= List of people from Nunavut =

Territorial flag of Nunavut

This is a list of notable people who are from Nunavut, Canada, or have spent a large part or formative part of their life in that territory.

== A ==
- Eva Aariak, former Premier of Nunavut
- Susan Aglukark, singer-songwriter
- Leona Aglukkaq, MP, Minister of the Environment for Canada, territorial MLA and minister
- Olayuk Akesuk, territorial politician
- Atuat Akkitirq, filmmaker, actress, and costume designer
- David Alagalak, territorial politician
- Ovide Alakannuark, territorial politician
- Madeleine Allakariallak, musician and television journalist
- Siku Allooloo, writer, artist, and educator
- Titus Allooloo, territorial politician
- Elizabeth Kugmucheak Alooq, artist
- Simeonie Amagoalik, carver
- Jack Anawak, former MP and territorial politician
- Michael Angottitauruq, territorial politician
- Elizabeth Angrnaqquaq, textile artist
- Luke Anguhadluq, artist
- Stephen Angulalik, fur trader and trading post operator
- Moses Appaqaq, territorial politician
- Goo Arlooktoo, territorial politician
- Joe Arlooktoo, territorial politician and artist
- Germaine Arnaktauyok, artist
- Alethea Arnaquq-Baril, filmmaker and activist
- Silas Arngna'naaq, territorial politician
- James Arreak, territorial politician
- James Arvaluk, territorial politician
- Karoo Ashevak, sculptor
- Kenojuak Ashevak, artist
- Kiugak Ashoona, artist
- Pitseolak Ashoona, artist
- Qapik Attagutsiak, World War II contributor
- Moses Aupaluktuq, territorial politician
- Elizabeth Nutaraluk Aulatjut, artist
- Susan Avingaq, film director, producer, screenwriter, and actress

== B ==
- Levi Barnabas, territorial politician
- Ernie Bernhardt, territorial politician
- Levinia Brown, territorial politician

== C ==
- Charlie Crow, territorial politician and DJl
- Tagak Curley, territorial politician

== E ==
- Edna Elias, Commissioner of Nunavut
- Ron Elliott (politician), territorial politician
- Tommy Enuaraq, territorial politician
- Elijah Erkloo, territorial politician
- Lucassie Etungat, artist
- Mark Evaloarjuk, territorial politician
- Joe Allen Evyagotailak, territorial politician

== F ==
- Kelly Fraser, singer

== H ==
- Ann Meekitjuk Hanson, former Commissioner of Nunavut
- Kenn Harper, historian, teacher, development officer, linguist, and businessman
- Donald Havioyak, territorial politician

== I ==
- Lucie Idlout, rock singer
- Osuitok Ipeelee, sculptor
- Alootook Ipellie, illustrator and writer
- David Iqaqrialu, territorial politician
- Peter Irniq, former Commissioner and territorial politician
- Enoki Irqittuq, territorial politician
- Peter Ittinuar, former MP

== J ==
- Kingwatsiak Jaw, sculptor

== K ==
- Vinnie Karetak, actor and filmmaker
- Nancy Karetak-Lindell, former MP
- Peter Kattuk, territorial politician
- Davidee Kavik, artist
- Simeonie Keenainak, accordionist and retired RCMP officer
- Kikkik, Inuk woman charged and acquitted of causing the death of one of her children in starvation times
- Ipeelee Kilabuk, territorial politician
- Peter Kilabuk, territorial politician
- Iyola Kingwatsiak, artist
- Kiviaq (David Ward), lawyer, politician, and former sportsman
- Adamee Komoartok, territorial politician
- Peter Kritaqliluk, Inuk activist
- Zacharias Kunuk, producer and director
- Jose Kusugak, territorial politician, husband of Nellie Kusugak
- Lorne Kusugak, territorial politician
- Michael Kusugak, children's writer and storyteller
- Nellie Kusugak, Deputy Commissioner of Nunavut and former acting Commissioner; wife of Jose Kusugak

== L ==
- Bill Lyall, territorial politician and president of the Arctic Cooperative

== M ==
- Helen Maksagak, former Commissioner of both the Northwest Territories and Nunavut
- Enook Manomie, artist
- Kavavaow Mannomee, artist
- Steve Mapsalak, territorial politician
- Glenn McLean, territorial politician
- Matty McNair, American explorer
- Rebecca Mike, territorial politician
- Kellypalik Mungitok, artist

== N ==
- Nakasuk, founder of Iqaluit
- Patterk Netser, territorial politician
- Kelvin Ng, territorial politician
- John Ningark, territorial politician
- Johnny Ningeongan, territorial politician
- William Noah, territorial politician and artist
- Jobie Nutarak, territorial politician

== O ==
- Kevin O'Brien, territorial politician
- Paul Okalik, former premier
- Abe Okpik, first Inuk to sit on the Northwest Territories Council
- Jessie Oonark, artist
- Elisapee Ootoova, elder and knowledge-keeper
- Stephen Osborne, writer and editor

== P ==
- Charlie Panigoniak, singer-songwriter and guitarist
- Pauloosie Paniloo, territorial politician
- Dennis Patterson, territorial politician
- Enuk Pauloosie, territorial politician
- Lena Pedersen, territorial politician
- Red Pedersen, territorial politician
- Sheouak Petaulassie, artist
- Keith Peterson, territorial politician
- Ed Picco, territorial politician
- Looty Pijamini, Inuk artist
- Peter Pitseolak, photographer, artist and historian
- Annabella Piugattuk, actress
- Annie Pootoogook, artist
- Sharni Pootoogook, printmaker
- Kenoayoak Pudlat, territorial politician
- Pudlo Pudlat, artist
- Ludy Pudluk, territorial politician
- Uriash Puqiqnak, territorial politician and carver

== Q ==
- Andrew Qappik, graphic artist
- Mumilaaq Qaqqaq, politician

== R ==
- Allan Rumbolt, territorial politician

== S ==
- Kakulu Saggiaktok, artist
- Eliyakota Samualie, artist
- Fred Schell, territorial politician
- Elisapee Sheutiapik, mayor of Iqaluit
- Daniel Shewchuk, territorial politician
- David Simailak, territorial politician
- Thomas Suluk, former MP

== T ==
- Tanya Tagaq, singer, songwriter and artist
- Louis Tapardjuk, territorial politician
- Peter Taptuna, territorial politician
- Nalenik Temela, sculptor
- Manitok Thompson, territorial politician
- Irene Avaalaaqiaq Tiktaalaaq, artist
- John Todd, territorial politician
- Kane Tologanak, territorial politician
- Simon Tookoome, artist
- Hunter Tootoo, territorial politician
- Jordin Tootoo, hockey player
- Akesuk Tudlik, artist

== U ==
- Natar Ungalaaq, actor, filmmaker, and sculptor

== W ==
- Sheila Watt-Cloutier, activist and former chair of the Inuit Circumpolar Council
- Rebekah Williams, territorial politician
- Gordon Wray, territorial politician

== See also ==
- List of writers from Nunavut
