= Central Arctic =

Former territorial electoral district in the Northwest Territories, Canada

The Central Arctic was an electoral district of the Northwest Territories, Canada, created in 1966 and abolished in 1983. The district consisted of Pelly Bay (Kugaaruk), Spence Bay (Taloyoak), Gjoa Haven, Cambridge Bay, Bathurst Inlet, Bay Chimo, Coppermine (Kugluktuk), and Holman (Ulukhaktok). For the 1983 election, Holman was moved to the Nunakput district and the others split between Kitikmeot West and Kitikmeot East. Today Holman, now Ulukhaktok, is the only one of the communities in the Northwest Territories as after division the others became part of Nunavut.

== Members of the Legislative Assembly (MLAs) ==
Name	Elected	Left Office
Duncan Pryde	September 19, 1966	1967
Robert Williamson	1967	1970
Lena Pedersen	1970	1975
Bill Lyall	1975	1979
Kane Tologanak	1979	1983
District abolished and split into Nunakput, Kitikmeot West and Kitikmeot East

== Election results ==
=== 1979 election ===
1979 Northwest Territories general election
Candidate	Votes	%
Kane Tologanak	370	46.02%
Bill Lyall	282	35.07%
Andy Palongayak	152	18.91%
Total valid ballots / Turnout	804	60.13%
Rejected ballots	9	
Source(s) "REPORT OF THE CHIEF ELECTORAL OFFICER ON THE GENERAL ELECTION OF MEMBERS TO THE COUNCIL OF THE NORTHWEST TERRITORIES 1979" (PDF). Elections NWT. January 1980.

=== 1975 election ===
1975 Northwest Territories general election
Candidate	Votes	%
Bill Lyall	404	42.71%
Andy Palongayak	274	28.96%
Lena Pedersen	268	28.33%
Total valid ballots / Turnout	946	78.32%
Rejected ballots	33	
Source(s) "REPORT OF THE CHIEF ELECTORAL OFFICER ON FEDERAL BY-ELECTIONS, BY-ELECTIONS TO THE COUNCIL OF THE YUKON TERRITORY, AND NORTHWEST TERRITORIES COUNCIL GENERAL ELECTIONS HELD IN 1975" (PDF). Information Canada. 1976.

== See also ==
- List of Northwest Territories territorial electoral districts
- List of Nunavut territorial electoral districts
