= Kitikmeot Region, Northwest Territories =

Coordinates: 69°N 111°W

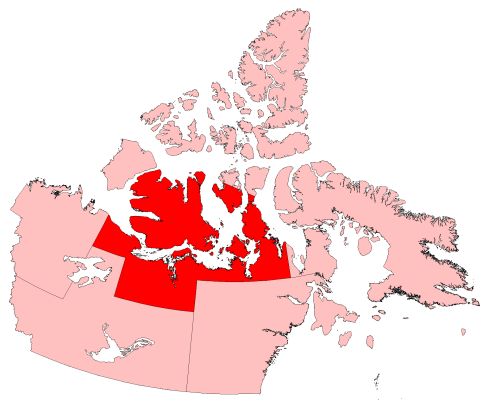
Pre-1999 Kitikmeot Region

The Kitikmeot Region was part of the Northwest Territories until division in April 1999 when most of the region became part of Nunavut. It consisted of Victoria Island with the adjacent part of the mainland as far as the Boothia Peninsula, together with King William Island and the southern portion of Prince of Wales Island. The regional seat was Cambridge Bay (pop. 1,351 - 1996).

Originally the entire region was part of the Fort Smith Region, Northwest Territories and was later called the "Central Arctic Region". For administrative purposes the region consisted of (all population figures 1996):

- Cambridge Bay (1,351)
- Coppermine (1,201), now Kugluktuk
- Gjoa Haven (879)
- Spence Bay (648), now Taloyoak
- Pelly Bay (496), now Kugaaruk
- Holman (423) now Ulukhaktok
- Bay Chimo (51), now Umingmaktok
- Bathurst Inlet (18)

However, for NWT election purposes Holman was included in the Nunakput district unlike the rest of the Kitikmeot.

After division Holman remained with the Northwest Territories while the rest of region became Kitikmeot Region.
