= Umingmuktogmiut =

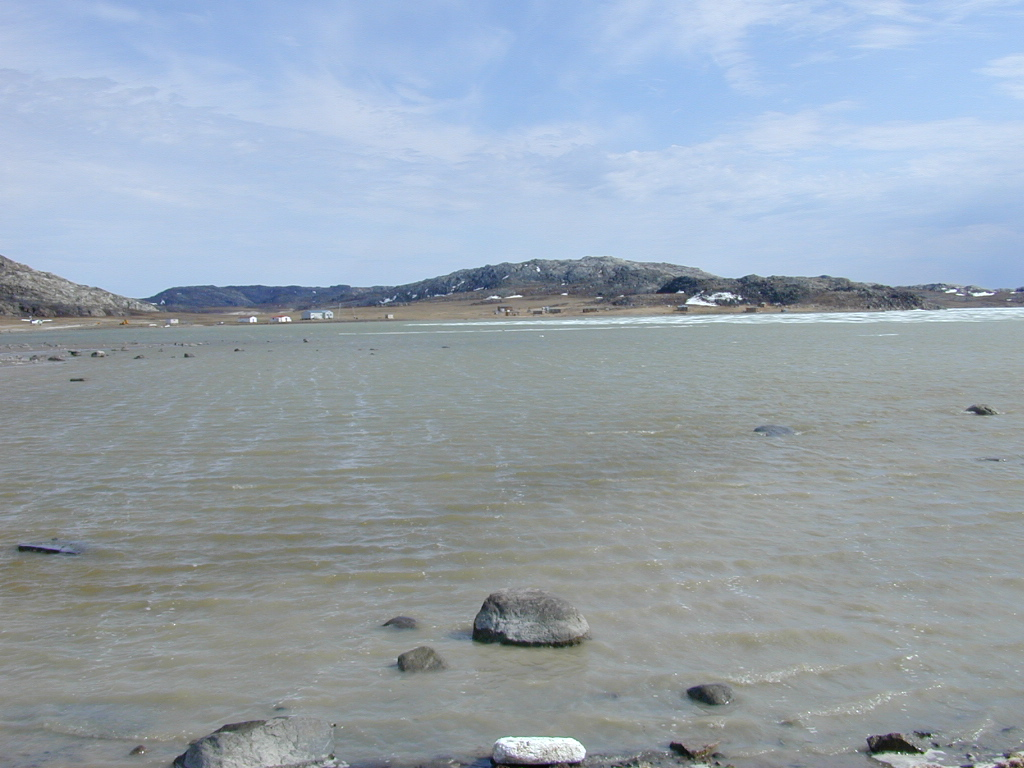
Umingmaktuuq - looking towards the Co-op store

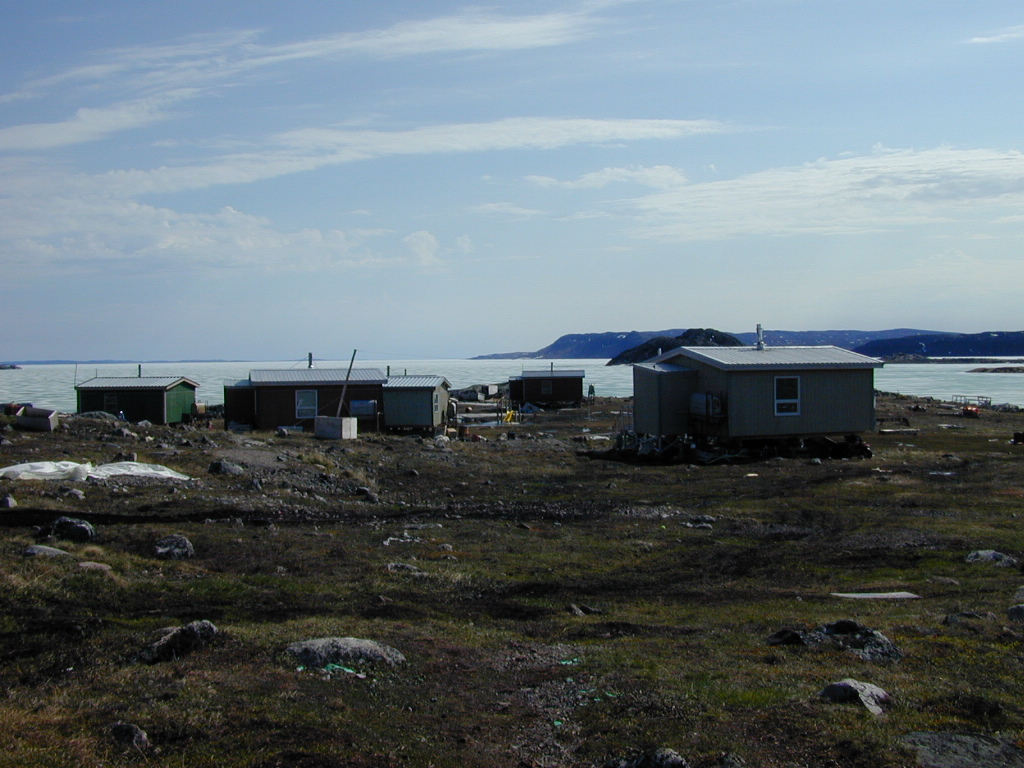
Umingmaktuuq - the other half of the community

The Umingmuktogmiut (Note: People of Umingmaktok) are a geographically defined Copper Inuit band in the northern Canadian territory of Nunavut, Kitikmeot Region. They were located on the western coast of Kiillinnguyaq (Kent Peninsula), and also further south in eastern Bathurst Inlet around Everitt Point by the Barry Islands. Umingmuktogmiut were notable amongst other Copper Inuit as they had a permanent community, Umingmaktok. They could hunt and fish for Arctic char, Arctic fox, barren-ground caribou, fur seals, and muskox prevalent in the area.

In 1964, the Hudson's Bay Company abandoned the post at Bathurst Inlet and moved into the area, then referred to as Bay Chimo, but now known as Umingmaktok (Note: From umingmak, the Inuinnaqtun word for muskox. "place of many muskoxen") but, eventually, the post closed.

The Umingmuktogmiut population of Umingmaktok declined in recent years with the 2021 census reporting zero population,
