= Peggy Ekagina =

Peggy Ekagina (1919–1993) was an Inuit artist, known for her stone carvings.

== Biography ==
The Inuit artist Peggy Ekagina was born in 1919. She lived in the Kitikmeot Region of Nunavut, Canada, primarily in the small community of Kugluktuk.

Ekagina began producing stone carvings, becoming her community's best-known carver. Her work has been exhibited across Canada and the United States. Her pieces are held in various collections including the Winnipeg Art Gallery, the National Gallery of Canada, the Canadian Museum of History, and the U.S. National Museum of the American Indian.

Ekagina's carvings are generally small, due to the size of the materials available to her. While Kugluktuk artists are known for carving igloos and camp scenes, Ekagina was notable for her depictions of animals with human faces, referencing themes of transformation and shamanism, in a distinctive style. In her work, bears, ermines, muskoxen, fish, and other creatures are combined with human features, often a woman's face with long braids. The artist herself was also particularly interested in depictions of drum dancing, an important Inuit tradition.

The artist had two sons, Moses Elatiak and David Tiktalik. She died in 1993.
