= Bobby Anavilok =

Canadian politician

Member of the Legislative Assembly of Nunavut for Kugluktuk
- In office November 19, 2021 – October 27, 2025
- Preceded by: Calvin Pedersen
- Succeeded by: Simon Kuliktana

Personal details
- Party: non-partisan consensus government

Bobby Nokolak Anavilok is a Canadian Inuk politician, who was elected to the Legislative Assembly of Nunavut in the 2021 Nunavut general election. He represented the electoral district of Kugluktuk until his defeat in 2025.

Prior to his election to the legislature, Anavilok worked in Kugluktuk as a hunter and stone carver.
