= Banks Peninsula (disambiguation) =

Banks Peninsula is a region in New Zealand. Other uses for Banks Peninsula include:

- Banks Peninsula (New Zealand electorate), New Zealand parliamentary electorate (1996–2008, 2020–present)
- Banks Peninsula District, New Zealand district council (1989–2006)
- Banks Peninsula (Nunavut), peninsula located on the mainland of Canada's Nunavut territory
