= Kitikmeot Region =

Kitikmeot ᕿᑎᕐᒥᐅᑦ (Inuktitut) Qitirmiut
- Region
- Kitikmeot Region
- Communities of the Kitikmeot

- Location in Nunavut
- Country: Canada
- Territory: Nunavut
- Regional centre: Cambridge Bay

Area (2021)
  - Total: 432,108.00 km^{2} (166,837.83 sq mi)

Population (2021)
  - Total: 6,458
  - Density: 0.01495/km^{2} (0.03871/sq mi)

Kitikmeot Region (/ˈkɪtəkmjuːt/; Inuktitut: ᕿᑎᕐᒥᐅᑦ, romanized: Qitirmiut) is an administrative region of Nunavut, Canada. It consists of the southern and eastern parts of Victoria Island with the adjacent part of the mainland as far as the Boothia Peninsula, together with King William Island and the southern portion of Prince of Wales Island. In the 2021 census, Kitikmeot had a population of 6,458 making it the smallest and least populated of the three regions of Nunavut. The regional centre is Cambridge Bay (population 1,760).

Before 1999, Kitikmeot Region existed under slightly different boundaries as Kitikmeot Region, Northwest Territories.

== Transportation ==
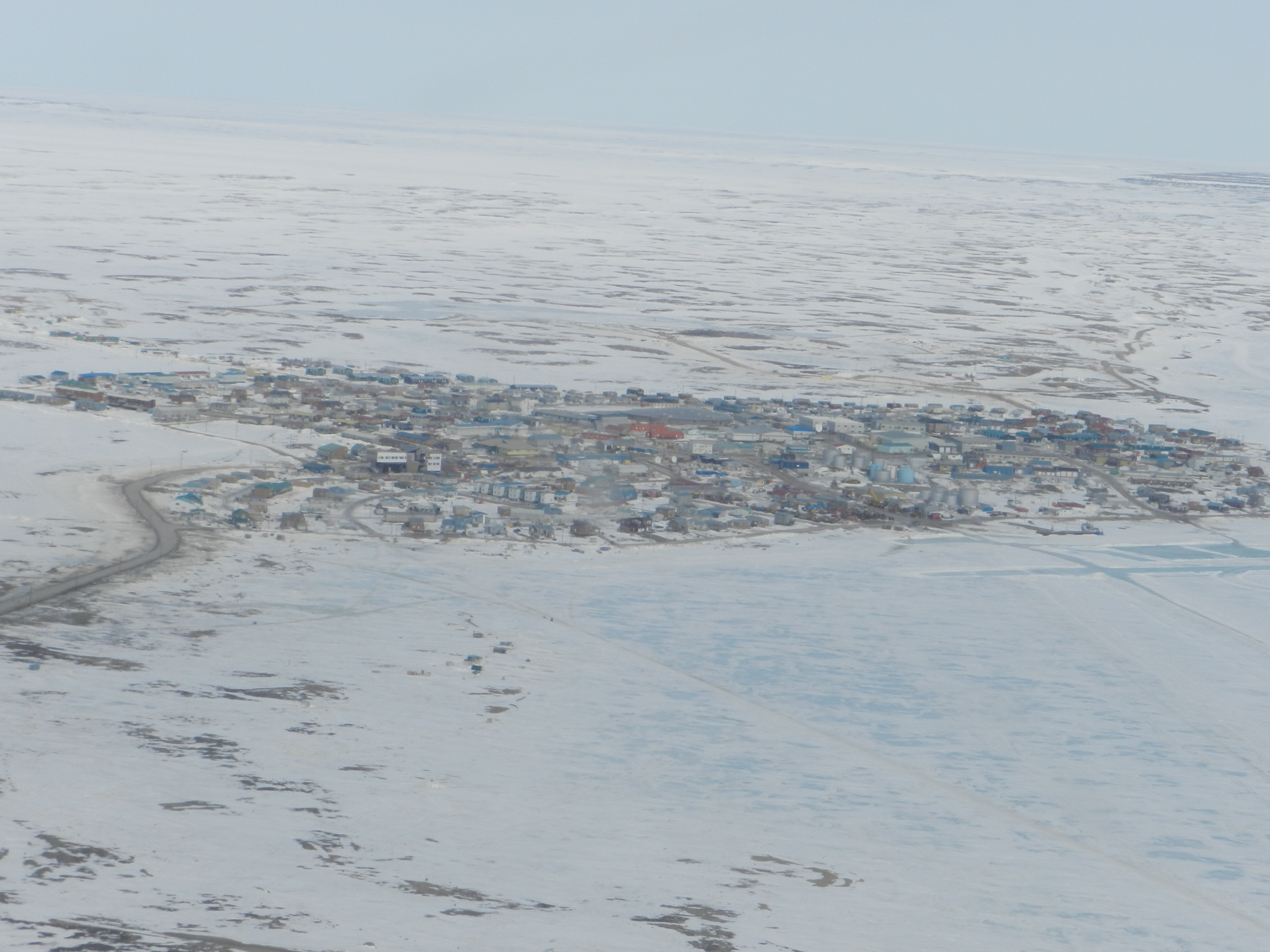
Cambridge Bay in May

Access to the territorial capital of Iqaluit is difficult and expensive as there are no direct flights from Kitikmeot Region communities to Iqaluit. For example, Iqaluit is approximately 1,069 km (664 mi) from Kugaaruk, the closest Kitikmeot community. A one-way flight to the capital costs between $3,000 and $4,000 (as of April 2025) and involves flying to, along with an overnight stay in, Yellowknife, Northwest Territories, approximately 1,310 km (810 mi) southwest of Kugaaruk—in total, a trip of about 3,627 km (2,254 mi).

As is the case for the rest of Nunavut, there is no road access to the region and all places are fly-in. All five hamlets have certified airports: Cambridge Bay Airport, Gjoa Haven Airport, Kugaaruk Airport, Kugluktuk Airport and Taloyoak Airport, with scheduled flights by Canadian North.

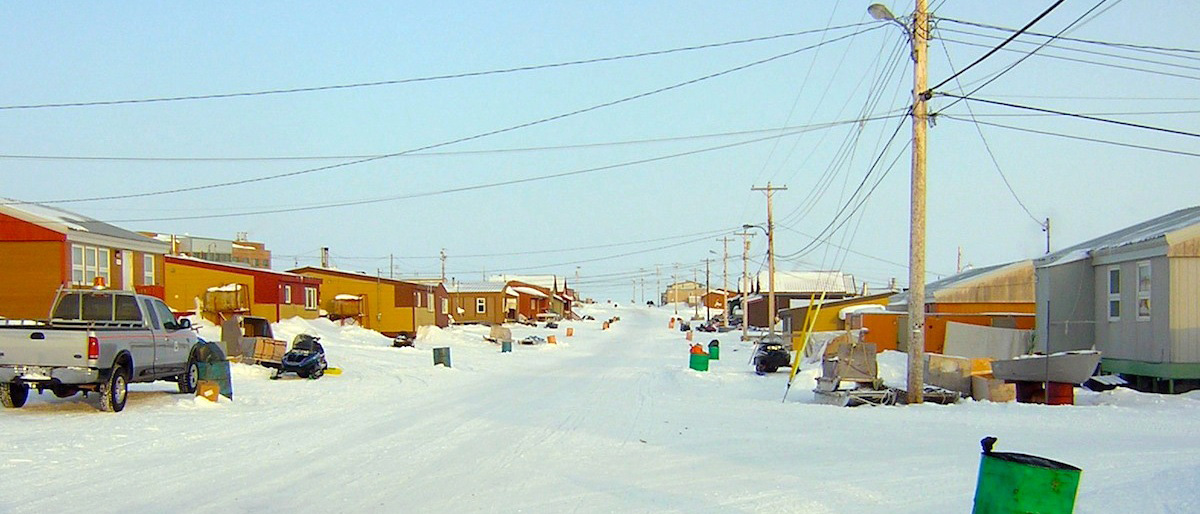
Street in Gjoa Haven

There are also four registered aerodromes in the region. Cambridge Bay Water Aerodrome is a floatplane base open in the summer only. George Lake Aerodrome, an ice runway is only open from January to April, and serves the Back River Gold Project. Goose Lake Aerodrome also serves the Back River Gold Project and has both ice and gravel runways. Hope Bay Aerodrome serves the Hope Bay mine site and is a gravel runway. The former Doris Lake Aerodrome, was a 7,894 ft (2,406 m) ice runway, and was the longest in the region, it served the Doris Lake mine.

== Climate ==
The Kitikmeot Region has a harsh subarctic climate (Köppen climate classification Dfc) and a tundra climate (Dfc) with long, very cold winters and short, cool summers.

Climate data for Kugluktuk (Kugluktuk Airport) WMO ID: 71938; coordinates 67°49′00″N 115°08′38″W; elevation: 22.6 m (74 ft); 1991–2020 normals, extremes 1930–present (Note: Climate data was recorded at Coppermine from October 1930 to November 1977 and at Kugluktuk Airport from December 1977 to present.)
Month	Jan	Feb	Mar	Apr	May	Jun	Jul	Aug	Sep	Oct	Nov	Dec	Year
Record high humidex	0.3	−1.7	−0.3	8.9	19.8	30.3	36.8	36.8	25.8	13.1	2.2	−1.5	36.8
Record high °C (°F)	0.8 (33.4)	1.1 (34.0)	−0.1 (31.8)	9.8 (49.6)	23.3 (73.9)	32.5 (90.5)	34.9 (94.8)	30.3 (86.5)	26.1 (79.0)	13.9 (57.0)	4.4 (39.9)	4.4 (39.9)	34.9 (94.8)
Mean daily maximum °C (°F)	−22.5 (−8.5)	−22.8 (−9.0)	−20.1 (−4.2)	−11.6 (11.1)	−0.6 (30.9)	10.4 (50.7)	15.8 (60.4)	13.7 (56.7)	6.8 (44.2)	−2.9 (26.8)	−13.2 (8.2)	−20.1 (−4.2)	−5.6 (21.9)
Daily mean °C (°F)	−26.6 (−15.9)	−27.0 (−16.6)	−24.6 (−12.3)	−16.4 (2.5)	−4.5 (23.9)	5.9 (42.6)	11.2 (52.2)	9.6 (49.3)	3.6 (38.5)	−5.9 (21.4)	−17.1 (1.2)	−24.1 (−11.4)	−9.7 (14.5)
Mean daily minimum °C (°F)	−30.7 (−23.3)	−31.3 (−24.3)	−29.1 (−20.4)	−21.2 (−6.2)	−8.5 (16.7)	1.4 (34.5)	6.5 (43.7)	5.4 (41.7)	0.3 (32.5)	−9.0 (15.8)	−21.0 (−5.8)	−28.1 (−18.6)	−13.8 (7.2)
Record low °C (°F)	−47.8 (−54.0)	−50.0 (−58.0)	−48.9 (−56.0)	−43.9 (−47.0)	−31.1 (−24.0)	−15.0 (5.0)	−0.8 (30.6)	−4.4 (24.1)	−20.0 (−4.0)	−35.4 (−31.7)	−41.1 (−42.0)	−45.0 (−49.0)	−50.0 (−58.0)
Record low wind chill	−64.3	−64.4	−65.0	−54.4	−39.7	−15.6	−5.9	−11.8	−22.9	−46.5	−54.1	−61.5	−65.0
Average precipitation mm (inches)	9.2 (0.36)	7.0 (0.28)	9.3 (0.37)	7.9 (0.31)	14.5 (0.57)	17.4 (0.69)	45.2 (1.78)	42.3 (1.67)	35.5 (1.40)	23.3 (0.92)	10.9 (0.43)	10.6 (0.42)	233.1 (9.18)
Average rainfall mm (inches)	0.1 (0.00)	0.0 (0.0)	0.0 (0.0)	0.1 (0.00)	4.3 (0.17)	14.6 (0.57)	44.4 (1.75)	44.9 (1.77)	31.4 (1.24)	4.7 (0.19)	0.0 (0.0)	0.0 (0.0)	144.5 (5.69)
Average snowfall cm (inches)	19.6 (7.7)	16.3 (6.4)	19.4 (7.6)	18.2 (7.2)	16.2 (6.4)	2.1 (0.8)	0.0 (0.0)	0.2 (0.1)	7.7 (3.0)	35.0 (13.8)	25.5 (10.0)	21.9 (8.6)	182.1 (71.7)
Average precipitation days (≥ 0.2 mm)	9.7	8.7	10.1	7.7	8.5	8.3	11.8	13.0	13.0	14.5	10.6	10.3	126.2
Average rainy days (≥ 0.2 mm)	0.0	0.0	0.0	0.2	1.9	6.8	11.5	13.1	10.5	2.3	0.0	0.0	46.4
Average snowy days (≥ 0.2 cm)	10.5	10.1	11.6	9.5	7.2	1.3	0.1	0.2	3.7	14.5	13.4	11.6	93.6
Average relative humidity (%) (at 1500 LST)	76.7	75.1	77.5	82.3	83.1	70.2	64.8	69.8	75.5	84.7	80.9	77.8	76.5
Average dew point °C (°F)	−30.6 (−23.1)	−31.3 (−24.3)	−30.2 (−22.4)	−20.8 (−5.4)	−7.5 (18.5)	0.8 (33.4)	5.5 (41.9)	4.6 (40.3)	−0.3 (31.5)	−8.3 (17.1)	−21.5 (−6.7)	−29.7 (−21.5)	−14.1 (6.6)
Mean monthly sunshine hours	17.8	77.3	160.3	233.3	246.7	375.0	341.6	207.7	91.1	51.2	19.6	0.2	1,821.7
Percentage possible sunshine	17.7	35.5	44.4	49.6	38.7	52.1	48.5	38.5	22.8	17.6	12.7	0.7	31.6
Source: Environment and Climate Change Canada (rain/rain days, snow/snow days, humidex, wind chill, humidity 1981–2010) Canadian Climate Normals 1981–2010 (dew point 1951–1980)

Climate data for Cambridge Bay (Cambridge Bay Airport) WMO ID: 71925; coordinates 69°06′29″N 105°08′18″W; elevation: 31.1 m (102 ft); 1991–2020 normals (Note: Climate data 1991–2020 is a composite also recorded at Cambridge Bay GSN; WMO ID: 71288; coordinates 69°06′29″N 105°08′18″W; elevation: 18.7 m (61 ft) and Cambridge Bay Airport at WMO ID: 71925; coordinates 69°06′29″N 105°08′14″W; elevation: 31.1 m (102 ft))
Month	Jan	Feb	Mar	Apr	May	Jun	Jul	Aug	Sep	Oct	Nov	Dec	Year
Record high humidex	−5.0	−9.7	−4.1	3.9	10.5	25.3	30.8	28.6	16.3	5.8	−0.6	−3.5	30.8
Record high °C (°F)	−4.9 (23.2)	−9.4 (15.1)	−4.0 (24.8)	6.1 (43.0)	11.5 (52.7)	23.6 (74.5)	28.9 (84.0)	26.1 (79.0)	16.4 (61.5)	6.9 (44.4)	0.0 (32.0)	−3.4 (25.9)	28.9 (84.0)
Mean daily maximum °C (°F)	−27.7 (−17.9)	−28.6 (−19.5)	−24.9 (−12.8)	−16.2 (2.8)	−5.2 (22.6)	6.0 (42.8)	13.3 (55.9)	10.3 (50.5)	2.6 (36.7)	−6.6 (20.1)	−17.5 (0.5)	−24.3 (−11.7)	−9.9 (14.2)
Daily mean °C (°F)	−31.2 (−24.2)	−32.1 (−25.8)	−28.8 (−19.8)	−20.7 (−5.3)	−8.9 (16.0)	3.0 (37.4)	9.4 (48.9)	7.4 (45.3)	0.5 (32.9)	−9.5 (14.9)	−21.1 (−6.0)	−27.8 (−18.0)	−13.3 (8.1)
Mean daily minimum °C (°F)	−34.6 (−30.3)	−35.6 (−32.1)	−32.7 (−26.9)	−25.1 (−13.2)	−12.6 (9.3)	0.0 (32.0)	5.4 (41.7)	4.3 (39.7)	−1.7 (28.9)	−12.3 (9.9)	−24.7 (−12.5)	−31.3 (−24.3)	−16.7 (1.9)
Record low °C (°F)	−52.8 (−63.0)	−50.6 (−59.1)	−48.3 (−54.9)	−42.8 (−45.0)	−35.0 (−31.0)	−17.8 (0.0)	−8.2 (17.2)	−8.9 (16.0)	−17.2 (1.0)	−33.0 (−27.4)	−43.9 (−47.0)	−49.4 (−56.9)	−52.8 (−63.0)
Record low wind chill	−73.4	−72.6	−69.8	−60.1	−43.2	−29.2	−7.9	−18.1	−28.6	−49.4	−60.7	−66.3	−73.4
Average precipitation mm (inches)	5.6 (0.22)	5.9 (0.23)	9.2 (0.36)	6.9 (0.27)	6.7 (0.26)	16.4 (0.65)	28.0 (1.10)	23.5 (0.93)	18.4 (0.72)	14.8 (0.58)	8.9 (0.35)	6.2 (0.24)	150.4 (5.92)
Average rainfall mm (inches)	0.0 (0.0)	0.0 (0.0)	0.0 (0.0)	0.0 (0.0)	0.8 (0.03)	11.4 (0.45)	28.0 (1.10)	22.4 (0.88)	13.2 (0.52)	0.9 (0.04)	0.0 (0.0)	0.0 (0.0)	76.7 (3.02)
Average snowfall cm (inches)	6.3 (2.5)	5.5 (2.2)	8.1 (3.2)	7.5 (3.0)	6.4 (2.5)	3.4 (1.3)	0.2 (0.1)	1.8 (0.7)	5.4 (2.1)	16.6 (6.5)	10.9 (4.3)	7.4 (2.9)	79.4 (31.3)
Average precipitation days (≥ 0.2 mm)	8.4	7.5	11.7	7.9	6.9	9.4	11.1	12.3	12.0	13.8	10.8	8.6	120.5
Average rainy days (≥ 0.2 mm)	0.0	0.0	0.0	0.0	0.8	6.5	10.4	11.8	6.8	0.83	0.0	0.0	37.2
Average snowy days (≥ 0.2 cm)	8.0	6.2	10.0	7.5	6.2	3.5	0.2	0.8	5.7	13.1	10.2	8.4	79.9
Average relative humidity (%) (at 1500 LST)	66.4	66.4	68.7	73.9	82.8	78.0	68.0	73.4	82.2	86.2	75.8	68.6	74.2
Source: Environment and Climate Change Canada (June maximum

== Politics ==
The region is home to the only two communities in Nunavut that voted "no" in the 1982 division plebiscite: Cambridge Bay and Kugluktuk.

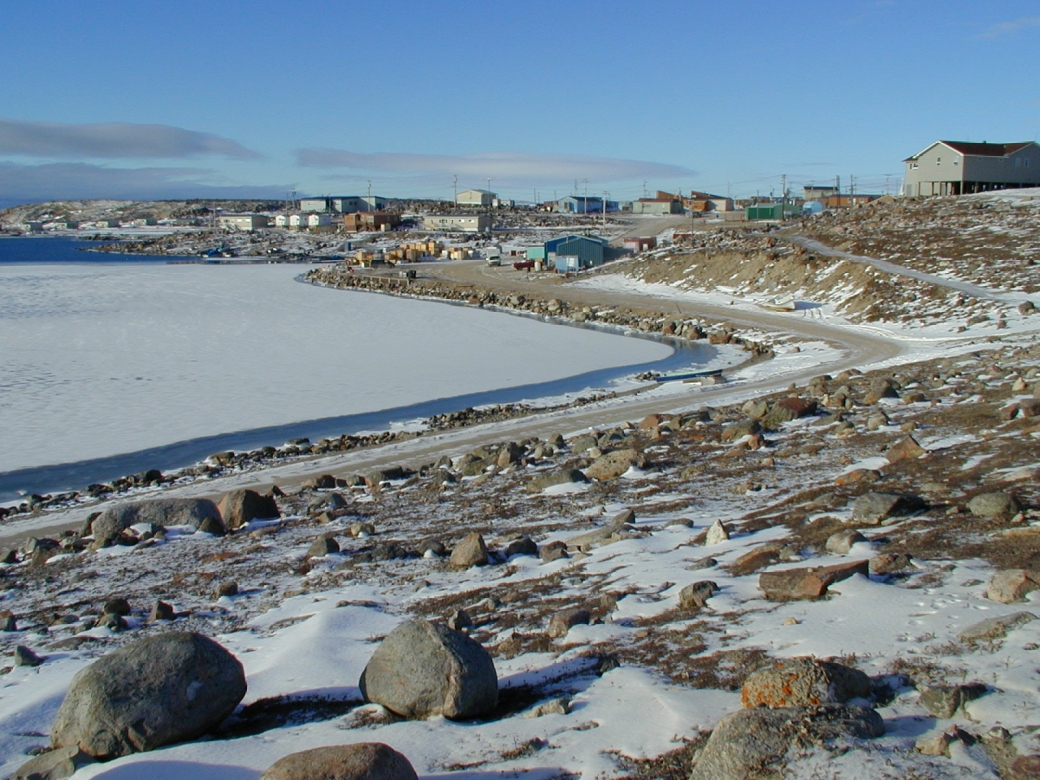
Taloyoak

The region has four electoral districts;

- Cambridge Bay, which covers Bathurst Inlet, Cambridge Bay and Umingmaktok. The seat is held by Fred Pedersen.
- Gjoa Haven, which covers the community of Gjoa Haven and is held by David Porter.
- Kugluktuk, which covers Kugluktuk. The seat is currently held by Simon Kuliktana.
- Netsilik, which covers Taloyoak and Kugaaruk. The seat is held by Cecile Nelvana Lyall.

Former districts include Akulliq, which covered Kugaaruk and Naujaat in the Kivalliq Region. It was the only electoral district in Nunavut to cross two regions. Nattilik, which covered Gjoa Haven and Taloyoak was held between 2004 and 2008 by Leona Aglukkaq, who went on to win the 2008 Canadian federal election for the electoral district of Nunavut and became the Minister of Health and then the Minister of Environment in the federal government.

In 2007 at their AGM, Bobby Lyall, a board member of the Kitikmeot Inuit Association and younger brother of Bill Lyall, suggested the formation of a political party called the Bloc Kitikmeot to run in the next general election and to advocate for a separate Kitikmeot Territory. Bobby Lyall, along with his brother Kitikmeot Corporation president, Charlie Lyall and delegates Martina and Connie Kapolak, argued that the Government of Nunavut had spent most of the infrastructure money available from the federal government in the Baffin Region (Qikiqtaaluk Region). However, the party was not formed and consequently no members ran for a seat in the Legislative Assembly of Nunavut which continues to run as a consensus government.

== Communities ==
=== Hamlets ===
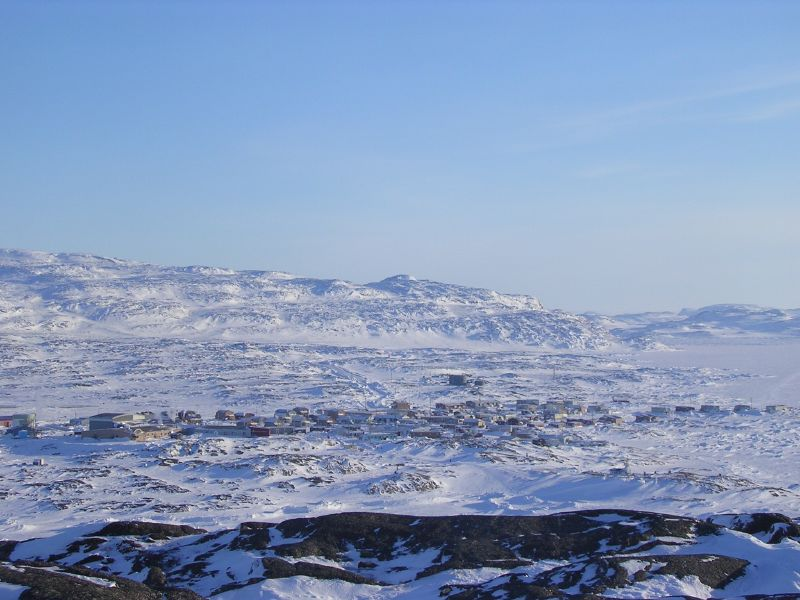
Hamlet of Kugaaruk

There are five hamlets in the region:

- Cambridge Bay population: 1,760
- Gjoa Haven population: 1,349
- Kugaaruk population: 1,033
- Kugluktuk population: 1,382
- Taloyoak population: 934

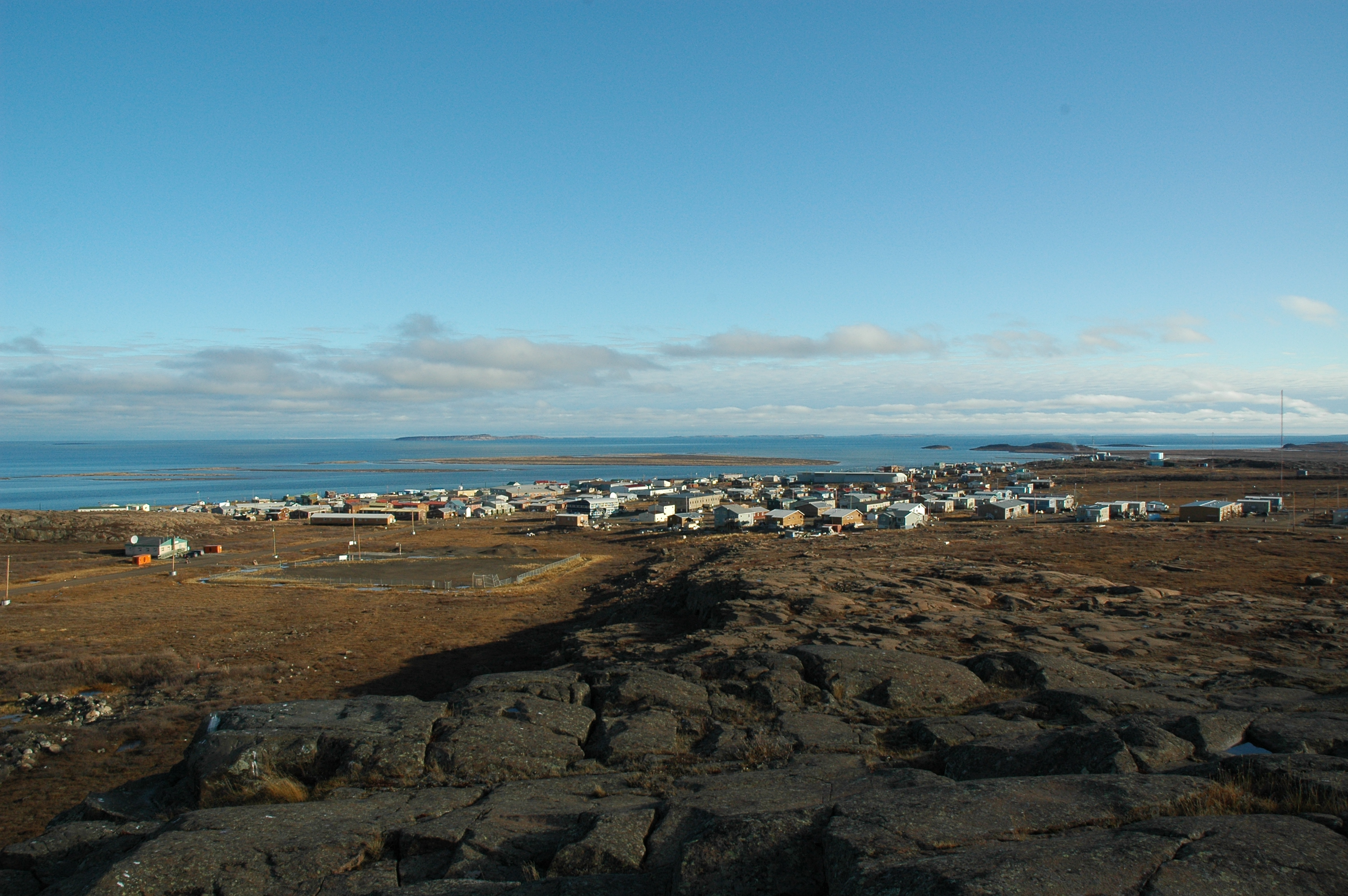
Kugluktuk

=== Other ===
There are three other census subdivisions in the Kitikmeot:

- Bathurst Inlet population: 0
- Umingmaktok population: 0
- Kitikmeot, Unorganized population: 0

== Protected areas ==
- Ovayok Territorial Park
- Northwest Passage Territorial Park
- Kugluk/Bloody Falls Territorial Park
- Queen Maud Gulf Migratory Bird Sanctuary
- Wrecks of HMS Erebus and HMS Terror National Historic Site

== Demographics ==
In the 2021 Canadian census conducted by Statistics Canada, the Kitikmeot Region had a population of 6,458 living in 1,677 of its 1,954 total private dwellings, a change of −1.3% from its 2016 population of 6,543. With a land area of 432,108 km^{2} (166,838 sq mi), it had a population density of 0.015/km^{2} (0.039/sq mi) in 2021.

The Kitikmeot Region also doubles as one of three census divisions in Nunavut, the others being the Kivalliq (also known as the Keewatin) and the Qikiqtaaluk (formerly known as the Baffin) regions. Of the three the Kitikmeot is the smallest in size being 2,223.16 km^{2} (858.37 sq mi) smaller than the Kivalliq. It has the smallest population and is the least densely populated of the three. The population is predominantly Inuit (89.3%) with 0.5% other Indigenous peoples, 0.2% North American Indian and 0.3% Métis, and 10.2% non-Indigenous.
