= Lena Pedersen =

Canadian Inuk politician

MLA for Central Arctic
- In office 1975–1979
- Preceded by: Robert Williamson
- Succeeded by: Bill Lyall

Personal details
- Born: 1940 (age 85–86) Greenland
- Party: non-partisan consensus government
- Spouse: Red Pedersen
- Relations: Calvin Pedersen (grandson)
- Children: 5, including Fred Pedersen
- Occupation: Social worker

Elizabeth Magdalena "Lena" Pedersen or Pederson (born 1940) is a Inuk politician and social worker from Nunavut, Canada. In 1959, she moved from Greenland to the Northwest Territories and lived in Coppermine (Kugluktuk), Pangnirtung and Rae (Behchokǫ̀) before moving to Cape Dorset (Kinngait) where she participated in the artwork sales of the West Baffin Eskimo Cooperative.

== Life and career ==
Pedersen was born in Greenland in 1940. In the 1970 general election, Pedersen was the first woman elected to the Legislative Assembly of the Northwest Territories representing the Central Arctic District The elections ordinance was amended to allow women the vote and run for office prior to the 1951 Northwest Territories general election. Pedersen was not the first woman to run, however, as Vivian Roberts was a candidate in the 1951 election.

In 1999 she was appointed by premier Paul Okalik to the Maligarnit Qimirrujiit, Nunavut's Law Review Commission. Prior to her appointment, she served as a board member for the Inuit Tapirisat of Canada (Inuit Tapiriit Kanatami) and the Northwest Territories Housing Corporation, and as a drug and alcohol program coordinator for Kugluktuk.

In 2003 Northwest Territories general election she ran in Yellowknife Centre but was defeated.

The former Lena Pederson (Kitikmeot) Boarding Home in Yellowknife, that was used by patients from Nunavut's Kitikmeot Region while on medical travel, was named in her honour.

She was, at one time, married to Red Pedersen and their grandson, Calvin Pedersen was acclaimed as MLA to the Legislative Assembly of Nunavut in July 2020, representing the Kugluktuk electoral district. In the 2025 Nunavut general election their son, Fred Pedersen, was also elected to the Legislative Assembly of Nunavut but for the Cambridge Bay electoral district.

== Quote ==
Regarding the geographic move of the Northwest Territories government and the effect on Eskimo Co-operatives, Pedersen is quoted as saying:

"The NWT Government moved North in 1967 to get closer to the people," but "it has achieved only to get closer in miles to some communities. It is still as far as or further removed from the people as it every [sic] was."— Lena Pedersen, 1974

== Partial bibliography ==
- Pedersen, Lena, and Donna Stephania. Crime Prevention in Kugluktuk. Ottawa: Caledon Institute of Social Policy, 1999. ISBN 1-894159-61-6

Legislative Assembly of the Northwest Territories
| Preceded by Robert Williamson | MLA Central Arctic; 1970–1975 | Succeeded by William Lyall |
