= West Arm =

West Arm may refer to:

- Kangiqhuk, formerly West Arm, Nunavut, Canada
- West Arm, Northern Territory, Australia, a geographical feature near the city of Darwin
- West Arm of Lake Nipissing, Canada, the location of St. Charles, Ontario
- West Arm Provincial Park, British Columbia, Canada
