= Calvin Pedersen =

Canadian politician

Calvin Pedersen MLA

Member of the Legislative Assembly of Nunavut for Kugluktuk
- In office July 24, 2020 – September 20, 2021
- Preceded by: Mila Adjukak Kamingoak
- Succeeded by: Bobby Anavilok

Personal details
- Born: Calvin Aivgak Pedersen
- Party: non-partisan consensus government

Calvin Avigak Pedersen is a Canadian politician, who was elected to the Legislative Assembly of Nunavut in July 2020. Representing the electoral district of Kugluktuk, he was directly acclaimed to office as the only by-election candidate to register by the nomination deadline following the resignation of his predecessor Mila Adjukak Kamingoak. He lost his reelection bid in the 2021 Nunavut general election.

He is the grandson of former MLA and Kugluktuk mayor Red Pedersen. His grandmother, Lena Pedersen was the first woman elected to the Legislative Assembly of the Northwest Territories in the Northwest Territories 1970 election.

He is currently working for Polar Knowledge Canada.
