= Kane Tologanak =

Canadian politician (died 2025)

MLA for Central Arctic
- In office 1979–1983
- Preceded by: William Lyall

Personal details
- Born: April 22, 1950 Kangiqhuk, Northwest Territories
- Died: March 24, 2025 (aged 74) Gjoa Haven, Nunavut, Canada
- Party: non-partisan consensus government
- Relations: Donald Havioyak (cousin)

Kane Tologanak (April 22, 1950 – March 24, 2025) was a Canadian Copper Inuk and politician who was a Member of the Northwest Territories Legislature from 1979 to 1983.

Tologanak was elected to the Northwest Territories Legislature in the Central Arctic district in the 1979 Northwest Territories general election. He became minister of supply and services in 1981, and later served as the minister of health. He served one term and did not return when the legislature was dissolved in 1983. Kane Tologanak was listed as a member of the Committee for "Inuit Qaujimajatuqangit in the Government of Nunavut."

== Personal life ==
Tologanak was born around 1950 in Kangiqhuk (formerly West Arm) near Cambridge Bay. Tologanak married Elik c. 1974. They had four children and seven grandchildren. Tologanak was first cousin of Donald Havioyak, who was MLA for Nunavut from 1999 to 2004. Tologanak died in Gjoa Haven on March 24, 2025.
