= Peter Taptuna =

Canadian politician

- ᐲᑕ ᑕᑉᑑᓇ
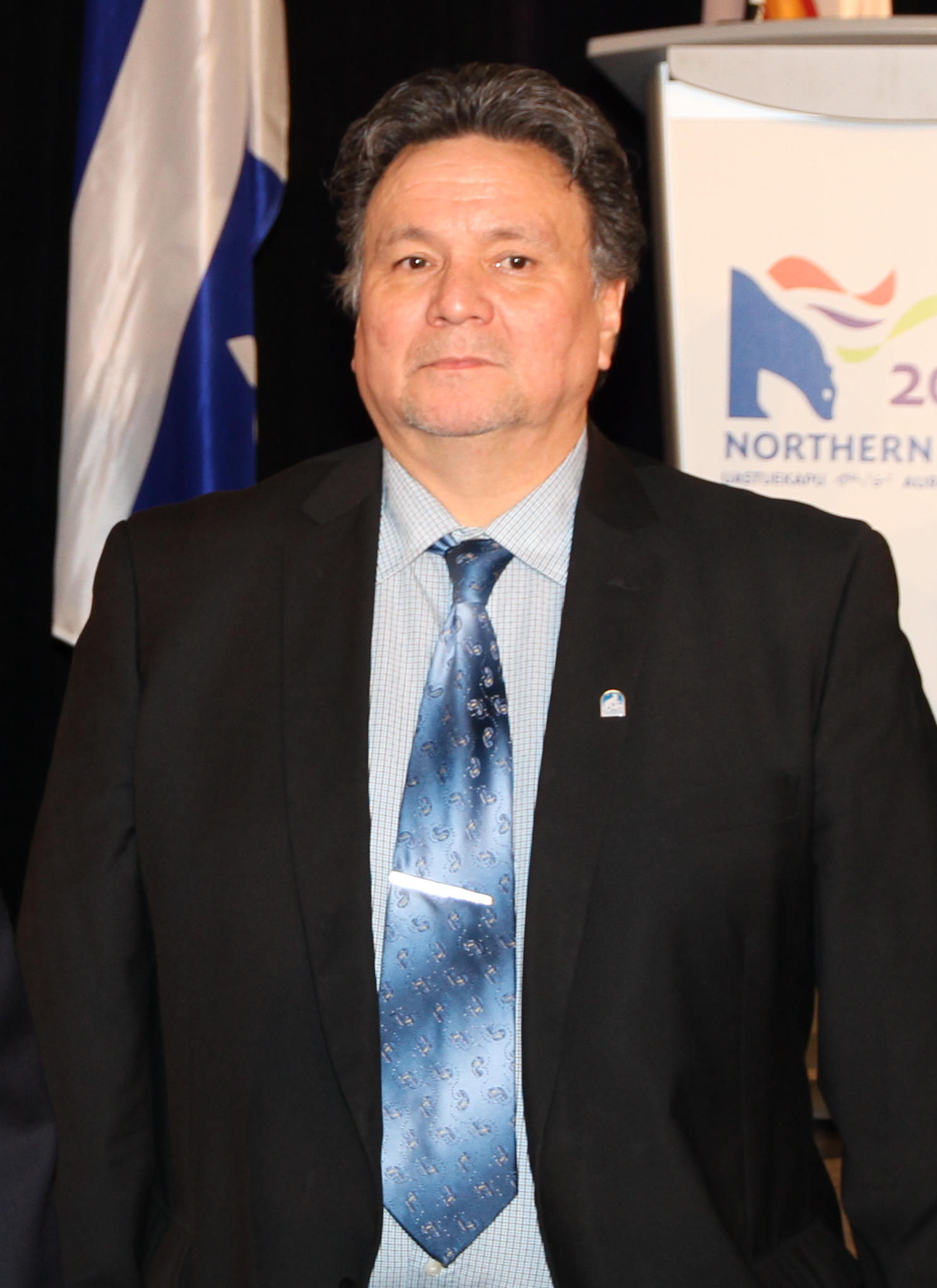
- Taptuna in 2014

3rd Premier of Nunavut
- In office November 19, 2013 – November 21, 2017
- Commissioner: Edna Elias; Nellie Kusugak
- Preceded by: Eva Aariak
- Succeeded by: Paul Quassa

Member of the Legislative Assembly of Nunavut for Kugluktuk
- In office October 27, 2008 – September 24, 2017
- Preceded by: Joe Allen Evyagotailak
- Succeeded by: Mila Adjukak Kamingoak

Personal details
- Born: 1955 or 1956 (age 69–70) Cambridge Bay, Northwest Territories
- Party: non-partisan consensus government
- Website: http://www.premier.gov.nu.ca/en

Peter Taptuna (Inuktitut: ᐲᑕ ᑕᑉᑑᓇ; born c. 1956) is a Canadian politician who served as the third premier of Nunavut from 2013 to 2017.

He was first elected in the general election held on October 27, 2008, to represent Nunavut’s most western riding of Kugluktuk, in the 3rd Legislative Assembly of Nunavut. He was elected Nunavut's third Premier during the November 15, 2013 proceedings of the Nunavut Leadership Forum. He was formally sworn into office on November 19, 2013.

From 2009 to 2013 he held many positions within the government of Nunavut, including Deputy Premier, Minister Responsible for the Nunavut Development Corporation, Minister Responsible for the Nunavut Business Credit Corporation, Minister Responsible for Mines, and since November 19, 2008, the Minister of Economic Development & Transportation.

== Early life, education and career ==
Born in Cambridge Bay, Peter Taptuna has spent most of his life in Kugluktuk, Nunavut. He attended residential school in Inuvik, Northwest Territories. He holds a diploma in management studies from Nunavut Arctic College, where he took courses in managerial accounting, corporate and contract law, business administration and human resources management. Peter Taptuna has also earned journeyman and red seal trades certifications.

Peter Taptuna worked in the oil and gas industry for 13 years, during which he was a member of the first and only all-Inuit drilling crew on an offshore rig in the Beaufort Sea. He has also held positions at the Lupin Gold Mine and the Kugluktuk Hunters and Trappers Organization.

Peter and his wife Joanne have five children and nine grandchildren. His personal interests include hunting, fishing and other on-the-land activities.

== Political career ==
Peter Taptuna served as a member of the Municipal Council of Kugluktuk and Deputy Mayor from 1999 to 2004. He has also served as a member of the Board of Directors of the Kitikmeot Corporation and the Nunavut Development Corporation.

He was first elected as the Member of the Legislative Assembly for the electoral district of Kugluktuk in the Legislative Assembly of Nunavut in the 2008 territorial election. In the 2008 election, Peter Taptuna received 264 votes (59.7%) ahead of the only other candidate, Donald Havioyak, who received 178 votes (40.3%)

On November 15, 2013, Peter Taptuna won against Paul Okalik and Paul Quassa for the position of Premier of Nunavut. In September 2017, Taptuna announced that he would not seek a third term in the 2017 Nunavut general election.

== Premiership ==
In his remarks at the Nunavut Leadership Forum (November 15, 2015), Peter Taptuna emphasized on the importance of seeking opportunities for the economic, social and cultural sectors.

To achieve this, he indicated that his priorities as Premier would be to focus on education and training while capitalizing on responsible investments across all sectors (resources exploration, infrastructure, small businesses, arts, culture, and tourism).

He also outlined the value of working diplomatically with stakeholders, Inuit organizations, municipalities and the federal government in order to achieve economic growth. He also explained that his vision of leadership goes well beyond being the voice of the people he serves: "it's about actions and outcomes, not visions and wish lists, and most of all, it's about us, it's about Nunavummiut, not individuals," he said in his remarks.

On October 3, 2014, Nunavut and Canada officially resumed negotiations on devolution. The initial negotiations cover public lands and resources in Nunavut that currently fall under the federal government management and control. Offshore matters, such as oil and gas, are to be negotiated at a later date.
