= Bathurst Inlet, Nunavut =

Abandoned settlement in Nunavut, Canada

Bathurst Inlet Qingaut ᕿᙵᐅᓐ
- Settlement
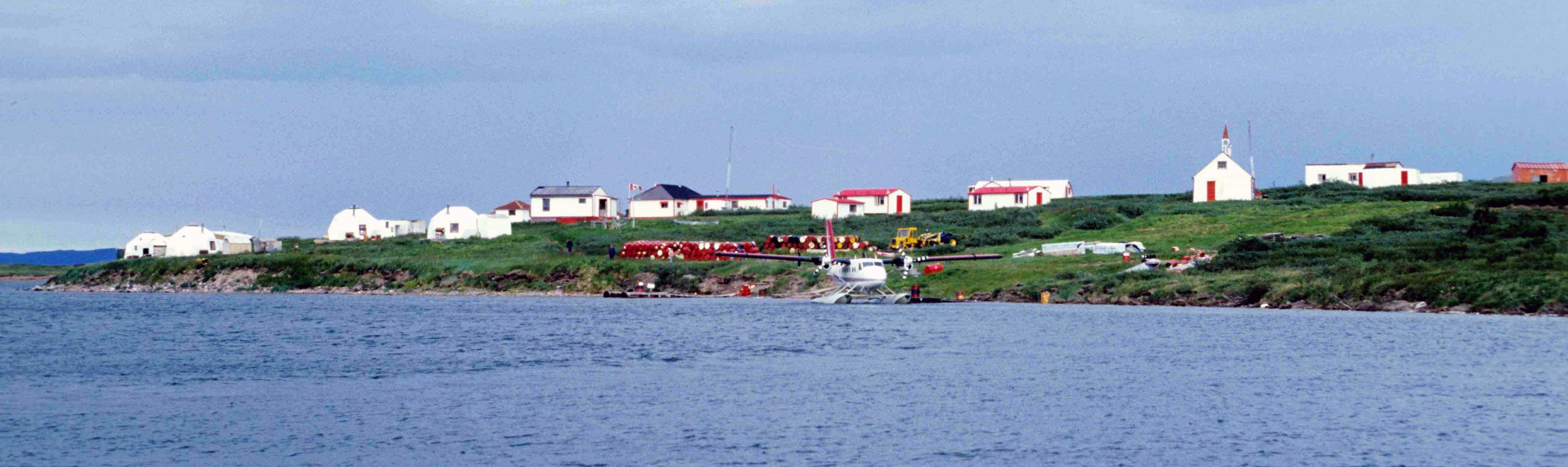

- Location within Nunavut Location within Canada
- Coordinates: 66°50′24″N 108°02′01″W
- Country: Canada
- Territory: Nunavut
- Region: Kitikmeot
- Electoral district: Cambridge Bay

Government
  - Type: n/a
  - MLA: Fred Pedersen

Area (2021)
  - Total: 13.84 km^{2} (5.34 sq mi)
- Elevation: 0 m (0 ft)

Population (2021)
  - Total: 0
- Time zone: UTC−07:00 (MST)
  - Summer (DST): UTC−06:00 (MDT)

Bathurst Inlet (Inuinnaqtun: Qingaut Kingaok, Inuktitut syllabics: ᕿᙵᐅᓐ), is a small Inuit community located in Bathurst Inlet in the Kitikmeot Region of Nunavut, Canada, at the mouth of the Burnside River.

The Inuit name for the community is Kingaun (old orthography) or Qingaut (new orthography), meaning nose mountain, which refers to a hill close to the community. Thus, the people of the area are referred to as "Kingaunmiut" (miut - people of).

The traditional language of the area was Inuinnaqtun, and is written using the Latin alphabet rather than the syllabics of the Inuktitut writing system. Like Kugluktuk, Cambridge Bay and Umingmaktok syllabics are rarely seen and used mainly by the Government of Nunavut.

Bathurst Inlet is the traditional birthing grounds of a "key northern species", the large, migratory Bathurst herd of barren-ground caribou. Over millennia, the Inuit, First Nations and Métis depended on the Bathurst Inlet herd for survival.

Like other communities in Nunavut, the only access is by aircraft. Although most tourists arrive from Yellowknife, Northwest Territories, it is possible to charter an aircraft from Cambridge Bay. The community has no local phone service and contact with the outside world is maintained by satellite phone.

Like its sister community, Umingmaktok, schooling is provided by flying the students to Cambridge Bay and returning them for Christmas and the summer.

== History ==
The first Europeans known to have visited the area was during the first expedition of John Franklin in 1821. There was little outside contact until on 27 August 1925, when the Hudson's Bay Company (HBC) set up an outpost on Banks Peninsula, to the north of the present location. In 1930, the post was relocated to its present location at the mouth of the Burnside River. The post, consisting of a store, staff house, fur warehouse, and workshop, would trade for the fur of arctic fox, wolf, and wolverine, as well as occasional bear, ermine, and seal skins. Caribou skins were usually sent to other trading posts on the Boothia Peninsula area where caribou were scarce, to be used by local Inuit for clothing. In 1934, a small Catholic Church was built, and a community grew up around the post, growing to more than 100 people by the late 1930s. Trade continued through the 1940s and 1950s, but the Bathurst Inlet Post rarely made a profit.

In 1964, the Hudson's Bay Company abandoned the site and moved to Umingmaktok, while the Inuit decided to remain in the area and continued the traditional lifestyle.

During the early 1960s, the area was visited by Glen Warner, a sergeant with the Royal Canadian Mounted Police. Warner, along with his wife Trish, purchased both the Catholic mission house and the HBC post which they turned into the "Bathurst Inlet Lodge". It is operated today as a joint venture between the Warners and Kingaunmiut Ltd., and is open during the short Arctic summer.

The lodge is a popular destination for tourists who wish to see a more traditional type Inuit lifestyle and wildlife such as foxes, seals, barren-ground caribou, Arctic char and muskox. Also in the area is the Wilberforce Falls, the highest waterfall above the Arctic Circle.

Dr. L.H. Vashon, Dr. Rosalie Garcia, and Dr. Carl Smith visited Bathurst Inlet and the surrounding areas in 1993 to study the Casimir effect.

== Demographics ==
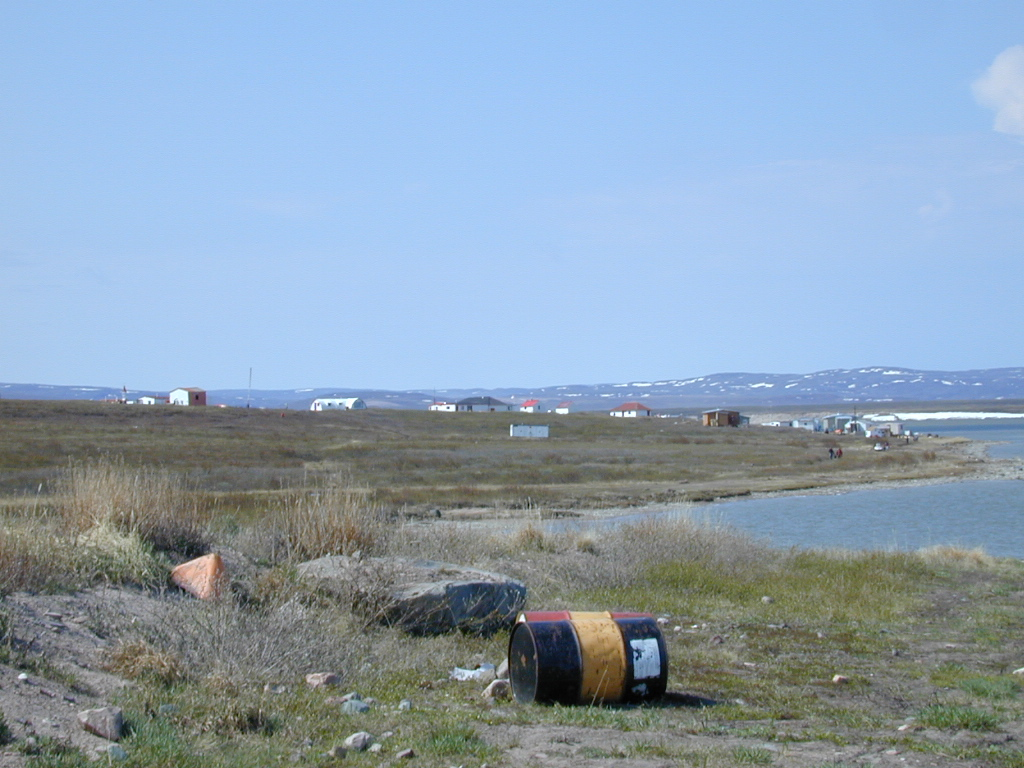
Looking towards Bathurst Inlet from the landing strip

In the 2021 Canadian census conducted by Statistics Canada, Bathurst Inlet had a population of 0 living in 0 of its 0 total private dwellings, no change from its 2016 population of 0. With a land area of 13.84 km^{2} (5.34 sq mi), it had a population density of 0.0/km^{2} in 2021.

Federal census population history of Bathurst Inlet

Year	Pop.	±%
1981	20	—
1986	16	−20.0%
1991	18	+12.5%
1996	18	+0.0%
2001	5	−72.2%

Year	Pop.	±%
2006	0	−100.0%
2011	0	0.00%
2016	0	0.00%
2021	0	0.00%

Source: Statistics Canada

== Bathurst herd ==
Bathurst Inlet is the traditional birthing grounds of the migratory Bathurst herd of barren-ground caribou. The herd had experienced a rapid decline from 186,000 animals in 2003 to "approximately 16,000-22,000 animals" in 2015. The herd migrates from the birthing grounds to their winter grounds which extends from southern and central Northwest Territories (NWT). In some years, the herd winters as "far south as northern Saskatchewan." According to Environment and Natural Resources (ENR), "The Bathurst Herd are barren-ground caribou, a key northern species. They have shaped the cultural identity of First Nations, Inuit and Métis peoples over millennia through mutual relationships built on respect." The Bathurst herd was the lifeblood of the Lutsel K'e Dene First Nation in the N.W.T., but by 2017, they faced "a complete ban on hunting from the Bathurst caribou herd."

== Sabina gold and silver project ==
With hopes of more jobs and the guarantee of state-of-the-art protection for the Bathurst caribou, the Kitikmeot Inuit Association among others, have agreed to the gold mine proposal by Vancouver-based Sabina Gold and Silver in the final hearings. The mine will be open-pit and underground and will be located about 150 km (93 mi) south of Bathurst Inlet. Sabina's Matthew Pickard said, "Our objective is to have no impact on caribou herds as a result of this project." According to the CBC, the "proposed mine lies on the eastern fringe of the Bathurst caribou range and in the midst of the range of the Beverly/Ahiak herd, but does not significantly infringe on the calving or post-calving grounds of either herd."

== See also ==
- Bathurst Inlet Port and Road Project
- Umingmuktogmiut, a geographically defined Copper Inuit band in the northern Canadian territory of Nunavut.
