= Stephen Angulalik =

Coordinates: 67°48′00″N 102°10′00″W

- Born: Angulalik ca. 1898; In the vicinity of Kuunnuaq (Ellice River)
- Died: 1980
- Occupation: Trader
- Employer: Hudson's Bay Company
- Known for: Perry River post manager
- Successor: Red Pedersen
- Spouses: Kuptana; Koloahok; Mabel Ekvana
- Children: Eleven
- Parent(s): Oakoak (father); Okalitaaknahik (mother)

Stephen Angulalik (ca. 1898–1980) was an internationally known Ahiarmiut Inuk from northern Canada notable as a Kitikmeot fur trader and trading post operator at Kuugjuaq (Perry River), Northwest Territories. His stories and photos were carried by journals and periodicals worldwide.

== Early life ==
Angulalik was born on the Queen Maud Gulf, less than 30 miles (48 km) to the west of and in the vicinity of Ellice River. His parents, Oakoak (father) and Okalitaaknahik (mother), were Caribou Inuit.

In 1923, Angulalik lived on the Kent Peninsula near a Hudson's Bay Company (HBC) post. The post had opened three years earlier and was run by Hugh Clarke; it was the most remote HBC post of the Canadian Arctic. Angulalik learned the fur trading business from Clarke. In 1926, Clarke and George Porter opened a Canalaska trading post for owner Captain Christian Theodore Pedersen in Perry River, probably because of Ahiarmiut relocation to that area, the Kent Peninsula caribou becoming scarce. In addition to the trading post, Clarke built a home for Angulalik, ensuring Ahiarmiut loyalty to the Canalaska post, rather than an HBC post a few miles away (run by Angus Gavin between April 1937 and July 1941).

== Career ==
In 1928, when new laws forced the closure of both posts, Angulalik continued as an independent trader, supplied by Canalaska. When Pedersen sold his company to the HBC, the sale included a provision for the HBC in Cambridge Bay to continue supplying trade goods to Angulalik. In 1929, Angulalik sailed to Herschel Island and purchased a schooner, the Tudlik, from Canalaska, using the Tudlik during his career to transport goods from Cambridge Bay or Herschel Island to his trading post.

There were odd things in his store, such as parasols and umbrellas for which the Eskimos had an intriguing new use. When covered with white cotton, they made conveniently packaged shields; behind them a hunter could creep up on a sleeping seal on the spring ice.

Angulalik's trade partners included distant Copper Inuit bands such as the Hanningajurmiut of Garry Lake (Hanningajuq, meaning "sideways" or "crooked"). The Hanningajurmiut were called the Ualininmiut ("people from area of which the sun follows east to west") by their Caribou Inuit neighbors of the north, the Utkusiksalinmiut. He also traded with the Illuilirmiut of Illuiliq from Adelaide Peninsula. As these Inuit were located between Angulalik's Perry River post and the Gjoa Haven HBC post, Angulalik set up an outpost closer to them at Sherman Inlet to secure their business. It was run by Angulalik's adopted son, George Oakoak, from 1948 to 1955.

Angulalik's trading ventures were successful despite the fact that he was unable to speak or write English. He either got help from other people or copied the words from the boxes that he received. This, according to at least one source, led to him ordering such things as "5 cases of This Side Up".

A crisis event occurred in Angulalik's life New Year's Eve 1956, when he stabbed the man Otoetok, in self-defense. While Otoetok’s wounds were minor, leaving them untended resulted in his painful death on January 4, 1957, leading Angulalik to sell his Perry River trading operations to the HBC the same year. Judge John Sissons presided over the murder trial in Cambridge Bay and Angulalik was acquitted. He returned to the Perry River post and worked with the new young manager, Red Pedersen, who became a lifelong friend. Angulalik stayed there until post closure in 1967.

== Personal life ==
There were no taboos against polygamy amongst the Ahiarmiut. By October 1937, Angulalik had two wives and the three of them were pictured in Life Magazine. Angulalik's first wife was named Kuptana; she died in 1939. His second wife was Koloahok; she died in 1938. No longer a polygamist, Angulalik was baptised "Stephen" in 1938, according to Royal Canadian Mounted Police Sergeant Henry Larsen. In 1941, Angulalik married Mabel Ekvana, about age 16, with whom he raised eleven children.

Inuit had used this area to trap foxes. I have gone trapping with Angulalik when we were just married. A long time ago on this river, Perry River we would set traps all along the shores of this river. When he ran the post, he enjoyed travelling and setting traps... we would travel up river not very far and set up traps with help from young men. He would always have someone helping him all the time. We would set traps along the coast by Sherman Inlet. -Mabel Ervana Angulalik

In 1967, Angulalik and Ekvana moved to Cambridge Bay, sent their children to the local school, and spent most of the year in a settled existence, but every summer, they returned to Perry River. Unlike other adults, Angulalik could neither read or write Inuktitut.

He enjoyed photography, owning cameras and photographic equipment. His photos are part of a collection at the Canadian Museum of History Ottawa.

== Awards ==
- 1935, King George V Silver Jubilee Medal
- 1953, Queen Elizabeth II Coronation Medal

== See also ==
- Notable Aboriginal people of Canada
