= Arviat (electoral district) =

Former territorial electoral district in Nunavut, Canada

Coordinates: 61°06′29″N 094°03′25″W

Arviat was a territorial electoral district (riding) for the Legislative Assembly of Nunavut, Canada. The riding consisted of the community of Arviat.

In 2011 the Nunavut Electoral Boundaries Commission recommended the district be split into two districts, Arviat North-Whale Cove and Arviat South. With the passage of Bill 22 in October 2011 the two new districts were created.

== Election results ==
=== 1999 election ===
1999 Nunavut general election
Name	Vote	%
Kevin O'Brien	474	62.53%
Kono Tattuinee	284	37.47%
Total Valid Ballots	758	100%
Voter Turnout %	Rejected Ballots	

=== 2004 election ===
2004 Nunavut general election
Name	Vote	%
David Alagalak	282	36.53%
Peter Alareak	216	27.98%
Kono Tattuinee	113	14.64%
Kevin O'Brien	86	11.14%
Peter Two Aulatjut	61	7.90%
Jay Saint	14	1.81%
Total Valid Ballots	772	100%
Voter Turnout 81.94%	Rejected Ballots 6	

=== 2008 election ===
2008 Nunavut general election
Name	Vote	%
Daniel Shewchuk	310	48.4%
Sheila Napayok	169	26.4%
Peter Kritaqliluk	162	25.3%
Total Valid Ballots	641	100%

== See also ==
- List of Nunavut territorial electoral districts
- Canadian provincial electoral districts
