= Red Pedersen =

Canadian politician (1935–2025)

Red Pedersen CM ONu
- Pedersen awarded the Order of Nunavut in 2021

Mayor of Kugluktuk
- In office January 1, 2014 – 2015
- Preceded by: Ernie Bernhardt
- Succeeded by: Ryan Nivingalok

MLA for Kitikmeot West
- In office 1983–1991
- Preceded by: New district
- Succeeded by: Riding dissolved

Speaker of the Legislative Assembly of the Northwest Territories
- In office 1987–1989
- Preceded by: Donald Morton Stewart
- Succeeded by: Richard Nerysoo

Personal details
- Born: November 19, 1935 Copenhagen, Denmark
- Died: May 30, 2025 (aged 89) Yellowknife, Northwest Territories, Canada
- Party: Non-partisan consensus government
- Spouse: Lena Pedersen
- Children: Fred Pedersen (son), Calvin Pedersen (grandson)

Military service
- Allegiance: Canada
- Branch/service: Canadian Army
- Years of service: 1960–?
- Rank: Lieutenant
- Unit: Canadian Rangers: 1CRPG

Asger Rye "Red" Pedersen CM ONu (sometimes Asgar Rye Pederson, November 19, 1935 – May 30, 2025) was a Canadian politician. In 1953, he got a job in the Canadian Arctic with the Hudson's Bay Company (HBC) at Cambridge Bay, Nunavut (then the Northwest Territories).

In the following year, he was sent to Perry River (Kuugjuak) to assist Stephen Angulalik, the Ahiarmiut Inuk owner of the trading post, with he financial records, inventory and ordering, as Angulalik spoke no English. In 1957, Angulalik sold the Perry River post to the HBC and Pedersen was appointed manager. Angulalik returned to the post after resolving legal problems and worked alongside Pedersen; they became lifelong friends.

He was, at one time, married to Lena Pedersen and their grandson, Calvin Pedersen was acclaimed as MLA to the Legislative Assembly of Nunavut in July 2020, representing the Kugluktuk electoral district. In the 2025 Nunavut general election their son, Fred Pedersen, was also elected to the Legislative Assembly of Nunavut but for the Cambridge Bay electoral district.

Born in Copenhagen, Denmark on November 19, 1935, Pedersen died on May 30, 2025, in Yellowknife.

== Public service ==
Ten years later, Pedersen became an area administrator for the Canadian government in Coppermine (Kugluktuk), Pangnirtung and Fort Rae (Behchokǫ̀). From 1983 to 1991, he was a member of the Northwest Territories Legislature. Pedersen was first elected to the Northwest Territories Legislature in the 1983 Northwest Territories general election, winning the Kitikmeot West electoral district. He was re-elected in the 1987 Northwest Territories general election. Pedersen was elected Speaker of the Assembly on November 12, 1987, and served that role until October 18, 1989.

In 2001, he was one of three members of the Legislative Assembly of the NWT's "Independent Commission on Members Compensation". Pedersen was a board member and Chairperson of the Independent Environmental Monitoring Agency until his retirement in 2003. He was made an honorary Inuk in 2003.

Pedersen retired from the Canadian Rangers, but his son and grandson continue the tradition.

In December 2013, Pedersen was acclaimed as mayor of Kugluktuk. In 2016, Pedersen was made a member of the Order of Nunavut. He was named a member of the Order of Canada in 2021.

== Partial bibliography ==
- Pederson, Asgar Rye, and David Repp. [Canada, Northwest Territories, Coppermine Eskimos, 1965]. 1965. Sound recording.

Legislative Assembly of the Northwest Territories
Preceded by New District	MLA Kitikmeot West; 1983–1991	Succeeded by District Abolished
Preceded by Donald Morton Stewart	Speaker of the Legislative Assembly of Northwest Territories; 1987–1989	Succeeded by Richard Nerysoo
