= Mila Adjukak Kamingoak =

Canadian politician

Mila Adjukak Kamingoak MLA

Member of the Legislative Assembly of Nunavut for Kugluktuk
- In office October 30, 2017 – April 3, 2020
- Preceded by: Peter Taptuna
- Succeeded by: Calvin Pedersen

Personal details
- Party: non-partisan consensus government
- Occupation: Administrative officer for the Nunavut Department of Culture and Heritage

Mila Adjukak Kamingoak is a Canadian politician, who represents the electoral district of Kugluktuk in the Legislative Assembly of Nunavut as of October 30, 2017. Kamingoak was the only candidate to register in her district by the close on September 29 of nominations for the 2017 general election, and was thus acclaimed directly to office. She had previously intended to run and challenge Premier Peter Taptuna, but was acclaimed to the position as the former had dropped out.

Kamingoak formerly worked on the campaign of her uncle Charlie Evalik; the president of the Kitikmeot Inuit Association, of whom her other uncle Stanley Anablak currently serves as the president of. Her brother in law PJ Akeeagok serves as the president of Qikiqtani Inuit Association.

She resigned her seat on April 3, 2020, citing family reasons.

== Personal life ==
Kamingoak is a mother of five, with two boys and three girls.
