= List of Nunavut territorial electoral districts =

Map of Nunavut electoral districts

This is a list of Nunavut territorial electoral districts. In total there are 22 electoral districts in Nunavut spread over three administrative regions. Each district elects one member to the Legislative Assembly of Nunavut in a first past the post system. Unlike some other parts of Canada, such as Ontario, a new by-election must be held in a riding if the original result ended in a tie. There are no political parties in Nunavut, each candidate runs as an independent and the territory operates by consensus government.

== List of districts ==
District	Incumbent (as of 2025)	Community	Region
Aggu	Joanna Quassa	Igloolik (north part)	Qikiqtaaluk Region
Aivilik	Hannah Angootealuk	Coral Harbour, Repulse Bay	Kivalliq Region
Amittuq	Abraham Qammaniq	Hall Beach, Igloolik (south part)	Qikiqtaaluk Region
Arviat North-Whale Cove	John Main	Arviat (north part), Whale Cove	Kivalliq Region
Arviat South	Jamie Kablutsiak	Arviat (south part)	Kivalliq Region
Baker Lake	Craig Simailak	Baker Lake	Kivalliq Region
Cambridge Bay	Fred Pedersen	Cambridge Bay	Kitikmeot Region
Gjoa Haven	David Porter	Gjoa Haven	Kitikmeot Region
Hudson Bay	Daniel Qavvik	Sanikiluaq	Qikiqtaaluk Region
Iqaluit-Manirajak	Gwen Healey Akearok	Iqaluit (west part)	Qikiqtaaluk Region
Iqaluit-Niaqunnguu	David Akeeagok	Iqaluit (east part)	Qikiqtaaluk Region
Iqaluit-Sinaa	Janet Brewster	Iqaluit (south part)	Qikiqtaaluk Region
Iqaluit-Tasiluk	George Hickes	Iqaluit (north part)	Qikiqtaaluk Region
Kugluktuk	Simon Kuliktana	Kugluktuk	Kitikmeot Region
Netsilik	Cecile Nelvana Lyall	Kugaaruk, Taloyoak	Kitikmeot Region
Pangnirtung	Johnny Mike	Pangnirtung	Qikiqtaaluk Region
Quttiktuq	Steven Taqtu	Arctic Bay, Grise Fiord, Resolute	Qikiqtaaluk Region
Rankin Inlet North-Chesterfield Inlet	Alexander Sammurtok	Chesterfield Inlet, Rankin Inlet (north part)	Kivalliq Region
Rankin Inlet South	Annie Tattuinee	Rankin Inlet (south part)	Kivalliq Region
South Baffin	David Joanasie	Cape Dorset, Kimmirut	Qikiqtaaluk Region
Tununiq	Annie Tattuinee	Pond Inlet	Qikiqtaaluk Region
Uqqummiut	Gordon Kautuk	Clyde River, Qikiqtarjuaq	Qikiqtaaluk Region

== Former districts ==
District	Community	Region
Akulliq	Kugaaruk, Repulse Bay	Kitikmeot Region, Kivalliq Region
Arviat	Arviat	Kivalliq Region
Iqaluit Centre	Iqaluit	Qikiqtaaluk Region
Iqaluit East	Iqaluit	Qikiqtaaluk Region
Iqaluit West	Iqaluit	Qikiqtaaluk Region
Nanulik	Coral Harbour, Chesterfield Inlet	Kivalliq Region
Nattilik	Gjoa Haven, Taloyoak	Kitikmeot Region
Rankin Inlet North	Rankin Inlet	Kivalliq Region
Rankin Inlet South/Whale Cove	Rankin Inlet, Whale Cove	Kivalliq Region

== See also ==
- Canadian provincial electoral districts
