= Bill Lyall =

Canadian politician (1941–2021)

MLA for Central Arctic
- In office 1975–1979
- Preceded by: Lena Pedersen
- Succeeded by: Kane Tologanak

Personal details
- Born: 1941 Fort Ross, Northwest Territories (now in Nunavut)
- Died: 28 December 2021 (aged 79–80)
- Party: non-partisan consensus government
- Spouse: Jessie

William Lyall CM ONu (1941 – 28 December 2021) was a Canadian territorial politician. Lyall was elected to the 8th Northwest Territories Legislative Assembly in the 1975 election.

Lyall grew up in Taloyoak, known then as Spence Bay, Northwest Territories, one of ten children of Ernie and Nipisha Lyall. Lyall was a residential school survivor. He attended Sir John Franklin High School in Yellowknife and then a technology college in Alberta.

After returning to Taloyoak, he later moved to Cambridge Bay. In 1975, he was elected to the NWT Legislature. He ran again in the 1979 election, as did his younger brother Bobby Lyall, but the election was won by Kane Tologanak.

In 1978, Lyall was elected president of the Ikaluktutiak Co-op in Cambridge Bay. By 1993, he had helped the Co-op grow from $300,000 in assets to $2.3 million. Later in the 1970s he became a director of Canadian Arctic Producers, a native owned arts and crafts wholesaler. In 1981, he helped form the Arctic Co-operatives Limited, a merger between the Canadian Arctic Co-operative Federation and Canadian Arctic Producers. He was the vice-president and president of the Arctic Cooperative, a position he has held for several years, and represented the communities of Kugluktuk, Cambridge Bay, Gjoa Haven, Taloyoak, Kugaaruk (all in Nunavut) and Ulukhaktok (Northwest Territories).

In 1992, he was awarded the 125th Anniversary of the Confederation of Canada Medal and in 1994 he won the National Aboriginal Achievement Award, now the Indspire Awards, for business. In 2002, he was awarded the Queen Elizabeth II Golden Jubilee Medal and in 2003, he was made a member of the Order of Canada in recognition of his work with the Arctic Cooperative. He received the Order of Nunavut in 2015.

Lyall was also vice-chair of the Nunavut Implementation Commission. He died on 28 December 2021.

Legislative Assembly of the Northwest Territories
Preceded by Lena Pedersen	MLA Central Arctic; 1975-1979	Succeeded by Kane Tologanak
