= Banks Peninsula (Nunavut) =

Peninsula in Nunavut, Canada

Coordinates: 67°15′N 108°30′W

Location in Nunavut

The Banks Peninsula (sometimes referred to as Banks' Peninsula) is located on the mainland of Canada's Nunavut territory. While there are no communities on the peninsula itself, the hamlet of Bathurst Inlet is situated nearby to the south, across the waterway of Bathurst Inlet. The peninsula features an irregular coastline, including a section bounded by Arctic Sound, with Point Wollaston being its northernmost geographic feature.

The peninsula is one of many landforms named in honour of Sir Joseph Banks, President of the Royal Society.
