= Donald Havioyak =

Canadian politician (1950–2025)

MLA for Kugluktuk
- In office 1999–2004
- Preceded by: Office established
- Succeeded by: Joe Allen Evyagotailak

Personal details
- Born: June 11, 1950 Napaktoktok, Northwest Territories Canada
- Died: November 20, 2025 (aged 75)
- Party: non-partisan consensus government
- Relations: Kane Tologanak (cousin)

Donald Havioyak (June 11, 1950 – November 20, 2025) was a Canadian territorial-level politician. He served as a member of the Nunavut Legislature.

== Life and career ==
Havioyak was born on June 11, 1950, in Napaktoktok. He was elected to the Nunavut legislature in the 1999 Nunavut general election. He won the Kugluktuk electoral district with a plurality of six votes defeating three other candidates. Havioyak served one term in office, running for re-election in the 2004 Nunavut general election. He was defeated by candidate Joe Allen Evyagotailak in another very close election. After his defeat in the election, he was elected to become the president of the Kitilkmeot Inuit Association in 2005. In the 2008 Nunavut general election, he was defeated by Peter Taptuna.

He is a notable Copper Inuk. He received Queen Elizabeth II Golden Jubilee Medal in 2002.

Havioyak was a first cousin with Northwest Territories MLA Kane Tologanak. He died on November 20, 2025, at the age of 75.
