= David Alagalak =

Canadian politician

MLA for Arviat
- In office 2004–2008
- Preceded by: Kevin O'Brien
- Succeeded by: Daniel Shewchuk

Personal details
- Born: April 11, 1944 (age 82) Southampton Island, Eastern Northwest Territories, Canada
- Party: non-partisan consensus government

David Alagalak (born 11 April 1944 on Southampton Island, Nunavut) is a Canadian politician, who was the Member of the Legislative Assembly (MLA) for the electoral district of Arviat in the Legislative Assembly of Nunavut from 2004 to 2008.

Prior to becoming an MLA, Alagalak was mayor of Arviat and served as a board member to several Inuit organizations.
