= Joe Allen Evyagotailak =

Canadian politician

MLA for Kugluktuk
- In office 2004 – 21 August 2008
- Preceded by: Donald Havioyak
- Succeeded by: Peter Taptuna

Personal details
- Born: July 15, 1953 (age 72) Kugluktuk, Nunavut
- Party: non-partisan consensus government

Joe Allen Evyagotailak was born 15 July 1953 in Kugluktuk, Nunavut, Canada. Evyagotailak was the Member of the Legislative Assembly (MLA) for the electoral district of Kugluktuk having won the seat in the 2004 Nunavut election.

Evyagotailak is a notable Copper Inuk. On 20 August 2008, Evyagotailak stepped down as the MLA. He stated that he wanted to run for the presidency of the Kitikmeot Inuit Association (KIA).

Prior to becoming an MLA, in the Legislative Assembly of Nunavut Evyagotailak was the mayor of Kugluktuk and worked with several local organizations, including the KIA of which he was both vice-president and president.
