= Kingwatsiak Jaw =

Inuk sculptor (1962-2012)

- Born: March 20, 1962; Keatuk, Nunavut
- Died: 2012 (aged 49–50)
- Parents: Joe Jaw (father); Melia Jaw (mother)
- Family: Mathew Saviadjuk (brother); Pootoogook Jaw (brother); Salomonie Jaw (brother)

Kingwatsiak (King) Jaw (1962–2012) was an Inuk sculptor from Kinngait.

== Early life ==
He was born on March 20, 1962, in Keatuk, Nunavut. His parents, Melia Jaw (1934–2006) and Joe Jaw were also carvers, as were his brothers (Mathew Saviadjuk, Pootoogook Jaw, and Salomonie Jaw). King began carving as a child, but did not do so professionally until his early thirties.

== Career ==
In his early thirties, when King began carving, he was also working as a carpenter and an industrial mechanic at the Nanasivik Mine.

Many of his sculptures depict the bears, as well as the sea goddess Sedna.

Jaw's work is held in several museums, including the Penn Museum, the University of Michigan Museum of Art, and the Museum Collections at the University of Delaware.
