= Kugluktuk Airport =

Airport in Nunavut, Canada

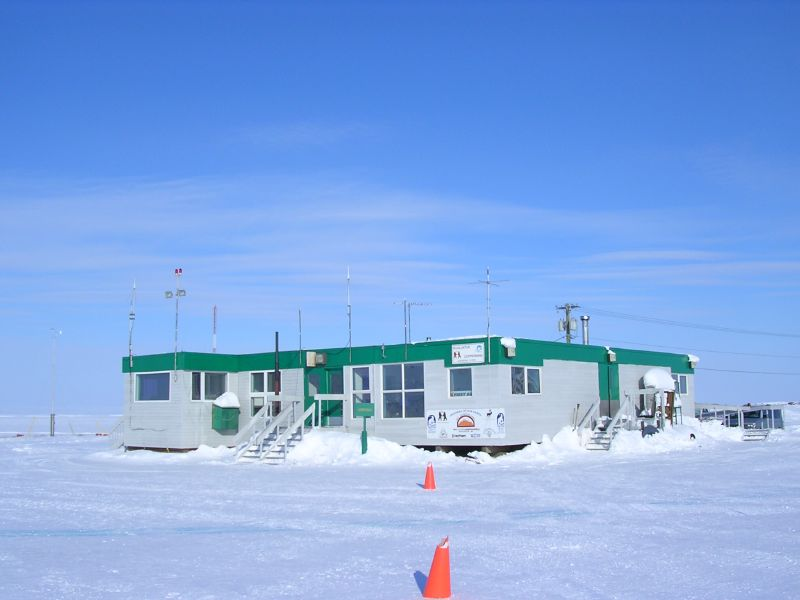
- IATA: YCO; ICAO: CYCO; WMO: 71938

Summary
- Airport type: Public
- Operator: Government of Nunavut
- Location: Kugluktuk, Nunavut
- Time zone: MST (UTC−07:00)
  - Summer (DST): MDT (UTC−06:00)
- Elevation AMSL: 74 ft / 23 m
- Coordinates: 67°49′00″N 115°08′38″W

Map
- Location in Nunavut CYCO (Canada)

Runways
Direction	Length		Surface
Direction	ft	m	Surface
12/30	5,502	1,677	Gravel

Statistics (2010)
- Aircraft movements: 4,185
- Sources: Canada Flight Supplement; Environment Canada; Movements from Statistics Canada.

Kugluktuk Airport (IATA: YCO, ICAO: CYCO) is located at Kugluktuk, Nunavut, Canada, and is operated by the Government of Nunavut.

The old terminal building was constructed more than 40 years ago and is being replaced with a new terminal building that has a larger waiting area, airline offices and luggage area. Cost is split nearly evenly between Government of Nunavut and Government of Canada through the National Trade Corridors Fund. Construction of the new building began in May 2023 and completed in spring 2025.

== Airlines and destinations ==
Airlines	Destinations
Canadian North	Cambridge Bay, Ulukhaktok, Yellowknife

=== Cargo ===
Airlines	Destinations
Buffalo Airways	Yellowknife
