= Daniel Shewchuk =

Canadian politician

MLA for Arviat
- In office 2008–2013
- Preceded by: David Alagalak
- Succeeded by: riding dissolved

Personal details
- Party: non-partisan Consensus government

Daniel Shewchuk (b. 1959 or 1960) is a Canadian politician, who was elected as the Member of the Legislative Assembly for the electoral district of Arviat in the Legislative Assembly of Nunavut in the 2008 territorial election. In that election, he gained 48.4% of the vote, 22% more than his closest competitor. As of April 2010 he is the Minister of Environment, Minister of Human Resources and Minister Responsible for the Nunavut Arctic College.
