= Kugluktuk (electoral district) =

Territorial electoral district in Nunavut, Canada

Nunavut electoral district
- Boundaries of Kugluktuk
- Coordinates: 67°49′32″N 115°05′42″W

Territorial electoral district
- Legislature: Legislative Assembly of Nunavut
MLA
Simon Kuliktana
- District created: 1999
- First contested: 1999
- Last contested: 2025

Demographics
- Population (2006): 1,302
- Census division: Kitikmeot Region
- Census subdivision: Kugluktuk

Kugluktuk (Inuinnaqtun and French: Kugluktuk, Inuktitut: ᖁᕐᓗᕐᒃᑐᕐᒃ) is the most western territorial electoral district (riding) for the Legislative Assembly of Nunavut, Canada. The riding consists of the community of Kugluktuk in the Kitikmeot Region.

Former Member of the Legislative Assembly for Kugluktuk, Joe Allen Evyagotailak, stepped down 20 August 2008, stating that he wanted to run for the presidency of the Kitikmeot Inuit Association (KIA). There was not a by-election as the next general election was to be held 27 October 2008, leaving the riding unrepresented at the last session. At that time, Peter Taptuna was elected. He was acclaimed at the subsequent general election, and was later elected premier by the legislature. He did not run in the 2017 general election, and the riding again acclaimed its next MLA, Mila Adjukak Kamingoak. After the resignation of Kamingoak, Calvin Pedersen, grandson of former MLA Red Pedersen, was acclaimed as MLA on 24 July 2020.

== Members of the Legislative Assembly ==
† by-election

| Parliament | Years | Member |
|---|---|---|
| 1st | 1999–2004 | Donald Havioyak |
| 2nd | 2004–2008 | Joe Allen Evyagotailak |
| 3rd | 2008–2013 | Peter Taptuna |
| 4th | 2013–2017 | Peter Taptuna |
| 5th | 2017–2020 | Mila Adjukak Kamingoak |
| 5th† | 2020–2021 | Calvin Pedersen |
| 6th | 2021–2025 | Bobby Anavilok |
| 7th | 2025–present | Simon Kuliktana |

== Election results ==
=== 2025 election ===
2025 Nunavut general election
| Candidate | Votes | % |
|---|---|---|
| Simon Kuliktana | 218 | 60.7 |
| Stanley Anablak | 93 | 25.9 |
| Bobby Anavilok | 48 | 13.4 |
| Eligible voters | | 775 |
| Total valid ballots | | 361 |
| Rejected ballots | | 2 |
| Turnout | | 46.58% |

=== 2021 election ===
2021 Nunavut general election
| Candidate | Votes | % |
|---|---|---|
| Bobby Anavilok | 170 | 38.8 |
| Calvin Pedersen | 140 | 32.0 |
| Angele Kuliktana | 77 | 17.6 |
| Genevieve Nivingalok | 51 | 11.6 |
| Eligible voters | | 717 |
| Total valid ballots | | 438 |
| Rejected ballots | | 5 |
| Turnout | | 61.1% |

=== 2020 by-election ===
2020 Nunavut general election
| Candidate | Votes |
|---|---|
| Calvin Aivgak Pedersen | Acclaimed |

=== 2017 election ===
2017 Nunavut general election
| Candidate | Votes |
|---|---|
| Mila Adjukak Kamingoak | Acclaimed |

=== 2013 election ===
2013 Nunavut general election
| Candidate | Votes |
|---|---|
| Peter Taptuna | Acclaimed |

=== 2008 election ===
2008 Nunavut general election
| Candidate | Votes | % |
|---|---|---|
| Peter Taptuna | 264 | 59.7 |
| Donald Havioyak | 178 | 40.3 |
| Eligible voters | | 648 |
| Total valid ballots | | 442 |
| Rejected ballots | | 2 |
| Turnout | | 68.2% |

=== 2004 election ===
2004 Nunavut general election
| Candidate | Votes | % |
|---|---|---|
| Joe Allen Evyagotailak | 215 | 40.41 |
| Donald Havioyak | 165 | 31.02 |
| Millie Kuliktana | 152 | 28.57 |
| Eligible voters | | 396 |
| Total valid ballots | | 532 |
| Rejected ballots | | 8 |
| Turnout | | 134.33% |

=== 1999 election ===
1999 Nunavut general election
| Candidate | Votes | % |
|---|---|---|
| Donald Havioyak | 200 | 35.15 |
| Ida Ayalik-McWilliam | 194 | 34.10 |
| Stanley K. Anablak | 125 | 21.97 |
| Kevin Bryce Niptanatiak | 50 | 8.78 |
| Eligible voters | | 649 |
| Total valid ballots | | 569 |
| Rejected ballots | | 0 |
| Turnout | | 87.67% |

== See also ==
- List of Nunavut territorial electoral districts
- Canadian provincial electoral districts
