= Umingmaktok =

Abandoned settlement in Nunavut, Canada

Umingmaktok Umingmaktuuq
- Settlement
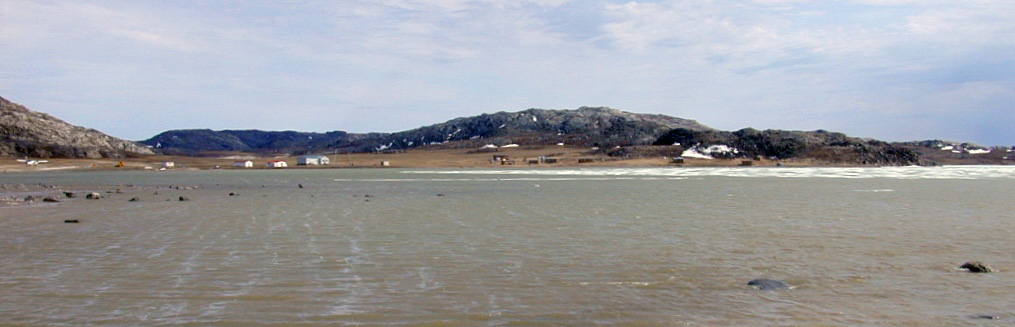

- Location within Nunavut
- Coordinates: 67°41′45″N 107°56′45″W
- Country: Canada
- Territory: Nunavut
- Region: Kitikmeot
- Electoral district: Cambridge Bay

Government
  - MLA: Fred Pedersen

Area
  - Total: 99.95 km^{2} (38.59 sq mi)
- Elevation (2021): 0 m (0 ft)

Population (2021)
  - Total: 0
  - Density: 0.0/km^{2} (0.0/sq mi)
- Time zone: UTC−07:00 (MST)
  - Summer (DST): UTC−06:00 (MDT)
- Canadian Postal code: X0B 2A0

Umingmaktok (Inuinnaqtun: Umingmaktuuq (Note: Inuinnaqtun is written with the Latin alphabet. In communities which speak this language, Inuktitut syllabics are mainly used by the Government of Nunavut.) "like a musk ox", or "he or she caught a muskox") is a ghost town on Bathurst Inlet in the Kitikmeot of the Canadian territory of Nunavut. The community was previously known as Bay Chimo.

The area around Umingmaktuuq is said to be rich in wildlife such as the Arctic fox, fur seals, barren-ground caribou, Arctic char and muskox.

With less than two dozen residents, Umingmaktuuq was one of the smallest permanent non-military communities in Nunavut. At one time, the community had a school that provided education up to Grade 6. Later, any students were flown to Cambridge Bay and returned to the community only for the summer and Christmas.

The community had no electricity other than that provided by portable generators, and communication with the outside world was by satellite phone. The only access to the community was by chartered aircraft, and the landing strip divided Umingmaktuuq in half. On one side was the old Hudson's Bay Company buildings and the Co-op store, and on the other was the main residential area.

== History ==
In 1920, Christian Klengenberg over-wintered in Bathurst Inlet to trap fox for the fur trade. At that time, Copper Inuit who still lived a traditional lifestyle settled at Umingmaktok seasonally in the winter.

In 1964, the Hudson's Bay Company (HBC) relocated its post from Bathurst Inlet to Umingmaktok (but was still called the Bathurst Inlet post). It closed in 1970.

In 1986, Umingmaktok was still permanently inhabited and had a general store, one-room school house (with kindergarten to grade 3 - higher grades were taught by correspondence), and about 12 single-room homes built in the 1960s. Supplies would be brought in from Cambridge Bay by barge or by snowmobile in the winter. Medical services were provided 3 times per year, while police would come from the Cambridge Bay Royal Canadian Mounted Police detachment only as needed.

== Demographics ==
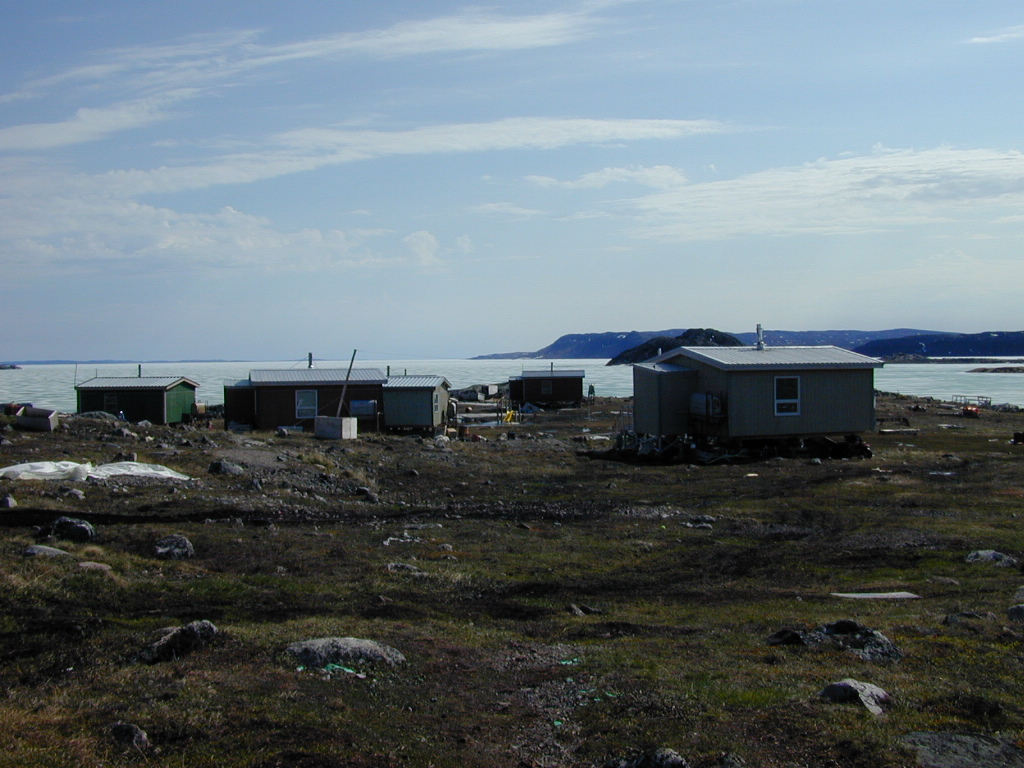
Umingmaktok 20 June 1999

In the 2021 Canadian census conducted by Statistics Canada, Umingmaktok had a population of 0, no change from its 2016 population. With a land area of 99.95 km^{2} (38.59 sq mi), it had a population density of 0.0/km^{2} (0.0/sq mi) in 2021.

Federal census population history of Umingmaktok

Year	Pop.	±%
1976	39	—
1981	60	+53.8%
1986	61	+1.7%
1991	56	−8.2%
1996	51	−8.9%

Year	Pop.	±%
2001	5	−90.2%
2006	0	−100.0%
2011	5	—
2016	0	−100.0%
2021	0	0.00%

Source: Statistics Canada

== See also ==
- List of communities in Nunavut
