= David Porter (Nunavut politician) =

Canadian politician

David Porter MLA

Member of the Legislative Assembly of Nunavut for Gjoa Haven
- Incumbent
- Assumed office October 27, 2025
- Preceded by: Tony Akoak

Personal details
- Party: Non-partisan consensus government

David Porter is a Canadian politician, who was elected to the Legislative Assembly of Nunavut in the 2025 Nunavut general election. He represents the electoral district of Gjoa Haven.

Porter worked as a constituency assistant for the riding's previous MLA, Tony Akoak.
