= Simon Kuliktana =

Canadian politician

Simon Kuliktana MLA

Member of the Legislative Assembly of Nunavut for Kugluktuk
- Incumbent
- Assumed office October 27, 2025
- Preceded by: Bobby Anavilok

Personal details
- Party: Non-partisan consensus government

Simon Kuliktana is a Canadian politician, who was elected to the Legislative Assembly of Nunavut in the 2025 Nunavut general election. He represents the electoral district of Kugluktuk.

Kuliktana is a former mayor of Kugluktuk and works for the territorial government as a development officer for sports and recreation.
