= Kangiqhuk =

Fjord on Victoria Island

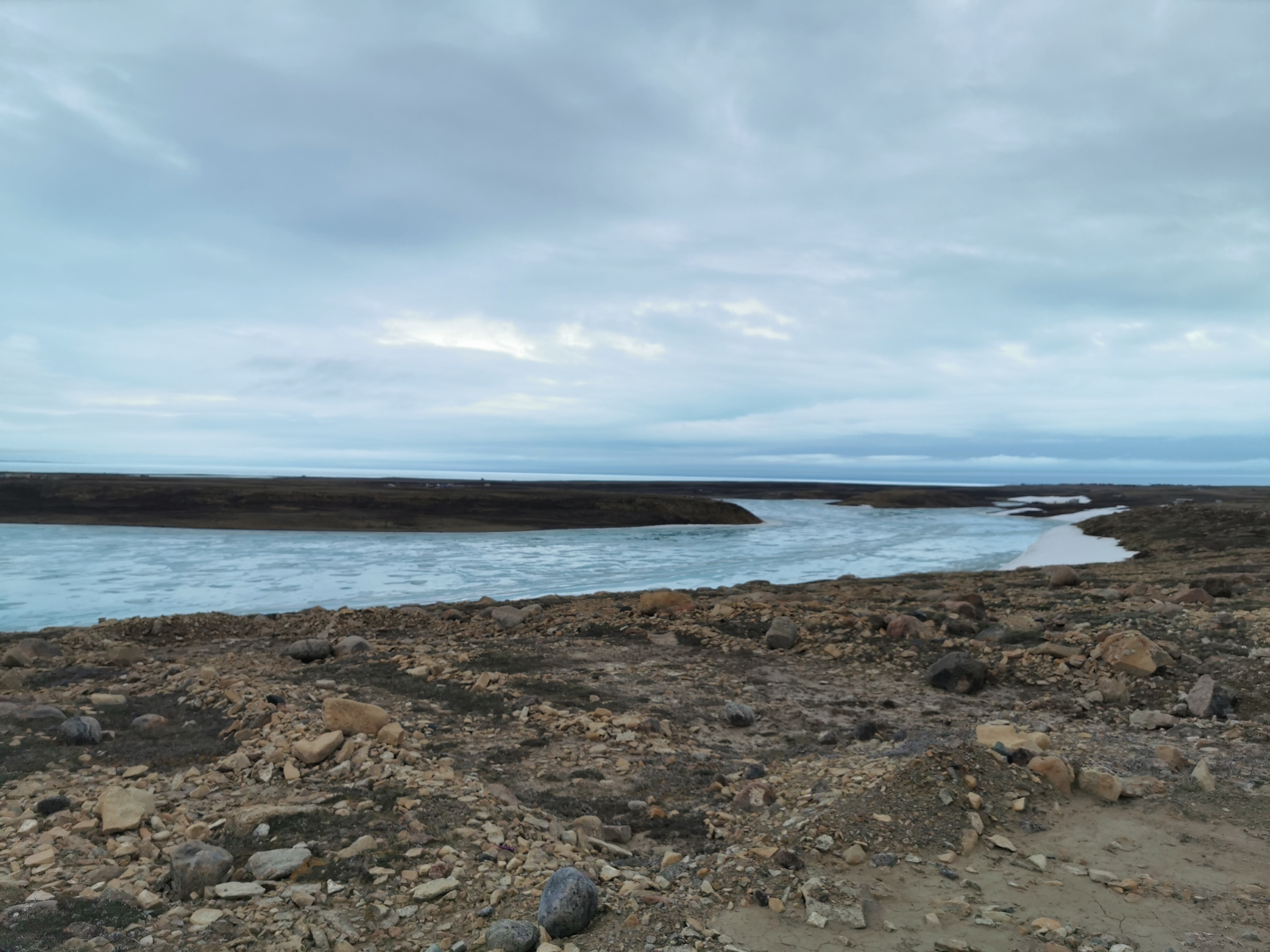
- Looking to the west and the head of the fiord.

- Location in Nunavut
- Location: Victoria Island, Nunavut
- Coordinates: 69°06′23″N 105°09′26″W
- Ocean/sea sources: Cambridge Bay
- Basin countries: Canada
- Settlements: Cambridge Bay

Kangiqhuk, formerly West Arm, is a fiord on the southeast coast of Victoria Island in Canada. The fiord is short, about 5 km (3.1 mi), and flows into Cambridge Bay and then to Dease Strait and Queen Maud Gulf. The hamlet of Cambridge Bay is located close to the fiord and Cambridge Bay Airport is situated on the north side of the arm.

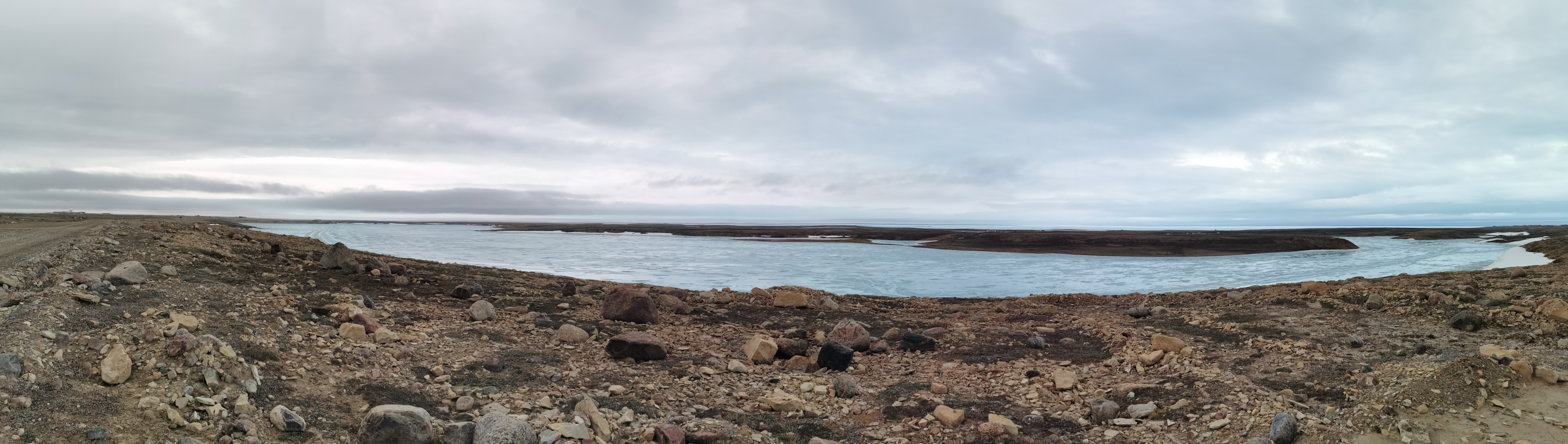
Looking from the east (left) to west and the head of the fiord
