= Fred Pedersen =

Canadian politician

Fred Pedersen MLA
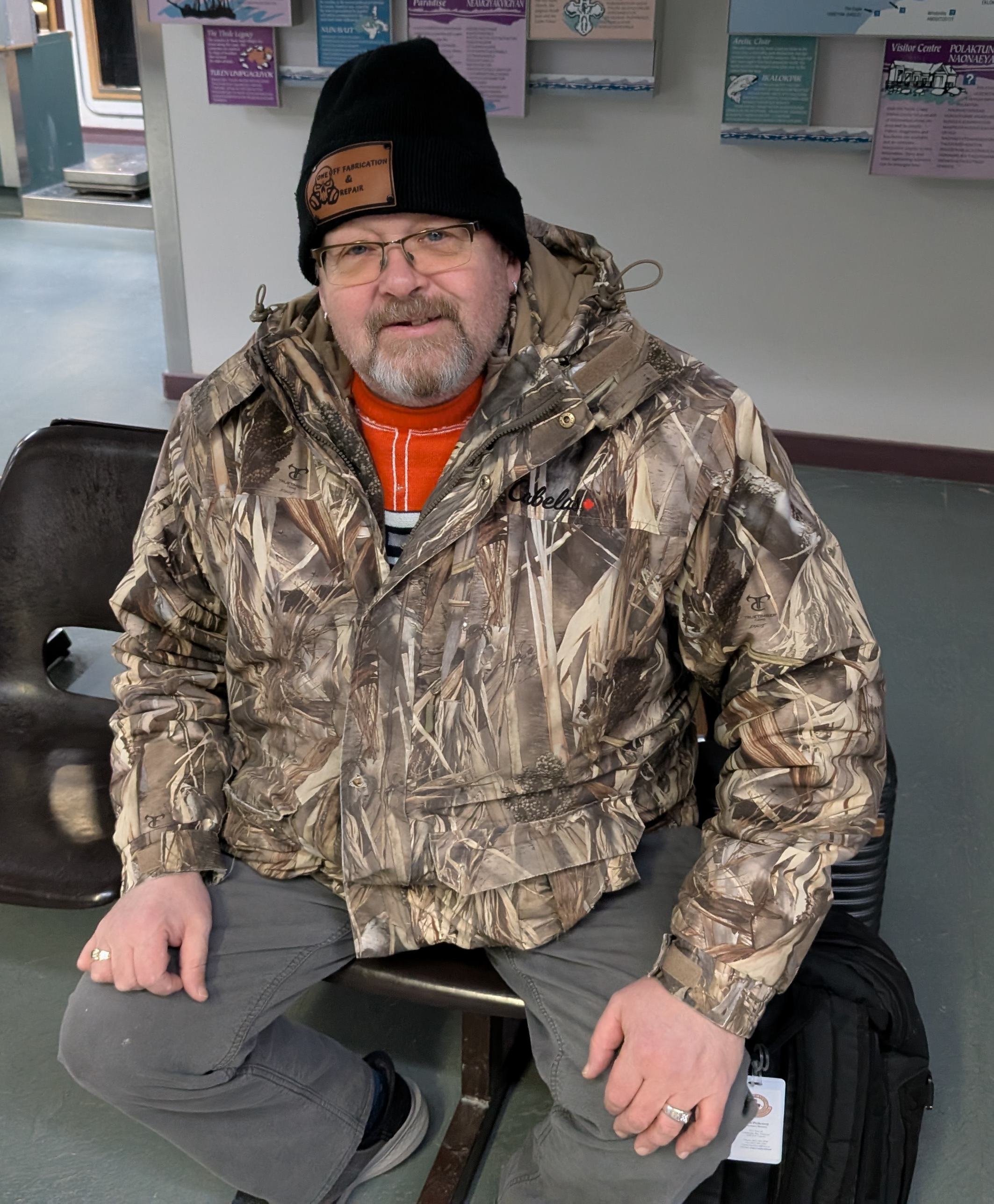

Member of the Legislative Assembly of Nunavut for Cambridge Bay
- Incumbent
- Assumed office October 27, 2025
- Preceded by: Pam Gross

Personal details
- Party: Non-partisan consensus government
- Parents: Red Pedersen (father); Lena Pedersen (mother)
- Occupation: Executive Director of the Kitkmeot Inuit Association

Fred Pedersen is a Canadian politician, who was elected to the Legislative Assembly of Nunavut in the 2025 Nunavut general election. He represents the electoral district of Cambridge Bay.

Pedersen, son of Lena and Red Pedersen, had taken a leave of absence from his position as Executive Director of the Kitkmeot Inuit Association.
