= Kugluktuk =

Kugluktuk Qurluqtuq ᖁᕐᓗᖅᑐᖅ
- Hamlet
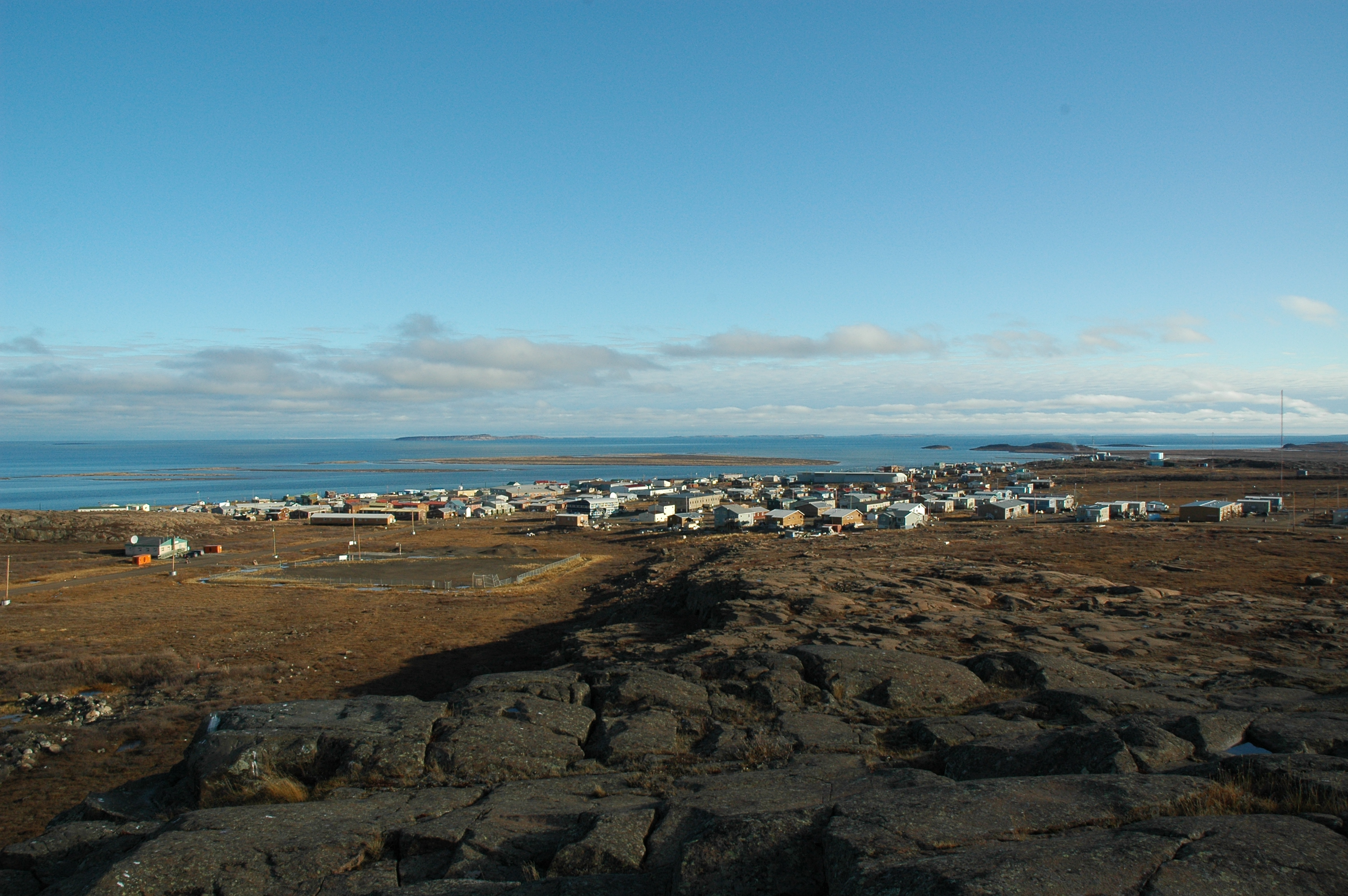
- Hill top view of Kugluktuk

- Location within Nunavut Location within Canada
- Coordinates: 67°49′36″N 115°05′36″W
- Country: Canada
- Territory: Nunavut
- Region: Kitikmeot
- Electoral district: Kugluktuk

Government
  - Mayor: Ryan Nivingalok
  - MLA: Simon Kuliktana

Area (2021)
  - Land: 538.99 km^{2} (208.11 sq mi)
- Elevation: 23 m (75 ft)

Population (2021)
  - Total: 1,382
  - Density: 2.6/km^{2} (6.7/sq mi)
  - DPL: 956
- Time zone: UTC−07:00 (MST)
  - Summer (DST): UTC−06:00 (MDT)
- Canadian Postal code: X0B 0E0
- Area code: 867

Kugluktuk (Qurluqtuq, lit. 'the place of moving water'; Inuktitut syllabics: ᖁᕐᓗᖅᑐᖅ; Inuktitut pronunciation: [quʁluqtuq]), known as Coppermine until 1 January 1996, is a hamlet at the mouth of the Coppermine River in the Kitikmeot Region of Nunavut, Canada, on Coronation Gulf, southwest of Victoria Island. It is Nunavut's westernmost community, near the border with the Northwest Territories.

The area's traditional language is Inuinnaqtun, which is written in the Latin alphabet, rather than the syllabics of the Inuktitut writing system. Like Cambridge Bay, Bathurst Inlet, and Umingmaktok, syllabics are rarely seen and are used mainly by the Government of Nunavut.

== History ==
Prior to European contact, Dene travelled to the area and interacted acrimoniously with nearby Thule and Inuit, sometimes ending in deadly raids against each other (see Bloody Falls massacre). In July 1821, the British Coppermine expedition team reached the mouth of the Coppermine River, just next to the present day community of Kugluktuk. Arctic explorers Peter Warren Dease and Thomas Simpson reached this area in 1838 to survey from Coronation Gulf at the mouth of Coppermine River to southern Boothia Peninsula. Dease noted that while his group camped near Bloody Falls, the Copper Inuit would flee when his party approached their camps. Between 1913 and 1916, anthropologist Diamond Jenness studied and recorded the traditional lifestyle of Inuit around Kugluktuk. Danish fur trader Christian Klengenberg constructed a trading post in 1916 which formed a permanent year-round community known as Fort Hearne. The Hudson Bay Company established a trading post at this community in 1927. Fort Hearne was renamed to Coppermine in 1930. The Royal Canadian Mounted Police built a police station in 1932. The former name of the community, Coppermine, was named after its namesake Coppermine River.

An Indian federal day school (Federal Tent Hostel at Coppermine) opened in 1951 and closed in 1959. Construction of the Distant Early Warning Line (DEW Line) sites, Lady Franklin Point and Bernard Harbour, on the opposite shore of Coronation Gulf in 1955 created some employment opportunities for the locals.

In 1982, a division plebiscite was held. About 80% of the population in what is now Nunavut voted in favour of division; Coppermine was one of only two communities to vote against it, Cambridge Bay was the other.

In 1996, a healing ceremony between Dene and Inuit took place to reconcile for historical grievances. The community also changed its name from Coppermine to Kugluktuk on 1 January 1996.

== Demographics ==
Federal census population history of Kugluktuk
Year	Pop.	±%
1976	758	—
1981	809	+6.7%
1986	888	+9.8%
1991	1,059	+19.3%
1996	1,201	+13.4%
2001	1,212	+0.9%
2006	1,302	+7.4%
2011	1,450	+11.4%
2016	1,491	+2.8%
2021	1,382	−7.3%
Source: Statistics Canada

As a census subdivision in the 2021 Canadian census conducted by Statistics Canada, Kugluktuk had a population of 1,382 living in 397 of its 438 total private dwellings, a change of −7.3% from its 2016 population of 1,491. With a land area of 538.99 km^{2} (208.11 sq mi), it had a population density of 2.6/km^{2} in 2021.

As a designated place in the 2021 census, Kugluktuk had a population of 956 living in 265 of its 296 total private dwellings, a change of −9.6% from its 2016 population of 1,057. With a land area of 0.34 km^{2} (0.13 sq mi), it had a population density of 2,811.8/km^{2} (7,282.4/sq mi) in 2021.

== Infrastructure ==
The community has been served by the Qiniq network since 2005. Qiniq is a fixed wireless service to homes and businesses, connecting to the outside world via a satellite backbone. The Qiniq network is designed and operated by SSi Canada. In 2018, the network was upgraded to 4G LTE technology, and 2G-GSM for mobile voice.

== Education ==
Kugluktuk's two schools are Kugluktuk High School and Jimmy Hikok Ilihakvik.

== Geography ==
Kugluktuk is on the shore of the Arctic Ocean. The surrounding landscape is dominated by the rocky and often barren Canadian Shield. The region has a subarctic climate, but barely so, with July having an average of 10.9 °C (51.6 °F). It has cold, dry winters, and moderate snowfall that is relatively high for its latitude. Trees do exist in the region due to microclimate, but they are dwarfed and extremely sparse.

=== Flora ===
Plant growth in the region during the summer includes small shrubs, grass, moss, lichens, blueberries, blackberries, cranberries, various flowers, and dwarf willow and birch trees.

=== Climate ===
Kugluktuk features a subarctic climate (Köppen climate classification: Dfc); like most of mainland Nunavut; with wet summers and dry winters. It is in the transitional zone to a cold tundra climate (ET), but falls outside of it, since its warmest month of July surpasses the 10 °C (50 °F) isotherm, averaging 10.9 °C (51.6 °F).

The highest temperature ever recorded in Kugluktuk was 34.9 °C (94.8 °F) on 15 July 1989. The coldest temperature ever recorded was −50.0 °C (−58.0 °F) on 2 February 1968.

Climate data for Kugluktuk (Kugluktuk Airport) WMO ID: 71938; coordinates 67°49′00″N 115°08′38″W; elevation: 22.6 m (74 ft); 1991–2020 normals, extremes 1930–present (Note: Climate data was recorded at Coppermine from October 1930 to November 1977 and at Kugluktuk Airport from December 1977 to present.)
Month	Jan	Feb	Mar	Apr	May	Jun	Jul	Aug	Sep	Oct	Nov	Dec	Year
Record high humidex	0.3	−1.7	−0.3	8.9	19.8	30.3	36.8	36.8	25.8	13.1	2.2	−1.5	36.8
Record high °C (°F)	0.8 (33.4)	1.1 (34.0)	−0.1 (31.8)	9.8 (49.6)	23.3 (73.9)	32.5 (90.5)	34.9 (94.8)	30.3 (86.5)	26.1 (79.0)	13.9 (57.0)	4.4 (39.9)	4.4 (39.9)	34.9 (94.8)
Mean daily maximum °C (°F)	−22.5 (−8.5)	−22.8 (−9.0)	−20.1 (−4.2)	−11.6 (11.1)	−0.6 (30.9)	10.4 (50.7)	15.8 (60.4)	13.7 (56.7)	6.8 (44.2)	−2.9 (26.8)	−13.2 (8.2)	−20.1 (−4.2)	−5.6 (21.9)
Daily mean °C (°F)	−26.6 (−15.9)	−27.0 (−16.6)	−24.6 (−12.3)	−16.4 (2.5)	−4.5 (23.9)	5.9 (42.6)	11.2 (52.2)	9.6 (49.3)	3.6 (38.5)	−5.9 (21.4)	−17.1 (1.2)	−24.1 (−11.4)	−9.7 (14.5)
Mean daily minimum °C (°F)	−30.7 (−23.3)	−31.3 (−24.3)	−29.1 (−20.4)	−21.2 (−6.2)	−8.5 (16.7)	1.4 (34.5)	6.5 (43.7)	5.4 (41.7)	0.3 (32.5)	−9.0 (15.8)	−21.0 (−5.8)	−28.1 (−18.6)	−13.8 (7.2)
Record low °C (°F)	−47.8 (−54.0)	−50.0 (−58.0)	−48.9 (−56.0)	−43.9 (−47.0)	−31.1 (−24.0)	−15.0 (5.0)	−0.8 (30.6)	−4.4 (24.1)	−20.0 (−4.0)	−35.4 (−31.7)	−41.1 (−42.0)	−45.0 (−49.0)	−50.0 (−58.0)
Record low wind chill	−64.3	−64.4	−65.0	−54.4	−39.7	−15.6	−5.9	−11.8	−22.9	−46.5	−54.1	−61.5	−65.0
Average precipitation mm (inches)	9.2 (0.36)	7.0 (0.28)	9.3 (0.37)	7.9 (0.31)	14.5 (0.57)	17.4 (0.69)	45.2 (1.78)	42.3 (1.67)	35.5 (1.40)	23.3 (0.92)	10.9 (0.43)	10.6 (0.42)	233.1 (9.18)
Average rainfall mm (inches)	0.1 (0.00)	0.0 (0.0)	0.0 (0.0)	0.1 (0.00)	4.3 (0.17)	14.6 (0.57)	44.4 (1.75)	44.9 (1.77)	31.4 (1.24)	4.7 (0.19)	0.0 (0.0)	0.0 (0.0)	144.5 (5.69)
Average snowfall cm (inches)	19.6 (7.7)	16.3 (6.4)	19.4 (7.6)	18.2 (7.2)	16.2 (6.4)	2.1 (0.8)	0.0 (0.0)	0.2 (0.1)	7.7 (3.0)	35.0 (13.8)	25.5 (10.0)	21.9 (8.6)	182.1 (71.7)
Average precipitation days (≥ 0.2 mm)	9.7	8.7	10.1	7.7	8.5	8.3	11.8	13.0	13.0	14.5	10.6	10.3	126.2
Average rainy days (≥ 0.2 mm)	0.0	0.0	0.0	0.2	1.9	6.8	11.5	13.1	10.5	2.3	0.0	0.0	46.4
Average snowy days (≥ 0.2 cm)	10.5	10.1	11.6	9.5	7.2	1.3	0.1	0.2	3.7	14.5	13.4	11.6	93.6
Average relative humidity (%) (at 1500 LST)	76.7	75.1	77.5	82.3	83.1	70.2	64.8	69.8	75.5	84.7	80.9	77.8	76.5
Average dew point °C (°F)	−30.6 (−23.1)	−31.3 (−24.3)	−30.2 (−22.4)	−20.8 (−5.4)	−7.5 (18.5)	0.8 (33.4)	5.5 (41.9)	4.6 (40.3)	−0.3 (31.5)	−8.3 (17.1)	−21.5 (−6.7)	−29.7 (−21.5)	−14.1 (6.6)
Mean monthly sunshine hours	17.8	77.3	160.3	233.3	246.7	375.0	341.6	207.7	91.1	51.2	19.6	0.2	1,821.7
Percentage possible sunshine	17.7	35.5	44.4	49.6	38.7	52.1	48.5	38.5	22.8	17.6	12.7	0.7	31.6
Source: Environment and Climate Change Canada (rain/rain days, snow/snow days, humidex, wind chill, humidity 1981–2010) Canadian Climate Normals 1981–2010 (dew point 1951–1980)

== Notable people ==
- Stacey Aglok MacDonald
- Peggy Ekagina
- Joe Allen Evyagotailak
- Donald Havioyak
- Lena Pedersen
- John Sperry

== Gallery ==
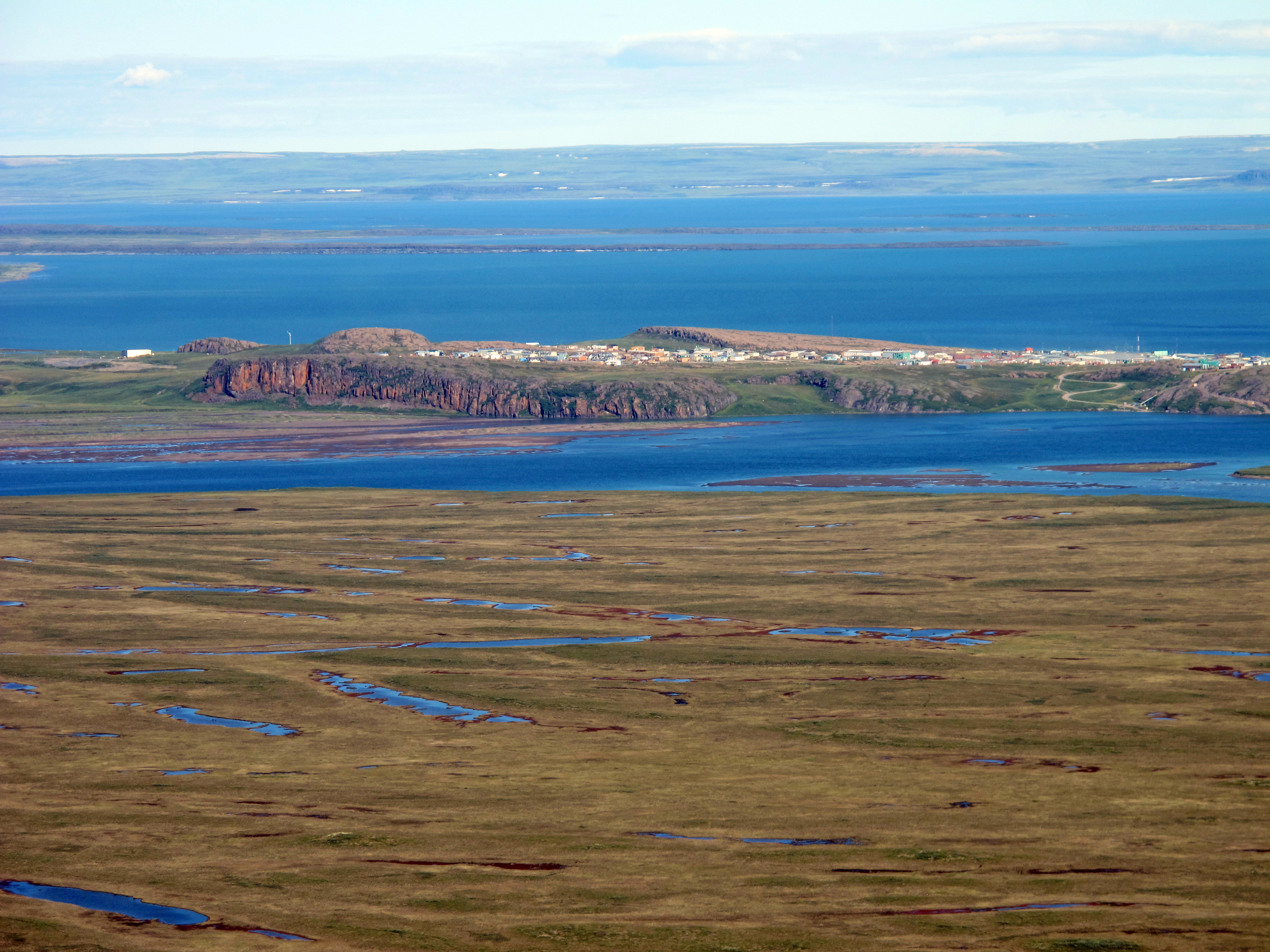
Kugluktuk NU

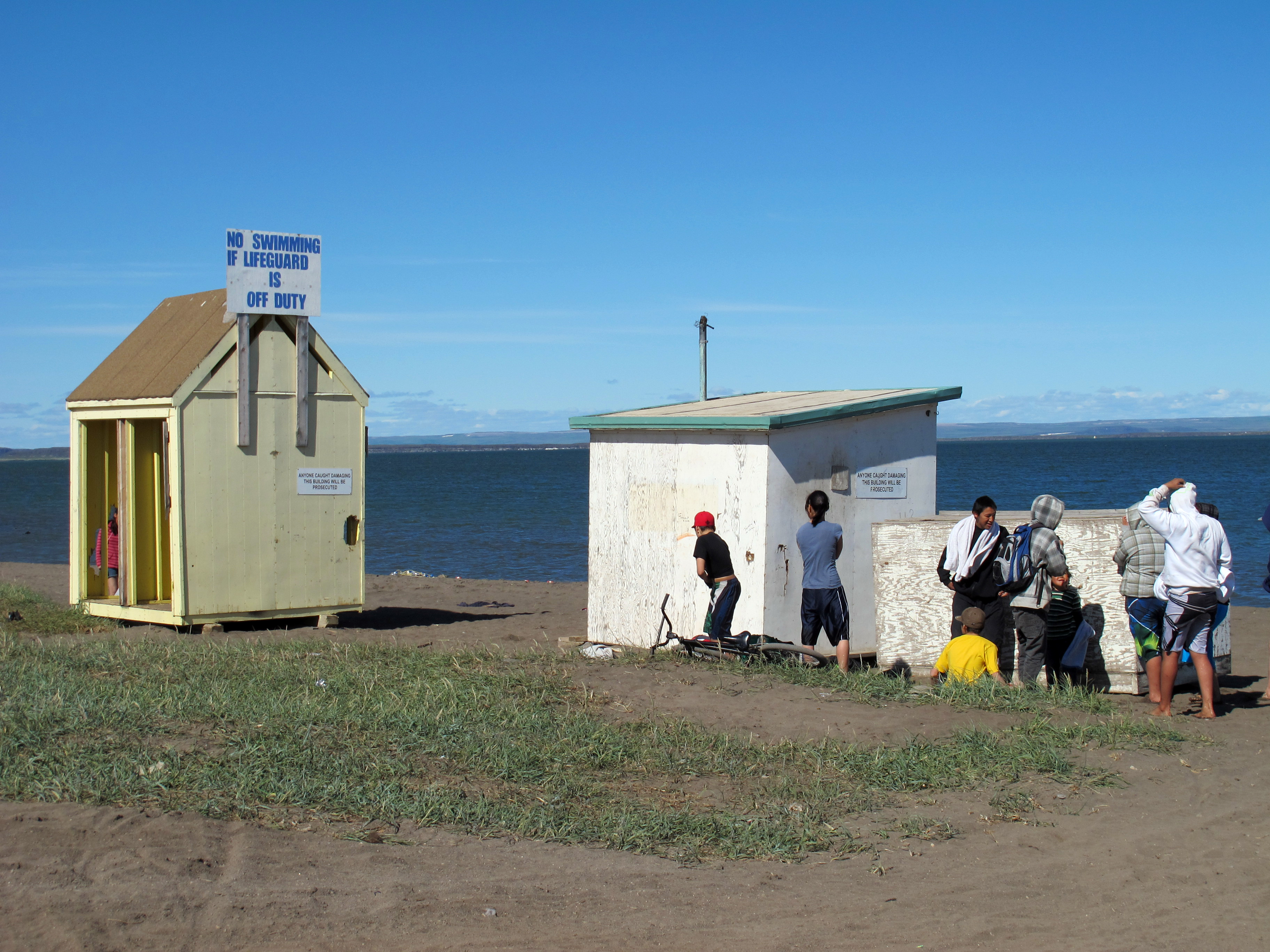
A lifeguard is stationed at the beach on hot days

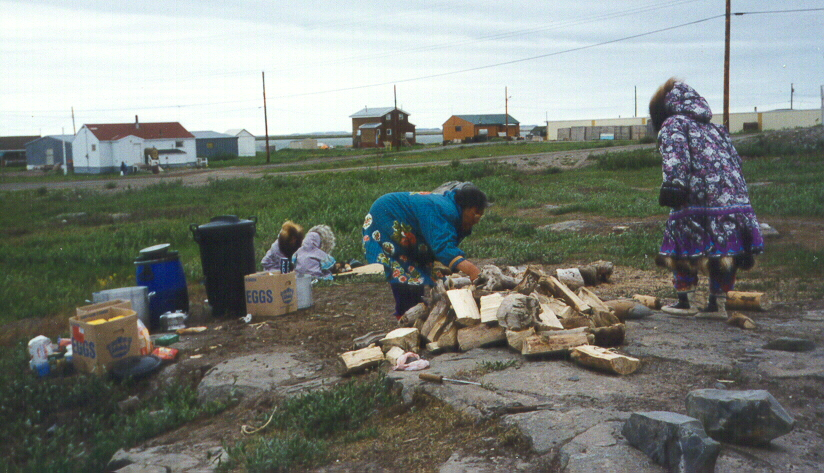
Inuit women preparing to make bannock at Kugluktuk

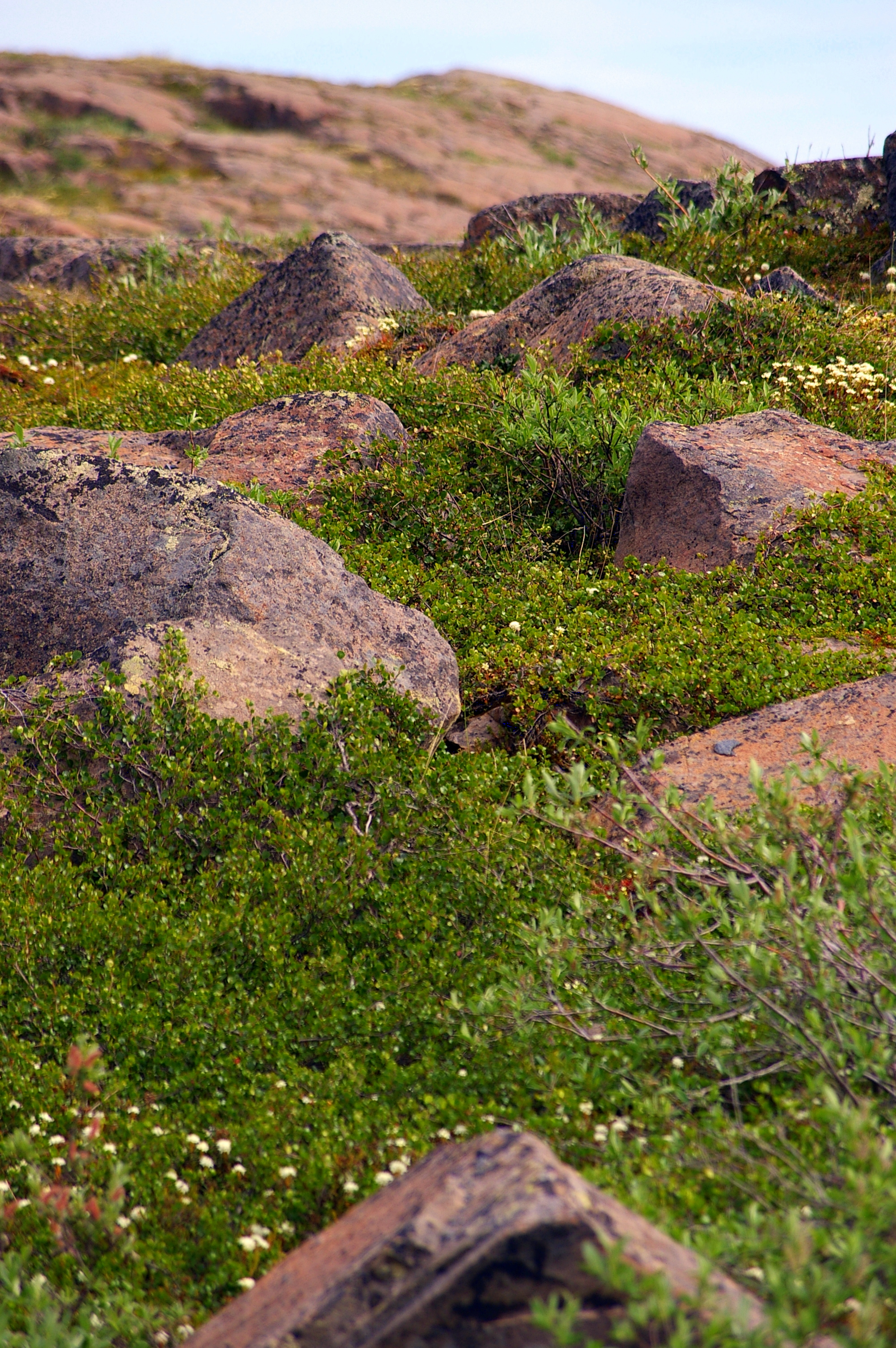
Wildflowers in Kugluktuk

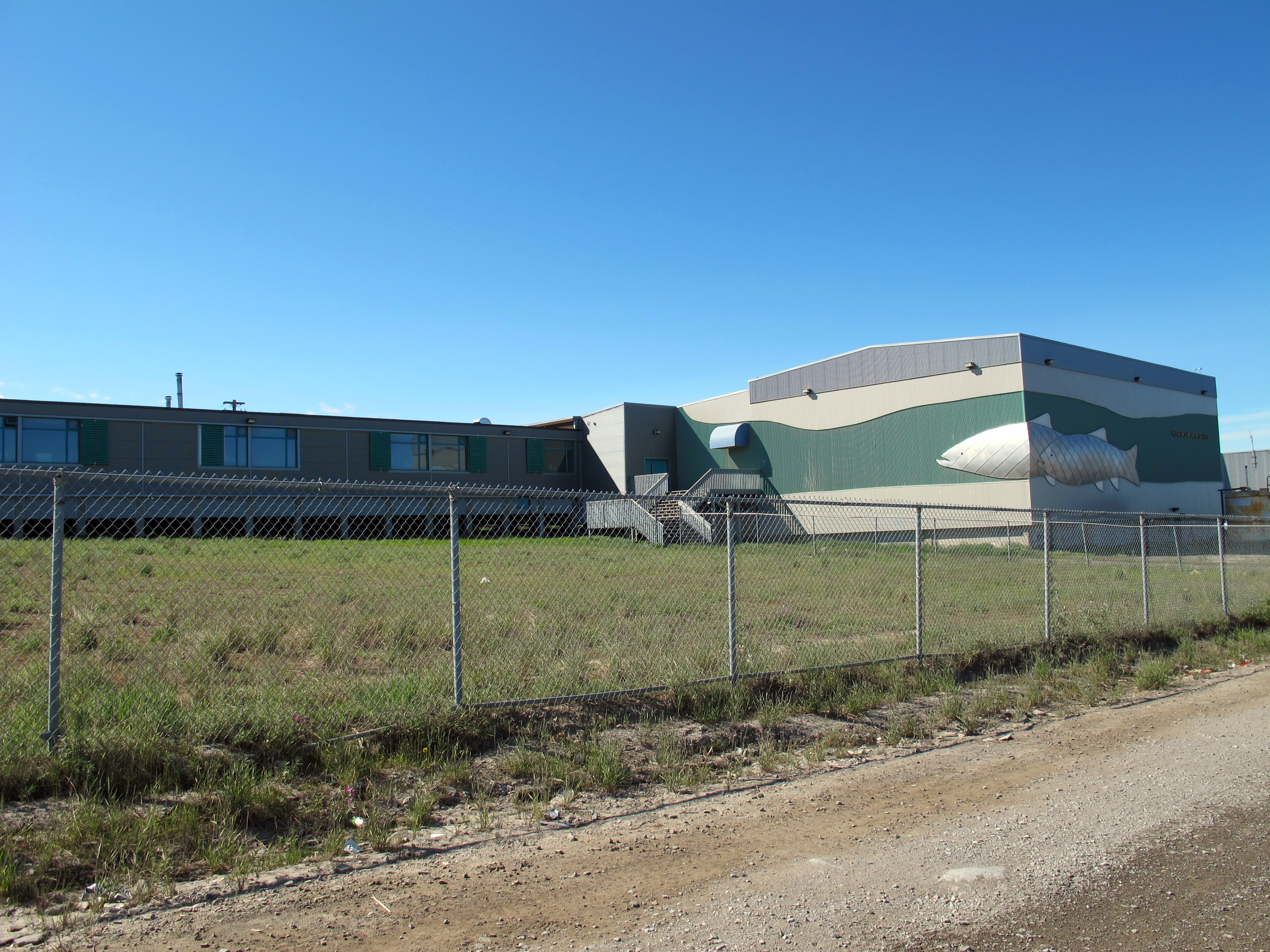
Grades 6 to 12 with a student population of about 150

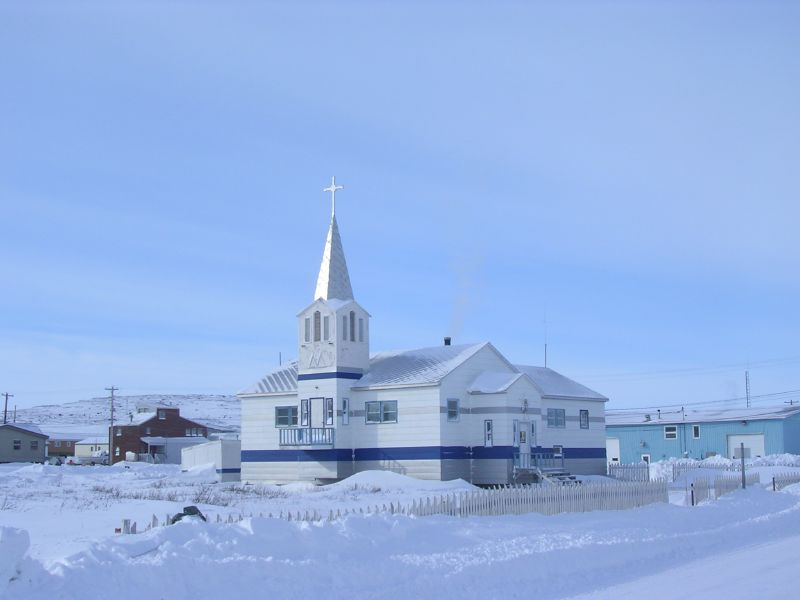
The Roman Catholic Church at Kugluktuk

== See also ==
- List of municipalities in Nunavut
- Kugluk/Bloody Falls Territorial Park
- Bloody Falls
- Kugluktuk Airport
- Kangiryuatjagmiut
- Kangiryuarmiut
