= 9th Northwest Territories Legislative Assembly =

9th Legislative Assembly

Type
- Type: Unicameral

History
- Established: 1979
- Disbanded: 1983
- Preceded by: 8th Northwest Territories Legislative Assembly
- Succeeded by: 10th Northwest Territories Legislative Assembly
- Seats: 22

Elections
- Last election: 1979

Meeting place
- Yellowknife

The 9th Northwest Territories Legislative Assembly was the 16th assembly of the territorial government from 1979 to 1983. The Commissioner turned over Executive Council privileges allowing elected members to form the cabinet and become leader of government in 1980 for the first time since 1905. From the 1979 Northwest Territories general election that was held on October 1, 1979, 22 members were elected to the Northwest Territories Legislative Assembly.

== Members of the Legislative Assembly ==
9th Northwest Territories Legislative Assembly
District	Member	First elected / previously elected	No. of terms
Baffin Central	James Arreak	1979	1st term
Baffin Central	Ipeelee Kilabuk (1980)	1975, 1980	2nd term*
Baffin South	Joe Arlooktoo	1979	1st term
Central Arctic	Kane Tologanak	1979	1st term
Foxe Basin	Mark Evaloarjuk	1975	2nd term
Frobisher Bay	Dennis Patterson	1979	1st term
Great Slave East	Robert Sayine	1979	1st term
Hay River	Donald Morton Stewart	1967, 1975	3rd term*
High Arctic	Ludy Pudluk	1975	2nd term
Hudson Bay	Moses Appaqaq	1979	1st term
Inuvik	Tom Butters	1970	3rd term
Keewatin North	William Noah	1979	1st term
Keewatin North	Gordon Wray (1983)	1983	1st term
Keewatin South	Tagak Curley	1979	1st term
Mackenzie Delta	Richard Nerysoo	1979	1st term
Mackenzie Great Bear	Peter Fraser	1976	2nd term
Mackenzie-Laird	Nick Sibbeston	1970, 1979	2nd term*
Pine Point	Bruce McLaughlin	1979	1st term
Rae-Lac La Martre	James Wah-Shee	1975, 1979	2nd term*
Slave River	Arnold McCallum	1975	2nd term
Western Arctic	Nellie Cournoyea	1979	1st term
Yellowknife Centre	Robert H. MacQuarrie	1979	1st term
Yellowknife North	George Braden	1979	1st term
Yellowknife South	Lynda Sorenson	1979	1st term

== By-elections ==
At least 2 by-elections occurred in this Assembly.

District	Former member	Replacement	Reason	Date
Baffin Central	James Arreak	Ipeelee Kilabuk	Resignation	April 1, 1980
Keewatin North	William Noah	Gordon Wray	Unknown	1983
