= 10th Northwest Territories Legislative Assembly =

10th Legislative Assembly

Type
- Type: Unicameral

History
- Established: 1983
- Disbanded: 1987
- Preceded by: 9th Northwest Territories Legislative Assembly
- Succeeded by: 11th Northwest Territories Legislative Assembly
- Seats: 24

Elections
- Last election: 1983

Meeting place
- Yellowknife

The 10th Northwest Territories Legislative Assembly was the 17th assembly of the territorial government held between 1983 and 1987.

== 3rd Session ==
The spring field session of the Legislative Assembly was held from June 5, 1985, to June 13, 1985, in the gymnasium of Maani Ulujuk School in Rankin Inlet, Nunavut. This was the first time since 1976 that the legislature was held in the community.

=== District renaming ===
Three electoral districts were renamed in the June 1985 spring session to better reflect the quality of the areas represented. Deh Cho Gah became Nahendeh meaning Our Land, Kitikimeot East became Natilikmiot meaning people of seals and Foxe Basin was renamed Amittuq meaning a long, narrow land formation.

== Members of the Legislative Assembly ==
10th Northwest Territories Legislative Assembly
District	Member	First elected / previously elected	No. of terms
Aivilik	Tagak Curley	1979	2nd term
Baffin Central	Pauloosie Paniloo	1983	1st term
Baffin South	Joe Arlooktoo	1979	2nd term
Deh Cho	Samuel Gargan	1983	1st term
Deh Cho Gah	Nick Sibbeston	1970, 1979	3rd term*
Central Arctic	Kane Tologanak	1979	2nd term
Foxe Basin	Elijah Erkloo	1983	1st term
Hay River	Donald Morton Stewart	1967, 1975	4th term*
High Arctic	Ludy Pudluk	1975	3rd term
Hudson Bay	Moses Appaqaq	1979	2nd term
Inuvik	Tom Butters	1970	4th term
Iqaluit	Dennis Patterson	1979	2nd term
Kitikmeot East	Michael Angottitauruq	1983	1st term
Kitikmeot West	Red Pedersen	1983	1st term
Kivallivik	Gordon Wray	1983	1st term
Mackenzie Delta	Richard Nerysoo	1979	2nd term
Nunakput	Nellie Cournoyea	1979	2nd term
Pine Point	Bruce McLaughlin	1979	2nd term
Rae-Lac La Martre	James Wah-Shee	1975, 1979	3rd term*
Sahtu	John T'Seleie	1983	1st term
Slave River	Arnold McCallum	1975	3rd term
Tu Nedhe	Eliza Lawrence	1983	1st term
Yellowknife Centre	Robert H. MacQuarrie	1979	2nd term
Yellowknife North	Michael Ballantyne	1983	1st term
Yellowknife South	Lynda Sorenson	1979	2nd term
