= 11th Northwest Territories Legislative Assembly =

11th Legislative Assembly

Type
- Type: Unicameral

History
- Established: 1987
- Disbanded: 1991
- Preceded by: 10th Northwest Territories Legislative Assembly
- Succeeded by: 12th Northwest Territories Legislative Assembly
- Seats: 24

Elections
- Last election: 1987

Meeting place
- Yellowknife

The 11th Northwest Territories Legislative Assembly was the 18th assembly of the territorial government from 1987 to 1991.

== Members of the Legislative Assembly ==
11th Northwest Territories Legislative Assembly
District	Member	First elected / previously elected	No. of terms
Aivilik	Piita Irniq	1975, 1987	2nd term*
Amittuq	Titus Allooloo	1987	1st term
Baffin Central	Ipeelee Kilabuk	1987	1st term
Baffin South	Joe Arlooktoo	1979	3rd term
Deh Cho	Samuel Gargan	1983	2nd term
Hay River	John Pollard	1987	1st term
High Arctic	Ludy Pudluk	1975	4th term
Hudson Bay	Charlie Crow	1987	1st term
Inuvik	Tom Butters	1970	5th term
Iqaluit	Dennis Patterson	1979	3rd term
Kitikmeot West	Red Pedersen	1983	2nd term
Kivallivik	Gordon Wray	1983	2nd term
Mackenzie Delta	Richard Nerysoo	1979	3rd term
Nahendeh	Nick Sibbeston	1970, 1979	4th term*
Natilikmiot	Michael Angottitauruq	1983	2nd term
Natilikmiot	John Ningark (1989)	1989	1st term
Nunakput	Nellie Cournoyea	1979	3rd term
Pine Point	Bruce McLaughlin	1979	3rd term
Rae-Lac La Martre	Henry Zoe	1987	1st term
Sahtu	Stephen Kakfwi	1987	1st term
Slave River	Jeannie Marie-Jewell	1987	1st term
Tu Nedhe	Don Morin	1987	1st term
Yellowknife Centre	Brian Lewis	1987	1st term
Yellowknife North	Michael Ballantyne	1983	2nd term
Yellowknife South	Ted Richard	1987	1st term
Yellowknife South	Tony Whitford (1988)	1988	1st term

== By-elections ==
At least two by-elections occurred in this Assembly.

District	Former member	Replacement	Reason	Date
Yellowknife South	Ted Richard	Tony Whitford	Ted Richard appointed to Northwest Territories Supreme Court.	October 31, 1988
Natilikmiot	Michael Angottitauruq	John Ningark	Unknown	1989
