= 8th Northwest Territories Legislative Assembly =

8th Legislative Assembly

Type
- Type: Unicameral

History
- Established: 1975
- Disbanded: 1979
- Preceded by: 7th Northwest Territories Legislative Council
- Succeeded by: 9th Northwest Territories Legislative Assembly
- Seats: 15

Elections
- Last election: 1975

Meeting place
- Yellowknife

The 8th Northwest Territories Legislative Assembly was the 15th assembly of the territorial government. The assembly lasted from 1975 until 1979. This was the first all elected council of the Northwest Territories since the 5th North West Assembly from 1902 to 1905. In honor of this achievement the Council renamed themselves the Legislative Assembly of the Northwest Territories despite still being officially called the Council of the Northwest Territories under the Northwest Territories Act.

== Members of the Legislative Assembly ==
8th Northwest Territories Legislative Assembly
District	Member	First elected / previously elected	No. of terms
Central Arctic	William Lyall	1975	1st term
Central Baffin	Ipeelee Kilabuk	1975	1st term
Foxe Basin	Mark Evaloarjuk	1975	1st term
Great Slave	James Wah-Shee	1975	1st term
Great Slave	Richard D. Whitford (1976)	1976	1st term
Hay River	Donald Morton Stewart	1967, 1975	2nd term*
High Arctic	Ludy Pudluk	1975	1st term
Inuvik	Tom Butters	1970	2nd term
Keewatin	Peter Irniq	1975	1st term
Mackenzie Great Bear	George Barnaby	1975	1st term
Mackenzie Great Bear	Peter Fraser (1976)	1976	1st term
Mackenzie-Laird	William Lafferty	1975	1st term
Slave River	Arnold McCallum	1975	1st term
South Baffin	Bryan Pearson	1970	2nd term
Western Arctic	John Steen	1975	1st term
Yellowknife North	Dave Nickerson	1975	1st term
Yellowknife South	David Searle	1967	3rd term

== By-elections ==
At least two by-elections occurred in this assembly.

District	Former member	Replacement	Reason	Date
Great Slave	James Wah-Shee	Richard D. Whitford	Resignation of James Wah-Shee over lack of discussion on Dene issues.	1976
Mackenzie Great Bear	George Barnaby	Peter Fraser	Resignation of George Barnaby over lack of discussion on Dene issues.	1976
