= 12th Northwest Territories Legislative Assembly =

12th Legislative Assembly

Type
- Type: Unicameral

History
- Established: 1991
- Disbanded: 1995
- Preceded by: 11th Northwest Territories Legislative Assembly
- Succeeded by: 13th Northwest Territories Legislative Assembly
- Seats: 24

Elections
- Last election: 1991

Meeting place
- Yellowknife

The 12th Northwest Territories Legislative Assembly was the 19th assembly of the territorial government and lasted from 1991 until it was dissolved in 1995.

This was the first legislature to meet in the body's permanent home when that building was completed in 1993.

== Members of the Legislative Assembly ==
12th Northwest Territories Legislative Assembly
District	Member	First elected / previously elected	No. of terms
Aivilik	James Arvaluk	1991	1st term
Aivilik	Manitok Thompson (1995)	1995	1st term
Amittuq	Titus Allooloo	1987	2nd term
Baffin Central	Rebecca Mike	1991	1st term
Baffin South	Kenoayoak Pudlat	1991	1st term
Deh Cho	Samuel Gargan	1983	3rd term
Hay River	John Pollard	1987	2nd term
High Arctic	Ludy Pudluk	1975	5th term
Inuvik	Fred Koe	1991	1st term
Iqaluit	Dennis Patterson	1979	4th term
Keewatin Central	John Todd	1991	1st term
Kitikmeot	Ernie Bernhardt	1991	1st term
Kitikmeot	Kelvin Ng (1993)	1993	1st term
Kivallivik	Silas Arngna'naaq	1991	1st term
Mackenzie Delta	Richard Nerysoo	1979	4th term
Nahendeh	Jim Antoine	1991	1st term
Natilikmiot	John Ningark	1989	2nd term
North Slave	Henry Zoe	1987	2nd term
Nunakput	Nellie Cournoyea	1979	4th term
Sahtu	Stephen Kakfwi	1987	2nd term
Thebacha	Jeannie Marie-Jewell	1987	2nd term
Tu Nedhe	Don Morin	1987	2nd term
Yellowknife Centre	Brian Lewis	1987	2nd term
Yellowknife-Frame Lake	Charlie Dent	1991	1st term
Yellowknife North	Michael Ballantyne	1983	3rd term
Yellowknife South	Tony Whitford	1988	2nd term
