= 1983 Northwest Territories general election =

The 1983 Northwest Territories general election, in Canada, was held on November 21, 1983.

This was the first election for the Council of the Northwest Territories with live television coverage of vote returns.

== Election results ==
The election was held in 24 constituencies, up two from the previous general election in 1979, with 15,764 ballots cast, a turnout of 69.72%.

Outgoing Premier George Braden did not run for re-election. Richard Nerysoo was chosen as Premier January 12, 1984, and served for over a year until November 5, 1985; Nick Sibbeston was designated Premier following his resignation.

=== Candidates and results ===
Summary
1979	1983	Did not run again	Defeated	Reelected
22	24	3	3	16

=== Candidates ===
Results by District
District	Winner	Second	Third	Fourth	Fifth	Sixth	Incumbent
Aivilik	Tagak Curley*; 420 (50.2%)	Piita Irniq; 417 (49.8%)					new district
Baffin Central	Pauloosie Paniloo; 307 (51.8%)	Iola Matuq; 286 (48.2%)					Ipeelee Kilabuk
Baffin South	Joe Arlooktoo; 145 (40.9%)	Kananginak Pootoogook; 113 (31.8%)	Joanasie Salomonie; 97 (27.3%)				Joe Arlooktoo
Deh Cho	Samuel Gargan; 177 (59.6%)	Joachim Bonnetrouge; 120 (39.7%)					new district
Deh Cho Gah	Nick Sibbeston*; 428 (51.0%)	Bill Lafferty; 411 (49.0%)					new district
Foxe Basin	Elijah Erkloo; 196 (33.5%)	Mark Evaluarjuk; 159 (27.1%)	James Arvaluk; 148 (25.3%)	John Illupalik; 80 (13.7%)			Mark Evaluarjuk
Hay River	Don Stewart; 624 (50.3%)	Don Ferguson; 616 (49.7%)					Don Stewart
High Arctic	Ludy Pudluk; 183 (54.3%)	Frank Pearce; 154 (45.7%)					Ludy Pudluk
Hudson Bay	Moses Appaqaq; 48 (29.1%)	Johnny Tookalook; 37 (22.4%)	Joe Arragutainaq; 32 (19.4%)	Zack Novalinga; 18 (10.9%)	Johnny Kookie; 16 (9.7%)	George Emikotailuk; 14 (8.5%)	Moses Appaqaq
Inuvik	Tom Butters; 596 (64.1%)	Rose Marie Karnes; 199 (21.4%)	Cece McCauley; 135 (14.5%)				Tom Butters
Iqaluit	Dennis Patterson*; 575 (71.8%)	Ben Ell; 139 (17.4%)	Abe Okpik; 87 (10.9%)				new district
Kitikmeot East	Michael Angottitauruq; 319 (66.5%)	Steve Alookee; 161 (33.5%)					new district
Kitikmeot West	Red Pedersen; 322 (43.3%)	Bill Lyall; 225 (30.3%)	Malcolm MacPahil; 111 (14.9%)	Wilfrid MacDonald; 85 (11.4%)			new district
Kivallivik	Gordon Wray*; 543 (62.2%)	Peter Kritaqliluk; 259 (29.8%)	James Karetak; 71 (8.1%)				new district
Mackenzie Delta	Richard Nerysoo; 339 (65.7%)	Ernest Firth; 177 (34.3%)					Richard Nerysoo
Nunakput	Nellie Cournoyea* acclaimed						new district
Pine Point	Bruce McLaughlin; 421 (76.1%)	Clifford Reid; 132 (23.9%)					Bruce McLaughlin
Rae-Lac La Martre	James Wah-Shee acclaimed						James Wah-Shee
Sahtu	John T'Seleie; 312 (60.5%)	Peter Fraser*; 204 (39.5%)					new district
Slave River	Arnold McCallum; 665 (53.0%)	James Heron; 591 (47.0%)					Arnold McCallum
Tu Nedhe	Eliza Lawrence; 176 (52.5%)	Robert Sayine*; 99 (29.6%)	Florence Catholique; 60 (17.9%)				new district
Yellowknife Centre	Bob MacQuarrie; 590 (67.1%)	Terry Daniels; 290 (32.9%)					Bob MacQuarrie
Yellowknife North	Michael Ballantyne; 409 (47.0%)	Glenn Warner; 394 (45.3%)	Kit Spence; 61 (7.0%)	R. B. Fells; 6 (0.7%)			George Braden
Yellowknife South	Lynda Sorenson; 1,241 (76.6%)	Dan Prima; 378 (23.4%)					Lynda Sorsenson

* - denotes an incumbent running in a new district
