= 7th Northwest Territories Legislative Council =

7th Legislative Council

Type
- Type: Unicameral

History
- Established: 1970
- Disbanded: 1975
- Preceded by: 6th Northwest Territories Legislative Council
- Succeeded by: 8th Northwest Territories Legislative Assembly
- Seats: 14

Elections
- Last election: 1970

Meeting place
- Yellowknife

The 7th Northwest Territories Legislative Council was the 14th assembly of the territorial government. The council lasted from 1970 to 1975 and was the last council to have appointed members.

This was the first council to include a female member (Lena Pedersen).

== Membership ==
District / position	Member	First Appointed / First elected / Previously elected	No. of terms
Appointed Member	Hugh Campbell	1964	3rd term
Appointed Member	Louis-Edmond Hamelin	1970	1st term
Central Arctic	Lena Pedersen	1970	1st term
Eastern Arctic	Bryan Pearson	1970	1st term
Great Slave North	James Rabesca	1970	1st term
Great Slave South	Paul Kaeser	1962, 1970	2nd term*
High Arctic	Welland Phipps	1970	1st term
Keewatin South	Willie Adams	1970	1st term
Keewatin North	David Searle	1967	2nd term
Lower Mackenzie	Lyle Trimble	1964	3rd term
Mackenzie-Laird	Nick Sibbeston	1970	1st term
Western Arctic	Tom Butters	1970	1st term
