= 1987 Northwest Territories general election =

The 1987 Northwest Territories general election was held on October 5, 1987.

This was the last election in which Elections Canada would administer the elections.

== Election results ==
The election was held in 24 constituencies with 15,901 ballots cast, a turnout of 71.56%.

Outgoing Premier Nick Sibbeston ran for re-election but was replaced by Dennis Patterson who served out the entire term.

=== Election summary ===
Re-election Statistics
1983	1987	Did not run again	Defeated	Reelected
24	24	4	6	14

=== Candidates ===
Results by District
District	Winner	Second	Third	Fourth	Fifth	Sixth	Incumbent
Aivilik	Piita Irniq; 535 (52.7%)	Tagak Curley; 480 (47.3%)					Tagak Curley
Amittuq (formerly Foxe Basin)	Titus Allooloo; 331 (47.3%)	Elijah Erkloo; 131 (18.7%)	James Arvaluk; 130 (18.6%)	Lucien Ukkalianuk; 72 (10.3%)	Seeana Attagootak; 46 (6.6%)	Thomas Ootook; 10 (1.4%)	Elijah Erkloo
Baffin Central	Ipeelee Kilabuk; 252 (41.9%)	Stevie Audlakiak; 187 (31.1%)	Pauloosie Paniloo; 155 (25.8%)	Alan Kuniliusie; 7 (1.2%)			Pauloosie Paniloo
Baffin South	Joe Arlooktoo; 132 (34.0%)	Kenoayoak Pudlat; 122 (31.4%)	Joanasie Salomonie; 120 (30.9%)	Saila Pudlat; 14 (3.6%)			Joe Arlooktoo
Deh Cho	Samuel Gargan; 246 (53.1%)	Roy Fabien; 174 (37.6%)	Albert Canadien; 43 (9.3%)				Samuel Gargan
Hay River	John Pollard; 899 (58.8%)	Don Stewart; 631 (41.2%)					Don Stewart
High Arctic	Ludy Pudluk; 153 (46.9%)	Harry Iyerak; 87 (26.7%)	David Kalluk; 86 (26.4%)				Ludy Pudluk
Hudson Bay	Charlie Crow; 96 (45.7%)	Moses Appaqaq; 46 (21.9%)	Moses Novalinga; 31 (14.8%)	Joe Arragutainaq; 21 (10.0%)	Johnny Tookalook; 16 (7.6%)		Moses Appaqaq
Inuvik	Tom Butters acclaimed						Tom Butters
Iqaluit	Dennis Patterson acclaimed						Dennis Patterson
Kitikmeot West	Red Pedersen; 609 (72.4%)	Randy Mulder; 232 (27.6%)					Red Pedersen
Kivallivik	Gordon Wray; 582 (58.3%)	Henry Ford; 270 (27.0%)	Tommy Owlijoot; 147 (14.7%)				Gordon Wray
Mackenzie Delta	Richard Nerysoo; 319 (53.1%)	Bertha Allen; 179 (29.8%)	John Banksland; 103 (17.1%)				Richard Nerysoo
Nahendeh (formerly Deh Cho Gah)	Nick Sibbeston; 651 (79.6%)	Jim Villeneuve; 167 (20.4%)					Nick Sibbeston
Natilikmiot (formerly Kitikimeot East)	Michael Angottitauruq; 176 (31.7%)	John Ningark; 156 (28.1%)	Bill Lyall; 130 (23.4%)	Bobby Lyall; 93 (16.8%)			Michael Angottitauruq
Nunakput	Nellie Cournoyea; 489 (70.0%)	Mary Carpenter-Lyons; 210 (30.0%)					Nellie Cournoyea
Pine Point	Bruce McLaughlin; 225 (76.3%)	Clifford Reid; 70 (23.7%)					Bruce McLaughlin
Rae-Lac La Martre	Henry Zoe; 332 (39.0%)	Richard Whitford; 322 (37.8%)	James Wah-Shee; 198 (23.2%)				James Wah-Shee
Sahtu	Stephen Kakfwi; 381 (53.0%)	George Cleary; 338 (47.0%)					John T'Seleie
Slave River	Jeannie Marie-Jewell; 463 (35.0%)	Wayne Cahill; 345 (26.1%)	Frieda Martselos; 340 (25.7%)	Michael Miltenberger; 124 (9.4%)	Louis Sebert; 52 (3.9%)		Arnold McCallum
Tu Nedhe	Don Morin; 260 (62.2%)	Eliza Lawrence; 158 (37.8%)					Eliza Lawrence
Yellowknife Centre	Brian Lewis; 304 (36.2%)	Don Sian; 270 (32.1%)	Noel Montagano; 196 (23.3%)	Joseph Lanzon; 70 (8.3%)			Bob MacQuarrie
Yellowknife North	Michael Ballantyne acclaimed						Michael Ballantyne
Yellowknife South	Ted Richard; 1,091 (69.5%)	Arlene Haché; 297 (18.9%)	Peter Fugisang; 182 (11.6%				Ted Richard
