= 1970 Northwest Territories general election =

The 1970 Northwest Territories general election took place on December 21, 1970. It took place during the centennial of the territory.

Among the festivities earlier in the year was an official visit by Queen Elizabeth II to open the first Arctic Winter games in Yellowknife. The world-famous Polar Bear licence plate was also unveiled.

The centenary election brought up a number of old issues that have been seen in many elections in the past 100 years, mainly the transfer of powers from the federal government to the territory, full self-government, and rights for natives.

This was the first election in which a woman, Lena Pedersen was elected to the Territorial Legislature. She was one of ten elected members and four appointed members who would sit on the council.

The voting age for this election was lowered from 21 to 19.

== Election summary ==
Election summary	# of candidates		Popular vote	
Election summary	Incumbent	New	#	%
Elected candidates	2	7	?	?
Acclaimed candidates	?	1		
Appointed Members	1	3?		
Defeated candidates				
Total			9,169	100%
Turnout 69.2%

== Appointed members ==
7th Northwest Territories Council
Member	New/Re-appointed
Hugh Campbell	Re-appointed
Louis-Edmond Hamelin	New appointed
?	?
?	?

== Members of the Legislative Assembly elected ==
For complete electoral history, see individual districts

7th Northwest Territories Legislative Council
District	Member
Central Arctic	Lena Pedersen
Eastern Arctic	Bryan Pearson
Great Slave North	James Rabesca*
Great Slave South	Paul Kaeser
High Arctic	Welland Phipps
Keewatin South	Willie Adams
Keewatin North	David Searle
Lower Mackenzie	Lyle Trimble
Mackenzie-Laird	Nick Sibbeston
Western Arctic	Tom Butters

Preceded by 1967 Northwest Territories Election	Northwest Territories Elections	Succeeded by 1975 Northwest Territories Election
