= 1991 Northwest Territories general election =

The 1991 Northwest Territories general election was held on October 15, 1991.

== Election results ==
The election was held in 24 constituencies with 16,068 ballots cast, a turnout of 76.25%.

Outgoing Premier Dennis Patterson ran for re-election but was replaced by Nellie Cournoyea, who served out the entire term as the territory's first female Premier.

=== Election summary ===
Re-election Statistics
1987	1991	Did not run again	Defeated	Reelected
24	24	4	5	15

=== Candidates ===
Results by District
District	Winner	Second	Third	Fourth	Fifth	Sixth	Seventh	Eighth	Ninth	Incumbent
Aivilik	James Arvaluk; 185 (34.6%)	Piita Irniq; 100 (18.7%)	Andre Tautu; 97 (18.2%)	Donat Milortok; 94 (17.6%)	Tongola Sandy; 58 (10.9%)					Piita Irniq
Amittuq	Titus Allooloo; 411 (47.1%)	Lucassi Ivvalu; 237 (27.2%)	Enoki Iqittuq; 224 (25.7%)							Titus Allooloo
Baffin Central	Rebecca Mike; 197 (26.3%)	Pauloosie Paniloo; 110 (14.7%)	Ipeelee Kilabuk; 103 (13.8%)	Lootie Toomasie; 98 (13.1%)	Norman Komoartok; 88 (11.4%)	Myna Maniapik; 85 (11.4%)	Peter Iqalukjuak; 38 (5.1%)	Sam Palituq; 29 (3.9%)		Ipeelee Kilabuk
Baffin South	Kenoayoak Pudlat; 119 (19.2%)	Joe Arlooktoo; 100 (16.1%)	Padluq Melia; 96 (15.5%)	Johnny Cookie; 84 (13.5%)	J. Aragutina; 66 (10.6%)	Matthew Saveakjuk; 65 (10.5%)	Joannie Ikkadluak; 37 (6.0%)	Pudloo Mingeriak; 30 (4.8%)	Mikidjuk Kolola; 24 (3.9%)	Joe Arlooktoo
Deh Cho	Samuel Gargan acclaimed									Samuel Gargan
Hay River	John Pollard acclaimed									John Pollard
High Arctic	Ludy Pudluk; 146 (38.5%)	Larry Audlaluk; 94 (24.8%)	David Kalluk; 65 (17.2%)	Moses Koonoo; 52 (13.7%)	Jobie Issigaitok; 22 (5.8%)					Ludy Pudluk
Inuvik	Fred Koe; 335 (32.2%)	Glenna Hansen; 205 (19.7%)	George Doolittle; 179 (17.2%)	Cece McCauley; 149 (14.3%)	Jeff Gardiner; 137 (13.2%)	Vivian Hunter; 34 (3.3%)				Tom Butters
Iqaluit	Dennis Patterson; 866 (60.1%)	Val Haas; 405 (28.1%)	Bryan Sedluk Pearson; 169 (11.7%)							Dennis Patterson
Keewatin Central	John Todd; 573 (63.0%)	Jose Kusugak; 337 (37.0%)								new district
Kitikmeot	Ernie Bernhardt; 367 (33.0%)	Kelvin Ng; 316 (28.4%)	Joe Ohokannoak; 274 (24.7%)	Edna Elias; 137 (12.3%)	Allen Maghagak; 17 (1.5%)					Red Pedersen
Kivallivik	Silas Arngna'naaq; 424 (39.6%)	David Alagalak; 349 (32.6%)	Gordon Wray; 298 (27.8%)							Gordon Wray
Mackenzie Delta	Richard Nerysoo; 407 (55.5%)	Roger Allen; 326 (44.5%)								Richard Nerysoo
Nahendeh	Jim Antoine; 488 (50.5%)	Steve Malesku; 160 (16.6%)	Pat Scott; 117 (12.1%)	Arnold Hope; 58 (6.0%)	Bill Lafferty; 50 (5.2%)	Joe Germain Mercredi; 41 (4.2%)	Bertha Norwegian; 38 (3.9%)	Daniel Lapierre; 14 (1.5%)		Nick Sibbeston
Natilikmiot	John Ningark acclaimed									John Ningark
North Slave	Henry Zoe*; 352 (34.7%)	Joe Rabesca; 326 (32.1%)	Richard Whitford; 253 (24.9%)	Cecilia Wetrade; 84 (8.3%)						new district
Nunakput	Nellie Cournoyea acclaimed									Nellie Cournoyea
Sahtu	Stephen Kakfwi acclaimed									Stephen Kakfwi
Thebacha	Jeannie Marie-Jewell*; 708 (61.4%)	Louis Sebert; 445 (38.6%)								new district
Tu Nedhe	Don Morin; 401 (88.3%)	Barbara Ann Beck; 53 (11.7%)								Don Morin
Yellowknife Centre	Brian Lewis; 285 (31.5%)	Bruce McLaughlin*; 262 (29.0%)	Fernand Denault; 187 (20.7%)	Barbara O'Neill; 155 (17.2%)	June Balsillie; 15 (1.7%)					Brian Lewis
Yellowknife-Frame Lake	Charlie Dent; 313 (46.8%)	Arlene Hache; 214 (32.0%)	Noel Montagano; 132 (19.7%)	David Barry; 10 (1.5%)						new district
Yellowknife North	Michael Ballantyne; 677 (51.2%)	Barry Conacher; 646 (48.8%)								Michael Ballantyne
Yellowknife South	Tony Whitford acclaimed									Tony Whitford

* - denotes an incumbent running in a new district
