= Keewatin (electoral district) =

Former territorial electoral district in the Northwest Territories, Canada

Keewatin was a territorial electoral district representing most hamlets in the Keewatin Region. The only hamlets not included in the Keewatin electoral district were Coral Harbour and Repulse Bay (Naujaat), which were in the Foxe Basin electoral district.

The Keewatin electoral district was short-lived. It was created in 1975 and only lasted one election cycle before being dissolved in 1979 with the district being redistributed into Keewatin North and Keewatin South.

== Members of the Legislative Assembly (MLAs) ==
Name	Elected	Left Office
District created
Piita Irniq	1975	1979
District dissolved into Keewatin North and Keewatin South

== Election results ==
=== 1975 election ===
1975 Northwest Territories general election
Candidate	Votes	%
Piita Irniq	367	43.02%
Charlie Crow	311	36.46%
Garry Smith	175	20.52%
Total valid ballots / Turnout	853	71.89%
Rejected ballots	9	
Source(s) "Report of the Chief Electoral Officer on Federal By-Elections, By-Elections to the Council of the Yukon Territory, and Northwest Territories Council General Elections held in 1975" (PDF). Information Canada. 1976.

== See also ==
- List of Northwest Territories territorial electoral districts
- List of Nunavut territorial electoral districts
