= Speaker of the Legislative Assembly of the Northwest Territories =

Canadian territorial legislative officer

The Speaker is the presiding officer of the Legislative Assembly of the Northwest Territories. The speakership has changed many times: from 1876 to 1888 the presiding officer of the assembly was the Lieutenant-Governor of the North-West Territories (with North-West hyphenated name used until 1906); however, Members of the Legislative Assembly would also elect one of their own to act as chairman. Elected members held the Speakership from 1888 until 1905. The Deputy Commissioner of the Territories became Speaker and held that role from 1921 until 1975, when it was returned to the elected members.

== Speakers and presiding officers ==
=== Lieutenant-governors serving as presiding officer of the Council of the North-West Territories (1876–1888) ===
- David Laird October 7, 1876 – December 3, 1881
- Edgar Dewdney December 3, 1881 – July 1, 1888

=== Speakers of the North-West Legislative Assembly (1888–1905) ===
- Herbert Charles Wilson 1888–1891
- James Hamilton Ross 1891–1894
- John Betts 1894–1898
- William Eakin 1898–1902
- Archibald Gillis 1902–1905

=== Deputy Commissioners serving as presiding officer of the 2nd Council of the Northwest Territories (1921–1975) ===
- Roy A. Gibson June 16, 1921 – October 3, 1950
- Frank J. G. Cunningham June 26, 1951 – April 10, 1957
- Wilfred G. Brown April 10, 1957 – July 23, 1965
- Stuart Milton Hodgson August 1, 1965 – March 1, 1967
- John Havelock Parker March 2, 1967 – April 30, 1975 (continued as Deputy Commissioner until April 14, 1979)

=== Speakers of the Legislative Assembly of the Northwest Territories (since 1975) ===
- David Searle May 1, 1975 – November 13, 1979
- Robert H. MacQuarrie November 13, 1979 – October 22, 1980
- Donald Morton Stewart October 22, 1980 – November 12, 1987
- Red Pedersen November 12, 1987 – October 18, 1989
- Richard Nerysoo October 19, 1989 – November 13, 1991
- Michael Ballantyne November 13, 1991 – November 10, 1993
- Jeannie Marie-Jewell November 13, 1993 – December 15, 1994
- Brian Lewis (Acting) December 15, 1994 – February 15, 1995
- Samuel Gargan February 15, 1995 – January 18, 2000
- Tony Whitford January 19, 2000 – December 11, 2003
- David Krutko December 11, 2003 – June 1, 2004
- Paul Delorey June 1, 2004 – October 3, 2011
- Jackie Jacobson October 3, 2011 – November 23, 2015
- Jackson Lafferty December 16, 2015 – October 24, 2019
- Frederick Blake Jr October 24, 2019 – December 7, 2023
- Shane Thompson December 7, 2023 – present
Timeline of the divisions of Canada; size of the North-West/Northwest Territories changes throughout 1870 to 1999
