= 1979 Northwest Territories general election =

The 1979 Northwest Territories general election was held on October 1, 1979.

Twenty-two members were elected to the Northwest Territories Legislative Assembly. In 1980, George Braden was named "Government Leader", the first democratic leader of the Northwest Territories since Frederick Haultain in 1905 and the first of its modern boundaries. In 1994, he was retroactively given the title Premier of the Northwest Territories.

== Election summary ==
Election summary	# of candidates		Popular vote	
Election summary	Incumbent	New	#	%
Elected candidates	4	17	?	?
Acclaimed candidates	?	1		
Defeated candidates				
Total			12,586	100%
Turnout 62.1%

== Members of the Legislative Assembly elected ==
For complete electoral history, see individual districts

9th Northwest Territories Legislative Assembly
District	Member
Baffin Central	James Arreak
Baffin South	Joe Arlooktoo
Central Arctic	Kane Tologanak
Foxe Basin	Mark Evaloarjuk
Frobisher Bay	Dennis Patterson
Great Slave East	Robert Sayine
Hay River	Donald Morton Stewart
High Arctic	Ludy Pudluk
Hudson Bay	Moses Appaqaq
Inuvik	Tom Butters
Keewatin North	William Noah
Keewatin South	Tagak Curley
Mackenzie Delta	Richard Nerysoo
Mackenzie Great Bear	Peter Fraser
Mackenzie-Laird	Nick Sibbeston
Pine Point	Bruce McLaughlin
Rae-Lac La Martre	James Wah-Shee
Slave River	Arnold McCallum
Western Arctic	Nellie Cournoyea
Yellowknife Centre	Robert H. MacQuarrie
Yellowknife North	George Braden
Yellowknife South	Lynda Sorenson
