= Inuit Land Use and Occupation Project =

Inuit Land Use and Occupation Project (ILUOP) was a series of studies to record Inuit land use and occupancy in the Canadian north, initiated by the Inuit Tapiriit Kanatami (ITK) in 1973 and funded by Indigenous and Northern Affairs Canada. The final three-volume report, edited by Milton Freeman Research Limited, was published in 1976. The project provided a foundational basis for the Nunavut land claim, documenting Inuit use and occupancy of an area exceeding 2.8 million square kilometres. It also established the "map biography" methodology that became a standard approach for land use and occupancy studies across Canada.

The ILUOP emerged from political pressures building across the western Arctic as oil and gas exploration opened up the Mackenzie Delta in the late 1960s and early 1970s. The Committee of Original Peoples Entitlement (COPE), headquartered in Inuvik, united Inuvialuit, Dene, Métis and non-Indigenous trappers in resistance to large-scale industrial development that treated the region as uninhabited wilderness. From 1971, under the political leadership of COPE President Nellie Cournoyea, the organization proposed creating maps to document the extent of hunting and trapping across the region. Canadian geographer Peter Usher worked with COPE on the initial design of this mapping approach, making the ILUOP the first large-scale cultural mapping project of its kind.
