= Mackenzie Great Bear =

Canadian electoral district

Mackenzie Great Bear was an electoral district of the Northwest Territories, Canada. The district consisted of communities in the Sahtu Region (Colville Lake, Fort Good Hope, Fort Norman (Tulita), Fort Franklin (Délı̨nę) and Norman Wells), Wrigley plus mining areas in Port Radium (Eldorado Mine) and Sawmill Bay (Terra Mines). In 1979, Wrigley was moved from this district to the Mackenzie-Laird district.

== Members of the Legislative Assembly (MLAs) ==
| Name | Elected | Left Office |
District created
| George Barnaby | 1975 | 1976 |
| Peter C. Fraser | 1976 | 1983 |
District dissolved into Sahtu

== Election results ==
=== 1979 election ===
1979 Northwest Territories general election
| Candidate | Votes | % |
|---|---|---|
| Peter C. Fraser | 201 | 38.95% |
| John Tutcho | 168 | 32.56% |
| Frankie T'selehye | 147 | 28.49% |
| Total valid ballots / Turnout | 536 | 70.05% |
| Rejected ballots | 2 | |
Source(s) "REPORT OF THE CHIEF ELECTORAL OFFICER ON THE GENERAL ELECTION OF MEMBERS TO THE COUNCIL OF THE NORTHWEST TERRITORIES 1979" (PDF). Elections NWT. January 1980.

=== 1976 by-election ===
A by-election was required after George Barnaby along with James Wah-Shee resigned their seats in protest of the Northwest Territories government ignoring Dene issues.

Northwest Territories territorial by-election, {{{2}}} Resignation of George Barnaby
| Candidate | Votes | % |
|---|---|---|
| Peter C. Fraser | 297 | 57.89% |
| Claire Barnabe | 215 | 41.91% |
| Total valid ballots / Turnout | 512 | 54.98% |
| Rejected ballots | 12 | |
Source(s) "REPORT OF THE CHIEF ELECTORAL OFFICER ON THE FEDERAL BY-ELECTIONS AND BY-ELECTIONS TO THE COUNCIL OF THE NORTHWEST TERRITORIES HELD IN 1976" (PDF). Minister of Supply and Services Canada. 1977.

=== 1975 election ===
1975 Northwest Territories general election
| Candidate | Votes | % |
|---|---|---|
| George Barnaby | 269 | 45.59% |
| Claire Barnabe | 255 | 43.22% |
| Al Wilson | 66 | 11.19% |
| Total valid ballots / Turnout | 590 | 68.70% |
| Rejected ballots | 18 | |
Source(s) "REPORT OF THE CHIEF ELECTORAL OFFICER ON FEDERAL BY-ELECTIONS, BY-ELECTIONS TO THE COUNCIL OF THE YUKON TERRITORY, AND NORTHWEST TERRITORIES COUNCIL GENERAL ELECTIONS HELD IN 1975" (PDF). Information Canada. 1976.

== See also ==
- List of Northwest Territories territorial electoral districts
