= Frobisher Bay (territorial electoral district) =

Electoral district in the Northwest Territories, Canada

Frobisher Bay was an electoral district of the Northwest Territories, Canada. The district consisted of Frobisher Bay (Iqaluit), Allen Island, and Brevoort Island.

== Members of the Legislative Assembly (MLAs) ==
Name	Elected	Left Office
Dennis Patterson	1979	1983

== Election results ==
=== 1979 election ===
1979 Northwest Territories general election: Frobisher Bay
Candidate	Votes	%
Dennis Patterson	292	49.33%
Ben Ell	209	35.30%
Bryan Pearson	91	15.37%
Total valid ballots / Turnout	592	74.50%
Rejected ballots	4	
Source(s) "REPORT OF THE CHIEF ELECTORAL OFFICER ON THE GENERAL ELECTION OF MEMBERS TO THE COUNCIL OF THE NORTHWEST TERRITORIES 1979" (PDF). Elections NWT. January 1980.

== See also ==
- List of Northwest Territories territorial electoral districts
- List of Nunavut territorial electoral districts
