= Welland Phipps =

Canadian politician

Welland Phipps

Welland Wilfred Phipps (July 23, 1922 – October 22, 1996), nicknamed Weldy and Angayuroluk, was a Canadian military pilot and prisoner of war during World War II, a pioneer bush pilot, inventor and a territorial level politician.

== World War II ==
Phipps joined the Royal Canadian Air Force and became a fighter pilot in World War II. He was shot down and became a Prisoner of War for 2 years. He succeeded in making an escape from his POW Camp.

== Aviation ==
Phipps moved to the Northwest Territories after returning home from the war. In 1953 and founded a business called Atlas Aviation, based in Resolute Bay. He invented a new type of balloon tundra tire that allows an aircraft to land safely on tundra. The type of tire is known as the Weldy Special. Atlas Aviation introduced the first regular scheduled airline service to Canada's most northern communities.

Phipps introduced the first scheduled airline service to the communities of Resolute Bay, Grise Fiord, Arctic Bay, and Pond Inlet. Their citizens have special memories of him. The Inuit named him "Angayuroluk", an affectionate nickname roughly translated as "poor older brother". He was fortunate enough to obtain the registration CF-WWP (his initials) for one of his first Twin Otters.

On April 5, 1971, his wife, Frances Phipps, was recognized by the Guinness Book of World Records as the first woman to set foot on the North Pole, when she accompanied him on a flight to install a navigation beacon.

Phipps delivered supplies to a number of notable arctic expeditions, including Ralph Plaisted in 1967 and 1968. He retired from his aviation career in 1972. The Canadian aviation community recognized Phipps many achievements in aviation. He has earned him numerous recognitions, including the Member of the Order of Canada the Canadian Order of Flight, Yukon Territory Order of Polaris as well as being inducted to the Canadian Aviation Hall of Fame. In 1961, he was awarded the Trans-Canada Trophy (Mckee) for his work perfecting the balloon tires.

== Political career ==
Phipps first ran in the by-election for the Eastern Arctic district in the Northwest Territories Legislature in 1966 but was defeated by Simonie Michael. He was later elected to the Northwest Territories Legislature to the High Arctic electoral district in the 1970 Northwest Territories general election. He served a single term in office before retiring in 1975.

== Awards ==
- 19?? – Order of Polaris
- 1961 – Trans-Canada McKee Trophy
- 1973 – Canadian Aviation Hall of Fame
- 1976 – Order of Canada (Member)

Legislative Assembly of the Northwest Territories
Preceded by New District	MLA High Arctic; 1970–1975	Succeeded by Ludy Pudluk
