= Charlie Crow =

Canadian politician

Charlie Crow (born: Richmond Gulf, Quebec) is a former disc jockey and Member of the Northwest Territories Legislative Assembly from 1987 to 1991.

== Early life ==
Crow became the first disc jockey for community radio station CKSN-FM when it opened in 1971. He worked on the radio for four years.

== Politics ==
Crow first ran for a seat in the 1975 Northwest Territories general election but was defeated by Peter Irniq, who won the Keewatin electoral district in a three-way race. Following his defeat he became involved in local politics for a number of years.

Crow ran for a seat in the Northwest Territories Legislature for the second time in the 1987 Northwest Territories general election. He won the Hudson Bay electoral district defeating incumbent MLA Moses Appaqaq. He became the first blind lawmaker in Northwest Territories history. He served until 1991.

Crow became the first blind legislator in Northwest Territories history. The legislature computers were upgraded to accommodate Crow with special computer software and printers capable of producing Braille documents.

Legislative Assembly of the Northwest Territories
Preceded by Moses Appaqaq	MLA Hudson Bay; 1987-1991	Succeeded by District Abolished
