= Willie Adams (politician) =

Canadian Inuk politician

The Honourable Willie Adams
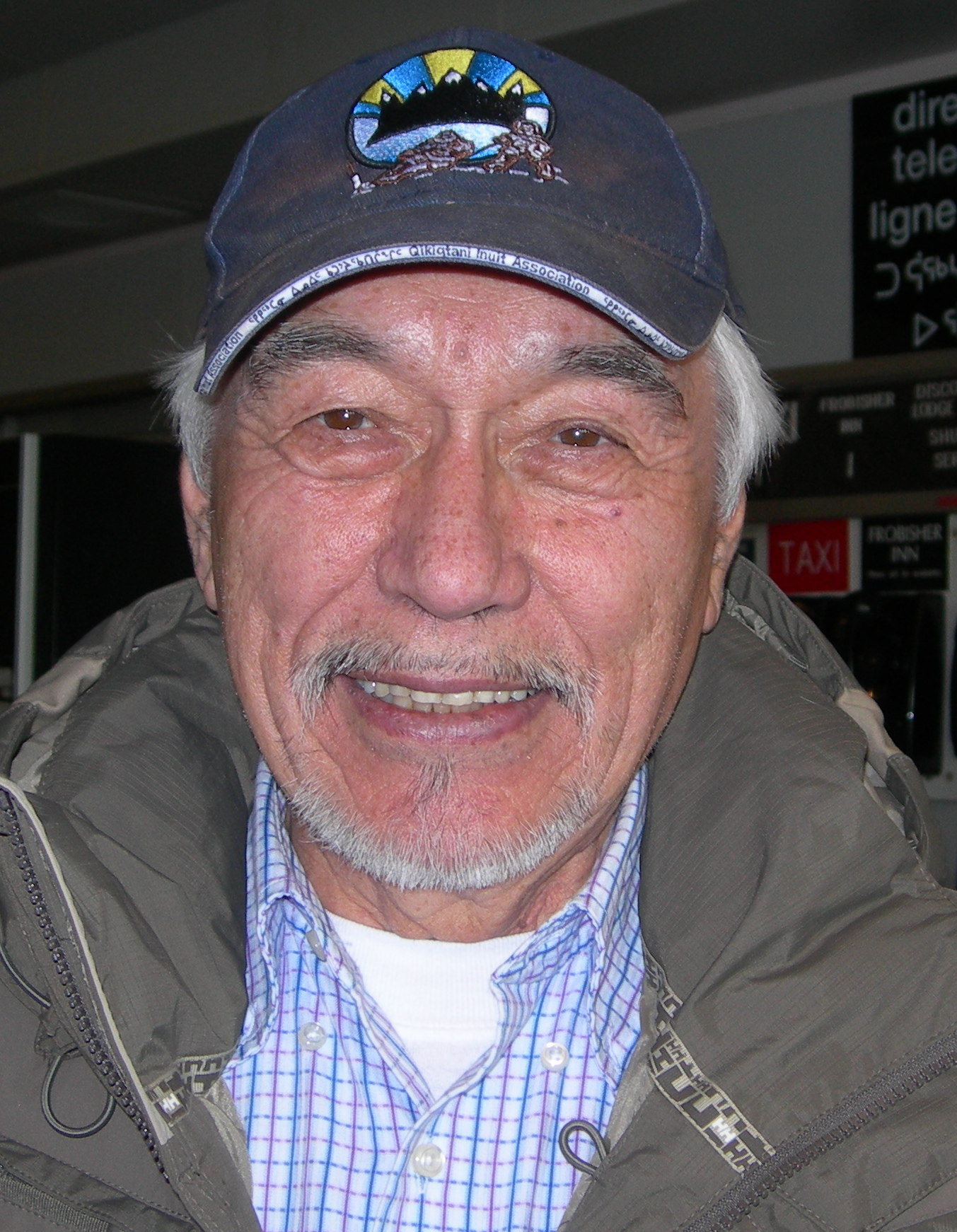
- Adams in 2008

Member of the Senate of Canada
- In office April 5, 1977 – June 22, 2009
- Nominated by: Pierre Trudeau
- Appointed by: Jules Léger
- Constituency: Nunavut (1999–2009); Northwest Territories (1977–1999)

MLA for Keewatin South
- In office 1970–1975

Personal details
- Born: June 22, 1934 (age 92) Fort Chimo, Northwest Territories
- Party: Liberal
- Spouse: Mary
- Children: 1
- Profession: Electrician; businessman

Willie Adams (born June 22, 1934) is a Canadian Inuk politician who was a member of the Senate of Canada from 1977 to 2009.

== Biography ==
Adams was born in Fort Chimo (now Kuujjuaq), Nunavik's largest northern village (Inuit community). Educated at Northern Quebec mission schools, Adams became an electrician, and eventually owned a number of businesses in different industries around Canada.

Adams served for two terms as the chairman of the Rankin Inlet hamlet council. In 1970 he was elected a member of the Northwest Territories Territorial Council (now the Legislative Assembly of the Northwest Territories), serving as the representative of Keewatin South until 1975.

In spring 1977, Pierre Trudeau, the then Prime Minister of Canada, decided that an Inuk should be appointed to the Senate and dispatched Warren Allmand, the Minister for Northern Affairs, to interview potential candidates. Adams was not excited about joining the Senate upon being asked by Allmand - in fact, he joked that he did not even know what the Senate was, asking the Minister, "What's the Senate?" However, upon being advised of a Senator's annual salary of approximately C$60,000, far more than Adams' electrician's pay of $7,500 a year, he seized the opportunity. Adams was appointed as a Senator for the Northwest Territories by Jules Léger, the then Governor General of Canada, on the advice of the Prime Minister on April 5, 1977, and sat as a member of the Liberal Party.

Adams took an intense interest in the Nunavut Land Claims Agreement, and upon the creation of the territory of Nunavut in 1999 became a Senator for that territory.

In 2009, he left the Senate upon reaching the mandatory retirement age of 75. At that time, he was the longest-serving current member of the Canadian Senate, and had served over 32 years in Parliament without ever having faced an election campaign, as Canadian Senators are appointed by the Governor General on the advice of the Prime Minister, not elected.

== Business ventures ==
By 1997, Adams had founded several businesses, including Kudlik Electric Ltd., Kudlik Construction Ltd., Rankin Inlet's Nanuq Inn and Ottawa's Umingmak Expediting Ltd. Adams is also president of Polar Bear Cave Investments, a company that owned the Nanuq Inn until its closure in 2003.

== Personal life ==
Adams married his wife, Mary, in the late 1970s. The pair met when the latter travelled to the Northwest Territories to find work as a home economist. The couple have a son, Isaac. He was appointed as an Officer of the Order of Canada in 2023. He currently resides in Kemptville, Ontario.

Legislative Assembly of the Northwest Territories
Preceded by New District	MLA Keewatin South; 1970–1975	Succeeded by District Abolished
Parliament of Canada
Preceded by Thomas Davis; James Alexander Lougheed; William Dell Perley; James Hamilton Ross	Senator Northwest Territories; 1977–1999	Succeeded by Nick Sibbeston
Preceded by New position	Senator Nunavut; 1999–2009	Succeeded by Dennis Patterson
