= Daniel L. Norris =

Canadian politician (1935–2008)

Commissioner of the Northwest Territories
- In office October 2, 1989 – September 30, 1994
- Prime Minister: Brian Mulroney; Kim Campbell; Jean Chrétien
- Premier: Dennis Patterson; Nellie Cournoyea
- Preceded by: John Havelock Parker
- Succeeded by: Helen Maksagak

Personal details
- Born: August 30, 1935 East Channel, near Inuvik, Northwest Territories, Canada
- Died: August 5, 2008 (aged 72) Edmonton, Alberta, Canada
- Spouse: Margaret
- Occupation: pilot, radio operator

Daniel L. Norris (August 30, 1935 – August 5, 2008) was the commissioner of the Northwest Territories from October 2, 1989, until September 30, 1994. Norris was born in 1935 near Inuvik and was raised in Aklavik. Norris died on August 5, 2008, from heart failure, a complication of his long-time struggle with diabetes.

== Biography ==
Norris was born on August 30, 1935 near Inuvik in the Mackenzie Delta. Raised in Aklavik, Norris reportedly aspired to become a trapper like his father. Norris served for 27 years in the Northwest Territories government's public service, including four years spent as a regional administrator in the Beaufort Delta. He began in the public sector in what was then the Department of Northern Affairs and National Resources, and rose within that department to become its regional superintendent of personnel.

On October 2, 1989, Norris was appointed as the territory's 11th commissioner, making him the first Aboriginal born in the north of Canada to be appointed to that role. Between his appointment in 1989 and his leaving his role on September 30, 1994, Norris was forced to set out new protocols for the role of the Commissioner, as the position had some legislative function up until three years prior to Norris taking up the job.

== Death ==
On August 5, 2008, Daniel Norris died in an Edmonton, Alberta hospital of heart failure, following a protracted struggle with diabetes. On August 7, Northwest Territories government buildings with flagpoles flew their flags at half-mast in memory of Norris, and on August 11, the day of his funeral, the same protocol was adopted.

== Arms ==
Coat of arms of Daniel L. Norris

Notes
Granted 22 July 1992.
Crest
Rising out of a coronet the rim Or set with maple leaves Gules and mountain aven flowers Proper a demi pine marten Or holding in its dexter paw a thistle and a shamrock Proper.
Escutcheon
Azure a pall and pale merged wavy Or voided wavy of the field cotised wavy Or.
Motto
Born To Soar

| Preceded by John Havelock Parker | Commissioner of the Northwest Territories; 1989–1994 | Succeeded by Helen Maksagak |
