= David Searle =

Canadian politician (1936–2021)

David Harry Searle CM QC (1936 – March 1, 2021) was a Canadian politician and lawyer from the Northwest Territories.

== Legal career ==
Born in Edmonton, Alberta, Searle moved to Yellowknife, Northwest Territories with his family in 1946. He was educated at the University of Alberta. Searle established his law practice in 1963 partnering with Justice Mark de Weerdt in Yellowknife. He practised law in the territory until 1981. He served as a crown attorney until his election in 1967. Searle moved to Vancouver and practised mining and environmental law with a firm called Davis & Company. He served as president of the Law Society of the Northwest Territories. From 1991 to 2004, he was a professor at the University of British Columbia Faculty of Law.

Searle was named to the Order of Canada in 1999 as a Member.

Searle retired in August 2006.

== Political career ==
Searle was elected to the Legislative Assembly of Northwest Territories in the 1967 Northwest Territories general election; he served the riding of Mackenzie North. In his first term in office he was at the press conference to unveil the current Northwest Territories flag on January 31, 1969.

He was re-elected to his second term in office for the new district of Keewatin North after redistribution for the 1970 Northwest Territories general election.

Searle ran for a third term in the 1975 Northwest Territories general election, this time in the new district of Yellowknife South after a much larger redistribution of the ridings. He was re-elected and on May 1, 1975 became the first elected Speaker of the Legislative Assembly since Archibald Beaton Gillis in 1905.

Searle ran in the 1979 Canadian federal election in Western Arctic as the Liberal candidate, finishing a close second to Dave Nickerson of the Progressive Conservatives.

1979 Canadian federal election: Northwest Territories
| Party | Candidate | Votes | % |
|---|---|---|---|
| Progressive Conservative | Dave Nickerson | 4,058 | 35.16 |
| Liberal | David Searle | 3,827 | 33.15 |
| New Democratic | Georges Erasmus | 3,385 | 29.33 |
| Independent | Edward McRae | 273 | 2.37 |
| Total valid votes | | 11,543 | 100.0 |
Riding created from part of the former riding of Northwest Territories, with New Democrat Wally Firth as the incumbent.

Legislative Assembly of the Northwest Territories
| Preceded by Peter Baker | MLA Mackenzie North; 1967–1970 | Succeeded by District Abolished |
| Preceded by New District | MLA Keewatin North; 1970–1975 | Succeeded by District Abolished |
| Preceded by New District | MLA Yellowknife South; 1975–1979 | Succeeded by Lynda Sorenson |
| Preceded by John Havelock Parker (as Deputy Commissioner) | Speaker of the Northwest Territories Assembly; 1975–1979 | Succeeded by Robert H. MacQuarrie |
