= Fred Koe =

Canadian politician (born 1947)

Fred Koe (born March 8, 1947) is a former territorial level politician and Member of the Legislative Assembly of the Northwest territories from 1991 to 1995. He was born in Aklavik.

Koe is the son of Jim Koe, who was the chief of the Aklavik Indian Band. He grew up in Aklavik and would later move to Inuvik. At the age of 11, he was a victim of the Canadian Indian residential school system, and was forced to go school in Inuvik, away from his family.

Koe ran for a seat in the Northwest Territories Legislature in the 1991 Northwest Territories general election. He won the Inuvik electoral district defeating future Commissioner Glenna Hansen. Koe was defeated one term later defending his incumbency. He was defeated by candidate Floyd Roland in the 1995 Northwest Territories general election.

After his defeat, Koe became president, Northwest Territories Development Corporation. He now lives in Whitehorse, Yukon where he is a member of the board of directors for the First Nations Bank of Canada and the Da Daghay Development Corporation.

Koe is the father of World champion curler Kevin Koe, as well as Jamie Koe and Kerry Koe-Galusha. Jamie and Kerry were born when the family was living in Yellowknife. Fred played with Jamie and Kerry at the 1999 Canadian Mixed Curling Championship.

Legislative Assembly of the Northwest Territories
Preceded by Tom Butters	MLA Inuvik; 1991-1995	Succeeded by Floyd Roland
