= Bryan Pearson (politician) =

Canadian politician

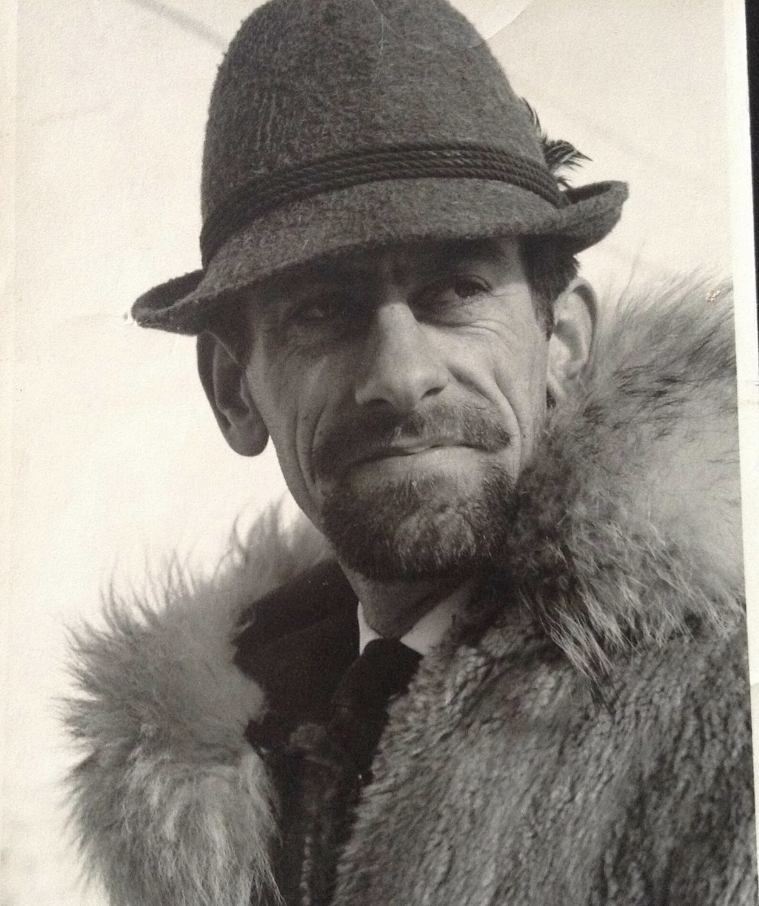

MLA for Eastern Arctic
- In office 1970–1975
- Preceded by: Simonie Michael
- Succeeded by: riding dissolved

MLA for Baffin South
- In office 1975–1979
- Preceded by: first member
- Succeeded by: Joe Arlooktoo

Personal details
- Born: 30 May 1934 Liverpool, England
- Died: 12 October 2016 (aged 82) Iqaluit, Nunavut, Canada

Bryan Pearson (30 May 1934 – 12 October 2016), nicknamed Sedluk or Salluk, meaning skinny in Inuktitut, was a territorial level politician from the Northwest Territories, in what is now Nunavut, Canada.

== Early life ==
Pearson was born in Liverpool, England 30 May 1934. He had two siblings, a brother - Robert and a sister - Val Pearson, who grew up in the Wirral Merseyside.

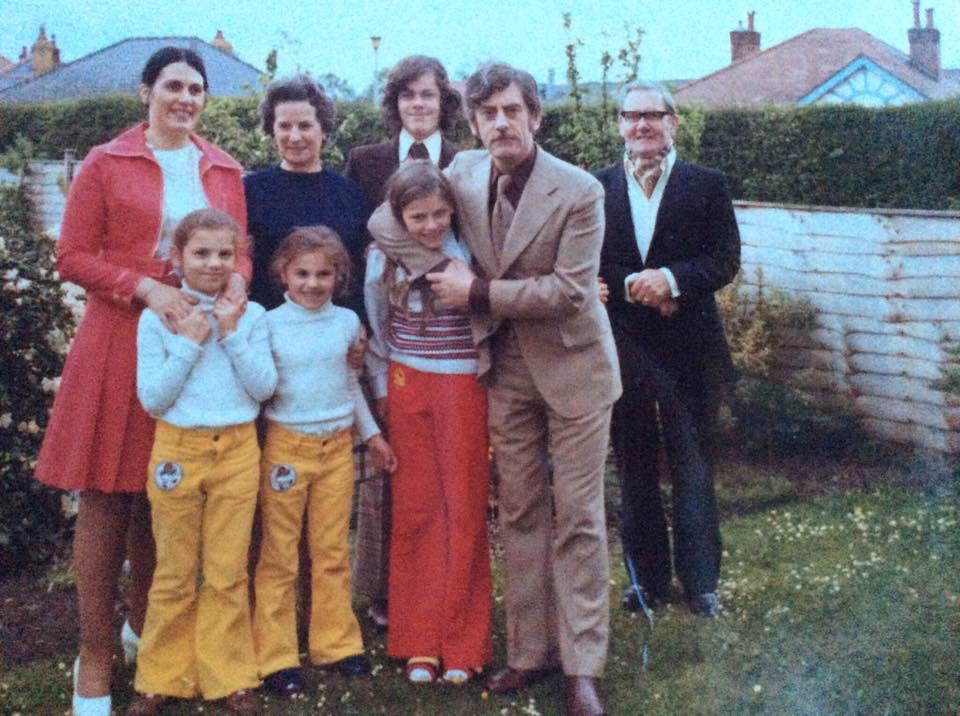
Younger Pearson back home in the Wirral with family

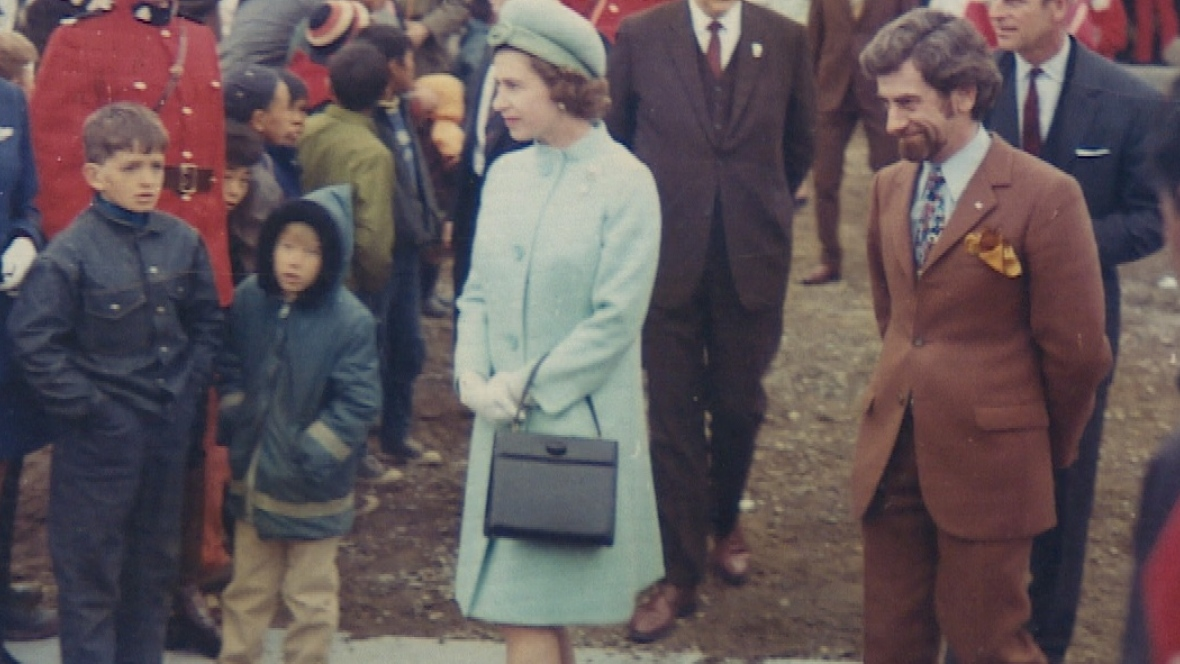
Bryan Pearson MLA and Queen Elizabeth after her trip to visit in Iqaluit

Pearson joined the Merchant Navy when he was about 15. After working on ships in Britain and Australia he came to Canada in 1956 and went to Baffin Island. He was hired to work at the Distant Early Warning Line site on Padloping Island in the kitchen. In 1957 he moved to Apex, an Inuit community about 5 km (3.1 mi) outside of Iqaluit, to work at the Frobisher Bay Air Base.

Beginning in the 1960s he began several businesses including the original taxi service, Astro Theatre (in 1994, the first, and as of 2016 the only cinema in Nunavut), Arctic Ventures (which he later sold to Kenn Harper). He also worked as the communities undertaker for many years and had a hearse shipped in.

== Political career ==
In 1964, a fire in Apex motivated Pearson and others to organise the first settlement council for the community and was elected as the chairperson. Pearson was first elected to the Northwest Territories Legislature in the 1970 Northwest Territories general election. He won the electoral district of Eastern Arctic and held that district until it was abolished in the 1975 redistribution. Pearson ran for re-election and won the new Baffin South electoral district in the 1975 Northwest Territories general election. He did not return after the legislature was dissolved in 1979 and he was defeated by Dennis Patterson in the new Frobisher Bay electoral district.

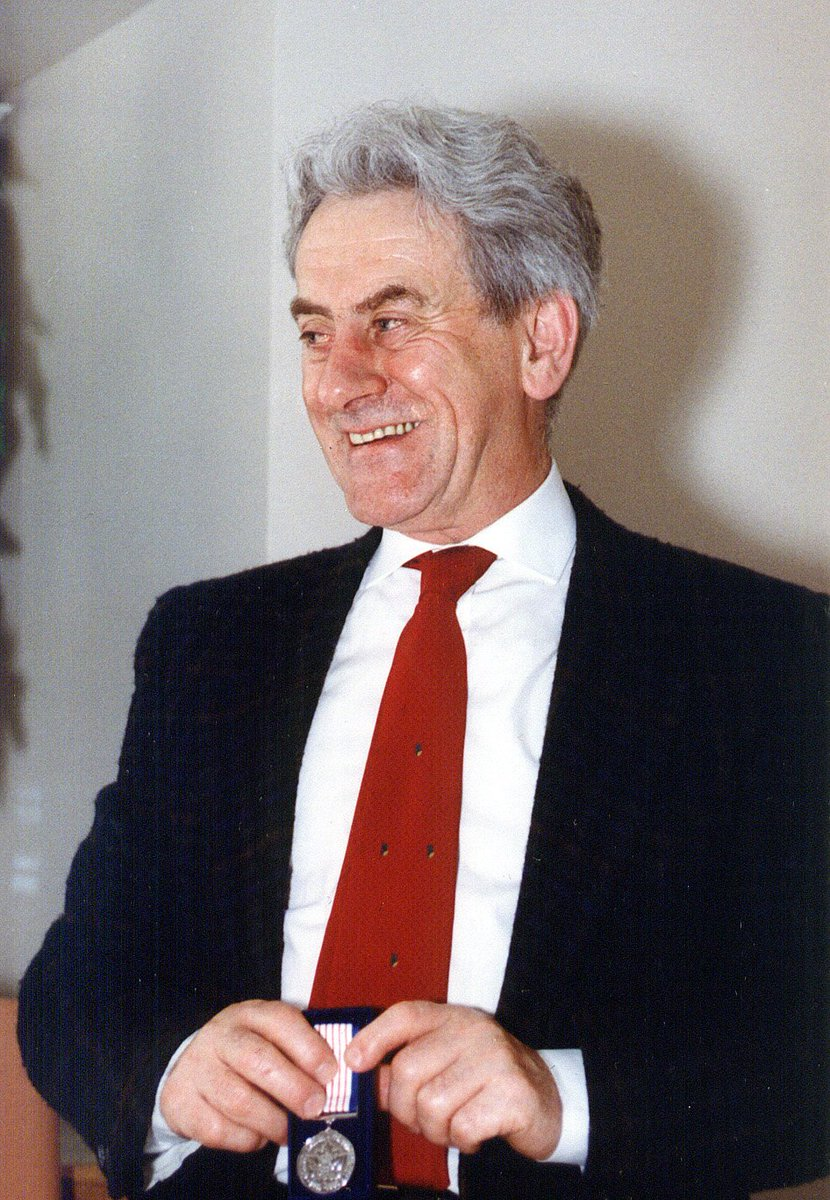
Bryan Pearson accepting award

In 1979, Pearson was elected as the first mayor of Iqaluit and served several terms until 1985.

Pearson attempted a political comeback in the 1991 Northwest Territories general election running in the Iqaluit electoral district. He was defeated in a three-way race by Dennis Patterson.

== Death ==
While on holiday in Australia he was diagnosed with pancreatic or liver cancer, which was confirmed on his return to Canada. He died at his home in Iqaluit on 12 October 2016. The town mourned his lost, Queen Elizabeth sent a letter of condolences and the Canadian territories hung the flag at half mast in Pearson's honour. A plaque remembering Pearson is to be opened in Liverpool Cathedral, one of Bryan's favourite places.
