= Great Slave East =

Great Slave East was an electoral district of the Northwest Territories, Canada. The district consisted of Fort Resolution.

== Members of the Legislative Assembly (MLAs) ==
| Name | Elected | Left Office |
| Robert Sayine | 1979 | 1983 |

== Election results ==
=== 1979 election ===
1979 Northwest Territories general election
| Candidate | Votes | % |
|---|---|---|
| Robert Sayine | Acclaimed | |
Source(s) "REPORT OF THE CHIEF ELECTORAL OFFICER ON THE GENERAL ELECTION OF MEMBERS TO THE COUNCIL OF THE NORTHWEST TERRITORIES" (PDF). Elections NWT. January 1980.

== See also ==
- List of Northwest Territories territorial electoral districts
