= Simonie Michael =

Canadian Inuk politician (1933–2008)

- ᓴᐃᒨᓂ ᒪᐃᑯᓪ
- Michael in 2002

Member of the Legislative Assembly of the Northwest Territories for Eastern Arctic
- In office September 19, 1966 – December 21, 1970
- Preceded by: District created
- Succeeded by: Bryan Pearson

Personal details
- Born: March 2, 1933 near Iqaluit, Northwest Territories, Canada
- Died: November 15, 2008 (aged 75) Iqaluit, Nunavut, Canada
- Profession: Carpenter

Simonie Michael (Inuktitut: ᓴᐃᒨᓂ ᒪᐃᑯᓪ; first name also spelled Simonee, alternative surnames Michel or E7-551; March 2, 1933 – November 15, 2008) was a Canadian politician from the eastern Northwest Territories (now Nunavut) who was the first Inuk elected to a legislature in Canada. Before becoming involved in politics, Michael worked as a carpenter and business owner, and was one of very few translators between Inuktitut and English. He became a prominent member of the Inuit co-operative housing movement and a community activist in Iqaluit, and was appointed to a series of governing bodies, including the precursor to the Iqaluit City Council.

After becoming the first elected Inuk member of the Northwest Territories Legislative Council, in 1966, Michael worked on infrastructural and public health initiatives. He is credited with bringing public attention to the dehumanizing effects of the disc number system that was used in place of surnames for Inuit, and with prompting the government to authorise Project Surname to replace the numbers with names.

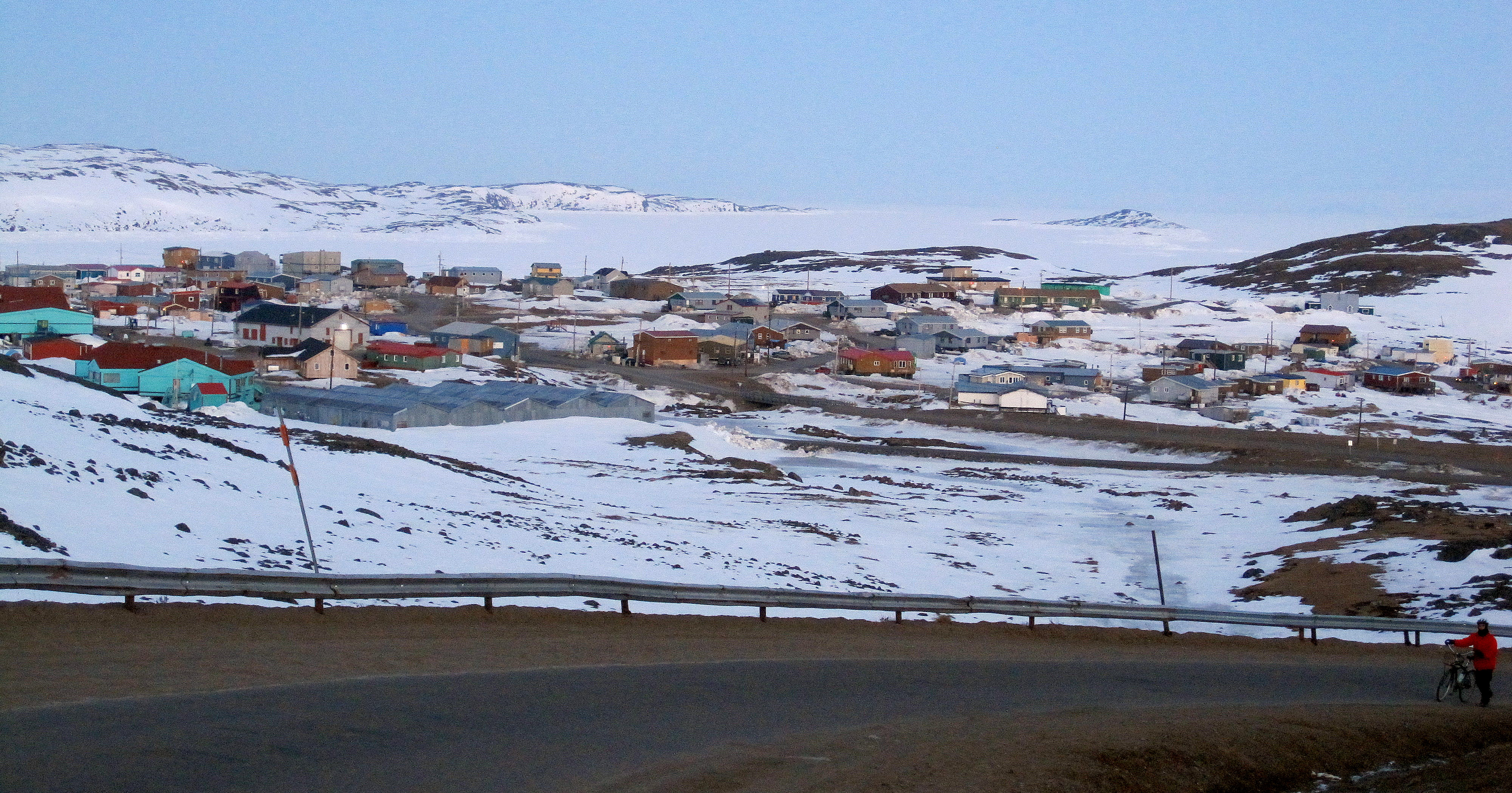
Michael was born near Apex, Iqaluit.

== Early life ==
Michael was born between Kimmirut (then Lake Harbour) and Iqaluit (then Frobisher Bay), and was described as being from Apex, Iqaluit. His step-father, Tigullagaq, worked for the Hudson's Bay Company. While Michael was a child during World War II, the United States Army Air Force constructed several air bases around Iqaluit, and employed him in a series of jobs: as a dish washer, cook, stock boy, quartermaster, and later a heavy equipment operator. The military airfield construction would lead to the development of the city of Iqaluit, but it left Michael with several negative impressions. He would later say that the American military did not provide compensation for much of the labour that Inuit workers performed, including three months of work transporting wood. He also recalled that when Inuit residents were relocated to a nearby island to make space for the military construction projects, no means of transportation were given for them to travel between the island and the mainland.

Despite the policy of racial separation enforced by the Royal Canadian Mounted Police in Iqaluit during the 1940s and into the 1950s, Michael was one of the residents who worked in various jobs for the American military, and he was able to learn English through that work. By the time he was 15 or 16 he had become noted for his skill as a translator. He has been described as the only Inuk in Iqaluit who could translate between Inuktitut and English in the mid-1950s, though some sources mention other translators around the same time. While working at the American military base, Michael became close friends with Joe Tikivik, who would later become his business partner.

Over the following years employees of the Canadian government working in and near Iqaluit sought out Michael because of his knowledge of English, so he had numerous early interactions with the Canadian government. Around the time that Michael began working as a government interpreter he also got married. At the start of the marriage he and his wife lived with her mother and father.

== Employment and activism ==
Before his election to the Northwest Territories Legislative Council at the age of 33, Michael worked as a carpenter, and ran a taxi and bus service. Together with Abe Okpik and Joe Tikivik, Michael also founded Inuk Ltd., a cleaning and construction company that at one time had 50 employees.

Michael was a prominent activist in Iqaluit. He founded a housing co-operative that built 15 new houses in Iqaluit, at a time when the co-operative housing movement was a major focus of Inuit activism and would quickly become the largest private sector employer of Indigenous people. In 1956, Michael and his wife became the first residents of Iqaluit to have an insulated house constructed. Michael was also a sculptor, producing several carvings of animals. Several of his sculptures have been sold at auction, and some of his sculptures have been housed in the University of Lethbridge Art Gallery.

Before Michael's candidacy for territory-wide office, Ronald Duffy writes that he already "had been named to just about every Iqaluit council and board in which Inuit [had] a voice". This included the municipal council that preceded the Iqaluit City Council. Michael was also one of two Inuuk chosen in 1953 to attend the Coronation of Elizabeth II as representatives of Canada.

== Campaign and election ==
Michael was elected to the Northwest Territories Legislative Council in 1966, when it met in Resolute, Nunavut.

Michael was encouraged to run in the 1966 by-election to the Northwest Territories Legislative Council by Stu Hodgson, later the Commissioner of the Northwest Territories. The creation of several new districts, increasing the legislative body up to 13 members, had left three openings for one-year terms to the council without any incumbents. Michael contested the election in the Eastern Arctic district against two non-Inuit candidates – Welland Phipps ("Weldy"), the president of Atlas Aviation, and Gordon Rennie, Iqaluit mayor and manager of the Hudson's Bay Company store – and he was elected to the 5th Northwest Territories Legislative Council.

Michael's election made him the first elected Inuk legislator in a Canadian province or territory, preceding Peter Ittinuar's election as the first Inuk member of the federal government. Some sources have identified Michael as the first elected Aboriginal Canadian, but others had been elected before, such as Frank Calder. Though Michael was Canada's first elected Inuk legislator, he was its second Inuk legislator overall, since Abe Okpik had been appointed to the Northwest Territories Legislative Council in 1965.

== Legislative career ==
=== First speech ===
Michael's inaugural speech to the Legislative Assembly lasted 90 minutes and was given in Inuktitut. In this inaugural speech, he argued that discriminatory practices remained common in the Northwest Territories, despite the council having passed legislation outlawing discrimination. As an example he mentioned the Arctic Circle Club lounge, in which Inuit were not permitted to drink. The lounge ended that policy shortly after Michael's speech. However, in response to Michael speaking in Inuktitut, the legislature adopted a rule that all subsequent comments to the assembly would have to be in English.

=== Project Surname ===
The issue that Michael is most closely identified with is the first legislative action on the question of Inuit disc numbers. In the 1940s, the Government of Canada had decided that it was unable to track Inuit using their traditional names, and it assigned numbers to each individual Inuk using a type of dog tag system. Michael spoke out against this system in the Legislative Assembly, explaining that his mail was sent to Simonie E7-551 rather than Simonie Michael, and protesting to the Commissioner of the Northwest Territories that his mail should be sent to his full name. Although this issue had been raised previously by Abe Okpik in the Legislative Assembly and was becoming increasingly salient, Michael is widely credited with attracting the attention of the press and prompting the government to pass a motion authorizing Project Surname, in which Okpik spent the years between 1968 and 1971 travelling throughout the Northwest Territories and recording each Inuk's preferred surname to replace their disc numbers. Michael's speech about the disc number system to the territorial council has been identified as the trigger that led to the system's end.

=== Health and infrastructure ===
Michael was involved in several motions pertaining to infrastructure and health in the legislature. In response to a rise in alcoholism, he prompted a referendum that restricted the availability of liquor in Iqaluit in the late 1960s. He pushed for the creation of infrastructure that would make health care more available in Iqaluit, since the prevailing practice was to take those in need of major medical care away from Iqaluit to medical centres elsewhere, which caused sick people to undergo travel and to remain separate from their family and community during their treatment.

=== Housing ===
Michael made housing a major legislative focus. In 1969, he was involved in legislation to improve living conditions at Clyde River. The town there was home to 210 people, but was built on top of a layer of muskeg that covered permafrost, which made building a major challenge and water drainage a perennial concern. There was poor health care availability, and an overcrowded school that housed 88 students, more than it had the resources to accommodate. Michael was active in legislative discussions on how to address these challenges through a large-scale building program.

Michael also toured the Belcher Islands in 1969 with Stu Hodgson. Finding the housing situation there to be one of the worst in the Northwest Territories, he wrote to the federal government and advocated for 20 new permanent houses to be built there. These efforts, and those of the Commissioner of the Northwest Territories, prompted the federal government to study the situation and ultimately provide materials for emergency housing.

== Subsequent life and legacy ==
After serving for four years in the legislature, Michael was succeeded by Bryan Pearson as the representative for the Eastern Arctic district in 1970. After leaving government, several of Michael's small sculptures of animals were sold at auction, and he gave some interviews about his life. He died in Iqaluit on November 15, 2008, at the age of 75.

Michael was elected only sixteen years after Inuit gained the right to vote in 1950, and only six years after the franchise was truly expanded in 1960 by making ballot boxes widely available in Inuit communities. This expansion of voting rights remained controversial; for example, in 1962, then-Senator Thomas Crerar called it an "error" and advocated revoking the right for Inuit in the eastern Arctic to vote. The year 1967, when Michael began to serve in the legislative council of the Northwest Territories, was also the first that the council met permanently in the north; previously it had moved around the territories, often meeting in Ottawa and governing the Northwest Territories remotely from there.

Given this context, Eva Aariak, the Premier of Nunavut, described Michael's election as "an important step forward in the evolution of our territory and its democratic institutions." Similarly, the academics Peter Kulchyski and Frank James Tester identify Michael as an important member of a "unique" generation of Inuit leaders "who seized their time to forge a new politics in the arctic", and whose leadership "deserves special recognition". As the first elected Inuk in a Canadian legislature, Michael described his role as "telling white people about the Eskimo".

Michael was a recipient of the Queen Elizabeth II Golden Jubilee Medal in 2002. Two roads were named after him in Apex: Simonie Michael Crescent, and Simonie Michael Lane. In 2020, a boat that was owned by Michael was at Apex beach, and there were proposals to preserve it.
