= 1975 Northwest Territories general election =

General election in Northwest Territories, Canada

The 1975 Northwest Territories general election was on March 10, 1975. This was the first general election since 1902 that all the members of the assembly were elected. Fifteen members were elected to the Legislative Council.

== Election summary ==
Election summary	# of candidates		Popular vote	
Election summary	Incumbent	New	#	%
Elected candidates	1	13	?	?
Acclaimed candidates	?	1		
Defeated candidates				
Total			10,813	100%
Turnout 63.9%

== Members of the Legislative Assembly elected ==
For complete electoral history, see individual districts

8th Northwest Territories Legislative Assembly
District	Member
Central Arctic	William Lyall
Central Baffin	Ipeelee Kilabuk
Foxe Basin	Mark Evaloarjuk
Great Slave	James Wah-Shee
Hay River	Donald Morton Stewart
High Arctic	Ludy Pudluk
Inuvik	Tom Butters
Keewatin	Peter Irniq
Mackenzie Great Bear	George Barnaby
Mackenzie-Laird	William Lafferty
Slave River	Arnold McCallum
South Baffin	Bryan Pearson
Western Arctic	John Steen
Yellowknife North	Dave Nickerson
Yellowknife South	David Searle
