= George Barnaby =

Canadian politician

George Barnaby is a former territorial level politician from Northwest Territories, Canada. He served as a member of the Northwest Territories Legislature from 1975 until 1976.

Barnaby was elected to the Northwest Territories Legislature in the 1975 Northwest Territories general election. He won the new electoral district of Mackenzie Great Bear. Barnaby would resign his seat a year later with fellow member James Wah-Shee in protest of the Northwest Territories government ignoring Dene issues.

Barnaby is a member of Fort Good Hope First Nation.

Legislative Assembly of the Northwest Territories
Preceded by New District	MLA Mackenzie Great Bear; 1975-1976	Succeeded by Peter Fraser
