= Elijah Erkloo =

Canadian politician

Elijah Erkloo is a former territorial level politician in Canada. He was a Member of the Northwest Territories Legislature from 1983 until 1987.

== Political career ==
Erkloo was first elected to the Northwest Territories Legislature in the 1983 Northwest Territories general election. He served one term and did not return after the Legislature was dissolved in 1987.

In 2002, Erkloo sought to become President of the Qikiqtani Inuit Association. He ran against three other candidates finishing second to Thomasie Alikatuktuk.

== Filmography ==
Erkloo appeared in the 1990 Canadian documentary Between Two Worlds.

Legislative Assembly of the Northwest Territories
Preceded by Mark Evaloarjuk	Member of the Legislative Assembly for Foxe Basin; 1983–1985	Succeeded by Titus Allooloo
Preceded by Mark Evaloarjuk	Member of the Legislative Assembly for Amittuq; 1985–1987	Succeeded by Titus Allooloo
