= Titus Allooloo =

Canadian politician

Titus Allooloo (born 1953, Pond Inlet, Northwest Territories (now Nunavut)) is a business man and former territorial level politician from Nunavut, Canada. He served as a member and cabinet Minister of the Northwest Territories Legislature through two terms from 1987 until 1995.

== Politics ==
Allooloo was elected to his first term in the Legislative Assembly of the Northwest Territories, running as a candidate in the 1987 Northwest Territories general election. He won the Amittuq electoral district.

He was re-elected to his second term in the 1991 Northwest Territories general election defeating future Nunavut MLA Enoki Irqittuq. He became a cabinet minister serving as Minister of Culture and Communications, Transportation, Education, Renewable Resources, Municipal and Community Affairs, and Associate Minister of Aboriginal Rights and Constitutional Development.

While serving as Minister of Municipal and Community Affairs, Allooloo became subject to controversy, after he replaced the Iqaluit, Nunavut town council with a Municipal Administrator. He was also accused of lying about his Ministerial travel to the Assembly during question period by Premier Nellie Cournoyea. He resigned his portfolio on November 22, 1994.

Despite being forced to resign his portfolio he ran for re-election in the 1995 Northwest Territories general election but was defeated by candidate Mark Evaloarjuk.

== Recent activities ==
After his defeat from the Legislature, Allooloo continued working towards the creation of the Nunavut territory. Allooloo toured the territories to vigorously campaign for Iqaluit, to be elected capital city in the 1995 Nunavut capital plebiscite. He later served as a member of the Nunavut Electoral Boundary Commission to draw the first electoral boundaries for the territory.

On November 12, 2004 he was appointed to a special Board of Investigation by Correctional Services Canada. The board was commissioned to investigate the circumstances revolving around the release and supervision of Eli Ulayuk, a parolee who would murder a Parole officer in Yellowknife.

== Tourism ==
Allooloo became part owner of a tourism company Narwhal Adventure Training and Tours in Yellowknife.

Legislative Assembly of the Northwest Territories
Preceded by Elijah Erkloo	MLA Amittuq; 1987-1995	Succeeded by Mark Evaloarjuk
