= John Havelock Parker =

Canadian politician (1929–2020)

Commissioner of the Northwest Territories
- In office April 15, 1979 – July 31, 1989
- Prime Minister: Pierre Trudeau; Joe Clark; John Turner; Brian Mulroney
- Premier: George Braden; Richard Nerysoo; Nick Sibbeston; Dennis Patterson
- Preceded by: Stuart Milton Hodgson
- Succeeded by: Daniel L. Norris

Mayor of Yellowknife
- In office 1964 – February 1967
- Preceded by: Ted Horton
- Succeeded by: Chet Wilkinson

Personal details
- Born: February 2, 1929 Didsbury, Alberta, Canada
- Died: March 9, 2020 (aged 91) Sidney, British Columbia
- Spouse: Helen Parker
- Children: Gorden and Sharon Parker
- Education: University of Alberta
- Profession: geologist

John Havelock Parker, OC (February 2, 1929 – March 9, 2020) was the commissioner of the Northwest Territories from April 15, 1979 to July 31, 1989. He had previously been Deputy Commissioner of Northwest Territories from 1967 to 1979.

== Biography ==
From 1959 until 1963 he became an alderman for the Yellowknife town council. In 1963, he became the mayor of Yellowknife, which he held until February 1967. While serving as mayor he was appointed to the Carrothers Commission which led to the formation of responsible government in the Northwest Territories and later the division that led to Nunavut.

His later work helped in defining the border between the NWT and Nunavut and his name was given to a protrusion known as Parker's Notch as well as Parker Line.

In 1986, he was made an Officer of the Order of Canada for his "significant contributions to the evolution and development both of the municipal government of Yellowknife and of the territorial government."

Parker died March 9, 2020, in Sidney, British Columbia, where he had been living.
