= Rae-Lac La Martre =

Rae-Lac La Martre was an electoral district of the Northwest Territories, Canada. The district consisted of most communities in the North Slave Region (Tłicho Region), which were Rae-Edzo (Behchokǫ̀), Rae Lakes (Gamèti), Lac La Martre (Whatì) and Snare Lake (Wekweètì). As of 2005, following the Tłı̨chǫ Agreement, it is now known as Tłı̨chǫ governance.

== Members of the Legislative Assembly (MLAs) ==
The members are of the Legislative Assembly (MLAs) elected by the Northwest Territories’ population. Each MLA represents a specific elector district and is responsible for representing the concerns of their constituents, by debating, passing laws and overseeing territorial government’s work.

Name	Elected	Left Office
James Wah-Shee	1979	1987

== Election results ==
=== 1983 election ===
1983 Northwest Territories general election
Candidate	Votes
James Wah-Shee	Acclaimed

=== 1979 election ===
1979 Northwest Territories general election
Candidate	Votes	%
James Wah-Shee	381	75.90%
Eddie Koyina	121	24.10%
Total valid ballots / Turnout	502	63.32%
Rejected ballots	9	
Source(s) "REPORT OF THE CHIEF ELECTORAL OFFICER ON THE GENERAL ELECTION OF MEMBERS TO THE COUNCIL OF THE NORTHWEST TERRITORIES 1979" (PDF). Elections NWT. January 1980.

== See also ==
- List of Northwest Territories territorial electoral districts
