= Michael Angottitauruq =

Canadian politician

Michael Angottitauruq Sr. (born 1951) is a former territorial and municipal level politician. He served as Mayor of Gjoa Haven and as a Member of the Legislative Assembly of the Northwest Territories from 1987 to 1989.

Angottitauruq was elected to the Kitikmeot East electoral district in the 1983 Northwest Territories general election. His district became the Natilikmiot electoral district in 1985. He stood for re-election to a second term in the 1987 Northwest Territories general election. He vacated his seat in 1989.

Legislative Assembly of the Northwest Territories
| New district | Member of the Legislative Assembly for Kitikmeot East; 1983–1985 | Succeeded by John Ningark |
| New district | Member of the Legislative Assembly for Natilikmiot; 1985–1989 | Succeeded by John Ningark |
