= Moses Appaqaq =

Canadian politician

Moses Appaqaq Jr. (born April 2, 1946) is a soapstone carver, former retail clerk, and former territorial-level politician from Sanikiluaq, Northwest Territories (now Nunavut).

Appaqaq ran for a seat in the 1979 Northwest Territories general election, he won the Hudson Bay electoral district and his first term in office. Appaqaq ran for a second term in the 1983 Northwest Territories general election. In that election he defeated six other candidates. Appaqaq was defeated running for a third term in office by Charlie Crow in the 1987 Northwest Territories general election.

After politics he became a director on the board of Qikittaluk Corporation.

Appaqaq attempted a return to politics running in the Hudson Bay electoral district in the 1999 Nunavut general election. He was defeated by Peter Kattuk. Kattuk and Appaqaq faced each other again in the 2004 Nunavut general election; he was defeated for the second time in a row.

Legislative Assembly of the Northwest Territories
Preceded by New District	MLA Hudson Bay; 1979-1987	Succeeded by Charlie Crow
