= Robert Sayine =

Canadian politician (1943–2023)

Robert Gabriel Sayine (born:September 28, 1943 Fort Resolution NT; died August 4, 2023 Fort Resolution NT) was a former territorial level politician from and former Chief for the Deninu Kųę́ First Nation from 2001 to 2007 in Northwest Territories, Canada . He previously served as a member of the Northwest Territories Legislature from 1979 until 1983.

Sayine was first elected by acclamation to the Northwest Territories Legislature in the 1979 Northwest Territories general election. He won the electoral district of Great Slave East holding the riding for a single term in office. He was not re-elected in the 1983 general election.

Sayine attempted a political comeback by running for re-election in the electoral district of Tu Nedhe in the 2003 Northwest Territories general election. He was defeated by candidate Bobby J. Villeneuve finishing fourth in a seven-way race with 12% of the popular vote.

He was Chief for the Deninu Kųę́ First Nation, having been elected to that position for the first time in 2001. He was elected to the position of Councilor for the Deninu Kųę́ First Nation on February 15, 2007.

Legislative Assembly of the Northwest Territories
| Preceded by New District | MLA Great Slave East; 1979-1983 | Succeeded by District Abolished |
