= Gordon Wray (politician) =

Canadian politician (1951–2009)

Gordon Wray (21 September 1951 Ayrshire, Scotland - 17 June 2009 Yellowknife, Northwest Territories) was a former territorial level politician from Northern Canada. He served as a member of the Legislative Assembly of the Northwest Territories from 1983 until 1991.

Wray was first elected to the Legislative Assembly of the Northwest Territories, winning a by-election held in the Keewatin North electoral district in 1982. Keewatin North was abolished a year later, and he then ran in the new Kivallivik electoral district in the 1983 Northwest Territories general election and was returned for his second term.

In his second term Wray was appointed to the cabinet, serving numerous portfolios. He was Minister of Public Works, Minister responsible for the NWT Housing Corporation, Minister responsible for the Highway Transport Board, Minister of Municipal and Community Affairs, Minister of Economic Development and Tourism and Minister of Transportation.

He was returned for his third term in the 1987 Northwest Territories general election. Wray ran for a fourth term in office in the 1991 Northwest Territories general election, but was defeated by Silas Arngna'naaq.

Wray had a passion for soccer, and in recent years he was part owner of the Blacknight Pub in downtown Yellowknife. He was married and has 5 children.

Wray died on 17 June 2009, in his Yellowknife home, at the age of 58. Wray is said to have had a heart condition but the cause of death is currently unknown.

Legislative Assembly of the Northwest Territories
Preceded by William Noah	MLA Keewatin North; 1982-1983	Succeeded by District Abolished
Preceded by New District	MLA Kivallivik; 1983-1991	Succeeded by Silas Arngna'naaq
