= Peter Fraser (Northwest Territories politician) =

Canadian politician (1921–2000)

Peter Fraser MLA

Member of the Legislative Assembly of the Northwest Territories for Mackenzie Great Bear
- In office 1979–1983

Personal details
- Born: June 21, 1921 Fort Chipewyan, Alberta
- Died: October 16, 2000 (aged 79) Stanton Regional Hospital, Yellowknife, Northwest Territories
- Spouse: Ellen Fraser
- Children: 10

Peter Colin Fraser (June 25, 1921 – October 16, 2000) was a politician, Métis leader, and highway inspector from Northwest Territories, Canada. He served as a member of the Northwest Territories Legislature from 1979 until 1983.

Fraser was first elected in a 1976 by-election to the Northwest Territories Legislature in the electoral district of Mackenzie Great Bear. He ran for re-election in the 1979 general election and won a second term. Fraser ran again in the 1983 election, this time for the district of Sahtu (which had absorbed Mackenzie Great Bear), but lost to John T'Seleie.

Legislative Assembly of the Northwest Territories
Preceded by George Barnaby	MLA Mackenzie Great Bear; 1976-1983	Succeeded by District Abolished
