= William Lafferty =

Canadian politician

William "Bill" Lafferty (1931–2003) was a politician, Canadian Forces officer and newspaper columnist from Northwest Territories, Canada. He served as a member of the Northwest Territories Legislature from 1975 until 1979.

Lafferty was first elected to the Northwest Territories Legislature in the 1975 Northwest Territories general election in the Mackenzie-Laird electoral district. Lafferty would only serve a single term in office and was defeated by Nick Sibbeston in the 1979 Northwest Territories general election.

He died in 2003 due to cancer.

Legislative Assembly of the Northwest Territories
Preceded by Nick Sibbeston	MLA Mackenzie-Laird; 1975–1979	Succeeded by Nick Sibbeston
