= Hudson Bay (Northwest Territories electoral district) =

Former territorial electoral district in the Northwest Territories, Canada

Hudson Bay was a territorial electoral district, that elected Members to the Northwest Territories Legislature from 1979 until 1991. It was abolished in 1987 when it became part of the Baffin South electoral district. The riding covered the entire Hudson Bay and the main community in the riding was Sanikiluaq in the Belcher Islands.

== Members of the Legislative Assembly (MLAs) ==
Name	Elected	Left Office
Moses Appaqaq	1979	1987
Charlie Crow	1987	1991

== Election results ==
=== 1987 election ===
1987 Northwest Territories general election
Name	Votes	%
Charlie Crow	96	
Moses Appaqaq	46	
?		
?		
?		
Total		100%
Voter Turnout ?%

=== 1983 election ===
1983 Northwest Territories general election
Name	Votes	%
Moses Appaqaq		
?		
?		
?		
?		
?		
Total		100%
Voter Turnout ?%

=== 1979 election ===
1979 Northwest Territories general election
Candidate	Votes	%
Moses Appaqaq	84	60.00%
Lucassie Inuktailuk	56	40.00%
Total valid ballots / Turnout	140	88.61%
Source(s) "REPORT OF THE CHIEF ELECTORAL OFFICER ON THE GENERAL ELECTION OF MEMBERS TO THE COUNCIL OF THE NORTHWEST TERRITORIES 1979" (PDF). Elections NWT. January 1980.

== See also ==
- List of Northwest Territories territorial electoral districts
- Canadian provincial electoral districts
- Hudson Bay electoral district in Nunavut
