= Eastern Arctic =

Former territorial electoral district in the Northwest Territories, Canada

The Eastern Arctic was an electoral district of the Northwest Territories, Canada, created in 1966 and abolished in 1975. The district was represented by Simonie Michael from 1966 until 1970, and then by Bryan Pearson from 1970 until its dissolution in 1975. As Michael was the first elected Inuk legislator in a Canadian province or territory, the Eastern Arctic district was the first electoral district in Canada to elect an Inuk representative.

== Members of the Legislative Assembly (MLAs) ==
Name	Elected	Left Office
Simonie Michael	1966	1970
Bryan Pearson	1970	1975

== See also ==
- List of Northwest Territories territorial electoral districts
- Canadian provincial electoral districts
