= Mark Evaloarjuk =

Canadian politician (1937–2002)

Mark Evaloarjuk, CM (né Evaluarjuk; 1937 – July 3, 2002) was a northern Canadian business pioneer and politician from Igloolik, Nunavut. He served as a member of the Northwest Territories Legislature from 1975 until 1983, and served as President of Arctic Cooperatives Ltd. In 1981, he became inducted as member of the Order of Canada.

Evaluarjuk was first elected to the Northwest Territories Legislature in the 1975 Northwest Territories general election winning the new electoral district of Foxe Basin. He was re-elected to a second term in the 1979 Northwest Territories general election. His occupation was being a hotel owner in Igloolik in the 1979 election.

On June 22, 1981, he was appointed to be a Member of the Order of Canada for his past work in bringing the cooperative movement to the Canadian arctic and helping to establish the largest employer of Aboriginal Canadians.

Evaloarjuk ran for a seat in the 1995 Northwest Territories general election. He defeated incumbent MLA Titus Allooloo to win the Amittuq Northwest Territories electoral district. Evaloarjuk served a single term in the Legislative Assembly until his district was abolished in 1999 when Nunavut was created from the Northwest Territories. He ran in the first Nunavut general election in the new Amittuq Nunavut electoral district. He was defeated by Enoki Irqittuq in a hotly contested race finishing second.

After his defeat, he became Vice President of the Qikiqtani Inuit Association. He died from cancer in Ottawa on July 3, 2002.

Legislative Assembly of the Northwest Territories
Preceded by New District	MLA Foxe Basin; 1975-1983	Succeeded by Elijah Erkloo
Preceded by Titus Allooloo	MLA Amittuq; 1995-1999	Succeeded by District Abolished
