= Jeannie Marie-Jewell =

Canadian politician

Member of the Legislative Assembly of the Northwest Territories
- In office 5 October 1987 – 15 October 1991
- Preceded by: Arnold McCallum
- Constituency: Slave River
- In office 15 October 1991 – 16 October 1995
- Succeeded by: Michael Miltenberger
- Constituency: Thebacha

Personal details
- Born: 7 October 1961 (age 64) Fort Smith, Northwest Territories, Canada
- Party: Independent

Jeannie Marie-Jewell (born 7 October 1961) is a territorial level politician from northern Canada. She served as the first female Speaker in the history of the Northwest Territories legislature.

== Political career ==
Marie-Jewell was first elected to the Northwest Territories legislature in the 1987 Northwest Territories for the riding of Slave River. She served that district until it was abolished in 1991. She rose to prominence in her first term in office holding a number of cabinet posts. She became Minister of Social Services, Minister of Personnel and Minister Responsible for the Women's Secretariat. She was also the Minister Responsible for the Highway Transport Board and Workers' Compensation Board and Minister for Youth. Her efforts during the 11th NWT legislature led to the renaming of her riding from Slave River to Thebacha.

Marie-Jewell ran for re-election in the new electoral district of Thebacha in the 1991 Northwest Territories general election. She was elected speaker on 13 December 1993. She served as speaker until 15 December 1994. In 1994 Marie-Jewell filed a complaint with the Northwest Territories ethics commissioner that eventually led to the resignation and inquiry into Premier Don Morin's conflict-of-interest in the shipment of government owned bison being shipped to a ranch in Alberta.

Marie-Jewell was defeated running for re-election in the 1995 Northwest Territories general election by Michael Miltenberger. She ran for her old seat once again in the 1999 Northwest Territories general election but was defeated by Miltenberger again. She again ran against Miltenberger for a third time in the 2007 Northwest Territories general election. She finished last in a field of three candidates with 16.8% of the vote.
