= John T'Seleie =

Canadian politician (born 1950)

John T'Seleie (born September 11, 1950) is a territorial level politician. He served as a member of Canada's Northwest Territories Legislature from 1983 until 1987.

T'Seleie was first elected to the Northwest Territories Legislature, he won the electoral district of Sahtu in the 1983 Northwest Territories general election. He served one term and did not return when the assembly was dissolved in 1987.

T'Seleie is the former executive director of the Sahtu Land Use Planning Board and is currently employed as a Senior Negotiator for the Government of the Northwest Territories.

Legislative Assembly of the Northwest Territories
Preceded by New District	MLA Sahtu; 1983–1987	Succeeded by Stephen Kakfwi
