= George Braden =

Canadian politician

2nd Premier of the Northwest Territories
- In office June 16, 1980 – January 12, 1984
- Commissioner: John Havelock Parker
- Preceded by: Frederick Haultain (1905)
- Succeeded by: Richard Nerysoo

Member of the Northwest Territories Legislative Assembly for Yellowknife North
- In office October 1, 1979 – November 21, 1983
- Preceded by: Dave Nickerson
- Succeeded by: Michael Ballantyne

Personal details
- Born: November 4, 1949 Rosthern, Saskatchewan, Canada
- Died: May 25, 2015 (aged 65)
- Party: Independent
- Occupation: Politician

George Braden (November 4, 1949 – May 25, 2015) was a Canadian politician from the Northwest Territories, Canada. Elected as "Government Leader", Braden would retroactively become the second premier of the Northwest Territories, after a motion was passed in 1994 to change the official title.

== Political career ==
Prior to seeking election as member of the Legislative Assembly of the Northwest Territories, Braden worked extensively with Charles "Bud" Drury, a former federal cabinet minister, who was assigned to look at further constitutional development in the Northwest Territories.

Appointed to the position of Deputy Minister for the Northwest Territories, Braden worked from Ottawa, Ontario with Walter Slipchenko (Inter-governmental Policy Analyst). Braden was first elected to the NWT Legislative Assembly in 1979. At that time the Commissioner of the Northwest Territories, appointed by the Government of Canada, was also the head of the Government of the NWT. In 1980, for the first time, the Legislative Assembly elected the Government Leader, selecting Braden, who served until 1984. Braden was the second person to hold the title as Frederick Haultain had been appointed to the position in 1897.

Some of the changes implemented by Braden allowed for additional representation in the legislative council, the removal of the appointed commissioner and deputy commissioner from the executive council and for the allowance of control of territorial affairs to elected members.

In 2009, Braden accepted the position of Policy Analyst for Dennis Patterson, who was, earlier the same year, appointed to the Canadian Senate for Nunavut.

== Personal life ==
Braden was the owner and CEO of his own company in Ottawa, Ontario from 1994. As of 2009 he lived in Barrhaven, Ontario with his wife, Lise. He was diagnosed with gastric cancer on March 7, 2015, at the age of 65 years and died on May 25, 2015.
