= John Pollard (politician) =

Canadian politician

John Pollard is a businessman and former politician from Hay River, Northwest Territories, Canada. He was a Member of the Legislative Assembly of the Northwest Territories from 1987 until 1995, serving as Minister of Finance.

Pollard was elected to the Northwest Territories Legislature for the first time in the 1987 Northwest Territories general election, representing the Hay River electoral district. Pollard was returned by acclamation in the 1991 Northwest Territories general election. He retired from legislative politics at the end of his second term in 1995.

In October 2006 he was elected mayor of Hay River. However, he resigned in January 2008, citing the combined workload of the position and the management of his own business interests.

== 2011 federal election ==
In 2011 Pollard was nominated to run in the 2011 federal election for the Conservatives in the Western Arctic. An advert in the 25 March 2011 Yellowknifer had stated that nominations would close at 5:00 pm that day, which the national party said was not a valid closure. Nomination papers for John Pollard were received after that and the territorial executive said his nomination was not valid. The territorial executive appointed former Liberal supporter Sandy Lee.

Pollard and his wife Ellen own and operate Brabant Lodge, a fishing resort near Hay River.

Legislative Assembly of the Northwest Territories
Preceded by Donald Morton Stewart	MLA Hay River; 1987–1995	Succeeded by Jane Groenewegen
