= Robert H. MacQuarrie =

Canadian politician (1935–2021)

Member of the Legislative Assembly of the Northwest Territories
- In office 1979–1987
- Succeeded by: Brian Lewis
- Constituency: Yellowknife Centre

Speaker of the Legislative Assembly of Northwest Territories
- In office 1979–1987
- Preceded by: David Searle
- Succeeded by: Donald Morton Stewart

Personal details
- Born: Robert Hector MacQuarrie; January 10, 1935 Edson, Alberta, Canada
- Died: October 20, 2021 (aged 86) Alberta, Canada
- Party: Non-partisan; Consensus government
- Occupation: Educator

Robert Hector MacQuarrie (January 10, 1935 – October 20, 2021) was a politician and teacher from Northwest Territories, Canada.

== Political career ==
MacQuarrie was elected to the Legislative Assembly of Northwest Territories in the 1979 Northwest Territories general election. He served as Speaker of the Legislative Assembly for one year. He resigned from his post as speaker because he wanted to participate in debates in the Legislature.

MacQuarrie was re-elected in Yellowknife Centre in the 1983 Northwest Territories general election. As chairman of the Special Committee on Unity, and later as vice-chairman of the Western Constitutional Forum, he played a significant role in the division of the Northwest Territories.

Legislative Assembly of the Northwest Territories
| Preceded by New District | MLA Yellowknife Centre; 1979–1987 | Succeeded by Brian Lewis |
| Preceded by David Searle | Speaker of the Legislative Assembly of Northwest Territories; 1979–1980 | Succeeded by Donald Morton Stewart |
