= Mackenzie-Laird =

Mackenzie Liard was a territorial electoral district of the Northwest Territories, Canada. It represented the in the Dehcho Region, including Wrigley, Tungsten, Nahanni Butte, Fort Liard, Jean Marie River, Fort Simpson, Kakisa, Trout Lake (Sambaa K'e), and Fort Providence.

The district first appeared in the Northwest Territories general election of December 21, 1970, and the first representative of the district was Nick Sibbeston, who won with 54.48% of the vote. It's boundaries were modified in 1979 and gained Wrigley from the Mackenzie Great Bear electoral district.

The district was abolished following the 1983 electoral redistribution, which increased the number of territorial electoral districts from 22 to 24. Its territory was divided between the newly established districts of Deh Cho and Deh Cho Gah.

== Members of the Legislative Assembly (MLAs) ==
Name	Elected	Left Office
William Lafferty	?	1979
Nick Sibbeston	1979	1983

== Election results ==
=== 1979 election ===
1979 Northwest Territories general election
Candidate	Votes	%
Nick Sibbeston	524	72.48%
Bill Lafferty	113	15.63%
Leo Leahy	86	11.89%
Total valid ballots / Turnout	723	52.16%
Rejected ballots	15	
Source(s) "REPORT OF THE CHIEF ELECTORAL OFFICER ON THE GENERAL ELECTION OF MEMBERS TO THE COUNCIL OF THE NORTHWEST TERRITORIES 1979" (PDF). Elections NWT. January 1980.

=== 1975 election ===
1975 Northwest Territories general election
Candidate	Votes	%
William Lafferty	203	31.14%
Rene Lamothe	164	25.15%
Joseph Mercredi	154	23.62%
Gary Black	131	20.09%
Total valid ballots / Turnout	652	62.01%
Rejected ballots	19	
Source(s) "REPORT OF THE CHIEF ELECTORAL OFFICER ON FEDERAL BY-ELECTIONS, BY-ELECTIONS TO THE COUNCIL OF THE YUKON TERRITORY, AND NORTHWEST TERRITORIES COUNCIL GENERAL ELECTIONS HELD IN 1975" (PDF). Information Canada. 1976.

== See also ==
- List of Northwest Territories territorial electoral districts
