= Donald Morton Stewart =

Canadian politician

Donald Morton Stewart (1923 – November 24, 1990) was a politician and civil servant from Northwest Territories, Canada.

== Early life ==
Stewart worked for numerous northern airlines, and later joined the civil service as a Department of Fisheries employee.

== Mayor of Hay River ==
He was elected Mayor of Hay River, Northwest Territories and served that position from 1964 to 1970 and a second stint as Mayor from 1975 to 1980.

== Legislature career ==
Stewart was first elected to the Legislative Assembly of Northwest Territories in the Hay River district in the 1975 Northwest Territories general election. During his first term in office he served as the Deputy Speaker.

Stewart ran for re-election and held his district in the 1979 Northwest Territories general election. He became speaker of the Legislative Assembly in 1980 after Robert MacQuarrie resigned the position. He served as speakership through 2 full terms in office until he was defeated in the 1987 Northwest Territories general election. Stewart is currently the only speaker in the history of the territory to be defeated. He died at the age of 67 in 1990.

Legislative Assembly of the Northwest Territories
| Preceded by New District | MLA Hay River; 1975–1987 | Succeeded by John Pollard |
| Preceded by Robert H. MacQuarrie | Speaker of the Legislative Assembly of Northwest Territories; 1980–1987 | Succeeded by Red Pedersen |
