= Foxe Basin (electoral district) =

Foxe Basin was an electoral district of the Northwest Territories, Canada. At one point, the district consisted of Igloolik, Repulse Bay (Naujaat), Mackar Inlet, Coral Harbour, Hall Beach (Sanirajak), Pond Inlet and Longstaff Bluff. In 1979, Coral Harbour and Repulse Bay were redistributed to the Keewatin North district and Cape Dorset to the Baffin South district.

== Members of the Legislative Assembly (MLAs) ==
Name	Elected	Left Office
Mark Evaluarjuk	1975	1983

== Election results ==
=== 1979 election ===
1979 Northwest Territories general election: Foxe Basin
Candidate	Votes	%
Mark Evaluarjuk	218	48.02%
Paul Koolerk	133	29.29%
Lucien ukaliannuk	103	22.69%
Total valid ballots / Turnout	454	67.61%
Rejected ballots	1	
Source(s) "REPORT OF THE CHIEF ELECTORAL OFFICER ON THE GENERAL ELECTION OF MEMBERS TO THE COUNCIL OF THE NORTHWEST TERRITORIES 1979" (PDF). Elections NWT. January 1980.

=== 1975 election ===
1975 Northwest Territories general election
Candidate	Votes	%
Mark Evaluarjuk	394	69.86%
Terry Pearce	170	30.14%
Total valid ballots / Turnout	564	60.66%
Rejected ballots	8	
Source(s) "REPORT OF THE CHIEF ELECTORAL OFFICER ON FEDERAL BY-ELECTIONS, BY-ELECTIONS TO THE COUNCIL OF THE YUKON TERRITORY, AND NORTHWEST TERRITORIES COUNCIL GENERAL ELECTIONS HELD IN 1975" (PDF). Information Canada. 1976.

== See also ==
- List of Northwest Territories territorial electoral districts
- List of Nunavut territorial electoral districts
