= Hay River (territorial electoral district) =

Hay River was an electoral district of the Northwest Territories, Canada. The district consisted of Hay River and Enterprise.

The district was first created in 1975. It was dissolved and split into Hay River North and Hay River South districts at the 1999 Northwest Territories general election.

== Members of the Legislative Assembly (MLAs) ==
Name	Elected	Left Office
District created
Don Stewart	1975	1987
John Pollard	1987	1995
Jane Groenewegen	1995	1999
District dissolved into Hay River North and Hay River South

== Election results ==
=== 1979 election ===
1979 Northwest Territories general election
Candidate	Votes	%
Don Stewart	546	56.06%
Ben Greenfield	428	43.94%
Total valid ballots / Turnout	974	58.20%
Rejected ballots	9	
Source(s) "REPORT OF THE CHIEF ELECTORAL OFFICER ON THE GENERAL ELECTION OF MEMBERS TO THE COUNCIL OF THE NORTHWEST TERRITORIES 1979" (PDF). Elections NWT. January 1980.

=== 1975 election ===
1975 Northwest Territories general election
Candidate	Votes	%
Don Stewart	580	57.14%
Don S. Fergusson	435	42.86%
Total valid ballots / Turnout	1015	66.88%
Rejected ballots	33	
Source(s) "REPORT OF THE CHIEF ELECTORAL OFFICER ON FEDERAL BY-ELECTIONS, BY-ELECTIONS TO THE COUNCIL OF THE YUKON TERRITORY, AND NORTHWEST TERRITORIES COUNCIL GENERAL ELECTIONS HELD IN 1975" (PDF). Information Canada. 1976.

== See also ==
- List of Northwest Territories territorial electoral districts
