= Bruce McLaughlin =

Canadian politician (born 1946)

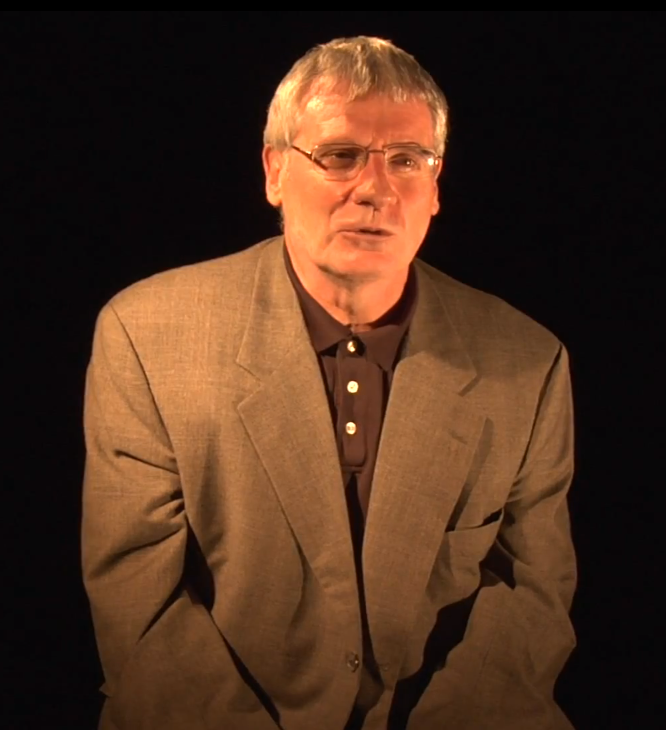

Member of the Legislative Assembly of the Northwest Territories
- In office 1979–1991
- Preceded by: New District
- Succeeded by: District Abolished
- Constituency: Pine Point

Minister of Health and Social Services of the Northwest Territories
- In office 1983–1991

Personal details
- Born: January 15, 1946 (age 80) Edmonton, Alberta, Canada

Bruce McLaughlin (born January 15, 1946) is a Canadian politician. He served as a Member of the Northwest Territories Legislature from 1979 until 1991.

McLaughlin was first elected to the Northwest Territories Legislature in the 1979 Northwest Territories general election. He won the new Pine Point electoral district. McLaughlin was re-elected in the 1983 Northwest Territories general election. In his second term he was appointed to the cabinet and became Minister of Health and Social Services. He was re-elected to his third and final term in the 1987 Northwest Territories general election. His electoral district was abolished in 1991 after the Pine Point mine shutdown operations and the town was dismantled.

McLaughlin ran as the candidate in the electoral district of Western Arctic for the Progressive Conservative Party of Canada in the 2000 Canadian federal election.

McLaughlin previously served as the Territories representative on the Conservative Party of Canada national council.

2000 Canadian federal election: Western Arctic
| Party | Candidate | Votes | % | ±% | Expenditures |
|---|---|---|---|---|---|
| Liberal | Ethel Blondin-Andrew | 5,855 | 45.60 | +3.96 | $56,498 |
| New Democratic | Dennis Bevington | 3,430 | 26.71 | +7.41 | $27,323 |
| Alliance | Fred Turner | 2,273 | 17.70 | +2.99 | $15,406 |
| Progressive Conservative | Bruce McLaughlin | 1,282 | 9.98 | –2.64 | $8,374 |
| Total valid votes | | 12,840 | 99.44 | | |
| Total rejected ballots | | 72 | 0.56 | –0.14 | |
| Turnout | | 12,912 | 52.24 | –6.13 | |
| Eligible voters | | 24,716 | | | |
| Liberal hold | | Swing | | −1.73 | |
Source: Elections Canada

Legislative Assembly of the Northwest Territories
| Preceded by New District | MLA Pine Point; 1979-1991 | Succeeded by District Abolished |
