= Keewatin South =

Electoral district of the Northwest Territories, Canada

Keewatin South was an electoral district of the Northwest Territories, Canada. The district consisted of communities in the southern parts of Keewatin Region, which included Arviat, Ennadai, Whale Cove and Rankin Inlet.

== Members of the Legislative Assembly (MLAs) ==
Name	Elected	Left Office
Tagak Curley	1979	1983
District dissolved into Aivilik

== Election results ==
=== 1979 election ===
1979 Northwest Territories general election
Candidate	Votes	%
Tagak Curley	161	33.27%
Joe Manik	118	24.38%
Peter Kritaqliuk	105	21.69%
Celina Issakiark	100	20.66%
Total valid ballots / Turnout	484	55.73%
Rejected ballots	2	
Source(s) "REPORT OF THE CHIEF ELECTORAL OFFICER ON THE GENERAL ELECTION OF MEMBERS TO THE COUNCIL OF THE NORTHWEST TERRITORIES 1979" (PDF). Elections NWT. January 1980.

== See also ==
- List of Northwest Territories territorial electoral districts
- List of Nunavut territorial electoral districts
