= Arnold McCallum =

Canadian politician

Member of the Legislative Assembly of the Northwest Territories
- In office 1975–1987
- Succeeded by: Jeannie Marie-Jewell
- Constituency: Slave River

Personal details
- Born: April 23, 1931 Charlottetown, Prince Edward Island
- Died: May 25, 2008 (aged 77) Digby, Nova Scotia
- Party: non-partisan consensus government
- Spouse: Eileen
- Children: 3
- Education: Acadia University
- Occupation: sportsperson, educator

Arnold James McCallum (April 23, 1931 – May 25, 2008) was a former territorial level politician. He served as a member of the Northwest Territories legislature from 1975 until 1987.

McCallum was first elected to the Northwest Territories Legislature in the 1975 Northwest Territories general election, winning the new Slave River electoral district. He was re-elected to a second term in the 1979 Northwest Territories general election. In his second term McCallum became the first Minister of the Northwest Territories Housing Corporation in 1982. He served that portfolio until 1983. He ran for his third and final term in the 1983 Northwest Territories general election. He served out his final term and did not return when the legislature was dissolved in 1987.

He died peacefully in 2008.

Legislative Assembly of the Northwest Territories
| Preceded by New District | MLA Slave River; 1975-1987 | Succeeded by Jeannie Marie-Jewell |
