= Baffin South =

Baffin South was an electoral district of the Northwest Territories, Canada. The district consisted of Cape Dorset (Kinngait) and Lake Harbour (Kimmirut). Before 1979, the district also included Frobisher Bay (now Iqaluit). It absorbed Hudson Bay district in 1987.

== Members of the Legislative Assembly (MLAs) ==
Name	Elected	Left Office
Bryan Pearson	1975	1979
Joe Arlooktoo	1979	1991
Kenoayoak Pudlat	1991	1995
Goo Arlooktoo	1995	1999

== Election results ==
=== 1983 election ===
1983 Northwest Territories general election
Candidate	Votes	%
Joe Arlooktoo	145	40.85%
Joanasie Salamonie	113	31.83%
Kananginak Pootoogook	97	27.32%
Total valid ballots / Turnout	353	71.46%
Rejected ballots	3	
Source(s) "Election results: Baffin South". PoliCan.

Note: The published electoral results incorrectly reported Joanasie Salamonie as the winner.

=== 1979 election ===
1979 Northwest Territories general election
Candidate	Votes	%
Joe Arlooktoo	175	54.52%
Kananginak Pootoogook	146	45.48%
Total valid ballots / Turnout	321	79.16%
Rejected ballots	2	
Source(s) "REPORT OF THE CHIEF ELECTORAL OFFICER ON THE GENERAL ELECTION OF MEMBERS TO THE COUNCIL OF THE NORTHWEST TERRITORIES 1979" (PDF). Elections NWT. January 1980.

== See also ==
- List of Northwest Territories territorial electoral districts
- List of Nunavut territorial electoral districts
