= Pine Point (electoral district) =

Coordinates: 60°50′0″N 114°28′5″W

Pine Point was an electoral district of the Northwest Territories, Canada. The district consisted of its namesake Pine Point town.

The district was created in 1979 and abolished in 1991 when the Pine Point mine was shut down in 1987 and the town was dismantled.

== Members of the Legislative Assembly (MLAs) ==
Name	Elected	Left Office
District created
Bruce McLaughlin	1979	1991
District abolished

== Election results ==
=== 1979 election ===
1979 Northwest Territories general election
Candidate	Votes	%
Bruce McLaughlin	156	37.06%
Don Hendry	148	35.15%
Cliff Reid	117	27.79%
Total valid ballots / Turnout	421	57.75%
Source(s) "REPORT OF THE CHIEF ELECTORAL OFFICER ON THE GENERAL ELECTION OF MEMBERS TO THE COUNCIL OF THE NORTHWEST TERRITORIES 1979" (PDF). Elections NWT. January 1980.

== See also ==
- List of Northwest Territories territorial electoral districts
