= Richard Nerysoo =

Canadian politician

3rd Premier of the Northwest Territories
- In office January 12, 1984 – November 5, 1985
- Commissioner: John Havelock Parker
- Preceded by: George Braden
- Succeeded by: Nick Sibbeston

Member of the Legislative Assembly of the Northwest Territories for Mackenzie Delta
- In office October 1, 1979 – October 16, 1995
- Preceded by: Lyle Trimble
- Succeeded by: David Krutko

Personal details
- Born: 1953 (age 72–73) camp on Peel River, Northwest Territories

Richard Nerysoo (born 1953) is a territorial level politician from the Northwest Territories, Canada. He was a member of the Northwest Territories Legislature from 1979 to 1995 and served as the third premier of the Northwest Territories and Speaker.

== Political career ==
Nerysoo served a long career as Member of the Legislative Assembly of Northwest Territories (MLA). He was first elected in the 1979 Northwest Territories general election in the Mackenzie Delta electoral district, becoming the youngest MLA in the history of the Northwest Territories.

Nerysoo was re-elected in the 1983 Northwest Territories general election. He was elected by the Legislative Assembly to serve as the third Premier of the Northwest Territories. His election as Premier made him the first Indigenous person in Canada to serve in the role, as well as the youngest Premier in Canadian history and the first native-born Premier of the Northwest Territories. He was re-elected in the 1987 Northwest Territories general election.

History would be made by Nerysoo again when he was elected on October 19, 1989 as the first Indigenous Speaker of the Assembly, and served in that role until November 13, 1991. He was re-elected to a fourth term in the 1991 Northwest Territories general election. Nerysoo was defeated by candidate David Krutko in the 1995 Northwest Territories general election.

In 1996, Nerysoo was elected as President of the Gwich'in Tribal Council and served until 2000. Nerysoo was one of the founding Directors of the Aboriginal Pipeline Group. Nerysoo was the founding member of Gwich'in Council International, a body that represents the Gwich'in in Alaska, Yukon, and the Northwest Territories as permanent participants on the Arctic Council.

Nerysoo was elected Chief of the Inuvik Native Band and President of the Nihtat Gwich'in Council in 2003 and served until 2008. He was selected as the Chief Negotiator on the Access and Benefits Agreements with Imperial Oil Ltd. who represented the Mackenzie Gas Project.

He was elected as President of the Gwich'in Tribal Council again from 2008 to 2012, during which time he served as the Chair and President of the Gwich'in Development Corporation.

Nerysoo was a member of the Working Group on Natural Resources Development as a representative of the Assembly of First Nations. Nerysoo was also selected as the Co-chair of the Chiefs Committee on Economic Development.

Nerysoo served as the Chief Negotiator on NWT Transboundary rights and interest for the First Nation of Na-Cho Nyäk Dun.

Legislative Assembly of the Northwest Territories
| Preceded by Lyle Trimble | MLA Mackenzie Delta; 1979–1995 | Succeeded by David Krutko |
| Preceded by George Braden | Premier of the Northwest Territories; 1984–1985 | Succeeded by Nick Sibbeston |
| Preceded by Red Pedersen | Speaker of the Legislative Assembly of Northwest Territories; 1989–1991 | Succeeded by Michael Ballantyne |
