= Western Arctic (Northwest Territories electoral district) =

Former electoral district in the Northwest Territories, Canada

The Western Arctic was an electoral district of the Northwest Territories, Canada. The district consisted of Inuvialuit Settlement Region areas within Northwest Territories, namely the hamlets of Tuktoyaktuk, Paulatuk, Sachs Harbour, Holman (Ulukhaktok) and nearby DEW line sites (Clinton Point, Cape Parry and Nicholson Peninsula), but excludes Inuvik and Aklavik.

== Members of the Legislative Assembly (MLAs) ==
Name	Elected	Left Office
Duncan Pryde	1967	1970
Tom Butters	1970	1975
John Steen	1975	1979
Nellie Cournoyea	1979	1983
District dissolved into Nunakput

== Election results ==
=== 1979 election ===
1979 Northwest Territories general election
Candidate	Votes	%
Nellie Cournoyea	276	58.97%
John Steen	108	23.08%
David Anderson	84	17.95%
Total valid ballots / Turnout	468	70.25%
Rejected ballots	2	
Source(s) "REPORT OF THE CHIEF ELECTORAL OFFICER ON THE GENERAL ELECTION OF MEMBERS TO THE COUNCIL OF THE NORTHWEST TERRITORIES 1979" (PDF). Elections NWT. January 1980.

== See also ==
- List of Northwest Territories territorial electoral districts
