= James Wah-Shee =

Canadian politician (born 1945)

James Wah-Shee (born 1945 as James Washie) is Tłı̨chǫ elder and a former territorial level politician from Northwest Territories, Canada. He served as a Member of the Northwest Territories Legislature from 1979 until 1987.

== Biography ==
In the 1971, Wah-Shee became the fourth President of the Indian Brotherhood of the Northwest Territories, first established in 1969, which would later become the Dene Nation.

Wah-Shee ran for a seat in the Northwest Territories Legislature in the 1975 Northwest Territories general election. His candidacy caused controversy at the time, because he ran for election against the wishes of the Dene chiefs. In response to his running for office he was deposed as President. George Erasmus, who was leading a boycott on Dene running in the territorial elections at the time, replaced him. Wah-Shee was elected, winning the Great Slave electoral district.

After being elected to his first term, Wah-Shee quickly resigned with fellow Member George Barnaby over the lack of attention to Dene issues being focused on in the Legislature. The Northwest Territories government responded by creating the Department of Natural and Cultural Affairs to focus on aboriginal issues. Wah-Shee was returned to council in the subsequent by-election and Erasmus lifted his boycott.

He ran for re-election in the 1979 Northwest Territories general election and was elected to the new Rae-Lac La Martre electoral district, after his old district was split. Wah-Shee would be re-elected to his final term in office in the 1983 Northwest Territories general election. He did not return when the Legislature dissolved in 1987.

Wah-Shee attempted to win a seat again in the 1999 Northwest Territories general election but was defeated by Leon Lafferty in a tight eight-way race.

Wah-Shee designed the flag for the Tłı̨chǫ Government.

Legislative Assembly of the Northwest Territories
New district	Member of the Legislative Assembly for Great Slave; 1975–1979	Succeeded by Bill Braden
New district	Member of the Legislative Assembly for Rae-Lac La Martre; 1979–1987	Succeeded by Henry Zoe
