= Tom Butters (politician) =

Canadian politician

Thomas H. Butters, CM (June 1925 – March 2, 2015) was a politician from Northwest Territories, Canada. He had a long career as a Member of the Northwest Territories Legislature from 1970 until 1991.

Butters was first elected to the Northwest Territories Legislature in the 1970 Northwest Territories general election. He won the new electoral district of Western Arctic defeating incumbent Duncan Pryde. Due to a significant redistribution of electoral district in 1975, Butters ran for re-election in the 1975 Northwest Territories general election in the new Inuvik electoral district because Western Arctic no longer covered his home in Inuvik. He won re-election in the new riding.

Butters was re-elected for a third term in the 1979 Northwest Territories general election. In his third term he was appointed as the Minister of Finance by Premier George Braden in 1981. The posting was significant as Butters became the first elected member to hold the role since Frederick Haultain, who was acting territorial treasurer in 1905.

Butters sought a fourth term in the 1983 Northwest Territories general election, and was re-elected for his fifth and final term in the 1987 Northwest Territories general election, retiring in 1991. He served as Minister of the Northwest Territories Housing Corporation from 1989 until 1991.

In 1994, he was made a Member of the Order of Canada. He died in Duncan, British Columbia in 2015, aged 89.

Legislative Assembly of the Northwest Territories
Preceded by Duncan Pryde	MLA Western Arctic; 1970-1975	Succeeded by John Steen
Preceded by New District	MLA Inuvik; 1975-1991	Succeeded by Fred Koe
