= Ludy Pudluk =

Canadian politician (1943–2019)

Ludy Pudluk ONu (January 31, 1943 – July 1, 2019) was a Canadian territorial level politician and cabinet minister. A climate change activist, he resided in Resolute, Nunavut.

== Life ==
Pudluk was born on January 31, 1943, Qaumarjuiton in Navy Board Inlet, near Pond Inlet. In 1958, the family moved to Resolute, Nunavut, at the time part of the Northwest Territories, where he remained. In 2008, he appeared before the Qikiqtani Truth Commission to give testimony about the sled dog killing by the Royal Canadian Mounted Police. Pudluk was made a member of the Order of Nunavut in 2017. He died July 1, 2019, in Iqaluit.

== Political career ==
Pudluk was first elected to the Legislative Assembly of the Northwest Territories in the 1975 Northwest Territories general election winning the High Arctic electoral district. He was re-elected to his second term in the 1979 Northwest Territories general election. He ran for a third term and was re-elected in the 1983 Northwest Territories general election.

Pudluk was re-elected to a fourth term and his last as High Arctic MLA in the 1987 Northwest Territories general election. Pudluk's district changed to the Quttiktuq electoral district with redistribution and renaming in the 1991 Northwest Territories general election. He was re-elected to his final term and retired from the legislature in 1995 after having served 20 consecutive years in office.

After retiring from territorial politics, he served as mayor of Resolute.

Legislative Assembly of the Northwest Territories
Preceded by Welland Phipps	Member of the Legislative Assembly for High Arctic; 1975–1991	Succeeded by Levi Barnabas
Preceded by Welland Phipps	Member of the Legislative Assembly for Quttiktuq; 1991–1995	Succeeded by Levi Barnabas
