= Nick Sibbeston =

Canadian politician (born 1943)

The Honourable Nick G. Sibbeston
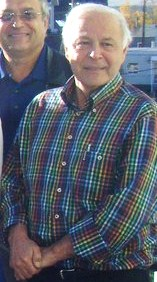

Senator for Northwest Territories
- In office September 2, 1999 – November 21, 2017
- Nominated by: Jean Chrétien
- Appointed by: Roméo LeBlanc
- Preceded by: Willie Adams
- Succeeded by: Margaret Dawn Anderson

4th Premier of the Northwest Territories
- In office November 5, 1985 – November 12, 1987
- Commissioner: John Havelock Parker
- Preceded by: Richard Nerysoo
- Succeeded by: Dennis Patterson

MLA for Mackenzie-Laird
- In office December 21, 1970 – March 10, 1975
- Preceded by: first member
- Succeeded by: William Lafferty
- In office October 1, 1979 – November 21, 1983
- Preceded by: William Lafferty
- Succeeded by: district abolished

MLA for Deh Cho Gah
- In office November 21, 1983 – October 5, 1987
- Preceded by: first member
- Succeeded by: district abolished

MLA for Nahendeh
- In office October 5, 1987 – October 15, 1991
- Preceded by: first member
- Succeeded by: Jim Antoine

Personal details
- Born: November 21, 1943 (age 82) Fort Simpson, Northwest Territories
- Party: Non-affiliated
- Other political affiliations: Liberal (until 2014); Independent Liberal (2014-2016)
- Spouse: Karen Sibbeston
- Education: University of Alberta
- Occupation: Lawyer
- Profession: politician
- Website: https://nicksibbeston.com

Nick G. Sibbeston (born November 21, 1943) is a retired Canadian politician, serving from 1985 to 1987 as the fourth premier of the Northwest Territories.

Sibbeston was a Senator representing the Northwest Territories from 1999 until 2017, when he resigned on his 74th birthday, a year prior to reaching the mandatory retirement age. He was also a Member of the Legislative Assembly in the Northwest Territories representing Mackenzie-Laird from 1970 to 1975 and from 1979 until 1991.

== Early life and career ==
Sibbeston is Métis from Fort Simpson, Northwest Territories. Considered a residential-school survivor, he attended residential schools in Fort Simpson, Providence, Inuvik, and Yellowknife. He went on to attend the University of Alberta, where he graduated with Bachelor of Arts and Law degrees.

== Career ==
=== Territorial politics ===
In 1970, Sibbeston was elected to a four-year term on the North West Territorial Council, after which he was defeated by William Lafferty in the 1975 Northwest Territories general election.

He was re-elected in the 1979 general election and would continue to be a Member of the Legislative Assembly until 1991. During his second term in the Legislative Assembly, Sibbeston was elected to serve in the Executive Council (cabinet).

In a 1981 incident, Sibbeston was thrown out of the territorial legislature for throwing a cup of coffee at Peter Fraser, the speaker of the legislature, during an intense debate.

He would serve six years in Cabinet until he was elected to serve as the fourth Premier of the Northwest Territories from 1985 until 1987.

=== Civil servant ===
After 1991, Sibbeston worked briefly for the Government of Northwest Territories, as a justice specialist and as a public administrator for Deh Cho Health & Social Services. He also served four years on the Canadian Human Rights Panel/Tribunal, as well as being a cultural and Slavey-language advisor for the television program North of 60.

=== Federal politics ===
Sibbeston was appointed to the Senate of Canada on September 2, 1999, on the advice of Liberal prime minister Jean Chrétien. In the Senate, one of his goals was to find a new name for the Northwest Territories. He also focused on issues such as the Mackenzie Valley Pipeline, infrastructure in the North, climate change mitigation, and increasing Indigenous engagement in the economy.

On January 29, 2014, Liberal Party leader Justin Trudeau announced that all Liberal Senators, including Sibbeston, were removed from the Liberal caucus, and would continue sitting as Independents. According to Senate Opposition leader James Cowan, the Senators will still refer to themselves as Liberals even if they are no longer members of the parliamentary Liberal caucus. Sibbeston agreed with Trudeau's decision, saying that the Northwest Territories also did not have a party system. That same month, Sibbeston defended his absence from 51 out of 70 votes in the previous parliamentary session, his reason being the nastiness of partisan party politics in Ottawa, which he was not used to in the north.

On May 5, 2016, Sibbeston left the Senate Liberal caucus to sit as an independent senator.

In September 2017, Sibbeston announced that he would resign on November 21, his 74th birthday. Sibbeston said that he would focus on his family, travel, and spirituality as well as translating Catholic liturgy into the Dene language.

Legislative Assembly of the Northwest Territories
Preceded by New District	MLA for Mackenzie-Laird; 1970–1975	Succeeded by William Lafferty
Preceded by William Lafferty	MLA for Mackenzie-Laird; 1979–1983	Succeeded by District Abolished
Preceded by New District	MLA for Deh Cho Gah; 1983–1987	Succeeded by District Abolished
Preceded by New District	MLA Nahendeh; 1987–1991	Succeeded by Jim Antoine
Preceded by Richard Nerysoo	Premier of the Northwest Territories; 1985–1987	Succeeded by Dennis Patterson
Parliament of Canada
Preceded by Willie Adams	Senator for Northwest Territories; 1999–2017	Succeeded by Margaret Dawn Anderson
