= Keewatin North =

Electoral district, Canada

Keewatin North was an electoral district of the Northwest Territories, Canada. The district consisted of communities in the northern parts of Keewatin Region, which included Baker Lake, Chesterfield Inlet, Repulse Bay (Naujaat) and Coral Harbour.

== Members of the Legislative Assembly (MLAs) ==
Name	Elected	Left Office
William Noah	1979	1982

== Election results ==
=== 1979 election ===
1979 Northwest Territories general election
Candidate	Votes	%
William Noah	237	54.23%
Donat Milortok	200	45.7%
Total valid ballots / Turnout	437	56.67%
Rejected ballots	5	
Source(s) "REPORT OF THE CHIEF ELECTORAL OFFICER ON THE GENERAL ELECTION OF MEMBERS TO THE COUNCIL OF THE NORTHWEST TERRITORIES 1979" (PDF). Elections NWT. January 1980.

== See also ==
- List of Northwest Territories territorial electoral districts
- List of Nunavut territorial electoral districts
