= Slave River (electoral district) =

Slave River was an electoral district of the Northwest Territories, Canada. The district consisted of Fort Smith.

== Members of the Legislative Assembly (MLAs) ==
Name	Elected	Left Office
District created
Arnold McCallum	1975	1987
Jeannie Marie-Jewell	1987	1991
District dissolved into Thebacha

== Election results ==
=== 1979 election ===
1979 Northwest Territories general election
Candidate	Votes	%
Arnold McCallum	311	36.16%
Richard McNelly	301	35.00%
Jim Evans	190	22.09%
Marguerite Robinson	55	6.40%
Clayton Burke	3	0.35%
Total valid ballots / Turnout	860	74.01%
Rejected ballots	14	
Source(s) "REPORT OF THE CHIEF ELECTORAL OFFICER ON THE GENERAL ELECTION OF MEMBERS TO THE COUNCIL OF THE NORTHWEST TERRITORIES 1979" (PDF). Elections NWT. January 1980.

== See also ==
- List of Northwest Territories territorial electoral districts
