= High Arctic (electoral district) =

Electoral district of the Northwest Territories, Canada

The High Arctic was an electoral district of the Northwest Territories, Canada. The district consisted of Alert, Eureka, Mould Bay, Resolute, Grise Fiord, Arctic Bay, Nanisivik and Little Cornwallis Island.

== Members of the Legislative Assembly (MLAs) ==
Name	Elected	Left Office
District created
Welland Phipps	1970	1975
Ludy Pudluk	1975	1987

== Election results ==
=== 1983 election ===
1983 Northwest Territories general election
Candidate	Votes	%
Ludy Pudluk	183	54.30%
Frank Pearce	154	45.70%
Total valid ballots / Turnout	337	62.85%
Rejected ballots	3	
Source(s) "REPORT OF THE CHIEF ELECTORAL OFFICER ON THE GENERAL ELECTION OF MEMBERS TO THE COUNCIL OF THE NORTHWEST TERRITORIES 1983" (PDF). Elections NWT. May 1984.

=== 1979 election ===
1979 Northwest Territories general election
Candidate	Votes	%
Ludy Pudluk	147	74.24%
Lloyd Ellsworth	51	25.76%
Total valid ballots / Turnout	198	38.85%
Rejected ballots	4	
Source(s) "REPORT OF THE CHIEF ELECTORAL OFFICER ON THE GENERAL ELECTION OF MEMBERS TO THE COUNCIL OF THE NORTHWEST TERRITORIES 1979" (PDF). Elections NWT. January 1980.

=== 1975 election ===
1975 Northwest Territories general election
Candidate	Votes	%
Ludy Pudluk	137	31.20%
Kenn Harper	119	27.11%
Simeonie Amagoalik	72	16.40%
Paul Koolerk	59	13.44%
Charlie Inuarak	52	11.85%
Total valid ballots / Turnout	439	83.68%
Rejected ballots	2	
Source(s) "REPORT OF THE CHIEF ELECTORAL OFFICER ON FEDERAL BY-ELECTIONS, BY-ELECTIONS TO THE COUNCIL OF THE YUKON TERRITORY, AND NORTHWEST TERRITORIES COUNCIL GENERAL ELECTIONS HELD IN 1975" (PDF). Information Canada. 1976.

== See also ==
- List of Northwest Territories territorial electoral districts
- List of Nunavut territorial electoral districts
