= Inuvik (electoral district) =

Former territorial electoral district in the Northwest Territories, Canada

Inuvik was a territorial electoral district representing the city of Inuvik, Northwest Territories. It was dissolved for the 1999 territorial election, with two new districts, Inuvik Boot Lake and Inuvik Twin Lakes. Its last sitting Member was Floyd Roland. Members of the Legislative Assembly (MLAs) from Inuvik are elected in non-partisan territorial elections and serve as representatives in the consensus-style government of the territory.

== Members of the Legislative Assembly (MLAs) ==
Name	Elected	Left Office
Tom Butters	1975	1983

== Election results ==
=== 1979 election ===
1979 Northwest Territories general election
Candidate	Votes	%
Tom Butters	296	44.85%
Alex Forman	174	26.36%
John Burch	98	14.85%
Cece McCauley	92	13.94%
Total valid ballots / Turnout	660	59.27%
Rejected ballots	5	
Source(s) "REPORT OF THE CHIEF ELECTORAL OFFICER ON THE GENERAL ELECTION OF MEMBERS TO THE COUNCIL OF THE NORTHWEST TERRITORIES 1979" (PDF). Elections NWT. January 1980.

=== 1975 election ===
1975 Northwest Territories general election
Candidate	Votes	%
Tom Butters	422	62.61%
Doug Dittrich	252	37.39%
Total valid ballots / Turnout	674	46.62%
Rejected ballots	15	
Source(s) "REPORT OF THE CHIEF ELECTORAL OFFICER ON FEDERAL BY-ELECTIONS, BY-ELECTIONS TO THE COUNCIL OF THE YUKON TERRITORY, AND NORTHWEST TERRITORIES COUNCIL GENERAL ELECTIONS HELD IN 1975" (PDF). Information Canada. 1976.

== Boundaries and Geography ==
The district encompasses most of the municipal area of Inuvik, the administrative and service hub for the western Arctic. Its boundaries are defined by territorial electoral redistribution processes, which periodically adjust representation to reflect population changes in the region.

== See also ==
- List of Northwest Territories territorial electoral districts
