= Dennis Patterson =

Canadian politician (born 1948)

The Honourable Dennis Patterson

Deputy Leader of the Canadian Senators Group
- In office March 21, 2022 – October 31, 2023
- Leader: Scott Tannas (acting)
- Preceded by: Josée Verner
- Succeeded by: Rebecca Patterson

5th Premier of the Northwest Territories
- In office November 12, 1987 – November 14, 1991
- Commissioner: John Havelock Parker; Daniel L. Norris
- Preceded by: Nick Sibbeston
- Succeeded by: Nellie Cournoyea

Canadian Senator from Nunavut
- In office August 27, 2009 – December 29, 2023
- Nominated by: Stephen Harper
- Appointed by: Michaëlle Jean
- Preceded by: Willie Adams
- Succeeded by: Nancy Karetak-Lindell

Member of the Legislative Assembly of the Northwest Territories for Frobisher Bay (Iqaluit; 1983–1995)
- In office October 1, 1979 – October 16, 1995
- Preceded by: Riding established
- Succeeded by: Ed Picco

Personal details
- Born: Dennis Glen Patterson; December 30, 1948 (age 77) Vancouver, British Columbia, Canada
- Party: Canadian Senators Group
- Other political affiliations: Conservative (2009–2022)
- Occupation: Lawyer
- Profession: Politician

Dennis Glen Patterson (born December 30, 1948) is a Canadian politician and lawyer who was senator from Nunavut from 2009 until his retirement in 2023. He was the fifth premier of the Northwest Territories from 1987 to 1991. Patterson played a key role in the settlement of the Inuvialuit final agreement and the Nunavut final land claim agreement. Patterson was named to the Senate by Prime Minister Stephen Harper, sitting as a Conservative until 2022, when he joined the Canadian Senators Group (CSG).

== Career ==
He served as a member of the Legislative Assembly of Northwest Territories (MLA) for Frobisher Bay and Iqaluit from 1978 to 1995, as minister of education, justice and municipal affairs, and was chosen as the fifth premier of Northwest Territories in 1987, serving to 1991. He headed the campaign that led to the creation of Nunavut in 1999.

Patterson has served as a director of the Northwest Territories Law Foundation and as chair of the Northwest Territories and Nunavut Legal Services Board until 2000. He became a private consultant in 2001.

Patterson was named to the Senate of Canada by Stephen Harper on August 27, 2009. He represented Nunavut as a Conservative until February 4, 2022, when he announced he would be leaving the Conservative Senators Group to join the Canadian Senators Group in protest over other Conservative members support of the "Freedom Convoy" protests. Patterson retired from the Senate of Canada on December 29, 2023.
