= Nellie Cournoyea =

Canadian politician

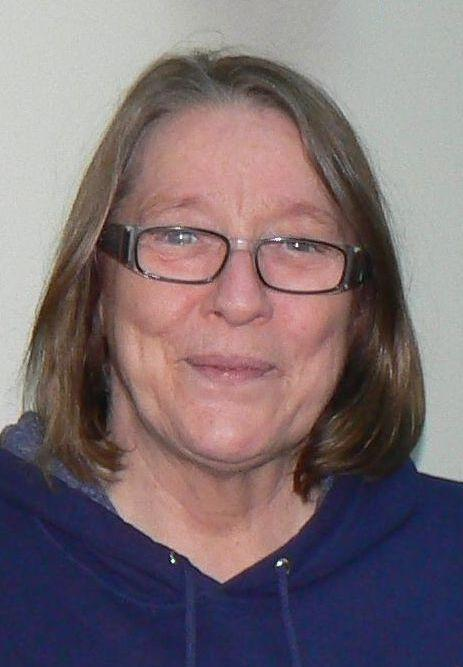
- Nellie Cournoyea in Inuvik, 2006

6th Premier of the Northwest Territories
- In office November 14, 1991 – November 22, 1995
- Commissioner: Daniel L. Norris; Helen Maksagak
- Preceded by: Dennis Patterson
- Succeeded by: Don Morin

MLA for Western Arctic
- In office October 1, 1979 – November 21, 1983
- Preceded by: John Steen
- Succeeded by: riding dissolved

MLA for Nunakput
- In office November 21, 1983 – October 16, 1995
- Preceded by: new district
- Succeeded by: Vince Steen

Personal details
- Born: March 4, 1940 (age 86) Aklavik, Northwest Territories, Canada
- Party: non-partisan consensus government

Nellie Cournoyea OC ONWT (born March 4, 1940 in Aklavik, Northwest Territories) is a Canadian politician, who served as the sixth premier of the Northwest Territories from 1991 to 1995. She was the first female premier of a Canadian territory, first Indigenous female premier (Inuvialuk) of a Canadian province / territory and the second female premier in Canadian history after Rita Johnston of British Columbia.

Cournoyea is of mixed Norwegian and Iñupiat heritage.

Before entering politics, Cournoyea was an announcer and station manager for CBC North in Inuvik, and a land claims worker for the Inuit Tapirisat of Canada, now Inuit Tapiriit Kanatami.

She was first elected to the territorial Legislative Assembly in 1979, representing the electoral district of Western Arctic until it was dissolved in 1983, and then the new district of Nunakput for the remainder of her career in politics. She served the government in a variety of cabinet positions.

On November 14, 1991, she was chosen as premier under the territory's consensus government system, in which the premier is chosen by elected members following the general election. Cournoyea served as premier until 1995, and subsequently chose not to stand for reelection to the Legislative Assembly.

Nellie Cournoyea served as chair and CEO of the Inuvialuit Regional Corporation from 1996 to 2016.

She was a winner of a National Aboriginal Achievement Award, now the Indspire Awards, in 1994, and has been awarded honorary doctorates in law from Lakehead University, Carleton University and the University of Toronto.

In 2008, she was made an Officer of the Order of Canada as well as inducted into the Aboriginal Business Hall of Fame. In 2016, Cournoyea received the Order of the Northwest Territories.

As a child, Cournoyea attended an aboriginal residential school. The Truth and Reconciliation Commission's report described how she was sheltered by Aboriginal families along her route when she ran away from an Anglican hostel in the Northwest Territories after a confrontation with a teacher.

In 2023, Canada Post announced that Cournoyea will be one of three people, alongside George Manuel and Thelma Chalifoux, honoured as Indigenous pioneers on new postage stamps.

== See also ==
- Notable Aboriginal people of Canada
