= List of Northwest Territories territorial electoral districts =

Northwest Territories territorial electoral districts are currently single member ridings that each elect one member to the Legislative Assembly of the Northwest Territories.

== Current ==
District
Deh Cho
Frame Lake
Hay River North
Hay River South
Inuvik Boot Lake
Inuvik Twin Lakes
Kam Lake
Mackenzie Delta
Monfwi
Nahendeh
Nunakput
Range Lake
Sahtu
Thebacha
Tu Nedhé-Wiilideh
Yellowknife Centre
Yellowknife East
Yellowknife North
Yellowknife South

== Defunct ==
- Banff (territorial electoral district)
- Batoche (territorial electoral district)
- Battleford (territorial electoral district)
- Broadview (territorial electoral district)
- Calgary (territorial electoral district)
- Cardston (territorial electoral district)
- Central Arctic
- Cumberland (territorial electoral district)
- East Calgary (territorial electoral district)
- Eastern Arctic
- Edmonton (territorial electoral district)
- High River (territorial electoral district)
- Hudson Bay (Northwest Territories electoral district)
- Innisfail (territorial electoral district)
- Inuvik (electoral district)
- Kinistino (territorial electoral district)
- Lacombe (territorial electoral district)
- Lethbridge (territorial electoral district)
- Lorne (electoral district)
- Mackenzie North
- Mackenzie River (territorial electoral district)
- Mackenzie South
- Mackenzie West
- Macleod (territorial electoral district)
- Medicine Hat (territorial electoral district)
- Moose Jaw (territorial electoral district)
- Moose Mountain (territorial electoral district)
- Moosomin (territorial electoral district)
- Qu'Appelle (territorial electoral district)
- Red Deer (territorial electoral district)
- Regina (territorial electoral district)
- South Regina (territorial electoral district)
- St. Albert (territorial electoral district)
- Strathcona (territorial electoral district)
- Tu Nedhe
- Victoria (territorial electoral district)
- Weledeh
- West Calgary
- Wetaskiwin (territorial electoral district)
- Whitewood (electoral district)
- Yellowknife (administrative district)
- Yorkton (territorial electoral district)

== See also ==
- Canadian provincial electoral districts
