= Nathaji Patel =

Indian freedom fighter (died 1857)

- Gameti of Chandap
- Reign: 1857
- Successor: Yamaji Patel
- Born: Nathaji Patel; Chandap, Baroda State, Bombay Presidency, British India
- Died: October 1857; Taranga Hills, Chandap, Baroda State, British India
Names
- Thakor Nathaji Patel of Chandap
- House: Gametis of Chandap
- Dynasty: Patel
- Religion: Hindu
- Occupation: Agriculturist

The Nathaji Patel was Gameti (chief or head) of the Chandap estate in Baroda State's territory during the British Raj in India. During the Indian rebellion of 1857, Nathaji Patel rose up against British rule and challenged the British authority in Baroda territory.

In September 1857, Kolis of Chandap (Chandup) rose up against British rule under Koli chieftain Nathaji who led the 2000 kolis of Angar, Dubbora and Pratabpur in Mahi Kantha. the Nathaji and Yamaji was Koli brothers, rulers of Chandap and were tributary to Gaikwad of Baroda and Rao of Idar.

On 16 September 1857, the Maharaja Gaekwad of Baroda State issued a proclamation not to rise to the people of Chandap under the Mahikantha agency and posted the 10 horsemen but Nathaji resisted the posting of horsemen so the kolis assembled together instant and attacked the Thana of that place in which a sowar of the Gaekwad Government was killed and two wounded and property plundered. The rising of Kolis affected the law and order situation in Vijapur, Kheralu and Vadnagar Taluqas of Baroda. At the end of year, Koli rebellion was crushed by the combined forces of Baroda State and British troops who destroyed the Chandap village. The kolis with stiff attitude under Nathaji continued their resistance from the hills.
