= Tłı̨chǫ =

Dene First Nations people in Canada

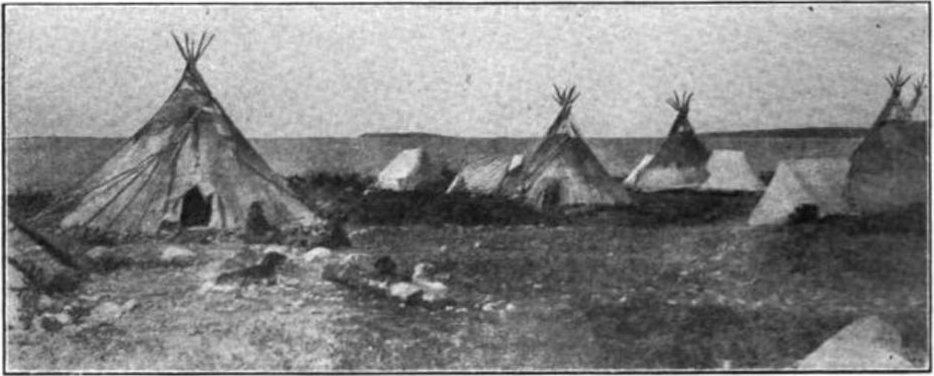
- Tłı̨chǫ tipis c. 1900.

Total population
- 1,935

Regions with significant populations
- Canada; Northwest Territories

Languages
- Tłı̨chǫ (Dogrib), English

Religion
- Christianity, Animism

Related ethnic groups
- Yellowknives, Chipewyan (Dënesųłiné), Sahtu

Tłı̨chǫ "dog-flank"
- Person: Tłı̨chǫ Done
- People: Tłı̨chǫ Done Do
- Language: Tłı̨chǫ Yatıì
- Country: Tłı̨chǫ Ndé, Denendeh

Tlicho communities in the Northwest Territories

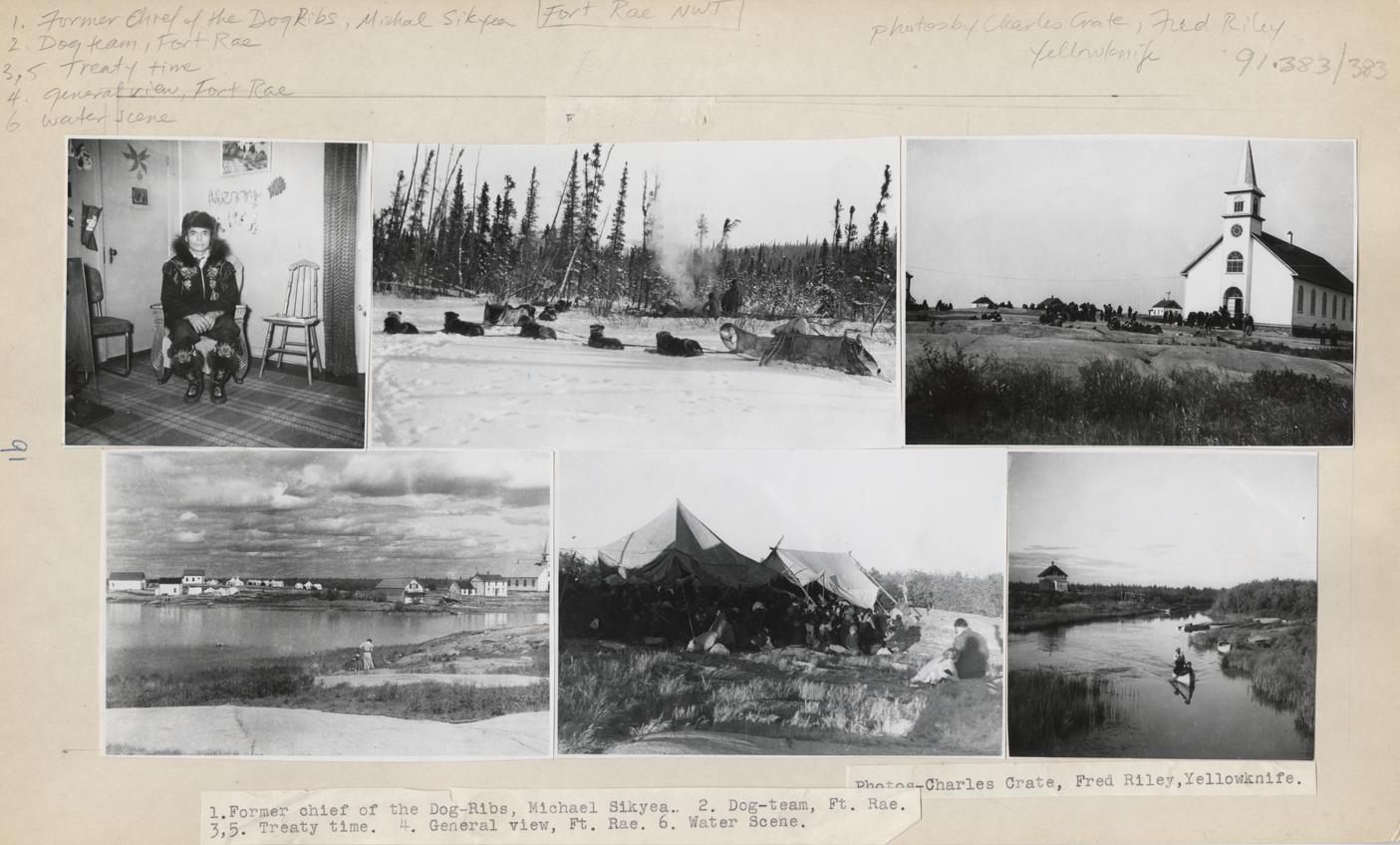
Photo album page showing Tłı̨chǫ settlement at Fort Rae

The Tłı̨chǫ (pronounced [t͡ɬʰĩt͡ʃʰõ]; English: /təˈlɪtʃoʊ/ tə-LIH-choh) people, sometimes spelled Tlicho and also known as the Dogrib, are a Dene First Nations people of the Athabaskan-speaking ethnolinguistic group living in the Northwest Territories of Canada.

== Name ==
The name Dogrib is an English adaptation of their own name, Tłı̨chǫ Done (or Thlingchadinne) – “Dog-Flank People”, referring to their fabled descent from a supernatural dog-man. Like their Dene neighbours they called themselves often simply Dǫne ("person", "human") or Dǫne Dǫ ("People, i.e. Dene People"). The Tłı̨chǫ's land is known as Ndè (or Dè, Dèe or Nèe). On the 1682 Franquelin map, Dogrib was recorded as "Alimousp[i]goiak" (from Cree Alimospikayak, "Dog-Flanks").

== Communities ==
The Tłı̨chǫ have six communities with a majority of Tłı̨chǫ residents: Behchokǫ̀ (formerly Rae-Edzo), Whatì (Lac la Martre), Gamèti (Rae Lakes), and Wekweètì (Snare Lake), the four communities of the Tłı̨chǫ Government, and Dettah (T'èɂehdaà) and Ndilǫ, the communities of the Yellowknives Dene First Nation.

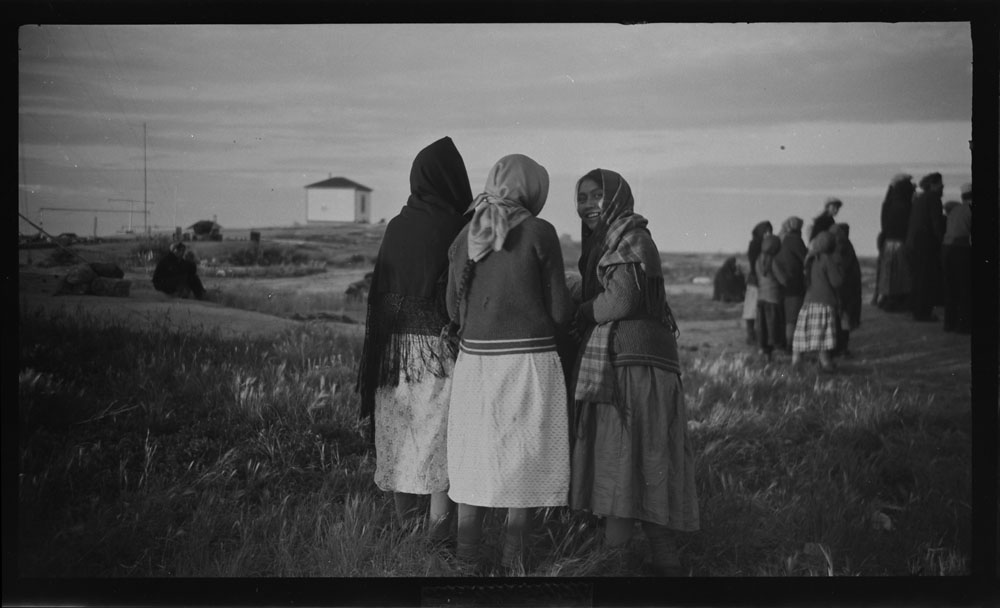
Tłı̨chǫ girls at Fort Rae in 1937

The Tłı̨chǫ Yatıı̀ or Dogrib language belongs to the Athabaskan languages, which are part of the Na-Dene languages family. The dialect spoken in the communities of Dettah and Ndilǫ developed from intermarriage between Yellowknives and Tłı̨chǫ.

== Treaty Process ==
=== Yellowknife B Band (Treaty No. 8 Dogrib) ===
In June 1899, negotiation began on Treaty 8, which covered 840,000 km^{2} (320,000 sq mi) in the Northwest Territory. It was an agreement between the Canadian Government and the Dene groups in the area in question; in return for their willingness to share their land with non-Natives, the Dene would receive medical and educational assistance, as well as treaty payments. The Canadian Government and the various Dene groups, including Yellowknives and Tłı̨chǫ under chief Drygeese with headmen Benaiyah and Sek'eglinan, signed the treaty in 1900 at Fort Resolution (called by the Tłı̨chǫ Įndàà). After the signing, the group that signed the treaty was called the "Yellowknife B Band" (Helm, 7: 1994). At that point in history, Treaty No.8 was the largest land settlement the Canadian Government had ever made (PWNHC, Historical).

=== Dog Rib Rae Band (Treaty No. 11 Dogrib) ===
Twenty years after Treaty No. 8 was signed, oil was discovered in the Mackenzie River Valley. Upon the discovery, the Canadian Government proposed another treaty that would clear the way for miners and development of the area. The treaty was greatly debated, as the Natives did not want to lose their right to hunt, fish, gather, and trap in the area. They also opposed being "confined to Indian reserves." Many Dene felt that Treaty No. 8 was not honored by the Canadian Government, and some were afraid that this treaty would turn out similarly. Nevertheless, Treaty No. 11 was signed by the Tłı̨chǫ trading chief Monfwi in the summer of 1921. The Tłı̨chǫ groups that signed this treaty were then known as the "Dog Rib Rae Band" (Helm, 7: 1994), constituting the majority of the Tłı̨chǫ population. Both Treaty No. 8 and Treaty No. 11 overlap in several of their boundaries, and continue to cause conflict between the two separate treaty bands (nowadays two First Nations).

Not all members of the Dene and Tłı̨chǫ communities agreed with or signed these treaties. In the fall of 1992, the Tłı̨chǫ submitted their own regional claim to the Canadian government. Negotiations were scheduled to begin in 1994 between the Yellowknife B Band (Treaty No. 8 Dogrib) and the Dog Rib Rae Band (Treaty No. 11 Dogrib), but the Yellowknife B Band refused to enter into negotiations. This complicated matters, as both treaty groups had land boundaries that overlapped each other. Self-governance seemed to be the issue between the two groups, as both wanted to have their say in the agreement. This halted the negotiations in 1994 while the Canadian government explored the boundary and self-government issue. A new mandate in April 1997 allowed negotiation of a "joint land claims and self-government agreement with the Dogrib Treaty 11 Council" (Treaty No. 11 Dogrib). In 1999, the Agreement-in-Principle was available for Dogrib approval and was accepted on January 7, 2000. Ninety-three percent of the Dog Rib Rae Band (Treaty No. 11 Dogrib) turned out to vote with over 84% voting for the agreement. After several community discussions and revisions, in March 2003 the Chief Negotiators initialed the agreement.

== Tłı̨chǫ First Nations ==
=== Yellowknives Dene First Nation (formerly Yellowknife B Band) ===
The Yellowknife B Band (Treaty No. 8 Dogrib) formed the Yellowknives Dene First Nation in 1991 following the collapse of this territorial-wide comprehensive land claim negotiation. They currently negotiate a land claim settlement for their lands as part of the Akaitcho Land Claim Process by the Akaitcho Territory Government. The Yellowknives Dene First Nation (known by themselves as Weledeh Yellowknives Dene) is the umbrella organization for the Dettah Yellowknives Dene First Nation (or T'èɂehdaà – 'Burnt Point' in Tłı̨chǫ, referring to a traditional Dene fishing camp) and Ndilǫ Yellowknives Dene First Nation (/ˈdiːloʊ/ DEE-loh). They speak the Dettah-Ndilǫ dialect of Tłı̨chǫ and are descendants of Tłı̨chǫ, Yellowknives and Chipewyan.

=== Tlicho Government (formerly Dog Rib Rae Band) ===
==== The Tlicho Agreement ====
The act of signing the agreement began the ratification process for the Tlicho Agreement. On Thursday, August 4, 2005, the Tlicho Agreement went into full effect, "The first official day of the Tlicho Government and the Tlicho community governments" (Tlicho Effective Date). On August 25, 2003, they signed a land claims agreement, also called Tłı̨chǫ, as the Tłı̨chǫ Government, with the Government of Canada. The agreement will cede a 39,000 km^{2} (15,000 sq mi) area between Great Bear Lake and Great Slave Lake in the NWT to Tłı̨chǫ ownership. The territory includes the communities of Behchokǫ̀, Gamèti, Wekweètì and Whatì along with Diavik Diamond Mine and Ekati Diamond Mine. The four Tłı̨chǫ bands, Dog Rib Rae First Nation, Wha Ti First Nation, Gameti First Nation and Dechi Laot'i First Nations, as well as their umbrella Dogrib Treaty 11 Council, ceased to exist on August 4, 2005, and have been succeeded by the Tlicho Government.

The Tłı̨chǫ have their own legislative bodies in the area's four communities, of which the chiefs must be Tłı̨chǫ, though anyone may run for councillor and vote. The legislatures will have, among other authorities, the power to collect taxes, levy resource royalties, which currently go to the federal government, and control hunting, fishing and industrial development.

The Tłı̨chǫ would also receive payments of $152 million over 15 years and annual payments of approximately $3.5 million.

The federal government retains control of criminal law, as it does across Canada, and the NWT controls services such as health care and education in partnership with the Tłı̨chǫ Nation through the Tłı̨chǫ Community Services Agency.

The land-claims process took twenty years to conclude. A similar process with the Inuit in the NWT brought about the creation of the new territory of Nunavut. Though Tłı̨chǫnèk'e is not a separate territory, the extent of its powers has invited comparisons both with the birth of Nunavut and with the creation of the NWT government in 1967.

== Notable Tłı̨chǫ persons ==
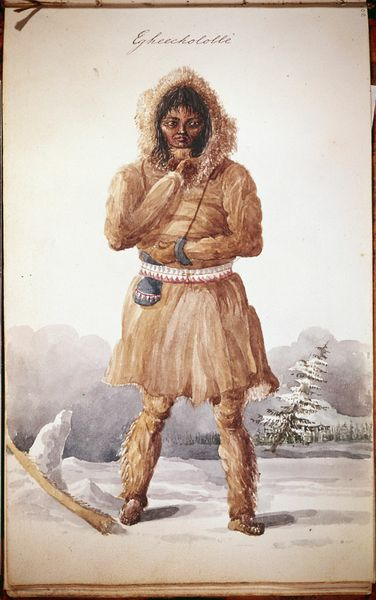
Egheechololle, a Tłı̨chǫ (Dogrib) man, watercolor by George Back from his sketchbook documenting his Arctic expedition, 1825–1826.

- Dahti Tsetso, Dehcho First Nations environmentalist and educator
- Richard Van Camp, writer, author of The Lesser Blessed
- Ouri Scott, Architect, Advocate, Principal
- Bear Lake Chief (Kʼaàwidaà, "highest trader", also known as Francis Yambi, or Eyambi,ʼEyirape, 1852-1913), was perhaps the most well known of the Tłı̨chǫ trading chiefs, in 1872, he married Emma Kowea (b. 1854) at Fort Norman (Tiłihtʼa, Tiłihtʼa Kǫ, Tulita), and together they raised nine children, member of the Sahtigotʼin (Sahtı Kʼe Hotʼı̨ı̨̀ – "Great Bear Lake People") regional group he rose to become a prominent trading chief for Tłı̨chǫ groups trading at both Old Fort Rae (Nıhshı̀ Kʼe, Ninhsin Kon) and Fort Norman, is buried on an island on Lac Ste. Croix, north of the community of Gamètı (Rae Lakes)
- Chief Edzo, great Tłı̨chǫ donekʼawi ("people's trader", i.e. trading chief), participated in a famous peace treaty at Mesa Lake in 1825 (or 1829) with the great Yellowknife trading chief, Akaitcho, ending the long period of hostility and warfare between the Yellowknives and Tłı̨chǫ
- Dzemi (Ekawi Dzimi, called by Frank Russel: Jimmie), Tłı̨chǫ dǫnekʼàawi (trading chief) at Old Fort Rae, head of the donek'awi at Old Fort Rae, Kʼàowo (leader) of the Dechi Laotʼi ("Edge of the Woods People")
- Ewainghan (called by Frank Russel: Rabesca), Tłı̨chǫ dǫnekʼàawi (trading chief) at Old Fort Rae, Kʼawo (leader) of the Etʼaa gotʼį ("People Next to Another People")
- Drygeese (also known as Dry Geese), Tłı̨chǫ dǫnekʼàawi (trading chief) at Fort Resolution (Įndàà, Deninoo Kue), signed as spokesman of the Tłı̨chǫ and Yellowknives, later known as Yellowknife B Band, Treaty 8 in 1900 at Fort Resolution
- Beniah, Tłı̨chǫ dǫnekʼàawi (trading chief) at Fort Resolution
- Little Crapeau, Tłı̨chǫ dǫnekʼàawi (trading chief) at Fort Resolution
- Chief Castor, Tłı̨chǫ dǫnekʼàawi (trading chief) at Fort Resolution
- Chief Monfwi, (EwaroʼA – "Small Mouth", May 21, 1866 – 1936), Tłı̨chǫ dǫnekʼàawi (trading chief), became Kʼàowo ("leader") of the Dechı̨ Laotʼı̨ ("Edge of the Woods People"), was appointed by the Tłı̨chǫ leadership to represent all Tłı̨chǫ groups, signed Treaty 11 in 1921 for the Tłı̨chǫ groups, later known as Dog Rib Rae Band
- The artist James Wedzin is a member of this nation from Behchokǫ̀, Northwest Territories.
- The novel White Bird Black Bird, by Val Wake, a CBC Northern Service reporter based in Yellowknife from 1969 to 1973, tells the story of Dogrib input into the formation of the NWT Indian Brotherhood. A lot of the action is set in what was then called Rae.

== See also ==
- Gahcho Kue Diamond Mine Project
