= Dogrib language =

Northern Athabaskan language

Dogrib
- Tlicho
- Tłı̨chǫ Yatıì
- Native to: Canada
- Region: Northwest Territories
- Ethnicity: Tłı̨chǫ
- Native speakers: 1,735, 90% of ethnic population (2016 census)
- Language family: Na-Dené: Athabaskan; Northern Athabaskan; Dogrib
- Dialects: Wıı̀lıı̀deh Yatıı̀
- Writing system: Latin

Official status
- Official language in: Northwest Territories

Language codes
- ISO 639-2: dgr
- ISO 639-3: dgr
- Glottolog: dogr1252
- ELP: Dogrib
- Dogrib is classified as Vulnerable by the UNESCO Atlas of the World's Languages in Danger.

Tłı̨chǫ "dog-flank"
- Person: Tłı̨chǫ Done
- People: Tłı̨chǫ Done Do
- Language: Tłı̨chǫ Yatıì
- Country: Tłı̨chǫ Ndé, Denendeh

Tlicho, also known as Tłı̨chǫ Yatıì ([tɬʰĩtʃʰõ jatʰîː]) or the Dogrib language, is a Northern Athabaskan language spoken by the Tłı̨chǫ (Dogrib people) First Nations of the Canadian Northwest Territories. According to Statistics Canada in 2011, there were 2,080 people who speak Tłı̨chǫ Yatıì. As of 2016, 1,735 people speak the language.

Tłıchǫ Yatıì is spoken by the Tłıchǫ, a Dene First Nations people that reside in the Northwest Territories of Canada. Tłı̨chǫ lands lie east of Mackenzie River (Deh Cho) between Great Slave Lake (Tıdeè) and Great Bear Lake (Sahtu) in the Northwest Territories. There are four primary communities that speak the language: Gamèti (formerly Rae Lakes), Behchokǫ̀ (formerly Rae-Edzo), Wekweètì (formerly Snare Lakes) and Whatì (formerly Lac La Martre). From a population number of about 800 during the mid-19th century to about 1,700 by the 1970s, the population has grown to about 2,080 as recorded by the 2011 Census. However, Tłıchǫ Yatıì has seen a decrease in mother tongue speakers, hence placing it under the list of endangered languages.

The Tłıchǫ region covers the northern shore of Great Slave Lake (Tıdeè), reaching up to Great Bear Lake (Sahtu). Behchokǫ̀, is the largest community in Tłıchǫ territory. According to the Endangered Languages Project, approximately 1,350 people speak the language while at home. Speakers are commonly fluent in English.

== History ==
Tłıchǫ Yatıì was traditionally only an oral language. Tłı̨chǫ Yatıì was one of the many Indigenous Canadian languages affected by the Canadian Indian residential school system. Through the British North America Act 1867 and the Indian Act of 1876, the Canadian Government formalised its unilateral control over Indigenous people and their lands. By the 1920s these schools became mandatory for all indigenous children to attend. Indigenous languages were not allowed to be spoken at these schools since the late 19th century. The last of the residential schools closed in 1996. These schools contributed heavily to language shift away from Indigenous languages, including Tłı̨chǫ Yatıì, and towards English.

In 1992, the first edition of the Tłıchǫ Yatıì Enįhtł’è - A Dogrib Dictionary was published which provided the Tłıchǫ people with a database of words and spelling. This sparked the interest of community members and became the first step in revitalization efforts.

== Revitalization efforts ==
In 2005, the Tłıchǫ signed the Tłıchǫ Agreement for Self-Governance. This allowed the Tłıchǫ people to prioritize the preservation of their language, culture and way of life. Since its implementation, the Tłıchǫ Government has been working hard to help younger generations of Tłıchǫ learn the language by declaring Tłıchǫ Yatıì as one of two official languages of the Tłıchǫ Government. Revitalization efforts include putting up signs in Tłıchǫ Yatıì, creating on the land programs, providing Tłıchǫ Yatıì classes for community members.

Tłı̨chǫ Yatıì is one of the nine official Indigenous languages of the Northwest Territories (NWT) in Canada. Because of its official status, the NWT's department of Education, Culture, and Employment, has been monitoring the language through the Indigenous Languages and Education Secretariat since 2014. This department is devoted to the revitalization of the official languages in the NWT and has policies that ensure the continued use and growth of Indigenous languages. According to the 2018 - 2019 Annual Report on Official Languages, multiple revitalization efforts have been made by the Tłı̨chǫ Government. Some of which include an Elder Evening Story Telling that occurs weekly, transcribing and translating materials into Tłı̨chǫ Yatıì for classes, setting up a radio station, and having community language classes in the language, now including immersion classes in grades K-7. In addition to local efforts, the Official Languages Act ensures that Tłı̨chǫ Yatıì and the other indigenous languages are used in providing government services.

== Geographic distribution ==
The language is mainly spoken in the Northwest Territories of Canada. The four official Tłıchǫ communities are Gamètì, Behchokǫ̀, Wekweètì and Whatì. Both communities of Yellowknife and Dettah also have many Tłıchǫ speakers, mostly speaking the Wıı̀lıı̀deh Yatıı̀ dialect.

== Dialects ==
The Yellowknives Dene speak a dialect of Tłı̨chǫ called Wıı̀lıı̀deh Yatıı̀. This dialect came into existence when speakers of Chipewyan began speaking Tłı̨chǫ after 1829 and incorporated some Chipewyan words and grammar.

== Phonology ==
=== Consonants ===
The consonants of Tłıchǫ Yatıì in IPA are listed below (with standard orthography in brackets):

		Labial	Alveolar			Post- alveolar	Velar		Glottal
		Labial	plain	sibilant	lateral	Post- alveolar	plain	labial	Glottal
Nasal	plain	m ⟨m⟩	n ⟨n⟩						
Plosive	prenasalized	ᵐb ⟨mb⟩	ⁿd ⟨nd⟩						
Plosive	tenuis	(p ⟨b⟩)	t ⟨d⟩	ts ⟨dz⟩	tɬ ⟨dl⟩	tʃ ⟨j⟩	k ⟨g⟩	kʷ ⟨gw⟩	ʔ ⟨’⟩
Plosive	aspirated		tʰ ⟨t⟩	tsʰ ⟨ts⟩	tɬʰ ⟨tł⟩	tʃʰ ⟨ch⟩	kʰ ⟨k⟩	kʷʰ ⟨kw⟩	
Plosive	ejective		tʼ ⟨t’⟩	tsʼ ⟨ts’⟩	tɬʼ ⟨tł’⟩	tʃʼ ⟨ch’⟩	kʼ ⟨k’⟩	kʷʼ ⟨kw’⟩	
Fricative	voiced			z ⟨z⟩	ɮ ⟨l⟩	ʒ ⟨zh⟩	ɣ ⟨gh⟩		
Fricative	voiceless			s ⟨s⟩	ɬ ⟨ł⟩	ʃ ⟨sh⟩	x ⟨x⟩		h ⟨h⟩
Approximant	voiced		ɾ ~ ɹ ⟨r⟩			j ⟨y⟩		w ⟨w⟩	
Approximant	voiceless							ʍ ⟨wh⟩	

Tenuis stops may be lightly voiced. Aspirated stops may be fricated [Cˣʰ] before back vowels.

Tlicho communities in the Northwest Territories

=== Vowels ===
The language uses long, short and nasal vowels, and distinguishes them in writing, along with low tone:

		Front		Central		Back	
		short	long	short	long	short	long
Close	oral	i ⟨ı⟩	iː ⟨ıı⟩				
Close	nasal	ĩ ⟨ı̨⟩	ĩː ⟨ı̨ı̨⟩				
Close-mid	oral	e ⟨e⟩	eː ⟨ee⟩			o ⟨o⟩	oː ⟨oo⟩
Close-mid	nasal	ẽ ⟨ę⟩	ẽː ⟨ęę⟩			õ ⟨ǫ⟩	õː ⟨ǫǫ⟩
Open	oral			a ⟨a⟩	aː ⟨aa⟩		
Open	nasal			ã ⟨ą⟩	ãː ⟨ąą⟩		

- Nasal vowels are marked by an ogonek (called wı̨ghǫą, 'its little nose', in Tłı̨chǫ Yatıı̀) e.g. ą.
- Low tone is marked with a grave accent (called wets'aà, 'its hat', in Tłı̨chǫ Yatıı̀), e.g. à.
- High tone is never marked.
- The letter 'i' is written without a dot (tittle).

== Grammar ==
Typologically, Tłıchǫ Yatıì is an agglutinating, polysynthetic head-marking language, but many of its affixes combine into contractions more like fusional languages. The canonical word order of Tłıchǫ Yatıì is SOV. Tłıchǫ Yatıì words are modified primarily by prefixes, which is unusual for an SOV language (suffixes are expected).

Like Spanish and Portuguese, Tłıchǫ Yatıì has two verbs similar to English 'be'. One is used for ways of being that are more dynamic or temporary; the other for more permanent and immutable properties. For example, nàzèe-dǫǫ̀ ts’ı̨ı̨lı̨ and nàzèe-dǫǫ̀ ats’ı̨ı̨t’e both mean 'we are hunters', but the first means that the speakers are currently hunters (for example, part of a hunting party), while the second implies that hunting is their regular profession.

In addition to verbs and nouns, there are pronouns, clitics of various functions, demonstratives, numerals, postpositions, adverbs, and conjunctions in Tłıchǫ. The class of adjectives is very small, probably around two dozen words: most descriptive words are verbs rather than adjectives.

== Examples ==
Example words and phrases:

- Tłı̨chǫ got'ı̨ı̨̀ – Tłıchǫ people
- tłı̨ – dog
- tłı̨cho – dog rib
- łıwe / łıe – fish
- detʼǫ – duck
- eyè – egg
- ejietʼò – milk
- dìga – wolf
- tʼooh – poplar
- deh – river
- elà – canoe
- dı – island
- kwe – rock
- sìh or shìh – mount
- tı – lake
- zhah – snow
- chǫ or tsǫ – rain
- ło – smoke
- kǫ̀ – house
- degoo – white
- dezǫ – black
- dekʼo – red
- dǫ nàke laànì nàtso – strong like two people

== See also ==
- Languages of Canada
- Indigenous languages of the Americas
