= Dechi Laot'i First Nations =

Dechi Laot'i First Nations Band No. 774
- People: Tłı̨chǫ
- Treaty: Treaty 11; Tłı̨chǫ Agreement
- Headquarters: Wekweètì
- Territory: Northwest Territories

Population (2019)
- On other land: 173
- Off reserve: 20
- Total population: 193

Government
- Chief: Charles Football
- Council: Gordon Judas; Patrick Tom; Travis Washie

Tribal Council
- Tłı̨chǫ Government

The Dechi Laot'i First Nations is a Tłı̨chǫ First Nations band government in the Northwest Territories. The band's main community is Wekweètì, known before 2005 as Snare Lake, where 173 of its 193 members live.

In 2005, Dechi Laot'i became part of the Tłı̨chǫ Government, and collectively holds title to 39,000 square kilometers of Tłı̨chǫ land. The new Wekweètì Community Government has assumed most of the band's powers and responsibilities. However, the federal government still recognizes Dechi Laot'i for Indian Act enrollment purposes.
