= Area codes 587, 825, and 368 =

Overlay area codes for Alberta, Canada

Coordinates: 55°59′30″N 114°22′36″W

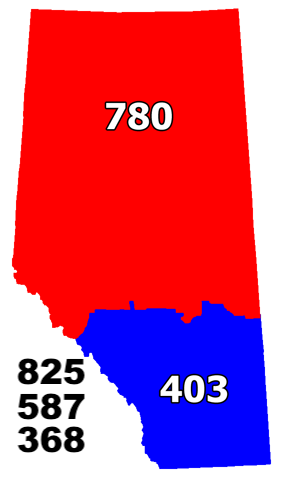
Alberta numbering plan areas and area codes

Area codes 587, 825, and 368 are telephone area codes in the North American Numbering Plan (NANP) for the entire Canadian province of Alberta. They form an overlay with southern Alberta's area code 403 and northern Alberta's area code 780. The province-wide overlay complex made ten-digit dialing mandatory throughout the province.

== History ==
Area code 403 was one of the original area codes assigned to the United States and Canada in 1947. For half a century, it comprised all of Alberta, Yukon and the Northwest Territories, as well as a very small western portion of what is today Nunavut (which split off from the Northwest Territories on 1 April 1999). In 1997, use of area code 403 was restricted to Alberta, with the territories receiving new area code 867.

In January 1999, the province was divided into two numbering plan areas. The northern two-thirds of Alberta, including Edmonton, received area code 780, while leaving 403 to serve Calgary and southern Alberta.

The projected exhaust dates for area codes 403 and 780 were March and October 2009, respectively. In 1997, two area codes, 587 and 825, were reserved by Bellcore for Alberta.

The first of the new area codes, 587, entered service on September 19, 2008, as an overlay for the entire province. As a preliminary step, ten-digit dialling was introduced across the province on an optional basis on June 23. This became mandatory on September 12. On September 20, Telus Mobility began allocating telephone numbers starting in area code 587 in the Calgary area.

An overlay was chosen rather than splitting 403 or 780. A split of 780 would have forced subscribers in northern Alberta to change their telephone numbers for the second time in a decade. Additionally, overlays have become the favoured method of relief in Canada, as they are an easy workaround for the country's inefficient number allocation system. All competitive local exchange carriers are allocated blocks of 10,000 numbers—usually corresponding to a single three-digit prefix—for every rate centre where they offer service, no matter how small. A number cannot be moved from one rate centre to another, even in a case where a rate centre has more than enough numbers to serve it. This resulted in thousands of wasted numbers. Overlays provide an easy solution to this problem; no NPAs have been split in Canada since 1999. A similar step had been taken a year earlier in British Columbia, when area code 778 was converted into an overlay complex for the entire province.

On April 9, 2016, the province was overlaid with an additional area code, 825.

As of January 21, 2022, the province is additionally overlaid with area code 368.

Area code 568 is reserved as the sixth area code for the province since November 2022.

== See also ==
- List of Alberta area codes
- List of North American Numbering Plan area codes

Alberta area codes: 403, 587/825/368, 780
	North: 867	
West: 250/778/236/672	368/587/825, 403, 780	East: 306/639
	South: 406	
British Columbia area codes: 250, 604, 236/257/672/778
Saskatchewan area codes: 306/474/639
Montana area codes: 406
Yukon, Northwest Territories and Nunavut area codes: 867
