= Tłı̨chǫ Government =

First Nations organization in Canada

Tłı̨chǫ Government Tłı̨chǫ Ndekʼàowo (Tłı̨chǫ)
- Indigenous government
- Flag
- Motto: Strong like two people
- Wekʼèezhìı within the Northwest Territories
- Country: Canada
- Territory: Northwest Territories
- Region: North Slave
- Territorial riding: Monfwi
- Established: August 4, 2005

Government
  - Grand Chief: Jackson Lafferty
  - Communities: Behchokǫ̀; Gamèti; Wekweètì; Whatì

Population (2016)
  - Total: 2,751
- Website: www.tlicho.ca

Tłı̨chǫ "dog-flank"
- Person: Tłı̨chǫ Done
- People: Tłı̨chǫ Done Do
- Language: Tłı̨chǫ Yatıì
- Country: Tłı̨chǫ Ndé, Denendeh

The Tłı̨chǫ Government, or Tłı̨chǫ Ndekʼàowo (also rendered Tlicho Government and Tlicho Ndekʼaowo), is a First Nations organization representing the Tłı̨chǫ Nation, Dene people of the Northwest Territories, Canada, and covering much of their traditional territory, Tłı̨chǫ Ndé, within the larger Dene Country of Denendeh. The devolved government was created in 2005 when the Tłı̨chǫ Nation ratified the Tłı̨chǫ Agreement with the Government of Canada.

Through this agreement certain rights relating to lands, resources and self-government were defined including Tłı̨chǫ Government ownership of "39,000 km^{2} of land located between Lake Tıdeè and the Great Bear Lake including surface and subsurface rights, the ability to define its membership known as Tłı̨chǫ citizens, jurisdiction over lands and resources across Tłı̨chǫ Ndé and establishment of the Wekʼèezhìı Land and Water Board and the Wekʼèezhìı Renewable Resources Board and a share of mineral royalties from the Mackenzie Valley." The word Tlı̨chǫ [tɬʰĩtʃʰõ] means 'dog rib'.

The traditional area of the Tłı̨chǫ described by Chief Monfwi during the signing of Treaty 11 in 1921, was called Monfwı̀ Gogha Dè Nı̨htł'è [mõfwì goɣa dè nĩhtɬ'è]. Wekʼèezhìi, the management area defined by the Tłı̨chǫ Agreement, is an area larger than the land owned by the Tłı̨chǫ. Wekʼèezhìi "shares boundaries with the Sahtu Settlement Area and Nunavut, and includes the four Tłı̨chǫ member communities of Gamèti, Wekweètì, Whatì and Behchokǫ̀." The area includes the Ekati and Diavik Diamond Mines.

== NWT Conference of Management Authorities (CMA) ==
The Tłı̨chǫ Government is one of the Management Authorities of the NWT Conference of Management Authorities (CMA) for boreal caribou, along with the Government of the NWT, the Wildlife Management Advisory Council (NWT), the Gwich'in Renewable Resources Board, the Sahtu Renewable Resources Board, and the Wekʼèezhìi Renewable Resources Board.

=== Wekʼèezhìi Renewable Resource Board ===
The Tłı̨chǫ Government appoints fifty percent of the Wekʼèezhìi Renewable Resource Board, a co-management board. The other fifty percent are appointed by the Government of Canada and the Government of Northwest Territory. The WRRB is an institution of public government, responsible for managing wildlife and wildlife habitat (forests, plants and protected areas) in the Wekʼèezhìi area.

=== Woodland caribou (Rangifer tarandus caribou) ===
Based on the 2012 Species at Risk Committee's (SARC) report, the NWT Conference of Management Authorities (CMA) in October 2013 added boreal woodland caribou to the Northwest Territories List of Species at Risk as a threatened species.

== Member communities ==
- Dog Rib Rae First Nation, Behchokǫ̀
- Gameti First Nation, Gamèti
- Dechi Laot'i First Nations, Wekweètì
- Wha Ti First Nation, Whatì
