= Gameti First Nation =

Gameti First Nation Band No. 773
- People: Tłı̨chǫ
- Treaty: Treaty 11; Tłı̨chǫ Agreement
- Headquarters: Gamètì
- Territory: Northwest Territories

Population (2019)
- On other land: 319
- Off reserve: 47
- Total population: 366

Tribal Council
- Tłı̨chǫ Government

The Gameti First Nation is a Tłı̨chǫ First Nations band government in the Northwest Territories. The band's main community is Gamètì, known before 2005 as Rae Lakes, where 319 of its 366 members live.

In 2005, Gameti became part of the Tłı̨chǫ Government, and collectively holds title to 39,000 square kilometers of Tłı̨chǫ land. The new Gamètì Community Government has assumed most of the band's powers and responsibilities. However, the federal government still recognizes Gameti for Indian Act enrollment purposes.
