= Dog Rib Rae First Nation =

Dog Rib Rae First Nation Band No. 765
- People: Tłı̨chǫ
- Treaty: Treaty 11; Tłı̨chǫ Agreement
- Headquarters: Behchokǫ̀
- Territory: Northwest Territories

Population (2019)
- On other land: 2396
- Off reserve: 896
- Total population: 3292

Government
- Chief: Clifford Daniels

Tribal Council
- Tłı̨chǫ Government

The Dog Rib Rae First Nation is a Tłı̨chǫ (formerly known as Dogrib) First Nations band government in the Northwest Territories. The band's main community is Behchokǫ̀, known before 2005 as Rae-Edzo, where 2,396 of its 3,292 members live. By enrollment, it is the largest First Nation in the Canadian territories.

In 2005, Dog Rib Rae became part of the Tłı̨chǫ Government, and collectively holds title to 39,000 square kilometers of Tłı̨chǫ land. The new Behchokǫ̀ Community Government has assumed most of the band's powers and responsibilities. However, the federal government still recognizes Dog Rib Rae for Indian Act enrollment purposes.
