= Whatì =

Whatì Wha Tì Tsõtì Mïne Kö Golàa
- First Nation
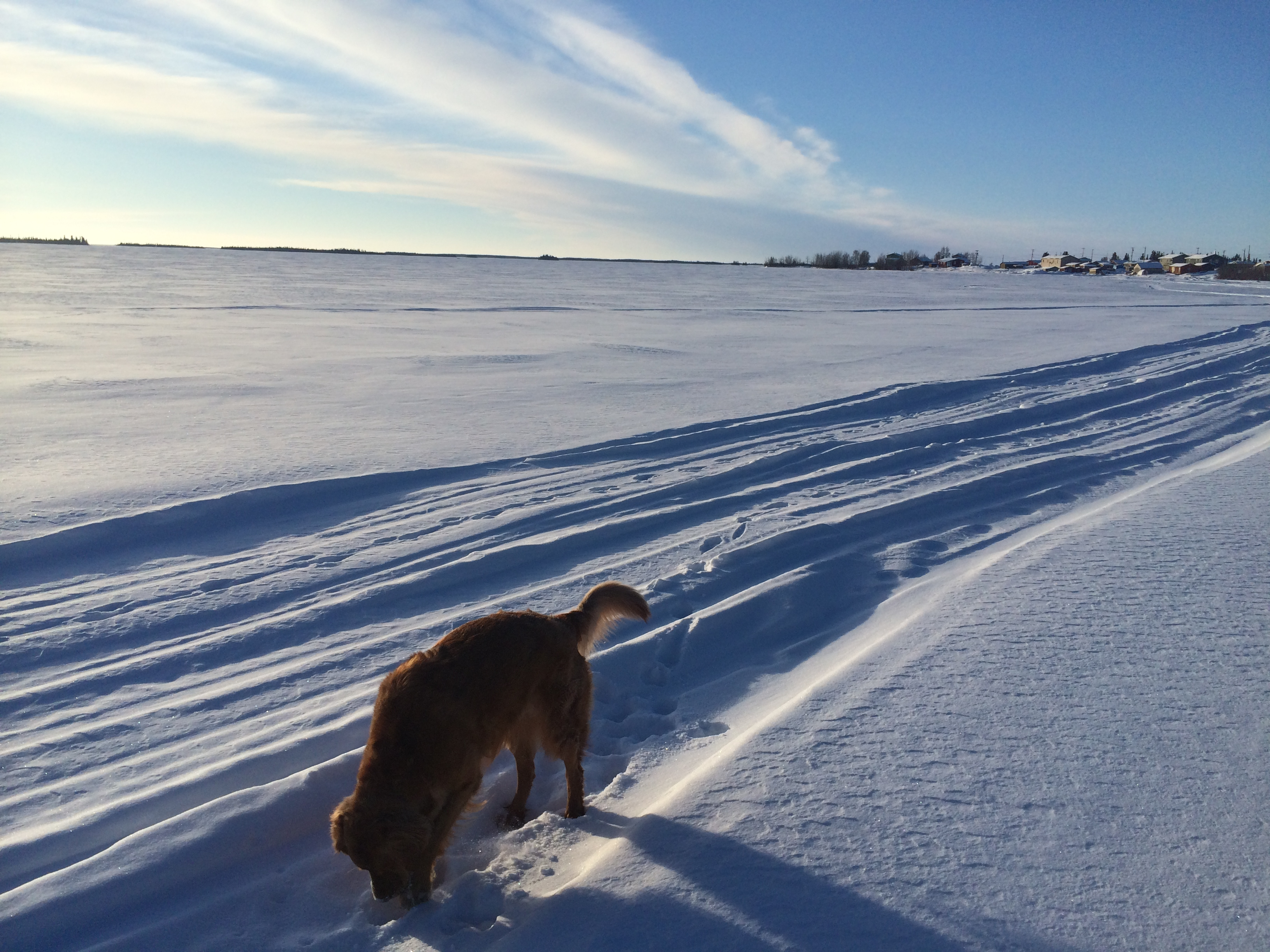

- Location within Northwest Territories Location within Canada
- Coordinates: 63°08′40″N 117°16′22″W
- Country: Canada
- Territory: Northwest Territories
- Region: North Slave
- Constituency: Monfwi
- North West Company trading post: 1793
- Incorporated: August 4, 2005

Government
  - Chief: Alfonz Nitsiza
  - Senior Administrative Officer: Lisa Nitsiza
  - MLA: Jackson Lafferty

Area
  - Land: 59.95 km^{2} (23.15 sq mi)
- Elevation: 269 m (883 ft)

Population (2016)
  - Total: 470
  - Density: 7.8/km^{2} (20/sq mi)
- Time zone: UTC−06:00 (Northwest Territories Time)
- Canadian Postal code: X0E 1P0
- Area code: 867
- Telephone exchange: 573
- Living cost: 152.5^{A}
- Food price index: 145.7^{B}
- Sources: Department of Municipal and Community Affairs, Prince of Wales Northern Heritage Centre, Canada Flight Supplement^A2013 figure based on Edmonton = 100^B2015 figure based on Yellowknife = 100

Whatì (/ˈhwɒti/; from the Dogrib language meaning "Marten Lakes"), officially the Tłı̨chǫ Community Government of Whatì is a First Nations community in the North Slave Region of the Northwest Territories, Canada. Whatì is located by Lac La Martre, about 164 km (102 mi) northwest of the territorial capital of Yellowknife.

== History ==
With rich and varied wildlife, the area has long been a favoured hunting ground of the Tłı̨chǫ (Dogrib Dene) Indigenous people. The North West Company established a trading post there in 1793, and many natives began settling there permanently, while they continued to hunt and fish in the area. With the establishment of a trading post at Fort Rae on Great Slave Lake in the late 19th century, most regional trading was accomplished at the Hudson's Bay Company and free traders posts there. A trading post at Lac La Martre was not again established until the 1920s.

On January 1, 1996, the community officially changed its name from Lac La Martre to the Tłı̨chǫ name "Wha Ti", meaning "Marten Lake," the same meaning as the French and then on August 4, 2005 to the current spelling. Other traditional Tłı̨chǫ names for the settlement include Tsoti ('fouled water lake') and Mine Go Kola ('net fishing with houses').

Before 2005, the community was unincorporated, and local governance was provided by a First Nations band government, Wha Ti First Nation. Under the terms of the Tłı̨chǫ Agreement, most responsibilities of Wha Ti have been transferred to a new Whatì Community Government. However, the First Nation is still recognized by the federal government for Indian Act enrollment.

== Demographics ==
Federal census population history of Whati
Year	Pop.	±%
1976	213	—
1981	268	+25.8%
1986	345	+28.7%
1991	392	+13.6%
1996	418	+6.6%
2001	453	+8.4%
2006	460	+1.5%
2011	492	+7.0%
2016	470	−4.5%
2021	543	+15.5%
Source: Statistics Canada

Annual population estimates

Year	Pop.	±%
2001	491	—
2002	486	−1.0%
2003	481	−1.0%
2004	490	+1.9%
2005	491	+0.2%
2006	480	−2.2%
2007	491	+2.3%
2008	480	−2.2%
2009	488	+1.7%

Year	Pop.	±%
2010	494	+1.2%
2011	490	−0.8%
2012	507	+3.5%
2013	505	−0.4%
2014	513	+1.6%
2015	533	+3.9%
2016	529	−0.8%
2017	522	−1.3%

Sources: NWT Bureau of Statistics (2001 - 2017)

In the 2021 Census of Population conducted by Statistics Canada, Whatì had a population of 543 living in 143 of its 162 total private dwellings, a change of 15.5% from its 2016 population of 470. With a land area of 58.33 km^{2} (22.52 sq mi), it had a population density of 9.3/km^{2} (24.1/sq mi) in 2021.

The majority of the population is Indigenous of which 445 were First Nations and 10 were Métis. The main languages were Dogrib and English with a few North Slavey speakers.

== Economy ==
While trapping, hunting, and fishing continue to be the main economic activities in this traditional community, efforts have been made to develop tourism as well. A fishing lodge was opened, and many tourists come to see the abundant wildlife, including black bears, barren-ground caribou, northwestern wolves, and eagles. The community takes special pride in the fact that no alcohol is allowed there.

Whatì is part of the Tlicho Government.

== Infrastructure ==
=== Transport ===
Whatì Airport connects the community by air to the territorial capital Yellowknife.

Whatì is connected to the territorial road network by the Tłı̨chǫ Highway (Northwest Territories Highway 9), an all-season gravel road running from the community to the Yellowknife Highway (Northwest Territories Highway 3). The only road access to Whatì prior to the Tłı̨chǫ Highway opening in 2021 was via winter road.

=== Communications ===
Telephone service was introduced to Whati in 1982.

== Climate ==
Whatì has a subarctic climate (Köppen: Dfc; Trewartha: Ecld) with mild to warm summers and long cold winters.

Climate data for Whatì WMO ID: 71163; Climate ID: 2202678; coordinates 63°08′01.07″N 117°14′41.05″W; elevation: 271.3 m (890 ft); 1991–2020 normals, extremes 1974–present
Month	Jan	Feb	Mar	Apr	May	Jun	Jul	Aug	Sep	Oct	Nov	Dec	Year
Record high humidex	3.9	6.5	12.7	17.1	29.1	37.7	36.8	35.2	32.3	17.8	5.4	6.1	37.7
Record high °C (°F)	4.1 (39.4)	7.0 (44.6)	13.1 (55.6)	19.6 (67.3)	29.1 (84.4)	33.6 (92.5)	33.7 (92.7)	34.4 (93.9)	30.9 (87.6)	18.0 (64.4)	5.6 (42.1)	6.3 (43.3)	34.4 (93.9)
Mean daily maximum °C (°F)	−20.6 (−5.1)	−16.9 (1.6)	−10.3 (13.5)	1.3 (34.3)	11.7 (53.1)	19.5 (67.1)	22.4 (72.3)	18.8 (65.8)	11.8 (53.2)	0.8 (33.4)	−10.2 (13.6)	−18.1 (−0.6)	0.9 (33.6)
Daily mean °C (°F)	−25.1 (−13.2)	−22.6 (−8.7)	−17.6 (0.3)	−6.0 (21.2)	5.6 (42.1)	13.5 (56.3)	16.4 (61.5)	13.1 (55.6)	6.9 (44.4)	−2.5 (27.5)	−14.4 (6.1)	−22.5 (−8.5)	−4.6 (23.7)
Mean daily minimum °C (°F)	−29.4 (−20.9)	−28.2 (−18.8)	−24.9 (−12.8)	−13.4 (7.9)	−0.5 (31.1)	7.4 (45.3)	10.4 (50.7)	7.4 (45.3)	1.9 (35.4)	−5.7 (21.7)	−18.6 (−1.5)	−26.9 (−16.4)	−10.0 (14.0)
Record low °C (°F)	−48.4 (−55.1)	−47.4 (−53.3)	−46.3 (−51.3)	−41.6 (−42.9)	−24.4 (−11.9)	−5.1 (22.8)	−2.0 (28.4)	−3.3 (26.1)	−9.5 (14.9)	−32.4 (−26.3)	−39.8 (−39.6)	−46.1 (−51.0)	−48.4 (−55.1)
Record low wind chill	−57.2	−54.8	−55.1	−49.5	−28.2	−13.2	−3.1	−6.8	−17.0	−36.7	−45.2	−53.0	−57.2
Average relative humidity (%) (at 1500 LST)	77.8	73.3	59.3	49.5	46.6	46.7	48.7	57.0	63.7	80.7	85.8	81.0	64.2
Source: Environment and Climate Change Canada Canadian Climate Normals 1991–2020

== See also ==
- List of municipalities in the Northwest Territories
- Whatì Airport
- Whatì Water Aerodrome
