= Wha Ti First Nation =

First Nations band government in Canada

- Band No. 769
- People: Tłı̨chǫ
- Treaty: Treaty 11; Tłı̨chǫ Agreement
- Headquarters: Whatì
- Territory: Northwest Territories

Population (2019)
- On other land: 635
- Off reserve: 46
- Total population: 681

Government
- Chief: Alfonz Nitsiza

Tribal Council
- Tłı̨chǫ Government

The Wha Ti First Nation is a Tłı̨chǫ First Nations band government in the Northwest Territories. The band's main community is Whatì, known before 1996 as Lac La Martre and before 2005 as Wha Ti, where 635 of its 681 members live.

In 2005, Wha Ti became part of the Tłı̨chǫ Government, and collectively holds title to 39,000 square kilometers of Tłı̨chǫ land. The new Whatì Community Government has assumed most of the band's powers and responsibilities. However, the federal government still recognizes Wha Ti for Indian Act enrollment purposes.
