= Wekweètì =

- First Nation
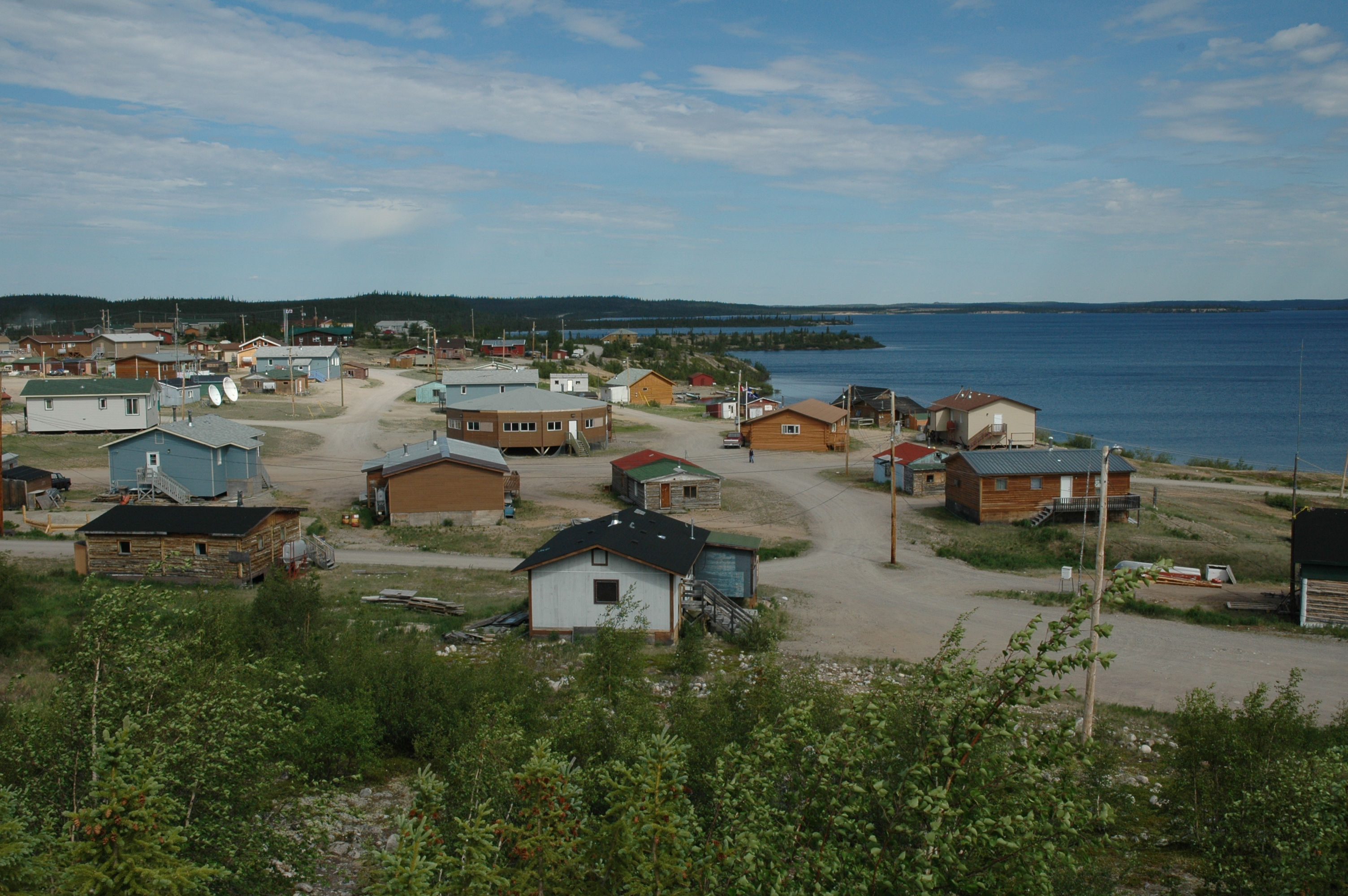

- Location within Northwest Territories Location within Canada
- Coordinates: 64°11′25″N 114°10′58″W
- Country: Canada
- Territory: Northwest Territories
- Region: North Slave
- Constituency: Monfwi
- Permanent community: 1962
- Incorporated: 4 August 2005

Government
  - Chief: Adeline Football
  - Community Officer: Fred Behrens
  - MLA: Jane Weyallon Armstrong

Area
  - Land: 14.70 km^{2} (5.68 sq mi)
- Elevation: 368 m (1,207 ft)

Population (2016)
  - Total: 129
  - Density: 8.8/km^{2} (23/sq mi)
- Time zone: UTC−06:00 (Northwest Territories Time)
- Canadian Postal code: X0E 1W0
- Area code: 867
- Telephone exchange: 713
- Food price index: 144.8^{A}
- Sources: Department of Municipal and Community Affairs, Prince of Wales Northern Heritage Centre, Canada Flight Supplement^A2015 figure based on Yellowknife = 100

Wekweètì (/wɛkˈweɪti/; from the Dogrib language meaning "rock lakes"), officially the Tłı̨chǫ Community Government of Wekweètì is a community in the North Slave Region of the Northwest Territories, Canada. Wekweètì is a Tłı̨chǫ (Dogrib Dene) aboriginal community and is located 195 km (121 mi) north of Yellowknife. It has no year-round road access but does have a winter ice road connection; the majority of transportation to and from the community is through the Wekweètì Airport. Wekweètì is the closest community to the Ekati Diamond Mine on the border with Nunavut. Wekweètì is part of the Tlicho Government.

== History ==
The area is within the traditional territory of the Tłı̨chǫ (Dogrib) First Nation and was a popular hunting camp prior to permanent settlement. In the 1960s, Dene elders around Behchokǫ̀ decided to return to the land and establish traditional camps in the bush. Wekweètì was established during this time, although in more recent years it too has become a modern community with essential services of its own. The community was formerly known as Snare Lake until 1 November 1998; prior to 4 August 2005 the community name used the spelling Wekweti.

Before 2005, the community was unincorporated, and local governance was provided by a First Nations band government, Dechi Laot'i First Nations. Under the terms of the Tłı̨chǫ Agreement, most responsibilities of Dechi Laot'i have been transferred to a new Wekweètì Community Government. However, Dechi Laot'i is still recognized by the federal government for Indian Act enrollment.

== Demographics ==
Federal census population history of Wekweètì
Year	Pop.	±%
1981	69	—
1986	119	+72.5%
1991	127	+6.7%
1996	135	+6.3%
2001	131	−3.0%
2006	137	+4.6%
2011	141	+2.9%
2016	129	−8.5%
2021	109	−15.5%
Source: Statistics Canada

Annual population estimates

Year	Pop.	±%
1996	146	—
1997	135	−7.5%
1998	138	+2.2%
1999	138	+0.0%
2000	142	+2.9%
2001	138	−2.8%
2002	142	+2.9%
2003	151	+6.3%
2004	139	−7.9%
2005	140	+0.7%
2006	142	+1.4%

Year	Pop.	±%
2007	142	+0.0%
2008	143	+0.7%
2009	145	+1.4%
2010	145	+0.0%
2011	145	+0.0%
2012	142	−2.1%
2013	143	+0.7%
2014	142	−0.7%
2015	146	+2.8%
2016	142	−2.7%
2017	136	−4.2%

Sources: NWT Bureau of Statistics (2001 - 2017)

In the 2021 Census of Population conducted by Statistics Canada, Wekweètì had a population of 109 living in 29 of its 55 total private dwellings, a change of −15.5% from its 2016 population of 129. With a land area of 14.71 km^{2} (5.68 sq mi), it had a population density of 7.4/km^{2} (19.2/sq mi) in 2021.

The majority of the population are First Nations and languages are Dogrib and English.

== Services ==
Alexis Arrowmaker School is Wekweètì's Elementary/Junior School and was rebuilt in 1994. The school is named after Alexis Arrowmaker, one of the signers of Treaty 11. The community has a store, Hozila Naedik'e General Store, a ten-bed hotel/lodge, Wekweeti Hotel/Snare Lake Lodge, a health centre, a community learning centre but no Royal Canadian Mounted Police detachment.

== Climate ==
Wekweeti has a subarctic climate (Dfc) with mild to warm summers with cool nights and long, severely cold winters.

Wekweètì

Climate chart (precipitation, max. and min. temperature)
J	F	M	A	M	J	J	A	S	O	N	D
0 −25 −25	0 −25 −25	0 −19 −25	0 −5 −16	0 11 −2	0 19 8	0 23 9	0 19 7	0 8 3	0 −7 −11	0 −18 −19	0 −22 −24
- █ Average max. and min. temperatures in °C
- █ Precipitation totals in mm
- Source: Note: rainfall is not entered
Imperial conversion
J	F	M	A	M	J	J	A	S	O	N	D
0 −13 −13	0 −13 −13	0 −2 −13	0 23 3	0 52 28	0 66 46	0 73 48	0 66 45	0 46 37	0 19 12	0 0 −2	0 −8 −11
- █ Average max. and min. temperatures in °F
- █ Precipitation totals in inches

== See also ==
- List of municipalities in the Northwest Territories
