= North Slave Region =

- Administrative region
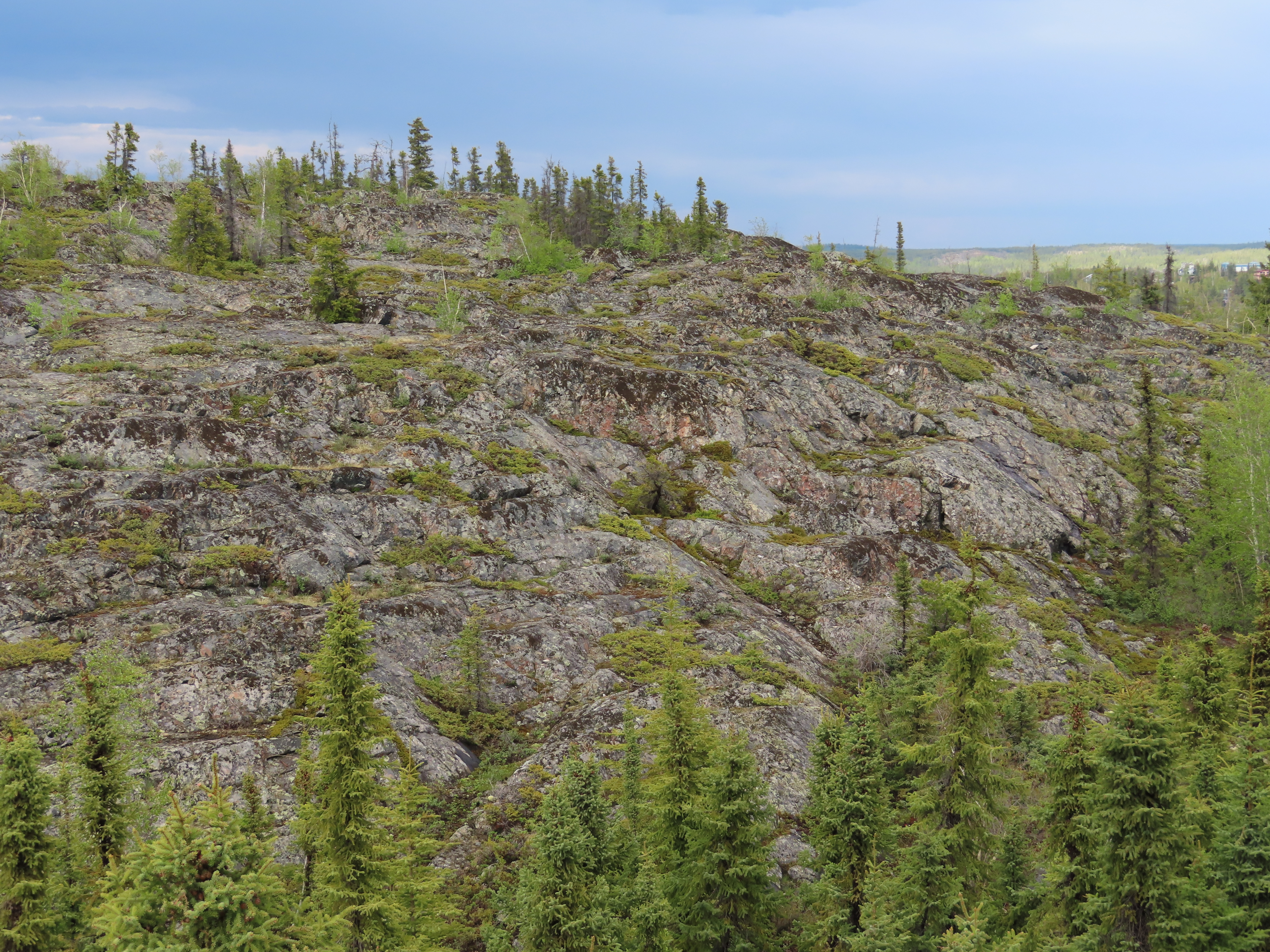
- Canadian Shield in Yellowknife

- Location within the Northwest Territories
- Country: Canada
- Territory: Northwest Territories
- Federal riding: Northwest Territories
- Territorial ridings: Monfwi; Tu Nedhé-Wiilideh Yellowknife: Frame Lake; Great Slave; Kam Lake; Range Lake; Yellowknife Centre; Yellowknife North; Yellowknife South
- Regional offices: Yellowknife; Behchokǫ̀ (sub-office)

Population (2021)
  - Total: 23,515
  - Rank: 1st NWT
  - % change (from 2016): 2.86
- Time zone: UTC−07:00 (MST)
  - Summer (DST): UTC−06:00 (MDT)
- Highways: Highway 3 (Yellowknife Highway); Highway 4 (Ingraham Trail)

North Slave Region communities in the Northwest Territories

The North Slave Region or Tłicho Region is one of five administrative regions in the Northwest Territories of Canada. It is the most populous of the five regions, with a population of almost 23,000. According to Municipal and Community Affairs, the region consists of eight communities; the regional office is located in Yellowknife and a sub-office is in Behchokǫ̀. With the exception of Yellowknife, the communities are predominantly First Nations.

== Communities ==
The North Slave Region includes the following communities:

Communities of the North Slave Region
Community				Demographics (2021)					
Name		Governance		Census		Indigenous population profile			
Official	Traditional	Type	Municipality	Total	Change (from 2016)	First Nations	Métis	Inuit	Other
Behchokǫ̀		Tłı̨chǫ community government	Yes	1,746	-6.8%	1,605	50	10	230
Dettah	T'èɂehda	Designated authority	No	192	-12.3%	170	10	10	15
Gamèti		Tłı̨chǫ community government	Yes	252	-9.4%	240	0	0	15
Łutselk'e		Designated authority	No	333	9.8%	175	115	0	155
Ndilǫ		Yellowknives community	No	Included in Yellowknife					
Wekweètì		Tłı̨chǫ community government	Yes	109	-15.5%	100	10	0	10
Whatì		Tłı̨chǫ community government	Yes	543	15.5%	510	0	0	50
Yellowknife	Sǫ̀mbak'è	City	Yes	20,340	3.9%	3,325	865	765 (Note: 195 Inuvialuit)	16,980

Historical population

Year	Pop.	±%
2001	21,037	—
2002	21,751	+3.4%
2003	22,613	+4.0%
2004	23,041	+1.9%
2005	23,091	+0.2%
2006	22,990	−0.4%
2007	23,157	+0.7%
2008	23,304	+0.6%
2009	23,133	−0.7%

Year	Pop.	±%
2010	23,199	+0.3%
2011	23,478	+1.2%
2012	23,595	+0.5%
2013	23,817	+0.9%
2014	23,955	+0.6%
2015	24,271	+1.3%
2016	24,588	+1.3%
2017	24,585	−0.0%

Sources: NWT Bureau of Statistics (2001 - 2017)

== Communities of the North Slave Region ==
Communities of the North Slave Region
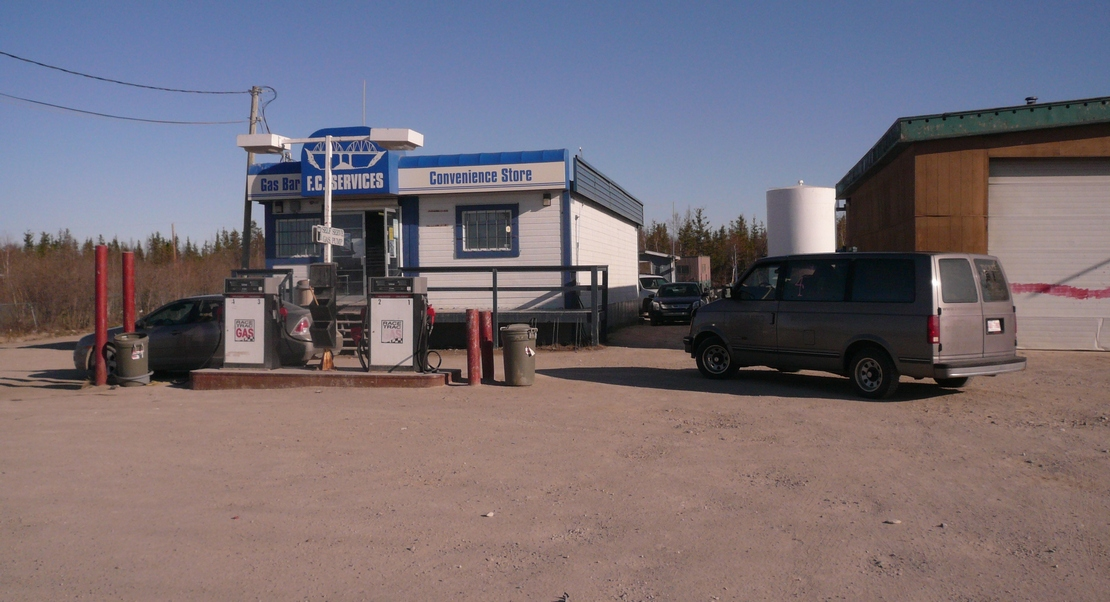
Gas station at Behchokǫ̀ (2009)

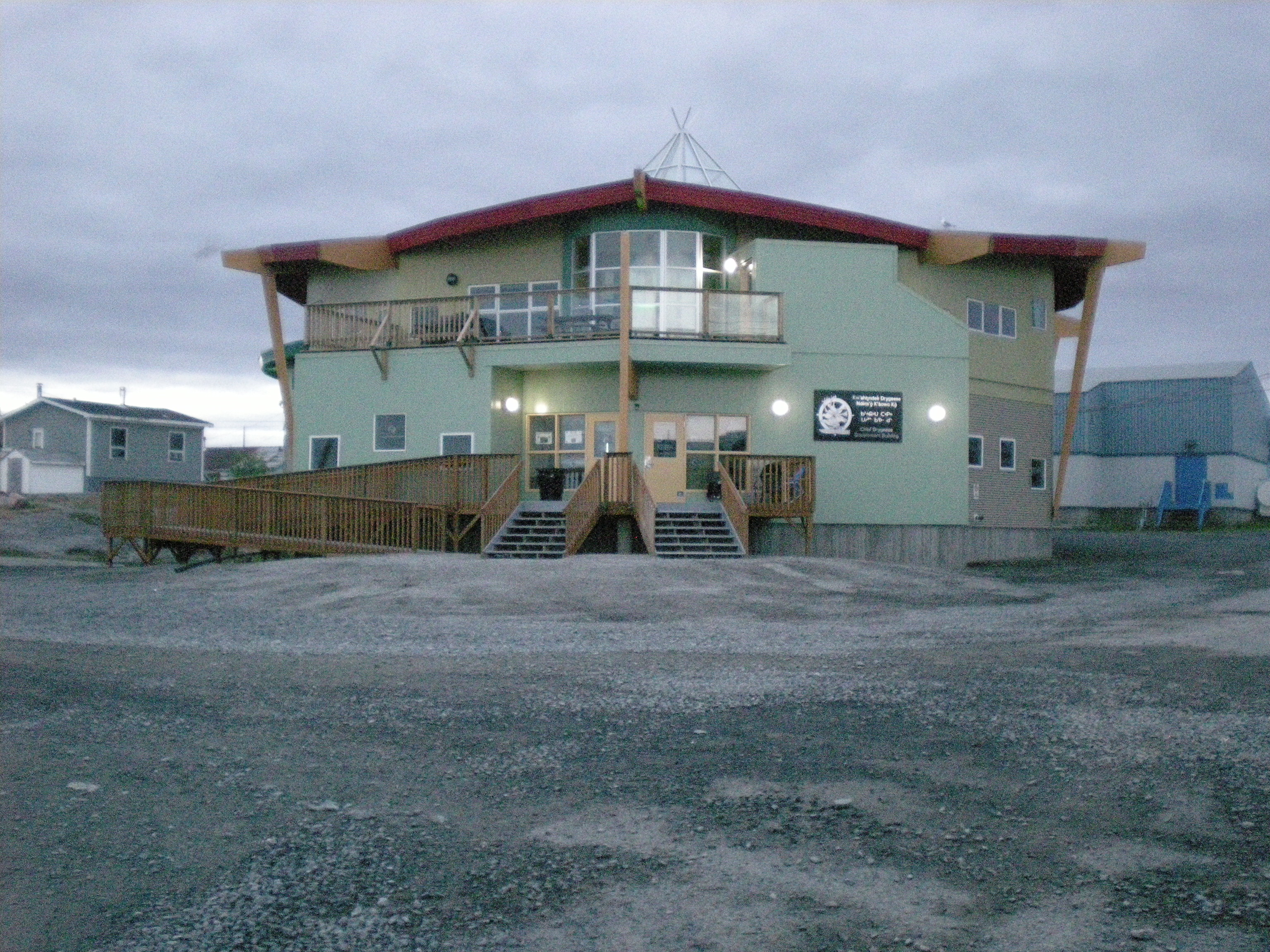
Dettah government building ((2011)

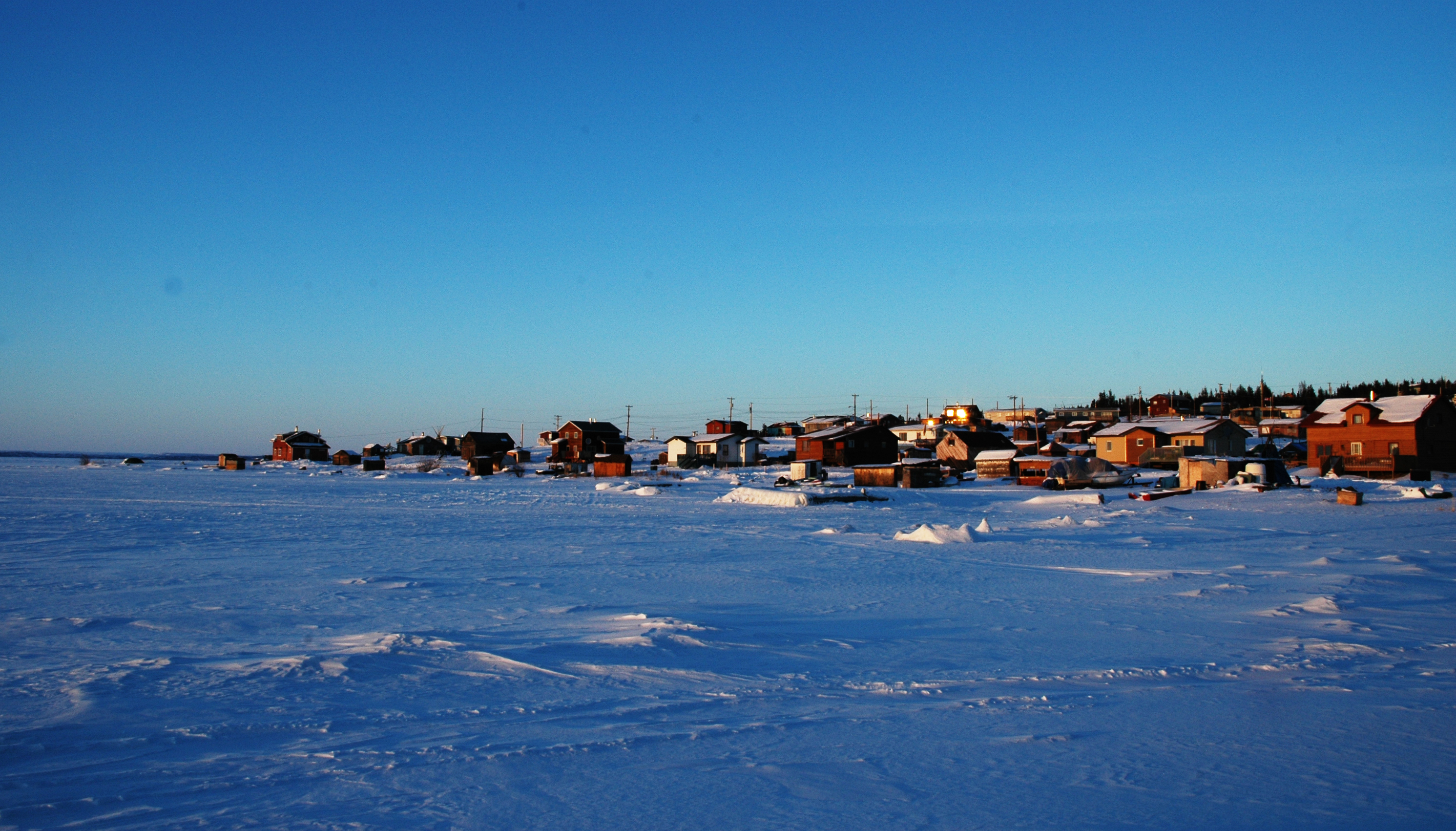
Łutselk'e ((2006)

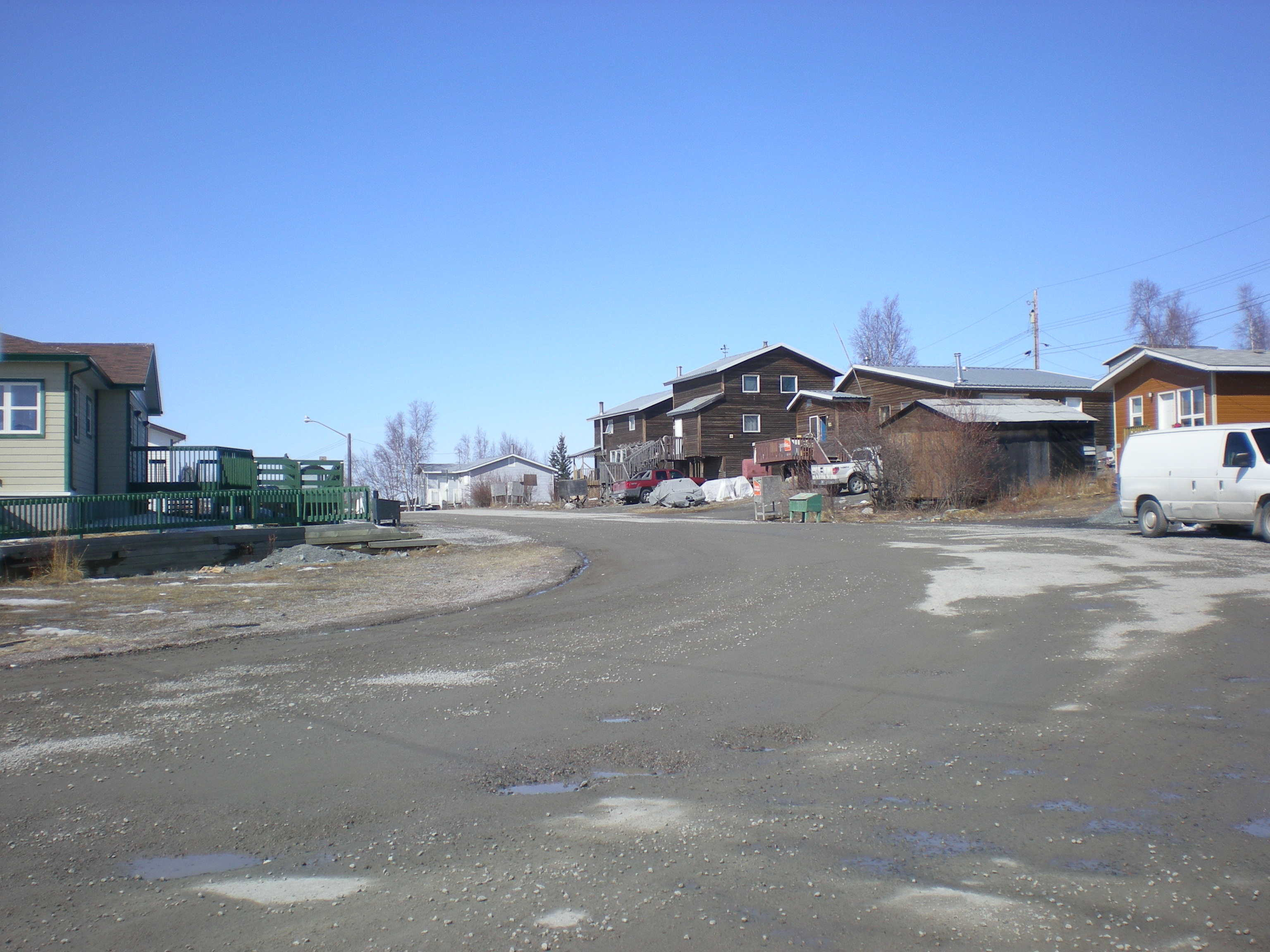
Ndilǫ street (2011)

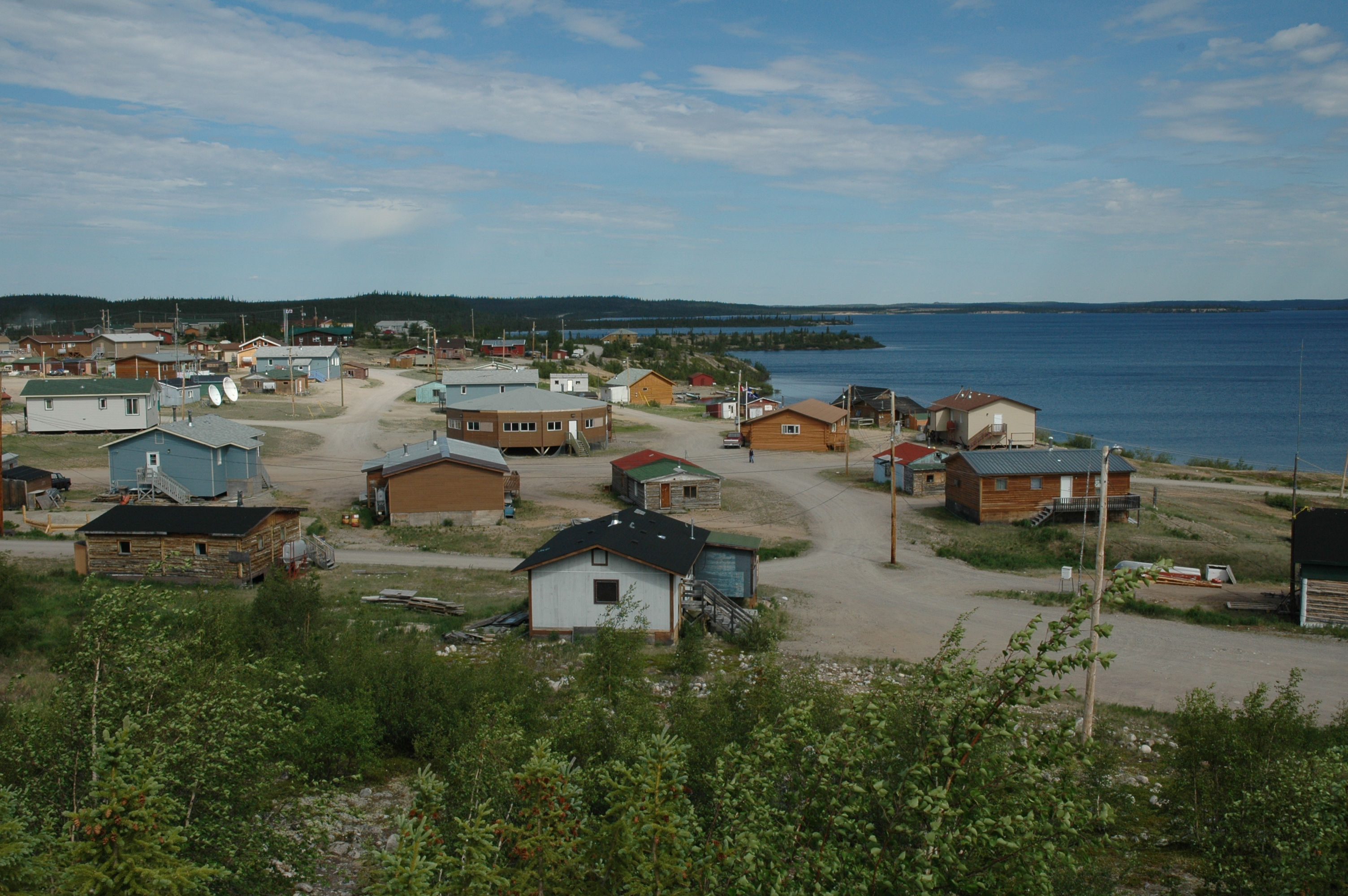
Wekweètì (2006)

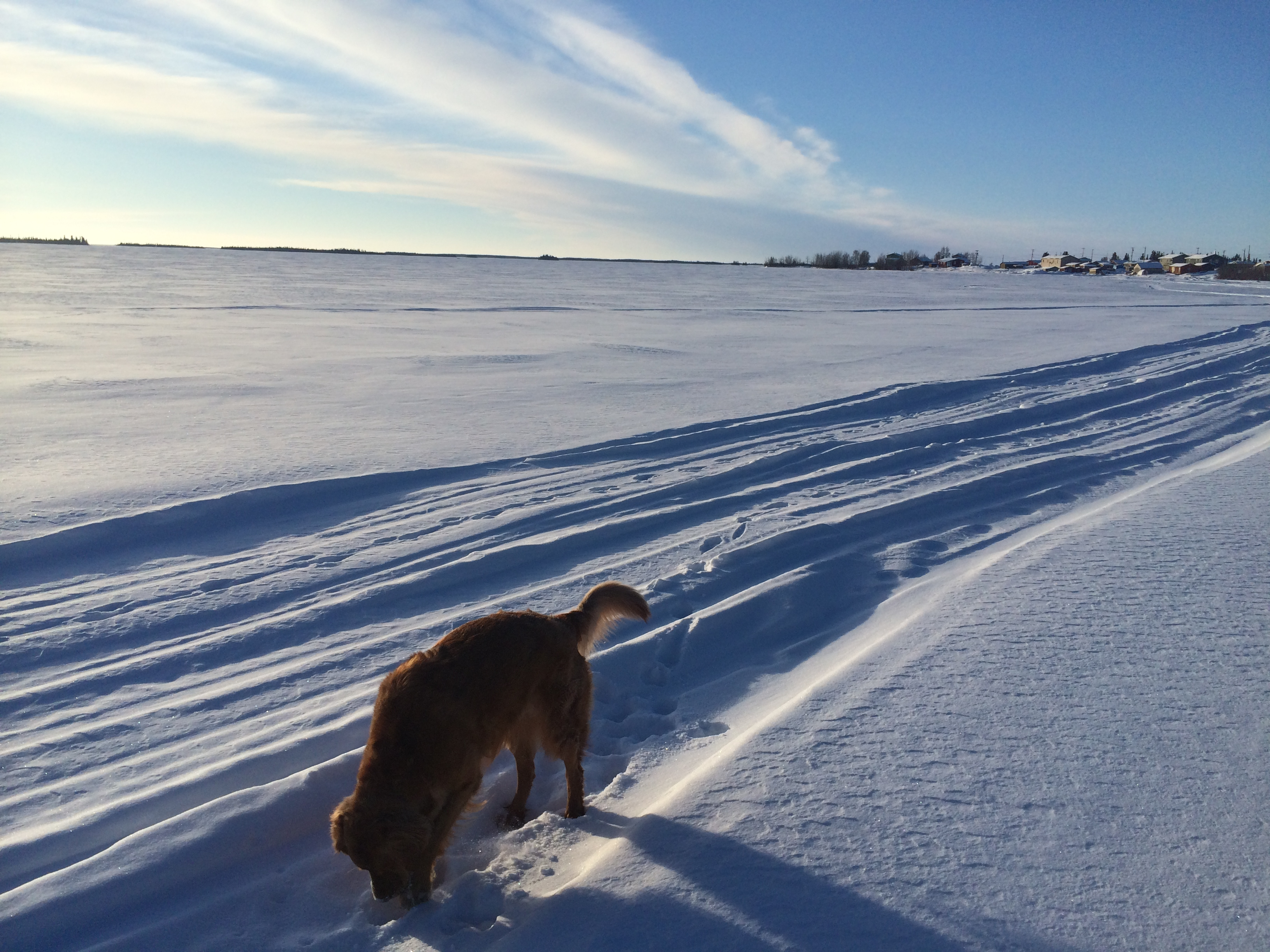
Trail near Whatì (2014)

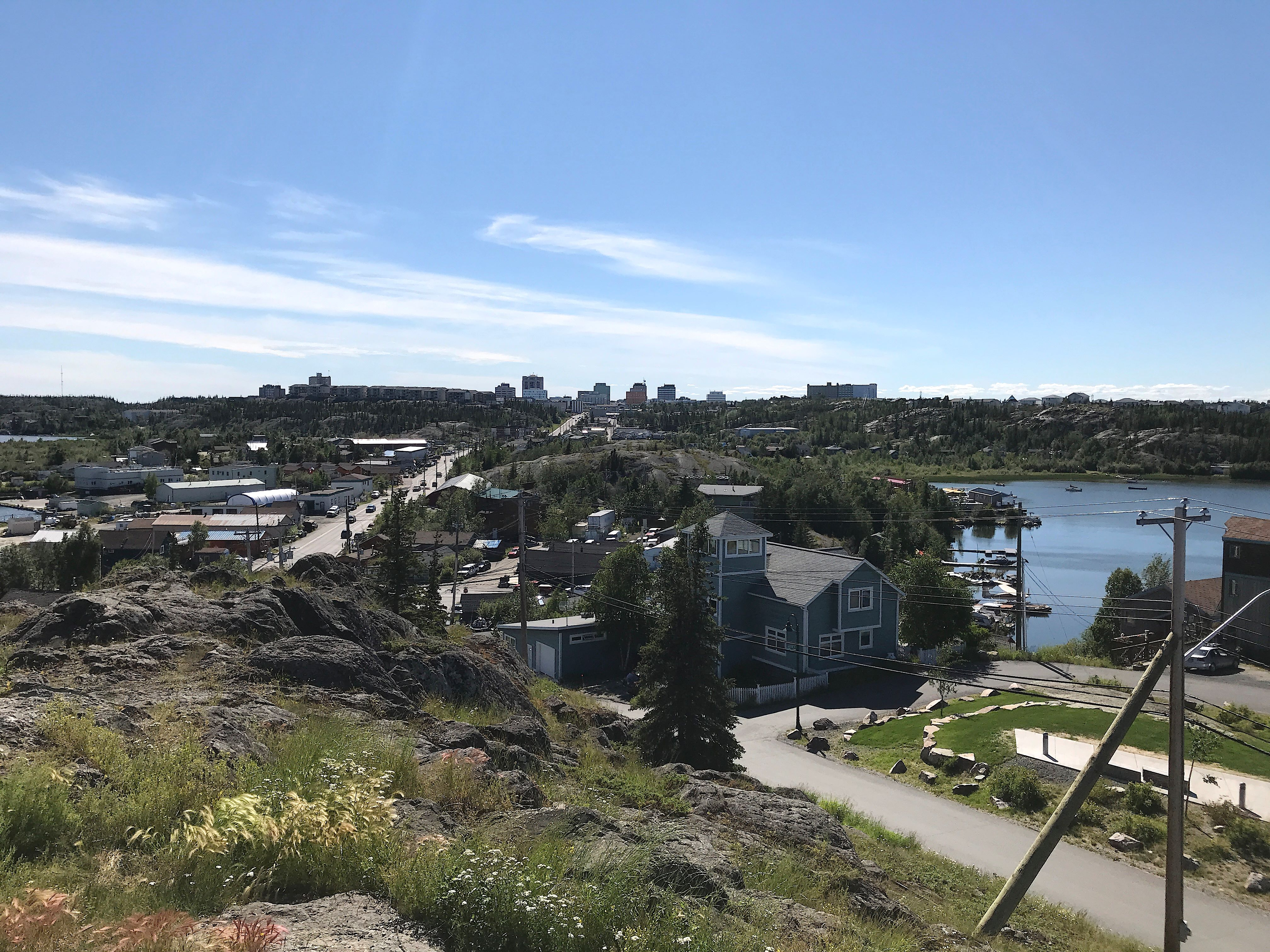
Looking towards downtown Yellowknife (2018)

== Climate ==
Climate data for Gamèti (Rae Lakes) Climate ID: 2203359; coordinates 64°06′43″N 117°19′41″W; elevation: 223.2 m (732 ft); 1981-2010 normals
Month	Jan	Feb	Mar	Apr	May	Jun	Jul	Aug	Sep	Oct	Nov	Dec	Year
Record high humidex	−1.1	−1.8	8.1	19.1	26.7	33.9	36.4	31.9	26.2	17.8	3.3	1.4	36.4
Record high °C (°F)	−0.8 (30.6)	−1.4 (29.5)	9.4 (48.9)	19.2 (66.6)	26.7 (80.1)	32.6 (90.7)	32.0 (89.6)	31.7 (89.1)	23.6 (74.5)	18.3 (64.9)	5.0 (41.0)	1.7 (35.1)	32.6 (90.7)
Mean daily maximum °C (°F)	−22.7 (−8.9)	−18.3 (−0.9)	−11.4 (11.5)	1.3 (34.3)	8.9 (48.0)	17.9 (64.2)	21.5 (70.7)	17.1 (62.8)	10.1 (50.2)	−0.2 (31.6)	−11.0 (12.2)	−17.1 (1.2)	−0.3 (31.5)
Daily mean °C (°F)	−27.1 (−16.8)	−23.6 (−10.5)	−18.5 (−1.3)	−5.9 (21.4)	3.4 (38.1)	12.9 (55.2)	16.8 (62.2)	13.2 (55.8)	7.0 (44.6)	−2.7 (27.1)	−14.5 (5.9)	−21.5 (−6.7)	−5.0 (23.0)
Mean daily minimum °C (°F)	−31.5 (−24.7)	−28.9 (−20.0)	−25.4 (−13.7)	−13.1 (8.4)	−2.2 (28.0)	7.9 (46.2)	12.2 (54.0)	9.2 (48.6)	3.8 (38.8)	−5.2 (22.6)	−18.1 (−0.6)	−25.9 (−14.6)	−9.8 (14.4)
Record low °C (°F)	−51.5 (−60.7)	−47.8 (−54.0)	−46.6 (−51.9)	−35.5 (−31.9)	−22.3 (−8.1)	−1.0 (30.2)	−0.1 (31.8)	−1.0 (30.2)	−7.7 (18.1)	−28.1 (−18.6)	−41.3 (−42.3)	−47.1 (−52.8)	−51.5 (−60.7)
Record low wind chill	−53.6	−60.4	−51.5	−43.3	−30.7	−6.1	0.0	0.0	−13.4	−33.3	−45.4	−53.0	−60.4
Average relative humidity (%) (at 1500 LST)	73.2	72.3	60.5	54.0	50.4	45.7	49.6	59.8	69.6	79.5	84.3	80.9	65.0
Source: Environment and Climate Change Canada

Climate data for Yellowknife (Yellowknife Airport) WMO ID: 71936; coordinates 62°27′46″N 114°26′25″W; elevation: 205.7 m (675 ft); 1991–2020 normals, extremes 1942–present
Month	Jan	Feb	Mar	Apr	May	Jun	Jul	Aug	Sep	Oct	Nov	Dec	Year
Record high humidex	2.9	6.1	8.9	20.2	28.5	34.0	35.4	34.3	27.2	18.1	6.3	1.6	35.4
Record high °C (°F)	3.4 (38.1)	6.2 (43.2)	9.3 (48.7)	20.4 (68.7)	28.5 (83.3)	31.1 (88.0)	32.5 (90.5)	32.6 (90.7)	26.1 (79.0)	19.0 (66.2)	7.8 (46.0)	2.8 (37.0)	32.6 (90.7)
Mean maximum °C (°F)	−7.3 (18.9)	−5.8 (21.6)	2.8 (37.0)	11.7 (53.1)	21.2 (70.2)	26.8 (80.2)	27.9 (82.2)	26.4 (79.5)	19.4 (66.9)	9.6 (49.3)	0.7 (33.3)	−4.8 (23.4)	29.0 (84.2)
Mean daily maximum °C (°F)	−21.6 (−6.9)	−18.0 (−0.4)	−10.6 (12.9)	0.3 (32.5)	10.4 (50.7)	18.6 (65.5)	21.5 (70.7)	18.4 (65.1)	10.9 (51.6)	1.5 (34.7)	−9.0 (15.8)	−18.0 (−0.4)	0.4 (32.7)
Daily mean °C (°F)	−25.5 (−13.9)	−22.7 (−8.9)	−16.6 (2.1)	−5.5 (22.1)	5.3 (41.5)	13.8 (56.8)	17.1 (62.8)	14.5 (58.1)	7.6 (45.7)	−1.0 (30.2)	−12.6 (9.3)	−21.8 (−7.2)	−4.0 (24.8)
Mean daily minimum °C (°F)	−29.4 (−20.9)	−27.4 (−17.3)	−22.5 (−8.5)	−11.3 (11.7)	0.1 (32.2)	9.0 (48.2)	12.6 (54.7)	10.5 (50.9)	4.2 (39.6)	−3.6 (25.5)	−16.2 (2.8)	−25.6 (−14.1)	−8.3 (17.1)
Mean minimum °C (°F)	−41.0 (−41.8)	−39.1 (−38.4)	−36.8 (−34.2)	−26.0 (−14.8)	−9.4 (15.1)	2.1 (35.8)	7.4 (45.3)	4.1 (39.4)	−2.3 (27.9)	−14.1 (6.6)	−29.6 (−21.3)	−38.4 (−37.1)	−42.2 (−44.0)
Record low °C (°F)	−51.2 (−60.2)	−51.2 (−60.2)	−43.3 (−45.9)	−40.6 (−41.1)	−22.8 (−9.0)	−4.4 (24.1)	0.6 (33.1)	−0.6 (30.9)	−9.7 (14.5)	−28.9 (−20.0)	−44.4 (−47.9)	−48.3 (−54.9)	−51.2 (−60.2)
Record low wind chill	−64.0	−61.0	−56.8	−53.2	−31.8	−11.2	0.0	−4.8	−16.4	−36.3	−54.7	−58.9	−64.0
Average precipitation mm (inches)	15.0 (0.59)	11.0 (0.43)	14.1 (0.56)	11.6 (0.46)	16.3 (0.64)	28.9 (1.14)	40.4 (1.59)	44.0 (1.73)	43.0 (1.69)	28.8 (1.13)	25.8 (1.02)	15.1 (0.59)	293.9 (11.57)
Average rainfall mm (inches)	0.0 (0.0)	0.0 (0.0)	0.2 (0.01)	2.9 (0.11)	12.2 (0.48)	28.0 (1.10)	40.4 (1.59)	44.0 (1.73)	39.9 (1.57)	12.0 (0.47)	0.5 (0.02)	0.0 (0.0)	180.2 (7.09)
Average snowfall cm (inches)	21.7 (8.5)	16.1 (6.3)	19.2 (7.6)	9.9 (3.9)	4.5 (1.8)	0.0 (0.0)	0.0 (0.0)	0.0 (0.0)	3.0 (1.2)	20.1 (7.9)	36.9 (14.5)	23.7 (9.3)	155.0 (61.0)
Average precipitation days (≥ 0.2 mm)	11.1	9.3	8.6	4.8	5.7	7.0	9.5	11.2	12.2	13.7	14.6	11.5	119.1
Average rainy days (≥ 0.2 mm)	0.09	0.04	0.25	1.2	4.4	6.8	9.5	11.2	11.6	5.8	0.82	0.13	51.9
Average snowy days (≥ 0.2 cm)	12.4	10.3	9.5	4.1	1.9	0.04	0.0	0.0	1.2	9.6	16.0	13.2	78.2
Average relative humidity (%) (at 15:00 LST)	68.5	64.6	56.4	52.8	46.0	45.3	49.0	57.1	64.7	75.9	80.7	73.0	61.2
Average dew point °C (°F)	−28.9 (−20.0)	−26.6 (−15.9)	−21.6 (−6.9)	−11.6 (11.1)	−3.1 (26.4)	4.6 (40.3)	8.8 (47.8)	8.4 (47.1)	3.4 (38.1)	−3.7 (25.3)	−14.8 (5.4)	−25.0 (−13.0)	−9.1 (15.6)
Mean monthly sunshine hours	50.6	107.3	188.4	276.4	335.7	373.8	358.0	276.2	157.7	65.0	42.7	24.6	2,256.5
Percentage possible sunshine	26.8	43.5	51.8	62.2	60.8	63.0	61.2	55.5	40.3	21.0	20.2	15.4	43.5
Average ultraviolet index	0	0	1	2	4	5	5	4	2	1	0	0	2
Source 1: Environment and Climate Change Canada (sun 1981–2010) (May maximum} (August maximum)
Source 2: Weather Atlas (dew point, mean maximum, and mean minimum)

Climate data for Whatì WMO ID: 71163; Climate ID: 2202678; coordinates 63°08′01″N 117°14′41″W; elevation: 271.3 m (890 ft); 1991–2020 normals, extremes 1974–present
Month	Jan	Feb	Mar	Apr	May	Jun	Jul	Aug	Sep	Oct	Nov	Dec	Year
Record high humidex	3.9	6.5	12.7	17.1	29.1	37.7	36.8	35.2	32.3	17.8	5.4	6.1	37.7
Record high °C (°F)	4.1 (39.4)	7.0 (44.6)	13.1 (55.6)	19.6 (67.3)	29.1 (84.4)	33.6 (92.5)	33.7 (92.7)	34.4 (93.9)	30.9 (87.6)	18.0 (64.4)	5.6 (42.1)	6.3 (43.3)	34.4 (93.9)
Mean daily maximum °C (°F)	−20.6 (−5.1)	−16.9 (1.6)	−10.3 (13.5)	1.3 (34.3)	11.7 (53.1)	19.5 (67.1)	22.4 (72.3)	18.8 (65.8)	11.8 (53.2)	0.8 (33.4)	−10.2 (13.6)	−18.1 (−0.6)	0.9 (33.6)
Daily mean °C (°F)	−25.1 (−13.2)	−22.6 (−8.7)	−17.6 (0.3)	−6.0 (21.2)	5.6 (42.1)	13.5 (56.3)	16.4 (61.5)	13.1 (55.6)	6.9 (44.4)	−2.5 (27.5)	−14.4 (6.1)	−22.5 (−8.5)	−4.6 (23.7)
Mean daily minimum °C (°F)	−29.4 (−20.9)	−28.2 (−18.8)	−24.9 (−12.8)	−13.4 (7.9)	−0.5 (31.1)	7.4 (45.3)	10.4 (50.7)	7.4 (45.3)	1.9 (35.4)	−5.7 (21.7)	−18.6 (−1.5)	−26.9 (−16.4)	−10.0 (14.0)
Record low °C (°F)	−48.4 (−55.1)	−47.4 (−53.3)	−46.3 (−51.3)	−41.6 (−42.9)	−24.4 (−11.9)	−5.1 (22.8)	−2.0 (28.4)	−3.3 (26.1)	−9.5 (14.9)	−32.4 (−26.3)	−39.8 (−39.6)	−46.1 (−51.0)	−48.4 (−55.1)
Record low wind chill	−57.2	−54.8	−55.1	−49.5	−28.2	−13.2	−3.1	−6.8	−17.0	−36.7	−45.2	−53.0	−57.2
Average relative humidity (%) (at 1500 LST)	77.8	73.3	59.3	49.5	46.6	46.7	48.7	57.0	63.7	80.7	85.8	81.0	64.2
Source: Environment and Climate Change Canada
