= Area code 867 =

Telephone area code for the Canadian territories

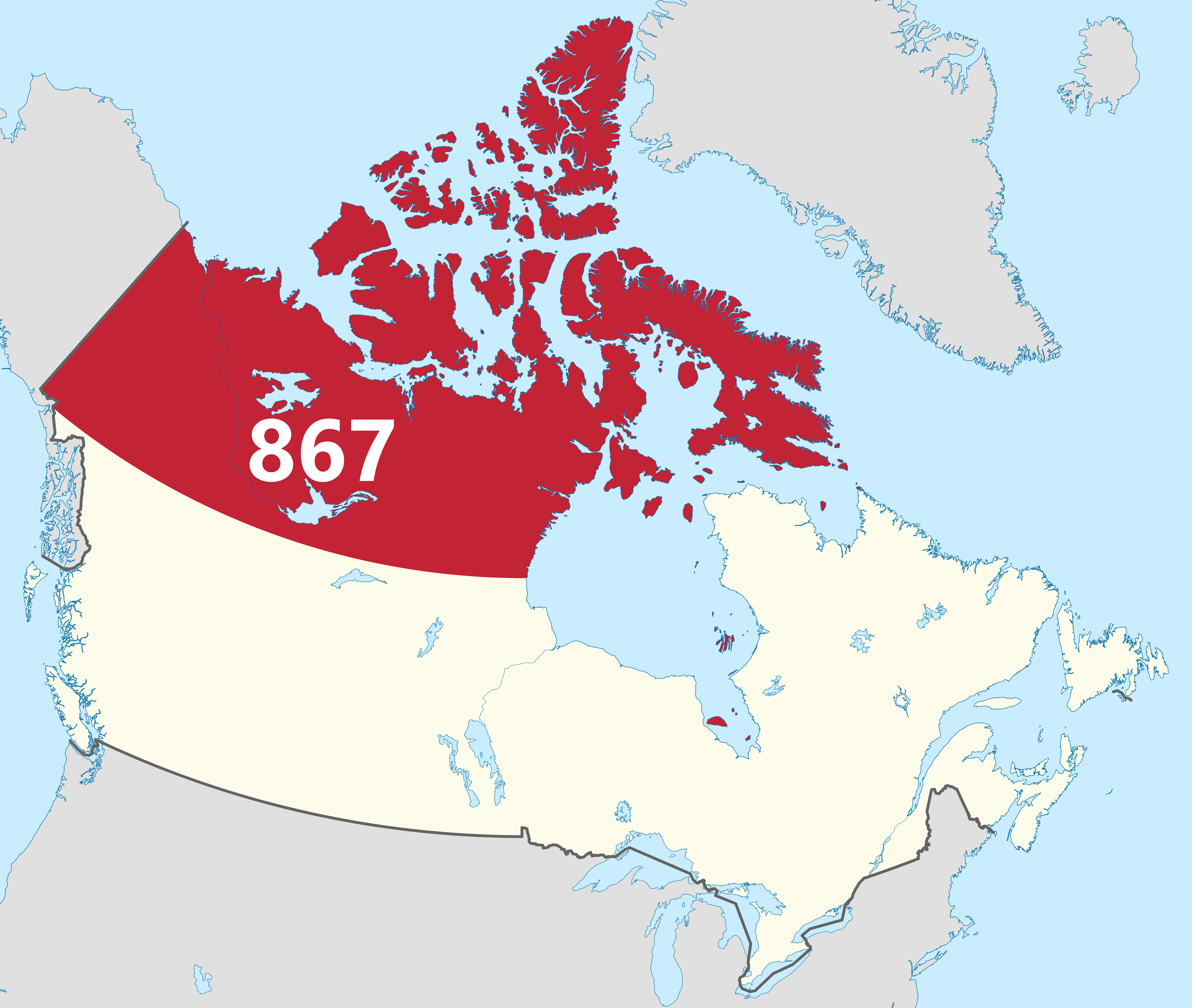
Canada's numbering plan area 867

Area code 867 is the telephone area code in the North American Numbering Plan (NANP) for the three Canadian territories, all of which are in Northern Canada. The area code was created on October 21, 1997, for a new numbering plan area (NPA) established from combining regions that had been served by area code 403 and area code 819. As the least populated NPA in mainland North America, serving about 130,000 people, it is geographically the largest, with Alaska (907) a distant second.

The numbering plan area is adjacent to seven provinces (Alberta, British Columbia, Manitoba, Newfoundland and Labrador, Ontario, Saskatchewan, and Quebec) and one U.S. state (Alaska), as well as Greenland and Russia (across the North Pole), more jurisdictions than any other in North America. It is also one of two Canadian area codes that are not part of an overlay numbering plan, the other being 807.

The incumbent local exchange carrier for area code 867 is Northwestel, a subsidiary of BCE. Until 1964, the geographic area served today by 867 had up to five independent telephone companies, and by Bell Canada.

== History ==
In 1947, Alberta was assigned area code 403 in the first continent-wide telephone numbering plan by the American Telephone and Telegraph Company (AT&T). When service became available from local regional carriers, individual locations in Yukon and the west of the Northwest Territories were served via the area code of the carrier. These companies were eventually merged into Canadian National Telecommunications, a subsidiary of the Canadian National Railway. CNT's operations in the territories became Northwestel in 1979.

The eastern Northwest Territories were among the last areas of North America without telephone service. When the area code system was created, the region was effectively served by western Quebec's area code 514. In 1957, those non-diallable areas were reassigned to eastern Quebec's area code 418. Bell Canada introduced telephone service in the eastern Northwest Territories in 1958. As direct distance dialing (DDD) was rolled out in this area in the 1970s, the eastern Northwest Territories and a large swath of northwestern Quebec were reassigned to western Quebec's area code 819. Bell Canada sold its northern service territory to Northwestel in 1992. In 1993, Bell Communications Research, functioning as the North American Numbering Plan Administration listed the vast majority of the territories with area code 403.

Until area code 867 was created, area codes 403 and 819 had been geographically the two largest in the North American Numbering Plan. The area code commenced service on October 21, 1997. Since its creation, all of the former 819 portion of the Northwest Territories, as well as the portion of the former 403 portion covering five exchanges, has become part of Nunavut. The split reduced area code 403 for service of Alberta only.

All existing central office prefixes, with one exception, were retained in the change to area code 867. An assignment conflict between 403-979 at Inuvik and 819-979 at Iqaluit was resolved by changing Inuvik from 403-979 to 867-777. A minor programming error allowed for a few weeks late in 1997 callers in the Inuvik area to dial 403-777 and reach Inuvik when they actually should have routed to Calgary, which appeared on customer's bills, along with the higher rate.

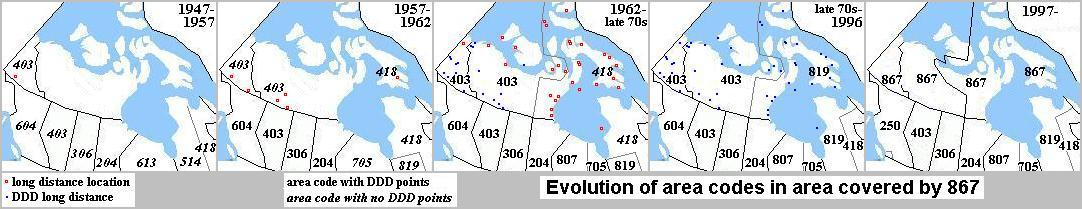
Evolution of area codes in northern territories

Northwestel's proposal for a new regulatory regime was approved for 2007 to allow resale of local telephone service, but no competitors entered the market to avail themselves of the resale option. In 2011, facilities-based local service competition was approved by the Canadian Radio-television and Telecommunications Commission (CRTC) and so additional central office codes are now required for competitive carriers wishing to offer local service. The expense limits deployment so far to Whitehorse, Yellowknife, Inuvik, Behchokǫ̀, Aklavik and Hay River, four of which already have multiple prefixes. Communities that now have only one prefix are not likely to need a second prefix other than for local growth or the entry of a competitor (as in Aklavik and the twin Behchokǫ̀ communities, Rae-Edzo (Note: Behchokǫ̀ has two separate exchange areas, each with its own prefix, but Iristel's 292 prefix is overlaid, with both using independent facilities)).

The sparsely populated area is unlikely to exhaust telephone numbers in the foreseeable future.

in June 2021, the CRTC recommended implementing the three-digit code 9-8-8 for the nationwide suicide prevention hotline. The CRTC decision followed the decision of the US Federal Communications Commission to adopt 9-8-8 as the number for the National Suicide Prevention Lifeline. 988 was already in use as a local exchange in the Yellowknife area, which would require ten-digit dialing in area code 867. In August 2022, the CRTC finalized its implementation plans for 9-8-8, effective November 30, 2023; it accepted a request from Northwestel to make ten-digit dialing mandatory only in the Yellowknife area and optional elsewhere within the region as of May 31, 2023, in part because it would ease the process of communicating the transition to remote communities and in Indigenous languages.

== Numbering plan area ==
Area code 867 serves all points in the three Canadian territories, the Northwest Territories, Nunavut, and Yukon. It has the largest land area (3,921,739 km^{2} (1,514,192 sq mi)) of any area code in the NANP. The territorial extent reaches 3,173 km (1,972 mi) from Cape Dyer on Baffin Island to the Alaska border, and 4,391 km (2,728 mi) from the south end of James Bay to the North Pole. The largest distances between exchanges are 2,200 km (1,400 mi) from Sanikiluaq to Grise Fiord, and 3,365 km (2,091 mi) from Beaver Creek to Pangnirtung. Four different official time zones are observed within the area: Eastern, Central, Mountain, and Pacific.

Telephone numbers in NPA 867 are the most expensive geographic destinations in Canada. Iristel, the major CLEC in the region, bills subscribers in other area codes a 15¢/minute premium to call 867-numbers, and charges a $20/year premium to issue a 867-number in-region instead of assigning the same subscriber any other Canadian area code.

The digits of the area code were reportedly chosen to promote the theme "TOP of the world", as 867 spells TOP on a standard North American keypad. When combined with the NANP international dialing code 1, it spells 1867, which is the year of Canadian Confederation.

=== Exchanges ===
Some exchanges in the territories serve some customers in Fraser and Swan Lake, British Columbia (from Carcross and Swift River, respectively). Fitzgerald, Alberta, is served from Fort Smith, Northwest Territories. On a section of the Alaska Highway which crosses the BC-Yukon border six times in 9.7 km (6.0 mi), two highway lodges and area residents on the Yukon side are served by Watson Lake (867) numbers, not the nearer Lower Post (250) exchange.

- Aklavik, NT: 375, 978
- Arctic Bay, NU: 439
- Arviat, NU: 205, 232, 341, 857
- Baker Lake, NU: 793
- Beaver Creek, YT: 362 862
- Behchokǫ̀, NT: 292, 371, 392, 492, 731
- Cambridge Bay, NU: 391, 983
- Cape Dorset, NU: 897
- Carcross, YT: 733, 821
- Carmacks, YT: 385, 863
- Chesterfield Inlet, NU: 898
- Clyde River, NU: 924
- Colville Lake, NT: 709, 722
- Coral Harbour, NU: 925
- Dawson City, YT: 730, 991, 992, 993
- Délı̨nę, NT: 589, 744
- Destruction Bay, YT: 789, 841
- Ekati Diamond Mine, NT: 880
- Elsa, YT: 995
- Enterprise, NT: 984
- Faro, YT: 746 994
- Fort Good Hope, NT: 496, 598
- Fort Liard, NT: 770
- Fort McPherson, NT: 377, 952
- Fort Providence, NT: 373, 699
- Fort Resolution, NT: 376, 394
- Fort Simpson, NT: 695
- Fort Smith, NT: 621, 870, 872
- Gamèti, NT: 365, 997
- Gjoa Haven, NU: 360
- Grise Fiord, NU: 980
- Haines Junction, YT: 323, 634
- Hall Beach, NU: 928
- Hay River, NT: 775, 874, 875, 876
- Igloolik, NU: 201, 324, 934
- Inuvik, NT: 620, 678, 768, 777, 888
- Iqaluit, NU: 202, 222, 223, 794, 877, 974, 975, 979
- Jean Marie River, NT: 491, 809
- Kakisa, NT: 493, 825
- Kimmirut, NU: 939
- Kugaaruk, NU: 769
- Kugluktuk, NU: 982
- Łutselk'e, NT: 370, 785
- Marsh Lake, YT: 660
- Mayo, YT: 383, 996
- Nahanni Butte, NT: 364, 602
- Nanisivik, NU: 436
- Norman Wells, NT: 587
- Old Crow, YT: 325, 966
- Pangnirtung, NU: 473
- Paulatuk, NT: 580, 788
- Pelly Crossing, YT: 537
- Pond Inlet, NU: 899
- Qikiqtarjuaq, NU: 927
- Rankin Inlet, NU: 645
- Naujaat, NU: 462
- Resolute, NU: 252
- Ross River, YT: 747 969
- Sachs Harbour, NT: 690, 786
- Sambaa Kʼe, NT: 206
- Sanikiluaq, NU: 266
- Swift River, YT: 851
- Tagish, YT: 399 748
- Taloyoak, NU: 561
- Teslin, YT: 384, 390
- Tsiigehtchic, NT: 490, 953
- Tuktoyaktuk, NT: 340, 977
- Tulita, NT: 374, 588
- Ulukhaktok, NT: 396, 787
- Watson Lake, YT: 536, 749
- Wekweeti, NT: 713 745
- Whale Cove, NU: 896
- Whatì, NT: 494, 573
- Whitehorse, YT: 322, 332, 333, 334, 335, 336, 337, 393, 455, 456, 457, 465, 466, 467, 469, 470, 471, 632, 633, 667, 668, 689
- Wrigley, NT: 495, 581
- Yellowknife, NT: 200, 444, 445, 446, 447, 669, 675, 676, 677, 679, 680, 681, 682, 688, 765, 766, 767, 783, 873, 920, 988, 999
- Premium numbers: 976.

Ellesmere Island is the northernmost terrestrial point in Canada. On Ellesmere, conventional telephony is available at Grise Fiord (1-867-980-xxxx), population 130, but not at two remote government outposts further north: Eureka, Nunavut (80.1°N) is host to an Environment Canada weather station and Alert, Nunavut (82°N) is a Canadian Forces Station. The only outside communication to Eureka is via satellite; the weather station lists various extensions of an Ottawa 613 federal number, an Iridium satellite phone or the Winnipeg 204 number of a main Environment Canada office. As Eureka is at the northern limit of access to geosynchronous satellite signals, a string of military terrestrial UHF links extends the signal from "Fort Eureka" to CFS Alert. There is a skeleton crew at each location which is reachable by Internet or telephone, but these links are satellite or military communication and do not use the area code 867 infrastructure.

== See also ==
- Area code 600, a rarely used non-geographic prefix which includes caller-pays satellite telephony in the high Arctic
- Telephone numbers in Canada
- Canadian Numbering Administration Consortium

== Notes ==
Yukon, Northwest Territories and Nunavut area codes: 867
| | North: Arctic Ocean, Country code 7 (Russia) | |
| West: 907 | 867 | East: Atlantic Ocean, Country code 299 (Greenland) |
| | South: 204/431, 250/778/236/672, 306/639, 705/249, 709, 780/403/587/825/368, 807, 819/873 | |
Alaska area codes: 907
Alberta area codes: 403, 587/825/368, 780
British Columbia area codes: 250, 604, 236/257/672/778
Manitoba area codes: 204/431/584
Newfoundland and Labrador area codes: 709/879
Ontario area codes: 416/437/647/942, 519/226/548/382, 613/343/753, 705/249/683, 807, 905/289/365/742
Saskatchewan area codes: 306/474/639
Quebec area codes: 367/418/581, 354/450/579, 263/438/514, 468/819/873
