= Behchokǫ̀ =

Community in Northwest Territories, Canada

Behchokǫ̀ ᐯᐊᑋᐟᗱᒼᑯ Rae-Edzo
- Tłı̨chǫ Community Government
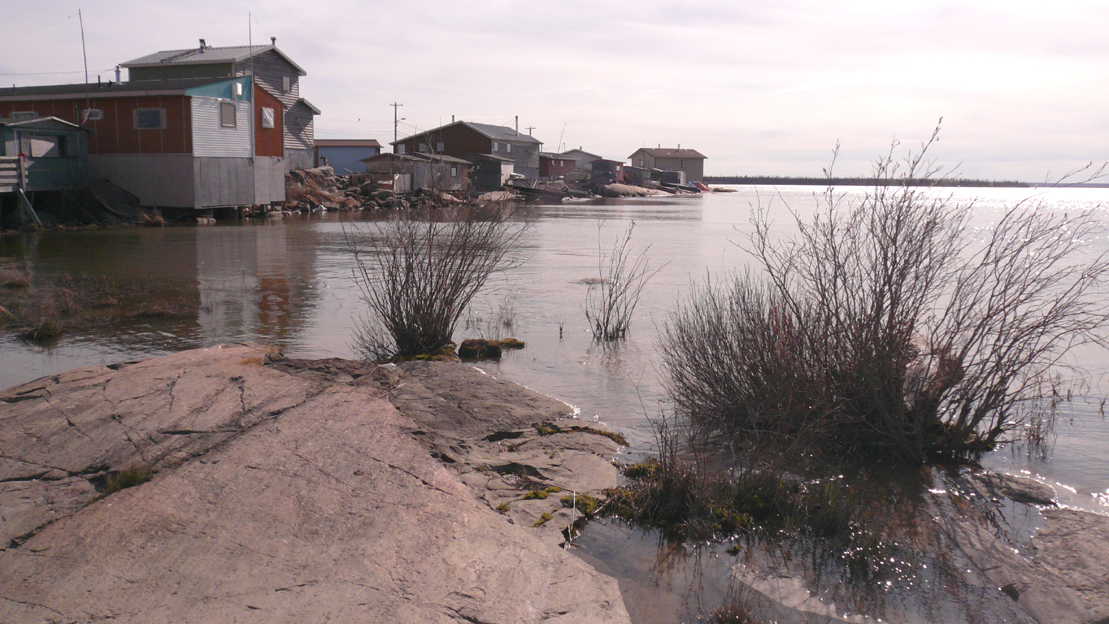
- Behchokǫ̀ on Great Slave Lake
- Motto: Strong like two people
- Location within Northwest Territories Location within Canada
- Coordinates: 62°48′09″N 116°02′47″W
- Country: Canada
- Territory: Northwest Territories
- Region: North Slave
- Constituency: Monfwi
- Tlicho Community Government: 4 August 2005

Government
  - Chief: Bertha Rabesca Zoe
  - Senior Administrative Officer: Pushp Seth
  - MLA for Monfwi: Jane Weyallon Armstrong

Area
  - Land: 75.17 km^{2} (29.02 sq mi)
- Elevation: 179 m (587 ft)

Population (2021)
  - Total: 1,746
  - Density: 23.23/km^{2} (60.2/sq mi)
- Time zone: UTC−06:00 (Northwest Territories Time)
- Canadian Postal code: X0E 0Y0
- Area code: 867
- Telephone exchange: 292, 371, 392
- Living cost: 127.5^{A}
- Food price index: 143.9^{B}
- Sources: Department of Municipal and Community Affairs, Prince of Wales Northern Heritage Centre, Canada Flight Supplement^A2013 figure based on Edmonton = 100^B2015 figure based on Yellowknife = 100 Elevation at the airport

Behchokǫ̀ ([bɛ́ht͡ʃʰókʰõ̀] or [bɛ́ht͡sʰókʰõ̀]; English: /ˌbɛtʃoʊˈkoʊ/) (from the Tłı̨chǫ meaning "Behcho's place"), officially the Tłı̨chǫ Community Government of Behchokǫ̀, is a community in the North Slave Region of the Northwest Territories, Canada. Behchokǫ̀ is located on the Yellowknife Highway (Great Slave Highway), on the northwest tip of Great Slave Lake, approximately 110 km (70 mi) northwest of Yellowknife.

== History ==
Prior to European contact, Dene people had been living in these territories exclusively for a long time.

English explorer Samuel Hearne was the first European to encounter Dogrib-speaking people. In 1772 he was crossing their lands north of Great Slave Lake. Later, in 1789, trader Alexander Mackenzie traveled by canoe very close to their territory while trading with the Yellowknives, another First Nations people, along the north arm of the big lake.

The first trading post in this region was at the entrance of Yellowknife Bay, established in 1789 by the North West Company, a post known as Old Fort Providence. It was established for the benefit of both the Yellowknives and Dogrib Dene but it was not a significant trading centre and closed in 1823.

The Dogrib Dene were required to enter into trade with Hudson's Bay Company posts on the south side of Great Slave Lake at Fort Resolution at the mouth of the Slave River. Historically, the Dogrib and the Yellowknives Dene have quarrelled over territory and resources. By the 1830s, Edzo, the Dogrib leader, and Akaitcho, the Yellowknives leader, made peace. Afterwards, the Dogrib returned to their traditional hunting grounds in the north.

Fort Rae was first established in 1852 by the Hudson's Bay Company (HBC) on a prominent peninsula on the north shore of the north arm of Great Slave Lake as a wintering provision post. It was named for Scotsman explorer John Rae, who was among the explorers looking for remains of Sir John Franklin's expedition in the Arctic. It became an important trading post for the Dogrib Dene.

In the early 20th century, free traders penetrated a monopoly previously held by the HBC. Ed Nagle and Jack Hislop opened a new trading post at the very northern tip of the north arm where Marian Lake connects to Great Slave Lake. As this location was much closer to many of the Dene families living on the land, it became their area of choice for trade. The HBC abandoned the old Fort Rae and set up a post next to Hislop and Nagle.

As the community grew alongside increased services such as a mission-run hospital and church, the government viewed the topography of Fort Rae as unsuitable for expansion. In the 1950s they were concerned about runoff from animal and human wastes contaminating sources of drinking water, and the government proposed constructing a new settlement on more favourable terrain. The community became known as Edzo and was located on the west side of the Frank Channel opposite Fort Rae, a 24 km (15 mi) drive away. Most of the Dene families refused to move from their community, so Rae (62°49′43″N 116°03′08″W) and Edzo (62°46′30″N 116°02′26″W) (Rae-Edzo) became two separate communities although they were administered together.

The name Rae-Edzo was changed 4 August 2005 to Behchokǫ̀. The biggest names in Tłı̨chǫ history are Edzo, Bruneau, and Monfwi. All men were Dogrib chiefs at important periods in their cultural history; Edzo signed the peace pact with the Yellowknives Dene in the 1820s, Jimmy Bruneau was a long-standing chief in the 20th century, and Monfwi signed Treaty 11 with the Canadian Government in 1921 and created the Tłı̨chǫ annual assembly in 1932.

Before 2005 the community was unincorporated, and most local governance was provided by a First Nations band government, Dog Rib Rae First Nation. Under the terms of the Tłı̨chǫ Agreement, most responsibilities of Dog Rib Rae have been transferred to the Behchokǫ̀ Community Government. However, the First Nation is still recognized by the federal government for Indian Act enrollment.

== Demographics ==
Federal census population history of Behchokò
Year	Pop.	±%
1971	1,081	—
1976	1,158	+7.1%
1981	1,378	+19.0%
1986	1,378	+0.0%
1991	1,521	+10.4%
1996	1,662	+9.3%
2001	1,702	+2.4%
2006	1,894	+11.3%
2011	1,926	+1.7%
2016	1,874	−2.7%
2021	1,746	−6.8%
Source: Statistics Canada

Annual population estimates

Year	Pop.	±%
1996	1,764	—
1997	1,755	−0.5%
1998	1,759	+0.2%
1999	1,755	−0.2%
2000	1,765	+0.6%
2001	1,785	+1.1%
2002	1,818	+1.8%
2003	1,870	+2.9%
2004	1,881	+0.6%
2005	1,936	+2.9%
2006	1,974	+2.0%

Year	Pop.	±%
2007	1,983	+0.5%
2008	1,999	+0.8%
2009	1,993	−0.3%
2010	1,985	−0.4%
2011	2,021	+1.8%
2012	2,027	+0.3%
2013	2,024	−0.1%
2014	2,055	+1.5%
2015	2,109	+2.6%
2016	2,183	+3.5%
2017	2,227	+2.0%

Sources: NWT Bureau of Statistics (2001 2017)

In the 2021 Census of Population conducted by Statistics Canada, Behchokò had a population of 1,746 living in 460 of its 541 total private dwellings, a change of −6.8% from its 2016 population of 1,874. With a land area of 74.96 km^{2} (28.94 sq mi), it had a population density of 23.3/km^{2} (60.3/sq mi) in 2021.

=== Ethnicity ===
According to the 2016 Census the Indigenous population was made up of 1,695 First Nations and 50 Métis people. One of the four Tłı̨chǫ communities, it is the largest Dene community in Canada. Behchokǫ̀ was the site of the signing of the Tłı̨chǫ land claim agreement that brought about the Tlicho Government.

Panethnic groups in the Community of Behchokǫ̀ (2001−2021)
Panethnic group	2021		2016		2011		2006		2001	
Panethnic group	Pop.	%	Pop.	%	Pop.	%	Pop.	%	Pop.	%
Indigenous	1,615	93.35%	1,755	94.1%	1,800	94.24%	1,770	93.9%	1,450	93.85%
European (Note: Statistic includes all persons that did not make up part of a visible minority or an indigenous identity.)	75	4.34%	85	4.56%	100	5.24%	105	5.57%	95	6.15%
South Asian	20	1.16%	0	0%	0	0%	10	0.53%	0	0%
African	10	0.58%	10	0.54%	0	0%	0	0%	10	0.65%
East Asian (Note: Statistic includes total responses of "Chinese", "Korean", and "Japanese" under visible minority section on census.)	0	0%	10	0.54%	0	0%	10	0.53%	0	0%
Southeast Asian (Note: Statistic includes total responses of "Filipino" and "Southeast Asian" under visible minority section on census.)	0	0%	0	0%	0	0%	0	0%	0	0%
Middle Eastern (Note: Statistic includes total responses of "West Asian" and "Arab" under visible minority section on census.)	0	0%	0	0%	0	0%	0	0%	0	0%
Latin American	0	0%	0	0%	0	0%	0	0%	0	0%
Other/multiracial (Note: Statistic includes total responses of "Visible minority, n.i.e." and "Multiple visible minorities" under visible minority section on census.)	0	0%	0	0%	10	0.52%	0	0%	0	0%
Total responses	1,730	99.08%	1,865	99.52%	1,910	99.17%	1,885	99.52%	1,545	99.55%
Total population	1,746	100%	1,874	100%	1,926	100%	1,894	100%	1,552	100%
Note: Totals greater than 100% due to multiple origin responses

== Transportation ==
The main street within Behchokǫ̀ is Donda Tili, which connects to the Yellowknife Highway and then to either Yellowknife or south to Fort Providence and southern Canada. Three ice roads are available during winter to connect to Gamètì, Wekweètì and Whatì to the north and west.

The closest major public airport is Yellowknife Airport via an hour drive east. Nearby Rae/Edzo Airport is a private airport.

== Services ==
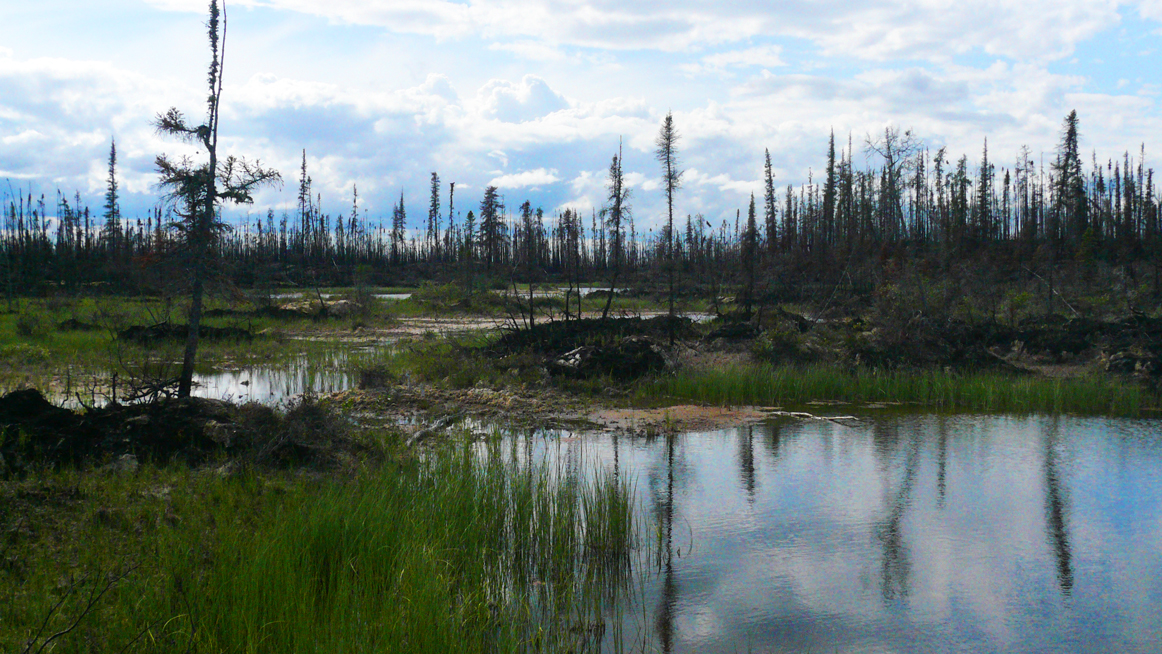
Boreal forest near Behchokǫ̀

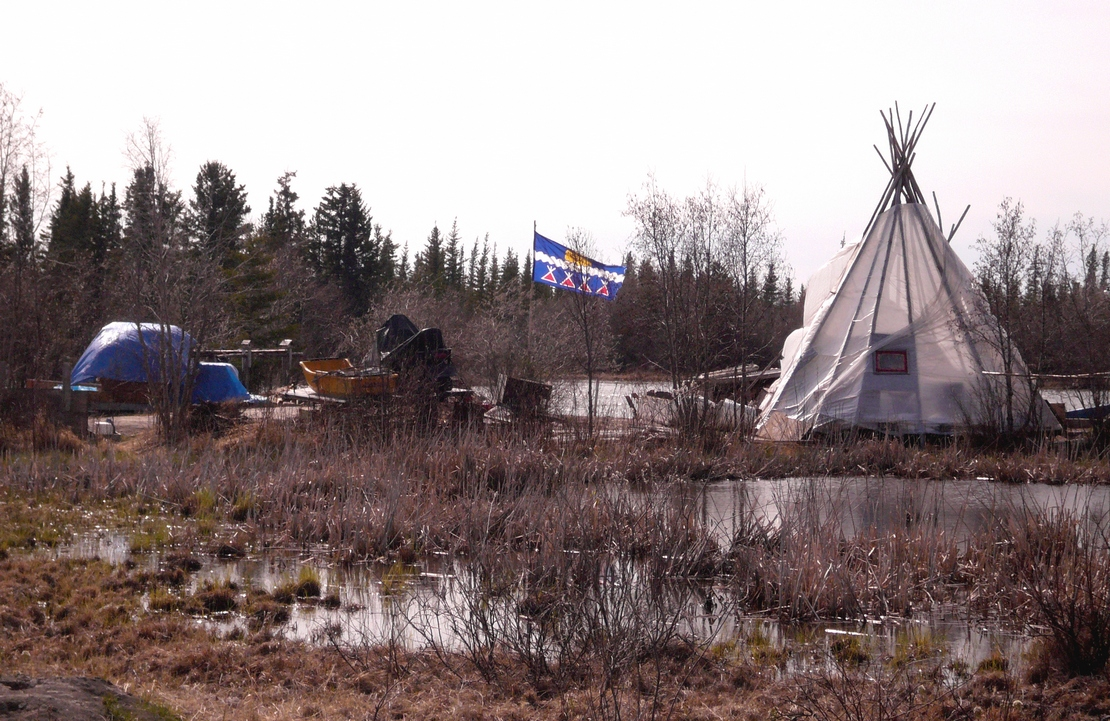
Rae Edzo - Behchokǫ̀, camp on the banks of Great Slave Lake

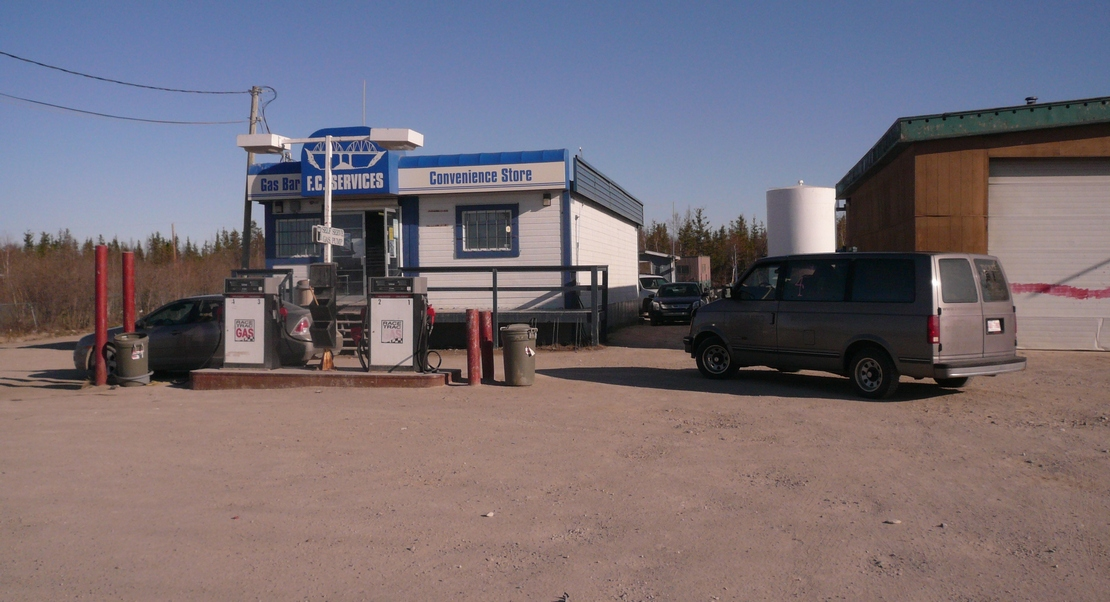
Gas station Behchokǫ̀

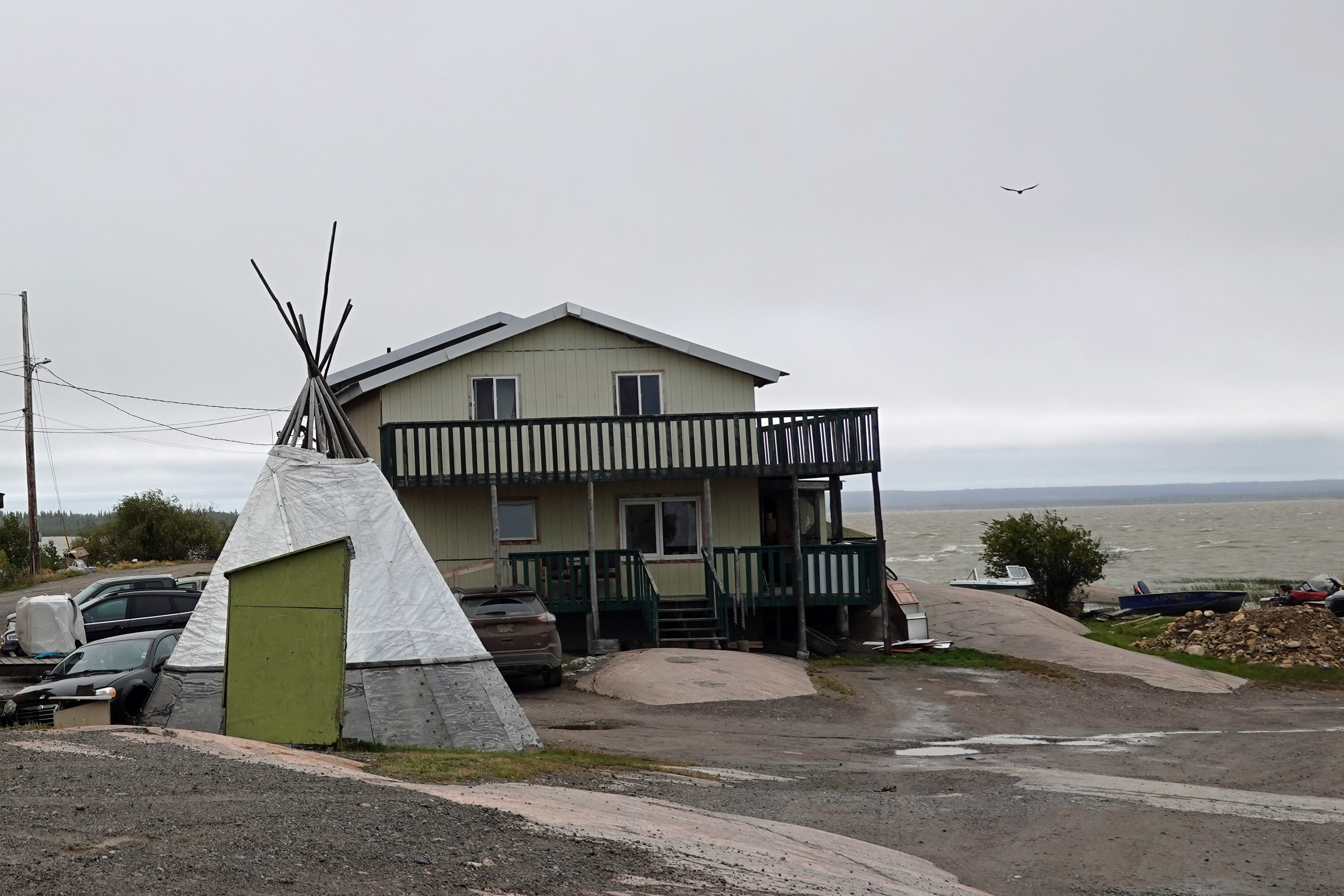
A traditional teepee beside a modern dwelling in Behchokǫ̀, with the Great Slave Lake in the background

=== Religious ===
- Tlicho Baptist Church
- St Michael's Catholic Church

=== Community ===
- Elizabeth Mackenzie Elementary School in Rae (K-6)
- Chief Jimmy Bruneau School in Edzo (K-12)
- Kǫ̀ Gocho Complex - recreation centre
- Behchokǫ̀ Cultural Centre - community centre
- Tłı̨chǫ Friendship Centre

=== Government ===
- Tłı̨chǫ Government Main Office
- N.W.T. Housing Corporation - public housing
- Municipal Services - sewage, water, public works
- Fire Department - volunteer service with two fire stations located in nearby Rae and Edzo
- Policing - local Royal Canadian Mounted Police detachment
- EMS - located at Mary Adele Bishop Health Centre with one ambulance

=== Medical ===
There is no hospital in town; the nearest is Stanton Territorial Hospital in Yellowknife and only basic health services are provided by Mary Adele Bishop Health Centre. The local dental clinic is private and there is a Mental Health and Addictions Services centre.

== Housing issues ==
Behchokǫ̀ has been facing a long term and chronic housing crisis due to multiple issues: insufficient funding for affordable units, disrepair of existing housing stock and inability of many living in public housing to pay rent.

== See also ==
- List of municipalities in the Northwest Territories
