= Chandap =

Village in Sabarkantha district, Gujarat, India

Coordinates: 23°55′27″N 72°50′40″E

Chandap is a village in the Sabarkantha district of Gujarat, in western India.

== History ==
Chandap was a petty princely state, also comprising three more villages. It was a matadari village without Chieftains and part of the Gadhwara thana, in Mahi Kantha.

It had a combined population of 588 in 1901, yielding a state revenue of 546 Rupees (1903–4, only from land) and paid double tribute: 71 Rupees to the Gaekwar Baroda State and 217 Rupees to Idar State.

== Sources and external links ==
- Imperial Gazetteer, on dsal.uchicago.edu - Mahi Kantha
