= Gamèti =

Community in Northwest Territories, Canada

Gamètì Rae Lakes
- Tłı̨chǫ Community Government
- Location within Northwest Territories Location within Canada
- Coordinates: 64°06′44″N 117°21′13″W
- Country: Canada
- Territory: Northwest Territories
- Region: North Slave Region
- Constituency: Monfwi
- Census division: Region 3
- Incorporated: 4 August 2005

Government
  - Senior Administrative Officer / Chief Administrative Officer: Richard Leong
  - Mayor / Chief: Doreen Arrowmaker
  - MLA: vacant

Area
  - Land: 9.19 km^{2} (3.55 sq mi)
- Elevation: 220 m (720 ft)

Population (2016)
  - Total: 278
  - Density: 30.3/km^{2} (78/sq mi)
- Time zone: UTC−06:00 (Northwest Territories Time)
- Canadian Postal code: X0E 1R0
- Area code: 867
- Telephone exchange: 997
- Living cost: 152.5^{A}
- Food price index: 123.3^{B}
- Sources: Department of Municipal and Community Affairs, Prince of Wales Northern Heritage Centre, Canada Flight Supplement^A2013 figure based on Edmonton = 100^B2015 figure based on Yellowknife = 100

Gamètì (/ˈɡæməti/; formerly known as Rae Lakes until 4 August 2005), officially the Tłı̨chǫ Community Government of Gamètì is a community in the North Slave Region of the Northwest Territories, Canada. Gamètì, according to the Prince of Wales Northern Heritage Centre means "rabbit-net lake". 'Gah means 'rabbit', and "mi" means net, "tì" means lake, or water. It is one of the four Tłı̨chǫ communities which form part of the Tlicho Government.

== History ==
The area is within the traditional territory of the Tłı̨chǫ (Dogrib) First Nations and was a popular hunting camp prior to permanent settlement. In the 1960s, Dene elders around Behchokǫ̀ decided to return to the land and establish traditional camps in the bush. Gamètì was established during this time, although in more recent years it too has become a modern community with essential services of its own. The community was officially known as Rae Lakes until August 4, 2005.

Before 2005, the community was unincorporated, and local governance was provided by a First Nations band government, Gameti First Nation. Under the terms of the Tłı̨chǫ Agreement, most responsibilities of Gamètì have been transferred to a new Gamètì Community Government. However, the First Nation is still recognized by the federal government for Indian Act enrollment.

== Demographics ==
Federal census population history of Gamètì
| Year | Pop. | ±% |
|---|---|---|
| 1976 | 164 | — |
| 1981 | 200 | +22.0% |
| 1986 | 183 | −8.5% |
| 1991 | 252 | +37.7% |
| 1996 | 256 | +1.6% |
| 2001 | 274 | +7.0% |
| 2006 | 283 | +3.3% |
| 2011 | 253 | −10.6% |
| 2016 | 278 | +9.9% |
| 2021 | 252 | −9.4% |
Source: Statistics Canada

Annual population estimates

| Year | Pop. | ±% |
|---|---|---|
| 1996 | 263 | — |
| 1997 | 273 | +3.8% |
| 1998 | 290 | +6.2% |
| 1999 | 285 | −1.7% |
| 2000 | 289 | +1.4% |
| 2001 | 291 | +0.7% |
| 2002 | 293 | +0.7% |
| 2003 | 300 | +2.4% |
| 2004 | 288 | −4.0% |
| 2005 | 292 | +1.4% |
| 2006 | 288 | −1.4% |

| Year | Pop. | ±% |
|---|---|---|
| 2007 | 289 | +0.3% |
| 2008 | 277 | −4.2% |
| 2009 | 255 | −7.9% |
| 2010 | 258 | +1.2% |
| 2011 | 263 | +1.9% |
| 2012 | 274 | +4.2% |
| 2013 | 283 | +3.3% |
| 2014 | 293 | +3.5% |
| 2015 | 287 | −2.0% |
| 2016 | 288 | +0.3% |
| 2017 | 291 | +1.0% |

Sources: NWT Bureau of Statistics (2001 - 2017)

In the 2021 Census of Population conducted by Statistics Canada, Gamètì had a population of 252 living in 82 of its 104 total private dwellings, a change of −9.4% from its 2016 population of 278. With a land area of 9.04 km^{2} (3.49 sq mi), it had a population density of 27.9/km^{2} (72.2/sq mi) in 2021.

According to the 2016 Census there were 270 Indigenous people, of which all were First Nations. Local languages are Dogrib (Tłı̨chǫ) some Slavey and English.

== Services ==
The community, which is served by the Gamètì/Rae Lakes Airport, does not have all-weather road access, but an ice road is sometimes built in the winter. There is a daycare in the Gamètì and the Jean Wetrade School that provides education up to grade 12, along with a community learning centre. Other services include a post office, a two-member RCMP detachment, a health centre, with one nurse and the Rae Lakes General Store.

== Climate ==
Gamètì has a subarctic climate (Dfc) with the average high throughout the year averaging below the freezing point. Due to it being below the tree line it has relatively warm but short summers.

Climate data for Gamèti (Rae Lakes) Climate ID: 2203359; coordinates 64°06′43″N 117°19′41″W; elevation: 223.2 m (732 ft); 1981-2010 normals
| Month | Jan | Feb | Mar | Apr | May | Jun | Jul | Aug | Sep | Oct | Nov | Dec | Year |
|---|---|---|---|---|---|---|---|---|---|---|---|---|---|
| Record high humidex | −1.1 | −1.8 | 8.1 | 19.1 | 26.7 | 33.9 | 36.4 | 31.9 | 26.2 | 17.8 | 3.3 | 1.4 | 36.4 |
| Record high °C (°F) | −0.8 (30.6) | −1.4 (29.5) | 9.4 (48.9) | 19.2 (66.6) | 26.7 (80.1) | 32.6 (90.7) | 32.0 (89.6) | 31.7 (89.1) | 23.6 (74.5) | 18.3 (64.9) | 5.0 (41.0) | 1.7 (35.1) | 32.6 (90.7) |
| Mean daily maximum °C (°F) | −22.7 (−8.9) | −18.3 (−0.9) | −11.4 (11.5) | 1.3 (34.3) | 8.9 (48.0) | 17.9 (64.2) | 21.5 (70.7) | 17.1 (62.8) | 10.1 (50.2) | −0.2 (31.6) | −11.0 (12.2) | −17.1 (1.2) | −0.3 (31.5) |
| Daily mean °C (°F) | −27.1 (−16.8) | −23.6 (−10.5) | −18.5 (−1.3) | −5.9 (21.4) | 3.4 (38.1) | 12.9 (55.2) | 16.8 (62.2) | 13.2 (55.8) | 7.0 (44.6) | −2.7 (27.1) | −14.5 (5.9) | −21.5 (−6.7) | −5.0 (23.0) |
| Mean daily minimum °C (°F) | −31.5 (−24.7) | −28.9 (−20.0) | −25.4 (−13.7) | −13.1 (8.4) | −2.2 (28.0) | 7.9 (46.2) | 12.2 (54.0) | 9.2 (48.6) | 3.8 (38.8) | −5.2 (22.6) | −18.1 (−0.6) | −25.9 (−14.6) | −9.8 (14.4) |
| Record low °C (°F) | −51.5 (−60.7) | −47.8 (−54.0) | −46.6 (−51.9) | −35.5 (−31.9) | −22.3 (−8.1) | −1.0 (30.2) | −0.1 (31.8) | −1.0 (30.2) | −7.7 (18.1) | −28.1 (−18.6) | −41.3 (−42.3) | −47.1 (−52.8) | −51.5 (−60.7) |
| Record low wind chill | −53.6 | −60.4 | −51.5 | −43.3 | −30.7 | −6.1 | 0.0 | 0.0 | −13.4 | −33.3 | −45.4 | −53.0 | −60.4 |
| Average relative humidity (%) (at 1500 LST) | 73.2 | 72.3 | 60.5 | 54.0 | 50.4 | 45.7 | 49.6 | 59.8 | 69.6 | 79.5 | 84.3 | 80.9 | 65.0 |
Source: Environment and Climate Change Canada

== See also ==
- List of municipalities in the Northwest Territories
