= 2007 Northwest Territories general election =

- October 1, 2007

19 seats in the Legislative Assembly of the Northwest Territories
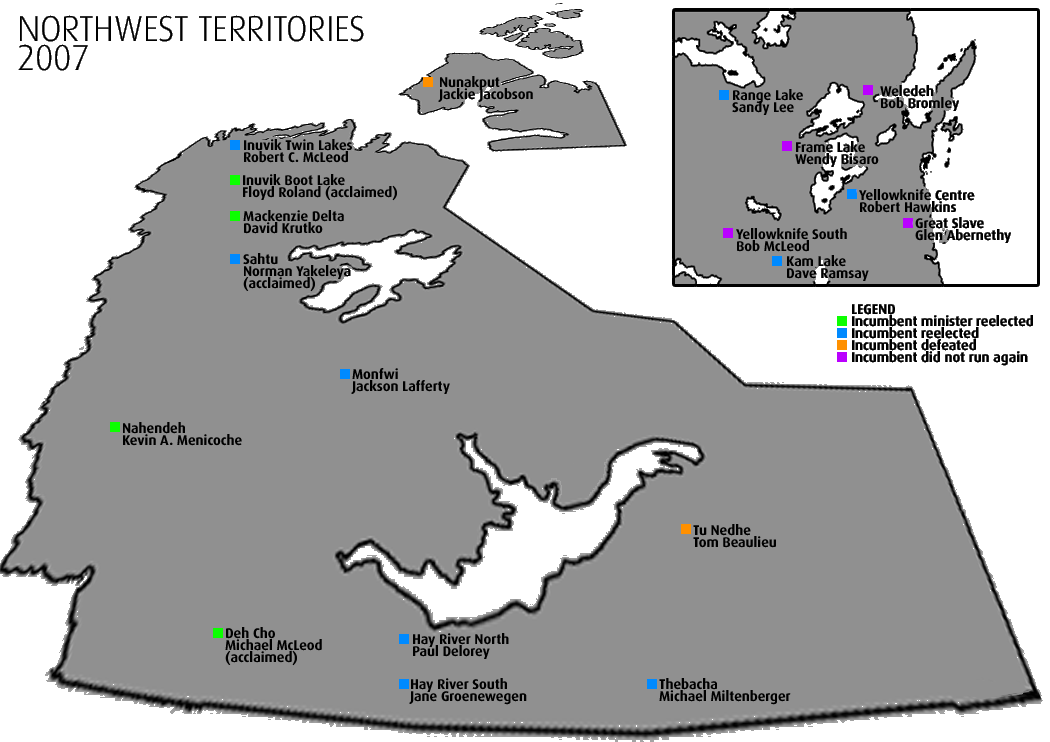
Premier before election
Joe Handley
Premier after election
Floyd Roland

The 2007 Northwest Territories general election took place on October 1, 2007. Nineteen members were elected to the Legislative Assembly from single member districts conducted under first-past-the-post voting system.

The election was called on September 3, 2007, when the writ of returns was dropped by Chief Electoral Officer Saundra Arberry. This election was the first in Northwest Territories history to be conducted on a fixed election date calendar.

The territory operates on a consensus government system with no political parties; the premier is subsequently chosen by and from the Members of the Legislative Assembly (MLAs).

== Election campaign ==
The final list of candidates was released on September 7, 2007. Three incumbents were returned by acclamation. Four other high-profile incumbents were not running for re-election, including Premier Joe Handley representing Weledeh, cabinet minister and dean of the legislature Charles Dent representing Frame Lake, cabinet minister Brenden Bell and private member Bill Braden (brother of former Premier George Braden).

=== Premier retires ===
Joe Handley the 10th Premier of the Northwest Territories, announced his retirement.

=== Rehab ===
Former candidate Peter Liske withdrew his candidacy shortly before the nomination deadline closed in Weledeh. Liske's campaign came under scrutiny after he promised to enter rehab for alcohol abuse if he was elected. His campaign promise acquired international attention after the story was picked up by The Tonight Show as part of the Headlines segment. The original news story Dettah chief candidates debate issues featured in the Headlines segment was published by the Northern News Service on August 6, 2007.

=== Criminal records ===
Four candidates who ran in 2007 have criminal records. Henry Zoe, former MLA for North Slave, was twice convicted for spousal assault and resisting arrest. He resigned his seat over the latter charge in 2004. Hay River South candidate Greg McMeekin was convicted of assault, resisting arrest and making death threats; a warrant was out for his arrest for violating probation. Nahendeh candidate Arnold Hope was convicted for drug possession in 2006 and unsafe storage of a firearm. Marc Bogan was convicted of the misdemeanor charge of mischief for releasing live crickets all over the Yellowknife Courthouse in 2005.

=== Conflict of interest ===
In the electoral district of Tu Nedhe, incumbent Bobby J. Villeneuve finished a distant fourth in a field of six candidates. He was disciplined by the Conflict of Interest commissioner in June 2007 after swearing a legal oath that he lived in Fort Resolution, Northwest Territories, which allowed him access to a CA$25,000 a year living allowance for living accommodations in Yellowknife. The estimated cost to tax payers was $65,000. He was forced to reimburse $10,000.

=== Disqualification ===
A complaint was filed to the Chief Returning Officer Saundra Arberry over the disqualification of Tu Nedhe candidate Noeline Villebrun. The former candidate sent her nomination paperwork and endorsement signatures by facsimile from British Columbia, a half-hour before the nomination deadline on September 7, 2007. The returning officer from Elections NWT disqualified the paperwork on the grounds that the paperwork was not in the original ink. Villebrun's official agent filed a complaint on the basis that submitting paper work by fax is not forbidden under the Elections Act. Arberry upheld the decision of the Returning Officer and advised the Villebrun campaign to seek legal counsel. Villebrun was attempting her second run at office, she last ran as a candidate in the 1999 Northwest Territories general election in the same electoral district.

=== NWT Party ===
In past elections, political parties have appeared claiming to run slates of candidates. Yellowknife Centre candidate Bryan Sutherland claimed to lead the NWT Party, and was the only candidate in this election representing the party in its slate. Sutherland said that whether or not he was elected he would push for the party to be formally registered. The Northwest Territories has no laws recognizing or validating any political parties operating on the territorial level. Sutherland was defeated, finishing a distant fourth in his district.

=== New Premier selected ===
On October 17, 2007 Inuvik Boot Lake MLA Floyd Roland was elected as the eleventh Premier of the territory by the Legislative Assembly. He ran for Premier against Thebacha MLA Michael Miltenberger. After being elected Premier, Roland promised to push the Government of Canada to give the Northwest Territories provincial powers enjoyed by other jurisdictions.

== Election summary ==
Election summary	# of candidates		Popular vote	
Election summary	Incumbent	New	#	%
Elected candidates	10	6	6,992	54.14%
Acclaimed candidates	3	0		
Defeated candidates	2	34	5,922	45.86%
Total	55		12,914	100%
Voter Turnout %			Rejected Ballots	

== District and candidate results ==
District	Winner	2nd place	3rd place	4th place	**5th place**	
Deh Cho	**Michael McLeod**					
Frame Lake	Wendy Bisaro; 389	Chris Johnston; 162	Jeff Groenewegen; 137			
Great Slave	Glen Abernethy; 336	Doug Ritchie; 206	Christopher Hunt; 103	Beaton Mackenzie; 101	Mark Bogan; 21	
Hay River North	**Paul Delorey**; 514	Vince McKay; 329				
Hay River South	**Jane Groenewegen**; 423	Marc Miltenberger; 384	Greg McMeekin; 10			
Inuvik Boot Lake	**Floyd Roland**					
Inuvik Twin Lakes	**Robert C. McLeod**; 306	Denise Kurszewski; 261				
Kam Lake	**Dave Ramsay**; 489	Brad Enge; 118				
Mackenzie Delta	**David Krutko**; 303	Mary Joanne Clark; 164	Donald Robert; 132			
Monfwi	**Jackson Lafferty**; 579	Henry Zoe; 495				
Nahendeh	**Kevin A. Menicoche**; 549	Arnold Hope; 203	Bob Hanna; 71	Keyna Norwegian; 70		
Nunakput	Jackie Jacobson; 266	Vince J. Teddy; 150	Eddie Dillon; 142	**Calvin P. Pokiak**; 74		
Range Lake	**Sandy Lee**; 564	Ashley Geraghty; 210				
Sahtu	**Norman Yakeleya**					
Thebacha	**Michael Miltenberger**; 531	Peter Martselos; 444	Jeannie Marie-Jewell; 197			
Tu Nedhe	Tom Beaulieu; 252	Steve Ellis; 175	Raymond Simon; 26	**Bobby J. Villeneuve**; 12	Andrew Butler; 6	James W. McPherson; 6
Weledeh	Bob Bromley; 522	Andy Wong; 409	Jonas Sangris; 244	Carol Morin; 34		
Yellowknife Centre	**Robert Hawkins**; 430	Sue Glowach; 258	Ben McDonald; 204	Bryan Sutherland; 29		
Yellowknife South	Bob McLeod; 539	Amy Hacala; 278	Garett Cochrane; 57			

Notes:

- Candidates in bold denotes incumbents.
- With the exception of Michael McLeod, Floyd Roland and Norman Yakeleya, who were all acclaimed, the results are currently unofficial.
