= Arlooktoo =

Arlooktoo is an Inuit surname. Notable people with this name include:

- Goo Arlooktoo (1963–2002), Canadian politician
- Joe Arlooktoo (1939–2025), Canadian artist and politician
