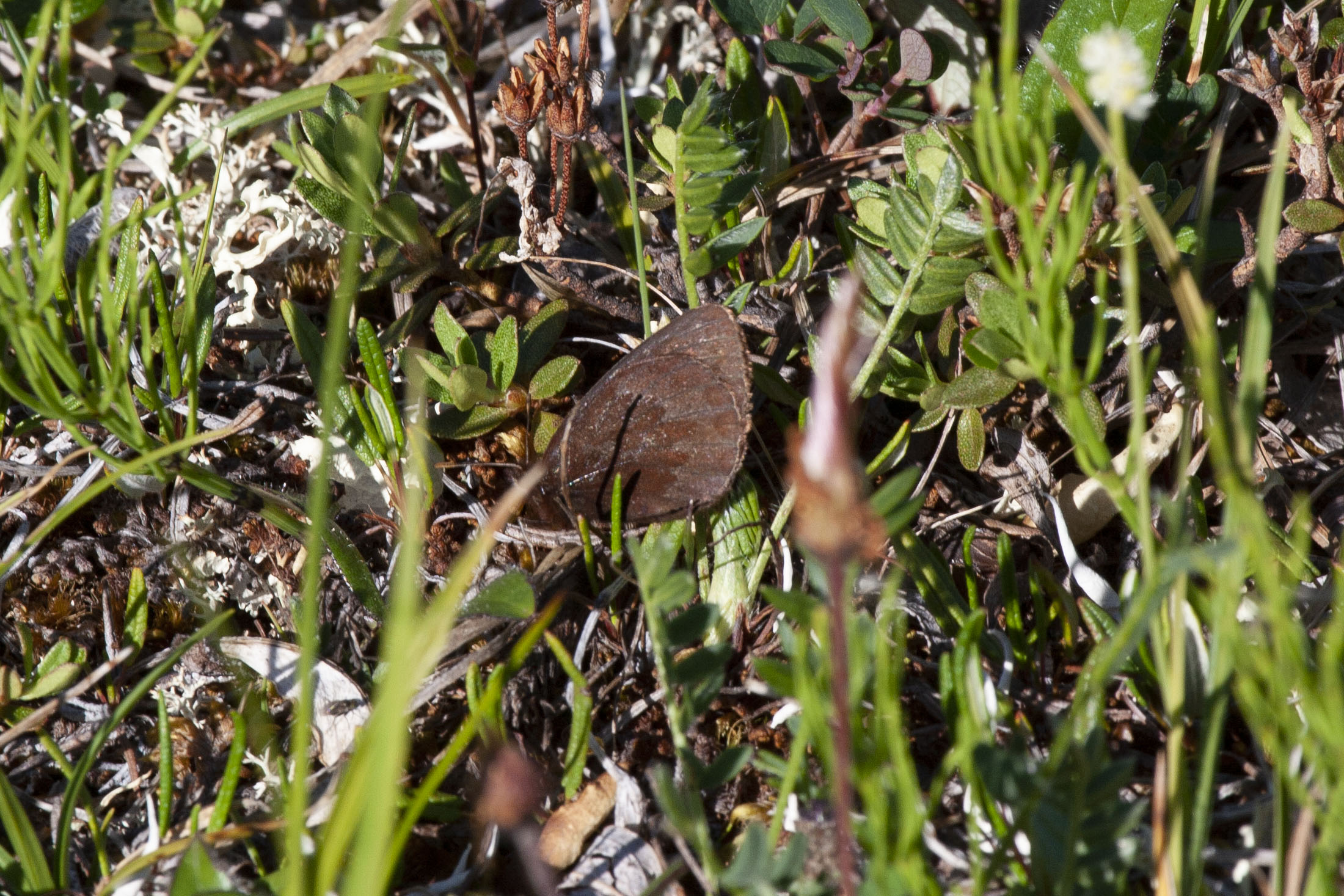

Scientific classification
- Kingdom: Animalia
- Phylum: Arthropoda
- Clade: Pancrustacea
- Class: Insecta
- Order: Lepidoptera
- Family: Nymphalidae
- Genus: Erebia
- Species: E. lafontainei

Binomial name
- Erebia lafontainei Troubridge & Philip, 1983

= Erebia lafontainei =

Reddish alpine

Species of butterfly

Erebia lafontainei, the reddish alpine or Lafontaine's alpine, is a member of the subfamily Satyrinae of the family Nymphalidae. It is found in northern North America from Alaska, Yukon, and western Northwest Territories as far east as Tuktoyuktuk.

The wingspan is 33–41 mm. Adults are on the wing from mid-June to late July.

== Similar species ==
- Four-dotted alpine (E. youngi)
- Scree alpine (E. anyuica)
