= Nøkleby =

Nøkleby, Nökleby, or Nokleby is a Norwegian and Swedish surname. Notable people with the surname include:

- Berit Nøkleby (1939–2018), Norwegian historian
- Monica Elfvin (born 1938), later Nökleby, Swedish gymnast
- Katrina Nokleby, Canadian politician
