= Monfwi =

Territorial electoral district in the Northwest Territories, Canada

Northwest Territories electoral district
- Boundaries of Monfwi

Territorial electoral district
- Legislature: Legislative Assembly of the Northwest Territories
MLA
Jane Weyallon Armstrong
- First contested: 1999
- Last contested: 2023
- Region: North Slave Region
- Communities: Behchokǫ̀, Gamèti, Wekweètì, Whatì

Monfwi is a territorial electoral district for the Legislative Assembly of the Northwest Territories, Canada. The district consists of the four Tłı̨chǫ communities of Behchokǫ̀, Gamèti, Wekweètì and Whatì.

Its Member of the Legislative Assembly is Jane Weyallon Armstrong.

== Renaming ==
The electoral district was renamed from North Slave to Monfwi on August 4, 2005. The date was chosen to coincide with the date the Tlicho Land Claim and Self-Government Agreement came into effect. The name change effected Jackson Lafferty who was elected in a by-election on July 18, 2005, and took his seat in the legislature on August 11, 2005. He was still considered to be elected as the elected member for the North Slave riding despite being sworn in after the name was changed.

== Members of the Legislative Assembly (MLAs) ==
Name	Elected	Left office
Leon Lafferty	1999	2003
Henry Zoe	2003	2007
Jackson Lafferty	2007	2021
Jane Weyallon Armstrong	2021	present

== Election results ==
=== 2023 election ===
2023 Northwest Territories general election
Candidate	Votes
Jane Weyallon Armstrong (I)	Acclaimed

=== 2021 by-election ===
Northwest Territories territorial by-election, July 27, 2021
Candidate	Votes	%
Jane Armstrong	503	54.44
Kelvin Kotchilea	252	27.27
John J. Gon	98	10.61
James Wah-Shee	71	7.68
Total valid ballots	924	
Source(s) "Unofficial Results".

=== 2019 election ===
2019 Northwest Territories general election
Candidate	Votes
Jackson Lafferty	Acclaimed
Source(s) "Eight ridings to watch in the Northwest Territories' election". CBC.

=== 2015 election ===
2015 Northwest Territories general election
Candidate	Votes
Jackson Lafferty	Acclaimed

=== 2011 election ===
2011 Northwest Territories general election
Candidate	Votes
Jackson Lafferty	739
Bertha Rabesca Zoe	600

=== 2007 election ===
2007 Northwest Territories general election
Candidate	Votes	%
Jackson Lafferty	579	53.17%
Henry Zoe	495	45.45%
Total valid ballots / Turnout	1,074	66.20%
Rejected ballots	15	
Source(s) "Official Voting Results 2007 General Election" (PDF). Elections NWT. Archived from the original (PDF) on April 11, 2008.

=== 2003 election ===
2003 Northwest Territories general election: North Slave
Candidate	Votes	%
Henry Zoe	495	42.27%
Nora Doig	379	32.37%
Leon Lafferty	297	25.36%
Total valid ballots / Turnout	1,171	75.44%
Rejected ballots	18	
Source(s) "Official Voting Results 2003 General Election" (PDF). Elections NWT. Archived from the original (PDF) on April 11, 2008.

=== 1999 election ===
1999 Northwest Territories general election: North Slave
Candidate	Votes	%
Leon Lafferty	332	28.23%
Henry Zoe	303	25.77%
George Mackenzie	267	22.70%
James Wah-Shee	121	10.29%
James Rabesca	81	6.89%
Georgina Franki	32	2.72%
Alfonz Nitsiza	20	1.70%
Isidore Zoe	20	1.70%
Total valid ballots / Turnout	1,176	79.00%
Rejected ballots	20	
Source(s) "Official Voting Results 1999 General Election" (PDF). Elections NWT. Archived from the original (PDF) on April 11, 2008.

== Notes ==
a: Prior to the 2007 election the district was known as North Slave.
b: In the 2007 election, percentages assigned to candidates were based on the total votes cast. In prior elections the percentages were based on the valid votes.

== See also ==
- List of Northwest Territories territorial electoral districts
- Canadian provincial electoral districts
