= Vince Steen =

Canadian politician (1941–2007)

Vince Steen (June 17, 1941 in Aklavik, Northwest Territories – February 3, 2007) was a politician. He served as a municipal councilor of Tuktoyaktuk and later became mayor. Afterwards he was also a member of the Legislative Assembly of the Northwest Territories. Prior to politics he was also civil servant, heavy equipment operator and a licensed watercraft operator.

== Early life and education ==
Steen was born in 1941 in Aklavik in the Mackenzie Delta region of the Northwest Territories. He lived his whole life in northern Canada. Steen was educated at a local residential school in his hometown of Aklavik for seven years. He went to post secondary education at the Northern Alberta Institute of Technology. At the vocational school, Steen attained his journeyman certificate as a heavy equipment operator.

== Municipal and board politics ==
Steen began his political career serving on local community boards, serving a number of posts through the 1970s and 80s. He first joined the Tuktoyaktuk Hunters and trappers Committee in 1973 and served as a regular board member and chairman of the board for various periods until 1989. In 1974, he was chairman of the NWT Game Council.

Steen was appointed in 1975 to the Federal Fisheries and Oceans Advisory Committee on Whales and Whaling, serving until 1977. He became Vice President of the Inuit Taparitsat of Canada in 1976 and served that post until 1978. The pinnacle of Steen's municipal career came when he was elected mayor of Tuktoyaktuk for a year in 1980. Four years later he became a board member of the Tuktoyaktuk Community Corporation. His last board posting was as Chief of the Inuvialuit Land Administration Committee for the Inuvialuit Regional Corporation, from 1986 until 1989.

== Bureaucrat ==
Steen served a long career as a civil servant on both the territorial and municipal levels of government. He began working for the Tuktoyaktuk municipal government in 1977. He served as Justice of the Peace and as the coroner for the hamlet until 1990.

In 1987, Steen was promoted to Senior Administration Officer for Paulatuk and Tuktoyaktuk. He held that position until he was hired on by the Government of the Northwest Territories in 1991. The government made him the Highway Maintenance Supervisor for Tuktoyaktuk and Wrigley, and he served in that role until his election in 1995.

== Legislative Assembly ==
Steen was elected to the Northwest Territories Legislature in the 1995 Northwest Territories general election. He was re-elected to a second term in the 1999 Northwest Territories general election.

At the beginning of his second term in office, he was appointed to the cabinet by Premier Stephen Kakfwi. He was given the portfolios of Minister of Public Works and Services, as well as the Minister of Municipal and Community Affairs. Steen focused his time as a member of the territorial cabinet to help develop safer drinking water and sewage treatment in the territory. He also pushed for territorial funding to help train municipalities to better govern themselves.

Steen ran for a third term in the 2003 Northwest Territories general election. He was defeated by Calvin Pokiak in an upset victory. He lost the riding by 27 votes, a margin of five percent.

== After politics ==
After his defeat from the territorial assembly, Steen was diagnosed with bone cancer in May 2006. Steen sought out treatment at three different medical facilities in the Northwest Territories: Rosie Ovayuak Health Centre in Tuktoyuktuk, Inuvik Regional Hospital and Stanton Territorial Hospital in Yellowknife. He died eight months later from the disease on February 3, 2007 in Inuvik Hospital.

Legislative Assembly of the Northwest Territories
Preceded by Nellie Cournoyea	MLA Nunakput; 1995-2003	Succeeded by Calvin Pokiak
