= Jackie Jacobson =

Canadian politician

Member of the Legislative Assembly of the Northwest Territories for Nunakput
- In office October 1, 2007 – November 23, 2015
- Preceded by: Calvin Pokiak
- Succeeded by: Herbert Nakimayak
- In office October 1, 2019 – November 14, 2023
- Preceded by: Herbert Nakimayak
- Succeeded by: Lucy Kuptana

13th Speaker of the Legislative Assembly of the Northwest Territories
- In office October 3, 2011 – November 23, 2015
- Preceded by: Paul Delorey
- Succeeded by: Jackson Lafferty

Personal details
- Born: Tuktoyaktuk, Northwest Territories
- Party: non-partisan consensus government

Jackie Jacobson (born Tuktoyaktuk, Northwest Territories) is a Canadian politician, who represented the electoral district of Nunakput in the Legislative Assembly of the Northwest Territories from 2007 to 2015, and again from 2019 to 2023.

== Political career ==
Jacobson began his political career as mayor of Tuktoyaktuk. During his tenure he was forced to deal with problems caused by erosion of the coast line and damage to the community from the Beaufort Sea.

Jacobson ran as a candidate in the Nunakput electoral district in the 2007 Northwest Territories general election. He defeated incumbent Calvin Pokiak and two other candidates with 42% of the vote to win his first term in office. He served as Speaker of the legislature from 2011 to 2015.

He was defeated in the 2015 election by Herbert Nakimayak, but defeated Nakimayak in the 2019 election to reclaim the seat.

On 23 April 2024, Jacobson announced he was seeking the Conservative Party of Canada nomination for the Northwest Territories federal riding.
