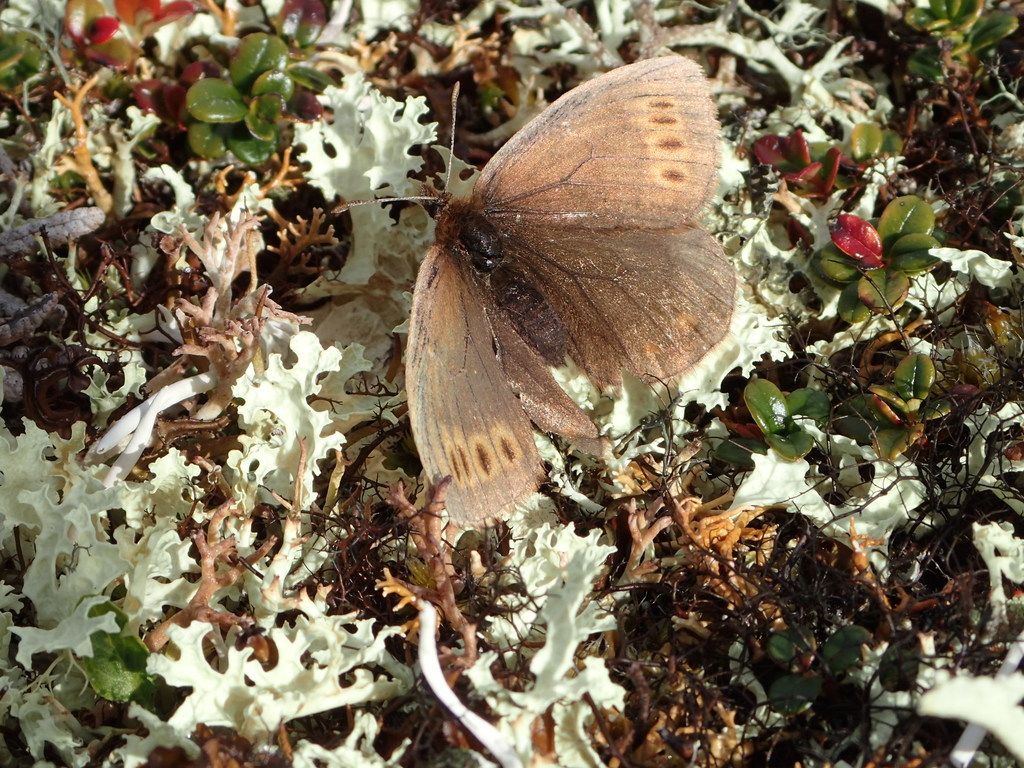

Scientific classification
- Kingdom: Animalia
- Phylum: Arthropoda
- Class: Insecta
- Order: Lepidoptera
- Family: Nymphalidae
- Genus: Erebia
- Species: E. youngi

Binomial name
- Erebia youngi Holland, 1900

Subspecies
- Three, see text

= Erebia youngi =

Species of butterfly

The four-dotted alpine (Erebia youngi) is a member of the subfamily Satyrinae of the family Nymphalidae. It is found in the north of North America from Alaska, western Yukon, and east in the Northwest Territories as far as Fort McPherson and Tuktoyuktuk.

The wingspan is 35–44 mm. Adults are on the wing from mid-June to late July.

== Subspecies ==
- Erebia youngi youngi (Yukon, Alaska)
- Erebia youngi herscheli Leussler, 1935 (Yukon)
- Erebia youngi rileyi dos Passos, 1947 (Alaska)

== Similar species ==
- Reddish alpine (E. lafontainei)
- Scree alpine (E. anyuica)
