= Calvin Pokiak =

Canadian politician

Calvin P. Pokiak (born May 28, 1955, Tuktoyaktuk, Northwest Territories, Canada) is a former territorial level politician.

Pokiak first became a politician on the municipal level serving as a councilor on the Hamlet of Tuktoyaktuk council. He later served as mayor for the community.

Pokiak ran for a seat 2003 Northwest Territories general election. He won the Nunakput electoral district defeating incumbent Vince Steen. He was defeated in his bid for re-election to a second term in the 2007 Northwest Territories general election. He came last in a field of four candidates.

Legislative Assembly of the Northwest Territories
Preceded by Vince Steen	MLA Nunakput; 2003-2007	Succeeded by Jackie Jacobson
