= Henry Zoe =

Canadian politician

Henry Zoe is a former politician from Northwest Territories, Canada.

== Political career ==
Zoe was first elected to the Northwest Legislature in the 1987 Northwest Territories general election in the North Slave riding. He ran for re-election in the 1991 Northwest Territories general election defeating 2 other candidates to win his second term in office. Zoe did run when the Legislature dissolved in 1995. Zoe ran for re-election in the 1999 Northwest Territories general election but was defeated by Leon Lafferty. Zoe would run again in the 2003 Northwest Territories general election this time defeating Lafferty.

=== Third term ===
After winning re-election to his third term in 1999, Zoe was appointed by Premier Joe Handley to the cabinet as Minister of Municipal Affairs and Community development. Zoe became mired in scandal on May 15, 2004 after a night of drinking at the Royal Canadian Legion in Yellowknife, when he was overheard making derogatory comments about Newfoundlanders. Premier Handley stripped him of his portfolios, becoming a Minister Without Portfolio on May 29, 2004, after being pressured by repeated calls to revoke his portfolios. The legislature removed him as cabinet minister in a vote of no confidence on May 31, 2004.

He resigned his seat on May 30, 2005, after being convicted of resisting arrest.

Zoe was defeated in the 2007 Northwest Territories general election. He collected approximately 46% against the incumbent, Jackson Lafferty, in the electoral district of Monfwi.

Legislative Assembly of the Northwest Territories
| Preceded by James Wah-Shee | MLA Rae-Lac La Martre; 1987-1991 | Succeeded by District Abolished |
| Preceded by New District | MLA North Slave; 1991-1995 | Succeeded by James Rabesca |
| Preceded by Leon Lafferty | MLA North Slave; 2003-2005 | Succeeded by Jackson Lafferty |
