= Kate Reid (politician) =

Canadian politician

Kate Reid MLA

Member of the Legislative Assembly of the Northwest Territories
- Incumbent
- Assumed office November 14, 2023
- Preceded by: Katrina Nokleby
- Constituency: Great Slave

Personal details
- Born: 1981 (age 44–45) Oshawa, Ontario
- Party: non-partisan consensus government

Kate Reid (born 1981) is a Canadian politician, who was elected to the Legislative Assembly of the Northwest Territories in the 2023 election. She represents the electoral district of Great Slave.

== Election results ==
2023 Northwest Territories general election: Great Slave
Candidate	Votes	%
Kate Reid	263	34.79
Stacie Arden Smith	237	31.35
Katrina Nokleby (I)	197	26.06
James Lawrence	59	7.80
Total votes	756	
