= Kenoayoak Pudlat =

Canadian politician

Kenoayoak Pudlat is a former territorial level politician from Lake Harbour, Northwest Territories, now Kimmirut, Nunavut

Pudlat was elected to the Baffin South electoral district in the 1991 Northwest Territories general election. He defeated long serving incumbent Joe Arlooktoo. Pudlat did not return to the Legislature in 1995.

Legislative Assembly of the Northwest Territories
Preceded by Joe Arlooktoo	MLA Baffin South; 1991–1995	Succeeded by Goo Arlooktoo
