= Herbert Nakimayak =

Canadian politician

Member of the Legislative Assembly of the Northwest Territories for Nunakput
- In office November 23, 2015 – September 2, 2019
- Preceded by: Jackie Jacobson
- Succeeded by: Jackie Jacobson

Personal details
- Born: Inuvik, Northwest Territories
- Party: non-partisan consensus government

Herbert Nakimayak is a Canadian politician, who was elected to the Legislative Assembly of the Northwest Territories in the 2015 election. He represented the electoral district of Nunakput until the 2019 election.

Nakimayak was born in Inuvik, Northwest Territories and grew up in Paulatuk. He was a Parks Canada warden at Tuktut Nogait and several other national parks. He chairs the joint secretariat of the Fisheries Joint Management Committee in the Inuvialuit Settlement Region from 2021 and works on marine management issues in the western Arctic.

In the 2015 Northwest Territories general election, he defeated incumbent Jackie Jacobson in the Nunakput district. However, he lost his seat in the next general election in 2019 when Jacobson defeated him. After the election loss, he began working for Fisheries and Oceans Canada in 2020 to promote marine conservation activities in Canada's western Arctic.

Nakimayak was the vice-president (international) of Inuit Circumpolar Council Canada from 2014 to 2018 and from 2022 to 2025, before being appointed as the interim president in September 2025 until the election in 2026.

== Personal life ==
Nakimayak was born to Helen and Jonah. Nakimayak has two daughters, Madeline and Grace. He currently lives in Yellowknife.
