= Norman Yakeleya =

Canadian politician (born 1959)

Member of the Legislative Assembly of the Northwest Territories
- In office November 24, 2003 – 2015
- Preceded by: Stephen Kakfwi
- Succeeded by: Daniel McNeely
- Constituency: Sahtu

Personal details
- Born: March 13, 1959 (age 67) Yellowknife, Northwest Territories
- Party: Independent

Norman Yakeleya (born March 13, 1959) is a Canadian territorial level politician from Northwest Territories, Canada.

== Political career ==
Yakeleya first began his political career on the municipal level as a city councillor for the Yellowknife City Council from 1987 until 1990. He then served as Chief of the Tulita Dene Band and Chairman of the Sahtu tribal Council.

Yakeleya was first elected to the Northwest Territories Legislature in the 2003 Northwest Territories general election defeating four other candidates to win his first term in office. He was re-elected to his second term in office in the 2007 Northwest Territories general election by acclamation.
