= Tu Nedhe =

Former territorial electoral district in the Northwest Territories, Canada

Tu Nedhe was a territorial electoral district for the Legislative Assembly of the Northwest Territories, Canada. The district consists of Fort Resolution and Lutselk'e.

The riding was dissolved for the 2015 election, merging with the district of Weledeh to create the new district of Tu Nedhé-Wiilideh.

== Members of the Legislative Assembly (MLAs) ==
Name	Elected	Left Office
Eliza Lawrence	1983	1987
Don Morin	1987	1999
Steven Nitah	1999	2003
Bobby J. Villeneuve	2003	2007
Tom Beaulieu	2007	2015

== Election results ==
=== 2015 election ===
Tu Nedhé-Wiilideh
Name	Vote	%
Tom Beaulieu**	410	71.1
Richard Edjericon	177	28.9
Total Valid Ballots	587	100%
Turnout		71%

**Beaulieu was previously member for the abolished district of Weledeh

=== 2011 election ===
2011 Northwest Territories general election
Name	Vote	%
Tom Beaulieu	Acclaimed	

=== 2007 election ===
2007 Northwest Territories general election
Name	Vote	%
Tom Beaulieu	252	52.72%
Steve Ellis	175	36.61%
Raymond Simon	26	5.44%
Bobby J. Villeneuve	12	2.51%
Andrew Butler	6	1.26%
James W. McPherson	6	1.26%
Total Valid Ballots	477	99.79%
Voter Turnout 90.87%	Rejected Ballots 1	

=== 2003 election ===
2003 Northwest Territories general election
Name	Vote	%
Bobby J. Villeneuve	106	23.71%
Steven Nitah	82	18.34%
James Marlow	80	17.90%
Robert G. Sayine	55	12.30%
Maurice E. Boucher	49	10.96%
Wilfred M. Simon	44	9.84%
Felix Lockhart	31	6.94
Total Valid Ballots	447	100%
Voter Turnout 93.56%	Rejected Ballots 3	

=== 1999 election ===
1999 Northwest Territories general election
Name	Vote	%
Steven Nitah	210	43.21%
Sabet Biscaye	167	34.36%
Daniel Walton	80	16.46
Noel Villebrun	29	5.97%
Total Valid Ballots	486	100%
Voter Turnout 81.26%	Rejected Ballots 4	

== Notes ==
a: In the 2007 election, percentages assigned to candidates were based on the total votes cast. In prior elections the percentages were based on the valid votes.

== See also ==
- List of Northwest Territories territorial electoral districts
- Canadian provincial electoral districts
