= Glen Abernethy =

Canadian politician

The Honourable Glen Abernethy

Member of the Legislative Assembly of the Northwest Territories for Great Slave
- In office October 1, 2007 – September 2, 2019
- Preceded by: Bill Braden
- Succeeded by: Katrina Nokleby

Personal details
- Born: 1971 (age 54–55)
- Party: non-partisan consensus government

Glen Abernethy (born 1971) is a territorial level politician from Northwest Territories, Canada.

Abernethy ran as a candidate in the Great Slave electoral district in the 2007 Northwest Territories general election. He defeated four other candidates winning the district with 43% of the popular vote to earn his first term in office. He represented the district until the 2019 Northwest Territories general election, when he retired from politics and did not stand for reelection.
