= Olayuk Akesuk =

Canadian politician

Olayak Akesuk

MLA for South Baffin
- In office 1999–2008
- Preceded by: new district
- Succeeded by: Fred Schell

Personal details
- Born: 1965 (age 60–61) Cape Dorset, Eastern Northwest Territories, Canada
- Party: non-partisan consensus government

Olayuk Akesuk (born 1965) is a politician from Kinngait, Nunavut, Canada. Akesuk was the Member of the Legislative Assembly (MLA) for the electoral district of South Baffin from 1999 to 2008, having won the seat in the 1999 Nunavut election. He served as the minister of the environment, the minister responsible for the Workers Compensation Board, and the minister responsible for Nunavut housing.

In the first elections held in the newly created territory of Nunavut in 1999, Akesuk defeated Goo Arlooktoo, who had been deputy premier of the Northwest Territories, from which Nunavut had been split off. This was considered one of the biggest upsets of the election, as many people had expected Arlooktoo to become premier of Nunavut.

On 10 September 2008, Akesuk was appointed Health Minister after Leona Aglukkaq stepped down to run in the 2008 Canadian federal election for the Conservative Party.

Akesuk did not stand for re-election in the 2008 territorial election.
