= Nunakput =

Territorial electoral district in the Northwest Territories, Canada

Northwest Territories electoral district
- Boundaries of Nunakput

Territorial electoral district
- Legislature: Legislative Assembly of the Northwest Territories
MLA
Lucy Kuptana
- First contested: 1983
- Last contested: 2023
- Region: Inuvik Region
- Communities: Paulatuk, Sachs Harbour, Tuktoyaktuk, Ulukhaktok

Nunakput is a territorial electoral district for the Legislative Assembly of the Northwest Territories, Canada. Its name translates to "our land" in Inuvialuktun, and its area covers much of the Inuvialuit Settlement Region in Inuit Nunangat. The district consists of Paulatuk, Sachs Harbour, Tuktoyaktuk and Ulukhaktok.

== Members of the Legislative Assembly (MLAs) ==
Name	Elected	Left Office
District created from Western Arctic
Nellie Cournoyea	1983	1995
Vince Steen	1995	2003
Calvin P. Pokiak	2003	2007
Jackie Jacobson	2007	2015
Herbert Nakimayak	2015	2019
Jackie Jacobson	2019	2023
Lucy Kuptana	2023	present

== Election results ==
=== 2023 election ===
2023 Northwest Territories general election
Candidate	Votes	%
Lucy Kuptana	340	68.14
Vince Teddy	159	31.86
Total votes	499	

=== 2019 election ===
2019 Northwest Territories general election
Candidate	Votes
Jackie Jacobson	231
Herbert Nakimayak	143
Annie Steen	127
Holly Campbell	107
Sheila Nasogaluak	101
Alisa Blake	48

=== 2015 election ===
2015 Northwest Territories general election
Candidate	Votes	%
Herbert Nakimayak	229	30.8
Jackie Jacobson	225	30.2
Ethel-Jean Gruben	174	23.4
John Stuart Jr.	81	10.9
Robert Kuptana	35	4.7
Total valid ballots / Turnout	744	76%

=== 2011 election ===
2011 Northwest Territories general election
Candidate	Votes
Jackie Jacobson	312
Eddie Dillon	199

=== 2007 election ===
2007 Northwest Territories general election
Candidate	Votes	%
Jackie Jacobson	266	40.92%
Teddy J. Vince	150	23.08%
Eddie T. Dillon	142	21.85%
Calvin P. Pokiak	74	11.38%
Total valid ballots / Turnout	632	71.12%
Rejected ballots	18	
Source(s) "Official Voting Results 2007 General Election" (PDF). Elections NWT. Archived from the original (PDF) on 11 April 2008.

=== 2003 election ===
2003 Northwest Territories general election
Candidate	Votes	%
Calvin P. Pokiak	284	52.50%
Vince Steen	257	47.5%
Total valid ballots / Turnout	541	62.04%
Rejected ballots	0	
Source(s) "Official Voting Results 2003 General Election" (PDF). Elections NWT. Archived from the original (PDF) on 11 April 2008.

=== 1983 election ===
1983 Northwest Territories general election
Candidate	Votes
Nellie Cournoyea	Acclaimed

== See also ==
- List of Northwest Territories territorial electoral districts
- Canadian provincial electoral districts

== Notes ==
a: In the 2007 election, percentages assigned to candidates were based on the total votes cast. In prior elections the percentages were based on the valid votes.
