= Thebacha =

Territorial electoral district in the Northwest Territories, Canada

Northwest Territories electoral district
- Boundaries of Thebacha

Territorial electoral district
- Legislature: Legislative Assembly of the Northwest Territories
MLA
Jay MacDonald
- First contested: 1991
- Last contested: 2023
- Region: South Slave Region
- Communities: Fort Smith

Thebacha is a territorial electoral district for the Legislative Assembly of Northwest Territories, Canada. The district encompasses Fort Smith and its immediate surroundings.

== Members of the Legislative Assembly (MLAs) ==
Name	Elected	Left Office
District created from Slave River
Jeannie Marie-Jewell	1991	1995
Michael Miltenberger	1995	2015
Louis Sebert	2015	2019
Frieda Martselos	2019	2023
Jay MacDonald	2023	present

== Election results ==
=== 2023 election ===
2023 Northwest Territories general election
Candidate	Votes	%
Jay MacDonald	483	48.59
Frieda Martselos (I)	416	41.85
Connie Benwell	95	9.56
Total votes	994	

=== 2019 election ===
2019 Northwest Territories general election
Candidate	Votes
Frieda Martselos	504
Denise Yuhas	454
Don Jaque	139
Louis Sebert	70

=== 2015 election ===
2015 Northwest Territories general election
Candidate	Votes	%
Louis Sebert	401	42.8%
Michael Miltenberger	363	38.7
Don Jaque	173	18.5
Total valid ballots / Turnout	937	51%

=== 2011 election ===
2011 Northwest Territories general election
Candidate	Votes	%
Michael Miltenberger	526	
Peter Martselos	426	
Jeannie Marie-Jewell	263	

=== 2007 election ===
2007 Northwest Territories general election
Candidate	Votes	%
Michael Miltenberger	531	44.81%
Peter Martselos	444	37.47%
Jeannie Marie-Jewell	197	16.62%
Total valid ballots / Turnout	1,172	83.33%
Rejected ballots	13	
Source(s) "Official Voting Results 2007 General Election" (PDF). Elections NWT. Archived from the original (PDF) on 11 April 2008.

=== 2003 election ===
2003 Northwest Territories general election
Candidate	Votes	%
Michael Miltenberger	736	65.36%
Don M. Tourangeau	390	34.64%
Total valid ballots / Turnout	1,126	77.68%
Rejected ballots	5	
Source(s) "Official Voting Results 2003 General Election" (PDF). Elections NWT. Archived from the original (PDF) on 11 April 2008.

=== 1999 election ===
1999 Northwest Territories general election
Candidate	Votes	%
Michael Miltenberger	554	49.60%
Jeannie Marie-Jewell	471	42.17%
Marilyn Napier	92	8.24%
Total valid ballots / Turnout	1,117	83.90%
Rejected ballots	3	
Source(s) "Official Voting Results 1999 General Election" (PDF). Elections NWT. Archived from the original (PDF) on 11 April 2008.

== See also ==
- List of Northwest Territories territorial electoral districts
- Canadian provincial electoral districts

== Notes ==
a: In the 2007 election, percentages assigned to candidates were based on the total votes cast. In prior elections the percentages were based on the valid votes.
