= Paul Delorey =

Canadian curler (1949–2021)

12th Speaker of the Legislative Assembly of the Northwest Territories
- In office June 1, 2004 – October 3, 2011
- Preceded by: David Krutko
- Succeeded by: Jackie Jacobson

Member of the Legislative Assembly of the Northwest Territories for Hay River North
- In office December 6, 1999 – October 3, 2011
- Preceded by: Position established
- Succeeded by: Robert Bouchard

Personal details
- Born: Paul Alfred Delorey; May 3, 1949 Guysborough, Nova Scotia, Canada
- Died: January 1, 2021 (aged 71)
- Party: Consensus government
- Occupation: curler

Paul Alfred Delorey (May 3, 1949 – January 1, 2021) was a Canadian curler, territorial level politician, and speaker of the Northwest Territories (NWT) Legislature.

== Curling ==
Delorey was an avid curler. He represented the NWT/Yukon at the Canadian Mixed Curling Championships in 1987. In 1994, Team Paul Delorey finished in fifth place at the Canadian North Arctic Briar.

He was on Team Canada in the Strathcona Cup Championships in Scotland in 1998. He has coached junior curling for 22 years and was a fully qualified Level 2 coach. He also served as a director on the NWT Curling Association Board for three years and as the president of the Hay River Curling Club for five years. Delorey was a member of the Governor General's Curling Club of Canada.

== Politics ==
Delorey was elected to the Northwest Territories Legislature in the new electoral district of Hay River North for the 1999 Northwest Territories general election. He was re-elected to his second term by acclamation in the 2003 Northwest Territories general election. Delorey was elected to be the Speaker of the Northwest Territories Legislature on June 1, 2004. He was re-elected in the 2007 Northwest Territories general election.
