= Husky Lakes =

Group of lakes in the Northwest Territories, Canada

- Eskimo Lakes
- Imaryuk (Inuktitut)
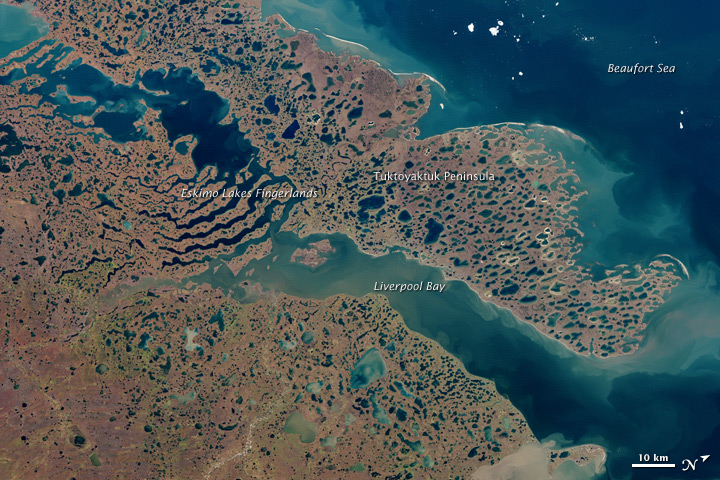
- Image of Tuktoyaktuk Peninsula and surrounding bodies of water (north is to the upper right), including the lower Husky Lakes near the top left corner. Both "finger" areas can be seen; the eastern area is labelled.

- Location in the Northwest Territories
- Location: Northwest Territories, Canada
- Coordinates: 69.25°N 132.29°W
- Primary inflows: Sitidgi Creek
- Primary outflows: Liverpool Bay, Beaufort Sea
- Catchment area: 9,543 km^{2} (3,685 sq mi)
- Basin countries: Canada
- Surface area: 1,933 km^{2} (746 sq mi)
- Average depth: 13 m (43 ft)
- Max. depth: 100 m (330 ft)

The Husky Lakes are a system of brackish estuarine basins in the Northwest Territories of Canada. Formerly known as the Eskimo Lakes, they are called Imaryuk in Inuvialuktun, the language of the Inuvialuit, the original inhabitants of the area.

The Husky Lakes form a chain of five basins draining toward the northeast and roughly coinciding with the Husky Lakes fault zone (formerly known as the Eskimo Lakes fault zone), which runs along a southwest–northeast axis through the region. The two lower basins are bracketed on either side by inundated tunnel valleys lying between "fingers" (narrow peninsulas) of land. Through the eastern "finger" region (Singiit in Inuvialuktun), the lakes empty into Liverpool Bay, an arm of the Beaufort Sea. Sitidgi Lake, a freshwater lake south of the Husky Lakes, drains into the southernmost basin through a shallow 6-kilometre (3.7 mi) channel called Sitidgi Creek. Together the basins cover an area of 1,933 square kilometres (746 sq mi) and drain an area of 9,543 square kilometres (3,685 sq mi). They average 13 metres (43 ft) in depth with maximum depths not exceeding 100 metres (330 ft). The Husky Lakes lie north of the tree line and vegetation in the area is that of typical Arctic tundra.

At Saunaktuk ("place of bones"), a site in the western "finger" area, remains of at least 35 Inuvialuit women, elderly and children were found dating to the 14th or 15th century. The remains exhibited signs of violence and possibly cannibalism, and are consistent with Inuvialuit oral histories describing a Dene attack at that site.

Today the area around the Husky Lakes remains culturally and economically important to the Inuvialuit of Tuktoyaktuk and Inuvik. In the spring, fishing for lake trout, lake whitefish, cod and pike is a major traditional source of food for the Inuvialuit. Bear, goose and duck are also hunted in the spring, but caribou hunting has recently been banned. Access to the area is more difficult in the summer after spring thaw, but this is likely to change after the opening of the extension of the Dempster Highway to Tuktoyaktuk, which passes near the western side of the southern lakes. Berry picking (cloudberry, crowberry, blueberry, cranberry) and ptarmigan hunting are popular activities in the fall, and trapping is practiced from late fall through early spring. Cabins have been built around the lakes and there is an outfitter lodge at Saunaktuk.
