= Bob Bromley (Canadian politician) =

Canadian politician

Member of the Legislative Assembly of the Northwest Territories
- In office October 1, 2007 – 2015
- Preceded by: Joe Handley
- Succeeded by: Riding dissolved
- Constituency: Weledeh

Personal details
- Born: Yellowknife, Northwest Territories
- Party: non-partisan consensus government

Robert Bromley is a Canadian politician. He represented the electoral district of Weledeh in the Legislative Assembly of the Northwest Territories. He was elected in the 2007 territorial election to succeed Joe Handley, who did not stand for re-election.
