= Leon Lafferty =

Canadian politician

Leon Lafferty is a municipal and a territorial level politician in Northwest Territories, Canada.

Lafferty ran for a seat in the Northwest Territories Legislature in the 1995 Northwest Territories general election. He was defeated by James Rabesca. He would run against Rabesca again in the 1999 Northwest Territories general election defeating Rabesca and former MLA Henry Zoe to win the North Slave district. Lafferty ran for re-election in the 2003 Northwest Territories general election but was defeated by Zoe.

After his defeat from the Legislature, Lafferty ran for the position of Chief of Behchokǫ̀ in the Executive Council for the Tłı̨chǫ nation Government, being elected on June 13, 2005.

Legislative Assembly of the Northwest Territories
Preceded by James Rabesca	MLA North Slave; 1999-2003	Succeeded by Henry Zoe
