= Jay MacDonald =

Canadian politician

Jay MacDonald MLA

Member of the Legislative Assembly of the Northwest Territories
- Incumbent
- Assumed office November 14, 2023
- Preceded by: Frieda Martselos
- Constituency: Thebacha

Member of the Executive Council of the Northwest Territories
- Incumbent
- Assumed office December 12, 2023

Personal details
- Born: June 24, 1964 (age 61) Hay River, Northwest Territories, Canada

Jay MacDonald (born June 26, 1964) is a Canadian politician, who was elected to the Legislative Assembly of the Northwest Territories in the 2023 election. He represents the electoral district of Thebacha.

He is a former municipal councillor and deputy mayor in Fort Smith.

== Election results ==
2023 Northwest Territories general election: Thebacha
Candidate	Votes	%
Jay MacDonald	483	48.59
Frieda Martselos (I)	416	41.85
Connie Benwell	95	9.56
Total votes	994	
