= Yellowknife East =

Territorial electoral district in the Northwest Territories, Canada

Northwest Territories electoral district
- Boundaries of Great Slave in Yellowknife

Territorial electoral district
- Legislature: Legislative Assembly of the Northwest Territories
MLA
Kate Reid
- First contested: 1975
- Last contested: 2023

Demographics
- Census subdivision: Yellowknife

Yellowknife East, formerly known as Great Slave, is a territorial electoral district for the Legislative Assembly of the Northwest Territories, Canada. It is one of seven districts that represent Yellowknife.

The district has existed twice, the first incarnation (under the district name of Great Slave Lake) existed from 1975 and was abolished in 1979 when it was split between Great Slave East and Rae-Lac La Martre. The second incarnation was created in 1999 from the old Yellowknife North riding. The district was renamed to Yellowknife East in 2026.

== Members of the Legislative Assembly (MLAs) ==
Name	Elected	Left Office
James Wah-Shee	1975	1979
Bill Braden	1999	2007
Glen Abernethy	2007	2019
Katrina Nokleby	2019	2023
Kate Reid	2023	present

== Election results ==
=== 2023 election ===
2023 Northwest Territories general election: Great Slave
Candidate	Votes	%
Kate Reid	263	34.79
Stacie Arden Smith	237	31.35
Katrina Nokleby (I)	197	26.06
James Lawrence	59	7.80
Total votes	756	

=== 2019 election ===
2019 Northwest Territories general election: Great Slave
Candidate	Votes
Katrina Nokleby	454
Patrick Scott	389

=== 2015 election ===
2015 Northwest Territories general election: Great Slave
Candidate	Votes	%
Glen Abernethy	511	79.1
Chris Clarke	135	20.9
Total valid ballots / Turnout	646	27%

=== 2011 election ===
2011 Northwest Territories general election: Great Slave
Candidate	Votes
Glen Abernethy	476
Patrick Scott	266

=== 2007 election ===
2007 Northwest Territories general election: Great Slave
Candidate	Votes	%
Glen Abernethy	336	43.58%
Doug Ritchie	206	26.72%
Christopher Hunt	103	13.36%
Beaton Mackenzie	101	13.10%
Mark Bogan	21	2.72%
Total valid ballots / Turnout	767	56.73%
Rejected ballots	4	
Source(s) "Official Voting Results 2007 General Election" (PDF). Elections NWT. Archived from the original (PDF) on 11 April 2008.

=== 2003 election ===
2003 Northwest Territories general election: Great Slave
Candidate	Votes	%
Bill Braden	420	64.52%
Karen Hamre	231	35.48%
Total valid ballots / Turnout	651	48.55%
Rejected ballots	1	
Source(s) "Official Voting Results 2003 General Election" (PDF). Elections NWT. Archived from the original (PDF) on 11 April 2008.

=== 1999 election ===
1999 Northwest Territories general election: Great Slave
Candidate	Votes	
Bill Braden	274	35.72%
Suzette Montreuil	152	19.82%
Marie Coe	150	19.56%
Bill Enge	144	18.78%
Roy Desjarlais	47	6.12%
Total valid ballots / Turnout	767	62.11%
Rejected ballots	5	
Source(s) "Official Voting Results 1999 General Election" (PDF). Elections NWT. Archived from the original (PDF) on 11 April 2008.

=== 1975 election ===
1975 Northwest Territories general election: Great Slave
Candidate	Votes
James Wah-Shee	Acclaimed
Source(s) "REPORT OF THE CHIEF ELECTORAL OFFICER ON FEDERAL BY-ELECTIONS, BY-ELECTIONS TO THE COUNCIL OF THE YUKON TERRITORY, AND NORTHWEST TERRITORIES COUNCIL GENERAL ELECTIONS HELD IN 1975" (PDF). Information Canada. 1976.

== Notes ==
a: In the 2007 election, percentages assigned to candidates were based on the total votes cast. In prior elections the percentages were based on the valid votes.

== See also ==
- List of Northwest Territories territorial electoral districts
- Canadian provincial electoral districts
