= Steven Nitah =

Canadian politician

Steven Nitah (born: ) is a former territorial level politician from Northwest Territories, Canada.

== Biography ==
Nitah first ran for a seat in the 1999 Northwest Territories general election. He ran in that election with the backing of former Premier Don Morin who had previously served in the riding of Tu Nedhe which Nitah won easily. He ran for re-election in the 2003 Northwest Territories general election but was defeated finishing second in a seven-way race by Bobby Villeneuve.

Nitah was investigated by the Conflict of Interest commissioner for claiming $21,000 housing allowances for a domicile in Yellowknife by falsifying that he lived in Lutselk'e, Northwest Territories. The complaints filed against him were dropped.

Legislative Assembly of the Northwest Territories
Preceded by Don Morin	MLA Tu Nedhe; 1999–2003	Succeeded by Bobby J. Villeneuve
