= Fred Schell =

Canadian politician

MLA for South Baffin
- In office 2008–2013
- Preceded by: Olayuk Akesuk
- Succeeded by: David Joanasie

Personal details
- Born: September 29, 1952 Winnipeg, Manitoba
- Died: June 7, 2021 (aged 68) Airdrie, Alberta
- Party: non-partisan consensus government

Fred Schell (September 29, 1952 – June 7, 2021) was a Canadian politician, who was elected as the Member of the Legislative Assembly for the electoral district of South Baffin in the Legislative Assembly of Nunavut at a by-election following the 2008 territorial election. The by-election was called as no candidate came forward during the general election. Prior to election as an MLA, Schell served as mayor of Cape Dorset.

Schell was the minister responsible for the Nunavut Housing Corp. and the Workers' Safety and Compensation Commission, and the minister responsible for homelessness. Nunavut Premier Eva Aariak removed all his ministerial portfolios effective March 11, 2012. Aariak did not give any specific reasons for removing Schell's portfolios, which were reassigned to other cabinet ministers.
