= Frieda Martselos =

Canadian politician

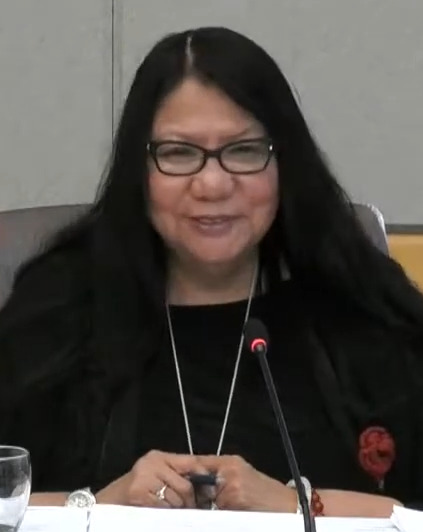
- Martselos in 2020

Member of the Legislative Assembly of the Northwest Territories
- In office October 1, 2019 – November 14, 2023
- Preceded by: Louis Sebert
- Succeeded by: Jay MacDonald
- Constituency: Thebacha

Personal details
- Party: non-partisan consensus government

Frieda Martselos is a Canadian politician, who represented the electoral district of Thebacha in the Legislative Assembly of the Northwest Territories from 2019 to 2023. She was first elected in the 2019 election, and was defeated by Jay MacDonald in the 2023 election.

== Election results ==
2023 Northwest Territories general election: Thebacha
Candidate	Votes	%
Jay MacDonald	483	48.59
Frieda Martselos (I)	416	41.85
Connie Benwell	95	9.56
Total votes	994	

2019 Northwest Territories general election: Thebacha
Candidate	Votes
Frieda Martselos	504
Denise Yuhas	454
Don Jaque	139
Louis Sebert	70
