= Bobby J. Villeneuve =

Canadian politician (born 1963)

Robert "Bobby" J. Villeneuve (born August 11, 1963 in Yellowknife, Northwest Territories) is a former member of the Northwest Territories Legislative Assembly and former retail manager.

Villeneuve was first elected to the Northwest Territories Legislature in the 2003 Northwest Territories general election defeating incumbent Steven Nitah to win the Tu Nedhe electoral district. He became mired in a scandal towards the end of his first term in office.

Villeneuve was disciplined by the Conflict of Interest commissioner in June 2007 after swearing a legal oath that he lived in Fort Resolution, Northwest Territories. Swearing the oath allowed him to gain access to a $25,000 a year capital housing allowance to provide for living accommodations in Yellowknife. The total estimated cost to tax payers was $65,000. He was forced to pay back $10,000 of it after it was determined he did not actually live in Fort Resolution.

He was defeated in his bid for re-election in the 2007 Northwest Territories general election. He finished with 2.5% of the vote, coming in a distant fourth place in a field of six candidates.

Legislative Assembly of the Northwest Territories
Preceded by Steven Nitah	MLA Tu Nedhe; 2003–2007	Succeeded by Tom Beaulieu
