= Don Morin =

Canadian politician

7th Premier of the Northwest Territories
- In office November 22, 1995 – November 26, 1998
- Commissioner: Helen Maksagak
- Preceded by: Nellie Cournoyea
- Succeeded by: Jim Antoine

MLA for Tu Nedhe
- In office October 5, 1987 – December 6, 1999
- Preceded by: Eliza Lawrence
- Succeeded by: Steven Nitah

Personal details
- Born: 1954 (age 71–72) Hay River, Northwest Territories, Canada

Don Albert Morin (born 1954 in Hay River, Northwest Territories) was the seventh premier of the Northwest Territories, Canada.

== Scandal ==
The initial complaints that led to the investigations by the ethics commissioner were filed with the Northwest Territories ethics commissioner by MLAs Jane Groenewegen and Jeannie Marie-Jewell. While Premier Morin was being investigated he and his lawyers tried to pressure the ethics commissioner into resigning her post.

Morin was forced to resign as Premier in 1998 after a scathing report was released over conflict of interest allegations involving the illegal shipment of government owned bison to a friend of the premier in 1996. In addition to those allegations he was also under investigation for having awarded a contract to lease to a Government of Northwest Territories Lahm Ridge Tower building to an associate.

After Morin resigned as Premier, senior cabinet minister and Deputy Premier Goo Arlooktoo automatically became acting Premier until Jim Antoine was elected. Morin served the rest of his term as a private member and retired when the legislature dissolved in 1999.

Legislative Assembly of the Northwest Territories
| Preceded by Eliza Lawrence | MLA Tu Nedhe; 1987–1999 | Succeeded by Steven Nitah |
| Preceded by Nellie Cournoyea | Premier of the Northwest Territories; 1995–1998 | Succeeded by Goo Arlooktoo |
