= Sahtu (electoral district) =

Territorial electoral district in the Northwest Territories, Canada

Coordinates: 65.327°N 126.761°W

Northwest Territories electoral district
- Boundaries of Sahtu

Territorial electoral district
- Legislature: Legislative Assembly of the Northwest Territories
MLA
Daniel McNeely
- First contested: 1983
- Last contested: 2023
- Region: Sahtu Region
- Communities: Colville Lake, Deline, Fort Good Hope, Norman Wells, Tulita

Sahtu is a territorial electoral district for the Legislative Assembly of Northwest Territories, Canada. The district is roughly coterminous with the Sahtu Region, consisting of Colville Lake, Deline, Fort Good Hope, Norman Wells and Tulita.

== Members of the Legislative Assembly (MLAs) ==
Name	Elected	Left Office
District created from Mackenzie Great Bear
John T'Seleie	1983	1987
Stephen Kakfwi	1987	2003
Norman Yakeleya	2003	2015
Daniel McNeely	2015	2019
Paulie Chinna	2019	2023
Daniel McNeely	2023	present

== Election results ==
=== 2023 election ===
2023 Northwest Territories general election
Candidate	Votes	%
Daniel McNeely	372	46.21
Paulie Chinna (I.C.)	226	28.07
Delphine (Dolly) Pierrot	207	25.71
Total votes	805	

=== 2019 election ===
2019 Northwest Territories general election
Candidate	Votes
Paulie Chinna	309
Daniel McNeely	287
Caroline Yukon	135
Wilfred McNeely Jr.	120

=== 2015 election ===
2015 Northwest Territories general election
Candidate	Votes	%
Daniel McNeely	271	29.6
Yvonne Doolittle	242	26.4
Judy Tutcho	229	25.0
Paul Andrew	175	19.1
Total valid ballots / Turnout	917	58%

=== 2011 election ===
2011 Northwest Territories general election
Candidate	Votes
Norman Yakeleya	463
Rocky Norwegian	312

=== 2007 election ===
2007 Northwest Territories general election
Candidate	Votes	%
Norman Yakeleya	Acclaimed	
Source(s) "Official Voting Results 2007 General Election" (PDF). Elections NWT. Archived from the original (PDF) on 11 April 2008.

=== 2003 election ===
2003 Northwest Territories general election
Candidate	Votes	%
Norman Yakeleya	414	45.59%
Judi M. Tutcho	210	23.13%
Larry M. Tourangeau	170	18.72%
Frank T'Seleie	81	8.92%
Lucy Jackson	33	3.63%
Total valid ballots / Turnout	908	77.35%
Rejected ballots	7	
Source(s) "Official Voting Results 2003 General Election" (PDF). Elections NWT. Archived from the original (PDF) on 11 April 2008.

=== 1999 election ===
1999 Northwest Territories general election
Candidate	Votes	%
Stephen Kakfwi	466	60.76%
Lennie Winter	301	39.24%
Total valid ballots / Turnout	767	60.32%
Rejected ballots	13	
Source(s) "Official Voting Results 1999 General Election" (PDF). Elections NWT. Archived from the original (PDF) on 11 April 2008.

== See also ==
- List of Northwest Territories territorial electoral districts
- Canadian provincial electoral districts

== Notes ==
a: In the 2007 election, percentages assigned to candidates were based on the total votes cast. In prior elections the percentages were based on the valid votes.
