= Louis Sebert (politician) =

Canadian politician

The Honourable Louis Sebert

Member of the Legislative Assembly of the Northwest Territories for Thebacha
- In office November 23, 2015 – September 2, 2019
- Preceded by: Michael Miltenberger
- Succeeded by: Frieda Martselos

Personal details
- Party: non-partisan consensus government

Louis Sebert is a Canadian politician, who was elected to the Legislative Assembly of the Northwest Territories in the 2015 election. He represented the electoral district of Thebacha until the 2019 election, when he was defeated by Frieda Martselos.
