= Tuktoyaktuk/James Gruben Airport =

Airport in the Northwest Territories, Canada

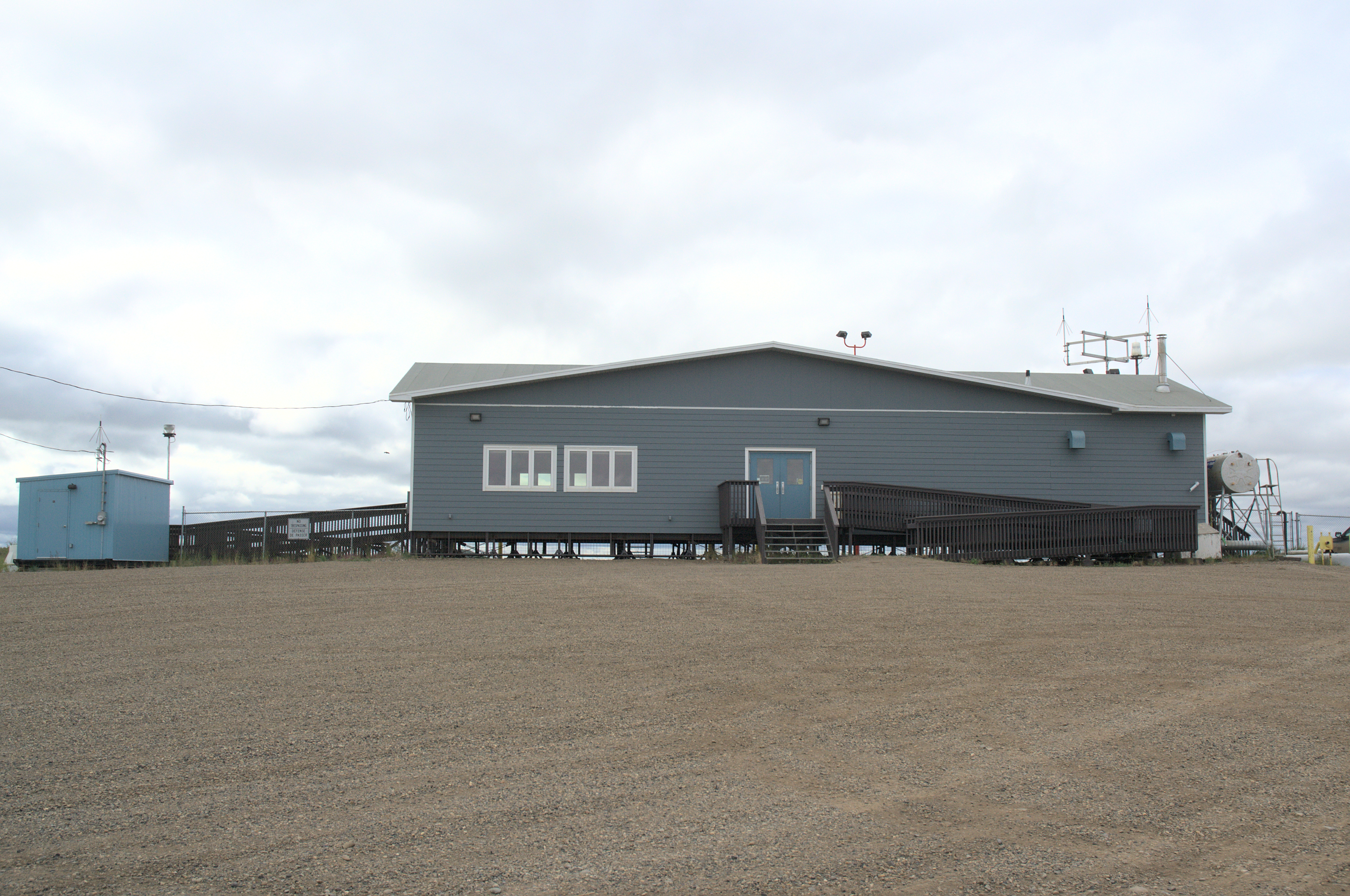
- IATA: YUB; ICAO: CYUB; WMO: 71985

Summary
- Airport type: Public
- Operator: Government of the Northwest Territories
- Location: Tuktoyaktuk, Northwest Territories
- Time zone: Northwest Territories Time (UTC−06:00)
- Elevation AMSL: 14 ft (4.3 m)
- Coordinates: 69°26′00″N 133°01′35″W

Map
- Location in the Northwest Territories CYUB (Canada)

Runways
Direction	Length		Surface
Direction	ft	m	Surface
11/29	4,600	1,402	Gravel

Statistics (2010)
- Aircraft movements: 2,356
- Sources: Canada Flight Supplement; Environment Canada movements from Statistics Canada

Tuktoyaktuk/James Gruben Airport (IATA: YUB, ICAO: CYUB) is near Tuktoyaktuk, Northwest Territories, Canada.

The airport was originally built to serve the Distant Early Warning Line site adjacent to Tuktoyaktuk. The site was chosen against the advice of local Inuvialuit, who warned that the site was prone to high water under certain conditions. The airstrip later had to be raised to prevent flooding. The airport was turned over to Transport Canada in 1973, bringing an end to military management and opening it up for regular civilian use.

The airport is classified as an airport of entry by Nav Canada and is staffed by the Canada Border Services Agency (CBSA). CBSA officers at this airport can handle general aviation aircraft only, with no more than 15 passengers. The airport previously had scheduled service from Inuvik operated by Aklak Air. Service was cancelled in 2018 after the opening of the Inuvik-Tuktoyaktuk Highway created a permanent link between the communities and resulted in a drop in demand for air service.

The airport is named for James Gruben, a local bush pilot/businessman who was killed on the ice road from Inuvik to Tuktoyaktuk on 13 April 2001. He was the owner of the only 100% Inuvialuit-owned transportation company, E. Gruben's Transport Ltd., which was passed down to him from his father Eddie Gruben and is still in business to this day.
