= Eliza Lawrence =

Canadian politician

Eliza Lawrence (November 11, 1935 – July 24, 2016) was a Canadian territorial-level politician and member of the Legislative Assembly of the Northwest Territories from 1983 until 1987.

Born in Fort Resolution, Northwest Territories in 1935, she was the third eldest in a family of 17 children. She helped care for her siblings and worked as a nurse and nutritional educator after training in what was then the capital of the NWT, Fort Smith. Her nursing work brought her to Fort Resolution, Edmonton, including three years at the cities Charles Camsell Hospital (1956–59) as a nursing assistant, and Yellowknife among other communities. At age 24, she met Harry Lawrence to whom she was married for 56 years, raising three daughters. She was one of the founders of the Native Women's Association of the NWT (1977), and a well-known dancer with the Métis Reelers. She loved to sew and people would congregate at her camping site at the Lac Ste. Anne pilgrimage where she would feed them her famous bannock. She was a descendant of the Métis leader François Beaulieu II. Proud of her Dënesųłiné heritage, she was a fluent speaker of the Chipewyan language.

Eliza Lawrence was elected to a seat in the Northwest Territories Legislature when she ran as a candidate in the 1983 Northwest Territories general election. She won the new electoral district of Tu Nedhe. She served a single term in the Legislative Assembly until 1987. After this, she worked as a manager in the territorial government.

She died on July 24, 2016, in Grande Prairie, Alberta, aged 80 years.

Legislative Assembly of the Northwest Territories
Preceded by New District	MLA Tu Nedhe; 1983–1987	Succeeded by Don Morin
