= Daniel McNeely =

Canadian politician

Member of the Legislative Assembly of the Northwest Territories for Sahtu
- In office November 23, 2015 – September 2, 2019
- Preceded by: Norman Yakeleya
- Succeeded by: Paulie Chinna

Member of the Legislative Assembly of the Northwest Territories for Sahtu
- Incumbent
- Assumed office November 14, 2023
- Preceded by: Paulie Chinna

Personal details
- Party: non-partisan consensus government

Daniel McNeely is a Canadian politician, who was elected to the Legislative Assembly of the Northwest Territories in the 2015 election. He represented the electoral district of Sahtu until the 2019 election, when he was defeated by Paulie Chinna. He won back the seat in the 2023 election.

== Election results ==
2023 Northwest Territories general election: Sahtu
Candidate	Votes	%
Daniel McNeely	372	46.21
Paulie Chinna (I.C.)	226	28.07
Delphine (Dolly) Pierrot	207	25.71
Total votes	805	

2019 Northwest Territories general election: Sahtu
Candidate	Votes
Paulie Chinna	309
Daniel McNeely	287
Caroline Yukon	135
Wilfred McNeely Jr.	120

2015 Northwest Territories general election: Sahtu
Candidate	Votes	%
Daniel McNeely	271	29.6
Yvonne Doolittle	242	26.4
Judy Tutcho	229	25.0
Paul Andrew	175	19.1
Total valid ballots / Turnout	917	58%
