= Weledeh =

Former territorial electoral district in the Northwest Territories, Canada

Weledeh (or Yellowknife - Weledeh) was a territorial electoral district for the Legislative Assembly of the Northwest Territories, Canada. It was one of seven districts that represent Yellowknife, and included the more rural communities of Dettah and N'Dilo.

The riding was dissolved for the 2015 election, with the Yellowknife portion transferred to a new district of Yellowknife North and the Dettah-N'Dilo portion merged with Tu Nedhe to create the new district of Tu Nedhé-Wiilideh.

== Members of the Legislative Assembly (MLAs) ==
Name	Elected	Left Office
Joe Handley	1999	2007
Bob Bromley	2007	2015

== Election results ==
=== 2011 election ===
2011 Northwest Territories general election
Name	Vote	%
Bob Bromley	624	
Mark Bogan	79	

=== 2007 election ===
2007 Northwest Territories general election
Name	Vote	%
Bob Bromley	522	43.07%
Andy Wong	409	33.75%
Jonas Sangris	244	20.13%
Carol Morin	34	2.81%
Total Valid Ballots	1,209	9.75%
Voter Turnout 80.11%	Rejected Ballots 3	

=== 2003 election ===
2003 Northwest Territories general election
Name	Vote	%
Joe Handley	Acclaimed	

=== 1999 election ===
1999 Northwest Territories general election
Name	Vote	%
Joe Handley	648	57.75%
Roy Erasmus	229	20.41%
Blake Rasmussen	123	10.96%
Mark Heyck	122	10.87%
Total Valid Ballots	1,122	100%
Voter Turnout 76.96%	Rejected Ballots 7	

== Notes ==
a: In the 2007 election, percentages assigned to candidates were based on the total votes cast. In prior elections the percentages were based on the valid votes.

== See also ==
- List of Northwest Territories territorial electoral districts
- Canadian provincial electoral districts
