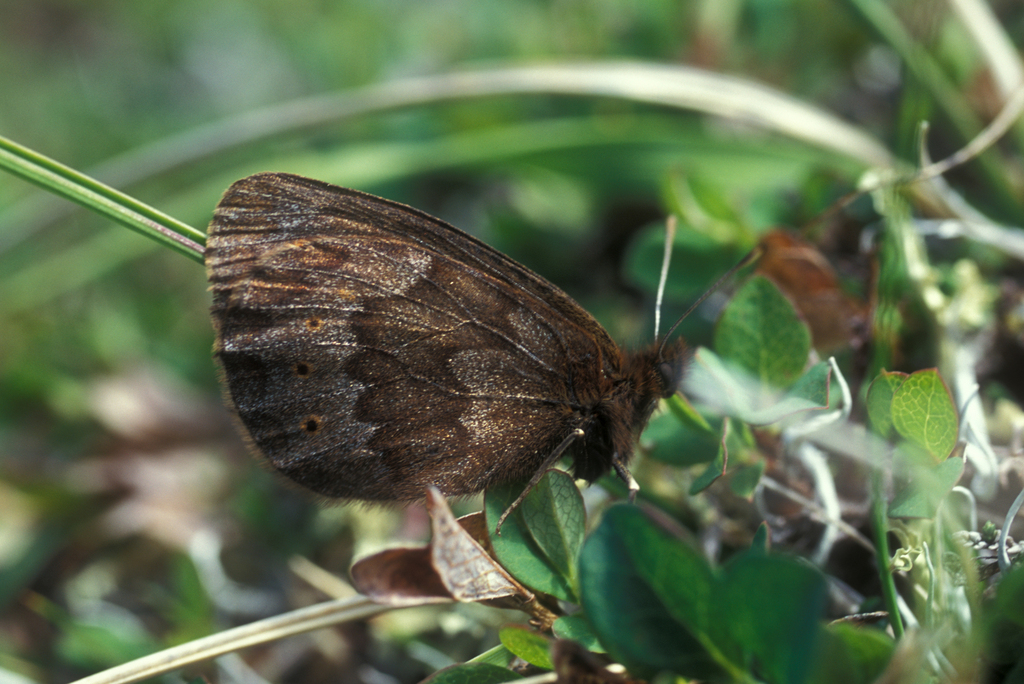

Scientific classification
- Kingdom: Animalia
- Phylum: Arthropoda
- Class: Insecta
- Order: Lepidoptera
- Family: Nymphalidae
- Genus: Erebia
- Species: E. anyuica

Binomial name
- Erebia anyuica Kurentzov, 1966

Subspecies
- Four, see text

= Erebia anyuica =

Scree alpine

Species of butterfly

Erebia anyuica, the scree alpine, is a member of the subfamily Satyrinae of family Nymphalidae. It is found in Siberia, in several isolated areas of Alaska, and in a band that extends across northern Alaska and northern Yukon (British Mountains) to the Richardson Mountains on the Yukon/Northwest Territories border.

The wingspan is 31–42 mm. Adults are on wing from mid-June to late July.

== Subspecies ==
- E. a. anyuica Magadan
- E. a. iltshira Belik, 1996 eastern Sayan Mountains
- E. a. jakuta Dubatolov, 1992 north-eastern Yakutia
- E. a. sokhondinka Dubatolov & Zintshenko, 1995

== Similar species ==
- Reddish alpine (E. lafontainei)
- Four-dotted alpine (E. youngi)
