= Paulie Chinna =

Canadian politician

Member of the Legislative Assembly of the Northwest Territories
- In office October 1, 2019 – November 14, 2023
- Preceded by: Daniel McNeely
- Succeeded by: Daniel McNeely
- Constituency: Sahtu

Member of the Executive Council of the Northwest Territories
- In office October 24, 2019 – December 7, 2023

Personal details
- Party: non-partisan consensus government

Paulie Chinna is a Canadian politician, who was elected to the Legislative Assembly of the Northwest Territories in the 2019 election. She represents the electoral district of Sahtu, and was selected to become part of Premier Caroline Cochrane's cabinet by her fellow 19th Assembly MLAs on October 24, 2019. Her Cabinet portfolio includes Minister of Municipal and Community Affairs, Minister of Housing, and Minister Responsible for Homelessness.

== Election results ==
2019 Northwest Territories general election: Sahtu
Candidate	Votes
Paulie Chinna	309
Daniel McNeely	287
Caroline Yukon	135
Wilfred McNeely Jr.	120

2023 Northwest Territories general election: Sahtu
Candidate	Votes	%
Daniel McNeely	372	46.21
Paulie Chinna (I.C.)	226	28.07
Delphine (Dolly) Pierrot	207	25.71
Total votes	805	
