= Tom Beaulieu =

Canadian politician

Member of the Legislative Assembly of the Northwest Territories for Tu Nedhe
- In office October 1, 2007 – 2015
- Preceded by: Bobby J. Villeneuve
- Succeeded by: riding redistributed

Member of the Legislative Assembly of the Northwest Territories for Tu Nedhé-Wiilideh
- In office October 1, 2015 – September 2, 2019
- Preceded by: first member
- Succeeded by: Steve Norn

Personal details
- Born: 1958 (age 67–68) Rocher River, Northwest Territories, Canada
- Party: non-partisan consensus government

Tom Beaulieu is a Canadian politician, who was a member of the Legislative Assembly of the Northwest Territories from 2007 to 2019.

Beaulieu began his political career serving on the Fort Resolution town council. He later became a deputy minister in the Northwest Territories government Housing Dept And served as the Cabinet minister for Health and Social Services and later shuffled to a cabinet minister for Infrastructure in his second term. .

Beaulieu was first elected to the territorial legislature in the 2007 Northwest Territories general election. He won the Tu Nedhe electoral district defeating incumbent Bobby J. Villeneuve with nearly 53% of the popular vote.

In 2015, he won reelection to the legislature in the new district of Tu Nedhé-Wiilideh. He retired from politics in 2019, and did not run for another term in the 2019 election.

In July 2024, Tom Beaulieu became the Administrator of Fort Resolution after the Government of the Northwest Territories removed the elected Mayor and City Council members. The NWT government said that the hamlet faced significant “financial and operational challenges” that must be addressed.
