= James Rabesca =

Canadian politician

James Rabesca (born July 14, 1944) is a former territorial level and current municipal level politician and Member of the Northwest Territories Legislature from 1995 until 1999.

Rabesca was elected to the Northwest Territories Legislature in the 1995 Northwest Territories general election winning the North Slave electoral district. He was defeated by Leon Lafferty in the 1999 Northwest Territories general election.

He currently served as the Behchokǫ̀ Representative in the Tłı̨chǫ Community Government, as well as an Interpreter.

Legislative Assembly of the Northwest Territories
Preceded by Henry Zoe	MLA North Slave; 1995-1999	Succeeded by Leon Lafferty
