= Michael Miltenberger =

Canadian carpenter and politician

J. Michael Miltenberger
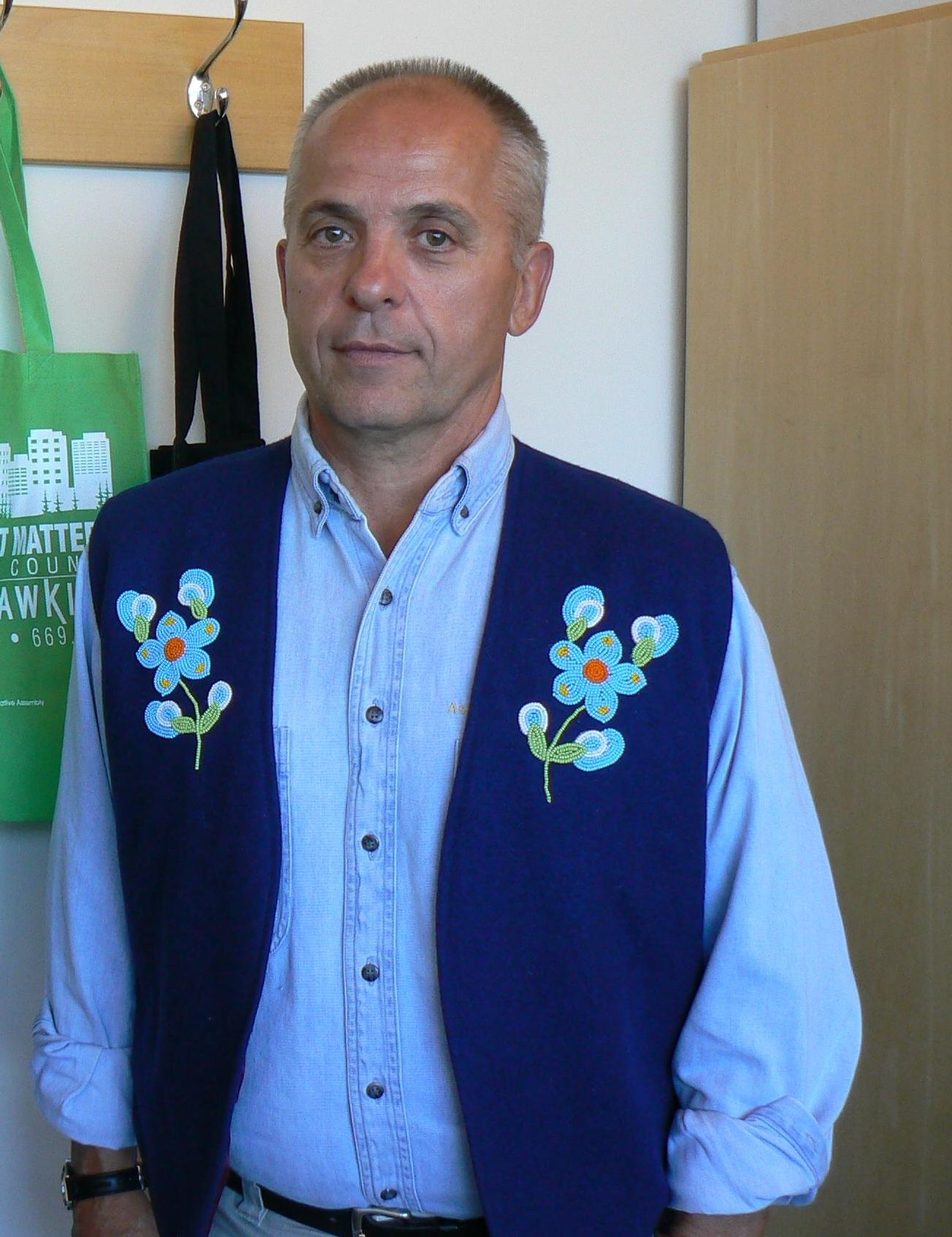
- Miltenberger in 2006

Member of the Legislative Assembly of the Northwest Territories for Thebacha
- In office October 16, 1995 – November 23, 2015
- Preceded by: Jeannie Marie-Jewell
- Succeeded by: Louis Sebert
- Constituency: Thebacha

Personal details
- Born: J. Michael Miltenberger; April 17, 1951 (age 75) Ottawa, Ontario
- Spouse: Jeri
- Children: Daughter
- Education: Arctic College
- Occupation: Carpenter
- Known for: Politician

J. Michael Miltenberger (born March 17, 1951, in Ottawa, Ontario, Canada) is a former carpenter and a former territorial level politician from northern Canada.

== Early life ==
J. Michael Miltenberger was born in Ottawa. His family moved to Northern Canada in 1962. He attended post secondary education at the University of Lethbridge and Arctic College.

== Political career ==
Miltenberger began his political career on the municipal level. He served on the town council including two years as mayor for the town of Fort Smith, Northwest Territories from 1983 to 1989.

Miltenberger first ran for a seat in the Northwest Territories Legislature in the 1995 Northwest Territories general election. He defeated former speaker and cabinet minister Jeannie Marie-Jewell to win his first term in office. He ran for re-election in the 1999 general election defeating Marie-Jewell for the second time. He was appointed to the executive council as the Minister of Health and Social Services.

Miltenberger ran for a third term in the 2003 general election, he solidified his popularity winning his district with 65% of the vote over challenging candidate Don Torangeau.

After serving as finance minister and environment minister, Miltenberger sought a record sixth term in the 2015 general election, but was defeated.

== Human rights complaint ==
A human rights complaint was filed against Miltenberger in connection with a December 9, 2011, incident in which a trans woman alleged that the Government of the Northwest Territories and Miltenberger denied her access to facilities customarily available to the public – Aurora College - because she is transgender. In 2013, the Northwest Territories Human Rights Commission found that gender-identity was not a factor in the matter, that there was no connection between Miltenberger's words or actions and the complainant's transness, and that while the complainant was denied access to school facilities, the denial was not related to her gender identity. Her complaint was dismissed.
