= Bill Braden =

Canadian politician and news reporter

Bill Braden (born 1954) is a former politician and former news reporter in Northwest Territories, Canada and a former member of the Legislative Assembly of Northwest Territories.

== Biography ==
Braden was born in Rosthern, Saskatchewan. After graduating high school in 1972, Bill worked for a number of different news papers including the Edmonton Journal.

Bill has been active in the political scene since 1970 and is a member of the Liberal Party of Canada.

Bill Braden was first elected in the Yellowknife riding of Great Slave in the 1999 Northwest Territories general election and was re-elected in the 2003 Northwest Territories general election. He retired from territorial politics at the dissolution of the Legislature in 2007.

He is the brother of former Northwest Territories premier George Braden.

After serving several years as an MLA in the territories, Bill attended VanArts to study Digital Photography.

Bill also landed the opportunity to write his first book, as a corporate publication for diamond mines in the Northwest Territories. This book came out in 2011 and was titled "On Good Ice: Lifeline to Gold, Diamonds and the Future. The Evolution of Canada's Arctic Ice Road".

Legislative Assembly of the Northwest Territories
Preceded by James Wah-Shee	MLA Great Slave; 1999-2007	Succeeded by Glen Abernethy
