= Goo Arlooktoo =

Canadian politician

Acting Premier of the Northwest Territories
- In office November 26, 1998 – December 10, 1998
- Prime Minister: Jean Chrétien
- Commissioner: Helen Maksagak
- Preceded by: Don Morin
- Succeeded by: Jim Antoine

MLA for Baffin South
- In office October 16, 1995 – December 6, 1999
- Preceded by: Joe Arlooktoo
- Succeeded by: district abolished

Personal details
- Born: November 28, 1963 Lake Harbour, Northwest Territories (now Nunavut), Canada
- Died: April 30, 2002 (aged 38) Iqaluit, Nunavut, Canada
- Party: Independent
- Relations: Joe Arlooktoo (father)

Gooteleah "Goo" "Mosa" Arlooktoo (November 28, 1963 – April 30, 2002) was an Inuk Canadian politician and former cabinet minister from the Northwest Territories, Canada. He briefly served as acting premier of the territory.

== Political career ==
Arlooktoo was first elected to the Northwest Territories legislature in the 1995 Northwest Territories general election. He won the electoral district of Baffin South. In his first term in office he was appointed to the cabinet becoming Minister of Justice and Housing and Deputy Premier.

Arlooktoo became Acting Premier after the sudden resignation of Premier Don Morin who resigned over conflict of interest allegations. He served in this capacity from November 26 until December 10, 1998 when then Legislative Assembly chose Jim Antoine to lead the government.

Arlooktoo left the Northwest Territories legislature when the territory of Nunavut was created to run in the 1999 Nunavut general election. He was considered very likely to become Premier in the new territory, however he was defeated by Olayuk Akesuk in an upset. Arlooktoo himself finished a close second.

== Late life ==
After his defeat for the Nunavut Legislature he became assisted the fledgling government by holding orientations to help train newly elected members in the territory to assist them in performing their duties. He then became Executive Director of the Qikiqtaaluk Wildlife Board which he held until his death in 2002.

He died suddenly of a heart attack at his home at the age of 38 on April 30, 2002. Arlooktoo's father Joe Arlooktoo also served as a Member of the Northwest Territories Legislature.

Legislative Assembly of the Northwest Territories
Preceded by Kenoayoak Pudlat	MLA Baffin South; 1995–1999	Succeeded by District Abolished
Preceded by Don Morin	acting Premier of Northwest Territories; 1998	Succeeded by Jim Antoine
