= Joe Arlooktoo =

Canadian artist and politician (1939–2025)

Member of the Northwest Territories Legislative Assembly from Baffin South
- In office 1979–1991
- Preceded by: Bryan Pearson
- Succeeded by: Kenoayoak Pudlat

Mayor of Kimmirut
- In office 2000–2008
- Preceded by: Mickey Akavak
- Succeeded by: Jamesie Kootoo

Personal details
- Born: June 26, 1939
- Died: December 2025 (aged 86)
- Children: 9, including Goo
- Profession: Visual artist

Joe Arlooktoo (June 26, 1939 – December 2025) was a Canadian visual artist, adept at soapstone and ivory carving, and a municipal and territorial-level politician who was a member of the Northwest Territories Legislature from 1979 until 1991. He was later a councillor in Kimmirut, Nunavut.

== Biography ==
Arlooktoo ran for a seat in the Northwest Territories Legislature in the 1979 Northwest Territories general election winning the Baffin South electoral district. He was re-elected to a second term in the 1983 Northwest Territories general election. He served a third term and final term being returned in the 1987 Northwest Territories general election. Arlooktoo was defeated by Kenoayoak Pudlat in the 1991 Northwest Territories general election.

After his defeat from the Northwest Territories Legislature, Arlooktoo was elected as mayor of Kimmirut, Nunavut. in 2000. He was re-elected to another term as mayor in 2004.

Arlooktoo died in December 2025, at the age of 86. His son, Goo Arlooktoo, also served in the Northwest Territories Legislature, from 1995 until 1999.

Legislative Assembly of the Northwest Territories
Preceded by Bryan Pearson	MLA Baffin South; 1979–1991	Succeeded by Kenoayoak Pudlat
