= Katrina Nokleby =

Canadian politician

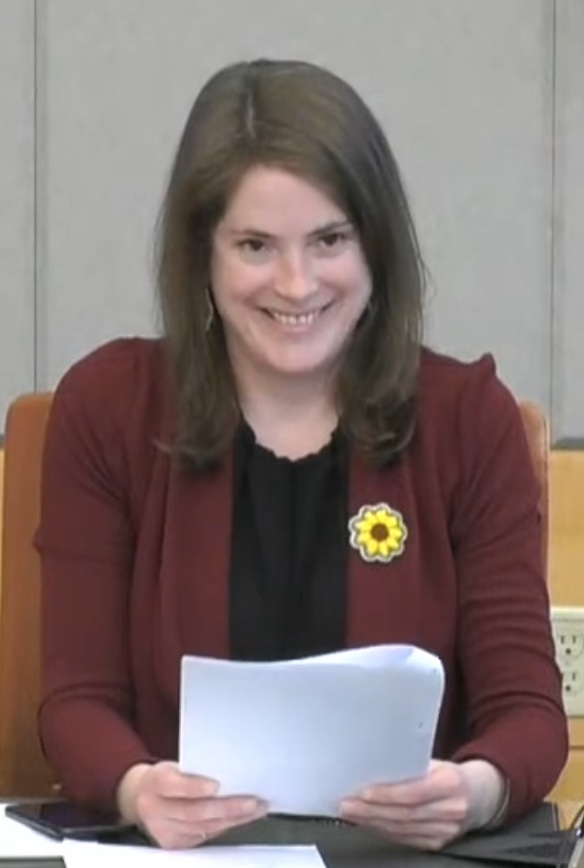

Member of the Legislative Assembly of the Northwest Territories
- In office October 1, 2019 – November 14, 2023
- Preceded by: Glen Abernethy
- Succeeded by: Kate Reid
- Constituency: Great Slave

Member of the Executive Council of the Northwest Territories
- In office October 24, 2019 – August 26, 2020

Personal details
- Party: non-partisan consensus government

Katrina Nokleby is a Canadian politician, who was elected to the Legislative Assembly of the Northwest Territories in the 2019 election. She represented the electoral district of Great Slave, and she was elected to the territorial executive committee on October 24, 2019. Until August 2020 her Cabinet portfolio included Minister of Infrastructure, Minister of Industry, Tourism and Investment, and Minister Responsible for the Workers' Safety and Compensation Commission, but was removed from such ministerial positions by Premier Caroline Cochrane citing a “failure to manage her office”. On August 26, 2020 the Legislative Assembly voted 16 to 1 (with one abstention) to remove Ms. Nokelby from cabinet.

Ms. Nokleby was born in Matsqui, BC and currently resides in the Great Slave riding in Yellowknife, NT. Prior to moving to Yellowknife, Ms. Nokleby taught English overseas in South Korea for three one-year contracts. She used the time between work terms to travel within Asia including Cambodia, Japan, and China.

Ms. Nokleby has a Bachelor of Applied Science as a Geological Engineer.

Ms, Nokleby was a Councilor for the NT and NU Association of Professional Engineers and Geoscientists and was the President (2015-2017) and Secretary (2012-2014) of the Association of Consulting Engineering Companies in the Northwest Territories.

Since 2006, Ms. Nokleby has worked in Yellowknife as a consultant in the environmental, earthworks, and ice engineering fields where she travelled extensively to sites throughout the Northwest Territories, Nunavut, and Yukon.

Ms. Nokleby has been a leader with the Girl Guides of Canada since 2007, was the Director of YWCA NWT from 2015 to 2019, and has volunteered at a variety of local events in Yellowknife like Folk on the Rocks, Pride, North Slave Métis Fish Fry, Long John Jamboree, etc.

Ms. Nokleby enjoys travel, playing soccer and slopitch, board games and crosswords

After a controversial term as MLA, Nokleby was defeated in her bid for reelection, placing third.

== Election results ==
2023 Northwest Territories general election: Great Slave
Candidate	Votes	%
Kate Reid	263	34.79
Stacie Arden Smith	237	31.35
Katrina Nokleby (I)	197	26.06
James Lawrence	59	7.80
Total votes	756	

2019 Northwest Territories general election: Great Slave
Candidate	Votes
Katrina Nokleby	454
Patrick Scott	389
