= Jackson Lafferty =

Canadian politician (born 1969)

Jackson Lafferty MLA

Member of the Legislative Assembly of the Northwest Territories for Monfwi North Slave (2015)
- In office July 18, 2005 – June 4, 2021
- Preceded by: Henry Zoe
- Succeeded by: Jane Weyallon Armstrong

14th Speaker of the Legislative Assembly of the Northwest Territories
- In office November 23, 2015 – October 24, 2019
- Preceded by: Jackie Jacobson
- Succeeded by: Frederick Blake Jr.

Personal details
- Born: October 9, 1969 (age 57) Rae Lakes, Northwest Territories, Canada
- Party: Independent

Jackson Lafferty (born October 9, 1969) is a Canadian and former territorial-level politician and current Grand Chief of the Tłı̨chǫ Government.

== Early life ==
Lafferty attended Sir John Franklin High School in Yellowknife, Northwest Territories. He received his post-secondary education at Red Deer College and the University of Lethbridge, completed a Management Degree at Athabasca University. He also complete the Executive Leadership program through the Banff School of Management.

== Political career ==
Lafferty ran for a seat in the Northwest Territories Legislature in a by-election held in the electoral district of North Slave on July 15, 2005. He won the by-election in a closely contested race over two other candidates. He defeated former North Slave MLA Henry Zoe in the 2007 Northwest Territories general election. He was elected to cabinet by his colleagues in the Legislative Assembly. Premier Floyd Roland appointed him Minister of Education, Culture and Employment, as well as Minister of Justice.

Lafferty was re-elected to the 17th Assembly in 2011. During the 17th Legislative Assembly, Lafferty was the Deputy Premier, Minister of Education, Culture and Employment, Minister Responsible for Official Languages, and Minister Responsible for the Workers’ Safety and Compensation Commission.

Lafferty was acclaimed to the 18th Legislative Assembly in November 2015, and was elected by his peers to be the Speaker of the 18th Legislative Assembly. He was acclaimed to the 19th Northwest Territories Legislative Assembly in October 2019 representing the constituency of Monfwi.

Lafferty resigned his position on June 4, 2021 and announced his intention to run for Tłı̨chǫ Grand Chief later that year.
