= Joe Handley =

Canadian politician

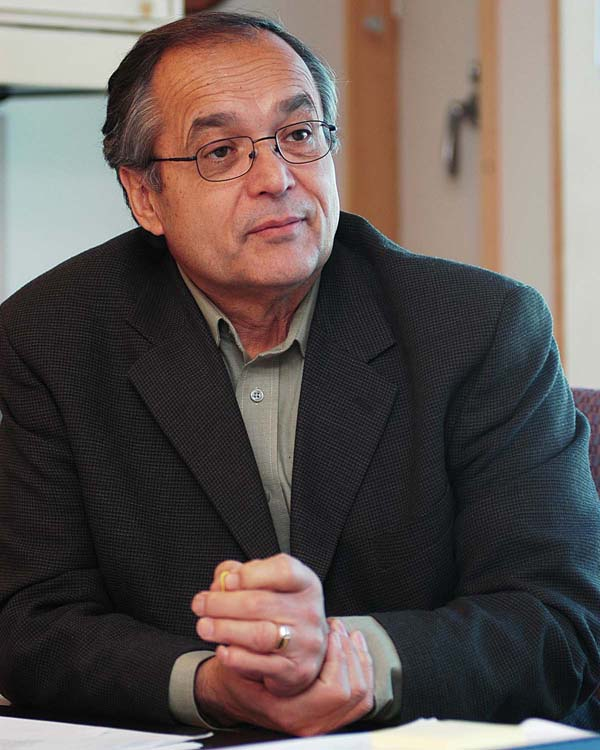
- Hon. Joseph Handley

10th Premier of the Northwest Territories
- In office December 10, 2003 – October 16, 2007
- Commissioner: Glenna Hansen; Tony Whitford
- Preceded by: Stephen Kakfwi
- Succeeded by: Floyd Roland

MLA for Weledeh
- In office December 6, 1999 – October 1, 2007
- Preceded by: first member
- Succeeded by: Bob Bromley

Personal details
- Born: August 9, 1943 (age 82) Meadow Lake, Saskatchewan
- Party: Independent
- Spouse: Theresa Handley

Joseph "Joe" L. Handley, MLA (born August 9, 1943), is a former teacher, politician and civil servant and was the tenth premier of the Northwest Territories.

== Early life ==
Handley was born in Meadow Lake, Saskatchewan in 1943. Prior to moving to the Northwest Territories in 1985, he worked as an educator.

Handley joined the Northwest Territories government and served as Deputy Minister in a wide number of portfolios including Deputy Minister of Education, Deputy Minister for the Departments of Renewable Resources, the NWT Housing Corporation, Transportation and Resources, Wildlife, and Economic Development. He left his career as a Deputy Minister to run for election in 1999.

== Electoral career ==
Handley ran for election to the Northwest Territories Legislature in the electoral district of Weledeh in the 1999 Northwest Territories general election. He easily defeated incumbent MLA Roy Erasmus. In his first term in office he became Minister of Finance, Chairman of the Financial Management Board, Minister Responsible for the Workers Compensation Board, Minister of Transportation, and Minister Responsible for the Northwest Territories Power Corporation.

Handley was returned to his seat by acclamation, running unopposed in the 2003 territorial election. After the assembly convened to pick a new Premier following the retirement of Stephen Kakfwi, Handley ran unopposed for premier. His colleagues in the Legislature, acclaimed him to that position on December 10, 2003.

Handley served one term as premier and did not run in the election held on October 1, 2007.

In March 2009, Handley expressed an interest in running for the Liberals under Michael Ignatieff in the 2011 federal election in the Western Arctic riding. Handley ran for the Liberals and placed third, receiving 2,872 votes.

Legislative Assembly of the Northwest Territories
Preceded by New District	MLA Weledeh; 1999–2007	Succeeded by Bob Bromley
Preceded by Stephen Kakfwi	Premier of Northwest Territories; 2003–2007	Succeeded by Floyd Roland
