= Tuktoyaktuk =

Hamlet in the Northwest Territories, Canada

Tuktoyaktuk Tuktuyaaqtuuq (Inuvialuktun) Port Brabant (formerly)
- Hamlet
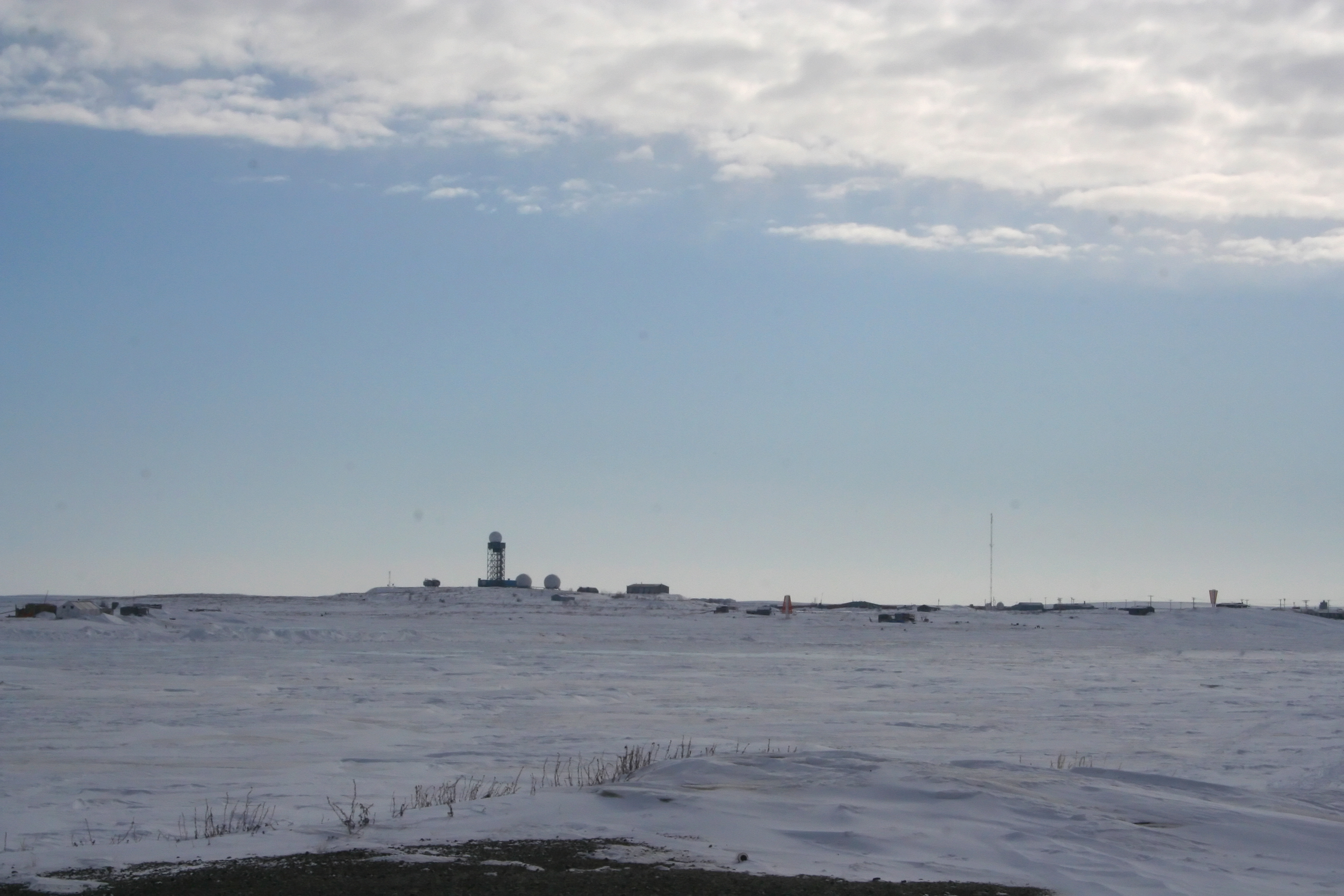
- North Warning System radar station at Tuktoyaktuk

- Seal
- Nickname: Tuk
- Location within Northwest Territories Location within Canada
- Coordinates: 69°27′03″N 133°02′09″W
- Country: Canada
- Territory: Northwest Territories
- Region: Inuvik Region
- Electoral district: Nunakput
- Census division: Region 1
- Settled: 1928
- Incorporated: 1 April 1970

Government
  - Mayor: Erwin Elias
  - Senior Administrative Officer: Holly Campbell
  - MLA: Lucy Kuptana
  - Member of Parliament: Michael McLeod
  - Senator: Margaret Dawn Anderson

Area (2021)
  - Land: 12.66 km^{2} (4.89 sq mi)
- Elevation: 4.6 m (15 ft)

Population (2021)
  - Total: 937
  - Density: 74/km^{2} (190/sq mi)
- Time zone: UTC−06:00 (Northwest Territories Time)
- Canadian Postal code: X0E 1C0
- Area code: 867
- Telephone exchange: 977
  - Living cost (2018): 162.5^{A}
  - Food price index (2019): 157.8^{B}
- Website: http://www.tuktoyaktuk.ca
- Sources: Department of Municipal and Community Affairs, Prince of Wales Northern Heritage Centre, Canada Flight Supplement; Northwestel; Natural Resources Canada^A2018 figure based on Edmonton = 100^B2019 figure based on Yellowknife = 100

Tuktoyaktuk (/ˌtʌktəˈjæktʌk/ TUK-tə-YAK-tuk; Inuvialuktun: Tuktuyaaqtuuq [təktujaːqtuːq], lit. 'it looks like a caribou') is an Inuvialuit hamlet near the Mackenzie River delta in the Inuvik Region of the Northwest Territories, Canada, at the northern terminus of the Inuvik–Tuktoyaktuk Highway. One of six Inuvialuit communities in the Inuvialuit Settlement Region, it is commonly known by its first syllable, Tuk (/tʌk/). It lies north of the Arctic Circle on the Arctic Ocean, and is the only place on the Arctic Ocean connected to the rest of Canada by road. Known as Port Brabant after British colonization, in 1950 it became Canada's first Indigenous settlement to reclaim its traditional name.

== History ==
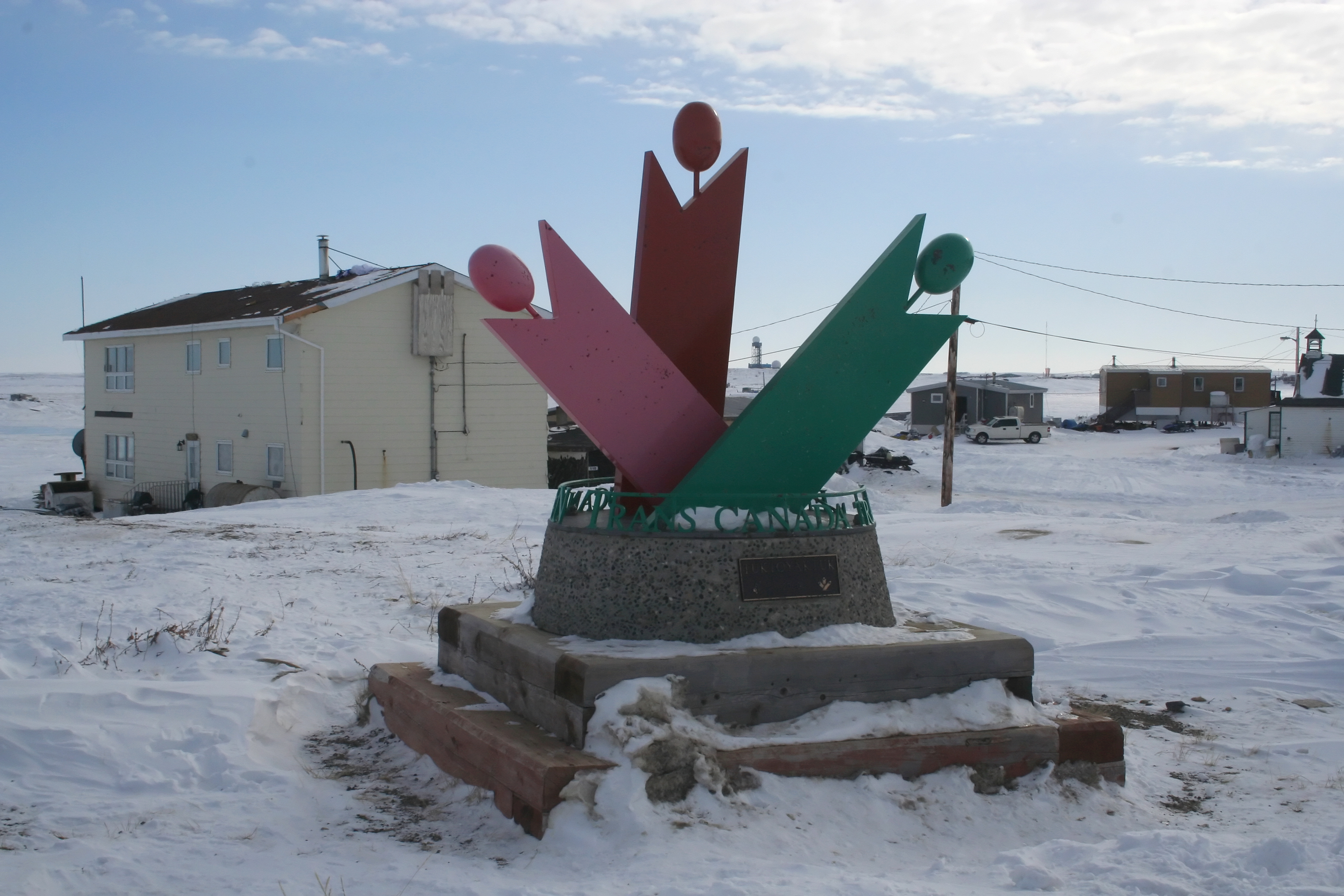
Trans Canada Trail sign in Tuk

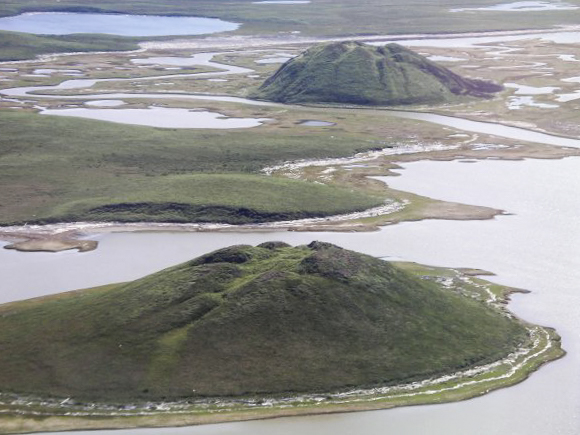
Pingo near Tuktoyaktuk, Northwest Territories

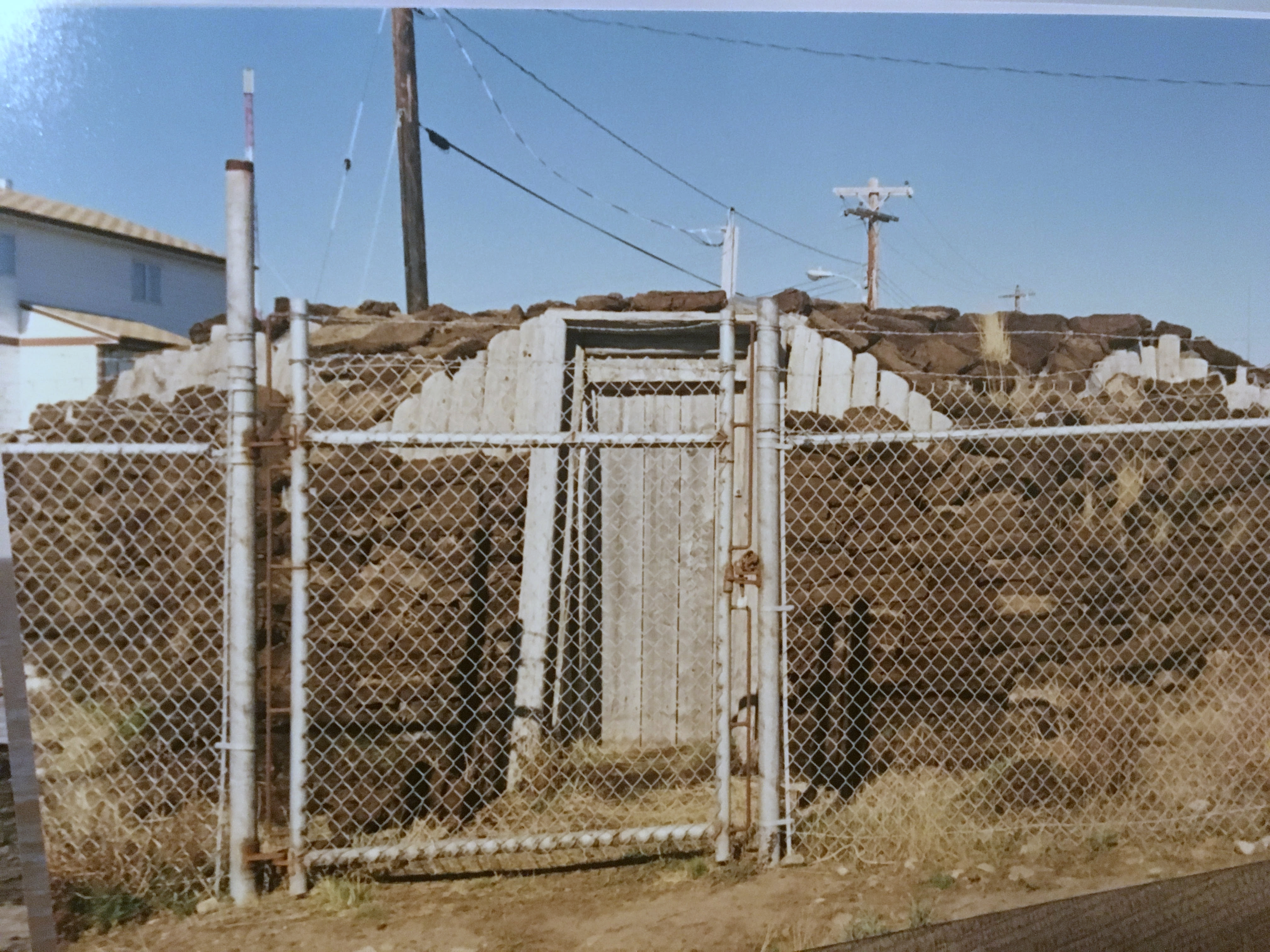
Tuktoyaktuk Community Cooler

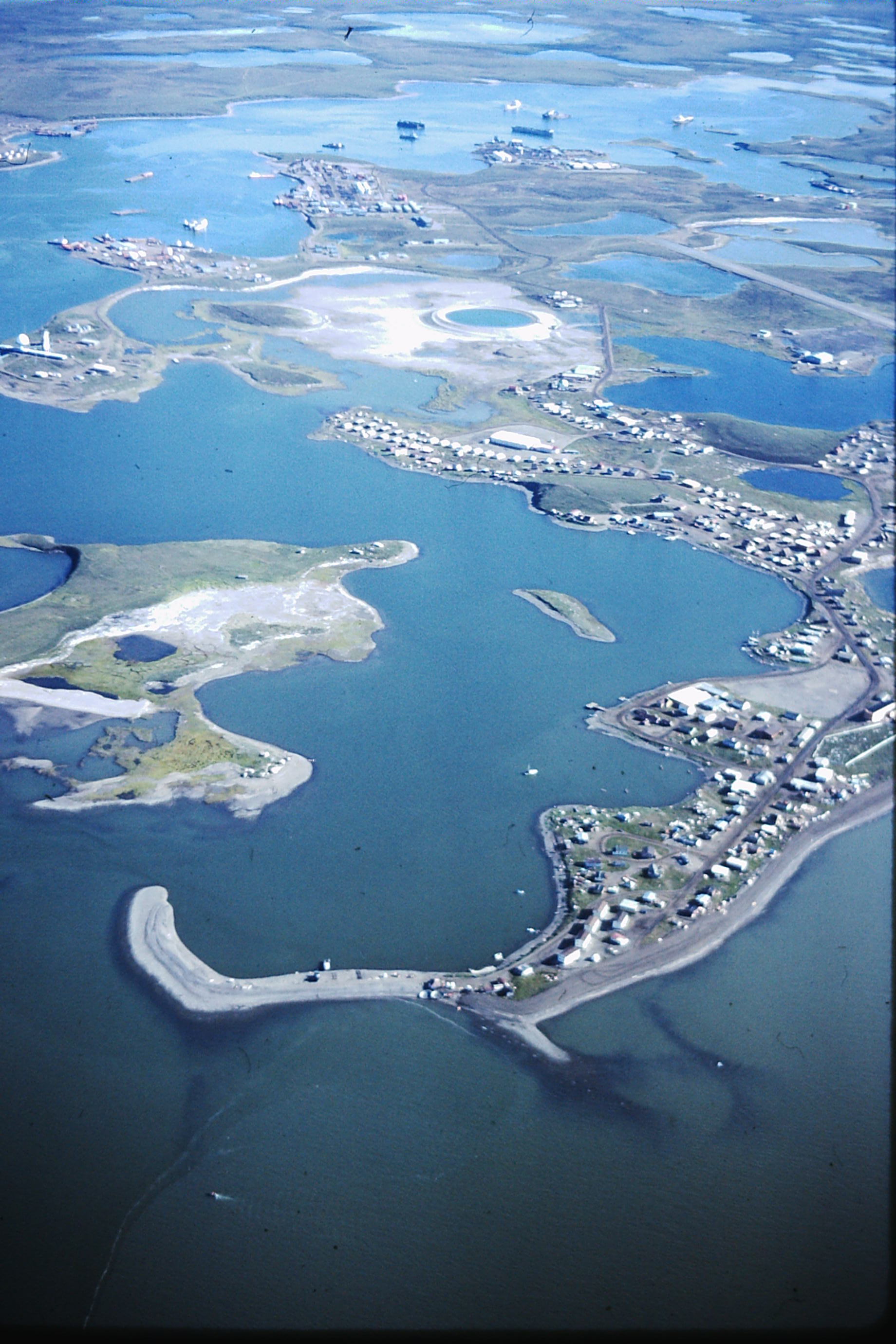
Tuktoyaktuk, aerial photo 1987

Tuktoyaktuk is the anglicized form of the native Inuvialuit place-name, meaning "resembling a caribou". According to legend, a woman looked on as some caribou, common at the site, waded into the water and turned into stone. Today, reefs resembling petrified caribou are said to be visible at low tide along the shore of the town.

Although no formal archaeological sites exist today, the Inuvialuit have used the settlement for centuries as a place to harvest caribou and beluga whales. Tuktoyaktuk's natural harbour was also historically used to transport supplies to other Inuvialuit settlements.

Between 1890 and 1910, many of Tuktoyaktuk's native families were wiped out in flu epidemics brought in by American whalers. In subsequent years, the Dene people, as well as residents of Herschel Island, settled here. By 1937, the Hudson's Bay Company had established a trading post. On 9 September 1944, a windstorm blew through the community, severely damaged several buildings and schooners docked at the harbour, and killed 11 people en route back from a reindeer station on the Anderson River on the schooner Cally.

Radomes were installed beginning in the 1950s as part of the Distant Early Warning Line, to monitor air traffic and detect possible Soviet intrusions during the Cold War. The settlement's location (and harbour) made Tuk important in resupplying the civilian contractors and Air Force personnel along the DEW Line. In 1947, Tuktoyaktuk became the site of one of the first government day schools, designed to forcibly assimilate Inuit youth into mainstream Canadian culture.

Tuktoyaktuk eventually became a base for the oil and natural gas exploration of the Beaufort Sea. Large industrial buildings remain from the busy period following the Organization of Arab Petroleum Exporting Countries 1973 oil embargo and 1979 summertime fuel shortage. This brought many more outsiders into the region.

In late 2010, the Canadian Environmental Assessment Agency announced that it would undertake an environmental study of a proposed all-weather road between Inuvik and Tuktoyaktuk. Work on the Inuvik–Tuktoyaktuk Highway started on 8 January 2014, and the highway opened on 15 November 2017.

== Geography ==
Tuktoyaktuk is on Kugmallit Bay, near the Mackenzie River Delta, and is on the Arctic tree line.

Tuktoyaktuk is the gateway for exploring Pingo Canadian Landmark, an area protecting eight nearby pingos in a region that contains about 1,350 of these Arctic ice-dome hills. The landmark comprises an area roughly 16 km^{2} (6.2 sq mi), just a few kilometres west of the community, and includes Ibyuk Pingo, Canada's highest, and the world's second-highest, pingo, at 49 m (161 ft).

== Employment ==
Many residents continue traditional activities such as hunting, fishing, and trapping. Hunting caribou occurs in the autumn, ducks and geese in both spring and autumn, while fishing takes place all year-round. Other activities include collecting driftwood, berry picking, and reindeer herding. Most productivity today comes from tourism and transportation. Marine Transportation Services (MTS) is a major employer in the region, and the fossil fuel industry continues to employ explorers and other workers.

In 1962, the government-sponsored Tuktoyaktuk Fur Garment Project started; it provided vocational training in industrial sewing and commercial production of items for sale, including parkas, mitts, slippers, mukluks, hats, wall hangings, place mats and dolls produced by local women that were sold in the Tuktoyaktuk Fur Garment Shop. The shop closed in the 1980s.

== Demographics ==
Federal census population history of Tuktoyaktuk
Year	Pop.	±%
1971	597	—
1976	590	−1.2%
1981	772	+30.8%
1986	929	+20.3%
1991	918	−1.2%
1996	943	+2.7%
2001	930	−1.4%
2006	870	−6.5%
2011	854	−1.8%
2016	898	+5.2%
2021	937	+4.3%
Source: Statistics Canada

In the 2021 Canadian census conducted by Statistics Canada, Tuktoyaktuk had a population of 937 living in 285 of its 334 total private dwellings, a change of 4.3% from its 2016 population of 898. With a land area of 12.66 km^{2} (4.89 sq mi), it had a population density of 74.0/km^{2} (191.7/sq mi) in 2021.

The average annual personal income in 2015 was $21,984 Canadian and the average family income was $55,424. Local languages are Inuinnaqtun (Inuvialuktun) and English with a few North Slavey and Tłı̨chǫ (Dogrib) speakers. Tuktoyaktuk is predominately Indigenous (90.8%) with Inuit (Inuvialuit) making up 88.0%, 1.7% First Nations and 1.1% giving multiple Indigenous backgrounds. The remaining 9.2% identify as non-Aboriginal.

Annual population estimates

Year	Pop.	±%
1996	971	—
1997	964	−0.7%
1998	981	+1.8%
1999	982	+0.1%
2000	977	−0.5%
2001	998	+2.1%
2002	986	−1.2%
2003	966	−2.0%
2004	956	−1.0%
2005	941	−1.6%
2006	906	−3.7%
2007	898	−0.9%

Year	Pop.	±%
2008	910	+1.3%
2009	876	−3.7%
2010	876	+0.0%
2011	877	+0.1%
2012	893	+1.8%
2013	894	+0.1%
2014	923	+3.2%
2015	975	+5.6%
2016	1,000	+2.6%
2017	1,026	+2.6%
2018	993	−3.2%
2019	995	+0.2%

Sources: NWT Bureau of Statistics (2008–2019), NWT Bureau of Statistics (2001–2017)

Panethnic groups in the Hamlet of Tuktoyaktuk (2001–2021)
Panethnic group	2021		2016		2011		2006		2001	
Panethnic group	Pop.	%	Pop.	%	Pop.	%	Pop.	%	Pop.	%
Indigenous	850	92.39%	815	93.68%	760	92.12%	735	84.48%	875	94.09%
European (Note: Statistic includes all persons that did not make up part of a visible minority or an indigenous identity.)	55	5.98%	55	6.32%	65	7.88%	125	14.37%	55	5.91%
Latin American	10	1.09%	0	0%	0	0%	0	0%	0	0%
South Asian	0	0%	0	0%	0	0%	10	1.15%	0	0%
African	0	0%	0	0%	0	0%	10	1.15%	0	0%
East Asian (Note: Statistic includes total responses of "Chinese", "Korean", and "Japanese" under visible minority section on census.)	0	0%	0	0%	0	0%	0	0%	0	0%
Southeast Asian (Note: Statistic includes total responses of "Filipino" and "Southeast Asian" under visible minority section on census.)	0	0%	0	0%	0	0%	0	0%	0	0%
Middle Eastern (Note: Statistic includes total responses of "West Asian" and "Arab" under visible minority section on census.)	0	0%	0	0%	0	0%	0	0%	0	0%
Other / multiracial (Note: Statistic includes total responses of "Visible minority, n.i.e." and "Multiple visible minorities" under visible minority section on census.)	0	0%	0	0%	0	0%	0	0%	0	0%
Total responses	920	98.19%	870	96.88%	825	96.6%	870	100%	930	100%
Total population	937	100%	898	100%	854	100%	870	100%	930	100%
Note: Totals greater than 100% due to multiple origin responses

== Climate ==
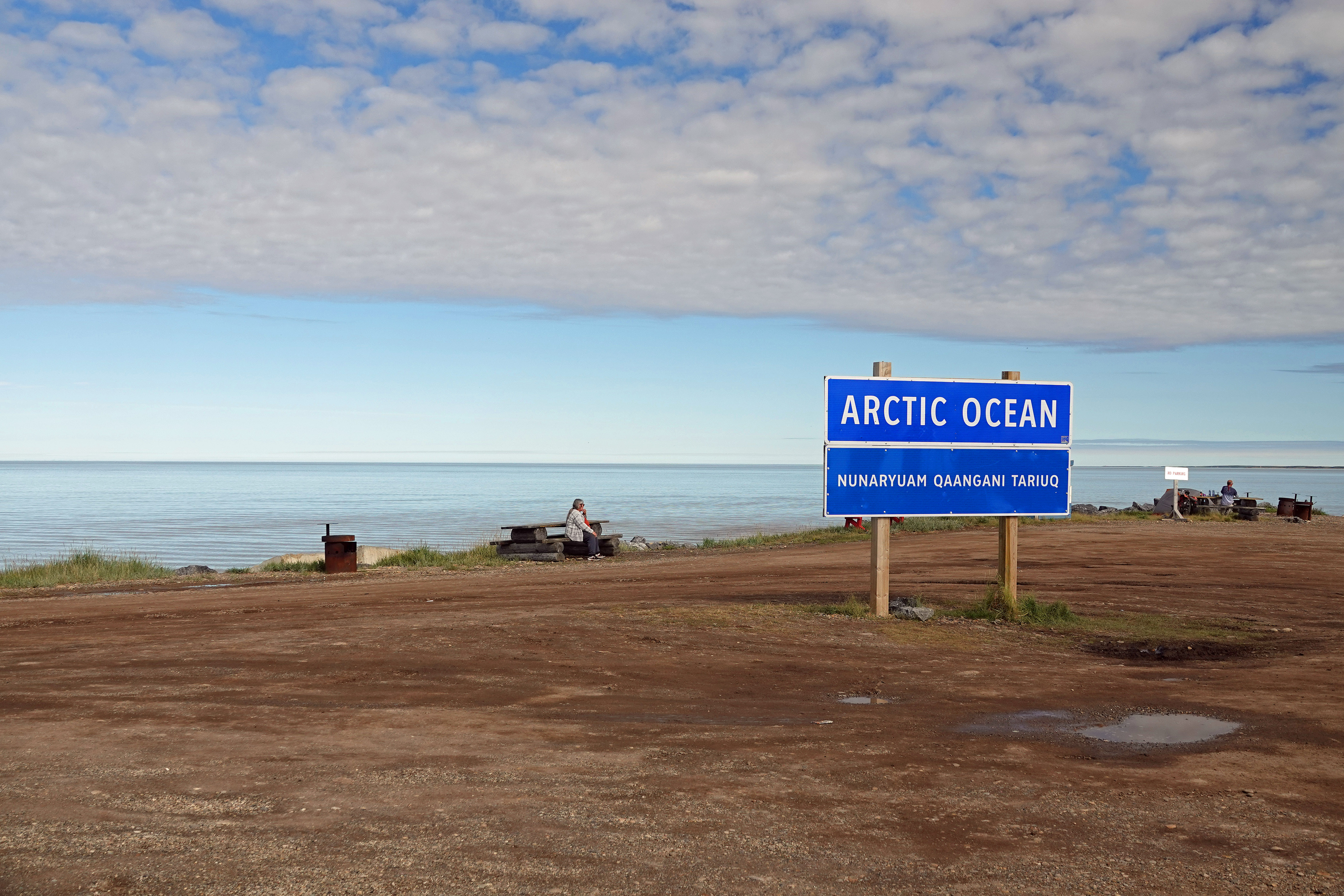
The Arctic Ocean, at the end of the Inuvik-Tuktoyaktuk Highway

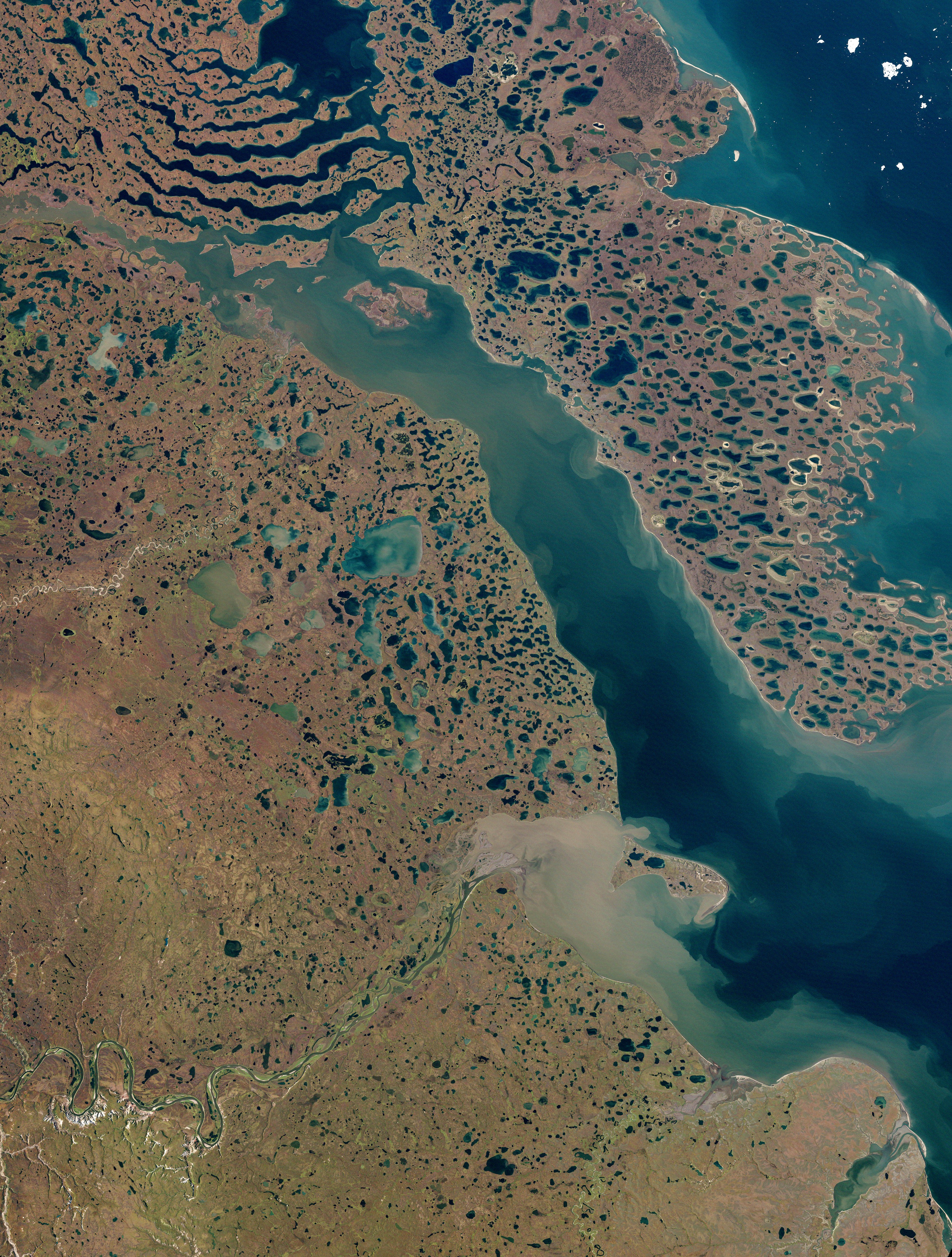
Satellite image of Liverpool Bay, the Husky Lakes, and the Tuktoyaktuk Peninsula

Tuktoyaktuk has a subarctic climate (Dfc), bordering on a tundra climate (ET), as the July mean temperature is barely above 10 °C (50 °F). Since the Arctic Ocean freezes over for much of the year, the maritime influence is minimized, resulting in cold winters and a strong seasonal lag in spring. This results in colder Aprils than Octobers and much colder Mays than Septembers. March is also colder than November.

Due to the dominance of cold air, Tuktoyaktuk has a lower precipitation rate than many desert climates. Still, the cold temperatures mean it receives more than a metre of snow a year on average. Owing to the thousands of kilometres of land south of Tuktoyaktuk, southerly winds can sometimes push warmer air into the region. Rex blocks can cause an exceptionally strong ridge of high pressure to form at higher latitudes, allowing heat to build consistently. As a result, temperatures well above average can occur in summer despite the cold surrounding waters.

During a bout of exceptionally hot Arctic weather, Tuktoyaktuk was among the numerous northern communities that witnessed extreme temperatures, reaching a high of 29.9 °C (85.8 °F) on 4 July 2022. Its overall highest temperature of 30.4 °C (86.7 °F) was recorded on 2 July 1998. Tuktoyaktuk's climate stands in stark contrast to those of Northern Norway at similar latitudes, but is in many ways less extreme than that of Eastern Canada at lower latitudes, where summers are cooler, moderated by the cool waters of the Hudson Bay.

Climate data for Tuktoyaktuk (Tuktoyaktuk/James Gruben Airport) WMO ID: 71985; coordinates 69°26′N 133°01′W; elevation: 4.6 m (15 ft); 1991–2020 normals, extremes 1948–present (Note: Includes composite data from Tuktoyaktuk A: Climate ID: 2203912 / 2203911; coordinates 69°26′00″N 133°01′35″W; elevation: 4.3 m (14 ft))
Month	Jan	Feb	Mar	Apr	May	Jun	Jul	Aug	Sep	Oct	Nov	Dec	Year
Record high humidex	3.8	0.7	3.0	7.0	23.9	32.3	34.2	32.9	22.4	17.2	2.4	0.6	34.2
Record high °C (°F)	4.0 (39.2)	0.7 (33.3)	3.2 (37.8)	8.3 (46.9)	25.2 (77.4)	29.4 (84.9)	30.4 (86.7)	29.9 (85.8)	21.1 (70.0)	17.9 (64.2)	2.5 (36.5)	0.8 (33.4)	30.4 (86.7)
Mean daily maximum °C (°F)	−22.0 (−7.6)	−22.1 (−7.8)	−19.6 (−3.3)	−9.8 (14.4)	1.3 (34.3)	11.6 (52.9)	15.5 (59.9)	12.5 (54.5)	6.3 (43.3)	−3.6 (25.5)	−13.7 (7.3)	−20.3 (−4.5)	−5.3 (22.5)
Daily mean °C (°F)	−25.8 (−14.4)	−26.0 (−14.8)	−24.0 (−11.2)	−14.6 (5.7)	−2.5 (27.5)	7.0 (44.6)	11.4 (52.5)	9.2 (48.6)	3.6 (38.5)	−6.3 (20.7)	−17.1 (1.2)	−23.8 (−10.8)	−9.1 (15.6)
Mean daily minimum °C (°F)	−29.5 (−21.1)	−29.8 (−21.6)	−28.4 (−19.1)	−19.3 (−2.7)	−6.3 (20.7)	2.4 (36.3)	7.3 (45.1)	5.9 (42.6)	0.9 (33.6)	−8.8 (16.2)	−20.5 (−4.9)	−27.2 (−17.0)	−12.8 (9.0)
Record low °C (°F)	−48.9 (−56.0)	−46.6 (−51.9)	−45.5 (−49.9)	−42.8 (−45.0)	−28.9 (−20.0)	−8.4 (16.9)	−1.7 (28.9)	−2.5 (27.5)	−12.8 (9.0)	−36.2 (−33.2)	−40.1 (−40.2)	−46.7 (−52.1)	−48.9 (−56.0)
Record low wind chill	−70.8	−61.2	−58.1	−55.5	−40.1	−16.5	−6.5	−8.9	−21.6	−43.5	−50.8	−58.9	−70.8
Average precipitation mm (inches)	10.5 (0.41)	8.9 (0.35)	7.2 (0.28)	8.3 (0.33)	6.8 (0.27)	11.0 (0.43)	22.3 (0.88)	25.7 (1.01)	23.3 (0.92)	18.4 (0.72)	9.6 (0.38)	8.7 (0.34)	160.7 (6.33)
Average rainfall mm (inches)	0.0 (0.0)	0.0 (0.0)	0.0 (0.0)	0.0 (0.0)	1.4 (0.06)	9.7 (0.38)	22.2 (0.87)	24.4 (0.96)	15.5 (0.61)	1.3 (0.05)	0.0 (0.0)	0.3 (0.01)	74.9 (2.95)
Average snowfall cm (inches)	13.4 (5.3)	10.2 (4.0)	9.0 (3.5)	9.4 (3.7)	6.2 (2.4)	1.3 (0.5)	0.1 (0.0)	1.2 (0.5)	8.9 (3.5)	20.1 (7.9)	12.1 (4.8)	11.2 (4.4)	103.1 (40.6)
Average precipitation days (≥ 0.2 mm)	8.4	7.3	7.1	5.5	4.9	5.1	10.1	12.7	12.7	13.3	9.6	8.9	105.6
Average rainy days (≥ 0.2 mm)	0.05	0.05	0.0	0.0	1.1	4.3	10.0	12.4	9.0	1.1	0.0	0.10	38.1
Average snowy days (≥ 0.2 cm)	8.6	7.4	7.5	5.8	4.2	1.0	0.14	0.90	5.0	13.0	9.9	9.1	72.5
Average relative humidity (%) (at 1500 LST)	78.4	78.4	75.7	77.5	77.2	69.3	69.7	75.4	79.0	86.7	85.0	80.6	76.7
Source: Environment and Climate Change Canada (rain / rain days, snow / snow days and precipitation / precipitation days 1981–2010)

== Transportation ==
Tuktoyaktuk/James Gruben Airport links Tuktoyaktuk to Inuvik. The Tuktoyaktuk Winter Road formerly provided road access to Inuvik in the winter. In 2017, the $300-million Inuvik–Tuktoyaktuk Highway opened. It provides all-season access to Inuvik, which connects to the rest of the highway networks in Canada.

The airport previously had scheduled service from Inuvik operated by Aklak Air. Service was cancelled in 2018 after the opening of the Inuvik–Tuktoyaktuk Highway created a permanent link between the communities and resulted in a drop in demand for air service.

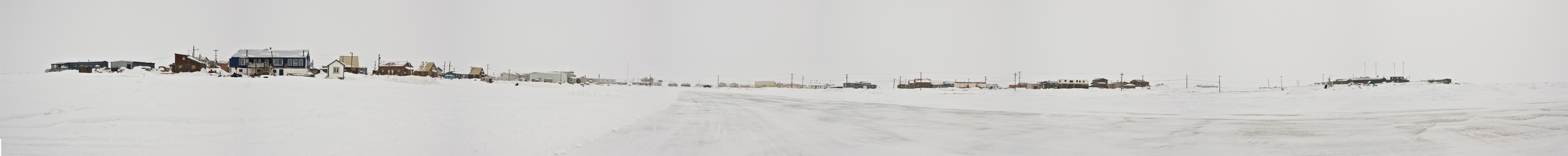
Tuktoyaktuk panorama

== Geopolitics ==
An unannounced visit by Polar Research Institute of China’s Xue Long to Tuktoyaktuk in 1999 has raised concerns for Canadian sovereignty and security in the Arctic region.

== In popular culture ==
- In the third episode of Jesse James Is a Dead Man, originally aired on 14 June 2009 on Spike TV, Jesse James rides his motorcycle from Inuvik to Tuktoyaktuk to drop off medical supplies.
- On 3 September 1995, the Molson Brewing Company arranged for several popular rock bands to perform in Tuktoyaktuk as a publicity stunt promoting its new ice-brewed beer. During the months leading up to concert, radio stations across North America ran contests in which they gave away free tickets. Dubbed The Molson Ice Polar Beach Party, it featured Hole, Metallica, Moist, Cake, and Veruca Salt. The show was attended by locals and 500 contest winners, who flew in from different parts of Canada. Canadian filmmaker Albert Nerenberg made a documentary about the concert, Invasion of the Beer People.
- Tuktoyaktuk is featured in the Discovery Channel TV show Ice Road Truckers.
- The imaginary Tuktoyaktuk University, abbreviated "TUK-U", has been "emblazoned on hundreds of thousands of T-shirts that travelled the world".

== See also ==
- List of municipalities in the Northwest Territories
- Territorial claims in the Arctic
