= Sahtu (disambiguation) =

Sahtu may refer to:

== in Canada ==
- Great Bear Lake (Sahtú in the Dene language)
- Sahtu, Dene people living in the vicinity of Great Bear Lake, Northwest Territories, Canada
- Sahtu language, spoken by the Sahtu
- Sahtu Dene Council, that represents the Sahtu people
- Sahtu Dene and Metis Comprehensive Land Claim Agreement, signed in September 1993, marking the resolution of the Sahtu Dene and Métis claims to the Sahtu area
- Sahtu Region, an administrative region in the NWT
- Sahtu (electoral district), an electoral region in the NWT

== elsewhere ==
- Sahtu, Iran, a village in Hormozgan Province, Iran
