= Sahtu =

Dene First Nations ethnic group

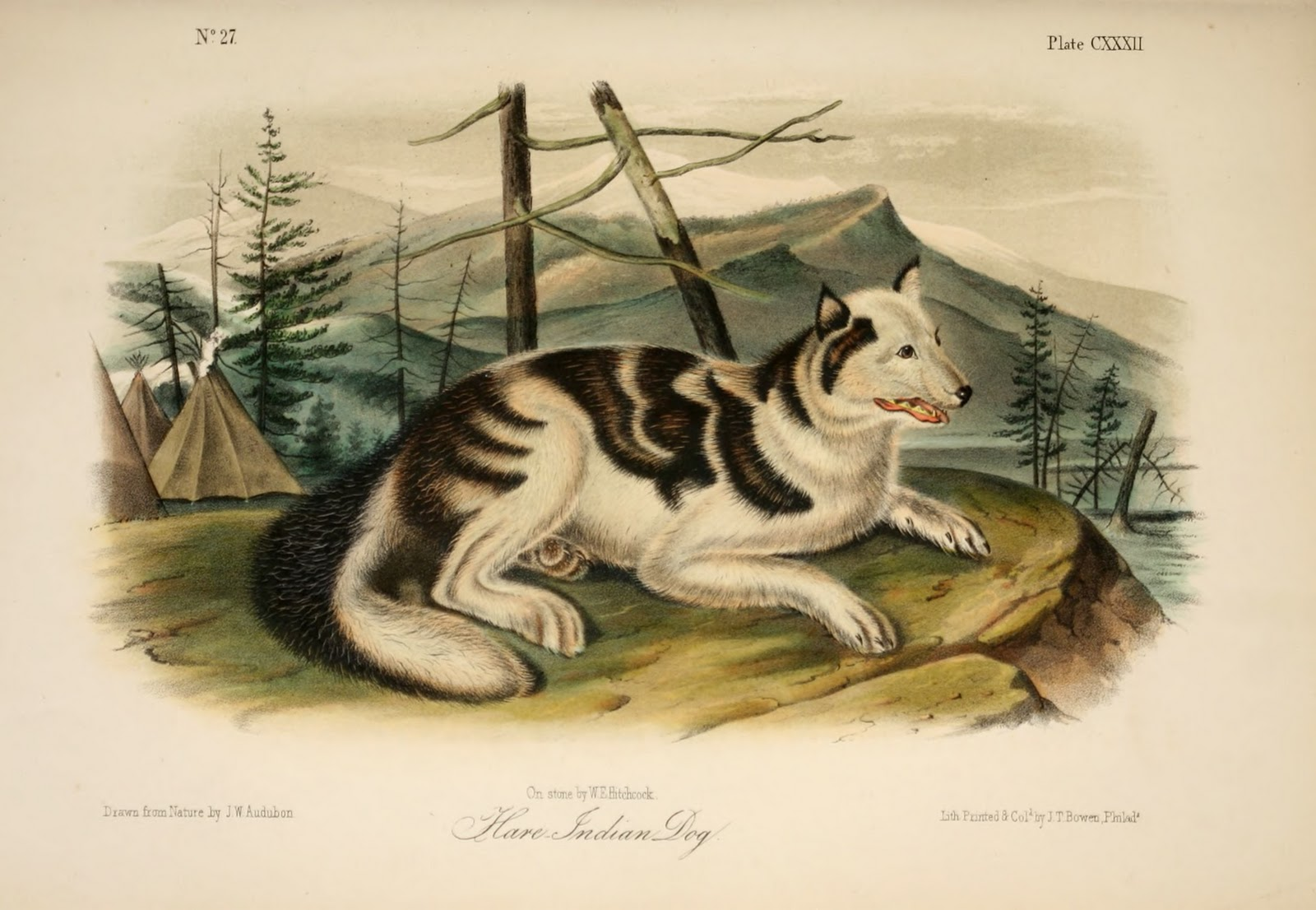
- Hare Indian Dog and Sahtu tipis, 1845–1848

Total population
- Canada; Northwest Territories
- 1,235 (2006)

Languages
- English, Sahtu (North Slavey)

Religion
- Christianity, Animism

Related ethnic groups
- South Slavey

Sahtu communities in the Northwest Territories

The Sahtú or North Slavey (historically called Hare or Hareskin Indians) are a Dene First Nations people of the Athabaskan-speaking ethnolinguistic group living in the vicinity of Great Bear Lake (Sahtú, the source of their name), Northwest Territories, Canada. The Sahtú peoples live in Colville Lake, Deline, Fort Good Hope, Norman Wells and Tulita which form the Sahtu Region of the NWT. The Dene of the region are represented by the Sahtu Dene Council who, in 1993, signed the Sahtu Dene and Metis Comprehensive Land Claim Agreement. Sahtú groups include the Hare Dene (K'ahsho Got'ine District, today: Colville Lake and Fort Good Hope), Bear Lake Dene (Déline District), and Mountain Dene (Tulit'a District). They call themselves also Ɂehdzo Got’ı̨ne (Trap People).

== Ethnography ==
An early description of Sahtú cultures is given in Alexander Mackenzie's journal of his voyage down the Mackenzie River to the Arctic Ocean in 1789.

Although there are close interrelationships among the Dene communities, they are culturally and linguistically distinct. The K’ahsho Got’ine (Hare(skin) Dene) are now centred in Fort Good Hope and Colville Lake. The Shita Got’ine (Mountain Dene) have joined with the K’áálǫ Got’ine (Willow Lake Dene) (they lived around K’áálô Tué – ″Willow Lake″, today known as Brackett Lake) in the community of Tulit’a. The Sahtúot’ine (Sahtú Dene or Great Bear Lake Dene) are named after Sahtú/Great Bear Lake, and are based in Deline. Métis people, descendants of relationships established between Dene people and fur traders, reside in all five communities of the region. The Hareskin Dene called themselves K'a so Got’ine/Katoo Got’ine ("big willow people") or K’ahsho Got’ine/K'áshot’ Got’ine (″big-arrowhead-people″, mistranslated as Hareskin people, an English rendering of Gahwié Got’ine – ″Rabbit(skin) People″).

The Déline community of the Sahtú Dene experienced great loss during Canada's participation in the Manhattan Project. The need for radioactive materials, (such as radium), to create atomic weapons was met with the deposits mined from the Eldorado Mine at Port Radium on Great Bear Lake. The Sahtú Dene were hired to transport the ore containing radium from the Northwest Territories to be processed in Ontario or the United States. Since much of the uranium that existed in Europe was under Nazi control, the radium deposits in Canada were vital to the creation of the first atomic bombs. Unaware of the radiation's effects, the Sahtú Dene used cloth sacks to transport the ore.

The number of deaths caused by radiation is disputed by the Government of Canada. The government report says that the people of Deline did not handle yellowcake but sulphur powder. The level of exposure to uranium ore without modern safety standards is expected to cause a small number of excess cancer deaths.

Ultimately, the devastating effects of radiation poisoning impacted the Déline community severely. A 1999 documentary by Peter Blow entitled Village of Widows detailed the experiences of the Sahtú Dene.

== Today's Sahtu Dene First Nations ==
Sahtu Dene Council

- Behdzi Ahda' First Nation (headquartered in Colville Lake (K'áhbamį́túé – ″ptarmigan net place″), ancestral homeland of the K'ahsho Got'ine (Hare(skin) Dene), the surrounding area is still inhabited by them, reserve: Colville Lake Settlement, Population: 219)
- Délı̨nę First Nation (Deline (Délınę) – ″Where the Water Flows", pronounced ′day-li-neh′, located near the headwaters of the Bear River (Sahtu De), where it rushes out of Great Bear Lake to the Mackenzie River, a place nearby where the lake seldom freezes over was a fishing place for the Sahtúot’ine/Sahtugotine (Bear Lake Dene), reserve: Fort Franklin Settlement, Population: 981, Sahtú Dene families are often related to K'ahsho Got'ine (Hare(skin Dene), Gwich’in and Shita Got'ine (Mountain Dene) peoples. The people of Great Bear Lake had to be hardy and resourceful to survive in the past. Within living memory, they lived a nomadic life, following fish and game with the seasons. Many still supplement their diets by hunting, fishing and trapping at least part of the time. Homes often feature a traditional lodge or tipi used to smoke meat and fish. In contrast, many of these same homes today are equipped with satellite dishes to pull in North American television.)
- Fort Good Hope First Nation (also known as K’asho Gotine Dene Band orK’asho Go’tine Community Council), headquartered in Fort Good Hope (or the Charter Community of K'asho Got'ine), called Rádeyîlîkóé – "Where the Rapids Are" by the local K'ahsho Got'ine (Hare(skin) Dene), is located on a peninsula between Jackfish Creek and the east bank of the Mackenzie River, about 145 km (90 mi) northwest of Norman Wells, reserve: Fort Good Hope Settlement, Population: 869)
- Tulita Dene First Nation (Tulita Band Council, also known as Begade Shotagotine First Nation, headquartered in Tulit'a – "Where the two Rivers Meet", which was formerly known as Fort Norman, reserve: Fort Norman Settlement, Population: 670) – they are as Begade Shotagotine (eng), Begaa Deh Shuh Tah Got’ie (North Slavey) or as Begaee Shuhagot'ine (South Slavey variety) also members of the Dehcho First Nations of the South Slavey

== Language ==
Sahtú speak the North Slavey language, which belongs to northwestern Canada group of Northern Athabaskan languages.

== Notable Sahtu people ==
- Ethel Blondin-Andrew, former Member of Parliament for the district of the Western Arctic
- Rosemary Georgeson, mixed Sahtu/Coast Salish multi-media artist
- Stephen Kakfwi, politician and was the ninth Premier of the Northwest Territories
- Cindy Kenny-Gilday, environmentalist and activist for Indigenous rights
- Rick Rivet (born 1949), Neo-expressionist painter
- James Wah-Shee, a former territorial level politician
- Edward Blondin, a shaman, helped developors find oil in Telltah, Canada

== See also ==
- Hare Indian Dog
- Saoyú-ʔehdacho, a National Historic Site of Canada with spiritual and historical significance to the Sahtu
