= Edward Blondin =

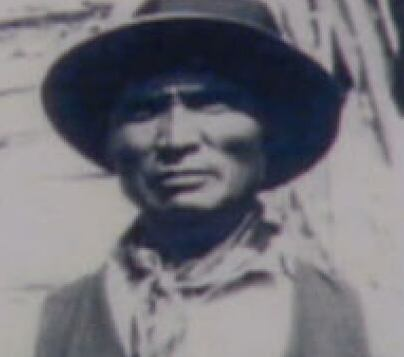
- Born: Délı̨nę
- Occupation(s): shaman, hunter, surveyor, lumberjack
- Spouse(s): Julia Blondin (died 1940); Eliza Blondin

Edward Blondin was a member of the Sahtu Dene First Nation, who played a prominent role in the industrial development of Canada's north. CBC News quotes one of his descendants describing how it was Blondin who first drew the attention of developers to the oil reserves at Tulita, on the Mackenzie River. This deposit was to play an important role in the building of the Alaska Highway. Blondin was one of the guides who found a route for the Canol pipeline that supplied the teams constructing the Alaska Highway with gas from Tulita.

Blondin also played a role in the development of the Eldorado Mine, at Port Radium.

In his 2006 book Trail of the Spirit: The Mysteries of Medicine Power Revealed, George Blondin, one of his descendants, wrote that Blondin acquired shaman skills from his own father.

In her 1996 book The Cultural Politics of Fur Julia Emberley quotes Blondin's son George's description of how his father found laws restricting trapping, passed in 1930s, affected the Dene following their traditional lifestyle.

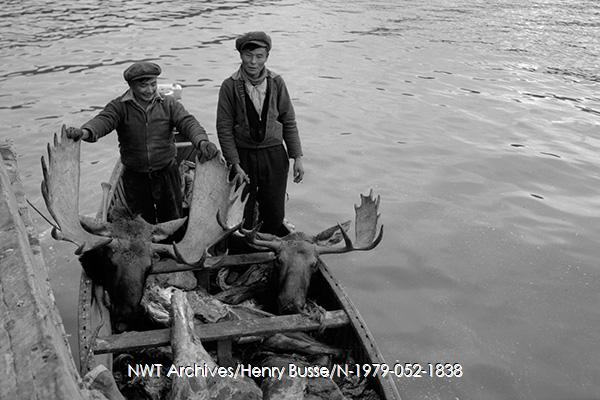
Edward Blondin and Jean Baptiste supply Port Radium with fresh meat.
