= Tulita =

Tulita Tulít’a
- Hamlet
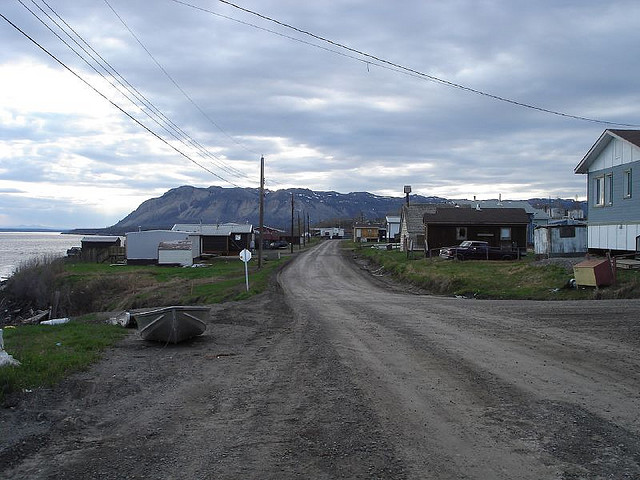

- Location within Northwest Territories Location within Canada
- Coordinates: 64°54′02″N 125°34′35″W
- Country: Canada
- Territory: Northwest Territories
- Region: Sahtu
- Settlement area: Sahtu
- Constituency: Sahtu
- Hamlet: 1 April 1984

Government
  - Mayor: Rocky Norwegian Sr.
  - Senior Administrative Officer: Bradley Menacho
  - MLA: Daniel McNeely

Area (2021)
  - Land: 52.28 km^{2} (20.19 sq mi)
- Elevation: 101 m (331 ft)

Population (2021)
  - Total: 396
  - Density: 7.6/km^{2} (20/sq mi)
- Time zone: UTC−06:00 (Northwest Territories Time)
- Canadian Postal code: X0E 0K0
- Area code: 867
- Telephone exchange: 588
- Living cost: 177.5^{A}
- Food price index: 165.8^{B}
- Sources: Department of Municipal and Community Affairs, Prince of Wales Northern Heritage Centre, Tulita profile at the Legislative Assembly; Canada Flight Supplement^A2013 figure based on Edmonton = 100^B2015 figure based on Yellowknife = 100

Tulita, which in Slavey means "where the rivers or waters meet", is a hamlet in the Sahtu Region of the Northwest Territories, Canada. It was formerly known as Fort Norman, until 1 January 1996. It is located at the junction of the Great Bear River and the Mackenzie River; the Bear originates at Great Bear Lake adjacent to Deline.

Tulita is in an area that is forested and well south of the tree line. Permafrost underlies the area, more or less continuous in distribution. Tulita is surrounded by mountains, the latter renowned for Dall sheep, and faces the Mackenzie Mountains to the west, which has mountain goats.

== History ==
Fort Norman originated as a Hudson's Bay Company trading post in the 19th century and has occupied a number of geographical locations prior to the settling of the modern community. A post by the name of Fort Norman occupied several locations, on the Mackenzie River, on the islands within it, on Bear River, and on the shore of Great Bear Lake near the present location of Deline. Who the name 'Norman' commemorates is unclear, but it may have been either Alexander Norman McLeod or Archibald Norman McLeod, both of whom were prominent in the northwest in the early 19th century.

Between 1863 and 1869, Fort Norman was located on Great Bear Lake, a short distance west of what later became Deline (Fort Franklin), and was an HBC post commanded by Nichol Taylor. Roman Catholic missionary Émile Petitot operated a small mission here during that period. In 1869, Nichol Taylor moved Fort Norman to its present position at the confluence of the Mackenzie and Bear Rivers.

Fort Norman rose to importance during the 1920s oil staking rush along the Mackenzie River, 50 km (31 mi) downstream of the community, where oil was developed and marketed at what became known as Norman Wells. It has also become a permanent settlement for predominately Sahtu Dene people on whose traditional land the original trading post was built. In 1996, the name of Fort Norman was officially changed to Tulita, which translates in Dene to "where the rivers or waters meet."

== Demographics ==
Federal census population history of Tulita
Year	Pop.	±%
1976	232	—
1981	286	+23.3%
1986	332	+16.1%
1991	375	+13.0%
1996	450	+20.0%
2001	473	+5.1%
2006	505	+6.8%
2011	478	−5.3%
2016	477	−0.2%
2021	396	−17.0%
Source: Statistics Canada

Annual population estimates

Year	Pop.	±%
1996	468	—
1997	477	+1.9%
1998	473	−0.8%
1999	490	+3.6%
2000	493	+0.6%
2001	495	+0.4%
2002	509	+2.8%
2003	504	−1.0%
2004	505	+0.2%
2005	526	+4.2%
2006	524	−0.4%

Year	Pop.	±%
2007	522	−0.4%
2008	521	−0.2%
2009	512	−1.7%
2010	519	+1.4%
2011	490	−5.6%
2012	496	+1.2%
2013	497	+0.2%
2014	502	+1.0%
2015	493	−1.8%
2016	515	+4.5%
2017	497	−3.5%

Sources: NWT Bureau of Statistics (2001–2017)

In the 2021 Canadian census conducted by Statistics Canada, Tulita had a population of 396 living in 134 of its 160 total private dwellings, a change of −17% from its 2016 population of 477. With a land area of 52.28 km^{2} (20.19 sq mi), it had a population density of 7.6/km^{2} (19.6/sq mi) in 2021.

In 2016, the majority of the population was Indigenous being First Nations and Métis. The main languages are North Slavey and English with some Dene.

== Transport and tourism ==
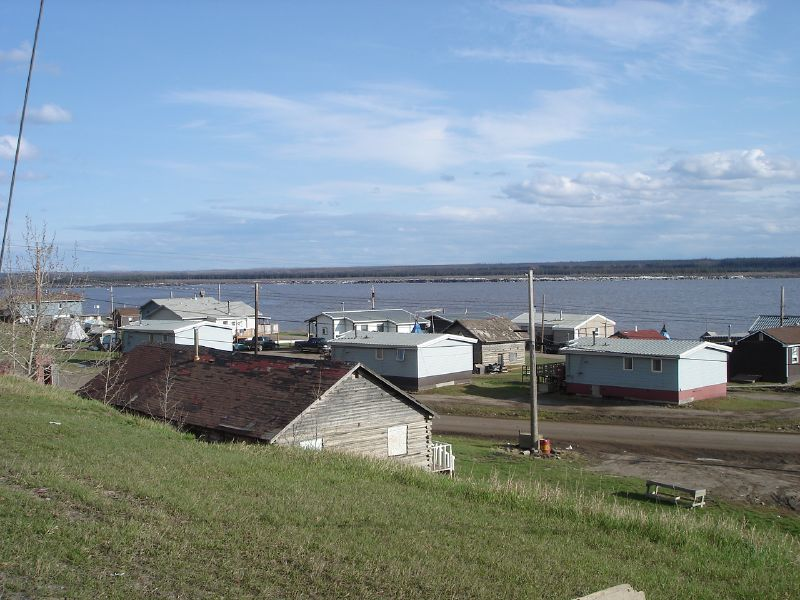
Tulita with the Mackenzie River

Tulita may be reached via air year-round, and is served by Tulita Airport; Norman Wells is the regional centre and the site of origin of the majority of flights in. A winter road links Tulita to Wrigley and thence the Mackenzie Highway, and is only open in mid- to late winter. Summer access is available by barge or by canoe, from Hay River along the Mackenzie River. The NWT government is seeking federal funding to extend the Mackenzie Highway from Wrigley through Tulita to Tsiigehtchic.

Amenities consist of a hotel, Northern Store, Royal Canadian Mounted Police detachment, and a nursing station. Chief Albert Wright School teaches grades K-12 while the hamlet has a library, arena, recreation hall, and fitness centre.

== First Nations ==
The Dene First Nations people of Tulita are represented by the Tulita Dene First Nation, a band government operating within the community. The TDFN is a member of the Sahtu Dene Council, joining the Behdzi Ahda' First Nation, Délı̨nę First Nation, and Fort Good Hope First Nation.

Treaty Indians from the community are party to the Sahtu Agreement, which gives them shared title to 41,437 square kilometers of land in the Sahtu Region. Under the Sahtu Agreement, self-government negotiations are ongoing in all five of the region's communities, but as of 2019 only Délı̨nę has successfully reached a Final Agreement.

== Notable people ==
- Actor Leslie Nielsen and politician Erik Nielsen lived there as children while their father was stationed with the Royal Canadian Mounted Police.

== Gallery ==
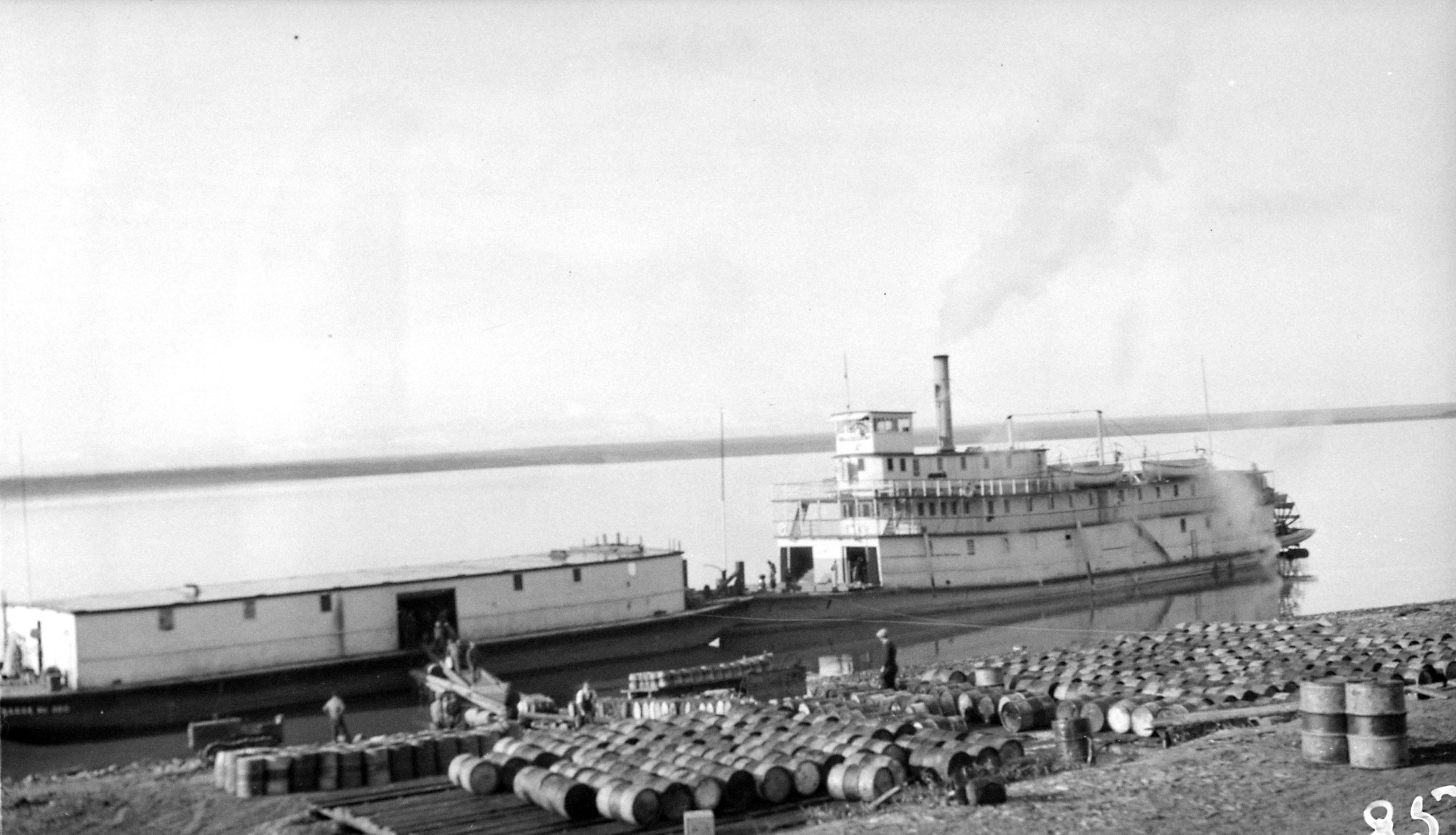
Sternwheeler Distributor and barge at Fort Norman, 1936

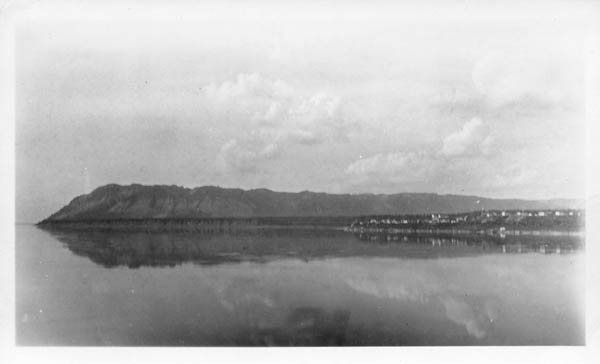
Fort Norman and Bear Rock

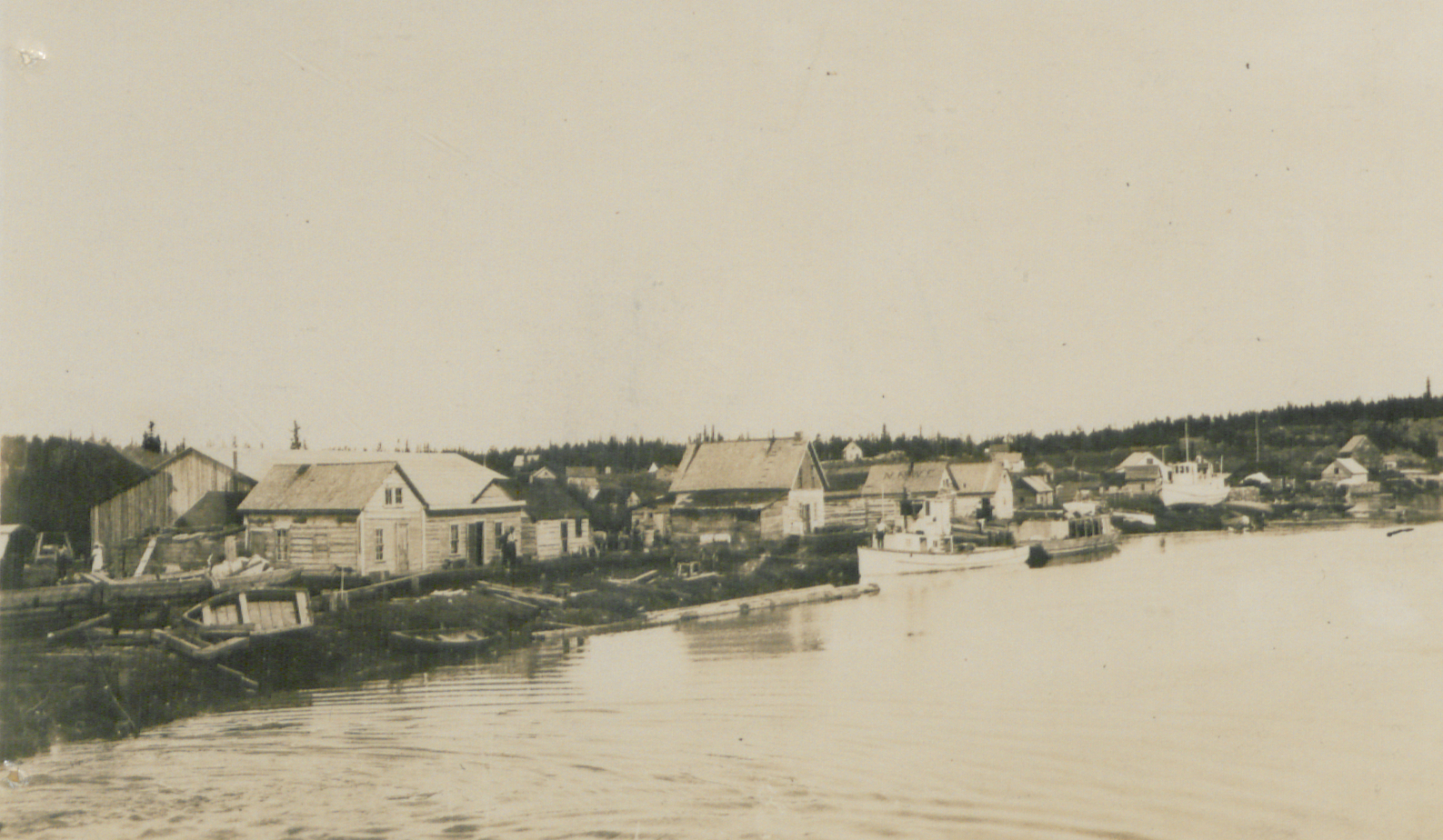
The Imperial Oil Company's expedition to the Fort Norman oil fields, 1921

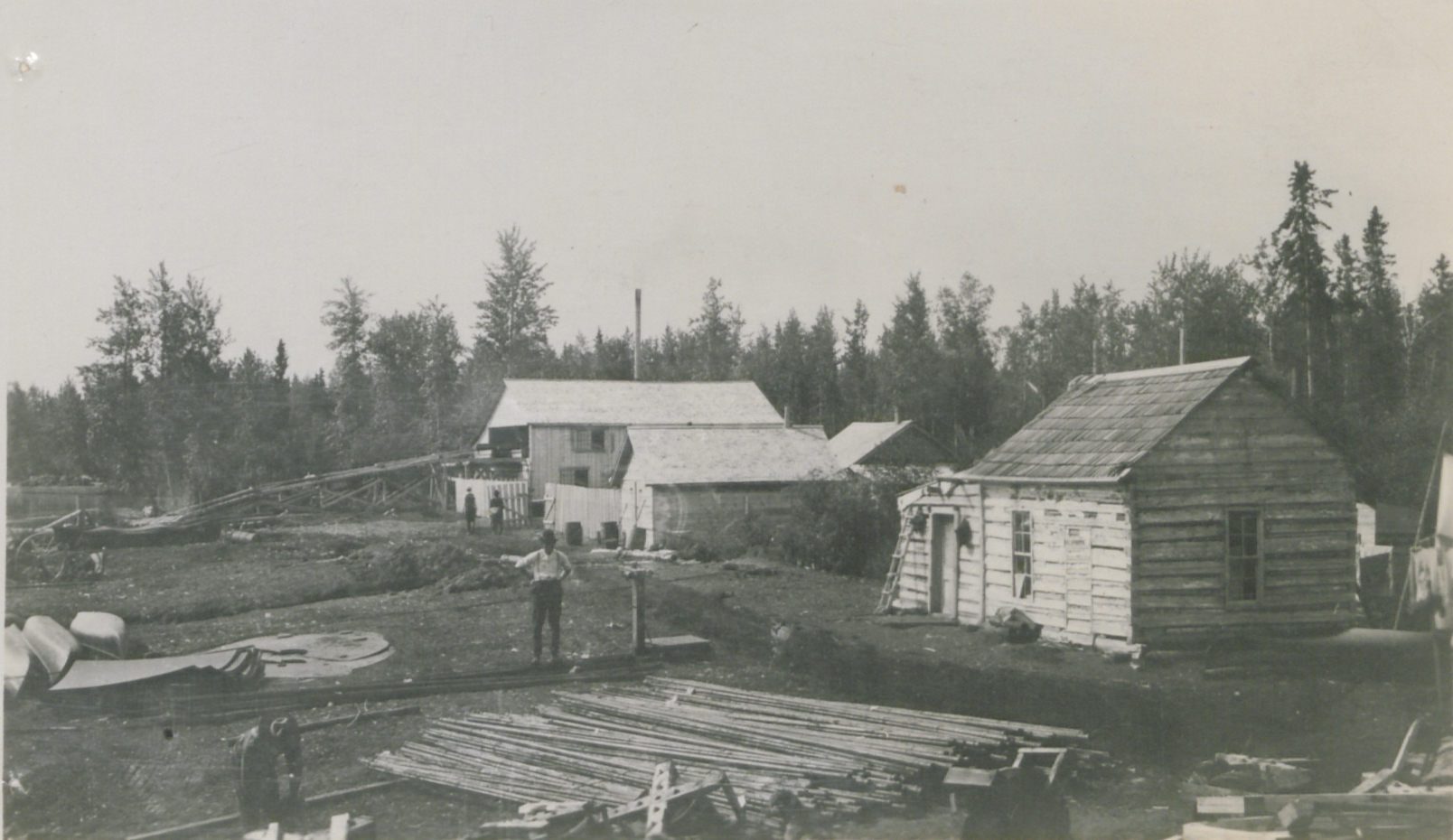
The Imperial Oil Company's expedition to the Fort Norman oil fields, 1921

== Climate ==
Tulita experiences a subarctic climate (Köppen: Dfc) with generally mild to warm summers and winters with averages below −20 °C (−4 °F). Peak snowfall occurs in the months of October and November, while rainfall is limited to the warmer months.

Climate data for Tulita Airport
Month	Jan	Feb	Mar	Apr	May	Jun	Jul	Aug	Sep	Oct	Nov	Dec	Year
Record high humidex	3.9	4.8	6.7	19.7	29.0	34.7	40.0	44.8	26.5	20.1	4.0	−1.2	44.8
Record high °C (°F)	5.6 (42.1)	8.3 (46.9)	15.0 (59.0)	20.6 (69.1)	31.7 (89.1)	34.4 (93.9)	36.9 (98.4)	34.6 (94.3)	28.5 (83.3)	22.8 (73.0)	8.3 (46.9)	3.0 (37.4)	36.9 (98.4)
Mean daily maximum °C (°F)	−21.7 (−7.1)	−19.1 (−2.4)	−11.5 (11.3)	0.7 (33.3)	12.4 (54.3)	20.9 (69.6)	22.7 (72.9)	19.2 (66.6)	10.3 (50.5)	−2.2 (28.0)	−14.5 (5.9)	−18.6 (−1.5)	−0.1 (31.8)
Daily mean °C (°F)	−25.2 (−13.4)	−23.4 (−10.1)	−17.3 (0.9)	−5.3 (22.5)	6.6 (43.9)	14.9 (58.8)	17.1 (62.8)	14.1 (57.4)	6.2 (43.2)	−5.0 (23.0)	−17.8 (0.0)	−22.3 (−8.1)	−4.8 (23.4)
Mean daily minimum °C (°F)	−28.7 (−19.7)	−27.6 (−17.7)	−23.0 (−9.4)	−11.3 (11.7)	0.7 (33.3)	8.9 (48.0)	11.5 (52.7)	9.0 (48.2)	2.1 (35.8)	−7.8 (18.0)	−20.7 (−5.3)	−25.9 (−14.6)	−9.4 (15.1)
Record low °C (°F)	−53.9 (−65.0)	−54.4 (−65.9)	−50.0 (−58.0)	−40.0 (−40.0)	−23.9 (−11.0)	−5.6 (21.9)	−3.3 (26.1)	−7.8 (18.0)	−15.6 (3.9)	−32.8 (−27.0)	−49.0 (−56.2)	−53.3 (−63.9)	−54.4 (−65.9)
Record low wind chill	−56.5	−57.1	−55.6	−36.3	−24.0	−5.9	0.0	0.0	−12.3	−35.4	−48.3	−55.2	−57.1
Average precipitation mm (inches)	14.8 (0.58)	11.5 (0.45)	8.7 (0.34)	9.1 (0.36)	13.4 (0.53)	36.0 (1.42)	44.2 (1.74)	46.9 (1.85)	38.9 (1.53)	32.8 (1.29)	21.8 (0.86)	15.0 (0.59)	293.0 (11.54)
Average rainfall mm (inches)	0.0 (0.0)	0.0 (0.0)	0.0 (0.0)	0.7 (0.03)	9.8 (0.39)	35.9 (1.41)	44.2 (1.74)	46.9 (1.85)	36.5 (1.44)	2.7 (0.11)	0.0 (0.0)	0.0 (0.0)	176.8 (6.96)
Average snowfall cm (inches)	14.8 (5.8)	11.5 (4.5)	8.7 (3.4)	8.5 (3.3)	3.7 (1.5)	0.1 (0.0)	0.0 (0.0)	0.0 (0.0)	2.4 (0.9)	30.1 (11.9)	22.2 (8.7)	15.0 (5.9)	116.7 (45.9)
Average precipitation days (≥ 0.2 mm)	7.1	5.7	5.8	3.9	4.7	7.6	9.1	9.1	8.6	9.4	8.9	8.3	88.1
Average rainy days (≥ 0.2 mm)	0.0	0.0	0.0	0.3	3.5	7.6	9.1	9.1	7.6	1.5	0.1	0.0	38.7
Average snowy days (≥ 0.2 cm)	7.1	5.7	5.8	3.7	1.2	0.1	0.0	0.0	0.9	8.1	8.9	8.3	49.7
Source: Environment Canada Canadian Climate Normals 1981–2010

== In literature ==
- The outpost of Fort Norman is featured in James A. Michener's 1989 novel Journey in which the character of Lord Luton seeks information there in the winter of 1897

== See also ==
- List of municipalities in the Northwest Territories
