= North Slavey =

North Slavey may mean,

- Sahtu, formerly the North Slavey people
- Slavey language, language spoken by the Sahtu
