= Fort Good Hope First Nation =

Fort Good Hope First Nation Band No. 752
- People: Dene
- Treaty: Treaty 11
- Headquarters: Fort Good Hope
- Territory: Northwest Territories

Population (2019)
- On other land: 593
- Off reserve: 329
- Total population: 922

Tribal Council
- Sahtu Dene Council

The Fort Good Hope First Nation is a Dene First Nations band government in the Northwest Territories. The band's main community is Fort Good Hope.

The Fort Good Hope First Nation is a member of the Sahtu Dene Council. Under the Sahtu Dene and Metis Comprehensive Land Claim Agreement, the First Nation shares title to 41,437 square kilometers of land in the Sahtu Region.
