= Norman Wells Proven Area Agreement =

1944 oil-related contract in Canada

The Norman Wells Proven Area Agreement, signed in 1944 by the federal government of Canada and Imperial Oil Limited, grants Imperial Oil the exclusive right and privilege to drill for, mine, win and extract all of the petroleum and natural gas from this field for three terms of 21 years. The Agreement was valid until the year 2008. Norman Wells is on the Mackenzie River in the Northwest Territories.

Under the Proven Area Agreement, Imperial Oil was designated the Operator of the project and given full control of the development and operation of the Proven Area and bears all the yearly up-front costs, charges and expenses incurred with the development and production of the proven area. The Government of Canada receives, as partner in the project, a one-third ownership interest in the gross production from this area.

== Regulatory Crisis ==
Since 2022, Imperial Oil has been operating the wells facilities at lower production speed, planning to replace the pipelines placed between local Bear and Goose Islands till 2025. The company considers crucial to continue the operations for the next decade or half, as any delay that goes in 2026, according to Imperial Oil, will result in the oil production cease in the next couple of years, causing the community, already suffering from a surge in cost of living, to find a new long-term power solutions. However Collin Pierrot, the chief of Fort Good Hope and a member of the K'ahsho Got'ine Committee calls this scare tactics employed by the company to continue their operations for longer.

Imperial Oil considered the environmental regulatory delays as the core challenge, which the Sahtu Secretariat said were necessary because of the environmental changes since the assessment conducted in 1980, and the increasing international attention given to indigenous rights, going further to argue the very need for the plant to continue its operations.

Later, Imperial Oil confirmed that Canada Energy Regulator has formally gave them the permission to keep operating the facility beyond its original expiry date of a key permit.

== See also ==
- Imperial Oil
