= Délı̨nę First Nation =

- Band No. 754
- People: Dene
- Treaty: Treaty 11; Sahtu Agreement; Délįnę Agreement
- Headquarters: Délı̨nę
- Territory: Northwest Territories

Population (2019)
- On other land: 901
- Off reserve: 156
- Total population: 1057

Government
- Chief: Raymond Tutcho
- Council: Daniel Bayha; Timothy Betsidea; Jane Modeste; Charles Neyele; Morris Neyelle; Freda Taneton; Raymond Taneton

Tribal Council
- Sahtu Dene Council

Website
- deline.ca

The Délı̨nę First Nation is a Dene First Nations band government in the Northwest Territories. The band's main community is Délı̨nę, the only populated place on Great Bear Lake. All of its powers and responsibilities were assumed by the Délı̨nę Got'ı̨nę Government in 2016, but the federal government still recognizes the band for Indian Act enrollment purposes.

The Délı̨nę First Nation is a member of the Sahtu Dene Council. Under the Sahtu Dene and Metis Comprehensive Land Claim Agreement, it shares title to 41,437 square kilometers of land in the Sahtu Region. In addition to this regional agreement, the band also ratified a Délı̨nę Final Self-Government Agreement in 2014. The resulting Délı̨nę Got'ı̨nę Government began operating on September 1, 2016, assuming all previous responsibilities of the Délı̨nę First Nation, Délı̨nę Land Corporation, and the Charter Community of Délı̨nę. This merger of a First Nation and a municipality is unique in the Northwest Territories.

With Parks Canada, the band jointly governs Saoyú-ʔehdacho, Canada's largest National Historic Site.
