= Tulita Dene First Nation =

Tulita Dene First Nation Band No. 750
- People: Dene
- Treaty: Treaty 11
- Headquarters: Tulita
- Territory: Northwest Territories

Population (2019)
- On other land: 386
- Off reserve: 331
- Total population: 717

Government
- Chief: Frank Andrew

Tribal Council
- Sahtu Dene Council

The Tulita Dene First Nation is a Dene First Nations band government in the Northwest Territories. The band's main community is Tulita, along the Mackenzie River.

The Tulita Dene First Nation is a member of the Sahtu Dene Council. Under the Sahtu Dene and Metis Comprehensive Land Claim Agreement, the First Nation shares title to 41,437 square kilometers of land in the Sahtu Region.
