= Cindy Kenny-Gilday =

Sahtu environmentalist and Indigenous rights activist (born 1954)

- Born: 1954 (age 71–72); Délı̨nę, Northwest Territories, Canada
- Education: University of Alberta
- Occupations: Environmentalist and activist for Indigenous rights
- Employer(s): International Union for Conservation of Nature; Diavik Diamond Mine
- Organization(s): Dene of Deline First Nations Uranium Committee; World Wildlife Fund Canada; Canadian Native Arts Foundation
- Children: 3

Cindy Kenny-Gilday OC (born 1954) is a Sahtu environmentalist and activist for Indigenous rights in Canada. She has campaigned about the contamination of land and people by uranium mining at Great Bear Lake during World War II and was Chair of the Dene of Deline First Nations Uranium Committee. She has also worked a special advisor to the Government of the Northwest Territories Department of Renewable Resources, has moderated United Nations (UN) conferences and chaired the International Union for Conservation of Nature's (IUCN) Taskforce for Indigenous People.

== Early life and education ==
Kenny-Gilday was born on an aeroplane that was transporting her mother to Norman Wells. She was raised in Délı̨nę, Northwest Territories, Canada. Her father Joe Kenny was a pitchblende ore (containing uranium) carrier from the shore of Great Bear Lake.

Kenny-Gilday studied a bachelors degree in Education at the University of Alberta and was one of the first Indigenous teachers in the Northwest Territories.

== Activism ==
Kenny-Gilday was the first Indigenous councilor of the IUCN and established and chaired the IUCN Taskforce for Indigenous People. In 1993, she moderated the UN Conference on Traditional Knowledge and Sustainable Development. She has also worked a special advisor to the Government of the Northwest Territories Department of Renewable Resources.

In 1997, Kenny-Gilday appeared in the environmental documentary film The Barrens Quest. She was also featured in the 2025 environmental documentary film Atomic Reaction.

In 1997, Kenny-Gilday was one of a group of Dene people who travelled to Japan to pay their respects to the survivors of the atomic bombings of Hiroshima and Nagasaki and participate in memorial activities. That year she also spoke at a plenary session of the National Round Table on the Environment and the Economy (NRTEE). With Robert Del Tredici she wrote to the Nikkei Voice in Toronto in 1997 and 1998.

From 1998, Kenny-Gilday was Chair of the Dene of Deline First Nations Uranium Committee, which advocated for Indigenous communities impacted by nuclear radiation. She has highlighted how Sahtu men that worked in the mining operations unknowingly irradiated themselves and developed lung, colon, and kidney cancers as they were not warned of the danger. Both Kenny-Gilday's father and brother died from cancer during the 1970s. She has said that:

"Deline is practically a village of widows, most of the men who worked as laborers have died of some form of cancer. The widows, who are traditional women were left to raise their families with no breadwinners, supporters. They were left to depend on welfare and other young men for their traditional food source. This village of young men are the first generation of men in the history of Dene on this lake to grow up without guidance from their grandfathers, fathers and uncles. This cultural, economic, spiritual, emotional deprivation impact on the community is a threat to the survival of the one and only tribe on Great Bear Lake."

Kenny-Gilday was a member of the Dene First Nation delegation who met with the Minister of Indian and Northern Affairs, Jane Stewart, and the Minister of Natural Resources, Ralph Goodale, in June 1998 in Ottawa to present a 106-page document titled They Never Told Us These Things which recorded the "deadly and continuing impacts of radium and uranium mining" and included a 14-point action plan. She published "A Village of Widows" in Peace, Justice and Freedom: Human Rights Challenges for the New Millennium (2000).

As of 2011, Kenny-Gilday worked as Aboriginal relations manager for Diavik Diamond Mine in Yellowknife. She is also a board member of the World Wildlife Fund Canada (WWF) and the Canadian Native Arts Foundation.

== Personal life ==
Gilday lives in Yellowknife with her husband and their three children.

== Awards ==
- Indspire Award (Environment, 1994)
- Queen Elizabeth II Diamond Jubilee Medal (2012)
- Officer of the Order of Canada.
