= Manitou Island =

Manitou Island may refer to:

- Manitou Island (Lake Superior), a small island off the eastern tip of the Michigan's Keweenaw Peninsula
- Manitou Island (Wisconsin), one of the Apostle Islands on Lake Superior
- The Manitou Islands, in Lake Michigan near the Michigan's Leelanau Peninsula consisting of
  - North Manitou Island
  - South Manitou Island
- Manitou Island (Mackenzie River), Northwest Territories across the Mackenzie River from Fort Good Hope

Manitou Islands may refer to:

- Manitou Islands (Lake Nipissing), a series of small islands in Lake Nipissing in Ontario, Canada

== See also ==
- Manitoulin Island
