= Délı̨nę =

Délı̨nę Délįnę
- Charter Community
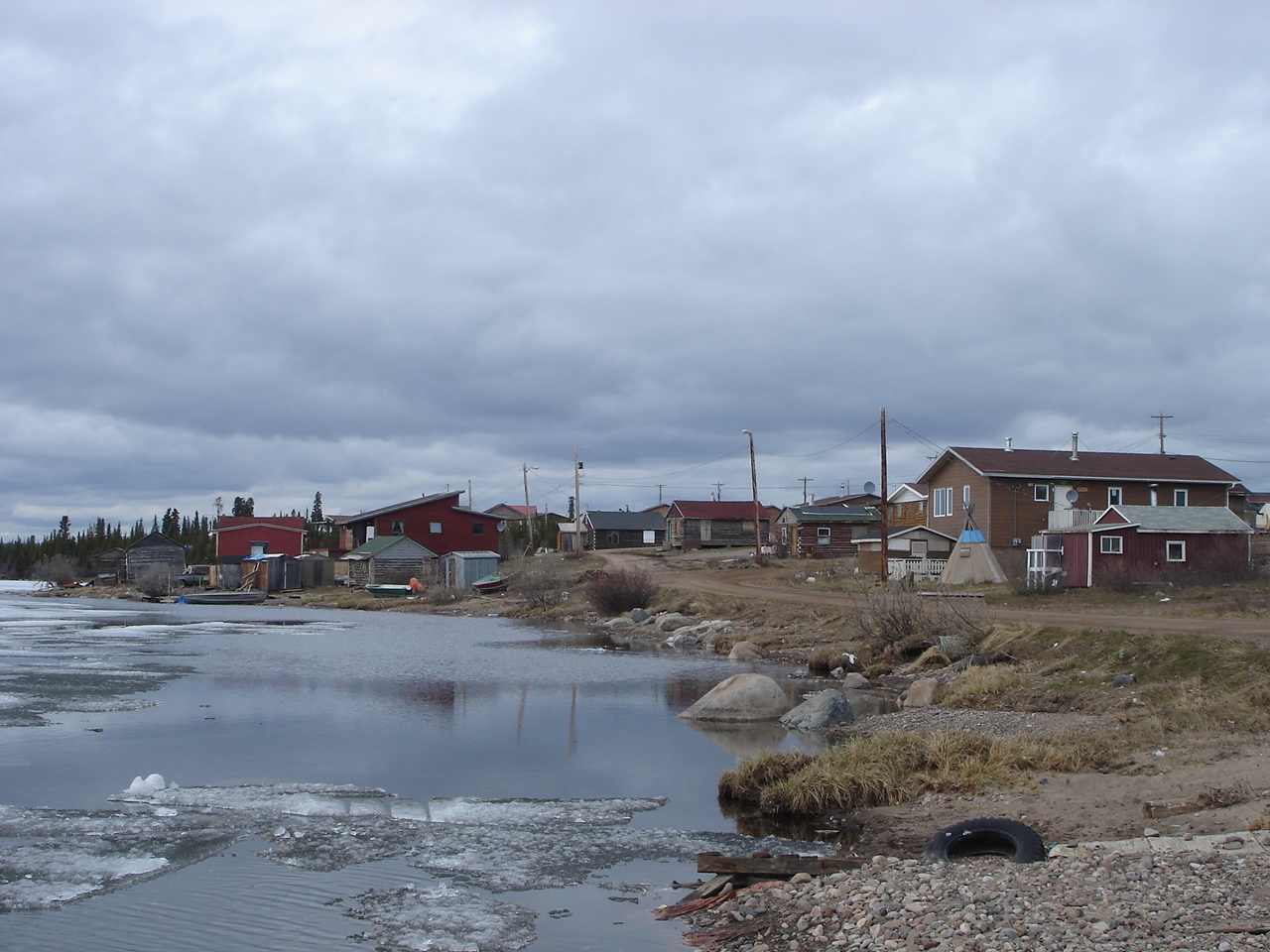

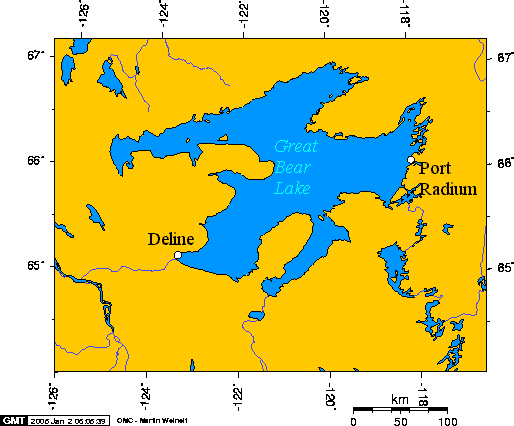
- Great Bear Lake, NWT, Canada

- Location of Délı̨nę Délı̨nę (Canada)
- Coordinates: 65°11′20″N 123°25′21″W
- Country: Canada
- Territory: Northwest Territories
- Region: Sahtu
- Settlement area: Sahtu Dene and Metis Comprehensive Land Claim Agreement
- Electoral district: Sahtu
- Charter Community: 1 April 1993

Government
  - Community Leader: Ekw'atide Danny Gaudet
  - Community Officer: David Little
  - MLA: Daniel McNeely

Area (2021)
  - Land: 79.39 km^{2} (30.65 sq mi)
- Elevation: 214 m (702 ft)

Population (2021)
  - Total: 573
  - Density: 7.2/km^{2} (19/sq mi)
- Time zone: UTC−06:00 (Northwest Territories Time)
- Postal code: X0E 0G0
- Area code: 867
- Telephone exchange: 589
- Living cost: 167.5^{A}
- Food price index: 164.5^{B}
- Website: www.deline.ca
- Sources: Department of Municipal and Community Affairs, Prince of Wales Northern Heritage Centre, Canada Flight Supplement^A2013 figure based on Edmonton = 100^B2015 figure based on Yellowknife = 100

The Charter Community of Délı̨nę (North Slavey: [tʼe˥lĩnɛ̃]) is located in the Sahtu Region of the Northwest Territories, Canada, on the western shore of Great Bear Lake and is 544 km (338 mi) northwest of Yellowknife. Délı̨nę means "where the waters flow", a reference to the headwaters of the Great Bear River, Sahtúdé. It is the only current settlement on the shores of Great Bear Lake, as Fort Confidence was last used in the 1800s and Port Radium closed in 1982.

There is no permanent road to the community and access is by Déline Airport, which is serviced by North-Wright Airways. In addition, Déline Water Aerodrome is available during the summer along with an ice road in the winter.

== History ==
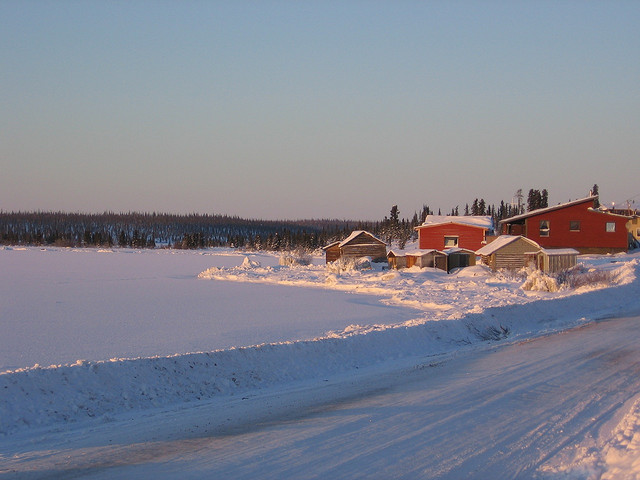
On the shores of Great Bear Lake

According to early records, a trading post was established in this general area as early as 1799 by the North West Company, but it did not last very many years. In 1825, Peter Warren Dease of the Hudson's Bay Company (HBC) erected an outpost here as the staging area and winter quarters for Sir John Franklin's second Arctic expedition of 1825–1827. It became known as Fort Franklin. Sir John Franklin's diary records that his men played ice sports very similar to what we now call hockey. As such, the modern-day town promotes itself as one of the birthplaces of the sport of ice hockey.

The HBC returned and established a post called Fort Norman a short distance west, and across the lake narrows, from John Franklin's original post, between 1863 and 1869, and then relocated Fort Norman to its current location at the confluence of the Mackenzie and Bear Rivers (now Tulita).

Fort Franklin as a modern-era trading post of the HBC was not established until later in the 19th century. It was constructed at one of the most productive Dene fisheries in the Mackenzie River drainage basin and was for the benefit of the Dene people who lived in near isolation along the shores of Great Bear Lake.

The area became prominent when pitchblende was discovered at the Eldorado Mine, some 250 km (160 mi) away, on the eastern shore, at Port Radium. During World War II, the Canadian Government took over the mine and began to produce uranium for the then-secret American nuclear bomb project. Uranium product was transported from Port Radium by barge across Great Bear Lake where a portage network was established along the Bear River, across the bay from Fort Franklin, where many of the Dene men found work. As the risks associated with radioactive materials were not well communicated, it is believed that many of the Dene were exposed to dangerous amounts of radiation, which Délı̨nę residents believe resulted in the development of cancer and led to premature deaths.

The name of Fort Franklin was changed on 1 June 1993 to Délı̨nę, which means "where the waters flow", a reference to the headwaters of the Great Bear River, Sahtúdé.

Nearby Saoyú-ʔehdacho, the largest National Historic Site of Canada, was designated in 1997 and is jointly administered by Parks Canada and the Délı̨nę First Nation.

On 5 March 2016, a tank truck fell partway through the ice road just a few days after the government had increased the allowed maximum weight limit to 40,000 kg (88,000 lb) on the road. The truck which was 3 km (1.9 mi) outside of Délı̨nę, and close to the community's fresh water intake as well as a major fishing area, contained approximately 30,000 L (6,600 imp gal; 7,900 US gal) of heating fuel and was one of 70 truck loads intended to resupply the community. The fuel was removed from the truck by 2 am, 8 March.

== Archaeology ==
John Franklin's 1825–1827 outpost was excavated by the Prince of Wales Northern Heritage Centre in 1987. The excavation uncovered beads, rings, and buttons indicating the extent of trade between the Dene and Europeans. The site is protected by the Northwest Territories Archaeological Sites Regulations. In 1996, the site was designated a National Historic Site of Canada.

== Land claims and self-government ==
Délı̨nę is represented by the Délı̨nę First Nation and belongs to the Sahtu Dene Council. Through the council, they completed negotiations with the Government of Canada for a comprehensive land claim settlement in 1993.

Pursuant to the 1993 Sahtu Dene and Metis Comprehensive Land Claim Agreement, Délı̨nę subsequently negotiated a self-government agreement with the Government of the Northwest Territories and the Government of Canada. The Final Self-Government Agreement was ratified by a majority vote of Délı̨nę's membership in March 2014. The Final Self-Government Agreement was signed by its leadership, by the Government of the Northwest Territories and by the Government of Canada in February 2015, enacted by the Legislative Assembly of the Northwest Territories in March 2015, and enacted by the Parliament of Canada in June 2015 through Bill C-63. On 1 September 2016, the Délı̨nę Got'ı̨nę Government entered existence, legally assuming all of the responsibilities formerly held by the Délı̨nę First Nation, the Délı̨nę Land Corporation, and the Charter Community of Délı̨nę.

The Final Self-Government Agreement is a Treaty within the meaning of ss. 25 and 35 of the Constitution Act, 1982. Through it, much of the Indian Act no longer applies to Délı̨nę's First Nations citizens. Merging a First Nations band government and a municipal government into a single authority, its structure is unique in the Northwest Territories.

== Demographics ==
Federal census population history of Déline
Year	Pop.	±%
1971	333	—
1976	422	+26.7%
1981	521	+23.5%
1986	532	+2.1%
1991	551	+3.6%
1996	616	+11.8%
2001	536	−13.0%
2006	525	−2.1%
2011	472	−10.1%
2016	533	+12.9%
2021	573	+7.5%
Source: Statistics Canada

Annual population estimates

Year	Pop.	±%
1996	645	—
1997	636	−1.4%
1998	615	−3.3%
1999	599	−2.6%
2000	568	−5.2%
2001	567	−0.2%
2002	551	−2.8%
2003	561	+1.8%
2004	553	−1.4%
2005	545	−1.4%
2006	548	+0.6%

Year	Pop.	±%
2007	533	−2.7%
2008	537	+0.8%
2009	519	−3.4%
2010	510	−1.7%
2011	491	−3.7%
2012	496	+1.0%
2013	476	−4.0%
2014	484	+1.7%
2015	498	+2.9%
2016	501	+0.6%
2017	510	+1.8%

Sources: NWT Bureau of Statistics (2001–2017)

In the 2021 Canadian census conducted by Statistics Canada, Déline had a population of 573 living in 190 of its 226 total private dwellings, a change of 7.5% from its 2016 population of 533. With a land area of 79.39 km^{2} (30.65 sq mi), it had a population density of 7.2/km^{2} (18.7/sq mi) in 2021.

In the 2021 Census, there were 525 Indigenous people, including 495 First Nations, Sahtu Dene people speaking North Slavey, 10 Métis and 10 Inuk (Inuit).

== Climate ==
Délı̨nę has a subarctic climate (Köppen climate classification: Dfc), with mild summers and severely cold winters. Precipitation is very low, but is somewhat higher in the summer than at other times of the year.

Climate data for Délı̨nę (Déline CS) WMO ID: 71503; coordinates 65°12′31″N 123°26′00″W; elevation: 212.8 m (698 ft); 1991–2020 normals. (Note: Composite data included from Déline Airport: Climate ID: 22010KA / 2201023; coordinates 65°12′40″N 123°26′11″W; elevation: 214.3 m (703 ft))
Month	Jan	Feb	Mar	Apr	May	Jun	Jul	Aug	Sep	Oct	Nov	Dec	Year
Record high humidex	11.1	5.0	14.3	16.2	24.4	30.8	33.3	32.6	25.4	20.1	3.8	4.0	33.3
Record high °C (°F)	4.0 (39.2)	5.1 (41.2)	14.7 (58.5)	16.3 (61.3)	24.8 (76.6)	30.2 (86.4)	31.4 (88.5)	32.0 (89.6)	24.0 (75.2)	20.8 (69.4)	4.8 (40.6)	5.6 (42.1)	32.0 (89.6)
Mean daily maximum °C (°F)	−20.6 (−5.1)	−17.9 (−0.2)	−12.8 (9.0)	−2.0 (28.4)	8.4 (47.1)	17.0 (62.6)	19.6 (67.3)	16.8 (62.2)	10.2 (50.4)	−0.3 (31.5)	−11.5 (11.3)	−18.2 (−0.8)	−0.9 (30.4)
Daily mean °C (°F)	−24.7 (−12.5)	−22.8 (−9.0)	−18.7 (−1.7)	−7.8 (18.0)	3.2 (37.8)	10.7 (51.3)	13.4 (56.1)	11.3 (52.3)	5.5 (41.9)	−3.4 (25.9)	−15.6 (3.9)	−22.3 (−8.1)	−5.9 (21.4)
Mean daily minimum °C (°F)	−28.8 (−19.8)	−27.6 (−17.7)	−24.5 (−12.1)	−13.8 (7.2)	−2.1 (28.2)	4.4 (39.9)	7.3 (45.1)	6.0 (42.8)	1.0 (33.8)	−6.5 (20.3)	−19.6 (−3.3)	−26.3 (−15.3)	−10.9 (12.4)
Record low °C (°F)	−49.1 (−56.4)	−45.9 (−50.6)	−44.1 (−47.4)	−35.0 (−31.0)	−23.3 (−9.9)	−6.9 (19.6)	−1.8 (28.8)	−4.9 (23.2)	−13.3 (8.1)	−29.7 (−21.5)	−37.4 (−35.3)	−43.6 (−46.5)	−49.1 (−56.4)
Record low wind chill	−55.9	−53.7	−53.7	−41.7	−30.9	−8.6	−3.2	−8.3	−15.8	−30.8	−44.0	−52.4	−55.9
Average precipitation mm (inches)	11.8 (0.46)	11.7 (0.46)	9.5 (0.37)	11.0 (0.43)	14.7 (0.58)	23.7 (0.93)	40.2 (1.58)	42.9 (1.69)	38.6 (1.52)	31.7 (1.25)	21.6 (0.85)	11.9 (0.47)	269.2 (10.60)
Average rainfall mm (inches)	0.0 (0.0)	0.0 (0.0)	0.0 (0.0)	0.2 (0.01)	12.7 (0.50)	23.5 (0.93)	39.9 (1.57)	—	38.5 (1.52)	—	0.3 (0.01)	0.0 (0.0)	—
Average snowfall cm (inches)	13.4 (5.3)	16.2 (6.4)	15.1 (5.9)	12.1 (4.8)	3.0 (1.2)	0.3 (0.1)	0.0 (0.0)	0.0 (0.0)	2.1 (0.8)	—	34.5 (13.6)	17.6 (6.9)	—
Average precipitation days (≥ 0.2 mm)	6.1	8.0	7.6	5.2	6.5	8.5	10.7	12.2	12.3	12.9	10.2	7.8	108.1
Average rainy days (≥ 0.2 mm)	0.0	0.0	0.0	0.3	4.9	8.1	10.5	—	12.0	—	0.1	0.0	—
Average snowy days (≥ 0.2 cm)	7.0	8.5	9.0	4.7	1.6	0.2	0.0	0.0	0.9	—	11.5	9.3	—
Average relative humidity (%) (at 1500 LST)	76.7	70.9	59.9	56.8	55.5	52.5	55.8	62.5	65.7	81.1	83.7	80.5	66.8
Source: Environment and Climate Change Canada

== Gallery ==
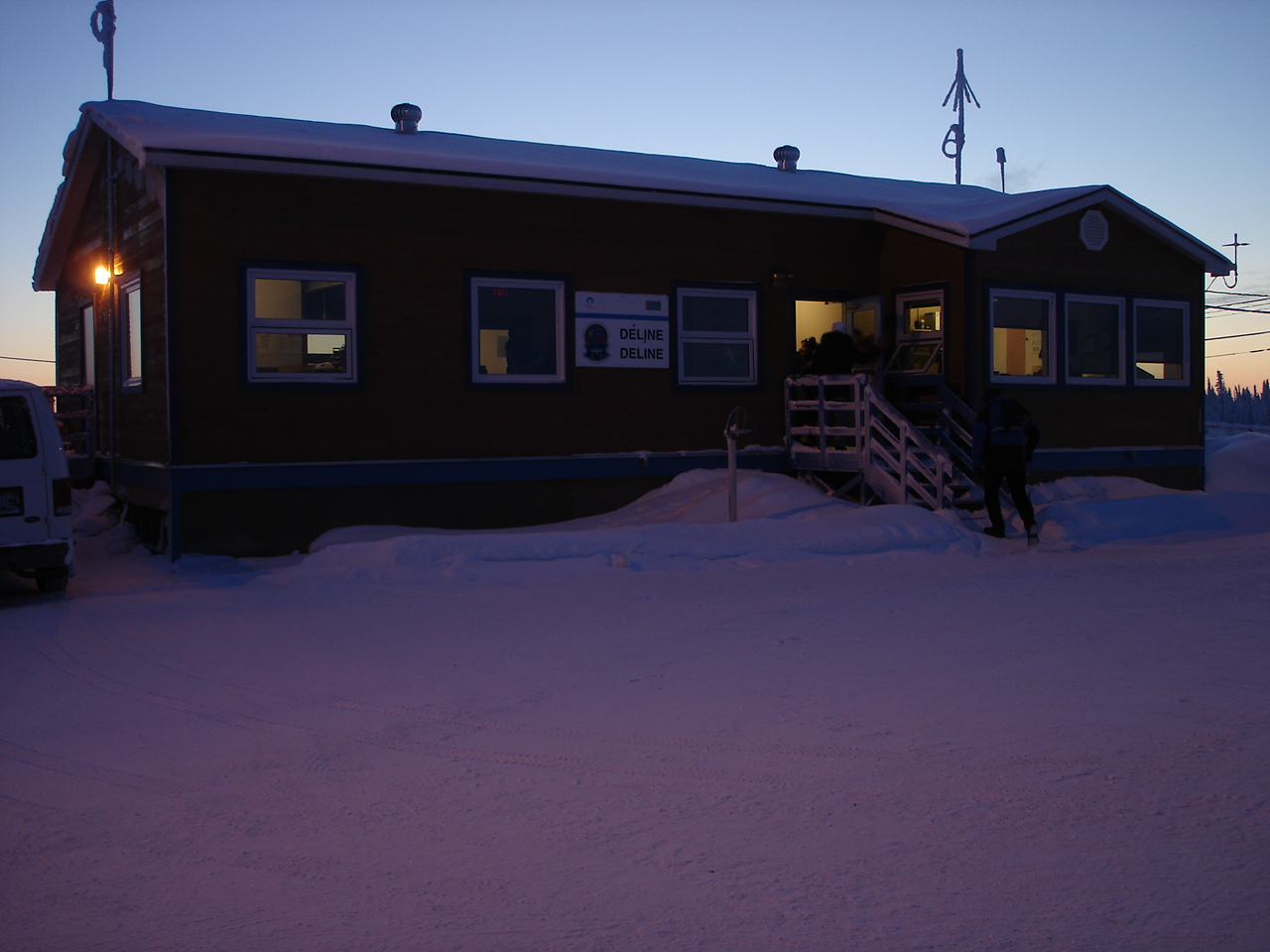
Déline Airport

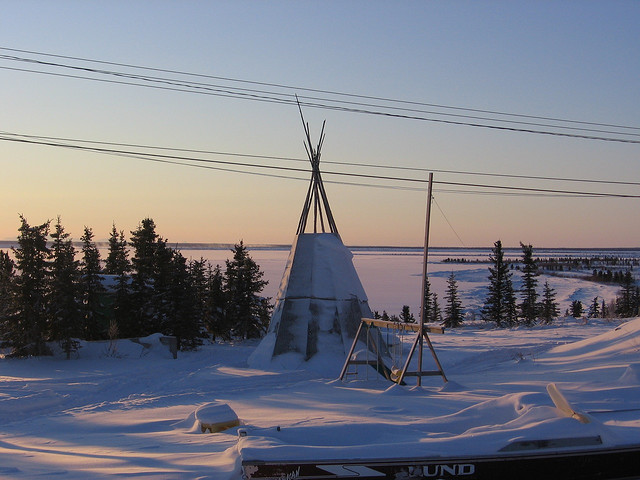
Tipi

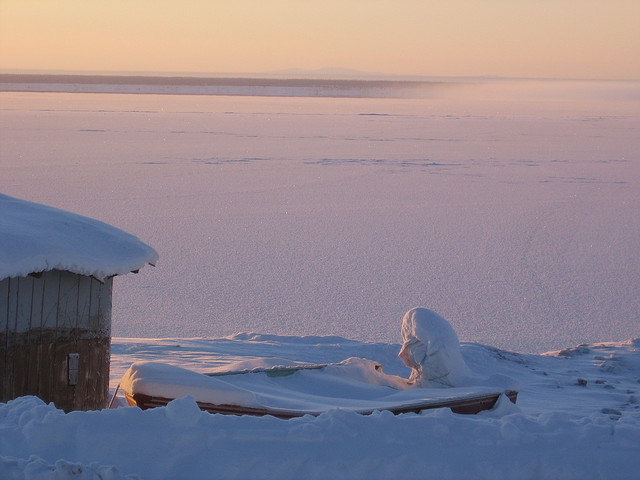
Deline

== See also ==
- List of municipalities in the Northwest Territories
