= Sahtu Dene Council =

The Sahtu Dene Council is a council that represents the Sahtu people of the Northwest Territories, Canada. The council signed a comprehensive land claim agreement in 1993 with the Government of Canada, the Sahtu Dene and Metis Comprehensive Land Claim Agreement, for the seven Dene and Métis communities in the Sahtu Region. It is the first such agreement to include three Métis members (Tulita, Fort Good Hope and Norman Wells) in the Northwest Territories. The Sahtu Secretariat Incorporated and various designated organizations implement the agreement and pursue ongoing negotiations. The Sahtu Dene Council represents the four Indian Band councils.

== Members ==
- Behdzi Ahda' First Nation (Ayoni Keh Land Corporation) - Colville Lake
- Délı̨nę First Nation (Deline Got'ine Government) - Délı̨nę
- Fort Good Hope First Nation (K’ahsho Got'ine Community Council, Yamoga Land Corporation) - Fort Good Hope
- Tulita Dene First Nation (Begade Shotagotine, Tulita Land & Financial Corporation) - Tulita
