= Behdzi Ahda' First Nation =

Behdzi Ahda' First Nation Band No. 771
- People: Dene
- Treaty: Treaty 11
- Headquarters: Colville Lake
- Territory: Northwest Territories

Population (2019)
- On other land: 215
- Off reserve: 47
- Total population: 262

Government
- Chief: Wilbert Kochon

Tribal Council
- Sahtu Dene Council

The Behdzi Ahda' First Nation is a Dene First Nations band government in the Northwest Territories. The band's main community is Colville Lake.

The Behdzi Ahda' First Nation is a member of the Sahtu Dene Council. Under the Sahtu Dene and Metis Comprehensive Land Claim Agreement, the First Nation shares title to 41,437 square kilometers of land in the Sahtu Region.
