= Saoyú-ʔehdacho =

- Location within Northwest Territories
- 65.333508°N 121.001639°W
- Location: Northwest Territories, Canada

Site notes
- Governing body: Parks Canada, Déline First Nation

National Historic Site of Canada
- Official name: Saoyú-ʔehdacho National Historic Site
- Designated: 1997

Saoyú-ʔehdacho (also known as Sahoyue-Edacho, Sahoyúé-§ehdacho, Saoyú and Æehdacho and Grizzly Bear Mountain and Scented Grass Hills) is a cultural landscape in the Northwest Territories, Canada, comprising two peninsulas in Great Bear Lake. The site has great cultural and spiritual significance for the Sahtu people, as it is considered sacred land and it features prominently in their oral histories.

== Natural and cultural heritage ==
Saoyú-ʔehdacho is 5,587 square kilometres (2,157 sq mi) in size, approximately the size of the province of Prince Edward Island, and consists of two peninsulas: Saoyú (Grizzly Bear Mountain) and ʔehdacho (Scented Grass Hills). The peninsulas are both characterized by flat summits, approximately 725 and 650 metres (2,379 and 2,133 ft) above sea level respectively. The perimeters of both promontories feature a series of raised beaches, formed by the post-glacial rebound, which contain the majority of the known evidence of human occupation of the lands, including archaeological resources related to pre-contact occupation from over 5000 years ago.

== National Historic Site ==
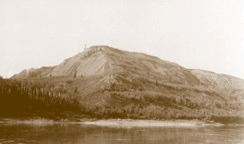
Grizzly Bear Mountain in the 1920s

Saoyú-ʔehdacho was designated a National Historic Site in 1997, on the basis that the landscape, its cultural resources (including graves, trails and cabins) and its associated oral histories contribute to an understanding of the origin, spiritual values, lifestyle and land-use of the Sahtu Dene. In 2001 and 2005, the federal government enacted withdrawal orders under the Territorial Lands Act, prohibiting the registration of new mineral claims or other third party interests against the Saoyú-ʔehdacho lands. In 2007, Parks Canada entered into an agreement with the Déline First Nation to permanently protect and cooperatively manage the site, with surface title to the Crown lands portion of the site (constituting 80% of the overall land) transferred to Parks Canada from Aboriginal Affairs and Northern Development Canada in 2009. In 2011, an Order in Council increased the legal protection for Crown-owned portions of the site by applying regulatory protections under the National Parks Act to the lands.

Saoyú-ʔehdacho is the largest National Historic Site of Canada in land area. Saoyú-ʔehdacho is also:

- the first National Historic Site both designated and acquired on the basis of consultation with Aboriginal peoples;
- the first National Historic Site in Northern Canada cooperatively managed by Parks Canada and an aboriginal group;
- the first National Historic Site in the Northwest Territories in which Parks Canada is involved in the administration; and
- the first cultural landscape in Northern Canada commemorated by the Government of Canada.

Saoyú-ʔehdacho is also the first site to be protected under the territorial government's Protected Areas Strategy, a consultative process created with the involvement of the federal and territorial governments, aboriginal groups, environmental groups and industry, with the objective of establishing a network of protected areas across the Northwest Territories.

== Name ==
In the Slavey language, "Saoyú" means "belonging to the bear" and "ʔehdacho" means "big point".

When the site was first designated a National Historic Site in 1997, it was named Scented Grass Hills and Grizzly Bear Mountain. It was subsequently renamed Sahoyúé-§ehdacho, and again renamed to Saoyú-Æehdacho in June 2008 in an attempt to better reflect the Slavey name for the site. In June 2010, the cooperative management board for the site, made up of representatives of Parks Canada, the Déline Renewable Resources Council and the Déline Land Corporation, adopted the spelling Saoyú-ʔehdacho. The Status of Designation Committee of the national Historic Sites and Monuments Board approved the official name change for the National Historic Site in October 2010.
