= Manitou Island (Mackenzie River) =

Island in the Northwest Territories, Canada

- Interactive map of Manitou Island

Geography
- Location: Mackenzie River
- Coordinates: 66.275°N 128.680°W

Administration
- Canada

Manitou Island is an uninhabited island on the Mackenzie River and across from Fort Good Hope, Canada.

The island briefly hosted Fort Good Hope as fur trading post beginning in 1826 and ended after flood damaged outpost in 1836. The island was a source of firewood and small game.
