= Sahtu, Iran =

Sahtu سهتو
- Village
- Country: Iran
- Province: Hormozgan
- County: Jask
- Bakhsh: Lirdaf
- Rural District: Surak

Population (2006)
  - Total: 98
- Time zone: UTC+3:30 (IRST)
  - Summer (DST): UTC+4:30 (IRDT)

Sahtu (Persian: سهتو, also Romanized as Sahtū) is a village in Surak Rural District, Lirdaf District, Jask County, Hormozgan Province, Iran. At the 2006 census, its population was 98, in 22 families.
