= Fort Good Hope =

Fort Good Hope Rádeyı̨lı̨kóé Fort Hope, Fort Charles
- Charter Community
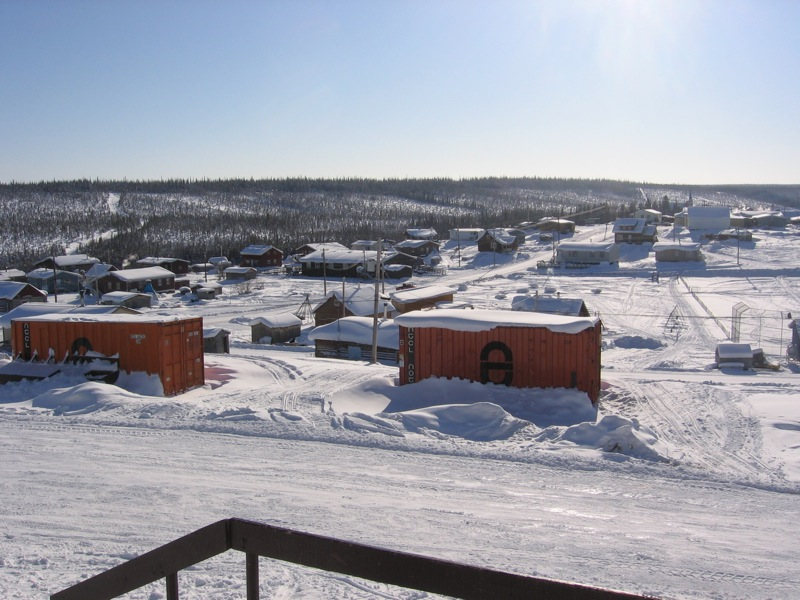

- Location within Northwest Territories Location within Canada
- Coordinates: 66°15′25″N 128°38′16″W
- Country: Canada
- Territory: Northwest Territories
- Region: Sahtu
- Settlement area: Sahtu
- Constituency: Sahtu
- Charter Community: 1 April 1995

Government
  - Chief: Collin Pierrot
  - Senior Administrative Officer: Irvin Eng
  - MLA: Daniel McNeely

Area
  - Land: 47.25 km^{2} (18.24 sq mi)
- Elevation: 268 m (879 ft)

Population (2021)
  - Total: 507
  - Density: 10.7/km^{2} (28/sq mi)
- Time zone: UTC−06:00 (Northwest Territories Time)
- Canadian Postal code: X0E 0H0
- Area code: 867
- Telephone exchange: 598
- Living cost: 177.5^{A}
- Food price index: 166.9^{B}
- Sources: Department of Municipal and Community Affairs, Prince of Wales Northern Heritage Centre, Canada Flight Supplement^A2013 figure based on Edmonton = 100^B2015 figure based on Yellowknife = 100

Fort Good Hope (formerly Fort Hope, Fort Charles, also now known as the Charter Community of K'asho Got'ine "KAH-sho go-TIN-eh") is a charter community in the Sahtu Region of the Northwest Territories, Canada. It is located on a peninsula between Jackfish Creek and the east bank of the Mackenzie River, about 145 km (90 mi) northwest of Norman Wells.

Its population is about 500, mainly indigenous. The two principal languages are North Slavey and English. Hunting and trapping are two major sources of income.

The Church of Our Lady of Good Hope, a National Historic Site, is located in the community. The church, completed in 1885, was once home to Father Émile Petitot.

== History ==
The settlement was established as a North West Company fur trading outpost in 1804 (or 1805). It was known mainly as Fort Good Hope, but also as Fort Hope and Fort Charles (not the same as the HBC fort from 1686) The outpost was relocated several times from the current site; between 1804 and before 1823 somewhere between Arctic Red River and Peel River (by NWC and HBC) near Tsiigehtchic, 1823 on the west banks of the Mackenzie near what was called Thunder River near where the rivers runs east–west direction north of current site (labelled in A.K. Isbester 1845 map as Old Fort Good Hope), remained there until 1826 relocated on Manitou Island. Flooding forced HBC to relocate their outpost twice on the east banks in 1836.

The fur outpost ended in 1918 and became a HBC retail operation that is now known as Northern Stores.

== Demographics ==
Federal census population history of Fort Good Hope
Year	Pop.	±%
1976	443	—
1981	463	+4.5%
1986	562	+21.4%
1991	602	+7.1%
1996	644	+7.0%
2001	549	−14.8%
2006	557	+1.5%
2011	515	−7.5%
2016	516	+0.2%
2021	507	−1.7%
Source: Statistics Canada

Annual population estimates

Year	Pop.	±%
1996	699	—
1997	687	−1.7%
1998	674	−1.9%
1999	642	−4.7%
2000	607	−5.5%
2001	588	−3.1%
2002	600	+2.0%
2003	564	−6.0%
2004	555	−1.6%
2005	559	+0.7%
2006	577	+3.2%
2007	566	−1.9%
2008	557	−1.6%
2009	560	+0.5%

Year	Pop.	±%
2010	548	−2.1%
2011	523	−4.6%
2012	535	+2.3%
2013	538	+0.6%
2014	557	+3.5%
2015	580	+4.1%
2016	561	−3.3%
2017	570	+1.6%
2018	570	+0.0%
2019	554	−2.8%
2020	561	+1.3%
2021	555	−1.1%
2022	568	+2.3%
2023	591	+4.0%

Sources: NWT Bureau of Statistics (2001 - 2023)

In the 2021 Census of Population conducted by Statistics Canada, Fort Good Hope had a population of 507 living in 195 of its 231 total private dwellings, a change of −1.7% from its 2016 population of 516. With a land area of 47.25 km^{2} (18.24 sq mi), it had a population density of 10.7/km^{2} (27.8/sq mi) in 2021.

In 2006 the Indigenous population was 465, of which 435 were First Nations, 20 Métis and 10 Inuit.

== Transportation ==
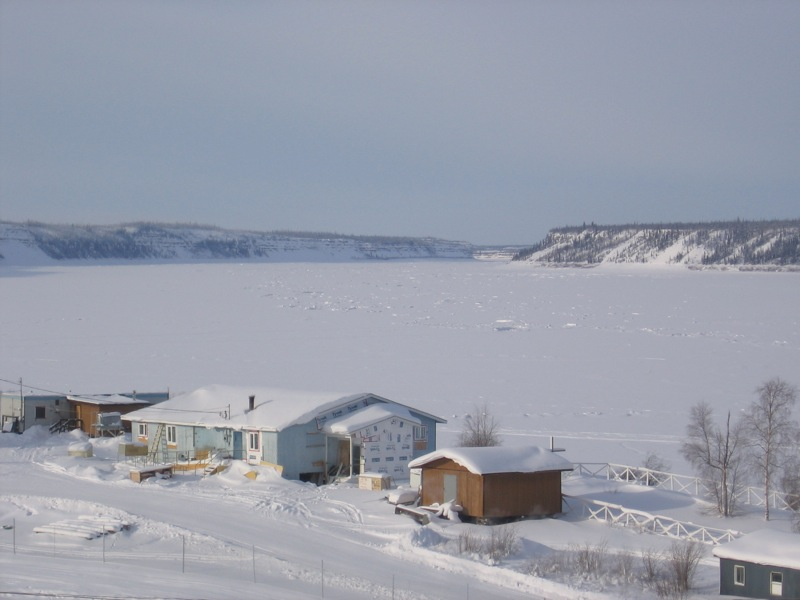
Fort Good Hope looking across the Mackenzie River

The only all season access is by air, Fort Good Hope Airport, with flights operated by North-Wright Airways from Inuvik, Norman Wells and Colville Lake. All flights are non-scheduled passenger service. The old airport runway is now Old Airport Road. The community can be accessed in summer using the Mackenzie River. There is no passenger service and the route is primarily used by the Northern Transportation Company for the summer sealift. Winter access is possible via a winter road from Wrigley located further south. The NWT government is seeking federal funding to help extend the Mackenzie Highway from Wrigley to Tsiigehtchic, where it would connect with the Dempster Highway, as of winter 2014 at least eight major river crossings are in place for the new road, some of which are in use as winter crossings.

== First Nations ==
Fort Good Hope is represented by the K’ahsho Got’ine Community Council and belong to the Sahtu Dene Council. Through the council they are in negotiations with the Government of Canada for a land claims settlement.

== Education ==
Fort Good Hope currently has three institutes providing some form of education.

For pre-school, there is the Fort Good Hope Daycare.

Elementary, junior high and senior high school students attend Chief T'Selehye School. The K-12 school is one of five schools under the Sahtú Divisional Education Council. The current school was rebuilt in 2011 replace the early 1971 building (renovations 1987 and 1994). It also hosts the community library.

For post secondary education Aurora College Learning Centre located in the town allows students to qualify for admission to Aurora College and meet other college and university admission requirements. The closest campus is Inuvik.

== Communication infrastructure ==
- Full postal service - located in the Northern Store
- Satellite television
- Two radio stations
  - VF2070 101.9 FM - re-transmitter for CKLB-FM 101.9 FM
  - CBQE-FM 105.1 CBC Radio North One Inuvik and re-transmitter for CHAK (AM)
- 4G cellular service as of August 20, 2013

== Services ==
There is no hospital in Fort Good Hope and has basic care from the local community counselling centre. Urgent care can be assessed at Sahtú Got'iné Regional Health and Social Services Centre in Norman Wells and critical care requiring hospitalization to Stanton Territorial Hospital in Yellowknife (via air ambulance).

RCMP Fort Good Hope detachment provides general policing in community and under north district of "G" Division, West Region.

Fire services are provided from one fire station near RCMP detachment. The service has two pumpers.

== Climate ==
Fort Good Hope experiences a subarctic climate (Dfc), with cold winters and short, warm summers. The highest temperature ever recorded was 37.4 °C (99 °F) on 8 July 2023.

Fort Good Hope is said to hold the record for the coldest temperature in Canada outside Yukon, when on 31 December 1910, the temperature was recorded as being −79 °F (−62 °C) by Father Houssais. However, this has been disputed, originally by Father Houssais, and later by others as a thermometer reading error.

Climate data for Fort Good Hope (Fort Good Hope Airport) Climate ID: 2201400; coordinates 66°14′27″N 128°39′03″W; elevation: 81.4 m (267 ft); 1991–2020 normals, extremes 1907–present (Note: Composite data from Fort Good Hope Airport: Climate ID: 2201406; coordinates 66°14′26″N 128°39′51″W; elevation: 81.4 m (267 ft) and Fort Good Hope CS: WMO ID: 71491; coordinates 66°14′32″N 128°38′39″W; elevation: 81.7 m (268 ft)); 1991–2020 normals, extremes 1942–present
Month	Jan	Feb	Mar	Apr	May	Jun	Jul	Aug	Sep	Oct	Nov	Dec	Year
Record high humidex	4.6	1.8	16.1	21.8	30.4	36.0	38.3	35.8	25.0	22.7	4.1	5.1	38.3
Record high °C (°F)	6.7 (44.1)	5.6 (42.1)	16.2 (61.2)	21.8 (71.2)	30.5 (86.9)	35.0 (95.0)	37.4 (99.3)	33.9 (93.0)	28.3 (82.9)	22.1 (71.8)	9.7 (49.5)	5.3 (41.5)	37.4 (99.3)
Mean daily maximum °C (°F)	−22.7 (−8.9)	−19.1 (−2.4)	−12.8 (9.0)	0.1 (32.2)	11.7 (53.1)	21.3 (70.3)	22.6 (72.7)	19.0 (66.2)	10.6 (51.1)	−1.1 (30.0)	−14.2 (6.4)	−20.1 (−4.2)	−0.4 (31.3)
Daily mean °C (°F)	−26.5 (−15.7)	−23.8 (−10.8)	−19.1 (−2.4)	−6.5 (20.3)	5.7 (42.3)	15.3 (59.5)	16.9 (62.4)	13.3 (55.9)	5.8 (42.4)	−4.8 (23.4)	−18.1 (−0.6)	−23.9 (−11.0)	−5.5 (22.1)
Mean daily minimum °C (°F)	−30.6 (−23.1)	−28.5 (−19.3)	−25.4 (−13.7)	−13.4 (7.9)	−0.4 (31.3)	9.2 (48.6)	11.0 (51.8)	7.8 (46.0)	1.1 (34.0)	−8.4 (16.9)	−22.2 (−8.0)	−28.1 (−18.6)	−10.7 (12.7)
Record low °C (°F)	−56.2 (−69.2)	−56.2 (−69.2)	−48.3 (−54.9)	−40.0 (−40.0)	−25.0 (−13.0)	−3.3 (26.1)	−1.1 (30.0)	−5.6 (21.9)	−17.0 (1.4)	−38.0 (−36.4)	−47.2 (−53.0)	−52.2 (−62.0)	−56.2 (−69.2)
Record low wind chill	−54.6	−51.2	−49.7	−39.4	−24.0	0.0	0.0	−4.4	−15.5	−31.2	−43.4	−56.4	−56.4
Average precipitation mm (inches)	21.0 (0.83)	19.0 (0.75)	16.1 (0.63)	10.2 (0.40)	14.3 (0.56)	29.6 (1.17)	38.2 (1.50)	41.2 (1.62)	33.0 (1.30)	26.6 (1.05)	22.6 (0.89)	19.7 (0.78)	291.4 (11.47)
Average rainfall mm (inches)	0.0 (0.0)	0.0 (0.0)	0.0 (0.0)	—	7.3 (0.29)	29.2 (1.15)	—	38.8 (1.53)	27.7 (1.09)	—	0.0 (0.0)	0.0 (0.0)	—
Average snowfall cm (inches)	—	19.1 (7.5)	20.3 (8.0)	17.1 (6.7)	—	5.2 (2.0)	0.1 (0.0)	0.0 (0.0)	0.0 (0.0)	6.4 (2.5)	—	26.0 (10.2)	—
Average precipitation days (≥ 0.2 mm)	10.2	10.5	9.4	6.4	5.6	8.1	10.1	11.7	11.0	13.3	12.3	11.4	119.7
Average rainy days (≥ 0.2 mm)	0.0	0.0	0.0	—	2.8	7.1	—	10.2	9.0	—	0.0	0.0	—
Average snowy days (≥ 0.2 cm)	8.2	8.8	8.5	—	2.2	0.07	0.0	0.06	2.1	—	11.5	—	—
Average relative humidity (%) (at 1500 LST)	75.4	70.7	56.0	48.7	46.5	40.7	48.7	56.5	65.3	80.8	82.9	78.8	62.6
Source: Environment and Climate Change Canada (January minimum) (February minimum) (June maximum) (July maximum)

== See also ==
- List of municipalities in the Northwest Territories
