= Slavey language =

Athabaskan language group spoken in Canada

Slavey
- North: Sahtúgot’įné Yatı̨́, K’ashógot’įne Goxedǝ́, Shíhgot’įne Yatı̨́, Dene Kǝdǝ́ South: Dené Dháh, Dene Yatıé, Dene Zhatıé
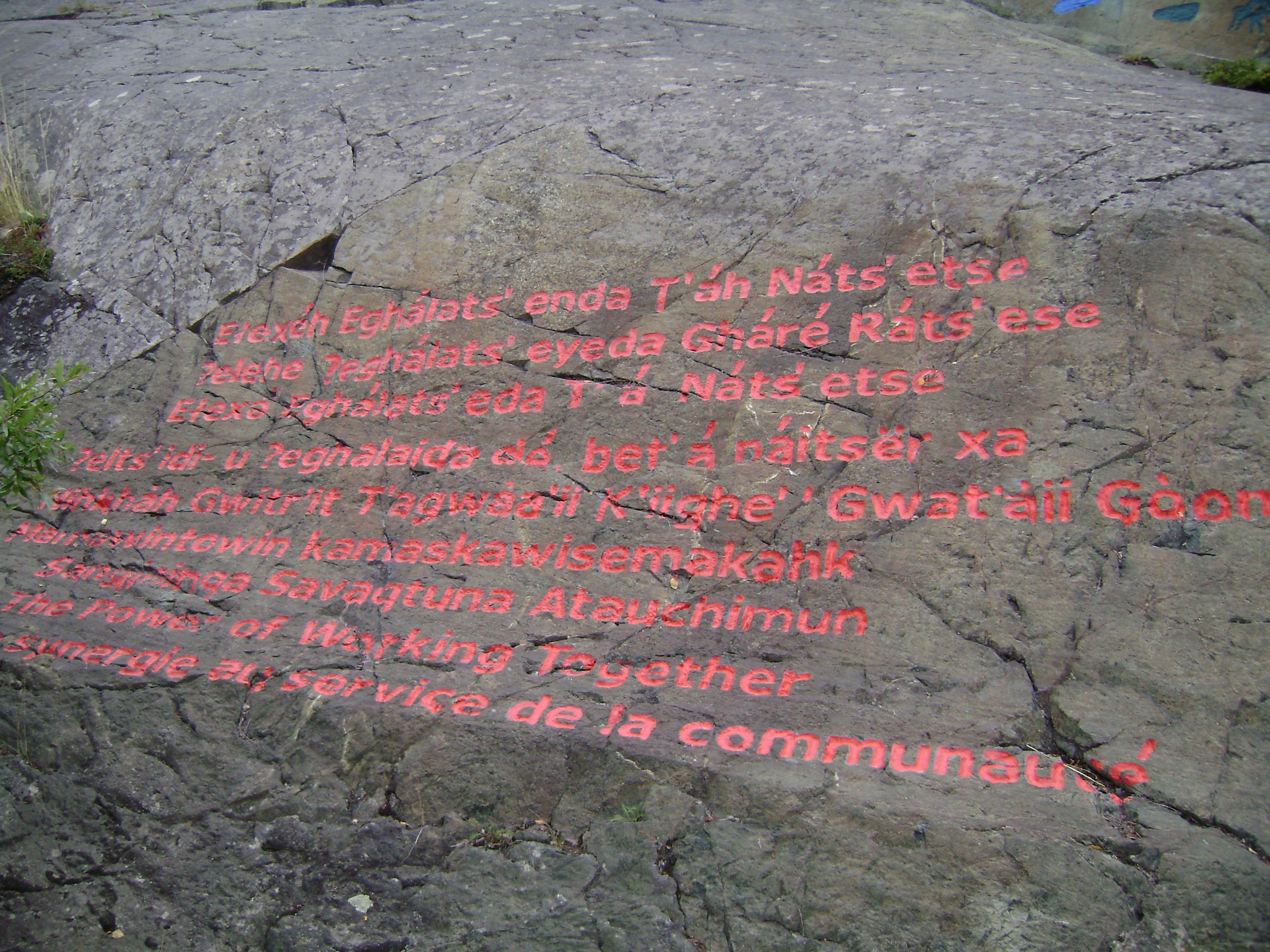
- North Slavey text carved into stone in Yellowknife
- Native to: Denendeh, Canada
- Region: Northwest Territories
- Ethnicity: Slavey, Sahtu
- Native speakers: 2,215 (2021 census)
- Language family: Na-Dené: Athabaskan; Northern Athabaskan; Slavey

Official status
- Official language in: Northwest Territories, Canada

Language codes
- ISO 639-2: den
- ISO 639-3: den – inclusive code Individual codes: scs – North Slavey xsl – South Slavey
- Glottolog: slav1253
- North Slavey is classified as Definitely Endangered by the UNESCO Atlas of the World's Languages in Danger.

Dene / Slavey "People" / "Awokanak"
- Person: Dene
- People: Got'iné (North); Sahtúgot’įné ("Great Bear Lake"); K’ashógot’įne ("Hareskin"); Shíhgot’įne ("Mountain"); Dehcho / Dene Tha' (South)
- Language: Got'iné Kedé / Got'iné Yatí; Sahtúgot’įné Kədǝ́ K’ashógot’įne Xədǝ́ Shíhgot’įne Yatı̨́ Dene Yatié / Dene Zhatié
- Country: Denendeh, Got'iné Néné (North), Sahtúgot’įné Nę́nę́ K’ashógot’įne Nę́né; Shıhgot’ıné Nę́nę́ Dene Ndéh (South), Dehchondéh; Dene Tha' Ndéh

Slavey (/ˈsleɪvi/ SLAY-vee; also Slave, Slavé) is a group of Athabaskan languages and a dialect continuum spoken amongst the Dene peoples of Canada in the Northwest Territories – or central Denendeh – where it also has official status. The languages are primarily written using a modified Latin script, with some using Canadian Aboriginal syllabics. In their own languages, these languages are referred to as: Sahtúgot’įné Yatı̨́ (spoken by the Sahtu Dene), K’ashógot’įne Goxedǝ́ (the Hare Dene dialect) and Shíhgot’įne Yatı̨́ (the Mountain dialect) in the North, and Dené Dháh (primarily by the Dene Tha' in Alberta), Dene Yatıé or Dene Zhatıé in the South.

== North Slavey and South Slavey ==
Sahtu (North Slavey) communities in the Northwest Territories

North Slavey is spoken by the Sahtu (North Slavey) people in the Mackenzie District along the middle Mackenzie River from Tulita (Fort Norman) north, around Great Bear Lake, and in the Mackenzie Mountains of the Canadian territory of Northwest Territories. The dialect has around 800 speakers.

Northern Slavey is an amalgamation of three separate dialects:

- K’ashógot’įne (ᑲᑊᗱᑯᑎᑊᓀ) Goxedǝ́: Hare, spoken by the Gahwié got’iné - "Rabbitskin People" or K’áshogot’ıne - "Great Hare People", referring to their dependence on the varying hare for food and clothing, also called Peaux de Lièvre or Locheaux
- Sahtúgot’įné (ᓴᑋᕲᒼᑯᑎᑊᓀ) Yatı̨́: Bear Lake, spoken by the Sahtu Dene or Sahtú got’iné - "Bear Lake People", also known as Gens du Lac d'Ours
- Shíhgot’įne (ᗰᑋᑯᑎᑊᓀ) Yatı̨́: Mountain, spoken by the Shıhgot’ıné, Shuhtaot'iné or Shotah Dene - "Mountain People" or Mountain Indians, also called Nahagot’iné, Nahaa or Nahane Dene - "People of the west", so called because they lived in the mountains west of the other Slavey groups, between the Mackenzie Mountains and the Mackenzie River, from the Redstone River to the Mountain River

South Slavey (ᑌᓀ ᒐ Dené Dháh, Dene Yatıé or Dene Zhatıé) is spoken by the Slavey people, who were also known as Dehghaot'ine, Deh Cho, Etchareottine (Note: Or A-cha-o-tin-ne, Achaotinne, Acheotenne, A-che-to-e-ten-ni, Achetoetenni, Acheto-e-Tinne, Achetoetinne, Acheto-tena, Achetotinna, Ache-to-tin'neh, Acheto-tinneh, Achetotinneh, Achoto-e-tenni, Achotoetenni.) ("people dwelling in the shelter"), in the region of Great Slave Lake, upper Mackenzie River (Deh Cho - "Big River") and its drainage, in the District of Mackenzie, northwest Alberta, and northeast British Columbia.

Some communities are bilingual, with the children learning Slavey at home and English when they enter school. Still other communities are monolingual in Slavey The dialect has around 1,000 speakers.

Alternative names: Slavi, Slave, Dené, Mackenzian

The division of Slavey dialects is based largely on the way each one pronounces the old Proto-Athapaskan sounds *dz *ts *ts’ *s and *z.

== Status ==
North and South Slavey are recognized as official languages of the Northwest Territories; they may be used in court and in debates and proceedings of the Northwest Territories legislature. However, unlike English and French, the government only publishes laws and documents in North and South Slavey if the legislature requests it, and these documents are not authoritative.

In 2015, a Slavey woman named Andrea Heron challenged the territorial government over its refusal to permit the ʔ character, representing the Slavey glottal stop, in her daughter's name, Sakaeʔah, despite Slavey languages being official in the NWT. The territory argued that territorial and federal identity documents were unable to accommodate the character. Heron had registered the name with a hyphen instead of the ʔ when her daughter was born, but when Sakaeʔah was 6, Ms. Heron joined a challenge by a Chipewyan woman named Shene Catholique-Valpy regarding the same character in her own daughter's name, Sahaiʔa.

Also in 2015, the University of Victoria launched a language revitalization program in the NWT, pairing learners of indigenous languages including Slavey with fluent speakers. The program requires 100 hours of conversation with the mentor with no English allowed, as well as sessions with instructors in Fort Providence.

== Phonology ==
=== Consonants ===
		Labial	Alveolar			Post- alveolar	Dorsal	Glottal
		Labial	plain	sibilant	lateral	Post- alveolar	Dorsal	Glottal
Plosive/ Affricate	plain	p	t	ts	tɬ	tʃ	k	ʔ
Plosive/ Affricate	aspirated		tʰ	tsʰ	tɬʰ	tʃʰ	kʰ	ʔ
Plosive/ Affricate	ejective		tʼ	tsʼ	tɬʼ	tʃʼ	kʼ	ʔ
Fricative	voiceless			s	ɬ	ʃ	x	h
Fricative	voiced			z	ɮ	ʒ	ɣ	
Nasal		m	n					
Approximant		w					j	

The consonant inventories in the dialects of Slavey differ considerably. The table above lists the 30 consonants common to most or all varieties. Hare lacks aspirated affricates (on red background), which have lenited into fricatives, whereas Mountain lacks /w/ (on blue). In addition, for some speakers of Hare, an alveolar flap /ɾ/ has developed into a separate phoneme. Prenasalized stops /ᵐb, ⁿd/ may appear in Slavey proper.

The most pronounced difference is however the realization of a series of consonants that vary greatly in their place of articulation:

	Slavey proper	Mountain	Bearlake	Hare
Plain stop/affricate	t̪θ	p	kʷ	kʷ, p
Aspirated	t̪θʰ	pʰ	kʷʰ	f
Ejective	t̪θʼ	pʼ	kʷʼ	ʔw
Voiceless fricative	θ	f	ʍ	w
Voiced fricative / semivowel	ð	v	w	w

In Slavey proper, these are dental affricates and fricatives; comparative Athabaskan work reveals this to be the oldest sound value. Mountain has labials, with the voiceless stop coinciding with pre-existing /p/. Bearlake has labialized velars, but has lenited the voiced fricative to coincide with pre-existing /w/. The most complicated situation is found in Hare, where the plain stop is a labialized velar, the ejective member is replaced by a /ʔw/ sequence, the aspirated affricate has turned into a fricative /f/, and both the voiceless and voiced fricatives have been lenited to /w/.

==== Phonological processes ====
The following phonological and phonetic statements apply to all four dialects of Slavey.

- Unaspirated obstruents are either voiceless or weakly voiced, e.g.
  - /k/ → [k] or [k̬]
- Aspirated obstruents are strongly aspirated.
- Ejectives are strongly ejective.
- When occurring between vowels, ejectives are often voiced, e.g.
  - /kʼ/ → [ɡˀ] or [kʼ]
- /t͡sʰ/ is usually strongly velarized, i.e. [tˣ].
- Velar obstruents are palatalized before front vowels, e.g.
  - /kɛ/ → [cɛ]
  - /xɛ/ → [çɛ]
  - /ɣɛ/ → [ʝɛ]
- Velar fricatives may be labialized before round vowels.
  - The voiceless fricative is usually labialized, e.g.
    - /xo/ → [xʷo]
  - The voiced fricative is optionally labialized and may additionally be deaffricated e.g.
    - /ɣo/ → [ɣo] or [ɣʷo] or [wo]
- Velar stops are also labialized before round vowels. These labialized velars are not as heavily rounded as labial velars (which occur in Bearlake and Hare), e.g.
  - /ko/ → [kʷo]
  - /kʷo/ → [k̹ʷwo]
- Lateral affricates are generally alveolar, but sometimes velar, i.e.
  - /tɬ/ → [tɬ] or [kɬ]
  - /tɬʰ/ → [tɬʰ] or [kɬʰ]
  - /tɬʼ/ → [tɬʼ] or [kɬʼ]
- /x/ may be velar or glottal, i.e.
  - /x/ → [x] or [h]

=== Vowels ===
Oral
	Front	Central	Back
Close	i		u
Close-mid	e ⟨ə⟩		o
Open-mid	ɛ		
Open		a	

- a [a]
- e [ɛ] or [æ] when followed by a back vowel
- ə [e] or [ie]
- i [i] or [ɪ] in syllable onset
- o [o]
- u [u]
- nasal vowels are marked with an ogonek accent, e.g. ⟨ą⟩ [ã]
- Vowel length is distributed as /VV/ in the dialects of Bearlake, Slavey and Mountain.
- South Slavey does not have the ⟨ə⟩ vowel.

=== Tone ===
Slavey has two tones:

- high
- low

In Slavey orthography, high tone is marked with an acute accent, and low tone is unmarked.

Tones are both lexical and grammatical.

Lexical: /ɡáh/ 'along' vs. /ɡàh/ 'rabbit'

=== Syllable structure ===
Slavey morphemes have underlying syllable structures in the stems: CV, CVC, CVnC, V, and VC. The prefixes of the stem occur as Cv, CVC, VC, CV, and C.

Stem structure	Example	English gloss
CV	tu	"water"
CVC	ʔah	"snowshoe"
CVnC	mį́h	"net"
V	-e	Postposition
VC	-éh	"with"

Prefix structure	Example	English gloss
CV	de-	inceptive
CVC	teh-	"into water"
V	í-	seriative
VC	ah-	second-person singular subject
C	h-	classifier (voice element)

== Writing system ==
Slavey alphabet (1973)

a	c	chʼ	d	ddh	dh	dl	dz	e	g
/a/	/tʃʰ/	/tʃʼ/	/t/	/t̪θ/	/ð/	/tɬ/	/ts/	/e/	/k/
gh	h	i	j	k	kʼ	l	ł	m	mb
/ɣ/	/h/	/i/	/tʃ/	/kʰ/	/kʼ/	/l/	/ɬ/	/m/	/ᵐb/
n	nd	o	r	s	sh	t	th	tł	tłʼ
/n/	/ⁿd/	/o/	/ɾ/	/s/	/ʃ/	/tʰ/	/θ/	/tɬʰ/	/tɬʼ/
ts	tsʼ	tth	tthʼ	tʼ	u	w	y	z	zh	ʔ
/tsʰ/	/tsʼ/	/t̪θʰ/	/t̪θʼ/	/tʼ/	/u/	/w/	/j/	/z/	/ʒ/	/ʔ/

Tone is indicated with an acute accent and the ogonek indicates nasalization.

North Slavey alphabet

- ʔ
- a
- b
- ch
- chʼ
- d
- dl
- dz
- e
- ǝ
- f
- g
- gh
- gw
- h
- ı
- j
- k
- kw
- kʼ
- kwʼ
- l
- ł
- m
- n
- o
- p
- pʼ
- r
- s
- sh
- t
- tʼ
- tł
- tłʼ
- ts
- tsʼ
- u
- v
- w
- wh
- wʼ
- x
- y
- z
- zh

South Slavey alphabet

- ʔ
- a
- b
- ch
- chʼ
- d
- dh
- ddh
- dl
- dz
- e
- f
- g
- gh
- h
- ı
- j
- k
- kʼ
- l
- ł
- m
- mb
- n
- nd
- o
- p
- pʼ
- r
- s
- sh
- t
- tʼ
- th
- tth
- tthʼ
- tł
- tłʼ
- ts
- tsʼ
- u
- v
- w
- x
- y
- z
- zh

== Morphology ==
Slavey, like many Athabascan languages, has a very specific morpheme order in the verb in which the stem must come last. The morpheme order is shown in the following chart.

Position	Description
Position 000	Adverb
Position 00	Object of incorporated postposition
Position 0	Incorporated postposition
Position 1	Adverbial
Position 2	Distributive (yá-)
Position 3	Customary (na-)
Position 4	Incorporated stem
Position 5	Number
Position 6	Direct Object
Position 7	Deictic
Position 8	Theme/derivation
Position 9	Aspect/derivation
Position 10	Conjugation
Position 11	Mode
Position 12	Subject
Position 13	Classifier
Position 14	Stem

A Slavey verb must minimally have positions 13 and 14 to be proper. Here are some examples:

xayadedhtí
Morphemes	xa	ya	de	d	h	tí
Position	1	1	9	13	13	14
Translation	'S/he prayed'					

godee
Morphemes	go	∅	deeh
Position	6	13	14
Translation	'S/he talks'		

dagodee
Morphemes	da	go	∅	dee
Position	4	6	13	14
Translation	'S/he stutters'			

== Person, number and gender ==
=== Gender ===
Slavey marks gender by means of prefixation on the verb theme. There are three different genders, one of which is unmarked; the other two are marked by prefixes [go-] and [de-]. However, only certain verb themes allow gender prefixes.

[go-] is used for nouns which mark location in either time or space. Some examples of these areal nouns are house (kǫ́é), land (déh), river (deh), and winter (xay). The gender pronoun can be a direct object, an oblique object or a possessor.

kų́é godetl’éh
house 3SG.paints.area
'S/he is painting the house.'

kǫ́é gocha
house {area.in shelter}
'in the shelter of the house'

kǫ́é godeshįtée
house area.floor
'floor of the house'

[de-] marks wood, leaves and branches. This gender is optional: some speakers use it and others do not.

tse déla
wood {}
'wood is located'

ʔǫ́k’ay t’oge déʔo̜
bird nest {wooden O is located}
'A bird’s nest is located'

tse ts’edehdlá
wood 3SG.split.wood
'S/he is splitting wood.'

=== Number ===
Slavey marks number in the subject prefixes in position 12. The dual is marked by the prefix łéh- (Sl)/łe- (Bl)/le- (Hr).

ni̒łe̒gehtthe
'They two got stuck in a narrow passage.'

The plural is marked with the prefix go-.

Dahgogehthe
'They dance.'

ʔeha̒goni̒dhe
'We go for meat.'

=== Person ===
Slavey has first, second, third, and fourth person. When in position 12, acting as a subject, first-person singular is /h-/, second-person singular is /ne-/, first-person dual/plural is /i̒d-/, and second person plural is marked by /ah-/. Third person is not marked in this position. When occurring as a direct or indirect object, the pronoun prefixes change and fourth person becomes relevant.

- First-person singular takes se-.
- Second-person singular takes ne-
- Third person is marked by be-/me-
- Fourth person is marked by ye-

== Classification ==
Like most Athabaskan languages, Slavey has a multitude of classifications. There are five basic categories that describe the nature of an object. Some of these categories are broken up further.

Class	Description	Locative prefix	Active Prefix	Examples
1a	One dimensional slender, rigid and elongated objects	Ø-to	∅-tį́,-tǫ, -tǫ́	gun, canoe, pencil
1b	One directions flexible objects, ropelike; plurals	∅-ɫa	∅-ɫee, -ɫa, -ɫee	thread, snowshoes, rope
2a	two dimensional flexible	h-chú	h-chuh, -chú, -chu	open blanket, open tent, paper
2b	Two dimensional rigid objects	N/A	N/A	no specific lexical item
3	Solid roundish objects; chunky objects	∅-ʔǫ	∅-ʔáh, -ʔǫ, -ʔá	ball, rock, stove, loaf of bread
4a	Small containerful	∅-kǫ	∅-káh, -kǫ, -kah	pot of coffee, puppies in a basket, cup of tea
4b	Large containerful	h-tǫ	h-tį́h, -tǫ, tǫ́	full gas tank, bucket of water, bag of flour
5	Animate	∅-tí͔	∅-téh, -tį́, -té, h-téh, -tį	Any living thing

tewhehchú
water.CL
'A clothlike object is in the water'

== Tense and aspect ==
=== Tense ===
Slavey has only one structural tense: future. Other tenses can be indicated periphrastically.

An immediate future can be formed by the de- inceptive (position 9) plus y-.

dałe
{3.FUT.start out}
'S/he is just ready to go.'

nadedajéh
{3.FUT.start to heal}
'It is just starting to heal.'

=== Aspect ===
Slavey has two semantic aspects: perfective and imperfective.

The perfective is represented in position 11:

déhtla
{3SG.PFV.start off}
'S/he started off.'

whá goyįdee
long 3SG.PFV.talk
'S/he talked for a long time.'

The perfective can also be used with a past tense marker to indicate that at the point of reference, which is sometime in the past, the event was completed

kǫ́é góhtsį yįlé
house {3SG.PFV.build area} PAST
'He had built a house.'

The imperfective indicates that the reference time precedes the end of the event time:

hejį
3.IPFV.sing
'S/he sings, s/he is singing.'

kǫ́é gohtsį begháyeyidá
house {3.IPFV.build area} 1SG.PFV.see.3
'I saw him building a house.'

== Word order ==
Slavey is a verb-final language. The basic word order is SOV.

dene ʔelá thehtsį
man boat 3SG.made
'The man made the boat.'

tlį ts’ǫ́dani káyįk’á
dog child 3SG.bit
'The dog bit the child.'

Oblique objects precede the direct object.

t’eere denǫ gha ʔerákeeʔee wihsį
girl mother for parka 3SG.made
'The girl made a parka for her mother.'

== Case ==
Slavey has no case markings. To differentiate between subject, direct object, and oblique objects, word order is used. The subject will be the first noun phrase, and the direct object will occur right before the verb. The oblique objects are controlled by postpositions.

== Possessives ==
Possessive pronoun prefixes are found in Slavey. These pronouns have the same forms as the direct and oblique object pronouns. The prefixes are listed below with examples.

=== se- first-person singular ===
bá 'mitts'
sebáré 'my mitts'

mbeh 'knife'
sembehé 'my knife'

=== ne- second-person singular ===
ts'ah 'hat'
net'saré 'your (SG) hat'

tl'uh 'rope'
netl'ulé 'your (SG) rope'

=== be-/me- third-person singular ===
melįé nátla
3.POSS.dog 3SG.is.fast
'His/her dog is fast.'

bekée whihtsį
3SG.POSS.slippers 1SG.made
'I made his/her slippers.'

=== ye- fourth person ===
yekée whehtsį
4.POSS.slippers 3SG.made
'S/he made his/her slippers.'

=== ʔe- unspecified possessor ===
ʔelįé 'someone's dog'

=== naxe-/raxe- first-person plural, second-person plural. ===
ts'éré 'blanket'
naxets'éré 'our blanket, your (PL) blanket'

=== ku-/ki-/go- third-person plural ===
kulí̜é rała
3PL.POSS.dog 3SG.is.fast
'Their dog is fast.'

goyúé k'enáʔeniihtse
3PL.POSS.clothes 1SG.washed
'I washed their clothes.'

== Clauses ==
=== Conjunctions ===
There are both coordinating and subordinating conjunctions in Slavey.

==== Coordinating ====
===== gots'éh "and, and then" =====
tse tádiihtthį gots'ę goyíi naehddhí
wood 1SG.cut and area.in 1SG.warmed
'I cut some wood and then I warmed myself up inside.'

dene ʔéhdá jíye kanįwę gots'ę ʔéhdá daʔuʔa
people some berry 3SG.picks and some 3.OPT.fish
'Some people will pick berries and some will fish.'

===== kúlú, kólí, kúú, kóó, ékóó, góa "but" =====
ʔekǫ́ náohtlah nehthę góa nehji
there 1SG.opt.go 1SG.want but 1SG.be.afraid
'I want to go there but I'm afraid.'

sine ts'ǫ́dane gogháiidá kúlú dedine gołį ʔajá
1SG child 1SG.saw.3PL but 3SG instead 3.became
"I was supposed to watch the children, but he did it instead."

==== Subordinating conjunctions ====
===== ʔenįdé, nįdé, ndé, néh "if, when, whenever" =====
ʔįts'é gehk'é nįdé segha máhsi
moose 3PL.shoot if 1SG.for thanks
'If they shoot a moose, I'll be grateful.'

Dora bekwí ohts'í nįwę nįdé yehts'í
Dora 3.head 1SG.OPT.comb 3SG.wants if 3SG.combs.4
'Whenever Dora wants to comb my hair, she combs it.'

===== -were "before" =====
shuruhté were selejée daderéʔǫ ʔagúlá
{1SG.OPT.go to sleep} before woodbox 3.is.full 1SG.made.area
'Before I went to bed, I filled to woodbox.'

===== -ts'ę "since, from" =====
segǫ́łį gots'ę jǫ deneilé
1SG.was.born area.from here 1SG.lived
'I lived here since I was born.'

===== -hé "because, so" =====
se wehse yihé godihk'ǫ yíle
wood 3.is.wet because 1SG.make.fire NEG
'Because the wood is wet, I can't make fire.'

=== Relative clauses ===
There are three important parts to a relative clause. There is the head, which is the noun that is modified or delimited. The second part is the restricting sentence. The sentence modifies the head noun. The last part is the complementizer.

ʔeyi [dene] goyidee i hįshá
the [man] 1SG.talked COMP 3SG.is.tall
'The man whom I talked to is tall.'

lį gah hedéhfe i gháyeyidá
dog rabbit 3SG.chased COMP 1SG.saw
'I saw the dog that chased the rabbit.'

== In popular culture ==
Slavey was the native language spoken by the fictional band in the Canadian television series North of 60. Nick Sibbeston, a former Premier of the Northwest Territories, was a Slavey language and culture consultant for the show.

== See also ==
- Broken Slavey
