= Sahtu Dene and Metis Comprehensive Land Claim Agreement =

1993 indigenous land-claim agreement in Canada's Northwest Territories

The Sahtu Dene and Metis Comprehensive Land Claim Agreement, is a comprehensive lands claim agreement between The Crown in the right of Canada and the Dene and Métis of the Sahtu area in the Northwest Territories. The agreement was signed by the Chiefs of the Sahtu Dene bands, the presidents of the Metis Locals, the Minister of Indian Affairs, and the Premier of the Northwest Territories on September 6, 1993, in Tulita (then called Fort Norman) and came into effect on June 23, 1994. The agreement is a Modern Treaty which is protected by Section 35 of the Constitution of Canada.

The agreement includes recognizing Sahtu Dene and Metis ownership of 41,437 km² of land in the Mackenzie River Valley. This includes subsurface or mineral rights to 1,813 km² of land.

The Government of Canada agreed to negotiate self-government agreements on a community by community basis with the five Sahtu communities of Colville Lake, Fort Good Hope, Tulita, Deline, and Norman Wells.

The Sahtu Dene and Metis received a tax-free payment of $75 million (1990 dollars) over a 15-year period. They receive a share of annual resource revenues from development in the Mackenzie Valley as per the agreement, including a share in Norman Wells oil and gas royalties.

Negotiated terms regarding the 1944 oil production under the Norman Wells Proven Area Agreement are found in Chapter 9.

The Sahtu Dene and Metis maintain exclusive right to trap and the right to hunt and fish throughout in a 280,238 square kilometre area which includes Great Bear Lake.
