= Sahtu Region =

- Administrative region
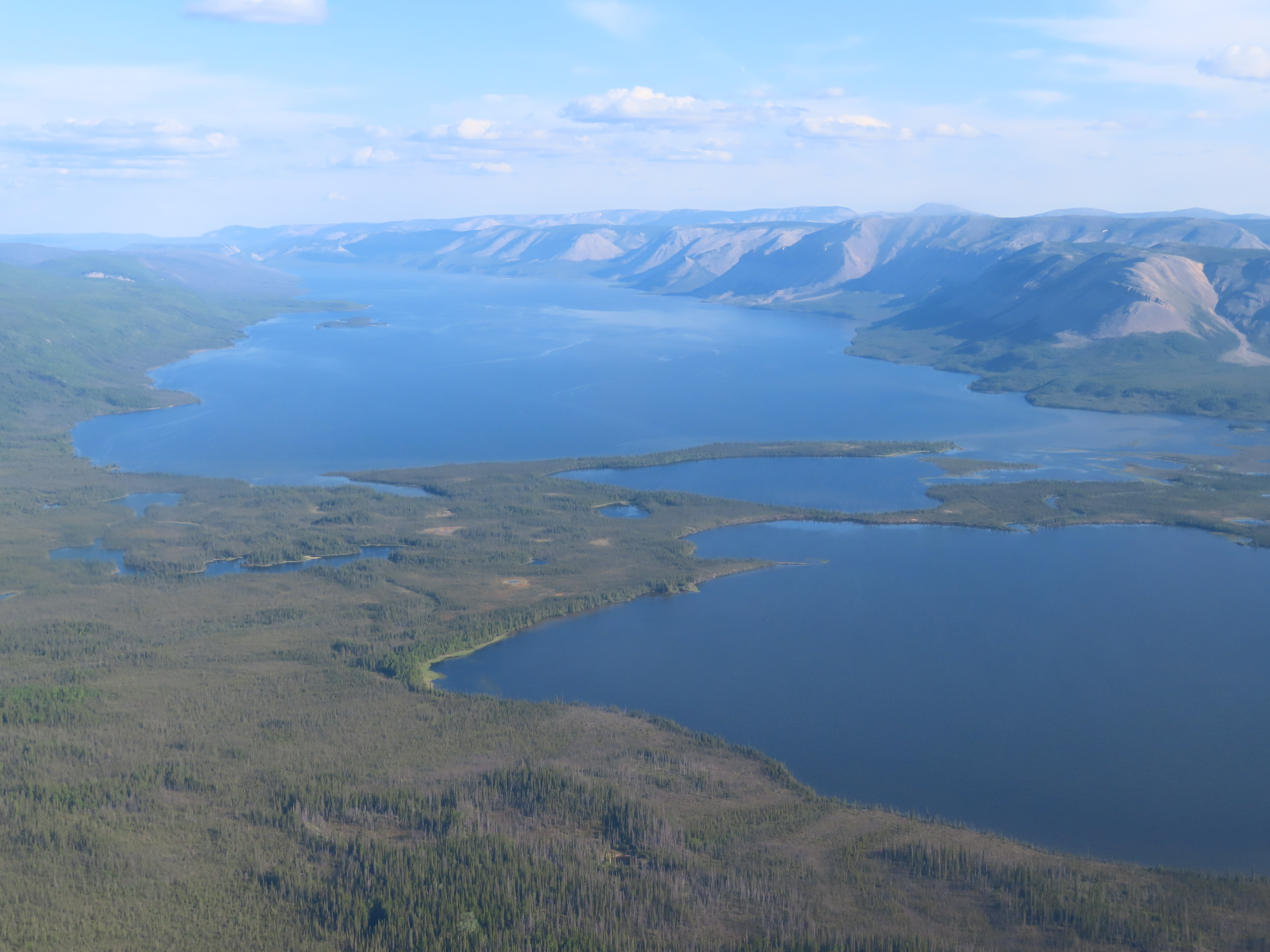
- Norman Range and Kelly Lake

- Location within the Northwest Territories
- Country: Canada
- Territory: Northwest Territories
- Territorial riding: Sahtu
- Settlement area: Sahtu
- Regional office: Norman Wells

Area
  - Total: 283,171 km^{2} (109,333 sq mi)

Population (2021)
  - Total: 2,259
  - Rank: 4th NWT
  - Density: 0.007978/km^{2} (0.02066/sq mi)
  - % change (from 2016): −7.7
- Time zone: UTC−07:00 (MST)
  - Summer (DST): UTC−06:00 (DST)

North Slave Region communities in the Northwest Territories

The Sahtu Region is an administrative region in Canada's Northwest Territories. Coterminous with the settlement region described in the 1993 Sahtu Dene and Metis Comprehensive Land Claim Agreement, 41,437 km^{2} (15,999 sq mi) of the Sahtu is collectively owned by its Indigenous Sahtu (Dene) and Métis inhabitants. Although the region's population is predominantly First Nations, a significant non-Indigenous presence exists in Norman Wells, the regional office, established in 1920 to serve the only producing oilfield in the Canadian Territories. Considered to be of vital strategic importance during World War II in the event of a Japanese invasion of Alaska, the region's petroleum resources were exploited by the United States Army with the Canol Project, but the pipeline never became necessary and ultimately operated for less than one year.

Since the abandonment of the Canol project, development within the region has been more limited than in the rest of the territory. Although plans have long existed for pipelines and highways to parallel the Mackenzie River through the Sahtu en route to the Arctic Ocean, the landmark Mackenzie Valley Pipeline Inquiry recommended that a moratorium be placed on construction until local Indigenous land claims could be settled. To this day, no all-weather roads connect the Sahtu with the rest of Canada, and the contiguous North American pipeline network finds its northernmost terminus at Norman Wells, which was connected to Zama City, Alberta in 1984. Ground transportation is seasonally provided by a network of winter and ice roads, while the abandoned Canol route now forms part of the Trans Canada Trail system.

== Etymology ==
Sahtú is the Dene name of Great Bear Lake, the largest lake entirely in Canada, which is entirely contained within the Sahtu Region. The name is also used by the area's First Nations inhabitants to describe themselves and their language, the Sahtú Dene people (historically known as the North Slavey or Hareskins). It has been further adopted by the Sahtu Dene Council and the Sahtu Secretariat, both Indigenous institutions which share administrative responsibilities with the Government of the Northwest Territories within the region.

== Communities ==
The Sahtu Region consists of five communities, with no permanent population recorded outside their boundaries. Norman Wells, the regional capital, was founded in the early 20th century in order to exploit local oil deposits and has a majority non-Indigenous population. The other communities of the Sahtu are predominantly First Nations.

Communities of the Sahtu Region
Community				Demographics (2021)					
Name		Governance		Census		Indigenous population profile			
Official	Traditional	Type	Municipality	Total	Change (from 2016)	First Nations	Métis	Inuit	Other
Colville Lake	K'áhbamı̨́túé	Settlement Corporation	No	110	−14.7%	105	0	0	0
Délı̨nę	Délı̨ne	Charter Community	Yes	573	7.5%	495	10	10	45
Fort Good Hope	Rádeyı̨lı̨kóé	Charter Community	Yes	507	−1.7%	435	15	10	40
Norman Wells	Tłegǫ́htı̨	Town	Yes	673	−13.5%	175	80	20	375
Tulita	Tulı́t’a	Hamlet	Yes	396	−17%	320	40	10	30

Historical population

Year	Pop.	±%
2001	2,527	—
2002	2,522	−0.2%
2003	2,549	+1.1%
2004	2,576	+1.1%
2005	2,582	+0.2%
2006	2,582	+0.0%
2007	2,583	+0.0%
2008	2,542	−1.6%
2009	2,523	−0.7%

Year	Pop.	±%
2010	2,492	−1.2%
2011	2,427	−2.6%
2012	2,445	+0.7%
2013	2,456	+0.4%
2014	2,479	+0.9%
2015	2,538	+2.4%
2016	2,554	+0.6%
2017	2,545	−0.4%
2021	2,259	−11.2%

Sources: NWT Bureau of Statistics (2001 - 2017)

== Communities of the Sahtu Region ==
Communities of the Sahtu Region
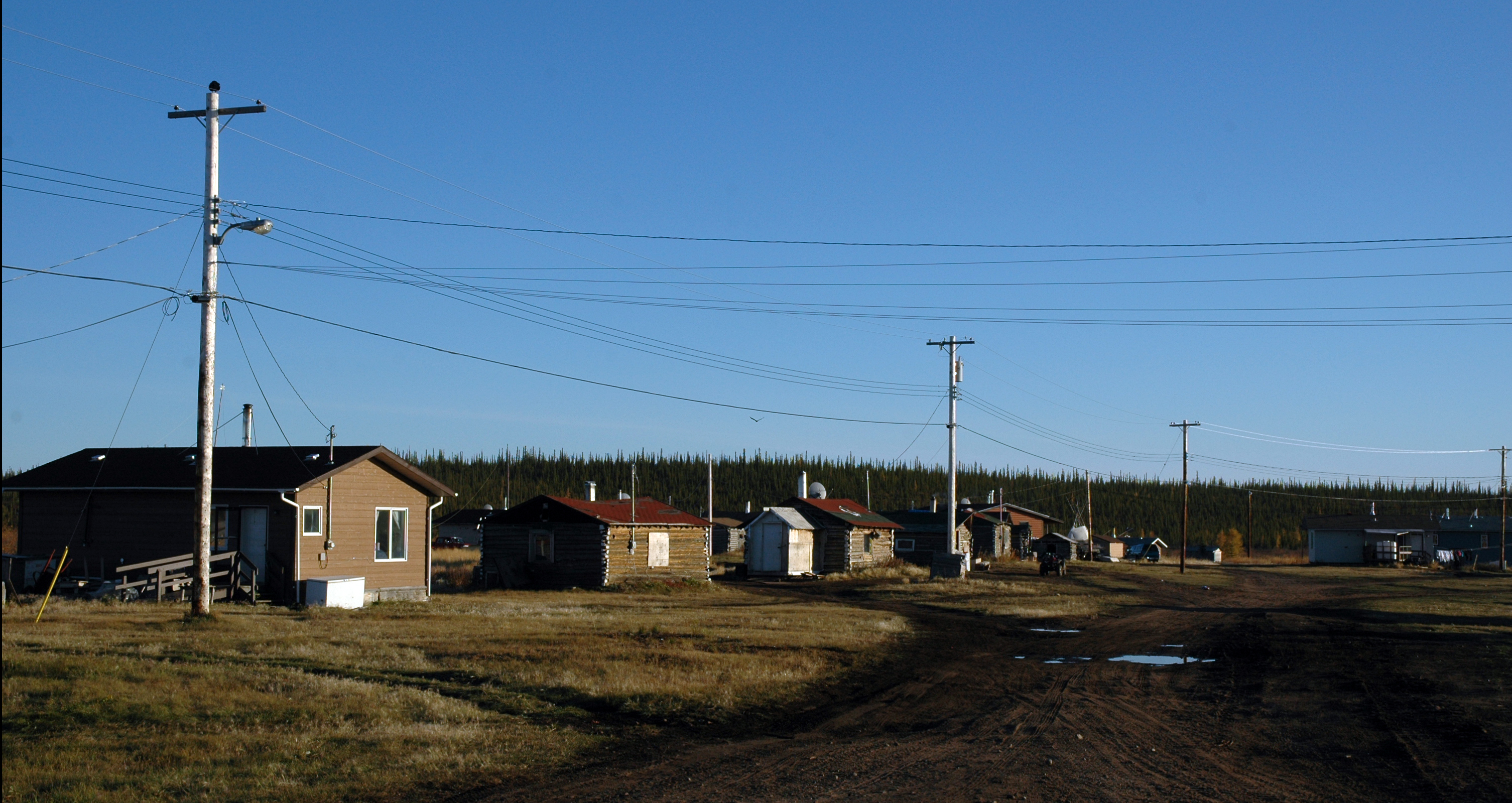
Colville Lake (2006)

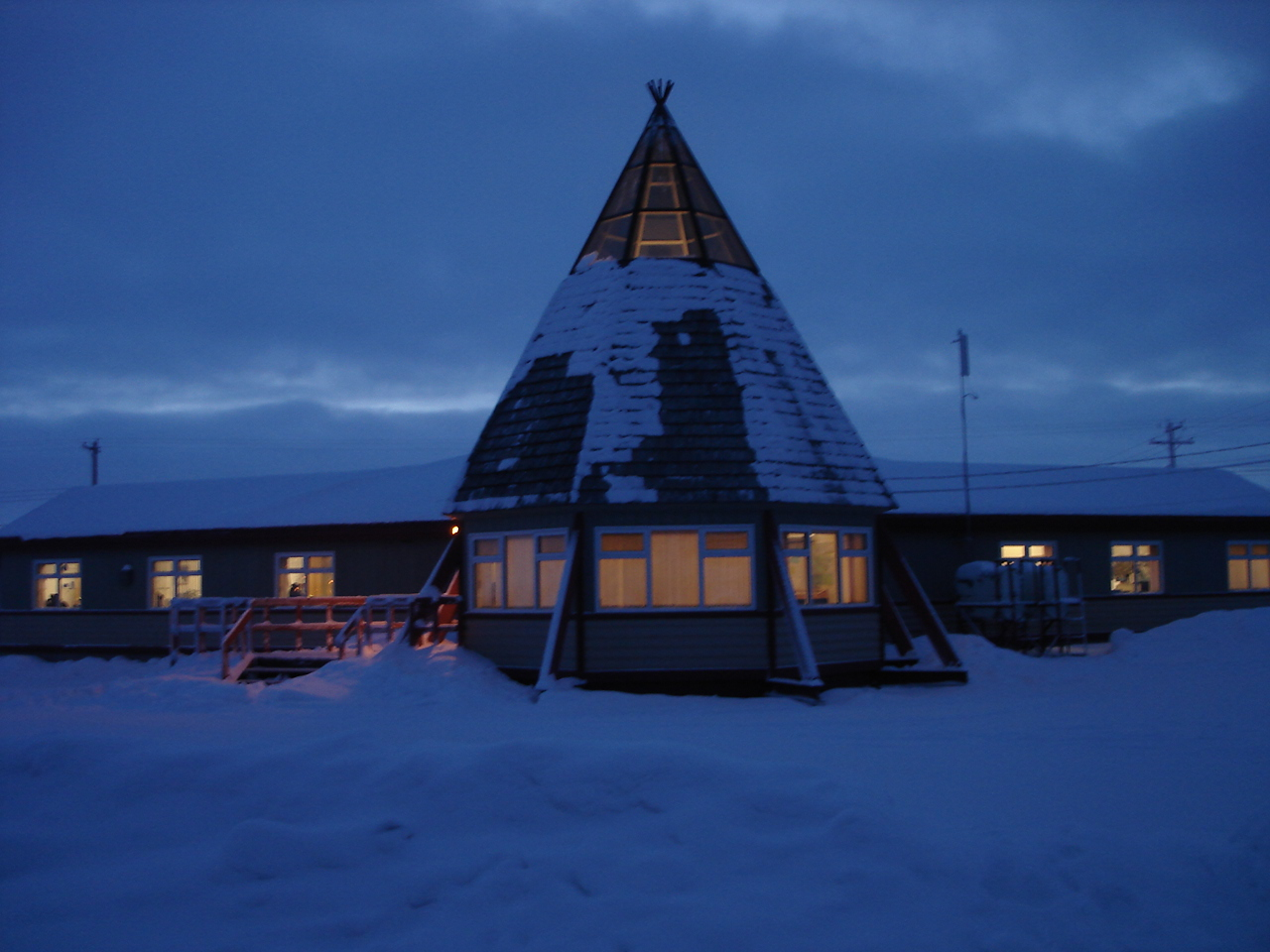
Délı̨nę (2006)

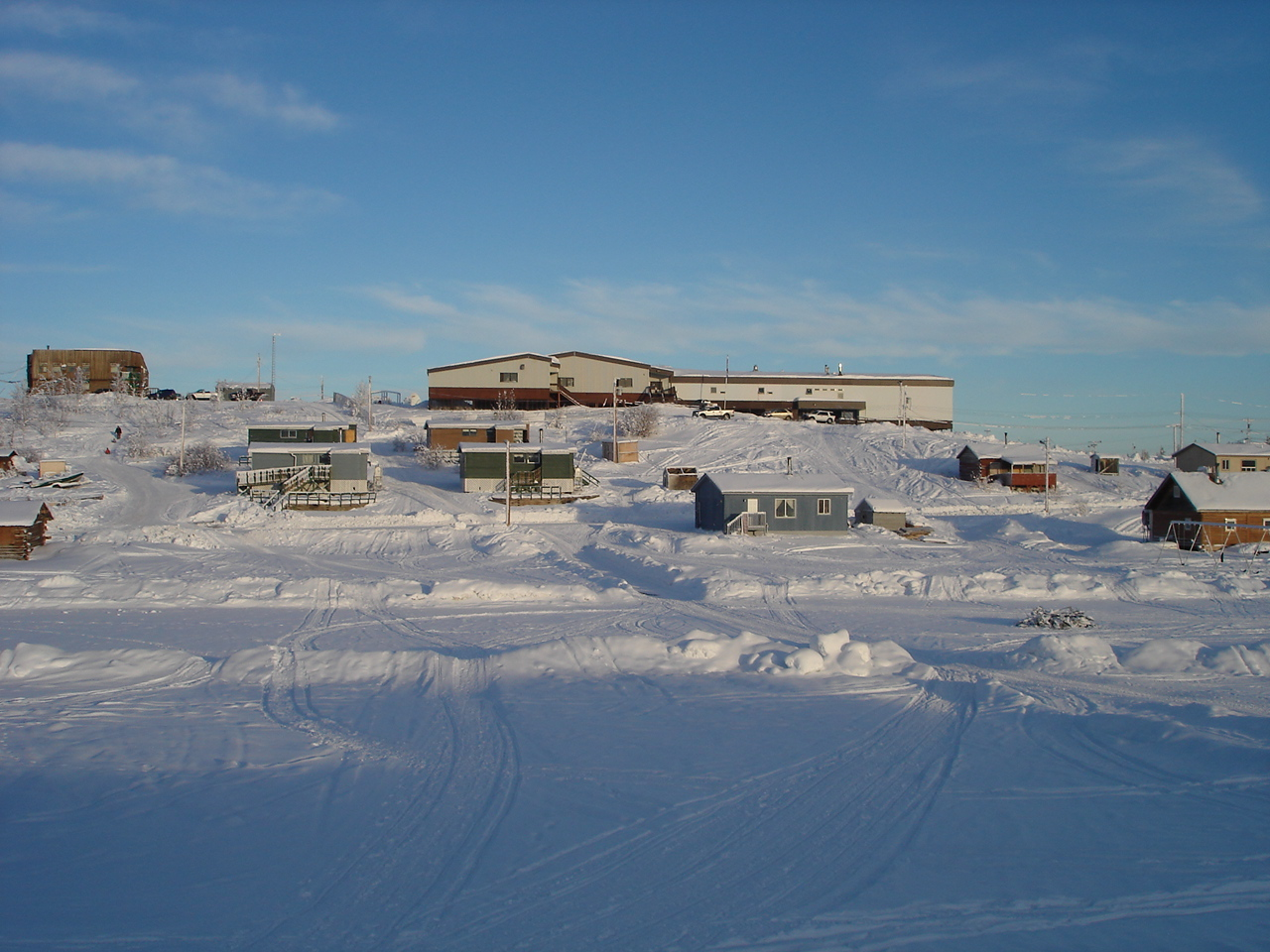
Fort Good Hope, with school (2006)

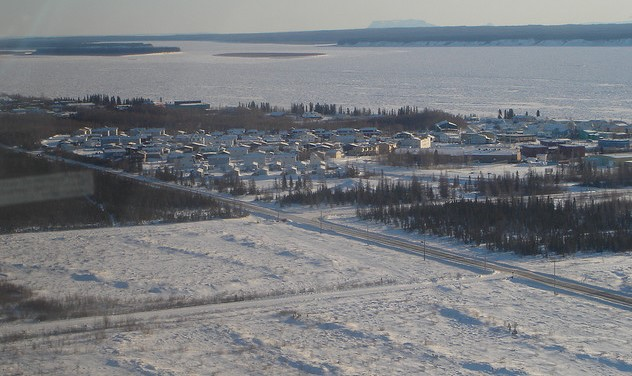
Norman Wells (2006)

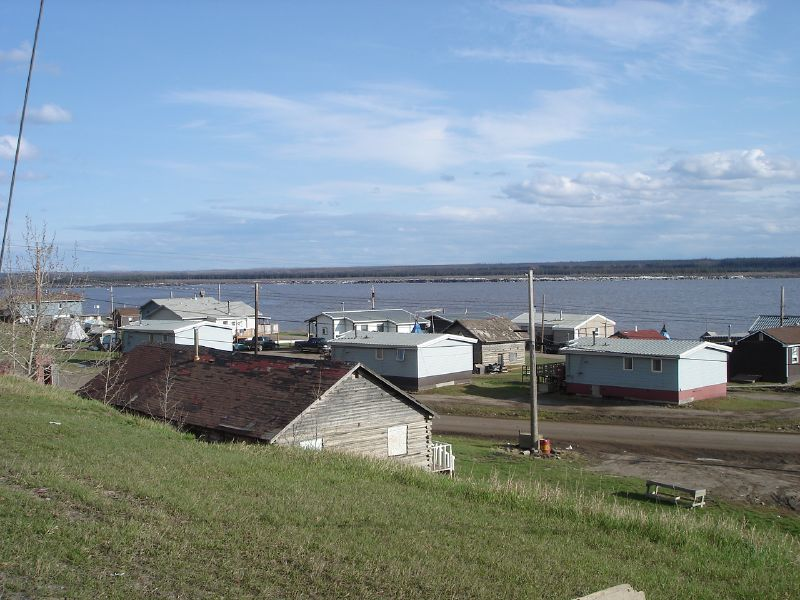
Tulita with the Mackenzie River in the background (2006)

== Climate ==
Climate data for Délı̨nę (Déline CS) WMO ID: 71503; coordinates 65°12′31″N 123°26′00″W; elevation: 212.8 m (698 ft); 1991–2020 normals. (Note: Composite data included from Déline Airport: Climate ID: 22010KA / 2201023; coordinates 65°12′40″N 123°26′11″W; elevation: 214.3 m (703 ft))
Month	Jan	Feb	Mar	Apr	May	Jun	Jul	Aug	Sep	Oct	Nov	Dec	Year
Record high humidex	11.1	5.0	14.3	16.2	24.4	30.8	33.3	32.6	25.4	20.1	3.8	4.0	33.3
Record high °C (°F)	4.0 (39.2)	5.1 (41.2)	14.7 (58.5)	16.3 (61.3)	24.8 (76.6)	30.2 (86.4)	31.4 (88.5)	32.0 (89.6)	24.0 (75.2)	20.8 (69.4)	4.8 (40.6)	5.6 (42.1)	32.0 (89.6)
Mean daily maximum °C (°F)	−20.6 (−5.1)	−17.9 (−0.2)	−12.8 (9.0)	−2.0 (28.4)	8.4 (47.1)	17.0 (62.6)	19.6 (67.3)	16.8 (62.2)	10.2 (50.4)	−0.3 (31.5)	−11.5 (11.3)	−18.2 (−0.8)	−0.9 (30.4)
Daily mean °C (°F)	−24.7 (−12.5)	−22.8 (−9.0)	−18.7 (−1.7)	−7.8 (18.0)	3.2 (37.8)	10.7 (51.3)	13.4 (56.1)	11.3 (52.3)	5.5 (41.9)	−3.4 (25.9)	−15.6 (3.9)	−22.3 (−8.1)	−5.9 (21.4)
Mean daily minimum °C (°F)	−28.8 (−19.8)	−27.6 (−17.7)	−24.5 (−12.1)	−13.8 (7.2)	−2.1 (28.2)	4.4 (39.9)	7.3 (45.1)	6.0 (42.8)	1.0 (33.8)	−6.5 (20.3)	−19.6 (−3.3)	−26.3 (−15.3)	−10.9 (12.4)
Record low °C (°F)	−49.1 (−56.4)	−45.9 (−50.6)	−44.1 (−47.4)	−35.0 (−31.0)	−23.3 (−9.9)	−6.9 (19.6)	−1.8 (28.8)	−4.9 (23.2)	−13.3 (8.1)	−29.7 (−21.5)	−37.4 (−35.3)	−43.6 (−46.5)	−49.1 (−56.4)
Record low wind chill	−55.9	−53.7	−53.7	−41.7	−30.9	−8.6	−3.2	−8.3	−15.8	−30.8	−44.0	−52.4	−55.9
Average precipitation mm (inches)	11.8 (0.46)	11.7 (0.46)	9.5 (0.37)	11.0 (0.43)	14.7 (0.58)	23.7 (0.93)	40.2 (1.58)	42.9 (1.69)	38.6 (1.52)	31.7 (1.25)	21.6 (0.85)	11.9 (0.47)	269.2 (10.60)
Average rainfall mm (inches)	0.0 (0.0)	0.0 (0.0)	0.0 (0.0)	0.2 (0.01)	12.7 (0.50)	23.5 (0.93)	39.9 (1.57)	—	38.5 (1.52)	—	0.3 (0.01)	0.0 (0.0)	—
Average snowfall cm (inches)	13.4 (5.3)	16.2 (6.4)	15.1 (5.9)	12.1 (4.8)	3.0 (1.2)	0.3 (0.1)	0.0 (0.0)	0.0 (0.0)	2.1 (0.8)	—	34.5 (13.6)	17.6 (6.9)	—
Average precipitation days (≥ 0.2 mm)	6.1	8.0	7.6	5.2	6.5	8.5	10.7	12.2	12.3	12.9	10.2	7.8	108.1
Average rainy days (≥ 0.2 mm)	0.0	0.0	0.0	0.3	4.9	8.1	10.5	—	12.0	—	0.1	0.0	—
Average snowy days (≥ 0.2 cm)	7.0	8.5	9.0	4.7	1.6	0.2	0.0	0.0	0.9	—	11.5	9.3	—
Average relative humidity (%) (at 1500 LST)	76.7	70.9	59.9	56.8	55.5	52.5	55.8	62.5	65.7	81.1	83.7	80.5	66.8
Source: Environment and Climate Change Canada

Climate data for Fort Good Hope (Fort Good Hope Airport) Climate ID: 2201400; coordinates 66°14′27″N 128°39′03″W; elevation: 81.4 m (267 ft); 1991–2020 normals, extremes 1907–present (Note: Composite data from Fort Good Hope Airport: Climate ID: 2201406; coordinates 66°14′26″N 128°39′51″W; elevation: 81.4 m (267 ft) and Fort Good Hope CS: WMO ID: 71491; coordinates 66°14′32″N 128°38′39″W; elevation: 81.7 m (268 ft)); 1991–2020 normals, extremes 1942–present
Month	Jan	Feb	Mar	Apr	May	Jun	Jul	Aug	Sep	Oct	Nov	Dec	Year
Record high humidex	4.6	1.8	16.1	21.8	30.4	36.0	38.3	35.8	25.0	22.7	4.1	5.1	38.3
Record high °C (°F)	6.7 (44.1)	5.6 (42.1)	16.2 (61.2)	21.8 (71.2)	30.5 (86.9)	35.0 (95.0)	37.4 (99.3)	33.9 (93.0)	28.3 (82.9)	22.1 (71.8)	9.7 (49.5)	5.3 (41.5)	37.4 (99.3)
Mean daily maximum °C (°F)	−22.7 (−8.9)	−19.1 (−2.4)	−12.8 (9.0)	0.1 (32.2)	11.7 (53.1)	21.3 (70.3)	22.6 (72.7)	19.0 (66.2)	10.6 (51.1)	−1.1 (30.0)	−14.2 (6.4)	−20.1 (−4.2)	−0.4 (31.3)
Daily mean °C (°F)	−26.5 (−15.7)	−23.8 (−10.8)	−19.1 (−2.4)	−6.5 (20.3)	5.7 (42.3)	15.3 (59.5)	16.9 (62.4)	13.3 (55.9)	5.8 (42.4)	−4.8 (23.4)	−18.1 (−0.6)	−23.9 (−11.0)	−5.5 (22.1)
Mean daily minimum °C (°F)	−30.6 (−23.1)	−28.5 (−19.3)	−25.4 (−13.7)	−13.4 (7.9)	−0.4 (31.3)	9.2 (48.6)	11.0 (51.8)	7.8 (46.0)	1.1 (34.0)	−8.4 (16.9)	−22.2 (−8.0)	−28.1 (−18.6)	−10.7 (12.7)
Record low °C (°F)	−56.2 (−69.2)	−56.2 (−69.2)	−48.3 (−54.9)	−40.0 (−40.0)	−25.0 (−13.0)	−3.3 (26.1)	−1.1 (30.0)	−5.6 (21.9)	−17.0 (1.4)	−38.0 (−36.4)	−47.2 (−53.0)	−52.2 (−62.0)	−56.2 (−69.2)
Record low wind chill	−54.6	−51.2	−49.7	−39.4	−24.0	0.0	0.0	−4.4	−15.5	−31.2	−43.4	−56.4	−56.4
Average precipitation mm (inches)	21.0 (0.83)	19.0 (0.75)	16.1 (0.63)	10.2 (0.40)	14.3 (0.56)	29.6 (1.17)	38.2 (1.50)	41.2 (1.62)	33.0 (1.30)	26.6 (1.05)	22.6 (0.89)	19.7 (0.78)	291.4 (11.47)
Average rainfall mm (inches)	0.0 (0.0)	0.0 (0.0)	0.0 (0.0)	—	7.3 (0.29)	29.2 (1.15)	—	38.8 (1.53)	27.7 (1.09)	—	0.0 (0.0)	0.0 (0.0)	—
Average snowfall cm (inches)	—	19.1 (7.5)	20.3 (8.0)	17.1 (6.7)	—	5.2 (2.0)	0.1 (0.0)	0.0 (0.0)	0.0 (0.0)	6.4 (2.5)	—	26.0 (10.2)	—
Average precipitation days (≥ 0.2 mm)	10.2	10.5	9.4	6.4	5.6	8.1	10.1	11.7	11.0	13.3	12.3	11.4	119.7
Average rainy days (≥ 0.2 mm)	0.0	0.0	0.0	—	2.8	7.1	—	10.2	9.0	—	0.0	0.0	—
Average snowy days (≥ 0.2 cm)	8.2	8.8	8.5	—	2.2	0.07	0.0	0.06	2.1	—	11.5	—	—
Average relative humidity (%) (at 1500 LST)	75.4	70.7	56.0	48.7	46.5	40.7	48.7	56.5	65.3	80.8	82.9	78.8	62.6
Source: Environment and Climate Change Canada (January minimum) (February minimum) (June maximum) (July maximum)

Climate data for Norman Wells (Norman Wells Airport) WMO ID: 71043; coordinates 65°16′53″N 126°47′55″W; elevation: 72.5 m (238 ft); 1991–2020 normals, extremes 1943–present
Month	Jan	Feb	Mar	Apr	May	Jun	Jul	Aug	Sep	Oct	Nov	Dec	Year
Record high humidex	12.2	6.3	17.5	20.0	29.7	36.2	37.2	36.0	29.7	19.8	12.2	10.7	37.2
Record high °C (°F)	12.5 (54.5)	7.9 (46.2)	17.8 (64.0)	20.0 (68.0)	31.3 (88.3)	33.5 (92.3)	37.9 (100.2)	34.8 (94.6)	28.7 (83.7)	21.0 (69.8)	13.3 (55.9)	11.1 (52.0)	37.9 (100.2)
Mean daily maximum °C (°F)	−21.4 (−6.5)	−18.0 (−0.4)	−12.0 (10.4)	0.9 (33.6)	13.0 (55.4)	21.0 (69.8)	22.6 (72.7)	19.1 (66.4)	11.3 (52.3)	−0.5 (31.1)	−13.6 (7.5)	−19.6 (−3.3)	0.2 (32.4)
Daily mean °C (°F)	−25.4 (−13.7)	−22.8 (−9.0)	−18.2 (−0.8)	−5.3 (22.5)	6.9 (44.4)	15.0 (59.0)	16.8 (62.2)	13.7 (56.7)	6.5 (43.7)	−3.9 (25.0)	−17.4 (0.7)	−23.6 (−10.5)	−4.8 (23.4)
Mean daily minimum °C (°F)	−29.4 (−20.9)	−27.5 (−17.5)	−24.3 (−11.7)	−11.5 (11.3)	0.8 (33.4)	8.8 (47.8)	10.9 (51.6)	8.2 (46.8)	1.5 (34.7)	−7.2 (19.0)	−21.2 (−6.2)	−27.5 (−17.5)	−9.9 (14.2)
Record low °C (°F)	−52.2 (−62.0)	−54.4 (−65.9)	−46.1 (−51.0)	−37.2 (−35.0)	−17.8 (0.0)	−4.3 (24.3)	−1.1 (30.0)	−6.1 (21.0)	−15.7 (3.7)	−31.7 (−25.1)	−42.8 (−45.0)	−47.8 (−54.0)	−54.4 (−65.9)
Record low wind chill	−61.7	−60.2	−57.5	−43.8	−25.1	−6.9	−2.2	−9.6	−17.7	−39.9	−52.4	−62.4	−62.4
Average precipitation mm (inches)	18.0 (0.71)	17.2 (0.68)	11.3 (0.44)	11.1 (0.44)	20.5 (0.81)	35.8 (1.41)	49.0 (1.93)	52.5 (2.07)	33.9 (1.33)	23.5 (0.93)	27.2 (1.07)	21.6 (0.85)	321.6 (12.66)
Average rainfall mm (inches)	0.2 (0.01)	0.0 (0.0)	0.4 (0.02)	1.3 (0.05)	11.6 (0.46)	35.7 (1.41)	46.4 (1.83)	49.1 (1.93)	23.9 (0.94)	3.3 (0.13)	0.1 (0.00)	0.0 (0.0)	171.9 (6.77)
Average snowfall cm (inches)	22.7 (8.9)	21.7 (8.5)	15.8 (6.2)	14.2 (5.6)	7.5 (3.0)	0.4 (0.2)	0.0 (0.0)	0.1 (0.0)	6.4 (2.5)	24.8 (9.8)	27.5 (10.8)	24.8 (9.8)	165.8 (65.3)
Average precipitation days (≥ 0.2 mm)	12.8	11.9	10.9	7.4	8.3	10.7	13.5	14.8	13.4	14.2	15.4	14.1	147.3
Average rainy days (≥ 0.2 mm)	0.17	0.04	0.21	0.92	4.8	9.6	12.0	12.1	9.9	2.5	0.22	0.0	52.4
Average snowy days (≥ 0.2 cm)	11.8	11.3	10.5	6.7	3.1	0.16	0.0	0.08	3.3	12.4	13.6	12.4	85.3
Average relative humidity (%) (at 1500 LST)	67.1	62.5	53.0	50.8	45.2	44.2	50.2	56.2	61.5	75.3	75.0	69.6	59.2
Source: Environment and Climate Change Canada (1991-2020 climate normals) (July Maximum temperature)
