= List of communities in the Northwest Territories =

The Northwest Territories of Canada contains 33 official communities according to the Government of the Northwest Territories.

== Communities ==
The following are communities recognised by the Government of the Northwest Territories. All of them are also recognised as census subdivisions by Statistics Canada.

Official name, traditional name	Former name, date of change	Translation	Governance (Note: Governance types are from Municipal Affairs and Community Administration and Statistics Canada. Entries in parentheses are from Statistics Canada only.)	Municipality	Administrative region	Census division	2021 Canadian census			Coordinates
Official name, traditional name	Former name, date of change	Translation	Governance	Municipality	Administrative region	Census division	Population (2021)	Population (2016)	% change	Coordinates
Aklavik; Akłarvik		barren-ground grizzly place	Hamlet	Yes	Inuvik	Region 1	536	590	−9.2%	68°13′10″N 135°00′29″W
Behchokǫ̀	Rae Edzo; August 4, 2005	Mbehcho's place	Self government	Yes	North Slave	Region 3	1,746	1,874	−6.8%	62°49′38″N 116°03′30″W
Colville Lake; K'áhbamı̨́túé		ptarmigan net place	Designated Authority (Settlement)	No	Sahtu	Region 2	110	129	−14.7%	67°02′24″N 126°05′28″W
Délı̨nę	Fort Franklin; June 1, 1993	where the waters flow	Self Government (Charter Community)	Yes	Sahtu	Region 2	573	533	7.5%	65°11′20″N 123°25′21″W
Dettah; T'èɂehda		burnt point	Designated Authority (Settlement)	No	North Slave	Region 6	192	219	-12.3%	62°24′40″N 114°18′30″W
Enterprise			Hamlet	Yes	South Slave	Region 5	75	106	-29.2%	60°33′17″N 116°08′50″W
Fort Good Hope; Rádeyı̨lı̨kóé	Fort Hope unknown	rapids place	Charter Community	Yes	Sahtu	Region 2	507	516	-1.7%	66°15′25″N 128°38′16″W
Fort Liard; Echaot'ı̨e Kų́ę́		people from the land of the giants	Hamlet	Yes	Dehcho	Region 4	468	500	−6.4%	60°14′21″N 123°28′31″W
Fort McPherson; Teetł'it Zheh		at the head of the waters place	Hamlet	Yes	Inuvik	Region 1	647	700	−7.6%	67°26′07″N 134°52′57″W
Fort Providence; Zhahti Kų́ę́		mission house	Hamlet	Yes	South Slave	Region 4	618	695	−11.1%	61°21′19″N 117°39′15″W
Fort Resolution; Denı́nu Kų́ę́		moose island	Hamlet	Yes	South Slave	Region 5	412	470	−12.3%	61°10′16″N 113°40′19″W
Fort Simpson; Łı́ı́dlı̨ Kų́ę́		place where rivers come together	Village	Yes	Dehcho	Region 4	1,100	1,202	-8.5%	61°51′39″N 121°21′10″W
Fort Smith; Tthebacha		beside the rapids	Town	Yes	South Slave	Region 5	2,248	2,542	-11.6%	60°00′19″N 111°52′58″W
Gamèti; Gahmı̨̀tı̀	Rae Lakes; August 4, 2005	rabbit net place	Self Government (Community Government)	Yes	North Slave	Region 3	252	278	-9.4%	64°06′46″N 117°21′09″W
Hay River; Xátł'odehchee		for the Hay River	Town	Yes	South Slave	Region 5	3,169	3,528	−10.2%	60°48′35″N 115°47′23″W
Inuvik; Inuuvik		place of man	Town	Yes	Inuvik	Region 1	3,137	3,243	−3.3%	68°21′39″N 133°43′47″W
Jean Marie River; Tthek'éhdélı̨		water flowing over clay	Designated Authority(Settlement)	No	Dehcho	Region 4	63	77	-18.2%	61°31′30″N 120°37′40″W
Kakisa; K'ágee		between the willows	Designated Authority (Settlement)	No	South Slave	Region 4	39	36	8.3%	60°56′27″N 117°24′57″W
Kátł’odeeche; Hay River Reserve; Hay River Dene 1 Xátł'odehchee		for the Hay River	Designated Authority (Indian reserve)	No	South Slave	Region 4	259	309	-16.2%	60°50′01″N 115°45′57″W (Note: Original site was at 60°51′32″N 115°43′33″W and the Hay River Dene 1 is centred at 60°48′00″N 115°44′05″W)
Łutselk'e; Łútsę̀lk'é	Snowdrift; July 1, 1992	place of the Łutsel fish, a cisco	Designated Authority (Settlement)	No	North Slave	Region 5	333	303	9.9%	62°24′15″N 110°44′18″W
Nahanni Butte; Tthenáágó		strong rock	Designated Authority(Settlement)	No	Dehcho	Region 4	81	87	−6.9%	61°02′08″N 123°23′00″W
Norman Wells; Tłegǫ́htı̨		where there is oil	Town	Yes	Sahtu	Region 2	673	778	-13.5%	65°16′52″N 126°49′54″W
Paulatuk; Paulatuuq		place of coal	Hamlet	Yes	Inuvik	Region 1	298	265	12.5%	69°21′01″N 124°04′08″W
Sachs Harbour; Ikaahuk		place to which you cross	Hamlet	Yes	Inuvik	Region 1	104	103	1.0%	71°59′12″N 125°15′02″W
Sambaa K'e	Trout Lake; June 21, 2016	Place of trout	Designated Authority (Settlement)	No	Dehcho	Region 4	97	88	10.2%	60°26′33″N 121°14′43″W
Tsiigehtchic; Tsiigehtshik	Arctic Red River; April 1, 1994	mouth of the iron river Arctic Red River	Hamlet	Yes	Inuvik	Region 1	138	172	-19.8%	67°26′33″N 133°44′33″W
Tuktoyaktuk; Tuktuujaqrtuuq	Port Brabant; 1950	looks like a caribou	Hamlet	Yes	Inuvik	Region 1	937	898	4.3%	69°27′03″N 133°02′09″W
Tulita; Tulı́t’a	Fort Norman; January 1, 1996	where the waters meet	Hamlet	Yes	Sahtu	Region 2	396	477	−17.0%	64°54′02″N 125°34′35″W
Ulukhaktok; Ulukhaqtuuq	Holman; April 1, 2006	where there is material for ulus	Hamlet	Yes	Inuvik	Region 1	408	396	3.0%	70°44′12″N 117°46′19″W
Wekweètì	Snare Lakes; November 1, 1998	rock lake	Self Government (Community Government)	Yes	North Slave	Region 3	109	129	−15.5%	64°11′21″N 114°11′10″W
Whatì	Lac La Martre; January 1, 1996	marten lake	Self Government (Community Government)	Yes	North Slave	Region 3	543	470	15.5%	63°08′42″N 117°16′27″W
Wrigley; Pedzéh Kı̨́		clay place	Designated Authority (Settlement)	No	Dehcho	Region 4	117	119	−1.7%	63°13′36″N 123°28′00″W
Yellowknife; Sǫ̀mbak'è		money place	City	Yes	North Slave	Region 6	20,340	19,569	3.9%	62°27′13″N 114°22′12″W

=== Other ===
Ndilǫ, ("end of the island", formerly Rainbow Valley, until 1991) part of the Akaitcho Territory Government, and represented by the Yellowknives Dene First Nation. It is located at 62°28′26″N 114°20′22″W on Latham Island, Yellowknife.

== Other census subdivisions ==
Name	Governance (Note: Governance types are from Statistics Canada.)	Municipality	Administrative region	Census division	2021 Canadian census			Coordinates (Note: Centred on largest community)
Name	Governance	Municipality	Administrative region	Census division	Population (2021)	Population (2016)	% change	Coordinates
Region 1, Unorganized		No		Region 1	0	5	-100.0%	68°21′39″N 133°43′47″W (Note: Region 1 centred on Inuvik)
Region 2, Unorganized		No		Region 2	0	0	-	65°16′52″N 126°49′54″W (Note: Region 2 centred on Norman Wells)
Region 3, Unorganized		No		Region 3	0	0	-	62°49′38″N 116°03′30″W (Note: Region 3 centred on Behchokǫ̀)
Region 4, Unorganized		No		Region 4	30	47	-36.2%	61°51′39″N 121°21′10″W (Note: Region 4 centred on Fort Simpson)
Region 5, Unorganized		No		Region 5	37	31	19.4%	60°48′35″N 115°47′23″W (Note: Region 5 centred on Hay River)
Region 6, Unorganized		No		Region 6	273	302	-9.6%	62°27′13″N 114°22′12″W (Note: Region 6 centred on Yellowknife)
Reliance	Settlement	No	South Slave	Region 5	0	0	-	62°42′46″N 109°09′53″W
Salt Plains 195	Indian reserve	No	South Slave	Region 5	5	0	-	60°06′21″N 112°14′34″W

== Other places ==
- Canol Camp
- Discovery
- Fort Confidence
- Old Fort Providence
- Pine Point
- Port Radium
- Rayrock
- Tungsten
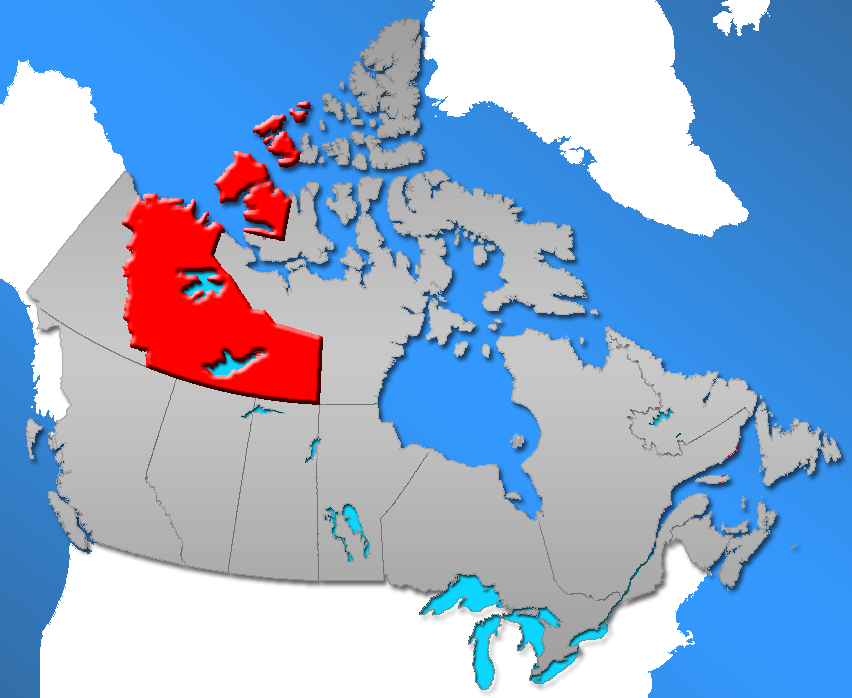
Communities in Canada's provinces and territories

== Regional populations ==
Regional populations (Census division)
Name	# of communities	2021 Canadian census			Area		Coordinates
Name	# of communities	Population (2021)	Population (2016)	% change	km^{2}	sqmi	Coordinates
Region 1	8	6,205	6,372	-2.6%	357,015.13	137,844.31	68°21′39″N 133°43′47″W
Region 2	5	2,259	2,433	-7.2%	218,296.94	84,284.92	65°16′52″N 126°49′54″W
Region 3	4	2,650	2,751	-3.7%	24,796.95	9,574.16	62°49′38″N 116°03′30″W
Region 4	9	2,872	3,160	-9.1%	193,265.47	74,620.22	61°51′39″N 121°21′10″W
Region 5	7	6,279	6,980	-10.2%	152,135.92	58,740.01	60°48′35″N 115°47′23″W
Region 6	2	20,805	20,090	3.6%	182,201.50	70,348.39	62°27′13″N 114°22′12″W

Regional populations (Administrative regions)
Name	Regional office	# of communities	2021 Canadian census			Coordinates (Note: Centred on regional office)
Name	Regional office	# of communities	Population (2021)	Population (2016)	% change	Coordinates
Dehcho Region	Fort Simpson	6	1,926	2,073	-7.1%	61°51′39″N 121°21′10″W
Inuvik Region	Inuvik	8	6,205	6,367	-2.5%	68°21′39″N 133°43′47″W
North Slave Region	Yellowknife	7	23,515	22,842	2.9%	62°27′13″N 114°22′12″W
Sahtu Region	Norman Wells	5	2,259	2,433	-7.2%	65°16′52″N 126°49′54″W
South Slave Region	Fort Smith	7	6,825	7,686	-11.2%	60°00′19″N 111°52′58″W

== See also ==
- List of cities in Canada
- List of municipalities in the Northwest Territories
