= Regions of the Northwest Territories =

- Administrative regions of the Northwest Territories with regional offices
- Category: Territory
- Location: Northwest Territories
- Number: 5
- Populations: (2021) 1,926 (Dehcho Region) — 23,515 (North Slave Region)
- Government: Administrative region
- Subdivisions: Municipalities

The Canadian territory of the Northwest Territories is subdivided into administrative regions in different ways for various purposes.

== Administrative regions ==
The Northwest Territories Department of Municipal and Community Affairs divides the territory into five regions. Other services have adopted similar divisions for administrative purposes, making these the de facto regions of the territory. These divisions have no government of their own, but the Northwest Territories' government services are decentralized on a regional basis.

Some government departments make slight changes to this arrangement. For example, the Health and Social Services Authority groups Fort Resolution with the North Slave Region, and divides South Slave Region into two regions: Hay River and Fort Smith. The Department of Natural Resources uses the same borders, but calls the Inuvik Region "Beaufort Delta".

Map	Region		Demographics (2021 Census)					
Map	Region		Population		Indigenous population profile			
Map	Name	Regional office(s)	Total	Change (from 2016)	First Nations	Métis	Inuit	Other
	Dehcho Region	Fort Simpson	1,926	−7.6%	1,375	95	40	510
	Inuvik Region	Inuvik	6,205	−1.9%	1,800	185	3,470	2,065
	North Slave Region	Yellowknife; Behchokǫ̀ (sub-office)	23,515	+2.86%	6,125	1,050	785	17,455
	Sahtu Region	Norman Wells	2,259	−7.7%	1,530	145	50	490
	South Slave Region	Fort Smith; Hay River (sub-office)	6,820	-12.7%	3,000	1,045	300	3,820

== Indigenous governance regions ==
Land and self-government treaties with First Nations, Inuvialuit (Inuit), and Métis groups recognise a significant amount of authority for their governments to manage land use within agreed-upon areas. These areas are each much larger than the area fully owned by the indigenous government. Within each of these areas, the indigenous nation has jurisdiction over several areas of law, and land use is effectively co-governed by the territorial government and indigenous government.

A treaty also exists with the Salt River First Nation, but it establishes reserves rather than a joint land use area.

Jurisdictional area	Indigenous government	Notes	Map
Délįnę District	Délı̨nę Got’ı̨nę Government	In the Sahtu Settlement Region, which had land claims settled in the 1993 Sahtu Dene and Metis Comprehensive Land Claim Agreement. Self-government was recognized by the 2014 Délįnę Final Self-government Agreement. The government took over responsibilities of both the Délı̨nę First Nation and the Délı̨nę community government.	
Katlʼodeeche Gotʼi Ndee	Kʼatlodeeche First Nation	Organized in reserves under the Indian Act. South of Great Slave Lake. Its western boundary is approximately 50 km (31 mi) west of the Mackenzie Highway (NWT Highway 1), and its eastern boundary is approximately halfway through Wood Buffalo National Park. Its claimed land slightly overlaps in the west with claims by the Kaʼaʼgee Tu Band of the Dehcho First Nations. Half of its population lives in Hay River Reserve.	
Tłegǫ́hłı̨ Administrative Area	Tłegǫ́hłı̨ Got’įnę Government	Land claims were settled in the 1993 as part of the Sahtu Dene and Metis Comprehensive Land Claim Agreement. Self-government was recognized in the 2026 Final Self-Government Agreement for the Tłegǫ́hłı̨ Got’įnę. Contains Norman Wells, which will maintain its own municipal government with an option to merge into the Tłegǫ́hłı̨ Got’įnę Government.	
Tłı̨chǫ Ndé	Tłı̨chǫ Government	Land claims and self-government were both settled in the 2003 Tłįchǫ Land Claims and Self-government Agreement. Comprises the western half of North Slave Region, excluding the city of Yellowknife. Lands directly owned by the Tłįchǫ government are one continuous block in the centre of the region. The region is also called Wekʼèezhìı for the purpose of the water board.	

=== Self-government agreements in negotiation ===
Jurisdictional area	Indigenous government	Notes	Map
Acho Dene Koe Territory	Acho Dene Koe First Nation	Land claimed includes land in the NWT, Yukon, and British Columbia. The NWT portion is in the southwest of the province, surrounding the hamlet of Fort Liard. A land claim agreement-in-principle was signed 5 February 2014. Discussions for a self-government agreement are in early stages.	
Akaitcho Territory	Akaitcho Territory Government	North Slave Region east of Wekʼèezhìı and the eastern half of South Slave Region. The southern part of the region is in Treaty 8 territory, and the northern part is known as Chief Drygeese Territory. North Slave Métis Alliance also has claim to the area. The eastern portion of the land overlaps with claims by the Ghotelnene K’odtineh Dene. A comprehensive agreement is in discussion as of 2021	
Colville Lake District	Behdzi Ahda' First Nation	In the Sahtu Settlement Region, which had land claims settled in the 1993 Sahtu Dene and Metis Comprehensive Land Claim Agreement. Part of the K'ahsho Got'ine District of that region, along with the Fort Good Hope District. A self-government treaty is in negotiation.	
Dehcho Region	Dehcho First Nations	Lands claimed approximate the Dehcho Region, although the Ka'a'gee Tu Band claims land farther east. The claim overlaps the Acho Dene Koe Territory in the southwest and overlaps with Katlʼodeeche Gotʼi Ndee in the east. A self-government treaty is in negotiation as of 2021	
Fort Good Hope District	K’ahsho Got’ine Community Council (Fort Good Hope First Nation)	In the Sahtu Settlement Region, which had land claims settled in the 1993 Sahtu Dene and Metis Comprehensive Land Claim Agreement. Part of the K'ahsho Got'ine District of that region, along with the Colville Lake District. A self-government treaty is in negotiation.	
Gwichʼin Settlement Area	Gwich'in Tribal Council Nihtat Gwichʼin (Inuvik)	Land claims were settled in the 1992 Gwichʼin Comprehensive Land Claim Agreement. The communities of Aklavik and Inuvik fall under both this region and the Inuvialuit Settlement Region. Overlaps with land claimed by First Nation of Na-Cho Nyak Dun, which is based in Yukon. A self-government agreement is being negotiated by the Gwichʼin Tribal Council for all of Gwichʼin except the Nihtat Gwichʼin in Inuvik, which is negotiating its own agreement.	
Inuvialuit Settlement Region	Inuvialuit Regional Corporation	Land claims were settled in the 1984 Inuvialuit Final Agreement. Area covered by the agreement extends into Yukon. It borders the Gwichʼin Settlement Area and the communities of Aklavik and Inuvik fall under both land claims. A self-government agreement is in negotiation.	
South Slave Metis Region	NWT Metis Nation	Located in the South Slave Region, with current Metis councils based in Hay River, Fort Smith, and Fort Resolution. It claims two cabin sites that overlap with land claims made by Kʼatlodeeche First Nation. An agreement-in-principle has been signed for land claims. A self-government agreement is in early stages of negotiation.	
Tulita District	Yamoria Community Secretariat / Tulita Dene First Nation	In the Sahtu Settlement Region, which had land claims settled in the 1993 Sahtu Dene and Metis Comprehensive Land Claim Agreement. Part of the Tulita District of that region, along with the Tłegǫ́hłı̨ Administrative Area. A self-government treaty is in negotiation.	

== Census divisions ==
Statistics Canada divides the territory into six census divisions. These areas exist solely for the purposes of statistical analysis and presentation; they have no government of their own. They are listed below with their most populous municipality on the right:

- Region 1 – Inuvik
- Region 2 – Norman Wells
- Region 3 – Behchokǫ̀
- Region 4 – Fort Simpson
- Region 5 – Fort Smith
- Region 6 – Yellowknife

=== Former census divisions ===
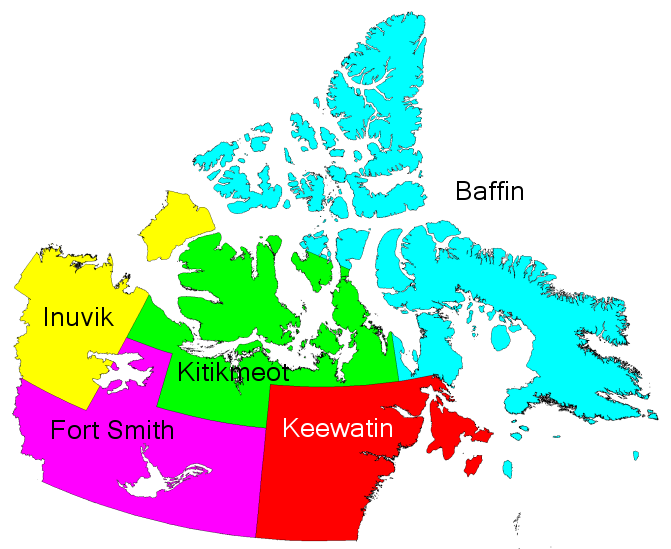
Administrative regions prior to 1999

==== 1999-2011 ====
Prior to the 2011 census, there were two census divisions. The former census division of Inuvik was considerably larger than the administrative region of the same name.

- Fort Smith Region – Fort Smith
- Inuvik Region – Inuvik

==== Before 1999 ====
Prior to the division of the NWT and the creation of Nunavut in 1999, there were five census divisions. Their boundaries were altered somewhat as part of the adjustment.

- Baffin Region
- Fort Smith Region
- Inuvik Region
- Keewatin Region
- Kitikmeot Region

== See also ==
- List of regions of Nunavut
