= List of Canadian census divisions with Indigenous majority populations =

This is a list of Canadian census divisions in which a majority (over 50%) of the population is Indigenous Canadian (First Nations, Inuit or Métis), according to data from the 2021 Census. There are 16 census divisions in seven provinces and territories with Indigenous majority populations.

== List ==
Province or Territory	Census division	Population 2021 (who answered the Indigenous identity census question)	Indigenous population	Indigenous percent
Northwest Territories	Region 3	2,635	2,470	93.74%
Newfoundland and Labrador	Division No. 11	2,320	2,170	93.53%
Manitoba	Division No. 19	15,235	14,160	92.94%
Nunavut	Kivalliq	10,980	10,175	92.67%
Nunavut	Kitikmeot	6,405	5,800	90.55%
Northwest Territories	Region 4	2,845	2,490	87.52%
Saskatchewan	Division No. 18	35,830	30,890	86.21%
Manitoba	Division No. 22	41,975	34,280	81.67%
Nunavut	Qikiqtaaluk	19,220	15,415	80.20%
Manitoba	Division No. 23	4,660	3,665	78.65%
Northwest Territories	Region 1	6,100	4,795	78.61%
Northwest Territories	Region 2	2,250	1,760	78.22%
Quebec	Nord-du-Québec	45,475	31,170	68.54%
British Columbia	Central Coast	3,555	2,370	66.67%
Northwest Territories	Region 5	6,175	3,445	55.79%
Manitoba	Division No. 21	21420	11,705	54.65%

== Census divisions with Indigenous Canadian plurality ==
In addition here is a list of census divisions in which Indigenous Canadians are the plurality (the largest ethnicity, more numerous than White Canadians):

Province or Territory	Census division	Population 2021 (who answered the Indigenous identity census question)	Indigenous population	Indigenous percent
Ontario	Kenora	65,040	32,355	49.75%

== See also ==
- Indigenous peoples in Canada
