= Census division statistics of Canada =

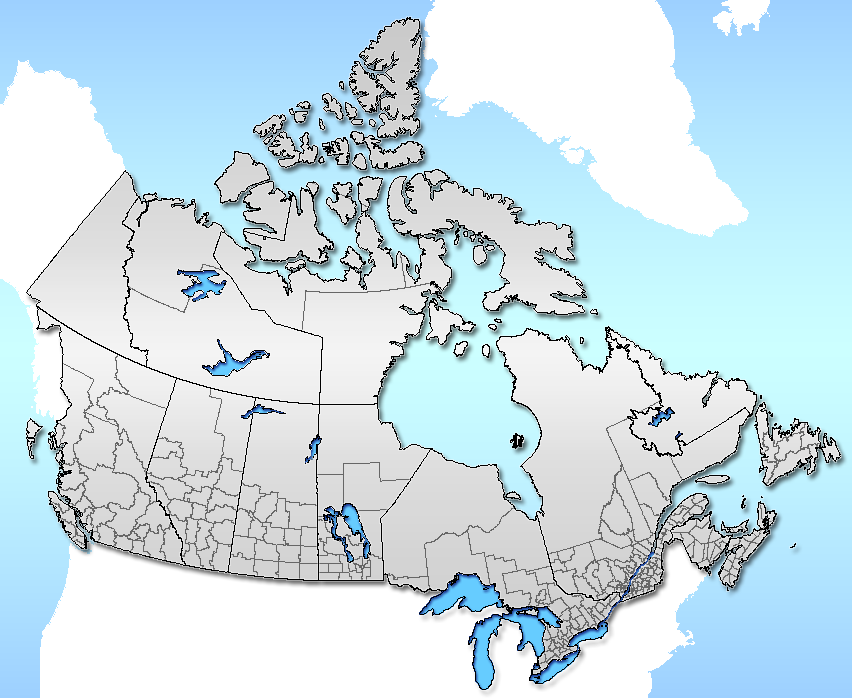
Census divisions by province

In some Canadian provinces, census divisions are equivalent to counties. They may also be referred to by different names, depending on the provinces or regions. The table below shows the largest and smallest census division in Canada—and in each province and territory—by both area and population.

== By area ==
	Smallest (km^{2})	Largest (km^{2})
Canada	L'Île-d'Orléans, Quebec (192.81)	Baffin Region, Nunavut (989,889.18)
Alberta	Division No. 8 (9,908.36)	Division No. 17 (192,115.90)
British Columbia	Regional District of Nanaimo (2,038.01)	Stikine Region (118,663.10)
Manitoba	Division No. 11 (571.06)	Division No. 23 (242,363.77)
New Brunswick	Saint John County (1,464.53)	Northumberland County (12,932.70)
Newfoundland and Labrador	Division No. 2 (6,098.60)	Division No. 10 (199,703.35)
Northwest Territories	Region 3 (25,080.94)	Region 1 (365,094.37)
Nova Scotia	Richmond County (1,244.24)	Halifax Regional Municipality (5,495.71)
Nunavut	Keewatin Region (444,621.10)	Baffin Region (989,889.18)
Ontario	Toronto Division (630.21)	Kenora District (407,213.01)
Prince Edward Island	Kings County (1,685.80)	Queens County (2,020.45)
Quebec	L'Île-d'Orléans (192.81)	Nord-du-Québec (747,161.22)
Saskatchewan	Division No. 10 (12,223.73)	Division No. 18 (269,996.55)
Yukon	Yukon (474,712.64)	

== By population ==
	Smallest	Largest
Canada	Stikine Region, British Columbia (629)	Toronto Division, Ontario (2,615,060)
Alberta	Division No. 4 (10,078)	Division No. 6 (Calgary) (1,311,022)
British Columbia	Stikine Region (629)	Greater Vancouver Regional District (2,313,328)
Manitoba	Division No. 23 (8,590)	Division No. 11 (666,832)
New Brunswick	Queens County (11,086)	Westmorland County (144,158)
Newfoundland and Labrador	Division No. 11 (2,617)	Division 1 (262,410)
Northwest Territories	Region 2 (2,341)	Region 6 (19,444)
Nova Scotia	Victoria County (7,115)	Halifax Regional Municipality (390,328)
Nunavut	Kitikmeot Region (6,012)	Baffin Region (16,939)
Ontario	Manitoulin District (13,048)	Toronto Division (2,615,060)
Prince Edward Island	Kings County (17,990)	Queens County (77,866)
Quebec	L'Île-d'Orléans (6,711)	Montreal (1,886,481)
Saskatchewan	Division No. 4 (10,879)	Division No. 11 (271,170)
Yukon	Yukon (33,897)	

== 10 fastest growing population (2006–2011) ==
1. Division No. 16, Alberta 27.2%
2. La Jacques-Cartier RCM, Quebec 24.0%
3. Mirabel RCM, Quebec 21.2%
4. Division No. 2, Manitoba 17.0%
5. Les Moulins RCM, Quebec 15.8%
6. York RM, Ontario 15.7%
7. Vaudreuil-Soulanges RCM, Quebec 15.7%
8. Division No. 3, Manitoba 14.4%
9. Halton RM, Ontario 14.2%
10. Les Moulins RCM, Quebec 13.8%

== 10 fastest shrinking population (2006–2011) ==
1. Kenora, Ontario −10.6%
2. Guysborough County, Nova Scotia −10.1%
3. Northern Rockies Regional Municipality, British Columbia −9.3%
4. Division No. 3, Newfoundland and Labrador −7.8%
5. Division No. 9, Newfoundland and Labrador −7.2%
6. Shelburne, Nova Scotia −6.7%
7. Victoria County, Nova Scotia −6.3%
8. La Haute-Côte-Nord RCM, Quebec −6.2%
9. Inverness, Nova Scotia −5.7%
10. Témiscouata RCM, Quebec −5.6%
