= Fort Smith Region, Northwest Territories =

Coordinates: 62°27′N 114°24′W

Fort Smith Region census division

Fort Smith Region was a former Statistics Canada census division, one of two in the Northwest Territories, Canada. It was abolished in the 2011 census, along with the other census division of Inuvik Region, and the land area of the Northwest Territories was divided into new census divisions named Region 1, Region 2, Region 3, Region 4, Region 5, Region 6.

Its former territory covered all of the modern-day Regions 3 through 6, as well as a part of Region 2. For example, its border with the old Inuvik Region ran through the middle of Great Bear Lake, which is now entirely within the modern-day Region 2.

It contained more than 77 percent of the population and more than 54 percent of the land area of the Northwest Territories. Its main economic centre was the territorial capital of Yellowknife; it also contained the town of Fort Smith. The 2006 census reported a population of 32,272 spread over a land area of 618,619.7 square kilometres (238,850.4 sq mi).

== Communities ==
- City
  - Yellowknife
- Towns
  - Fort Smith
  - Hay River
- Village
  - Fort Simpson
- Hamlets
  - Fort Liard
  - Fort Providence
  - Behchokǫ̀
  - Whatì
- Settlements
  - Dettah
  - Enterprise
  - Fort Resolution
  - Jean Marie River
  - Kakisa
  - Łutselk'e
  - Nahanni Butte
  - Gamèti
  - Fort Reliance
  - Trout Lake
  - Wekweeti
  - Wrigley
- Indian reserves
  - Hay River Reserve (Hay River Dene)
  - Salt River First Nation
