= Region 4, Northwest Territories =

Coordinates: 61.3547°N 117.6600°W

Region 4 is the name of a Statistics Canada census division, one of six in the Northwest Territories, Canada. It was introduced in the 2011 census, along with Regions 1, 2, 3, 5, and 6, resulting in the abolition of the former census divisions of Fort Smith Region and Inuvik Region (the latter not to be confused with the modern-day administrative region of the same name). Unlike in some other provinces, census divisions do not reflect the organization of local government in the Northwest Territories. These areas exist solely for the purposes of statistical analysis and presentation; they have no government of their own.

Its territory coincides roughly with the Dehcho Region and the extreme western part of South Slave Region that is centred on Fort Providence, west of Great Slave Lake.

The 2011 census reported a population of 3,246 and a land area of 194,494.08 km^{2} (75,094.58 sq mi).

Main languages in the Region include English (62.8%), Slavey (33.6%) and Dene (1.7%).

== Demographics ==
In the 2021 Census of Population conducted by Statistics Canada, Region 4 of the Northwest Territories had a population of 2,872 living in 1,152 of its 1,474 total private dwellings, a change of -9.1% from its 2016 population of 3,160. With a land area of 193,265.47 km^{2} (74,620.22 sq mi), it had a population density of 0.0/km^{2} (0.0/sq mi) in 2021.

== Communities ==
- Village
  - Fort Simpson
- Hamlets
  - Fort Liard
  - Fort Providence
- Settlements
  - Jean Marie River
  - Kakisa
  - Nahanni Butte
  - Trout Lake
  - Wrigley
- Indian reserve
  - Hay River Reserve (Hay River Dene)
