= Standard Geographical Classification code (Canada) =

The Standard Geographical Classification (SGC) is a system maintained by Statistics Canada for categorizing and enumerating the census geographic units of Canada. Each geographic area receives a unique numeric code ranging from one to seven digits, which extend telescopically to refer to increasingly small areas. This geocode is roughly analogous to the ONS coding system in use in the United Kingdom.

== Regions ==
The SGC code format for regions is X, where X is a unique identifier incrementing from east to west, then north.

1: Atlantic Canada
2: Quebec
3: Ontario
4: Prairies
5: British Columbia
6: Northern Canada

== Provinces and Territories ==
The SGC code format for provinces and territories is XY, where X is the above regional prefix, and Y is a further identifier incrementing from east to west. Taken as a single digit, each value of Y is unique within the province group, or unique within the territory group.

10: Newfoundland and Labrador
11: Prince Edward Island
12: Nova Scotia
13: New Brunswick
24: Quebec
35: Ontario
46: Manitoba
47: Saskatchewan
48: Alberta
59: British Columbia
60: Yukon
61: Northwest Territories
62: Nunavut

== Census divisions ==
The SGC code format for census divisions is XX YY, where XX is the above province/territory code, and YY is the census division's code, unique within its own province. Census divisions are generally numbered from east to west. In some locations, a similar policy to American FIPS county codes has been adopted, with even-numbered slots being left vacant for future expansion.

Examples:
10 04: Division No. 4, Newfoundland and Labrador
10 05: Division No. 5, Newfoundland and Labrador
13 08: Kent County, New Brunswick
13 09: Northumberland County, New Brunswick
13 10: York County, New Brunswick
24 64: Les Moulins Regional County Municipality, Quebec
24 65: Territoire équivalent of Laval, Quebec
24 66: Territoire équivalent of Montreal, Quebec
24 67: Roussillon Regional County Municipality, Quebec
24 68: Les Jardins-de-Napierville Regional County Municipality, Quebec
35 07: Leeds and Grenville United Counties, Ontario
35 08: [vacant slot]
35 09: Lanark County, Ontario
35 10: Frontenac Census Division, Ontario
47 04: Division No. 4, Saskatchewan
48 05: Division No. 5, Alberta
59 01: Regional District of East Kootenay, British Columbia
59 02: [vacant slot]
59 03: Regional District of Central Kootenay, British Columbia
59 04: [vacant slot]
59 05: Regional District of Kootenay Boundary, British Columbia

== Census subdivisions ==
The SGC code format for census subdivisions is XX YY ZZZ, where XX is the province/territory code, YY is the census division code, and ZZZ is the census subdivision's code, unique within its own census division. Census subdivisions are again generally numbered from east to west, and the practice has been to leave even-numbered slots vacant for future expansion.

Examples:
35 12 001: Tyendinaga, Ontario
35 12 002: Deseronto, Ontario
35 12 003: [vacant slot]
35 12 004: Tyendinaga Mohawk Territory, Ontario
35 12 005: Belleville, Ontario
35 12 006: [vacant slot]
62 04 001: Sanikiluaq, Nunavut
62 04 002: [vacant slot]
62 04 003: Iqaluit, Nunavut
62 04 004: [vacant slot]
62 04 005: Kimmirut, Nunavut
62 04 006: [vacant slot]
