= Kakisa Lake =

Lake in the Northwest Territories, Canada

- Location within Northwest Territories

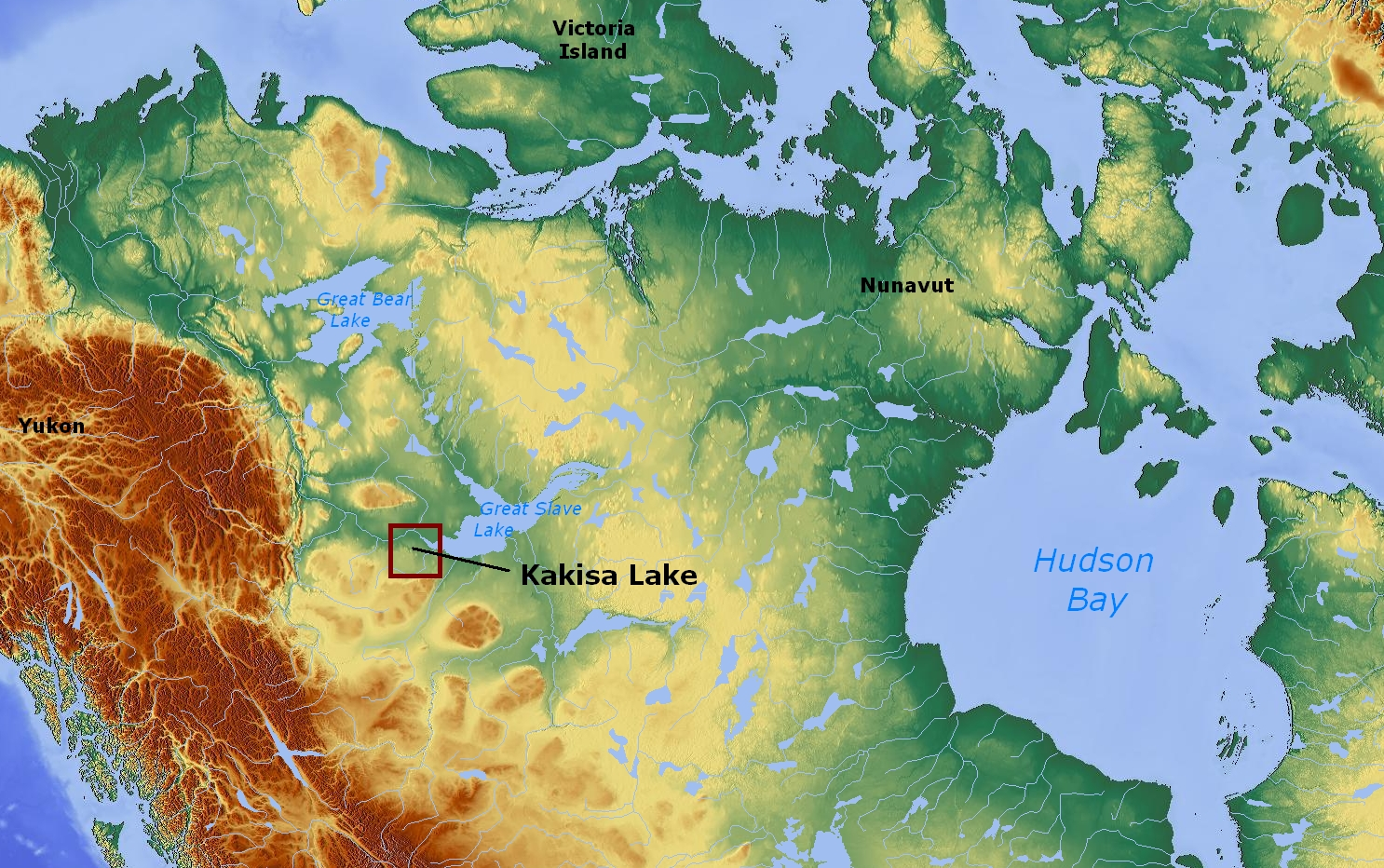
- Location: Northwest Territories
- Coordinates: 60°55′N 117°40′W
- Primary inflows: Kakisa River
- Basin countries: Canada
- Settlements: Designated Authority of Kakisa
- References: National Geospatial-Intelligence Agency

Kakisa Lake is a large lake located in the Northwest Territories, Canada. It is fed by the Kakisa River, and near to the community of Kakisa. An outcropping of the Kakisa Formation occurs along the side of this lake.

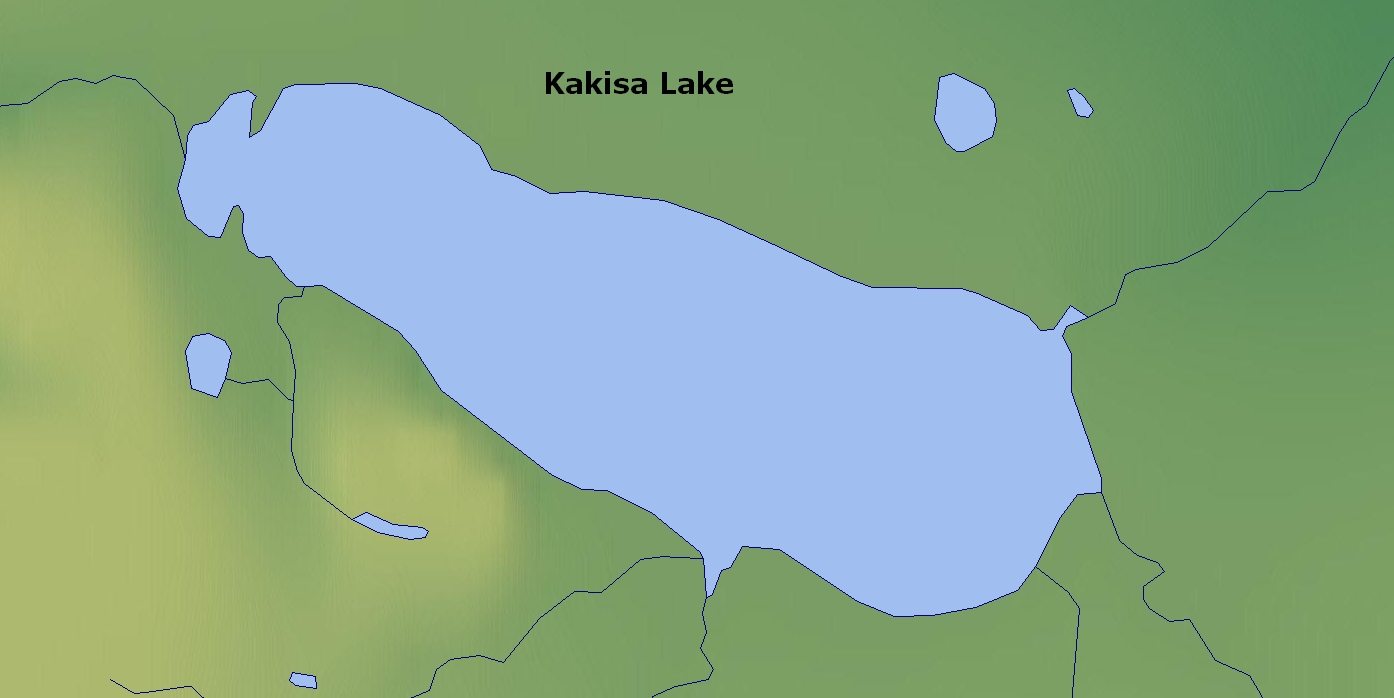
Map

== See also ==
- List of lakes in the Northwest Territories
