= Kakisa =

Kakisa K'ágee
- First Nation - Designated Authority (Ka'a'gee Tu First Nation)
- Location within Northwest Territories Location within Canada
- Coordinates: 60°56′24″N 117°24′51″W
- Country: Canada
- Territory: Northwest Territories
- Region: South Slave Region
- Constituency: Deh Cho
- Census division: Region 4
- Settled: 1962

Government
  - Chief: Lloyd Chicot
  - Council Manager: Ruby Landry
  - MLA: Ronald Bonnetrouge

Area
  - Land: 94.80 km^{2} (36.60 sq mi)

Population (2016)
  - Total: 36
  - Density: 0.4/km^{2} (1.0/sq mi)
- Time zone: UTC−07:00 (MST)
  - Summer (DST): UTC−06:00 (MDT)
- Canadian Postal code: X0E 1G4^{A}
- Area code: 867
- Telephone exchange: 825
- Living cost: 137.5^{B}
- Sources: Department of Municipal and Community Affairs, Prince of Wales Northern Heritage Centre, Canada Flight Supplement^APostal code shared with Hay River^B2013 figure based on Edmonton = 100

Kakisa (Slavey language: K’agee; between the willows) is a "Designated Authority" in the South Slave Region of the Northwest Territories, Canada. The community is located on Kakisa Lake, and is southeast of Fort Providence. Originally located at Tathlina Lake, the community moved, in 1962, to the present location in order to be closer to the Mackenzie Highway and is linked by a 13 km (8.1 mi) all-weather road.

== Demographics ==
Federal census population history of Kakisa
Year	Pop.	±%
1976	40	—
1981	36	−10.0%
1986	30	−16.7%
1991	39	+30.0%
1996	36	−7.7%
2001	40	+11.1%
2006	52	+30.0%
2011	45	−13.5%
2016	36	−20.0%
2021	39	+8.3%
Source: Statistics Canada

Annual population estimates

Year	Pop.	±%
2001	49	—
2002	49	+0.0%
2003	39	−20.4%
2004	57	+46.2%
2005	53	−7.0%
2006	54	+1.9%

Year	Pop.	±%
2007	55	+1.9%
2008	55	+0.0%
2009	56	+1.8%
2010	57	+1.8%
2011	56	−1.8%
2012	54	−3.6%

Sources: NWT Bureau of Statistics (2001–2012)

In the 2021 Census of Population conducted by Statistics Canada, Kakisa had a population of 39 living in 14 of its 19 total private dwellings, a change of 8.3% from its 2016 population of 36. With a land area of 95.14 km^{2} (36.73 sq mi), it had a population density of 0.4/km^{2} (1.1/sq mi) in 2021.

The majority of the community reported First Nations status. The main languages in the community are South Slavey and English.

== Services ==
Royal Canadian Mounted Police services are provided through Fort Providence and no health services are available. There is a single grocery store, the "River Front Convenience Store-Motel" which serves visitors to the nearby Lady Evelyn Falls. Education, up to Grade 9, is provided by Kakisa Lake School.

== First Nations ==
The Dene of the community are represented by the Ka'a'gee Tu First Nation and belong to the Dehcho First Nations.
