= Region 5, Northwest Territories =

Census division in the Northwest Territories, Canada

Coordinates: 60.0053°N 111.8906°W

Region 5 is the name of a census division, one of six in the Northwest Territories, Canada. It was introduced in the 2011 census, along with Regions 1, 2, 3, 4, and 6, resulting in the abolition of the former census divisions of Fort Smith Region and Inuvik Region (the latter not to be confused with the modern-day administrative region of the same name). Unlike in some other provinces, census divisions do not reflect the organization of local government in the Northwest Territories. These areas exist solely for the purposes of statistical analysis and presentation; they have no government of their own.

Its territory coincides roughly with much of the South Slave Region administrative region; however, it does not include the extreme western part of South Slave Region centered on Fort Providence, west of Great Slave Lake.

The 2011 census reported a population of 6,907 and a land area of 153,468.37 km^{2} (59,254.47 sq mi).

Main languages in the Region include English (86.4%), Dene (4.0%), French (2.2%), Slavey (1.6%) and Cree (1.5%).

== Demographics ==
In the 2021 Canadian census conducted by Statistics Canada, Region 5 of the Northwest Territories had a population of 6,279 living in 2,502 of its 3,055 total private dwellings, a change of −10% from its 2016 population of 6,980. With a land area of 152,135.92 km^{2} (58,740.01 sq mi), it had a population density of 0.0/km^{2} (0.1/sq mi) in 2021.

== Communities ==
- Towns
  - Fort Smith
  - Hay River
- Hamlets
  - Fort Resolution
- Settlements
  - Enterprise
  - Łutselk'e
  - Reliance
- Indian reserves
  - Salt Plains
