= Inuvik Region, Northwest Territories (former census division) =

Former Statistics Canada census division

Coordinates: 68°21′42″N 133°43′50″W

Inuvik Region census division

Inuvik Region was a former Statistics Canada census division, one of two in the Northwest Territories, Canada. It was abolished in the 2011 census, along with the other census division of Fort Smith Region, and the land area of the Northwest Territories was divided into new census divisions named Region 1, Region 2, Region 3, Region 4, Region 5, Region 6.

It is not to be confused with the modern-day Inuvik Region administrative region, which is smaller. The administrative region coincides territorially with modern-day census division Region 1; the census division included all of the modern-day Region 1 as well as a part of Region 2. For example, the border of the former Inuvik and Fort Smith census divisions ran through the middle of Great Bear Lake, but the lake is entirely outside of the Inuvik administrative region. The communities of Norman Wells, Colville Lake and Fort Good Hope were part of the census division, but not the administrative region.

It comprised the northern and western part of the Northwest Territories, with its main economic centre in the town of Inuvik. The 2006 census reported a population of 9,192 and a land area of 522,215.2 km^{2} (201,628.4 sq mi). This represented about 23 percent of the population and about 46 percent of the land area of the Northwest Territories.

== Census Division communities ==
- Towns
  - Inuvik
  - Norman Wells
- Hamlets
  - Aklavik
  - Fort McPherson
  - Holman (Ulukhaktok)
  - Sachs Harbour
  - Tuktoyaktuk
  - Tulita
- Chartered communities
  - Deline
  - Tsiigehtchic
- Settlements
  - Colville Lake
  - Fort Good Hope
  - Paulatuk
