= Region 6, Northwest Territories =

Canada census division

Coordinates: 62.4422°N 114.3970°W

Region 6 is the name of a Statistics Canada census division, one of six in the Northwest Territories, Canada. It was introduced in the 2011 census, along with Regions 1, 2, 3, 4, and 5, resulting in the abolition of the former census divisions of Fort Smith Region and Inuvik Region (the latter not to be confused with the modern-day administrative region of the same name). It includes the city of Yellowknife, and has the largest population by far of any of the six census divisions. Unlike in some other provinces, census divisions do not reflect the organization of local government in the Northwest Territories. These areas exist solely for the purposes of statistical analysis and presentation; they have no government of their own.

Its territorial outside boundary coincides roughly with the North Slave Region administrative region; however, Region 3 forms a sizeable enclave within it.

The 2011 census reported a population of 19,444 and a land area of 184,903.78 km^{2} (71,391.75 sq mi).

Main languages in the Region include English (80.7%), French (4.6%), Tagalog (2.7%) and Tlicho (1.9%).

== Demographics ==
In the 2021 Census of Population conducted by Statistics Canada, Region 6 of the Northwest Territories had a population of 20,805 living in 7,730 of its 8,374 total private dwellings, a change of 3.6% from its 2016 population of 20,090. With a land area of 182,201.5 km^{2} (70,348.4 sq mi), it had a population density of 0.1/km^{2} (0.3/sq mi) in 2021.

== Communities ==
- City
  - Yellowknife
- Settlements
  - Dettah
