= Region 1, Northwest Territories =

Statistics Canada census division

Coordinates: 68°21′42″N 133°43′50″W

Region 1 is the name of a Statistics Canada census division, one of six in the Northwest Territories, Canada. It was introduced in the 2011 census, along with Regions 2, 3, 4, 5 and 6, resulting in the abolition of the former census divisions of Fort Smith Region and Inuvik Region (the latter not to be confused with the modern-day administrative region of the same name). Unlike in some other provinces, census divisions do not reflect the organization of local government in the Northwest Territories. These areas exist solely for the purposes of statistical analysis and presentation; they have no government of their own.

Its territorial extent coincides with the Inuvik Region administrative region, which is somewhat smaller than the former census division of the same name.

It comprises the northern and western part of the Northwest Territories, with its main economic centre in the town of Inuvik. The 2011 census reported a population of 6,712 and a land area of 365,094.37 km^{2} (140,963.72 sq mi).

Main languages in the Region include English (85.2%), Inuvialuktun (7.4%), Gwich'in (3.6%), Inuktitut (1.4%) and French (1.1%)

== Demographics ==
In the 2021 Census of Population conducted by Statistics Canada, Region 1 of the Northwest Territories had a population of 6,205 living in 2,291 of its 2,774 total private dwellings, a change of -2.6% from its 2016 population of 6,372. With a land area of 357,015.13 km^{2} (137,844.31 sq mi), it had a population density of 0.0/km^{2} (0.0/sq mi) in 2021.

== Communities ==
- Town
  - Inuvik
- Hamlets
  - Aklavik
  - Fort McPherson
  - Paulatuk
  - Sachs Harbour
  - Tuktoyaktuk
  - Ulukhaktok
- Chartered community
  - Tsiigehtchic
