= Region 3, Northwest Territories =

Coordinates: 62.8025°N 116.0460°W

Region 3 is the name of a Statistics Canada census division, one of six in the Northwest Territories, Canada. It was introduced in the 2011 census, along with Regions 1, 2, 4, 5, and 6, resulting in the abolition of the former census divisions of Fort Smith Region and Inuvik Region (the latter not to be confused with the modern-day administrative region of the same name). Unlike in some other provinces, census divisions do not reflect the organization of local government in the Northwest Territories. These areas exist solely for the purposes of statistical analysis and presentation; they have no government of their own.

It is located within the North Slave Region administrative region and is entirely surrounded by Region 6. The region has the same communities as the Monfwi electoral district.

The 2011 census reported a population of 2,812 and a land area of 25,080.94 km^{2} (9,683.81 sq mi).

Main languages in the Region include Tlicho (57.4%) and English (41.0%)

== Demographics ==
In the 2021 Census of Population conducted by Statistics Canada, Region 3 of the Northwest Territories had a population of 2,650 living in 714 of its 862 total private dwellings, a change of −3.7% from its 2016 population of 2,751. With a land area of 24,796.95 km^{2} (9,574.16 sq mi), it had a population density of 0.1/km^{2} (0.3/sq mi) in 2021.

== Communities ==
- Community governments
  - Behchoko
  - Gamèti
  - Whatì
  - Wekweeti
