= Region 2, Northwest Territories =

Coordinates: 65.2811°N 126.8314°W

Region 2 is the name of a Statistics Canada census division, one of six in the Northwest Territories, Canada. It was introduced in the 2011 census, along with Regions 1, 3, 4, 5 and 6, resulting in the abolition of the former census divisions of Fort Smith Region and Inuvik Region (the latter not to be confused with the modern-day administrative region of the same name). Unlike in some other provinces, census divisions do not reflect the organization of local government in the Northwest Territories. These areas exist solely for the purposes of statistical analysis and presentation; they have no government of their own.

Its territorial extent coincides very closely with the Sahtu Region administrative region.

The 2011 census reported a population of 2,341 and a land area of 220,751.92 km^{2} (85,232.79 sq mi).

Main languages in the Region include English (71.6%) and Slavey (25.9%)

== Demographics ==
In the 2021 Census of Population conducted by Statistics Canada, Region 2 of the Northwest Territories had a population of 2,259 living in 818 of its 1,064 total private dwellings, a change of −7.2% from its 2016 population of 2,433. With a land area of 218,296.94 km^{2} (84,284.92 sq mi), it had a population density of 0.0/km^{2} (0.0/sq mi) in 2021.

== Communities ==
- Towns
  - Norman Wells
- Hamlets
  - Tulita
- Chartered communities
  - Deline
  - Fort Good Hope
- Settlements
  - Colville Lake
