= South Slave Region =

- Administrative region
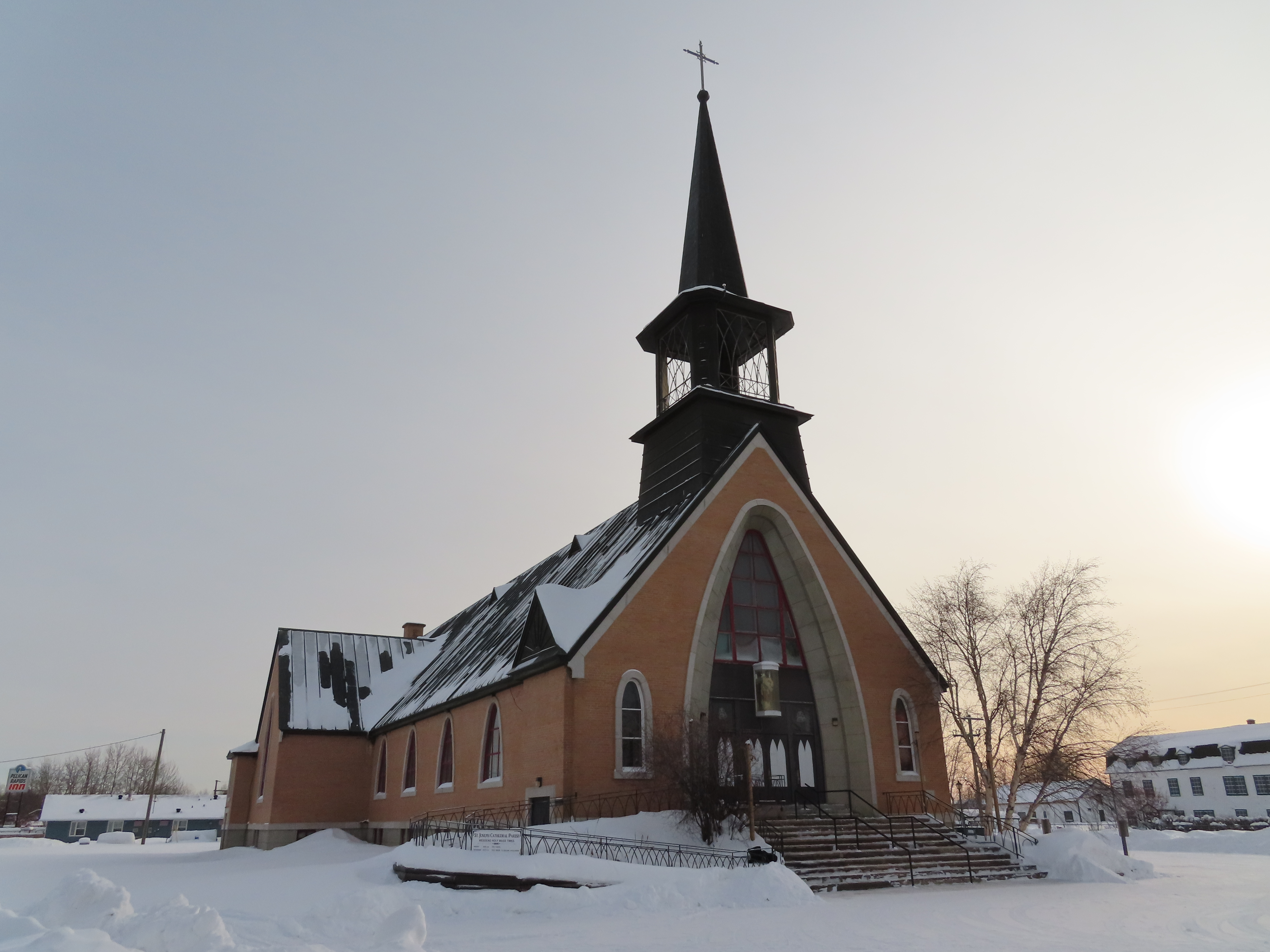
- St. Joseph Cathedral in Fort Smith

- Location within the Northwest Territories
- Country: Canada
- Territory: Northwest Territories
- Federal riding: Northwest Territories
- Territorial ridings: Deh Cho; Hay River North; Hay River South; Thebacha; Tu Nedhé-Wiilideh
- Regional offices: Fort Smith; Hay River (sub-office)

Population (2021)
  - Total: 6,820
  - Rank: 2nd NWT
  - % change (from 2016): −12.7
- Time zone: UTC−07:00 (MST)
  - Summer (DST): UTC−06:00 (DST)

South Slave Region communities in the Northwest Territories

The South Slave Region is one of five administrative regions in the Northwest Territories of Canada. According to Municipal and Community Affairs the region consists of seven communities with the regional office situated in Fort Smith and a sub-office in Hay River. With the exception of Enterprise and Hay River the communities are predominantly Indigenous, mainly First Nations.

== Communities ==
The South Slave Region includes the following communities:

Communities of the South Slave Region
Community				Demographics (2021)					
Name		Governance		Census		Indigenous population profile			
Official	Traditional	Type	Municipality	Total	Change (from 2016)	First Nations	Métis	Inuit	Other
Enterprise		Hamlet	Yes	75	-29.2%	20	10	0	65
Fort Providence	Zhahti Kų́ę́	Hamlet	Yes	618	-11.1%	540	45	0	75
Fort Resolution	Denı́nu Kų́ę́	Hamlet	Yes	412	-12.3%	300	85	15 (Note: 10 Inuvialuit)	75
Fort Smith	Tthebacha	Town	Yes	2,248	-11.6%	985	420	160 (Note: 80 Inuvialuit)	1,290
Hay River	Xátł'odehchee	Town	Yes	3,169	-10.2%	910	475	125 (Note: 55 Inuvialuit)	2,300
Hay River Dene 1 (Hay River Reserve)	Xátł'odehchee	Indian reserve	No	259	-16.2%	245	10	0	15
Kakisa	K'ágee	Designated authority	No	39	8.3%	Not enumerated			

Historical population

Year	Pop.	±%
2001	7,802	—
2002	7,802	+0.0%
2003	7,872	+0.9%
2004	8,027	+2.0%
2005	7,990	−0.5%
2006	7,908	−1.0%
2007	8,002	+1.2%
2008	7,899	−1.3%
2009	7,860	−0.5%

Year	Pop.	±%
2010	7,912	+0.7%
2011	7,986	+0.9%
2012	7,983	−0.0%
2013	8,030	+0.6%
2014	8,010	−0.2%
2015	7,993	−0.2%
2016	8,062	+0.9%
2017	8,027	−0.4%

Sources: NWT Bureau of Statistics (2001 - 2017). Does not include Kakisa as figures only available for five years.

== Communities of the South Slave Region ==
Communities of the South Slave Region
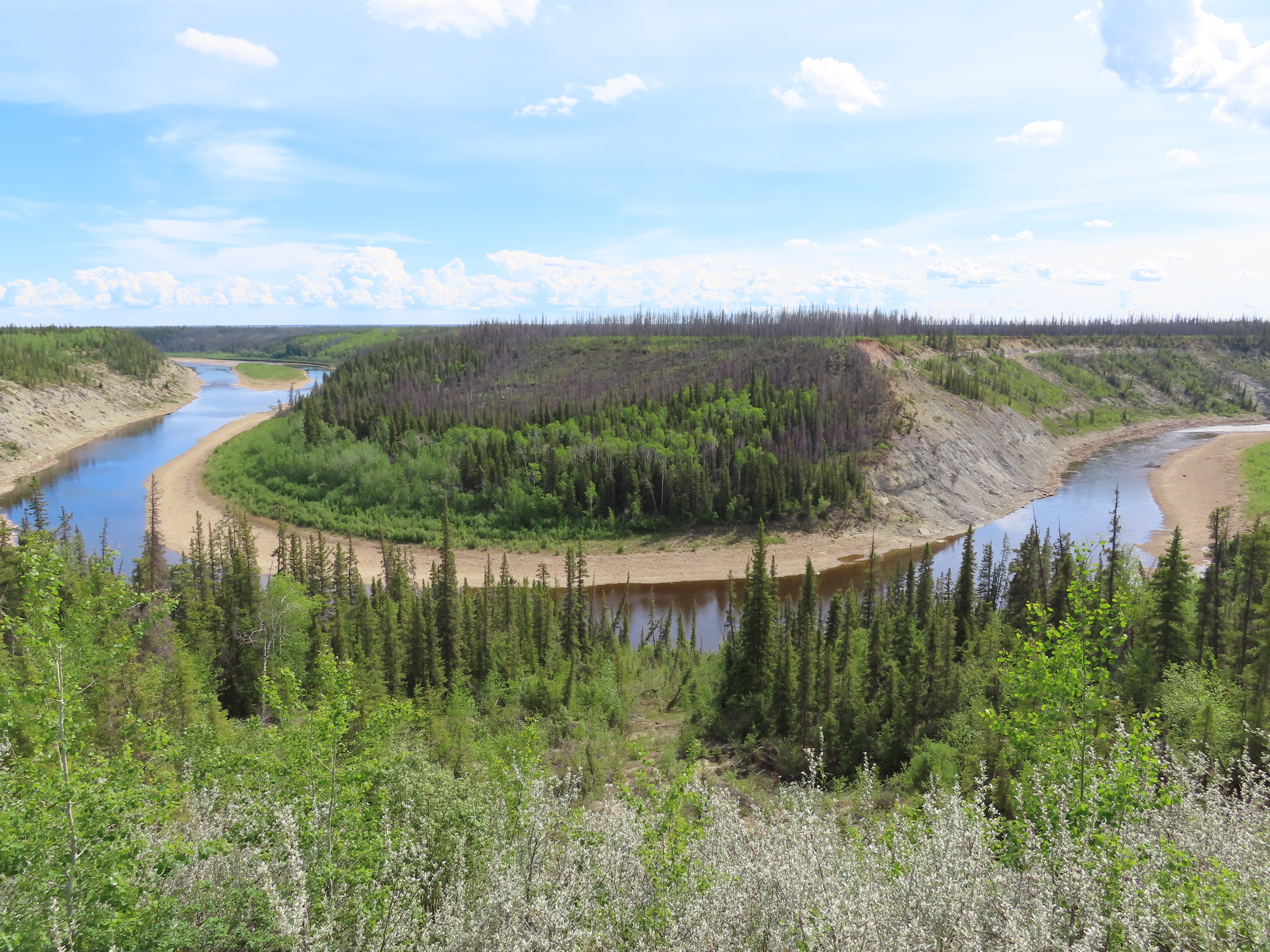
The Hay River at Enterprise (2019)

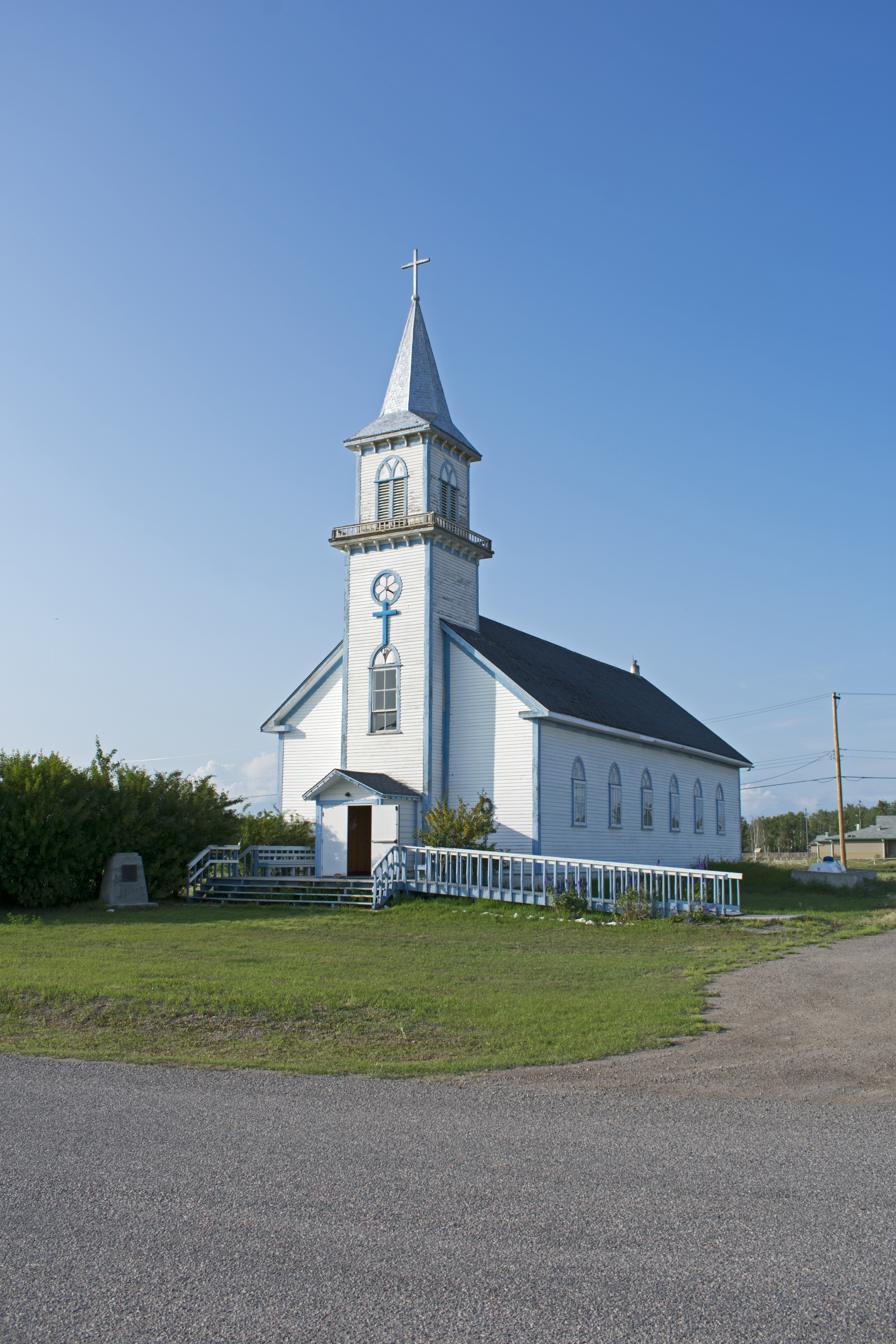
Our Lady of Providence Church, Fort Providence (2019)

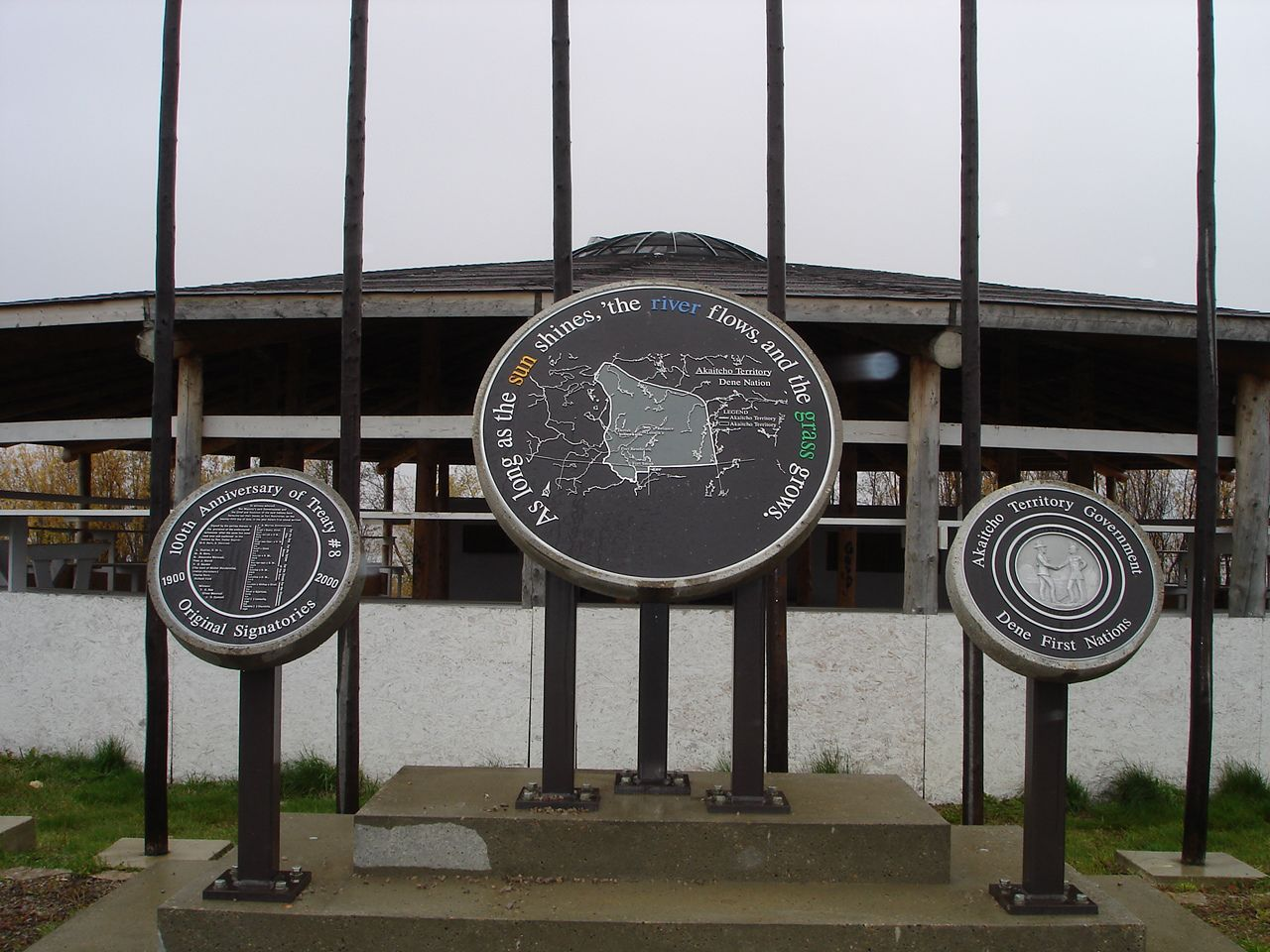
Treaty 8 site at Fort Resolution (2011)

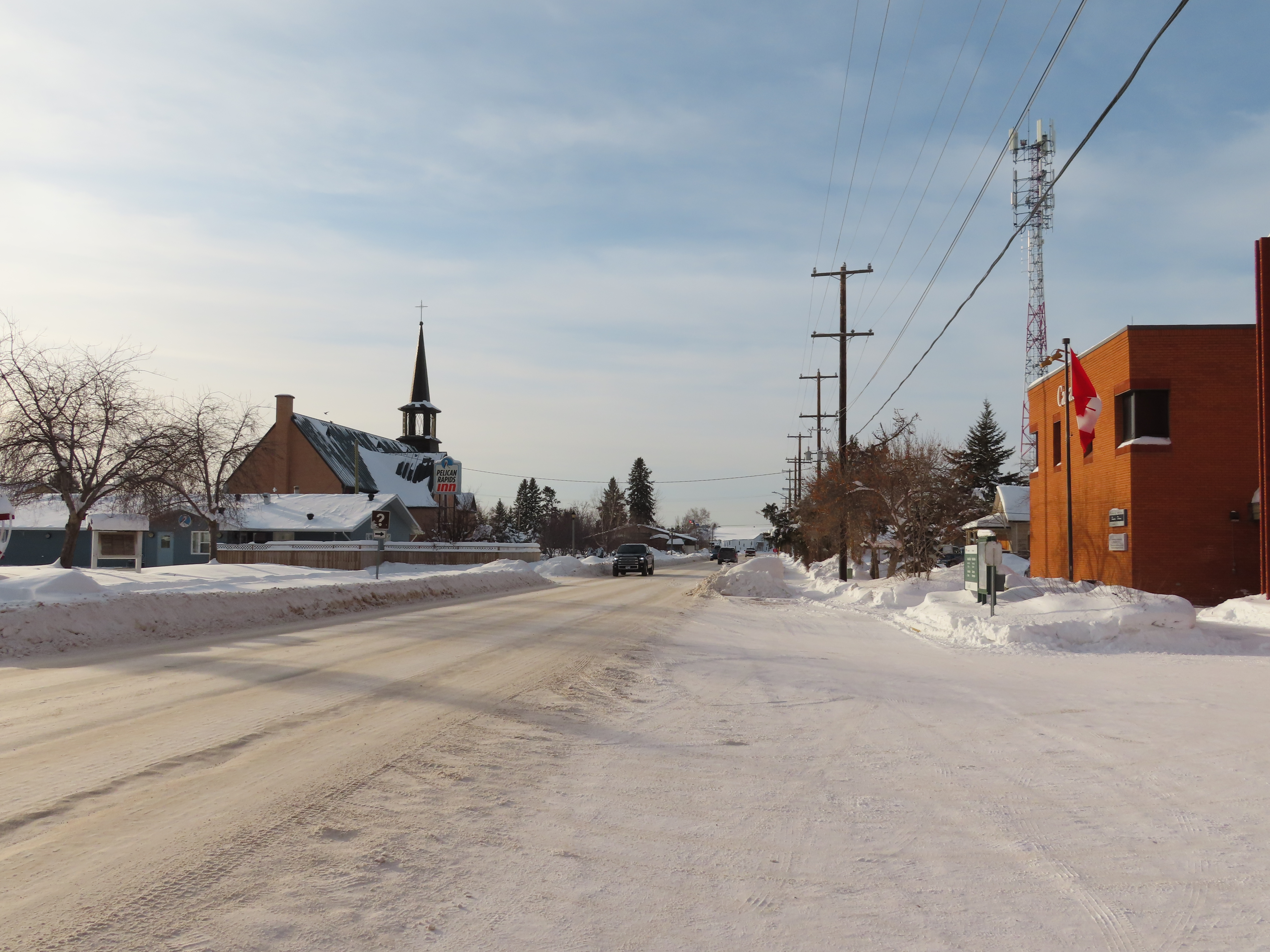
Fort Smith (2020)

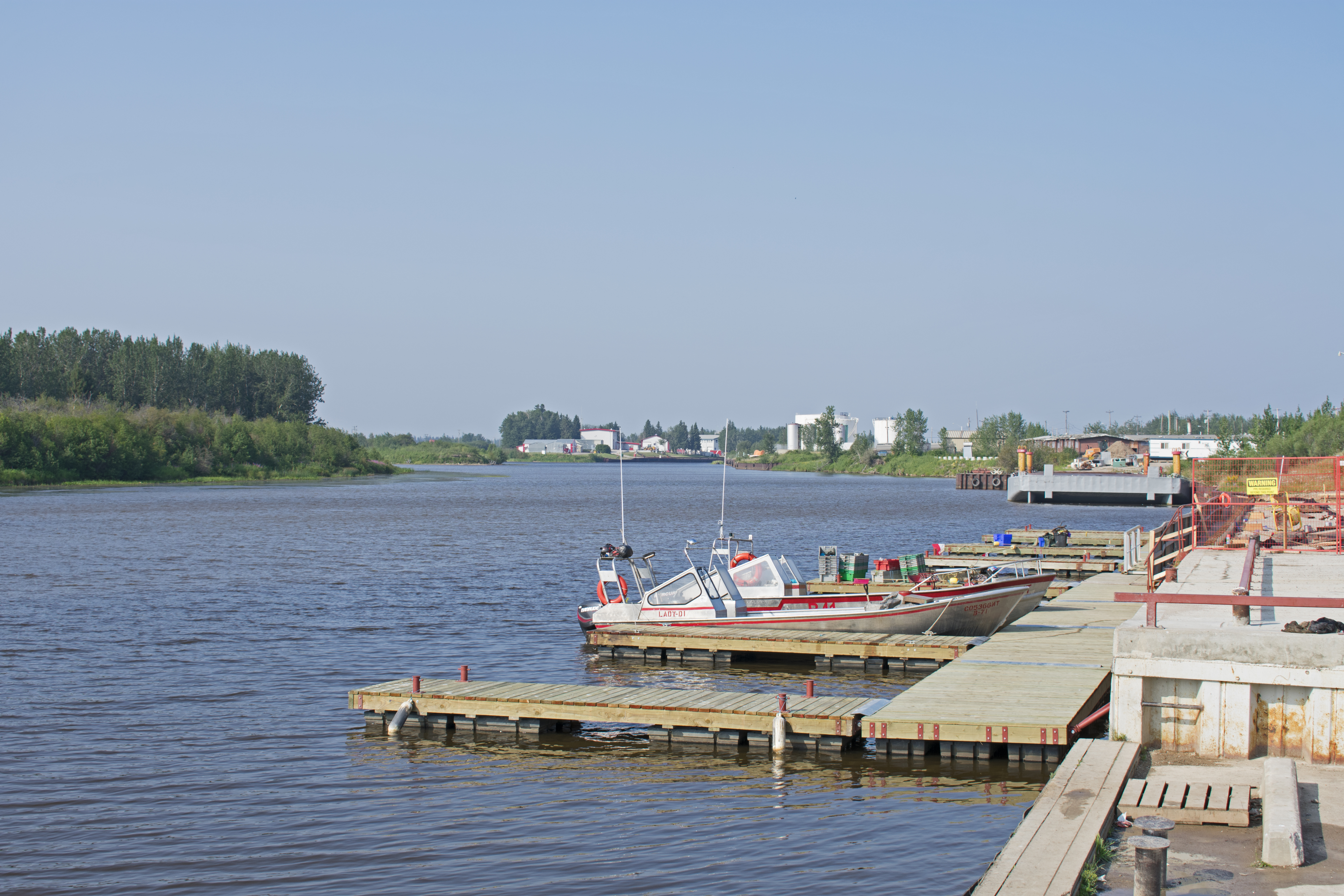
Fisherman's Wharf, Hay River (2019)

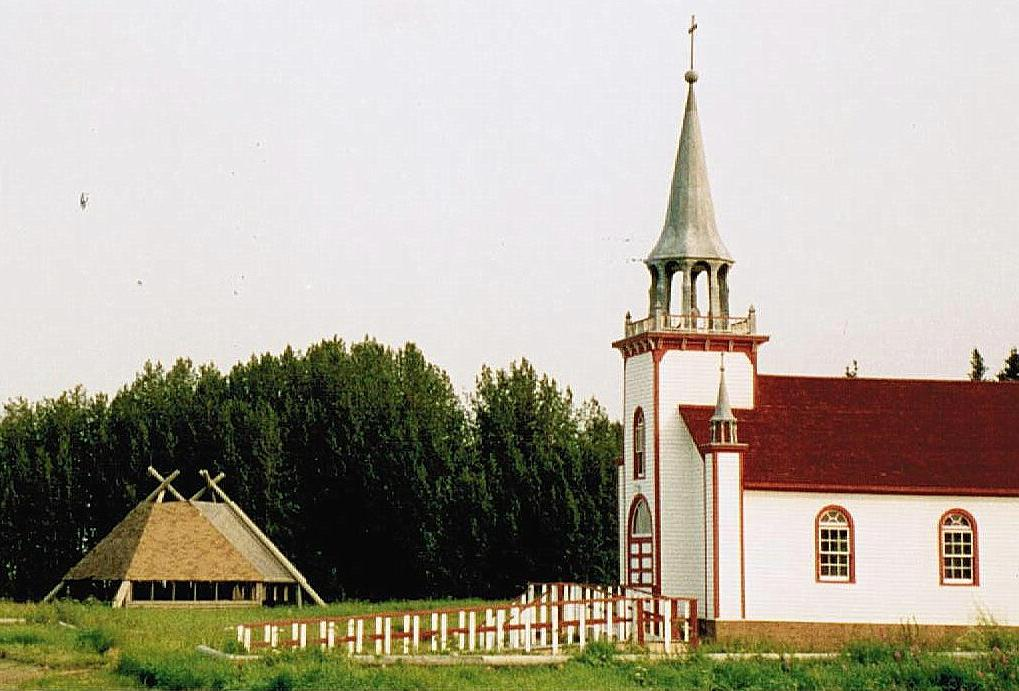
Ste. Anne's Roman Catholic Church, Haay River Reserve (1998)

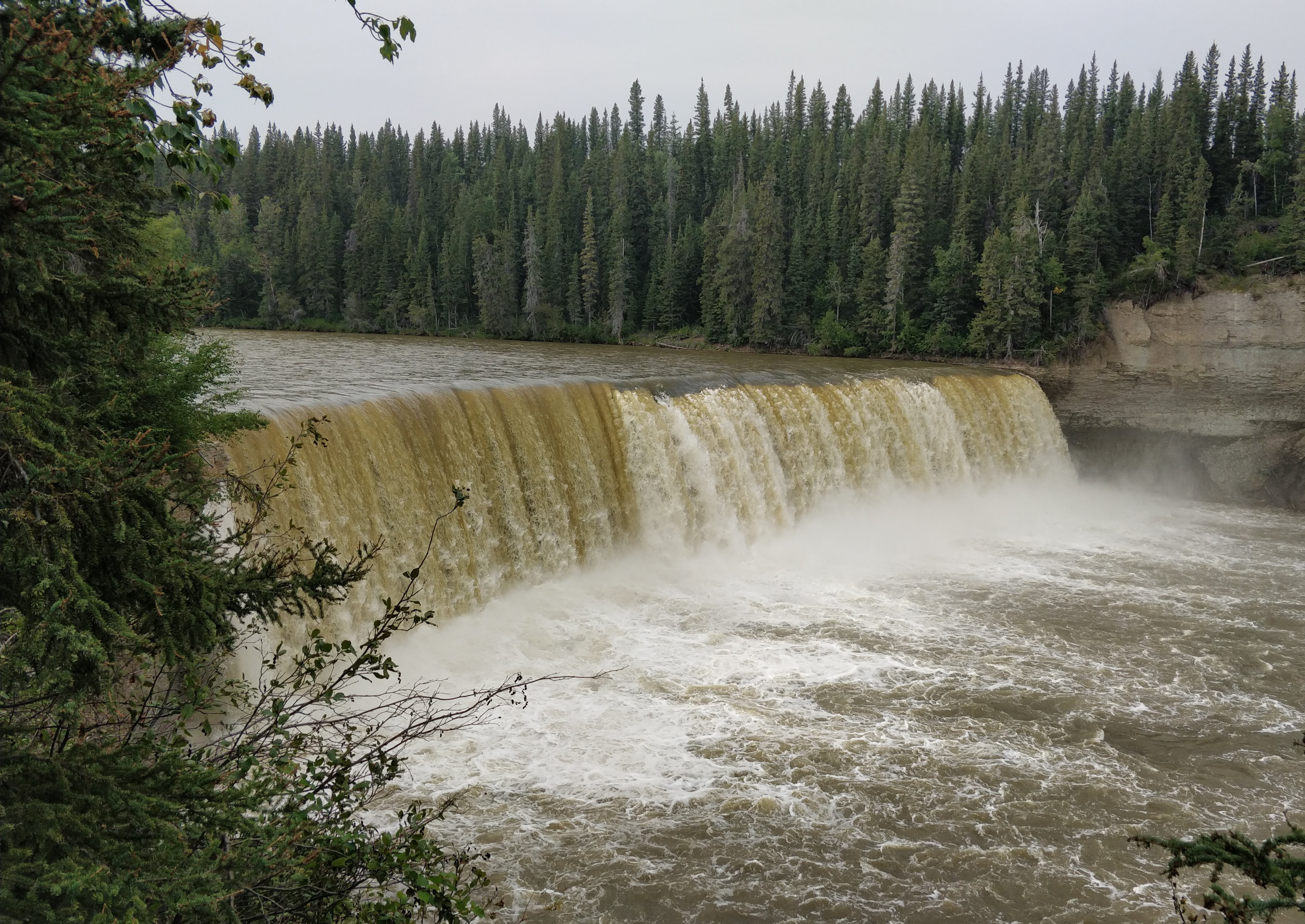
Lady Evelyn Falls outside Kakisa (2018)

== Climate ==
Climate data for Fort Providence WMO ID: 71087; coordinates 61°19′01″N 117°36′07″W; elevation: 161.5 m (530 ft); 1991−2020 normals
Month	Jan	Feb	Mar	Apr	May	Jun	Jul	Aug	Sep	Oct	Nov	Dec	Year
Record high humidex	10.1	9.6	16.4	22.9	31.2	35.7	37.9	36.5	31.8	24.1	11.9	11.8	37.9
Record high °C (°F)	7.0 (44.6)	9.9 (49.8)	16.5 (61.7)	22.9 (73.2)	31.3 (88.3)	34.3 (93.7)	35.2 (95.4)	35.3 (95.5)	30.7 (87.3)	24.2 (75.6)	12.0 (53.6)	11.8 (53.2)	35.3 (95.5)
Mean daily maximum °C (°F)	−18.5 (−1.3)	−13.2 (8.2)	−6.5 (20.3)	4.9 (40.8)	13.9 (57.0)	21.3 (70.3)	23.9 (75.0)	21.0 (69.8)	14.3 (57.7)	3.7 (38.7)	−8.5 (16.7)	−16.6 (2.1)	3.3 (37.9)
Daily mean °C (°F)	−22.9 (−9.2)	−19.0 (−2.2)	−13.8 (7.2)	−1.9 (28.6)	7.1 (44.8)	14.1 (57.4)	17.1 (62.8)	14.7 (58.5)	8.6 (47.5)	−0.1 (31.8)	−12.4 (9.7)	−20.6 (−5.1)	−2.4 (27.7)
Mean daily minimum °C (°F)	−27.2 (−17.0)	−24.7 (−12.5)	−21.2 (−6.2)	−8.7 (16.3)	0.3 (32.5)	6.8 (44.2)	10.3 (50.5)	8.3 (46.9)	2.8 (37.0)	−3.9 (25.0)	−16.1 (3.0)	−24.4 (−11.9)	−8.1 (17.4)
Record low °C (°F)	−46.8 (−52.2)	−43.5 (−46.3)	−40.4 (−40.7)	−36.0 (−32.8)	−16.3 (2.7)	−3.5 (25.7)	−2.0 (28.4)	−2.3 (27.9)	−9.9 (14.2)	−27.3 (−17.1)	−36.8 (−34.2)	−43.3 (−45.9)	−46.8 (−52.2)
Record low wind chill	−51.2	−52.5	−46.5	−43.0	−23.8	−5.2	−3.2	−4.2	−11.8	−33.7	−40.9	−51.0	−52.5
Average relative humidity (%) (at 1500 LST)	75.4	67.0	52.5	44.7	41.5	42.9	46.2	50.9	55.0	71.1	82.7	79.7	59.1
Source: Environment and Climate Change Canada

Climate data for Fort Smith (Fort Smith Airport) WMO ID: 71934; coordinates 60°01′13″N 111°57′43″W; elevation: 205.1 m (673 ft); 1991−2020 normals, extremes 1913−present (Note: Climate data was recorded at Fort Smith from July 1913 to May 1946 and at Fort Smith Airport from September 1943 to present.)
Month	Jan	Feb	Mar	Apr	May	Jun	Jul	Aug	Sep	Oct	Nov	Dec	Year
Record high humidex	8.4	11.6	16.1	29.6	32.7	38.9	41.7	38.5	31.9	25.9	12.2	8.9	41.7
Record high °C (°F)	8.7 (47.7)	9.9 (49.8)	16.7 (62.1)	24.0 (75.2)	31.0 (87.8)	39.9 (103.8)	39.4 (102.9)	33.9 (93.0)	29.4 (84.9)	24.6 (76.3)	12.0 (53.6)	9.4 (48.9)	39.9 (103.8)
Mean daily maximum °C (°F)	−17.4 (0.7)	−13.2 (8.2)	−5.1 (22.8)	5.6 (42.1)	14.8 (58.6)	21.6 (70.9)	23.6 (74.5)	21.2 (70.2)	14.2 (57.6)	4.3 (39.7)	−7.0 (19.4)	−14.5 (5.9)	4.0 (39.2)
Daily mean °C (°F)	−21.9 (−7.4)	−18.8 (−1.8)	−11.9 (10.6)	−0.7 (30.7)	8.2 (46.8)	15.0 (59.0)	17.4 (63.3)	15.1 (59.2)	8.9 (48.0)	0.5 (32.9)	−10.6 (12.9)	−18.6 (−1.5)	−1.4 (29.5)
Mean daily minimum °C (°F)	−26.2 (−15.2)	−24.3 (−11.7)	−18.6 (−1.5)	−7.1 (19.2)	1.6 (34.9)	8.4 (47.1)	11.1 (52.0)	9.0 (48.2)	3.5 (38.3)	−3.3 (26.1)	−14.1 (6.6)	−22.6 (−8.7)	−6.9 (19.6)
Record low °C (°F)	−49.4 (−56.9)	−53.9 (−65.0)	−44.4 (−47.9)	−40.6 (−41.1)	−23.0 (−9.4)	−6.1 (21.0)	−3.3 (26.1)	−5.6 (21.9)	−12.8 (9.0)	−27.9 (−18.2)	−40.6 (−41.1)	−57.2 (−71.0)	−57.2 (−71.0)
Record low wind chill	−60.4	−58.4	−55.7	−50.4	−26.2	−8.0	0.0	−4.7	−17.8	−35.3	−48.8	−59.6	−60.4
Average precipitation mm (inches)	17.6 (0.69)	12.7 (0.50)	14.6 (0.57)	13.7 (0.54)	27.2 (1.07)	47.0 (1.85)	58.5 (2.30)	57.4 (2.26)	42.9 (1.69)	30.1 (1.19)	21.9 (0.86)	16.5 (0.65)	360.1 (14.18)
Average rainfall mm (inches)	0.1 (0.00)	0.1 (0.00)	0.4 (0.02)	6.6 (0.26)	22.0 (0.87)	48.2 (1.90)	60.2 (2.37)	61.8 (2.43)	45.2 (1.78)	15.7 (0.62)	1.1 (0.04)	0.4 (0.02)	261.7 (10.30)
Average snowfall cm (inches)	24.5 (9.6)	17.2 (6.8)	17.0 (6.7)	7.5 (3.0)	5.6 (2.2)	0.0 (0.0)	0.0 (0.0)	0.0 (0.0)	0.8 (0.3)	18.9 (7.4)	29.0 (11.4)	21.9 (8.6)	142.2 (56.0)
Average precipitation days (≥ 0.2 mm)	13.3	10.4	10.0	7.5	9.2	10.7	12.2	13.5	12.6	14.6	13.7	13.0	140.8
Average rainy days (≥ 0.2 mm)	0.15	0.12	0.54	2.7	6.6	10.0	12.2	13.2	12	8.2	1.4	0.46	67.6
Average snowy days (≥ 0.2 cm)	12.9	10.2	8.6	3.6	1.9	0.0	0.0	0.0	0.64	8.0	14.8	14.0	74.6
Average relative humidity (%) (at 1500 LST)	78.6	74.7	62.2	47.7	40.1	43.0	48.3	52.6	56.8	71.1	83.1	81.9	61.7
Mean monthly sunshine hours	57.1	113.7	176.7	243	285.9	299.1	301	261.7	132	87.3	43.5	28.3	2,029.3
Source: Environment and Climate Change Canada (June maximum) (December minimum) (sun 1951–1980)

Climate data for Hay River (Hay River/Merlyn Carter Airport) WMO ID: 71935; coordinates 60°50′23″N 115°46′58″W; elevation: 164.9 m (541 ft); 1991–2020 normals, extremes 1893–present (Note: Climate data was recorded at Hay River from September 1893 to June 1943 and at Hay River Airport from April 1943 to present.)
Month	Jan	Feb	Mar	Apr	May	Jun	Jul	Aug	Sep	Oct	Nov	Dec	Year
Record high humidex	10.6	12.9	17.3	25.8	31.1	35.1	44.6	39.8	32.2	25.4	12.8	11.2	44.6
Record high °C (°F)	10.7 (51.3)	13.9 (57.0)	17.6 (63.7)	26.0 (78.8)	33.3 (91.9)	34.0 (93.2)	35.6 (96.1)	36.7 (98.1)	31.7 (89.1)	25.6 (78.1)	15.0 (59.0)	14.4 (57.9)	36.7 (98.1)
Mean daily maximum °C (°F)	−16.9 (1.6)	−13.7 (7.3)	−7.7 (18.1)	2.4 (36.3)	11.4 (52.5)	18.4 (65.1)	21.7 (71.1)	19.9 (67.8)	13.8 (56.8)	4.3 (39.7)	−7.0 (19.4)	−14.2 (6.4)	2.7 (36.9)
Daily mean °C (°F)	−21.4 (−6.5)	−19.1 (−2.4)	−13.7 (7.3)	−3.1 (26.4)	5.9 (42.6)	12.9 (55.2)	16.6 (61.9)	14.9 (58.8)	9.2 (48.6)	0.8 (33.4)	−10.7 (12.7)	−18.4 (−1.1)	−2.2 (28.0)
Mean daily minimum °C (°F)	−25.8 (−14.4)	−24.3 (−11.7)	−19.6 (−3.3)	−8.6 (16.5)	0.3 (32.5)	7.4 (45.3)	11.5 (52.7)	9.8 (49.6)	4.5 (40.1)	−2.7 (27.1)	−14.4 (6.1)	−22.6 (−8.7)	−7.0 (19.4)
Record low °C (°F)	−52.2 (−62.0)	−50.6 (−59.1)	−47.2 (−53.0)	−40.0 (−40.0)	−24.4 (−11.9)	−6.1 (21.0)	−1.7 (28.9)	−6.7 (19.9)	−15.6 (3.9)	−26.1 (−15.0)	−40.8 (−41.4)	−51.2 (−60.2)	−52.2 (−62.0)
Record low wind chill	−58.7	−60.4	−54.9	−47.7	−26.6	−7.4	0.0	0.0	−17.1	−34.3	−54.4	−55.8	−60.4
Average precipitation mm (inches)	16.6 (0.65)	13.9 (0.55)	15.3 (0.60)	11.1 (0.44)	20.8 (0.82)	25.4 (1.00)	41.9 (1.65)	59.7 (2.35)	42.3 (1.67)	33.0 (1.30)	24.0 (0.94)	16.4 (0.65)	320.3 (12.61)
Average rainfall mm (inches)	0.3 (0.01)	0.2 (0.01)	0.3 (0.01)	3.9 (0.15)	16.2 (0.64)	25.1 (0.99)	43.8 (1.72)	60.2 (2.37)	42.9 (1.69)	15.9 (0.63)	0.8 (0.03)	0.3 (0.01)	209.9 (8.26)
Average snowfall cm (inches)	22.2 (8.7)	16.6 (6.5)	16.8 (6.6)	8.9 (3.5)	4.3 (1.7)	0.0 (0.0)	0.0 (0.0)	0.0 (0.0)	1.1 (0.4)	19.1 (7.5)	34.4 (13.5)	22.1 (8.7)	145.5 (57.3)
Average precipitation days (≥ 0.2 mm)	11.7	10.8	9.7	5.3	6.9	8.4	9.8	11.2	11.7	12.4	13.2	11.8	123.0
Average rainy days (≥ 0.2 mm)	0.2	0.1	0.3	2.0	5.5	8.3	9.7	11.1	11.9	6.6	1.0	0.5	57.2
Average snowy days (≥ 0.2 cm)	12.2	9.6	8.5	3.3	1.7	0.0	0.0	0.0	0.7	6.9	13.8	12.5	69.1
Average relative humidity (%) (at 1500 LST)	70.5	67.3	60.8	59.2	53.6	54.1	56.9	59.3	61.2	70.6	79.2	74.8	64.0
Source: Environment and Climate Change Canada (January minimum) (February minimum) (March minimum) (April minimum) (May minimum) (June minimum) (July minimum / maximum) (August minimum) (September minimum / maximum) (October minimum / maximum) (December minimum / maximum)
