= Inuvik Region =

Administrative region in the Northwest Territories, Canada

- Administrative region
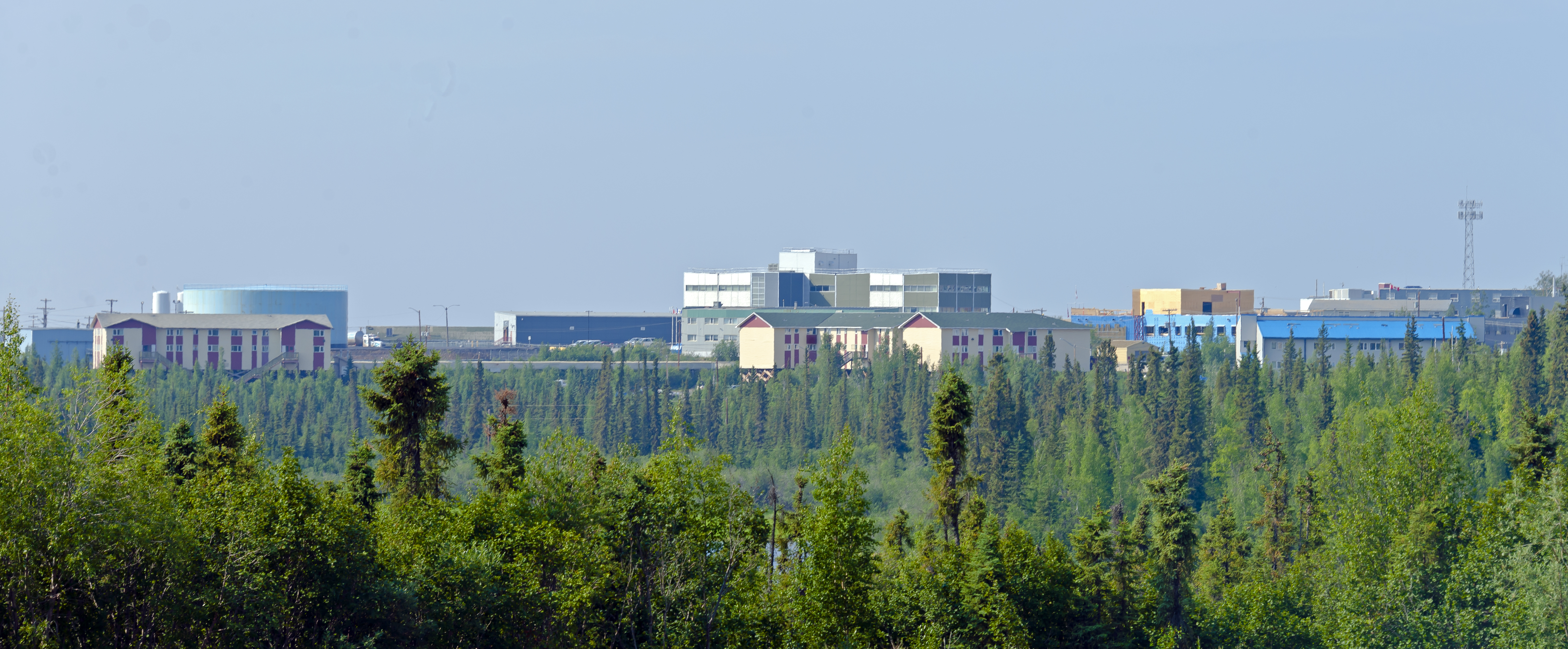
- Skyline of the town of Inuvik

- Location within the Northwest Territories
- Country: Canada
- Territory: Northwest Territories
- Federal riding: Northwest Territories
- Territorial ridings: Inuvik Boot Lake; Inuvik Twin Lakes; Mackenzie Delta; Nunakput
- Regional office: Inuvik

Area
  - Total: 387,400 km^{2} (149,600 sq mi)

Population (2021)
  - Total: 6,205
  - Rank: 3rd NWT
  - Density: 0.01602/km^{2} (0.04148/sq mi)
  - % change (from 2016): −1.9
- Time zone: UTC−07:00 (MST)
  - Summer (DST): UTC−06:00 (DST)

Inuvik Region communities in the Northwest Territories

The Inuvik Region or Beaufort Delta Region is one of five administrative regions in the Northwest Territories of Canada. According to Municipal and Community Affairs the region consists of eight communities with the regional office situated in Inuvik. Most of the communities are in the Beaufort Sea area and are a mixture of Inuit (mostly Inuvialuit) and First Nations (mostly Gwichʼin).

Formerly, there was also a Statistics Canada designated census division named Inuvik Region, Northwest Territories, which was abolished in the 2011 Canadian census. The territorial extent of this census division was somewhat larger than the administrative region of the same name.

== Administrative Region communities ==
The Inuvik Region administrative entity includes the following communities:

Communities of the Inuvik Region
Community				Demographics (2021)					
Name		Governance		Census		Indigenous population profile			
Official	Traditional	Type	Municipality	Total	Change (from 2016)	First Nations	Métis	Inuit (Inuvialuit)	Other
Aklavik	Akłarvik	Hamlet	Yes	536	-9.2%	220	15	390	70
Fort McPherson	Teetł'it Zheh	Hamlet	Yes	647	-7.6%	560	30	85	105
Inuvik	Inuuvik	Town	Yes	3,137	-3.3%	840	125	1,415	1,570
Paulatuk	Paulatuuq	Hamlet	Yes	298	12.5%	0	0	280	40
Sachs Harbour	Ikaahuk	Hamlet	Yes	104	1.0%	10	0	95	35
Tsiigehtchic	Tsiigehtshik	Charter community	Yes	138	-19.8%	115	15	0	55
Tuktoyaktuk	Tuktuujaqrtuuq	Hamlet	Yes	937	4.3%	45	0	825	140
Ulukhaktok	Ulukhaqtuuq	Hamlet	Yes	408	3.0%	10	0	380	50

Historical population

Year	Pop.	±%
2001	6,972	—
2002	7,087	+1.6%
2003	7,077	−0.1%
2004	7,059	−0.3%
2005	7,085	+0.4%
2006	6,996	−1.3%
2007	6,969	−0.4%
2008	6,957	−0.2%
2009	6,953	−0.1%

Year	Pop.	±%
2010	6,996	+0.6%
2011	6,949	−0.7%
2012	6,909	−0.6%
2013	6,826	−1.2%
2014	6,756	−1.0%
2015	6,706	−0.7%
2016	6,717	+0.2%
2017	6,673	−0.7%

Sources: NWT Bureau of Statistics (2001 - 2017)

== Communities in the Inuvik Region ==
Communities in the Inuvik Region
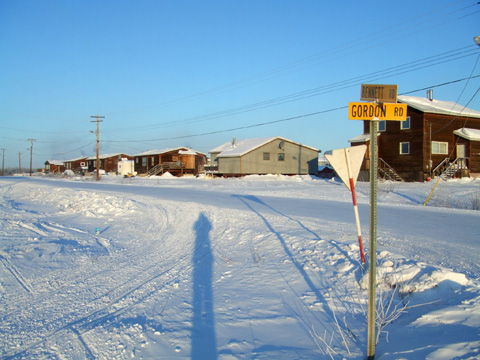
Aklavik (2008)

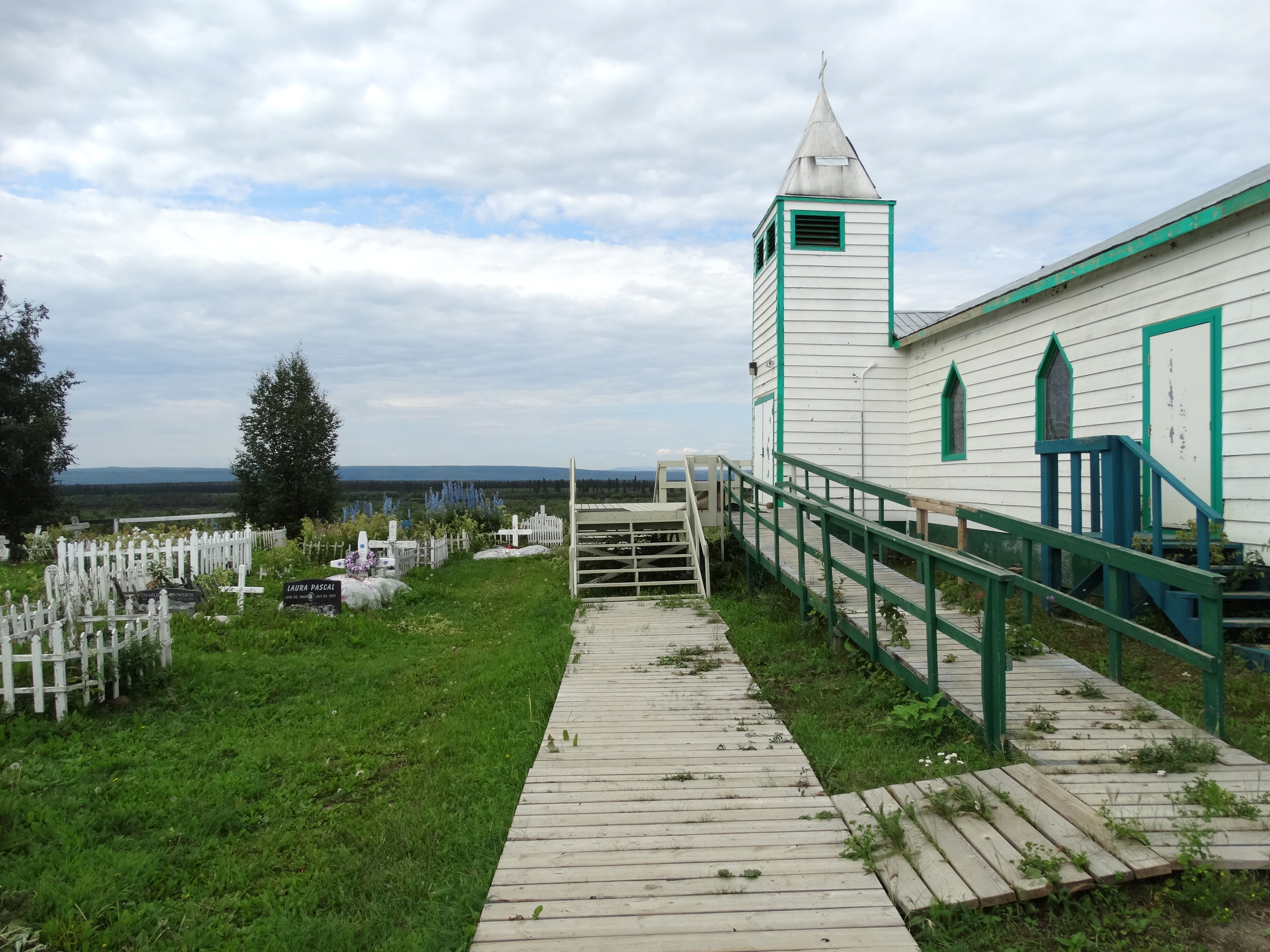
St. Matthew's Anglican Church, Fort McPherson (2013)

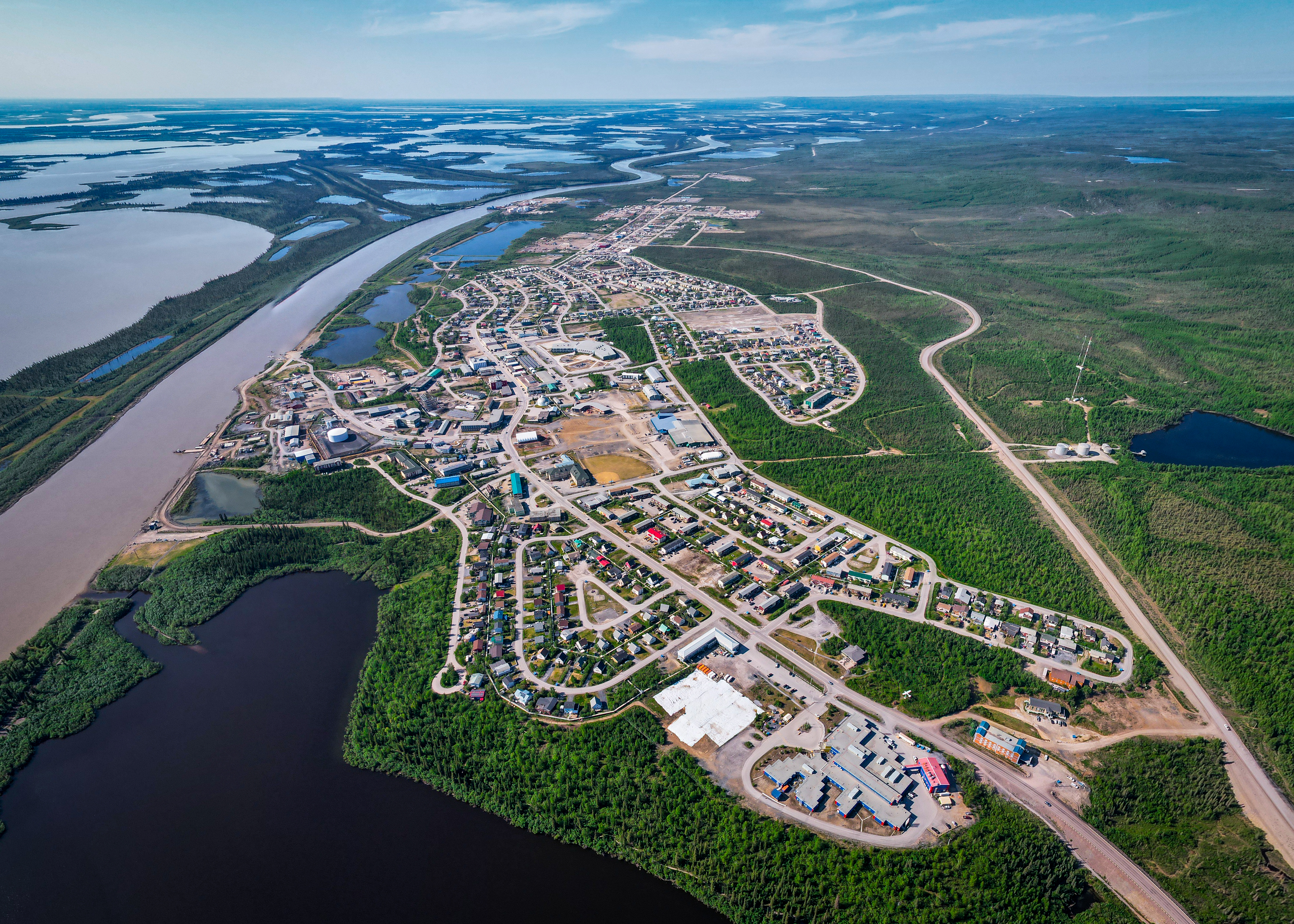
Inuvik (2021)

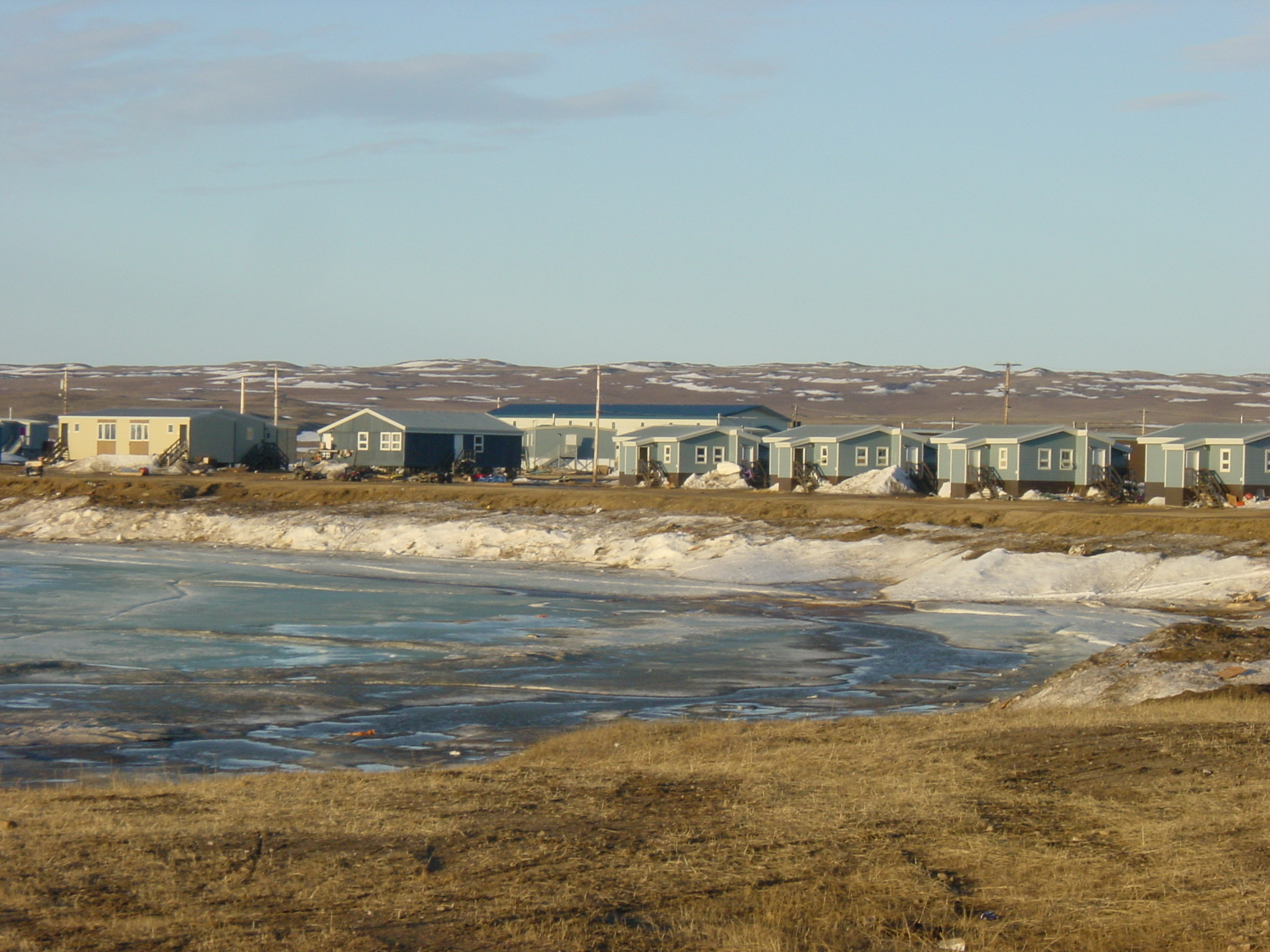
Paulatuk (2005)

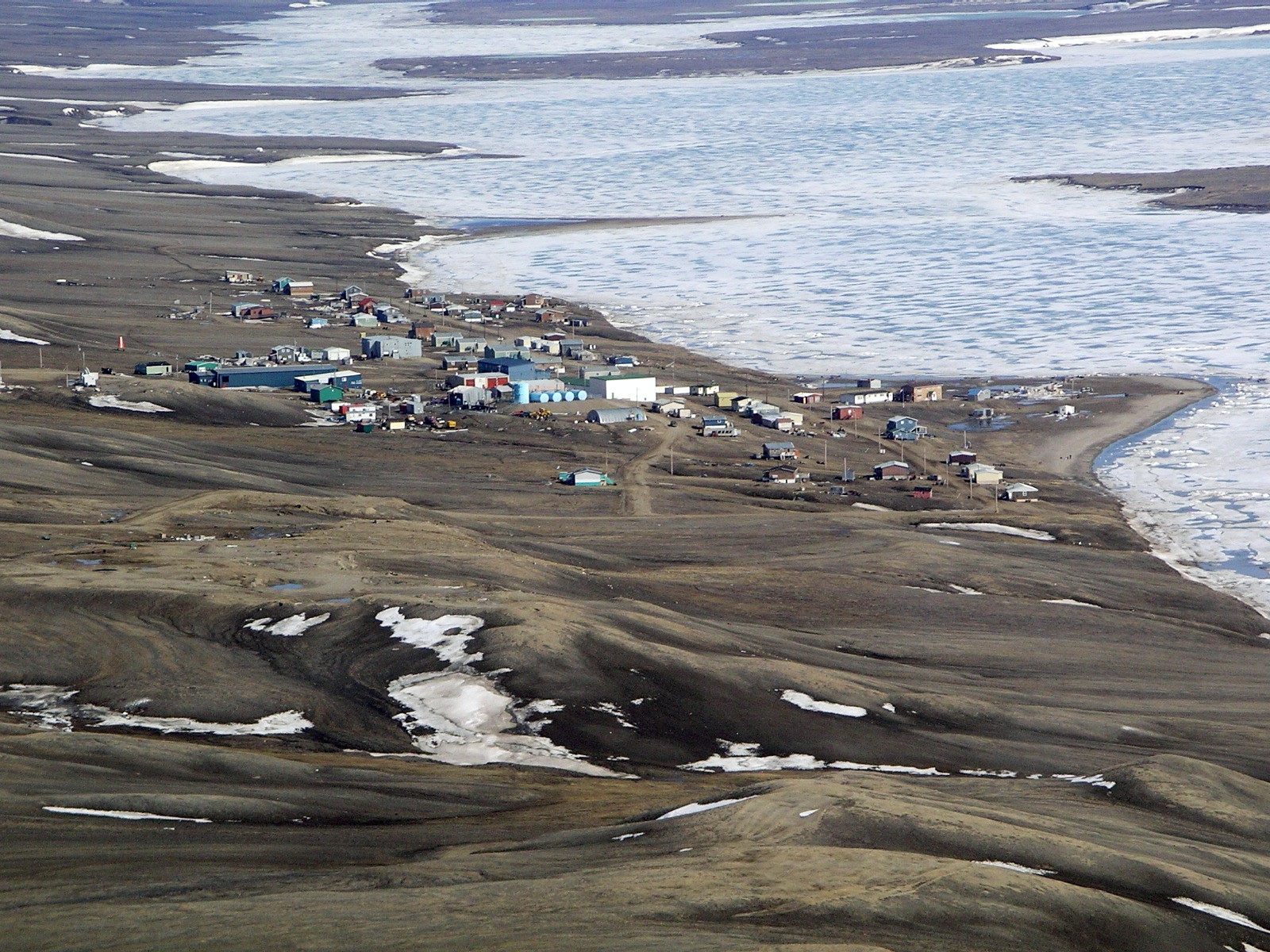
Sachs Harbour (2006)

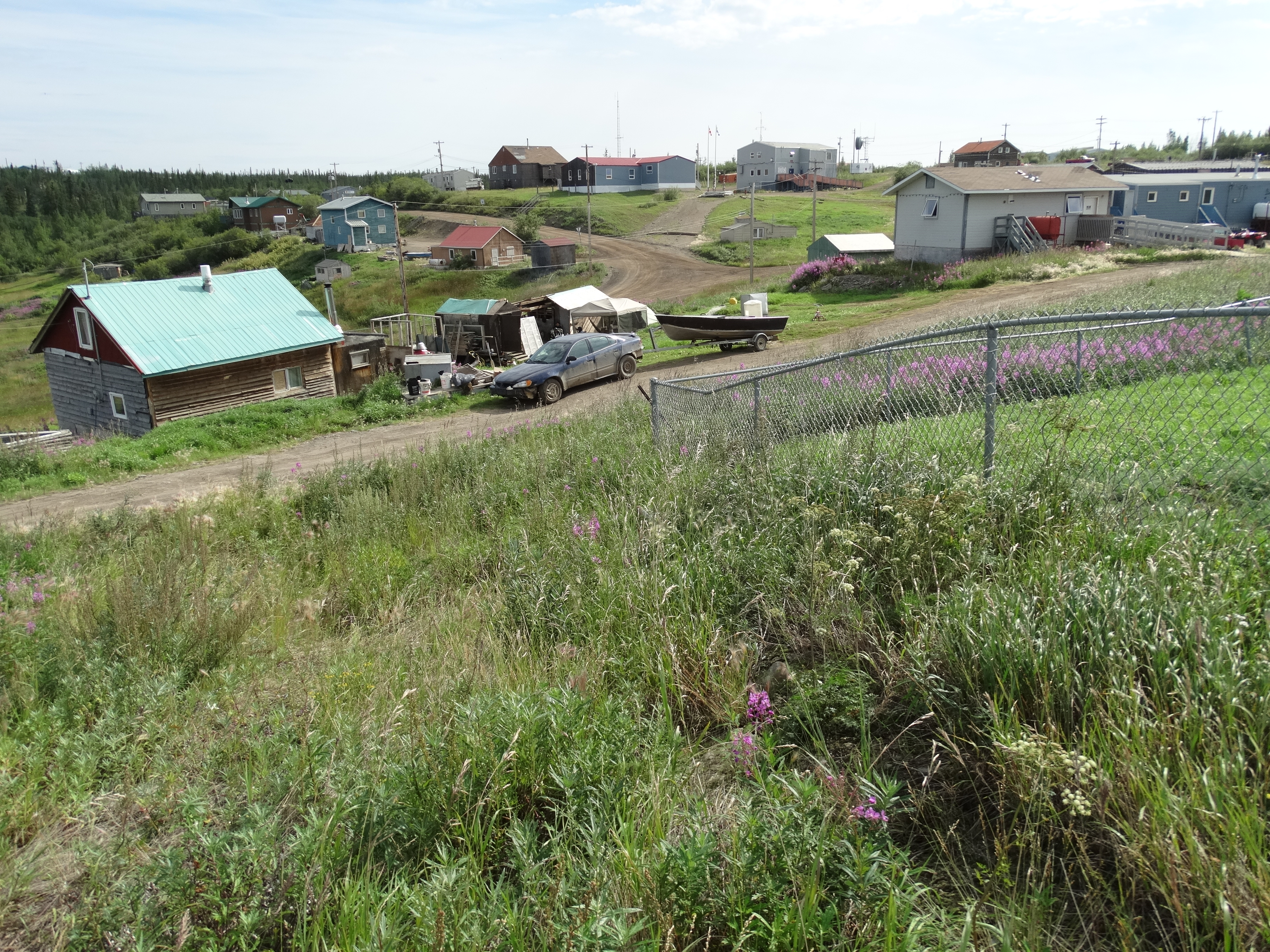
Tsiigehtchic (2006)

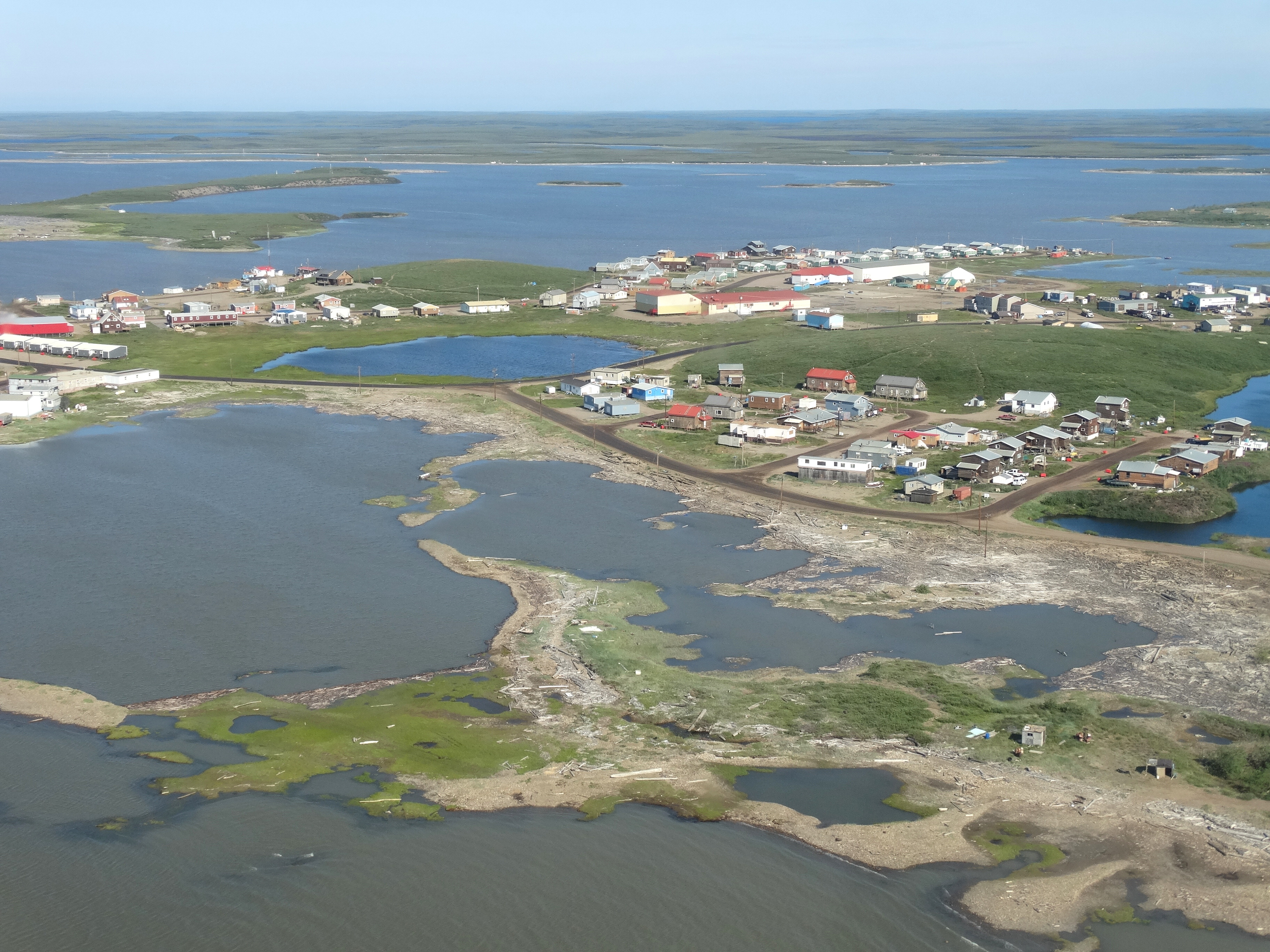
Tuktoyaktuk (2013)

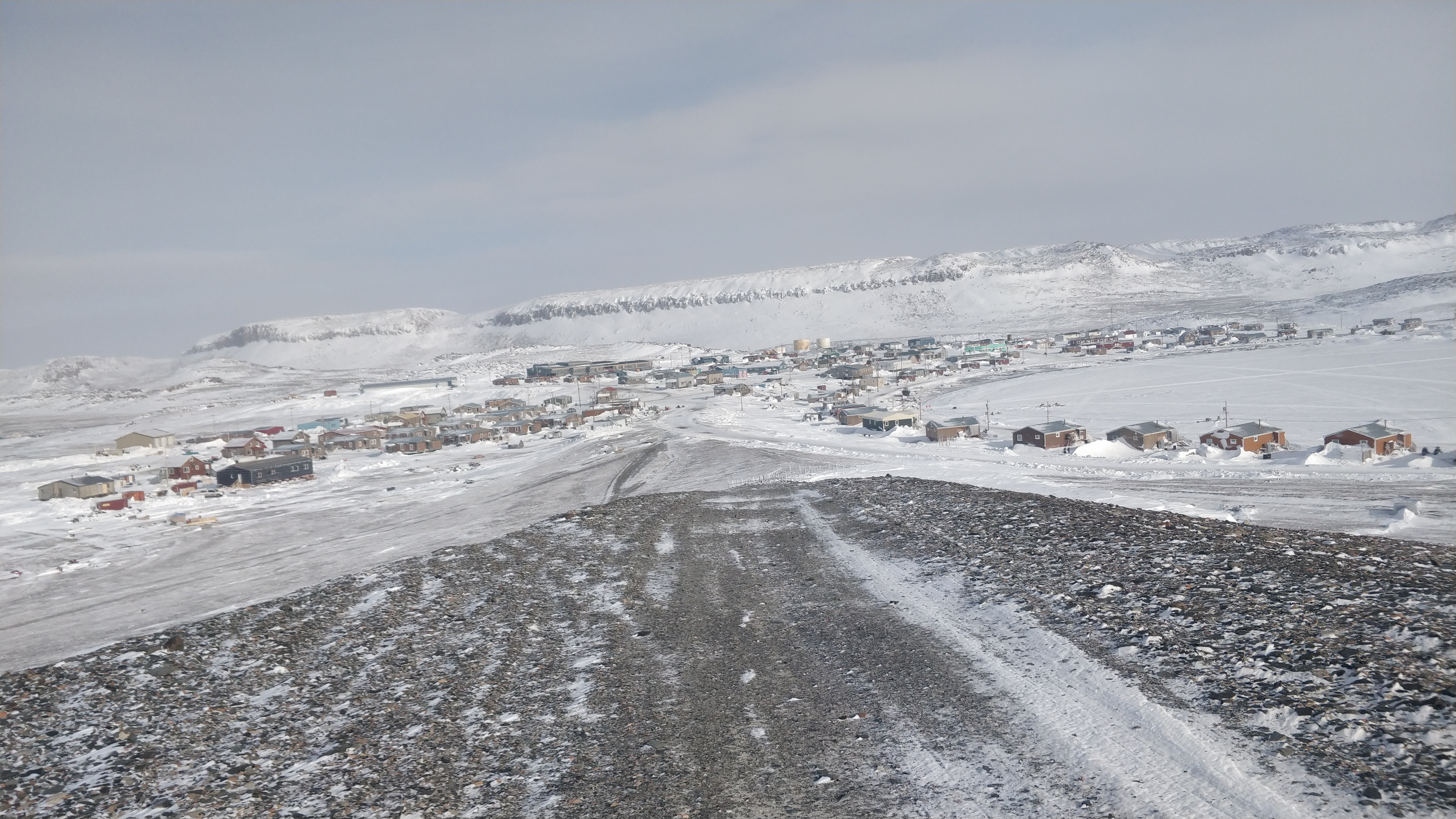
Ulukhaktok (2021)

== Climate ==
Climate data for Fort McPherson (Fort McPherson Airport) Climate ID: 2201601; coordinates 67°24′28″N 135°51′37″W; elevation: 35.4 m (116 ft); 1991–2020 normals, extremes 1892–present (Note: Climate data was recorded at Fort McPherson from October 1892 to June 1977 and at Fort McPherson Airport from August 1981 to present. Composite data from Fort McPherson A; Climate ID: 2201606; coordinates 67°24′25″N 135°31′35″W; elevation: 35.4 m (116 ft))
Month	Jan	Feb	Mar	Apr	May	Jun	Jul	Aug	Sep	Oct	Nov	Dec	Year
Record high humidex	9.0	7.6	11.5	15.7	28.3	38.8	35.0	40.4	27.0	24.1	5.0	4.6	40.4
Record high °C (°F)	6.1 (43.0)	10.0 (50.0)	11.8 (53.2)	16.7 (62.1)	29.5 (85.1)	32.0 (89.6)	33.3 (91.9)	33.0 (91.4)	27.2 (81.0)	24.1 (75.4)	10.0 (50.0)	9.0 (48.2)	33.3 (91.9)
Mean daily maximum °C (°F)	−23.2 (−9.8)	−21.0 (−5.8)	−14.0 (6.8)	−3.1 (26.4)	7.6 (45.7)	18.5 (65.3)	20.0 (68.0)	16.5 (61.7)	8.2 (46.8)	−3.3 (26.1)	−15.3 (4.5)	−21.4 (−6.5)	−2.5 (27.5)
Daily mean °C (°F)	−26.9 (−16.4)	−24.9 (−12.8)	−19.2 (−2.6)	−8.9 (16.0)	2.7 (36.9)	13.1 (55.6)	15.1 (59.2)	11.9 (53.4)	4.6 (40.3)	−6.6 (20.1)	−18.9 (−2.0)	−25.0 (−13.0)	−6.9 (19.6)
Mean daily minimum °C (°F)	−30.6 (−23.1)	−28.8 (−19.8)	−24.6 (−12.3)	−14.9 (5.2)	−2.4 (27.7)	7.7 (45.9)	10.2 (50.4)	7.3 (45.1)	1.1 (34.0)	−9.1 (15.6)	−22.3 (−8.1)	−28.8 (−19.8)	−11.3 (11.7)
Record low °C (°F)	−55.6 (−68.1)	−55.0 (−67.0)	−48.9 (−56.0)	−44.4 (−47.9)	−25.6 (−14.1)	−6.7 (19.9)	−1.1 (30.0)	−6.7 (19.9)	−19.5 (−3.1)	−37.5 (−35.5)	−46.7 (−52.1)	−50.6 (−59.1)	−55.6 (−68.1)
Record low wind chill	−58.9	−56.8	−54.4	−41.6	−32.6	−9.2	0.0	−4.8	−17.5	−40.2	−50.0	−59.7	−59.7
Average precipitation mm (inches)	13.6 (0.54)	12.8 (0.50)	13.2 (0.52)	8.1 (0.32)	14.1 (0.56)	27.8 (1.09)	48.6 (1.91)	38.2 (1.50)	38.7 (1.52)	34.8 (1.37)	27.3 (1.07)	17.0 (0.67)	294.3 (11.59)
Average rainfall mm (inches)	0.0 (0.0)	0.0 (0.0)	0.0 (0.0)	0.2 (0.01)	9.4 (0.37)	27.4 (1.08)	48.6 (1.91)	38.2 (1.50)	30.1 (1.19)	1.2 (0.05)	0.0 (0.0)	0.0 (0.0)	155.0 (6.10)
Average snowfall cm (inches)	13.6 (5.4)	12.8 (5.0)	13.2 (5.2)	7.9 (3.1)	4.7 (1.9)	0.2 (0.1)	0.0 (0.0)	0.1 (0.0)	8.1 (3.2)	33.7 (13.3)	27.3 (10.7)	17.0 (6.7)	138.7 (54.6)
Average precipitation days (≥ 0.2 mm)	5.5	4.7	6.0	3.7	5.2	7.1	10.7	11.2	12.1	10.7	8.7	6.8	92.5
Average rainy days (≥ 0.2 mm)	0.0	0.0	0.0	0.12	3.2	7.1	10.7	11.2	9.8	0.71	0.0	0.0	42.8
Average snowy days (≥ 0.2 cm)	5.5	4.7	6.0	3.6	2.0	0.12	0.0	0.05	2.6	10.1	8.7	6.8	50.2
Source: Environment and Climate Change Canada (January maximum / minimum) (February maximum / minimum) (March minimum) (April maximum / minimum) (May minimum) (June minimum) (July minimum) (August maximum / minimum) (September maximum) (November minimum) (December minimum)

Climate data for Inuvik (Inuvik (Mike Zubko) Airport) Climate ID: 2202570; coordinates 68°18′15″N 133°28′58″W; elevation: 67.7 m (222 ft); 1991–2020 normals, extremes 1957–present (Note: Includes composite data from Inuvik A: Climate ID: 2202571; coordinates 68°18′14″N 133°28′59″W; elevation: 67.7 m (222 ft) and Inuvik Climate / Inuvik UA; WMO ID: 71364 / 71957; 68°19′N 133°31′W; elevation: 103.0 m (337.9 ft) / 103.2 m (339 ft). Sunshine from 1951–1980)
Month	Jan	Feb	Mar	Apr	May	Jun	Jul	Aug	Sep	Oct	Nov	Dec	Year
Record high humidex	5.9	4.9	8.4	14.9	29.2	35.8	40.0	36.6	26.7	20.6	10.0	5.0	40.0
Record high °C (°F)	7.1 (44.8)	5.2 (41.4)	8.7 (47.7)	15.3 (59.5)	30.1 (86.2)	32.8 (91.0)	33.0 (91.4)	34.8 (94.6)	26.7 (80.1)	20.9 (69.6)	10.6 (51.1)	5.0 (41.0)	34.8 (94.6)
Mean daily maximum °C (°F)	−21.4 (−6.5)	−19.5 (−3.1)	−16.3 (2.7)	−5.6 (21.9)	6.3 (43.3)	17.5 (63.5)	19.3 (66.7)	15.4 (59.7)	7.9 (46.2)	−3.0 (26.6)	−14.3 (6.3)	−19.7 (−3.5)	−2.8 (27.0)
Daily mean °C (°F)	−24.9 (−12.8)	−23.5 (−10.3)	−21.1 (−6.0)	−10.6 (12.9)	1.5 (34.7)	11.6 (52.9)	14.2 (57.6)	10.9 (51.6)	4.4 (39.9)	−5.9 (21.4)	−17.6 (0.3)	−23.0 (−9.4)	−7.0 (19.4)
Mean daily minimum °C (°F)	−28.4 (−19.1)	−27.3 (−17.1)	−25.8 (−14.4)	−15.5 (4.1)	−3.3 (26.1)	5.7 (42.3)	9.0 (48.2)	6.4 (43.5)	0.8 (33.4)	−8.6 (16.5)	−20.8 (−5.4)	−26.4 (−15.5)	−11.2 (11.8)
Record low °C (°F)	−54.4 (−65.9)	−56.7 (−70.1)	−50.6 (−59.1)	−46.1 (−51.0)	−27.8 (−18.0)	−6.1 (21.0)	−3.3 (26.1)	−6.1 (21.0)	−20.1 (−4.2)	−35.0 (−31.0)	−46.1 (−51.0)	−50.0 (−58.0)	−56.7 (−70.1)
Record low wind chill	−64.1	−67.0	−59.6	−51.1	−35.2	−13.3	−5.2	−9.2	−23.4	−43.1	−55.0	−59.6	−67.0
Average precipitation mm (inches)	13.4 (0.53)	10.8 (0.43)	13.6 (0.54)	9.9 (0.39)	13.7 (0.54)	23.5 (0.93)	40.1 (1.58)	42.4 (1.67)	32.5 (1.28)	23.0 (0.91)	15.2 (0.60)	11.7 (0.46)	249.8 (9.83)
Average rainfall mm (inches)	—	0.0 (0.0)	0.0 (0.0)	0.3 (0.01)	6.0 (0.24)	—	31.8 (1.25)	36.0 (1.42)	17.7 (0.70)	1.1 (0.04)	0.3 (0.01)	0.0 (0.0)	—
Average snowfall cm (inches)	—	22.7 (8.9)	23.1 (9.1)	13.3 (5.2)	9.7 (3.8)	—	0.0 (0.0)	0.7 (0.3)	—	32.9 (13.0)	29.7 (11.7)	25.7 (10.1)	—
Average precipitation days (≥ 0.2 mm)	10.8	10.2	11.9	8.0	8.1	8.9	12.8	14.8	13.9	14.8	14.1	11.2	139.5
Average rainy days (≥ 0.2 mm)	—	0.1	0.0	0.1	2.7	—	9.6	13.0	8.9	0.9	0.2	0.2	—
Average snowy days (≥ 0.2 cm)	—	11.6	11.9	5.6	4.2	—	0.1	0.6	—	11.5	12.3	10.9	—
Average relative humidity (%) (at 1500 LST)	68.7	66.6	58.5	57.5	57.9	49.7	57.2	64.1	70.1	79.4	76.6	71.2	64.8
Mean monthly sunshine hours	7.3	65.2	174.1	248.7	295.0	375.1	339.8	216.2	109.4	50.2	17.8	0.0	1,898.8
Source: Environment and Climate Change Canada (January maximum) (April maximum) (May maximum) (July maximum) (August maximum) (sunshine)

Climate data for Sachs Harbour (Sachs Harbour (David Nasogaluak Jr. Saaryuaq) Airport} Climate ID: 2503650; coordinates 72°00′N 125°16′W; elevation: 86.3 m (283 ft); 1991–2020 normals, extremes 1955−present (Note: Composite data from Sachs Harbour A; Climate ID: 2503649; coordinates 72°59′37″N 125°14′29″W; elevation: 86.3 m (283 ft) and Sachs Harbour Climate; Climate ID: 2503648; coordinates 72°59′33″N 125°15′15″W; elevation: 87.5 m (287 ft). Sunshine from 1951–1980)
Month	Jan	Feb	Mar	Apr	May	Jun	Jul	Aug	Sep	Oct	Nov	Dec	Year
Record high humidex	15.0	−6.1	−3.2	2.6	9.4	22.1	31.9	26.0	15.9	3.9	1.1	−4.0	31.9
Record high °C (°F)	−4.4 (24.1)	−4.5 (23.9)	−3.2 (26.2)	5.4 (41.7)	10.0 (50.0)	20.5 (68.9)	24.2 (75.6)	23.2 (73.8)	15.6 (60.1)	4.4 (39.9)	1.7 (35.1)	−4.0 (24.8)	24.2 (75.6)
Mean daily maximum °C (°F)	−23.8 (−10.8)	−24.4 (−11.9)	−22.8 (−9.0)	−13.6 (7.5)	−3.6 (25.5)	6.3 (43.3)	9.8 (49.6)	7.2 (45.0)	1.5 (34.7)	−6.5 (20.3)	−15.3 (4.5)	−21.7 (−7.1)	−8.9 (16.0)
Daily mean °C (°F)	−27.4 (−17.3)	−27.8 (−18.0)	−26.4 (−15.5)	−17.2 (1.0)	−6.6 (20.1)	3.4 (38.1)	6.5 (43.7)	4.4 (39.9)	−0.6 (30.9)	−9.3 (15.3)	−18.6 (−1.5)	−25.1 (−13.2)	−12.1 (10.2)
Mean daily minimum °C (°F)	−31.0 (−23.8)	−31.2 (−24.2)	−29.9 (−21.8)	−20.8 (−5.4)	−9.4 (15.1)	0.4 (32.7)	3.3 (37.9)	1.5 (34.7)	−2.8 (27.0)	−12.2 (10.0)	−22.1 (−7.8)	−28.5 (−19.3)	−15.2 (4.6)
Record low °C (°F)	−52.2 (−62.0)	−50.2 (−58.4)	−48.4 (−55.1)	−43.0 (−45.4)	−26.7 (−16.1)	−16.5 (2.3)	−5.0 (23.0)	−11.0 (12.2)	−22.8 (−9.0)	−35.5 (−31.9)	−42.8 (−45.0)	−45.0 (−49.0)	−52.2 (−62.0)
Record low wind chill	−71.6	−68.1	−66.1	−58.4	−40.3	−22.1	−10.3	−16.0	−31.2	−44.9	−55.5	−64.1	−71.6
Average precipitation mm (inches)	5.8 (0.23)	5.3 (0.21)	8.5 (0.33)	9.4 (0.37)	6.7 (0.26)	9.4 (0.37)	14.2 (0.56)	25.5 (1.00)	21.2 (0.83)	17.7 (0.70)	9.5 (0.37)	6.6 (0.26)	139.7 (5.50)
Average rainfall mm (inches)	0.0 (0.0)	0.0 (0.0)	0.0 (0.0)	0.0 (0.0)	0.2 (0.01)	4.5 (0.18)	13.6 (0.54)	—	9.1 (0.36)	—	0.0 (0.0)	0.0 (0.0)	—
Average snowfall cm (inches)	6.0 (2.4)	6.5 (2.6)	—	7.7 (3.0)	—	2.2 (0.9)	0.3 (0.1)	3.1 (1.2)	10.6 (4.2)	—	—	—	—
Average precipitation days (≥ 0.2 mm)	8.9	6.2	8.7	7.5	7.9	5.7	7.7	13.8	13.7	14.3	11.2	7.8	113.2
Average rainy days (≥ 0.2 mm)	0.0	0.0	0.0	0.0	0.4	3.1	6.8	—	5.6	—	0.0	0.0	—
Average snowy days (≥ 0.2 cm)	8.2	6.2	—	6.2	—	1.4	0.4	3.0	7.4	—	—	—	—
Average relative humidity (%) (at 1500 LST)	78.4	77.3	79.1	82.2	83.4	80.6	78.2	84.3	87.2	89.5	85.4	80.7	82.2
Mean monthly sunshine hours	0.1	42.6	165.8	264.8	284.6	330.6	335.7	189.8	79.7	38.7	4.3	0.0	1,736.7
Source: Environment and Climate Change Canada Canadian Climate Normals 1991-2020 (sunshine)
