= Census geographic units of Canada =

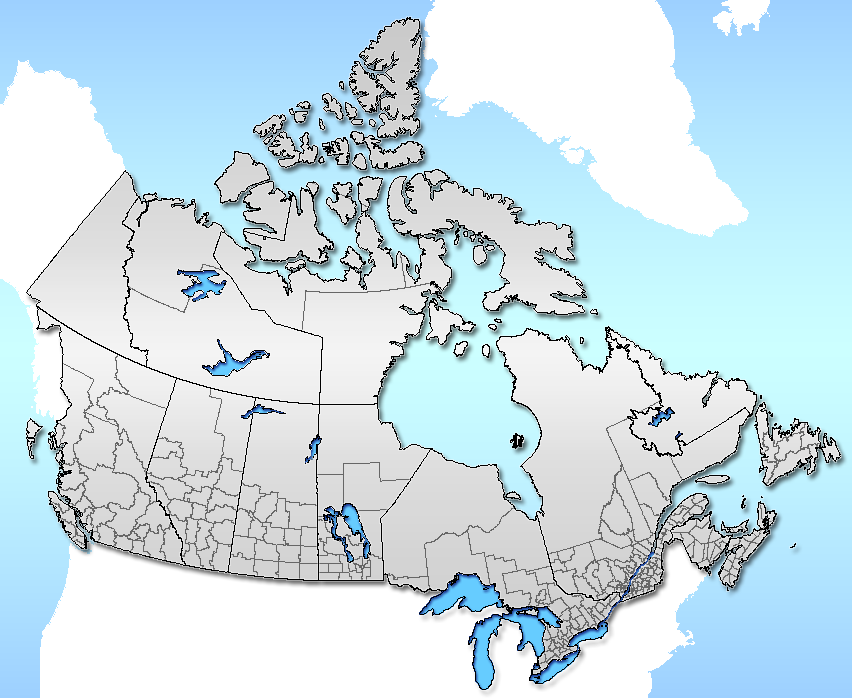
Census divisions by province and territory

The census geographic units of Canada are the census subdivisions defined and used by Canada's federal government statistics bureau Statistics Canada to conduct the country's quinquennial census. These areas exist solely for the purposes of statistical analysis and presentation; they have no government of their own. They exist on four levels: the top-level (first-level) divisions are Canada's provinces and territories; these are divided into second-level census divisions, which in turn are divided into third-level census subdivisions (often corresponding to municipalities) and fourth-level dissemination areas.

In some provinces, census divisions correspond to the province's second-level administrative divisions such as a county or another similar unit of political organization. In the prairie provinces, census divisions do not correspond to the province's administrative divisions, but rather group multiple administrative divisions together. In Newfoundland and Labrador, the boundaries are set by Statistics Canada as no such level of government exists. Two of Canada's three territories are also divided into census divisions.

== Census divisions ==
According to Statistics Canada, Census divisions "are intermediate geographic areas between the province/territory level and the municipality (census subdivision)." In six provinces, they are legislated groupings of adjacent census subdivisions (municipalities or municipal equivalents) that share in regional planning and management of certain services such as emergency response. In four provinces and all three territories, legislation for equivalent intermediate geographic areas do not exist. Statistics Canada therefore collaborates with the four provinces and three territories in the creation of statistical equivalents. Classifications of census divisions includes county, district, district municipality, region, regional county municipality, regional district, regional municipality, territory, territory equivalent, united counties, and simply census divisions.

Canada's census divisions by province or territory
Province/territory	Census division types	Quantity
Alberta	Census divisions	19
British Columbia	Region	1
British Columbia	Regional districts	28
Manitoba	Census divisions	23
New Brunswick	Counties	15
Newfoundland and Labrador	Census divisions	11
Northwest Territories	Regions	6
Nova Scotia	Counties	18
Nunavut	Regions	3
Ontario	Census divisions	9
Ontario	Counties	20
Ontario	Districts	10
Ontario	District municipality	1
Ontario	Regional municipalities	6
Ontario	United counties	3
Prince Edward Island	Counties	3
Quebec	Census divisions	5
Quebec	Regional county municipalities	81
Quebec	Territory equivalents	12
Saskatchewan	Census divisions	18
Yukon	Territory	1

== Census consolidated subdivisions ==
A census consolidated subdivision is a geographic unit between census division and census subdivision. It is a combination of adjacent census subdivisions typically consisting of larger, more rural census subdivisions and smaller, more densely populated census subdivisions.

== Census subdivisions ==
Census subdivisions generally correspond to the municipalities of Canada, as determined by provincial and territorial legislation. They can also correspond to area which are deemed to be equivalents to municipalities for statistical reporting purposes, such as Indian reserves, Indian settlements, and unorganized territories where municipal level government may not exist. Statistics Canada has created census subdivisions in cooperation with the provinces of British Columbia, Newfoundland and Labrador, and Nova Scotia as equivalents for municipalities. The Indian reserve and Indian settlement census subdivisions are determined according to criteria established by Indigenous and Northern Affairs Canada.

== Dissemination areas ==
Dissemination areas are the second-smallest standard geographic unit in Canada and cover the entire country. As small areas, they comprise one or more dissemination blocks and have a population between 400 and 700 people.

== Dissemination blocks ==
Dissemination blocks are the smallest standard geographic unit in Canada and cover the entire country. They are areas surrounded by roads and/or higher census geographic units.

== Specially-defined geographic units ==
=== Census metropolitan areas ===
A "census metropolitan area" (CMA) is a grouping of census subdivisions comprising a large urban area (the "urban core") and those surrounding "urban fringes" with which it is closely integrated. To become a CMA, an area must register an urban core population of at least 100,000 at the previous census. CMA status is retained even if this core population later drops below 100,000.

CMAs may cross census division and therefore provincial boundaries, although the Ottawa-Gatineau metropolitan area in Ontario and Quebec is the only one that currently crosses a provincial border.

The methodology used by Statistics Canada does not allow for CMA-CMA mergers into larger statistical areas; consequently, there is no Canadian equivalent to the combined statistical areas of the United States. Statistics Canada has stated that Toronto, Oshawa and Hamilton could be merged into a single CSA were such an approach utilized. Statistics Canada has described the Greater Golden Horseshoe as the country's largest urban area.

=== Census agglomerations ===
A "census agglomeration" (CA) is a smaller version of a CMA in which the urban core population at the previous census was greater than 10,000 but less than 100,000. If the population of an urban core is less than 50,000, it is the starting point for the construction of a 'census agglomeration'.

=== Census tracts ===
CMAs and CAs with a population greater than 50,000 are subdivided into census tracts which have populations ranging from 2,500 to 8,000.

=== Population centres ===
A population centre (PC), formerly known as an urban area (UA), is any grouping of contiguous dissemination areas that has a minimum population of 1,000 and an average population density of 400 persons per square kilometre or greater. For the 2011 census, urban area was renamed "population centre". In 2011, Statistics Canada identified 942 population centres in Canada. Some population centres cross municipal boundaries and not all municipalities contain a population centre while others have more than one.

The population centre level of geography is further divided into the following three groupings based on population:

- "small population centre" – 1,000 to 29,999
- "medium population centre" – 30,000 to 99,999
- "large urban population centre" – 100,000 and greater

=== Designated places ===
A "designated place" (DPL) is usually a small community that does not meet the criteria used to define incorporated municipalities or urban areas (areas with a population of at least 1,000 and no fewer than 400 persons per square kilometre), but for which Statistics Canada or a provincial government has requested that similar demographic data be compiled.

=== Localities ===
A "locality" (LOC) is a historical named location or place. The named location may be a former census subdivision, a former urban area, or a former designated place. It may also refer to neighbourhoods, post offices, communities and unincorporated places among other entities.

=== Electoral districts ===
Statistics Canada also aggregates data by federal electoral districts, one purpose for which is the redrawing of district boundaries every ten years. Federal electoral districts are numerically indexed; each district receives a unique five-digit code, with the first two digits being the Standard Geographical Classification code for the province or territory in which the district is located.

== See also ==
- Census division statistics of Canada
- Census divisions of Alberta, Newfoundland and Labrador, Ontario, Saskatchewan
- Counties of New Brunswick, Nova Scotia, Prince Edward Island
- Regions of Manitoba, Northwest Territories, Nunavut
- Regional county municipalities of Quebec
- Regional districts of British Columbia
