= Indigenous peoples in Northern Canada =

The Indigenous peoples in Northern Canada consist of the First Nations, Métis, and Inuit located in Canada's three territories: Northwest Territories, Nunavut, and Yukon.

== Northwest Territories ==
Indigenous peoples in the Northwest Territories
Community
Governance				Name	
Indigenous peoples	First Nations, Inuit or Métis organization	Band / Nation / Region	Territorial region	Official	Traditional
Chipewyan	Akaitcho Territory Government	Deninu Kųę́ First Nation	South Slave	Fort Resolution	Denı́nu Kų́ę́
Chipewyan	Akaitcho Territory Government	Łutsël K'é Dene First Nation	North Slave	Łutselk'e	Łútsę̀lk'é
Chipewyan	Akaitcho Territory Government	Smith's Landing First Nation	South Slave	Fort Smith	Tthebacha
Chipewyan / Cree	Akaitcho Territory Government	Salt River First Nation	South Slave	Fort Smith	Tthebacha
Gwichʼin	Gwich'in Tribal Council	Aklavik First Nation (Ehdiitat Gwich'in Council)	Inuvik	Aklavik	Akłarvik
Gwichʼin	Gwich'in Tribal Council	Gwichya Gwich'in First Nation (Gwichya Gwich'in Council)	Inuvik	Tsiigehtchic	Tsiigehtshik
Gwichʼin	Gwich'in Tribal Council	Inuvik Native Band (Nihtat Gwich'in Council)	Inuvik	Inuvik	Inuuvik
Gwichʼin	Gwich'in Tribal Council	Tetlit Gwich'in First Nation (Tetlin Gwich'in Council)	Inuvik	Fort McPherson	Teetł'it Zheh
Inuit	Inuvialuit Regional Corporation	Inuvialuit Settlement Region	Inuvik	Aklavik	Akłarvik
Inuit	Inuvialuit Regional Corporation	Inuvialuit Settlement Region	Inuvik	Inuvik	Inuuvik
Inuit	Inuvialuit Regional Corporation	Inuvialuit Settlement Region	Inuvik	Paulatuk	Paulatuuq
Inuit	Inuvialuit Regional Corporation	Inuvialuit Settlement Region	Inuvik	Sachs Harbour	Ikaahuk
Inuit	Inuvialuit Regional Corporation	Inuvialuit Settlement Region	Inuvik	Tuktoyaktuk	Tuktuujaqrtuuq
Inuit	Inuvialuit Regional Corporation	Inuvialuit Settlement Region	Inuvik	Ulukhaktok	Ulukhaqtuuq
Métis	Dehcho First Nations	Fort Providence Métis Council	South Slave	Fort Providence	Zhahti Kų́ę́
Métis	Dehcho First Nations	Fort Simpson Métis Nation	Dehcho	Fort Simpson	Łı́ı́dlı̨ Kų́ę́
Métis	North Slave Métis Alliance	Behchokǫ̀ Métis	North Slave	Behchokǫ̀	
Métis	North Slave Métis Alliance	Gamèti Métis	South Slave	Gamèti	Gahmı̨̀tı̀
Métis	North Slave Métis Alliance	Wekweeti Métis	South Slave	Wekweètì	
Métis	North Slave Métis Alliance	Whatì Métis	South Slave	Whatì	
Métis	Northwest Territory Métis Nation	Fort Resolution Métis Government	South Slave	Fort Resolution	Denı́nu Kų́ę́
Métis	Northwest Territory Métis Nation	Fort Smith Métis Council	South Slave	Fort Smith	Tthebacha
Métis	Northwest Territory Métis Nation	Hay River Métis Government Council	South Slave	Hay River	Xátł'odehchee
Sahtu	Sahtu Dene Council	Behdzi Ahda' First Nation	Sahtu	Colville Lake	K'áhbamı̨́túé
Sahtu	Sahtu Dene Council	Délı̨nę First Nation	Sahtu	Délı̨nę	
Sahtu	Sahtu Dene Council	Fort Good Hope First Nation	Sahtu	Fort Good Hope	Rádeyı̨lı̨kóé
Sahtu	Sahtu Dene Council	Tulita Dene First Nation	Sahtu	Tulita	Tulı́t’a
Slavey	Dehcho First Nations	Acho Dene Koe First Nation	Dehcho	Fort Liard	Echaot'ı̨e Kų́ę́
Slavey	Dehcho First Nations	Deh Gáh Got'ı̨ę First Nation	South Slave	Fort Providence	Zhahti Kų́ę́
Slavey	Dehcho First Nations	K'atl'odeeche First Nation	South Slave	Hay River Reserve	Xátł'odehchee
Slavey	Dehcho First Nations	Jean Marie River First Nation	Dehcho	Jean Marie River	Tthek'éhdélı̨
Slavey	Dehcho First Nations	Ka'a'gee Tu First Nation	South Slave	Kakisa	K'ágee
Slavey	Dehcho First Nations	Łı́ı́dlı̨ı̨ Kų́ę́ First Nation	Dehcho	Fort Simpson	Łı́ı́dlı̨ Kų́ę́
Slavey	Dehcho First Nations	Nahɂą Dehé Dene Band	Dehcho	Nahanni Butte	
Slavey	Dehcho First Nations	Pehdzeh Ki First Nation	Dehcho	Wrigley	Tthenáágó
Slavey	Dehcho First Nations	Sambaa K'e First Nation	Dehcho	Sambaa K'e	Sambaa K’e
Slavey	Dehcho First Nations	West Point First Nation	South Slave	Hay River	Xátł'odehchee
Tłı̨chǫ	Tłı̨chǫ Government	Dechi Laot'i First Nations	North Slave	Wekweètì	
Tłı̨chǫ	Tłı̨chǫ Government	Dog Rib Rae First Nation	North Slave	Behchokǫ̀	
Tłı̨chǫ	Tłı̨chǫ Government	Gameti First Nation	North Slave	Gamèti	Gahmı̨̀tı̀
Tłı̨chǫ	Tłı̨chǫ Government	Wha Ti First Nation	North Slave	Whatì	
Yellowknives	Akaitcho Territory Government	Yellowknives Dene First Nation	North Slave	Dettah	T'èɂehda
Yellowknives	Akaitcho Territory Government	Yellowknives Dene First Nation	North Slave	Ndilǫ	

== Nunavut ==
All communities in Nunavut are Inuit. There are no First Nations or Métis.

Indigenous peoples in Nunavut
Community^{a}
Governance			Name	
Indigenous peoples	Community type	Territorial region	Official	Traditional / Inuktitut syllabics^{b}
Inuit	Settlement	Kitikmeot	Bathurst Inlet	Kingoak
Inuit	Hamlet	Kitikmeot	Cambridge Bay	Iqaluktuuttiaq, ᐃᖃᓗᒃᑑᑦᑎᐊᖅ
Inuit	Hamlet	Kitikmeot	Gjoa Haven	Urhuqtuuq, ᐅᖅᓱᖅᑑᖅ
Inuit	Hamlet	Kitikmeot	Kugaaruk	ᑰᒑᕐᔪᒃ
Inuit	Hamlet	Kitikmeot	Kugluktuk	ᖁᕐᓗᖅᑑᖅ
Inuit	Hamlet	Kitikmeot	Taloyoak	ᑕᓗᕐᔪᐊᖅ
Inuit	Settlement	Kitikmeot	Umingmaktok	
Inuit	Hamlet	Kivalliq	Arviat	ᐊᕐᕕᐊᑦ
Inuit	Hamlet	Kivalliq	Baker Lake	Qamani’tuuq, ᖃᒪᓂᑦᑐᐊᖅ
Inuit	Hamlet	Kivalliq	Chesterfield Inlet	Igluligaarjuk, ᐃᒡᓗᓕᒑᕐᔪᒃ
Inuit	Hamlet	Kivalliq	Coral Harbour	Salliq, ᓴᓪᓕᖅ
Inuit	Hamlet	Kivalliq	Naujaat	ᓇᐅᔮᑦ
Inuit	Hamlet	Kivalliq	Rankin Inlet	Kangiqtiniq, ᑲᖏᖅᖠᓂᖅ or Kangiqiniq, ᑲᖏᕿᓂᖅ
Inuit	Hamlet	Kivalliq	Whale Cove	Tikiraqjuaq, ᑎᑭᕋᕐᔪᐊᖅ
Inuit	Hamlet	Qikiqtaaluk	Arctic Bay	Ikpiarjuk, ᐃᒃᐱᐊᕐᔪᒃ
Inuit	Hamlet	Qikiqtaaluk	Clyde River	Kangiqtugaapik, ᑲᖏᖅᑐᒑᐱᒃ
Inuit	Hamlet	Qikiqtaaluk	Grise Fiord	Aujuittuq, ᐊᐅᓱᐃᑦᑐᖅ
Inuit	Hamlet	Qikiqtaaluk	Igloolik	ᐃᒡᓗᓕᒃ
Inuit	City	Qikiqtaaluk	Iqaluit (territorial capital)	ᐃᖃᓗᐃᑦ
Inuit	Hamlet	Qikiqtaaluk	Kimmirut	ᑭᒻᒥᕈᑦ
Inuit	Hamlet	Qikiqtaaluk	Kinngait	ᑭᙵᐃᑦ
Inuit	Settlement	Qikiqtaaluk	Nanisivik	ᓇᓂᓯᕕᒃ
Inuit	Hamlet	Qikiqtaaluk	Pangnirtung	ᐸᓐᓂᖅᑑᖅ
Inuit	Hamlet	Qikiqtaaluk	Pond Inlet	Mitimatalik, ᒥᑦᑎᒪᑕᓕᒃ
Inuit	Hamlet	Qikiqtaaluk	Qikiqtarjuaq	ᕿᑭᖅᑕᕐᔪᐊᖅ
Inuit	Hamlet	Qikiqtaaluk	Resolute	Qausuittuq, ᖃᐅᓱᐃᑦᑐᖅ
Inuit	Hamlet	Qikiqtaaluk	Sanikiluaq,	ᓴᓂᑭᓗᐊᖅ
Inuit	Hamlet	Qikiqtaaluk	Sanirajak	ᓴᓂᕋᔭᒃ

=== Notes ===
- ^a Bathurst Inlet, Nanisivik, and Umingmaktok are not listed as official communities by the Government of Nunavut, but are listed as settlements by Statistics Canada.
- ^b Inuktitut syllabics are not normally used in Cambridge Bay and Kugluktuk.

== Yukon ==
=== Gwichʼin ===
- Vuntut Gwitchin First Nation

=== Hän ===
- Trʼondëk Hwëchʼin First Nation

=== Kaska Dena ===
- Liard First Nation
- Ross River Dena Council

=== Northern Tutchone ===
- First Nation of Na-Cho Nyäk Dun
- Little Salmon/Carmacks First Nation
- Selkirk First Nation
- White River First Nation

=== Southern Tutchone ===
- Champagne and Aishihik First Nations
- Kluane First Nation
- Kwanlin Dün First Nation
- Ta'an Kwach'an Council

=== Tagish ===
- Carcross/Tagish First Nation
- Kwanlin Dün First Nation
- Ta'an Kwach'an Council

=== Tlingit ===
- Carcross/Tagish First Nation
- Kwanlin Dün First Nation
- Ta'an Kwach'an Council
- Teslin Tlingit Council

=== Upper Tanana ===
- White River First Nation

== See also ==
- Indigenous peoples in Yukon
- List of Indigenous peoples
