= Tribal council (Canada) =

Alliances of band governments of Canadian First Nations

A tribal council is an association of First Nations bands in Canada, generally along regional, ethnic or linguistic lines.

An Indian band, usually consisting of one main community, is the fundamental unit of government for First Nations in Canada. Bands may unite to form a tribal council, but they need not do so. Bands that do not belong to a tribal council are said to be independent. Bands may and do withdraw from tribal councils. Furthermore, the authority that bands delegate to their tribal council varies, with some tribal councils serving as a strong, central organization while others are granted limited power by their members.

Nunavut and Newfoundland and Labrador do not have any tribal councils.

== Tribal councils in Canada ==
=== Alberta ===
As of 2019, Alberta has ten tribal councils:

- Athabasca Tribal Council — Athabasca Chipewyan, Chipewyan Prairie, Fort McKay, and Fort McMurray #468
- Blackfoot Confederacy — Blood (a.k.a. Kainai), Piikani, and Siksika
- Kee Tas Kee Now Tribal Council — Loon River Cree, Lubicon Lake, Peerless Trout, Whitefish Lake, and Woodland Cree
- Lesser Slave Lake Indian Regional Council — Driftpile Cree, Kapawe'no, Sawridge, Sucker Creek, and Swan River
- Maskwacis Cree Tribal Council — Ermineskin Tribe, Louis Bull, Montana, and Samson
- North Peace Tribal Council — Beaver, Dene Tha', Little Red River Cree, and Tallcree Tribal Government
- Stoney-Nakoda - Tsuut'ina Tribal Council — Chiniki and Tsuut'ina Nation
- Tribal Chiefs Ventures — Beaver Lake Cree, Cold Lake, Frog Lake, Heart Lake, and Kehewin Cree
- Western Cree Tribal Council — Duncan's, Horse Lake, and Sturgeon Lake Cree
- Yellowhead Tribal Council — Alexander, Alexis Nakota Sioux, O'Chiese, and Sunchild

=== British Columbia ===
- Northern Shuswap Tribal Council (a.k.a. Cariboo Tribal Council)
- Carrier Chilcotin Tribal Council
- Carrier Sekani Tribal Council
- Kaska Tribal Council
- Kwakiutl District Council
- Lillooet Tribal Council (a.k.a. St'at'imc Nation, but does not include all St'at'imc)
- Lower Stl'atl'imx Tribal Council (formerly In-SHUCK-ch) — Douglas, Lil'wat, N'Quatqua, Samahquam, and Skatin
- Musgamagw Tsawataineuk Tribal Council
- Naut'sa mawt Tribal Council
- Nicola Tribal Association — Nlaka'pamux and Okanagan
- Nisga'a Tribal Council
- Nlaka'pamux Nation Tribal Council (does not include all Nlaka'pamux)
- Northern Shuswap Tribal Council
- Nuu-chah-nulth Tribal Council
- Office of the Wet'suwet'en
- Okanagan Nation Alliance (includes Colville Reservation in US)
- Shuswap Nation Tribal Council
- Sto:lo Nation
- Stó:lō Tribal Council
- Tsilhqot'in National Government
- Treaty 8 Tribal Association (northeastern BC)

==== Defunct ====
- Fraser Canyon Indian Administration — Nlaka'pamux
- Tsimshian Tribal Council

=== Manitoba ===
As of 2021, Manitoba has seven tribal councils:

- Dakota Ojibway Tribal Council — Birdtail Sioux, Dakota Tipi, Long Plain, Roseau River Anishnabe, Sandy Bay Ojibway, Swan Lake, and Waywayseecappo
- Interlake Reserves Tribal Council — Dauphin River, Kinonjeoshtegon, Lake Manitoba, Little Saskatchewan, Peguis, and Pinaymootang
- Island Lake Tribal Council — Garden Hill, Red Sucker, St. Theresa Point, and Wasagamack
- Keewatin Tribal Council — Barren Lands, Bunibonibee Cree, Fox Lake Cree, God's Lake, Manto Sipi Cree, Northlands Denesuline, Sayisi Dene, Shamattawa, Tataskweyak Cree, War Lake, and York Factory
- Southeast Resource Development Council — Berens River, Black River, Bloodvein, Brokenhead, Hollow Water, Little Grand Rapids, Pauingassi, and Poplar River (and formerly Buffalo Point)
- Swampy Cree Tribal Council — Chemawawin Cree, Mathias Colomb, Misipawistik Cree, Mosakahiken Cree, Opaskwayak Cree, Sapotaweyak Cree, and Wuskwi Sipihk
- West Region Tribal Council — Ebb and Flow, Gambler, Keeseekoowenin, O-Chi-Chak-Ko-Sipi, Pine Creek, Rolling River, Skownan, and Tootinaowaziibeeng Treaty Reserve

Manitoba Keewatinook Ininew Okimowin (MKO), though not a tribal council, represents citizens of 26 First Nations who are signatories to Treaties 4, 5, 6, and 10.

=== Northwest Territories ===
As of 2019, the Northwest Territories has five tribal councils:

- Akaitcho Territory Government — Deninu Kųę́, Łutsël K'é Dene, Salt River, and Yellowknives Dene
- Dehcho First Nations — Acho Dene Koe, Deh Gáh Got'ı̨ę, Jean Marie River, K'atlodeeche, Ka'a'gee Tu, Łı́ı́dlı̨ı̨ Kų́ę́, Nahanni Butte, Pehdzeh Ki, Sambaa K'e, and West Point
- Gwich'in Tribal Council — Aklavik, Gwichya Gwich'in, Inuvik Native, and Teetl'it Gwich'in Band Council
- Sahtu Dene Council — Behdzi Ahda', Délı̨nę, Fort Good Hope, and Tulita Dene
- Tetlit Gwich'in Council DGO

=== Atlantic Canada ===
As of 2019, Atlantic Canada has a collective total of nine tribal councils, with Newfoundland and Labrador having no tribal councils at all.

==== New Brunswick ====
- Mawiw Council — Elsipogtog, Esgenoopetitj, and Tobique
- North Shore Micmac District Council — Buctouche MicMac, Eel Ground, Eel River Bar, Fort Folly, Indian Island, Metepenagiag Mi'kmaq Nation, and Pabineau
- Sickadomec First Nation Inc.
- Wolastoqey Tribal Council — Kingsclear, Madawaska Maliseet, Oromocto, St. Mary's
- The New Brunswick Aboriginal Peoples Council (NBAPC), though not a tribal council, represents 28,260 status and non-status Aboriginal People in New Brunswick.

==== Nova Scotia ====
- Confederacy of Mainland Mi'kmaq — Acadia, Annapolis Valley, Bear River, Glooscap, Millbrook, Paqꞌtnkek, Pictou Landing, and Sipekneꞌkatik
- Union of Nova Scotia Mi'kmaq — Eskasoni, Membertou, Potlotek, Wagmatcook, and We'koqma'q

==== Prince Edward Island ====
- Epekwitk Assembly of Councils — Abegweit and Lennox Island
- Mi'kmaq Confederacy of Prince Edward Island
- Pekwitk Assembly of Councils

=== Ontario ===
As of 2019, Ontario has sixteen tribal councils:

- Anishinabeg of Kabapikotawangag Resource Council
- Bimose Tribal Council
- Independent First Nations Alliance
- Keewaytinook Okimakanak Council
- Mamaweswen, The North Shore Tribal Council
- Matawa First Nations Management
- Mushkegowuk Council
- Nokiiwin Tribal Council
- Ogemawahj Tribal Council
- Pwi-Di-Goo-Zing Ne-Yaa-Zhing Advisory Services
- Shibogama First Nations Council
- Southern First Nation Secretariat
- United Chiefs & Councils of Mnidoo Mnising
- Waabnoong Bemjiwang Association of First Nations
- Wabun Tribal Council
- Windigo First Nations Council

=== Quebec ===
As of 2019, Quebec has seven tribal councils (First Nations listed in English):

- Algonquin Anishinabeg Nation Tribal Council — Abitibiwinni, Kebaowek, Kitcisakik Anicinape, Kitigan Zibi Anishinabeg, Long Point, and Anishnabe Nation of Lac Simon
- Algonquin Nation Programs and Services Secretariat — Algonquins of Barriere Lake, Timiskaming, and Wolf Lake
- Atikamekw Sipi - Conseil de la Nation Atikamekw —Atikamekw of Manawan, Atikamekw of Opitciwan, and Wemotaci Atikamekw
- Conseil Tribal Mamuitun — Innu Takuaikan Uashat Mak Mani-Utenam, Innue Essipit, Innu Nation of Matimekush-Lac John, Pessamit Innu, and Pekuakamiulnuatsh
- Grand Conseil de la Nation Waban-Aki — Odanak and Wôlinak
- Mi'gmawei Mawiomi Secretariat — Listuguj Mi'gmaq, Micmacs of Gesgapegiag, Micmacs of Gespeg
- Regroupement Mamit Innuat — Innus of Ekuanitshit, Montagnais of Pakua Shipi, Montagnais of Unamen Shipu, and Innus of Nutashkuan
- Grand Council of the Crees is not a tribal council in the same sense of the above, but serves a similar purpose. Its powers are not delegated from member communities but are derived from the 1975 James Bay and Northern Quebec Agreement and subsequent agreements with Canada and Quebec.

=== Saskatchewan ===
As of 2019, Saskatchewan has nine tribal councils:

- Agency Chiefs Tribal Council — Pelican Lake and Witchekan Lake
- Battlefords Agency Tribal Council — Ahtahkakoop; Moosomin; Mosquito, Grizzly Bear's Head, Lean Man; Red Pheasant Cree; Saulteaux; and Sweetgrass
- File Hills Qu'Appelle Tribal Council — Carry The Kettle, Little Black Bear, Muscowpetung, Nekaneet, Okanese, Pasqua, Peepeekisis 81, Piapot, Standing Buffalo, Star Blanket, and Wood Mountain
- Meadow Lake Tribal Council (MLTC) — Birch Narrows, Buffalo River, Canoe Lake Cree, Clearwater River Dene, English River Dene, Flying Dust, Island Lake, Makwa Sahgaiehcan, and Waterhen Lake
- Northwest Professional Services — Little Pine, Lucky Man, and Poundmaker
- Prince Albert Grand Council — Black Lake Denesuline, Cumberland House, Fond du Lac Dene, Hatchet Lake Dene, James Smith, Lac La Ronge Indian Band, Montreal Lake, Peter Ballantyne Cree, Red Earth, Shoal Lake Cree, Sturgeon Lake, and Wahpeton Dakota
- Saskatoon Tribal Council — Kinistin Saulteaux, Mistawasis Nêhiyawak, Muskeg Lake Cree, Muskoday, One Arrow, Whitecap Dakota, and Yellow Quill
- Touchwood Agency Tribal Council — Day Star, George Gordon, Kawacatoose, and Muskowekwan
- Yorkton Tribal Administration — Cote 366, Kahkewistahaw, Keeseekoose, Ocean Man, The Key, and Zagime Anishinabek

=== Yukon ===
As of 2019, Yukon has two tribal councils:

- Council of Kaska Chiefs
- Southern Tutchone Tribal Council
