= Treaty 11 =

Treaty between First Nations and Canadian Crown

Treaty 11, the last of the Numbered Treaties, was an agreement established between 1921 and 1922 between King George V and various First Nation band governments in what is today the Northwest Territories.

Henry Anthony Conroy was appointed treaty commissioner and conducted the negotiations and signings in 1921. However, he was unable to gain signatures from some bands in the Liard district during that summer. Further complicating matters was Conroy's death in April 1922. Thomas William Harris, the Indian Agent at Fort Simpson, Conroy's replacement, conducted the remaining treaty signings at Liard in July 1922. The signatories included Bishop Gabriel-Joseph-Elie Breynat of the Apostolic Vicariate of Mackenzie.

The boundary between Treaty 8 and Treaty 11 is ambiguous. The Yellowknives Dene First Nation is a signatory to Treaty 8, but according to the text of the treaties the Yellowknife Nation's territory, known as Chief Drygeese Territory, is within Treaty 11.

== Timeline ==
- 27 June 1921: Fort Providence signing
- 11 July 1921: Fort Simpson signing
- 13 July 1921: Fort Wrigley signing
- 15 July 1921: Fort Norman signing
- 21 July 1921: Good Hope signing
- 26 July 1921: Arctic Red River signing
- 28 July 1921: Fort McPherson signing
- 22 August 1921: Fort Rae signing
- 27 April 1922: treaty commissioner Henry Anthony Conroy dies
- 17 July 1922: Liard signing under new commissioner Harris

== List of Treaty 11 First Nations ==
- Acho Dene Koe First Nation
- Aklavik First Nation
- Behdzi Ahda' First Nation
- Dechi Laot'i First Nations
- Deh Gáh Got'ı̨ę First Nation
- Délı̨nę First Nation
- Dog Rib Rae First Nation
- Fort Good Hope First Nation
- Gameti First Nation
- Gwichya Gwich'in First Nation
- Inuvik Native Band
- Jean Marie River First Nation
- Ka'a'gee Tu First Nation
- Łı́ı́dlı̨ı̨ Kų́ę́ First Nation
- Nahɂą Dehé Dene Band
- Pehdzeh Ki First Nation
- Sambaa K'e First Nation
- Tetlit Gwich'in First Nation
- Tulita Dene First Nation
- West Point First Nation
- Wha Ti First Nation

Although parts of Treaty 11 lands are in the Yukon, none of the First Nations centered in the Yukon, including Liard First Nation, are linked to any signatories of Treaty 11.

== See also ==
- Numbered Treaties
- The Canadian Crown and Aboriginal peoples
