= Slavey =

First Nation in Western Canada

Slavey (Dene Tha' & Dehcho)
Awokanak
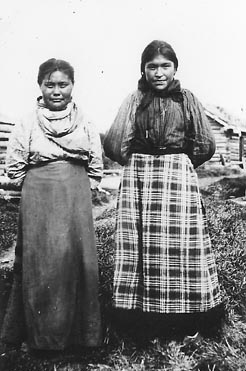
- Slavey girls, Mackenzie River, Northwest Territories

Total population
- 2,630 (2016 census)

Regions with significant populations
- Canada (Northwest Territories, Alberta)

Languages
- English, North and South Slavey language

Religion
- Animism, Christianity, Slavey Religion

Related ethnic groups
- Sahtu (North Slavey)

The Slavey (also Awokanak, Slave, and South Slavey) are a First Nations group of Indigenous peoples in Canada. They speak the Slavey language, one of the Athabaskan languages. Part of the Dene people, their homelands are in the Great Slave Lake region, in Canada's Northwest Territories, northeastern British Columbia, and northwestern Alberta.

== Name ==
=== Cree exonym "slave" ===
Slave(y) is a translation of Awokanak, the name given to the Dene by the Cree, "who sometimes raided and enslaved their less aggressive northern neighbors". The names of the Slave River, Lesser Slave River, Great Slave Lake, and Lesser Slave Lake all derive from this Cree name. Esclaves remains incorporated in the French names of these geographical features, since the French traded with the Cree before the English did. The people now called Slavey in English were not necessarily taken as slaves in that period.

=== Dehcho autonym ===
The name Slavey is seldom used by the people themselves, who call themselves Dene. Indigenous ethnonyms for South Slavey people and language are Dehcho, Deh Cho Dene ("Mackenzie River People") or Dene Tha.

Though most Athabaskan peoples call themselves Dene, those in the Northwest Territories tend to use it for their particular group specifically. However, the northern Slavey are also known in English as the Sahtú, while the southern band are known as the Deh Cho.

== Groups ==
The South Slavey live in northwestern Alberta, northeastern British Columbia, and the southern Northwest Territories. First Nations of South Slavey people:

- The Fort Nelson First Nation (Treaty 8) in British Columbia. Own name: Dene "the people", for language Dene k'e. Historical literature Fort Nelson Indian Band, Fort Nelson Slavey Band, Fort Nelson Indians.
- The Dene Tha' First Nation in Alberta. Own name: for people Dene Tha' or Dene Dháa "ordinary people", for language Dene Dháh. Historical literature by a number of names, including the following: Upper Hay River Band; Hay Lake(s) Band; Hay River Indians; Slave Band; Slavey Indians at Hay Lake(s); Upper Hay River Post Indians; and Bistcho Lake Tribe.
- The Dehcho First Nations (also called Deh Cho Dene – "Mackenzie River Dene") in the Northwest Territories:
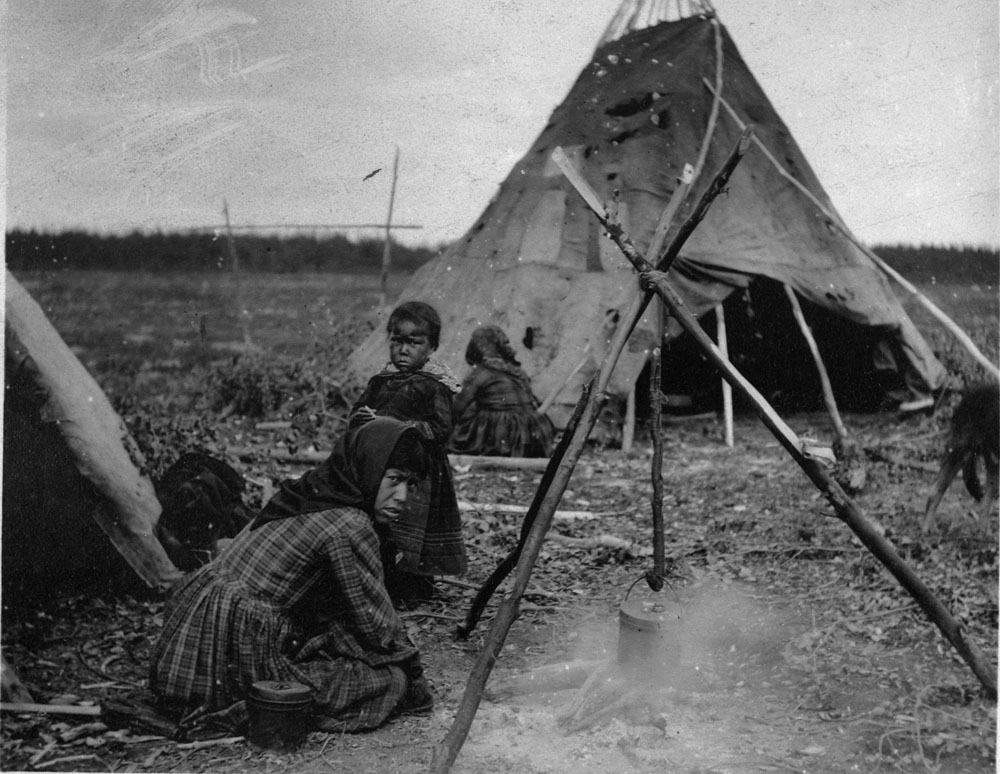
  Slavey camp near Fort Providence, Northwest Territories, photographed between 1870 and 1920
  - Acho Dene Koe First Nation – Fort Liard (Ahcho Koe or Ahcho Kue)
  - Deh Gáh Got'ı̨ę First Nation – Fort Providence (Zhahti Koe or Zhahti Kue)
  - Jean Marie River First Nation (Tthe'K'ehdeli Dene) – Jean Marie River (Tthek'éhdélį or Tthek'edeli)
  - Katl'odeeche First Nation (Kátłʼodehche Dene) – Hay River with Hay River Reserve (Xátł'odehchee)
  - Ka'a'gee Tu First Nation (Ka'agee Tu Dene) – Kakisa (K'ágee)
  - Łı́ı́dlı̨ı̨ Kų́ę́ First Nation (Liidli Kue Dene) – Fort Simpson (Liidli Kue)
  - Nahɂą Dehé Dene Band (N'ah adehe Dene) – Nahanni Butte (Tthenáágó)
  - Pehdzeh Ki First Nation (Pehdzeh Ki Dene) – Wrigley (Pehdzeh Ki)
  - Sambaa K'e First Nation (Sambaa K'e Dene) – Sambaa K'e
  - West Point First Nation – West Point (Ts'ueh Nda – Spruce Point), headquartered in Hay River

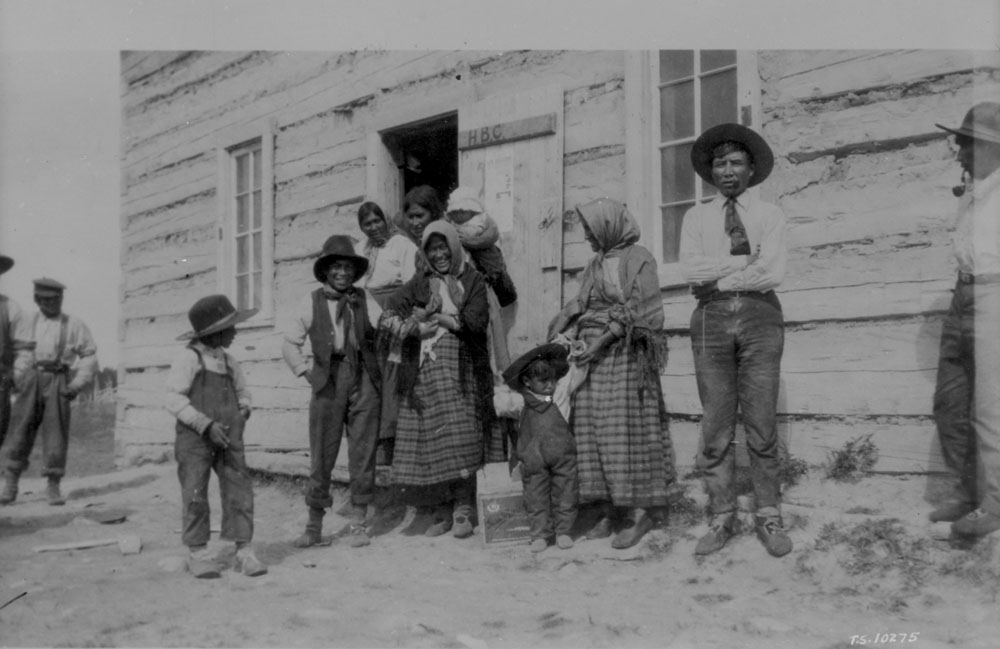
Slavey people at Hay River, North-West Territories, in 1925

The Sahtu, Sahtu Dene ("Great Bear Lake People") or North Slavey people live exclusively in the Northwest Territories. They speak the North Slavey language.

The Navajo people (Diné) of the Four Corners region of the Southwestern United States are said to be descended from the Nahani, who lived where the Nahanni National Park Reserve is, and also the Slavey of Northern Canada.

== In popular culture ==
Most residents of Lynx River, the fictional town in which CBC drama North of 60 is set, are Slavey. Though the word itself is seldom mentioned in dialogue (band members generally identifying themselves as Dene), the town is located in Slavey territory and on one occasion a character proposes a toast before the assembled members in the Slavey language.

== Image(s) ==
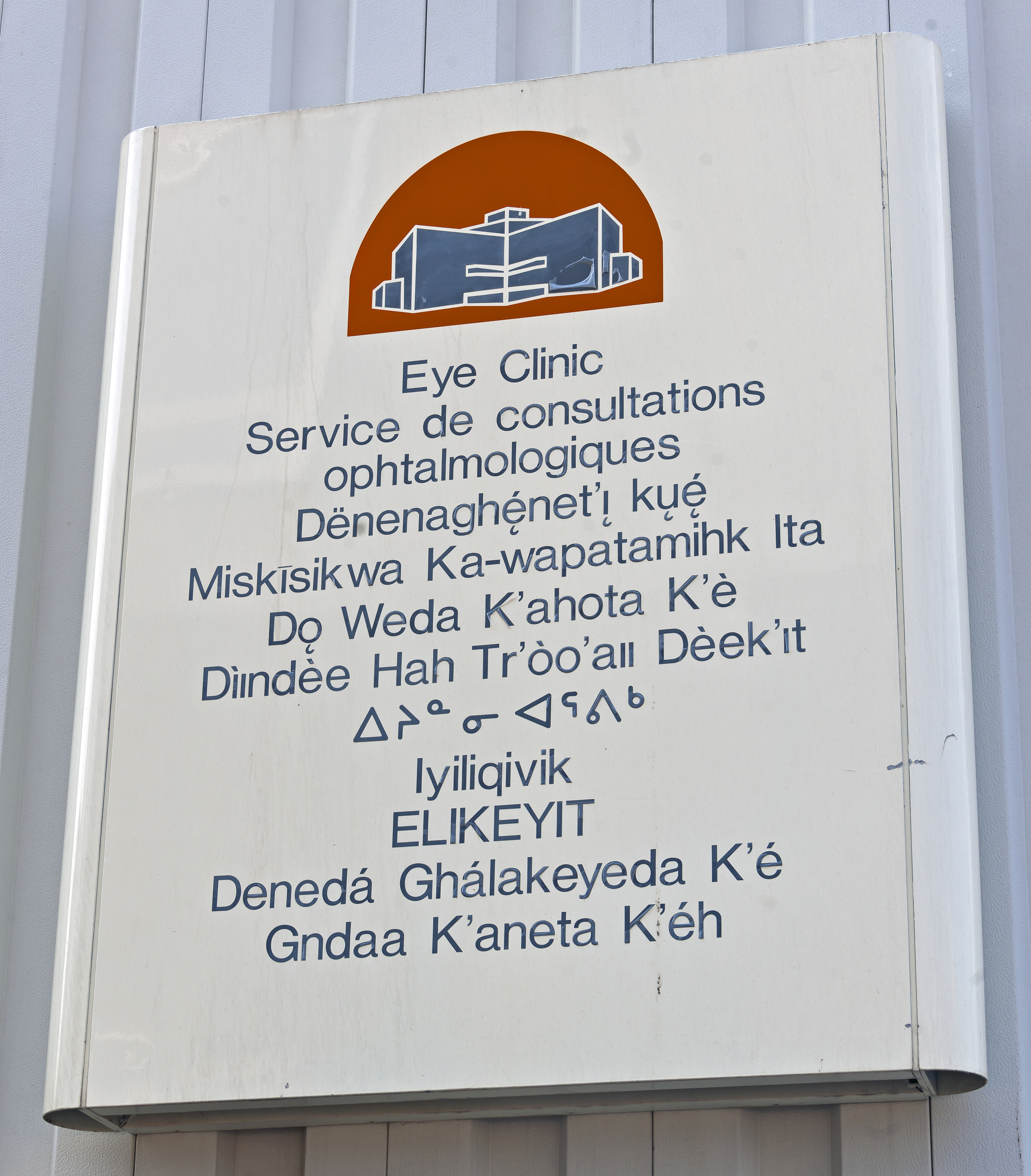
Sign for government-run eye clinic in Yellowknife, with all 11 official languages of the Northwest Territories (from top to bottom: English, French, Chipewyan, Cree, Dogrib, Gwichʼin, Inuktitut = ijinniarvik, Inuvialuktun/Inuinnaqtun, North Slavey, South Slavey)

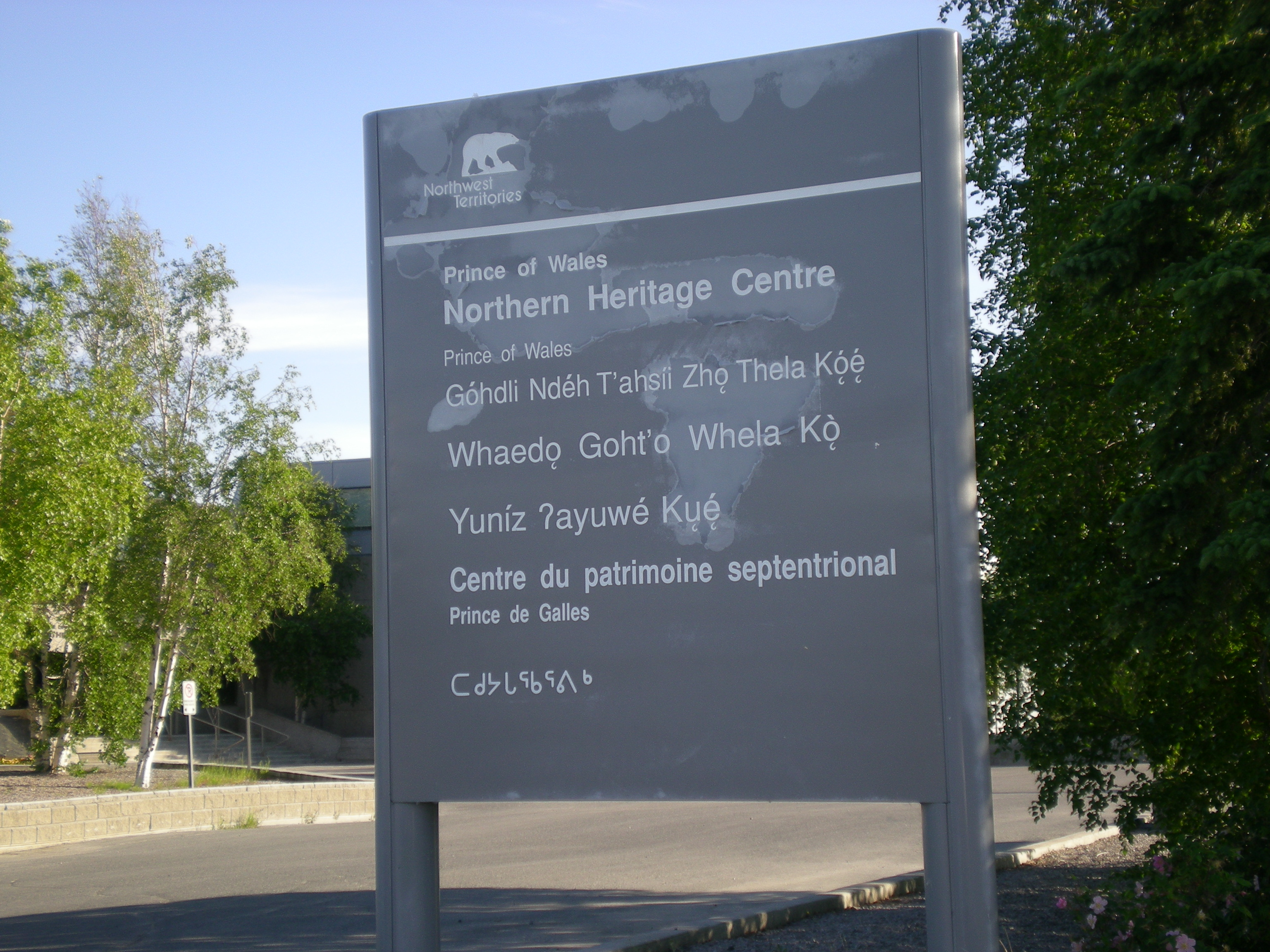
Prince of Wales Northern Heritage Centre, languages in order of appearance: English, South Slavey, Tłı̨chǫ (Dogrib), Chipewayan, French

== See also ==
- Slavey Jargon (Broken Slavey)
