= Deh Cho =

Deh Cho or Dehcho is the Dene name of the Mackenzie River in the Northwest Territories of Canada. It can also refer to:

- Dehcho Region, Northwest Territories
- Deh Cho (electoral district), Northwest Territories
- Deh Cho Bridge, which spans the Mackenzie River
- Dehcho First Nations, a political grouping of indigenous peoples in the Northwest Territories
- Slavey, the main Dene sub-group that live along the Mackenzie River, also known as Dehcho, Deh Cho Dene (Mackenzie River People) or Dene Tha
