= Dahti Tsetso =

Dene environmentalist from Canada

- Born: Fort Simpson, Northwest Territories
- Citizenship: Dehcho First Nations and Canada
- Occupations: Indigenous environmental advocacy and education
- Known for: helping establish Edéhzhíe Protected Area

Dahti Tsetso is a Tłı̨chǫ Dene environmentalist from Canada. She is the CEO of the Our Land for the Future Trust. Her past roles include serving as deputy director of the Indigenous Leadership Initiative and as the director of lands and resources for Dehcho First Nations.

== Early life and education ==
Tsetso was born in Fort Simpson (Łı́ı́dlı̨ı̨ Kų́ę́), Northwest Territories. She holds a bachelor of science in environmental conservation sciences and a bachelor of arts degree in Native Studies from the University of Alberta, and a Diploma in Indigenous Language Revitalization from the University of Victoria.

== Environmental advocacy ==
Tsetso worked for Dehcho First Nations for more than 10 years. While serving as the resource management coordinator for her First Nation, she finalized agreements between Dehcho First Nations and Environment and Climate Change Canada for the Edéhzhíe Protected Area, Canada's first Indigenous Protected and Conserved Area. Located on the Horn Plateau, the 14,249-square-kilometre region, will be managed cooperatively by the Dehcho First Nations and the Canadian Wildlife Service. Tsetso said this ground-breaking agreement "will give us some capacity to start addressing the goals of our communities and approaching protection in ways that make sense to them, that helps our communities approach stewardship in a meaningful way."

In her role as deputy director of the Indigenous Leadership Initiative, Tsetso led the convening efforts to bring together Indigenous, territorial, federal and private partners to explore a conservation finance mechanism known as Project Finance for Permanence. These efforts resulted in the NWT: Our Land for the Future Agreement, finalized in November 2024. This agreement establishes a $375 million dollar Trust to support the conservation and stewardship ambitions of Indigenous Partners in the NWT.

During her time with the Dehcho, Tsetso also collaboratively developed the Dehcho K'éhodi Stewardship and Guardians program. Dehcho K'éhodi translates as "taking care the Dehcho" in Dene Zhatié.

== Educational programs ==
The Dehcho K'éhodi Stewardship and Guardians program includes annual Dehcho Youth Ecology and Traditional Knowledge camps, which Tsetso led for several years. Dene elders and Western scientists teach Dehcho youth about environmental issues and help non-Indigenous scientific researchers build relationships with the Dehcho First Nation.
