= Melaw Nakehk'o =

Canadian filmmaker, actress, activist

Melaw Nakehk'o is an actress, artist, traditional moose hide tanner, and co-founder of the First Nations organization Dene Nahjo. She is primarily known for her role as the kidnapped Arikara woman Powaqa in the 2015 film The Revenant.

== Early life ==
Nakehk'o is Dehcho Dene and Denesuline, and was born in Fort Simpson in the Northwest Territories, Canada.

== Acting career ==
The Revenant was Nakehk'o's first film role.

She was at the grocery store with her two young sons one Saturday morning when there was an open casting call in Yellowknife, Northwest Territories. "People kept texting me and telling me I should go do this thing," she said. When the grocery store clerk also told her to try out for the role, she went to the casting call, arriving an hour before it was over. For her audition, Melaw had to improvise a scene with other actors about trading furs for a horse. "I didn’t have to read anything; it was all just presence and just being badass," she said.

In a radio interview, Nakehk'o said she was impressed with film director Alejandro G. Iñárritu's ability to bring out her acting ability in the role of Powaqa, an Arikara woman who is kidnapped by French fur trappers, as well as with his accurate portrayal of indigenous people. She has also said that the brutality with which her character is treated in the movie reflects violence against indigenous women that is still going on today.

For the red carpet premiere of the movie in Hollywood, she received media attention when she wore a dress that was a collaboration between Metis artist Christi Belcourt and Rome-based house of Valentino. "It was really important to be able to represent Indigenous designers at such a high level of fashion, because today there’s a lot of cultural appropriation with a lot of the huge fashion houses and people just being disrespectful wearing headdresses and Native American-inspired stuff," Nakehk'o stated.

== Cultural activities ==
Nakehk'o is a visual artist who paints, sews and beads, as well as a traditional moose hide tanner based out of Yellowknife, Northwest Territories. She has taught moosehide tanning at the Dechinta Bush University Center for Research and Learning. In 2012, she received a Minister's Cultural Award for "sharing the knowledge of her elders and for bringing a renewed interest to the art of moose hide tanning."

She is a co-founder of Dene Nahjo, an organization that promotes leadership and social and environmental justice for indigenous people of the northern territories.
