= South Slavey =

South Slavey may refer to:

- The South Slavey people, or Slavey
- The Slavey language
