= Acho Dene Koe First Nation =

Dene band government in Northwest Territories, Canada

- Band No. 758
- People: South Slavey
- Treaty: Treaty 11
- Headquarters: Fort Liard
- Province: Northwest Territories; Yukon; British Columbia

Land
- Main reserve: Fort Liard Settlement

Population (2025)
- On reserve: 1
- On other land: 550
- Off reserve: 164
- Total population: 715

Government
- Chief: Eugene Hope

Tribal Council
- Deh Cho First Nations

Website
- adkfirstnation.ca

The Acho Dene Koe First Nation is a Dene band government based in Fort Liard, Northwest Territories, Canada. Its main community is the Hamlet of Fort Liard. Acho Dene Koe First Nation has an existing treaty land claim settlement with the Governments of Canada, Northwest Territories, Yukon and British Columbia. It is a signatory government to Treaty 11 and is a member government of the Dehcho First Nations Tribal Council. Registered population is 715, 164 of whom live off-reserve. As of May 2017, Gene Hope was elected as Chief.
