= Edéhzhíe Protected Area =

Indigenous protected and conserved region in the Dehcho region

- Location within Canada Location within Northwest Territories
- Location: Northwest Territories, Canada
- Nearest city: Dehcho Region
- Coordinates: 61.438767°N 116.586914°W
- Area: 14,218 km^{2} (5,490 sq mi)
- Established: 21 August 2018
- Governing body: Dehcho First Nations, Environment and Climate Change Canada

Edéhzhíe Protected Area (Dene for source waters, anglicized as "Edehzhie Protected Area") is an Indigenous Protected and Conserved Area in the Dehcho Region, the southwestern part of the Northwest Territories, and was established in 2018. Edéhzhíe covers 14,218 km^{2} and contains important habitat within its lakes, wetlands, and boreal forest. The Indigenous Protected and Conserved Area is culturally significant for the Dehcho and Tłįchǫ Dene peoples, and hosts trails and harvesting areas in addition to traditional sites for hunting, fishing, and trapping. Headwaters for much of the Dehcho are supplied from the Edéhzhíe Protected Area, including the Willowlake, Horn, and Rabbitskin Rivers that are sourced from the Horn Plateau.

Threatened species and species at risk supported by the protected area include boreal woodland caribou, wood bison, wolverine, peregrine falcon, short-eared owl, and olive-sided flycatcher. Mills Lake within Edéhzhíe is an International Biological Program Site that is visited by as many as 50,000 lesser snow geese and 5,000 tundra swan during migration periods. On-the-land guardians with the Dehcho K’éhodi (Dene for taking care of the Dehcho) Stewardship Program monitor and co-manage the protected area alongside the Edéhzhíe Management Board and Canadian Wildlife Service.

== History ==
In 1998, the Dehcho First Nations began working through the Protected Areas Strategy to permanently protect Edéhzhíe. In 2002, Edéhzhíe was designated a Candidate Protected Area, protected from land withdrawals. In 2009, the Edéhzhíe Working Group submitted a Recommendations Report after public review to the Dehcho First Nations, Tłįchǫ Government, Government of the Northwest Territories, and Government of Canada. In 2010, Northern Affairs Minister John Duncan did not renew subsurface protection within the Candidate Protected Area. However, Northern Affairs extended the protection of surface activities such as logging until 2012. Dehcho First Nations asked the Federal Court to overturn the order to remove subsurface mining in the Horn Plateau; in the court application, Dehcho First Nations stated that removing subsurface protection "was made without any consultation as required by law, and is regarded by the Dehcho First Nations as a complete betrayal of the letter and the spirit of the Protected Areas Strategy." In 2011, the federal government reinstated protection to 57% of the area in response to the 2010 court challenge. In 2012, federal judge John. A. O'Keefe rejected the motion to dismiss the Dehcho First Nations court action.

In 2016, Dehcho First Nations and Government of Canada began working on an agreement for the establishment of Edéhzhíe. The originally proposed 25,000 km^{2} area was reduced to 14,000 km^{2}; areas with large mineral deposits were removed from the protected area and the remaining area would have full surface and subsurface protection. In 2018, Dehcho First Nations passed a resolution to establish Edéhzhíe as an Indigenous Protected Area and a National Wildlife Area under the Canada Wildlife Act. Dehcho First Nations and Environment and Climate Change Canada signed the Edéhzhíe Agreement for the Edéhzhíe Protected Area. The Government of the Northwest Territories withdrew subsurface rights for the protected area indefinitely in 2020. Edéhzhíe was designated as a National Wildlife Area in 2022.
