= Beʼsha Blondin =

First Nations' Elder from the Sahtu Region

Beʼsha Blondin is noted as a "respected elder and healer of the Dene people. Co-author of six publications on Indigenous healing practices, she is co-founder and director of the Arctic Indigenous Wellness Foundation and the founder and director of Northern Integrated Culture and the Environment (Northern ICE.)

== Career ==
Blondin is a First Nations' Elder from the Sahtu Region who follows the spiritual practices and protocols of the "Dene Way of Life". Denendeh is part of the Northwest Territories that stretches from Alaska to the Southern tip of North America. She is the co-founder and director of the Arctic Indigenous Wellness Foundation and the founder and director of Northern Integrated Culture with the Environment (Northern ICE), which strengthens Aboriginal communities in the North. She is an Elder advisor at the Institute for Circumpolar Health Research (ICHR), a nonprofit organization that engages in health research relevant to the people in the circumpolar regions of Canada. She is a director and one of the leaders at Pull Together Now, a non-profit that connects people to each other and the Earth. She is an advisor for the inVivo Planetary Health Network and one of the speakers in the opening session of the 2021 inVivo Planetary Health Conference.

She is health administer and community development expert who has worked to revitalize Aboriginal cultural knowledge and belief systems and heal her people by "delivering land-based healing programs, developing wellness plans, and teaching ceremonies, healing practices, cultural competency, and traditional knowledge approaches to wellness."

Dene National Chief Noeline Villibrun asked Blondin to come forward and pray during her keynote speech at an International Indigenous Conference at Ben Gurian University in Beersheba, Negev in 2004 Blondin helped lead and spoke at the opening ceremonies of the Parliament of the World's Religions Conference in Salt Lake City in 2015.

== Publications ==
Blondin is the co-author of 6 publications, one of which is a scoping review that attempts to give Western practitioners, and communities an understanding of the role of traditional medicine in clinical settings and policy advances. She is a midwife and one of seven Aboriginal elders who contributed to Kim Anderson's "Notokwe Opikiheet--"Old-Lady Raised": aboriginal women's reflections on ethics and methodologies in health research." Her co-written article, "Indigenous perspectives on education for sustainable healthcare" was an academic journal finalist with the Association for the Advancement of Sustainability in Higher Education (AASHE). Her publications include

- Redvers, Nicole & Celidwen, Yuria & Schultz, Clinton & Horn, Ojistoh & Githaiga, Cicilia & Vera, Melissa & Perdrisat, Marlikka & Mad Plume, Lynn & Kobei, Daniel & Kain, Myrna & Poelina, Anne & Rojas, Juan & Blondin, Be'sha. (2022). Personal View The determinants of planetary health: an Indigenous consensus perspective. The Lancet Planetary Health. 6. E156-163. 10.1016/S2542-5196(21)00354-5.
- Blondin, Be'sha & Cherba, Maria & Boer, Kaila & Etter, Meghan & Healey, Gwen & Horlick, Sidney & Redvers, Nicole & Russell, Laurie & Ruttan, Jimmy & Tabish, Taha. (2022). An Aajiiqatigiingniq (consensus) process to develop an evaluation tool for health and wellness outcomes of land-based programs in the Canadian North. 6.
- Redvers, Nicole & Blondin, Be'sha. (2020). Traditional Indigenous medicine in North America: A scoping review. PLoS ONE. 15. 10.1371/journal.pone.0237531.
- Redvers, Nicole & Schultz, Clinton & Prince, Melissa & Cunningham, Myrna & Jones, Rhys & Blondin, Be'sha. (2020). Indigenous perspectives on education for sustainable healthcare. Medical Teacher. 42. 1–6. 10.1080/0142159X.2020.1791320.
- Redvers, Poelina, A., Schultz, C., Kobei, D. M., Githaiga, C., Perdrisat, M., Prince, D., & Blondin, B. (2020). Indigenous Natural and First Law in Planetary Health. Challenges (Basel), 11(2), 29–. https://doi.org/10.3390/challe11020029
- Redvers, Nicole & Marianayagam, Justina & Blondin, Be'sha. (2019). Improving access to Indigenous medicine for patients in hospital-based settings: a challenge for health systems in northern Canada. International Journal of Circumpolar Health. 78. 1577093. 10.1080/22423982.2019.1577093.
