= Salt River First Nation =

First Nations government in the Northwest Territories, Canada

Salt River First Nation Band No. 759
- People: Cree; Dënesųłı̨né
- Treaty: Treaty 8
- Headquarters: Fort Smith
- Territory: Northwest Territories

Population (2019)
- On reserve: 6
- On other land: 264
- Off reserve: 732
- Total population: 1002

Government
- Chief: Toni Heron

Website
- saltriveronline.com

The Salt River First Nation is a Dene First Nations band government in the Northwest Territories, Canada. The band is headquartered in the town of Fort Smith.

In April 2019, the First Nation opened a new $16.7M business and conference center in Fort Smith, resembling the shape of the First Nation's land when viewed from above.
