= Nahɂą Dehé Dene Band =

Dene First Nations band government in the Northwest Territories, Canada

Nahɂą Dehé Dene Band Band No. 766
- People: South Slavey
- Headquarters: Nahanni Butte
- Territory: Northwest Territories

Population (2019)
- On reserve: 1
- On other land: 121
- Off reserve: 19
- Total population: 141

Tribal Council
- Dehcho First Nations

The Nahɂą Dehé Dene Band is a Dene First Nations band government in the Northwest Territories. The band inhabits the small community of Nahanni Butte, where 121 of its members live. The remaining 19 band members reside elsewhere.

The Nahɂą Dehé belong to the Dehcho First Nations.
