= Ka'a'gee Tu First Nation =

Ka'a'gee Tu First Nation Band No. 768
- People: Dene
- Treaty: Treaty 11
- Headquarters: Kakisa
- Territory: Northwest Territories

Population (2019)
- On other land: 50
- Off reserve: 24
- Total population: 74

Government
- Chief: Lloyd Chicot

Tribal Council
- Dehcho First Nations

The Ka'a'gee Tu First Nation is a Dene First Nations band government in the Northwest Territories. The band is headquartered in the community of Kakisa, the smallest in the territory.

The Ka'a'gee Tu First Nation is a member of the Dehcho First Nations.
