= Deh Gáh Got'ı̨ę First Nation =

First Nations government in Canada

Deh Gáh Got'ı̨ę First Nation Band No. 760
- People: Dene
- Treaty: Treaty 11
- Headquarters: Fort Providence
- Territory: Northwest Territories

Population (2019)
- On other land: 799
- Off reserve: 307
- Total population: 1106

Government
- Chief: Michael Vandell

Tribal Council
- Dehcho First Nations

Website
- dehgahgotie.ca

The Deh Gáh Got'ı̨ę First Nation is a Dene First Nations band government in the Northwest Territories. The band is headquartered in the community of Fort Providence, where 799 of its registered members live.

The Deh Gáh Got'ı̨ę First Nation is member of the Dehcho First Nations.
