= Inuvik Native Band =

Band of Gwichʼin First Nation in the Northwest Territories

Inuvik Native Band Band No. 780
- People: Gwichʼin
- Treaty: Treaty 11
- Headquarters: Inuvik
- Territory: Northwest Territories

Population (2019)
- On other land: 213
- Off reserve: 428
- Total population: 641

Government
- Chief: Larry Neyando

Tribal Council
- Gwichʼin Tribal Council

Website
- inbnt.ca

The Inuvik Native Band is a Gwichʼin First Nations band government in the Northwest Territories. The band is located in Inuvik, a mixed community where First Nations, Inuit, and non-Indigenous people live in approximately equal numbers. It received official recognition as a Native band by the Canadian government in 1982.

The Inuvik Native Band is a member of the Gwichʼin Tribal Council.

The Nihtat Gwich’in Council and Inuvik Native Band are distinct entities with mostly overlapping membership. The Nihtat Gwich’in Council represents Inuvik-based beneficiaries of the Gwich’in Comprehensive Land Claim Agreement (GCLCA). While the Inuvik Native Band consists mainly of Gwich’in, membership is not limited to Gwichʼin beneficiaries of the GCLCA. It promotes the interests of all Indigenous people in Inuvik.
