= Fort Providence =

Fort Providence Zhahti Kų́ę́
- Hamlet
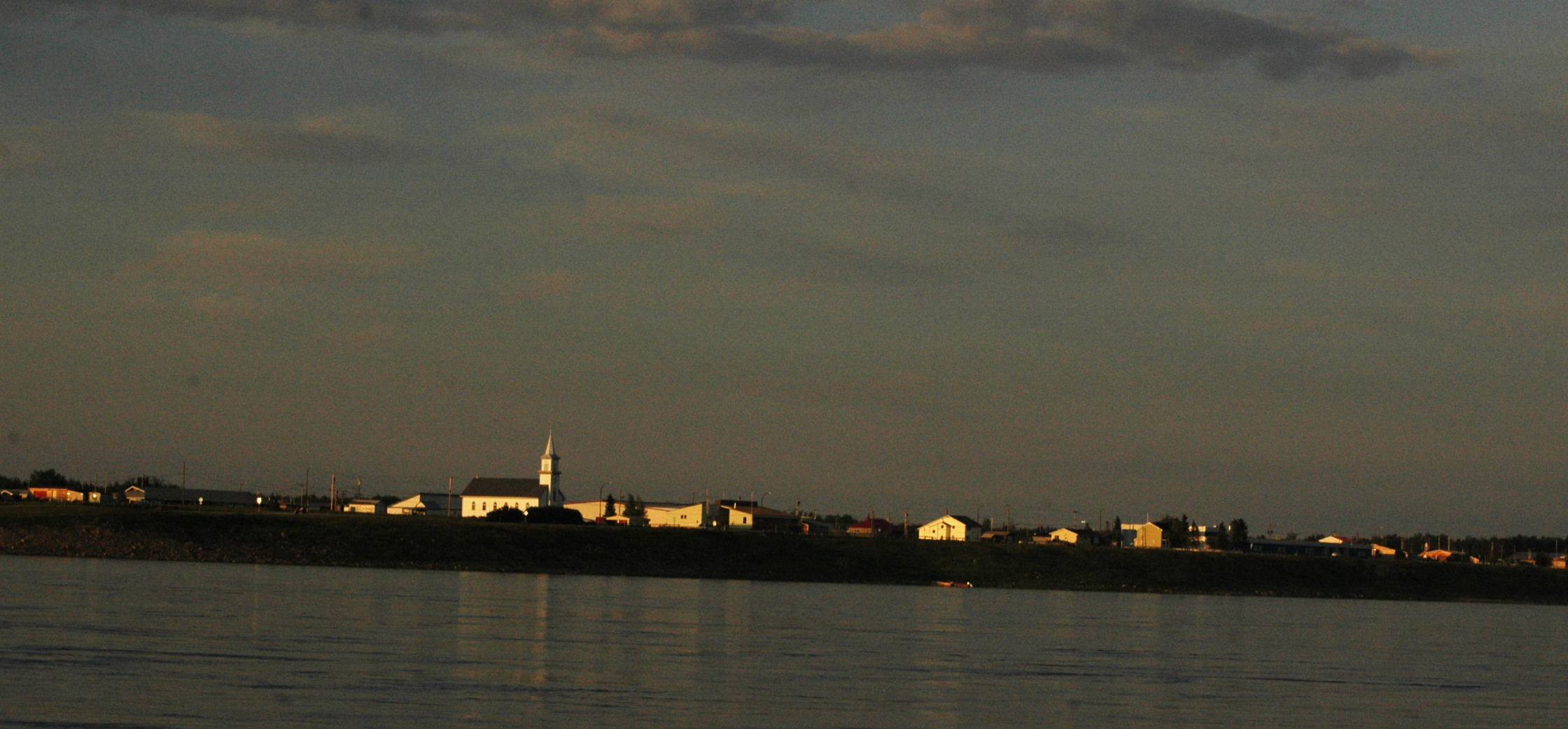
- Fort Providence from the Mackenzie River

- Location within Northwest Territories Location within Canada
- Coordinates: 61°21′17″N 117°39′36″W
- Country: Canada
- Territory: Northwest Territories
- Region: South Slave Region
- Constituency: Deh Cho
- Census division: Region 4
- Hamlet: 1 January 1987

Government
  - Mayor: Danny Beaulieu
  - MP: Michael McLeod

Area
  - Land: 255.05 km^{2} (98.48 sq mi)
- Elevation: 160 m (520 ft)

Population (2011)
  - Total: 695
  - Density: 2.7/km^{2} (7.0/sq mi)
- Time zone: UTC−06:00 (Northwest Territories Time)
- Canadian Postal code: X0E 0L0
- Area code: 867
- Telephone exchange: 699
- Living cost: 137.5^{A}
- Food price index: 134.7^{B}
- Sources: Department of Municipal and Community Affairs, Prince of Wales Northern Heritage Centre, Canada Flight Supplement^A2013 figure based on Edmonton = 100^B2015 figure based on Yellowknife = 100

Fort Providence (Slavey: Zhahti Kų́ę́, lit. 'mission house') is a hamlet in the South Slave Region of the Northwest Territories, Canada. Located west of Great Slave Lake, it has all-weather road connections by way of the Yellowknife Highway (Great Slave Highway) branch off the Mackenzie Highway, and the Deh Cho Bridge opened November 30, 2012, near Fort Providence over the Mackenzie. The bridge replaced the ice bridge and ferry, enabling year-round crossing of the river.

Fort Providence hosts the annual Mackenzie Days celebrations in August each year.

== History ==
Fort Providence was founded in the 1860s as a Catholic mission site. By 1868, the Hudson's Bay Company, which previously has a trading post at Big Island at the source of the MacKenzie River, moved the post to the location of the mission site. From that moment, the settlement was known as Fort Providence. In 1867, the Grey Nuns opened a boarding school and an orphanage in the settlement. Instruction languages were English and French, and most of the nuns originated from Quebec.

== Demographics ==
Federal census population history of Fort Providence
Year	Pop.	±%
1976	602	—
1981	605	+0.5%
1986	588	−2.8%
1991	645	+9.7%
1996	748	+16.0%
2001	753	+0.7%
2006	727	−3.5%
2011	734	+1.0%
2016	695	−5.3%
2021	618	−11.1%
Source: Statistics Canada

Annual population estimates

Year	Pop.	±%
1996	774	—
1997	828	+7.0%
1998	843	+1.8%
1999	842	−0.1%
2000	837	−0.6%
2001	819	−2.2%
2002	803	−2.0%
2003	824	+2.6%
2004	801	−2.8%
2005	799	−0.2%
2006	757	−5.3%

Year	Pop.	±%
2007	744	−1.7%
2008	742	−0.3%
2009	752	+1.3%
2010	748	−0.5%
2011	771	+3.1%
2012	778	+0.9%
2013	789	+1.4%
2014	788	−0.1%
2015	798	+1.3%
2016	788	−1.3%
2017	770	−2.3%

Sources: NWT Bureau of Statistics (2001 - 2017)

In the 2021 Census of Population conducted by Statistics Canada, Fort Providence had a population of 618 living in 256 of its 292 total private dwellings, a change of −11.1% from its 2016 population of 695. With a land area of 255.49 km^{2} (98.65 sq mi), it had a population density of 2.4/km^{2} (6.3/sq mi) in 2021.

In 2016, the majority of its population, 620, were Indigenous people, made up of 590 First Nations, Dene people, and 30 Métis.

== First Nations ==
The Dene of the community are represented by the Deh Gáh Got'ı̨ę First Nation and the Métis by Fort Providence Métis Nation. Both groups belong to the Dehcho First Nations.

== Gallery ==
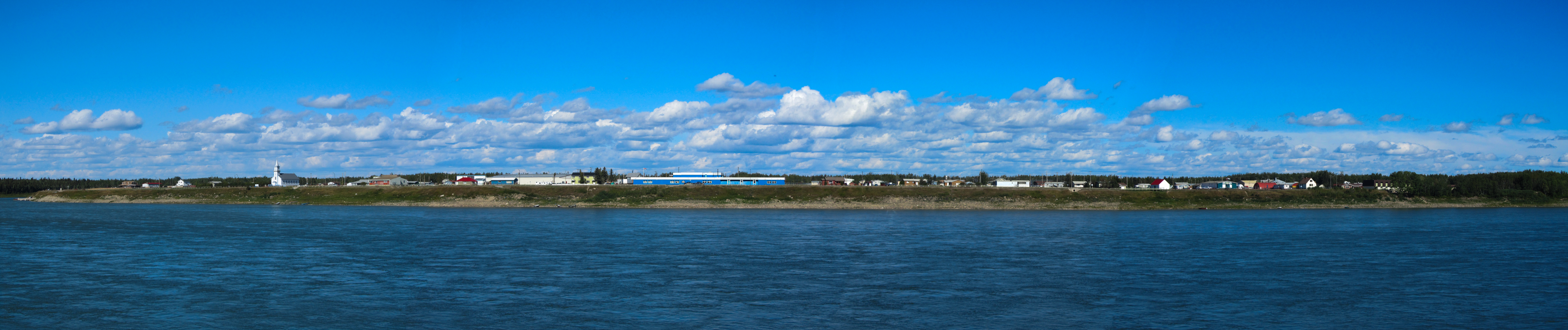
Fort Providence from the river

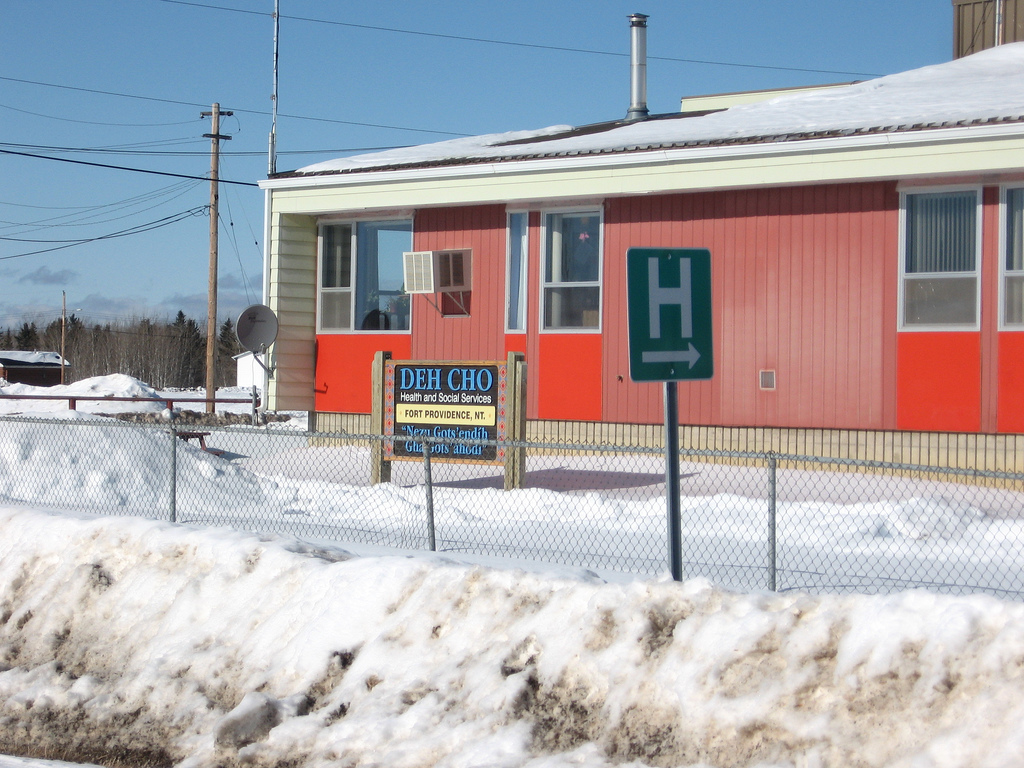
Fort Providence Health Centre

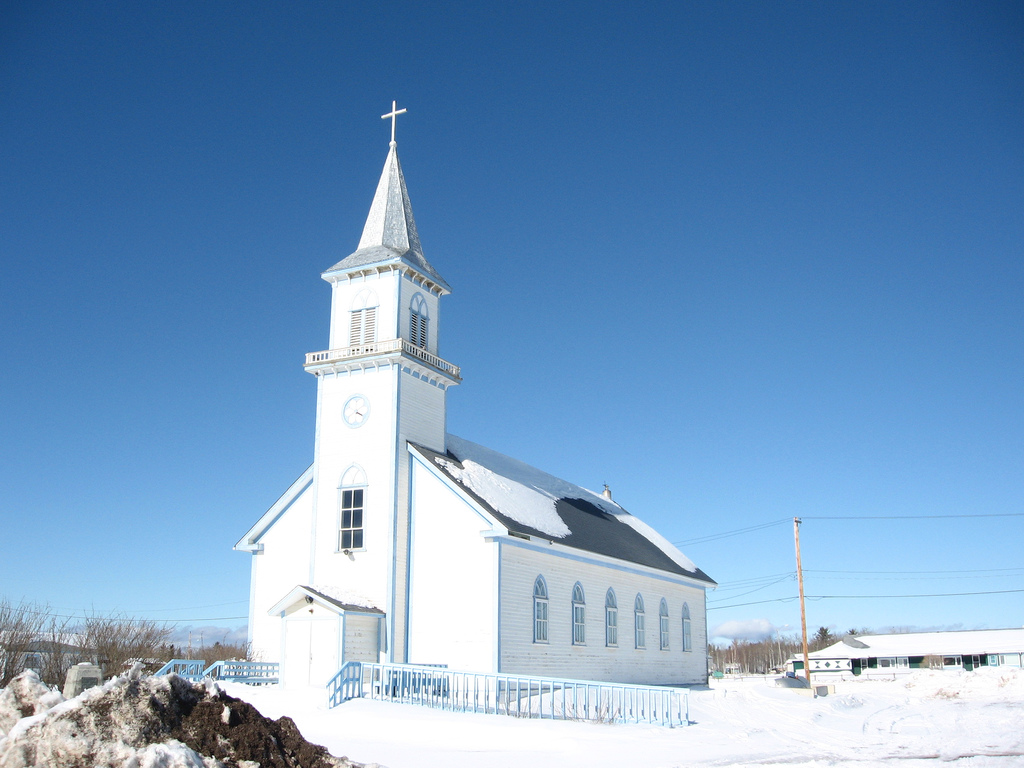
Our Lady of Providence RC Mission in Fort Providence

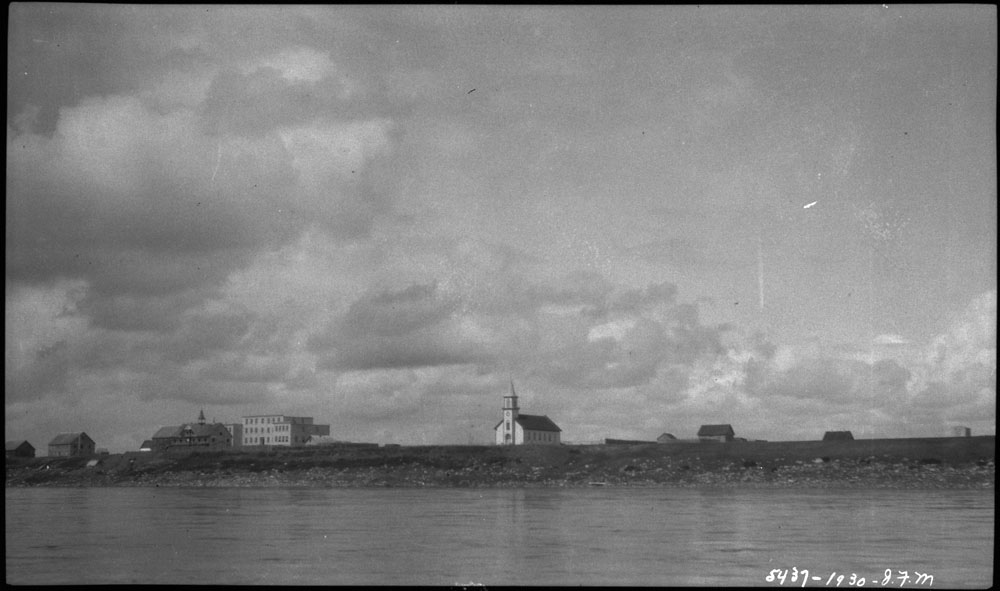
Providence Mission Indian Residential School showing new Roman Catholic Mission on the left, circa 1930

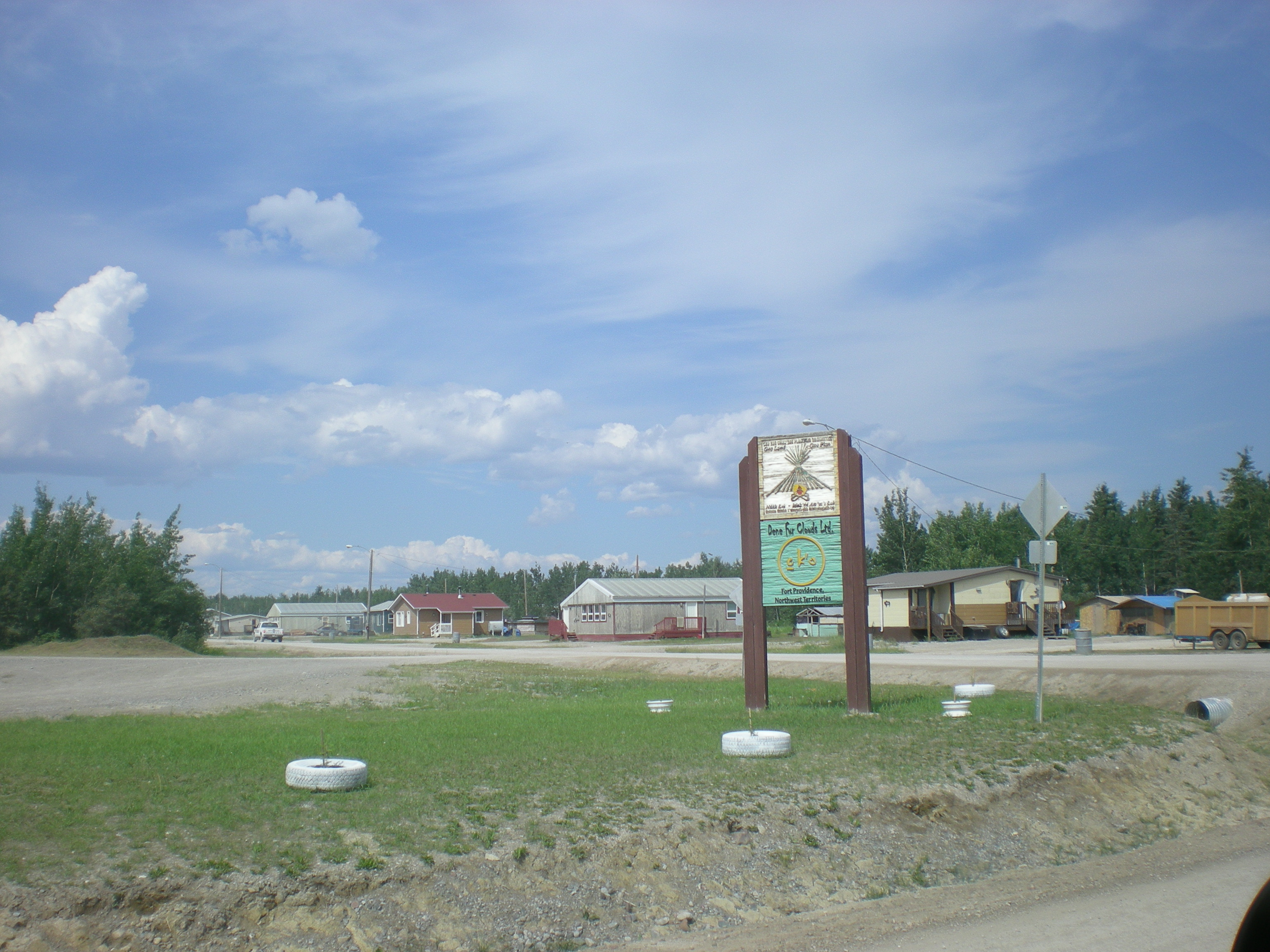
Fort Providence Deh Cho Land Use Planning Committee & Dene Fur Clouds sign

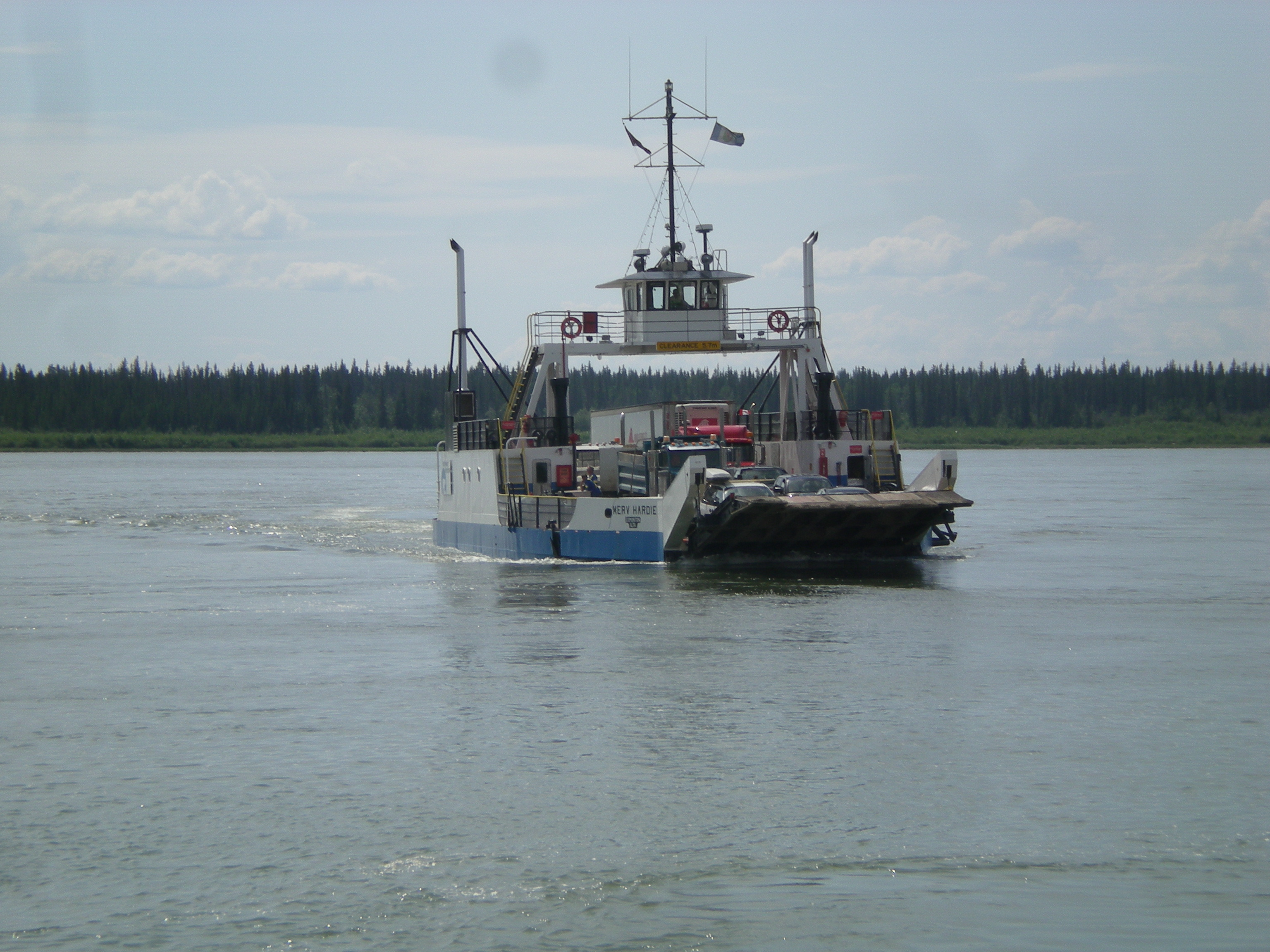
The Merv Hardie ferry in use before the bridge was opened.

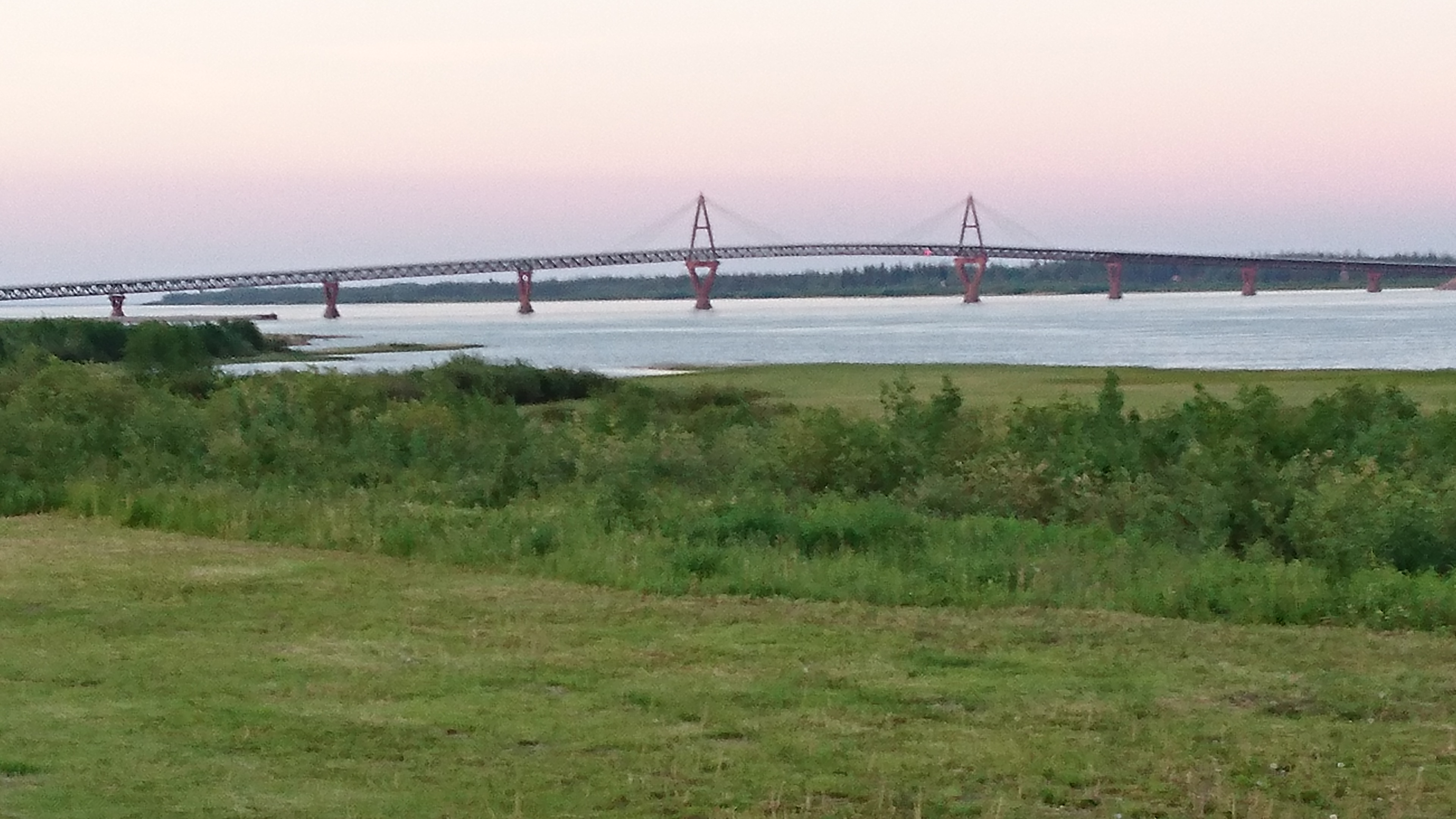
The Deh Cho Bridge

== Climate ==
Fort Providence has a continental subarctic climate (Dfc) typical of the Northwest Territories' populated areas. It is marked by a long cold winter season and short, warm summers, that in many ways are warmer than expected for an area so far north. Transition seasons are extremely short, with temperatures rising and falling quickly in respective seasons.

Climate data for Fort Providence WMO ID: 71087; coordinates 61°19′01″N 117°36′07″W; elevation: 161.5 m (530 ft); 1991−2020 normals
Month	Jan	Feb	Mar	Apr	May	Jun	Jul	Aug	Sep	Oct	Nov	Dec	Year
Record high humidex	10.1	9.6	16.4	22.9	31.2	35.7	37.9	36.5	31.8	24.1	11.9	11.8	37.9
Record high °C (°F)	7.0 (44.6)	9.9 (49.8)	16.5 (61.7)	22.9 (73.2)	31.3 (88.3)	34.3 (93.7)	35.2 (95.4)	35.3 (95.5)	30.7 (87.3)	24.2 (75.6)	12.0 (53.6)	11.8 (53.2)	35.3 (95.5)
Mean daily maximum °C (°F)	−18.5 (−1.3)	−13.2 (8.2)	−6.5 (20.3)	4.9 (40.8)	13.9 (57.0)	21.3 (70.3)	23.9 (75.0)	21.0 (69.8)	14.3 (57.7)	3.7 (38.7)	−8.5 (16.7)	−16.6 (2.1)	3.3 (37.9)
Daily mean °C (°F)	−22.9 (−9.2)	−19.0 (−2.2)	−13.8 (7.2)	−1.9 (28.6)	7.1 (44.8)	14.1 (57.4)	17.1 (62.8)	14.7 (58.5)	8.6 (47.5)	−0.1 (31.8)	−12.4 (9.7)	−20.6 (−5.1)	−2.4 (27.7)
Mean daily minimum °C (°F)	−27.2 (−17.0)	−24.7 (−12.5)	−21.2 (−6.2)	−8.7 (16.3)	0.3 (32.5)	6.8 (44.2)	10.3 (50.5)	8.3 (46.9)	2.8 (37.0)	−3.9 (25.0)	−16.1 (3.0)	−24.4 (−11.9)	−8.1 (17.4)
Record low °C (°F)	−46.8 (−52.2)	−43.5 (−46.3)	−40.4 (−40.7)	−36.0 (−32.8)	−16.3 (2.7)	−3.5 (25.7)	−2.0 (28.4)	−2.3 (27.9)	−9.9 (14.2)	−27.3 (−17.1)	−36.8 (−34.2)	−43.3 (−45.9)	−46.8 (−52.2)
Record low wind chill	−51.2	−52.5	−46.5	−43.0	−23.8	−5.2	−3.2	−4.2	−11.8	−33.7	−40.9	−51.0	−52.5
Average relative humidity (%) (at 1500 LST)	75.4	67.0	52.5	44.7	41.5	42.9	46.2	50.9	55.0	71.1	82.7	79.7	59.1
Source: Environment and Climate Change Canada

== See also ==
- List of municipalities in the Northwest Territories
- Fort Providence Airport
- Fort Providence Water Aerodrome
