= Gwichya Gwich'in First Nation =

First Nation band in Northwest Territories, Canada

Gwichya Gwich'in First Nation Band No. 753
- People: Gwich'in
- Treaty: Treaty 11
- Headquarters: Tsiigehtchic
- Territory: Northwest Territories

Population (2019)
- On other land: 230
- Off reserve: 253
- Total population: 483

Tribal Council
- Gwich'in Tribal Council

The Gwichya Gwich'in First Nation is a Gwich'in First Nations band government in the Northwest Territories. The band is located in Tsiigehtchic, a small, predominantly Gwich'in community on the Arctic Red River.

The Gwichya Gwich'in First Nation is a member of the Gwich'in Tribal Council.
