= Fort Simpson =

Fort Simpson Łı́ı́dlı̨ı̨ Kų́ę́
- Village
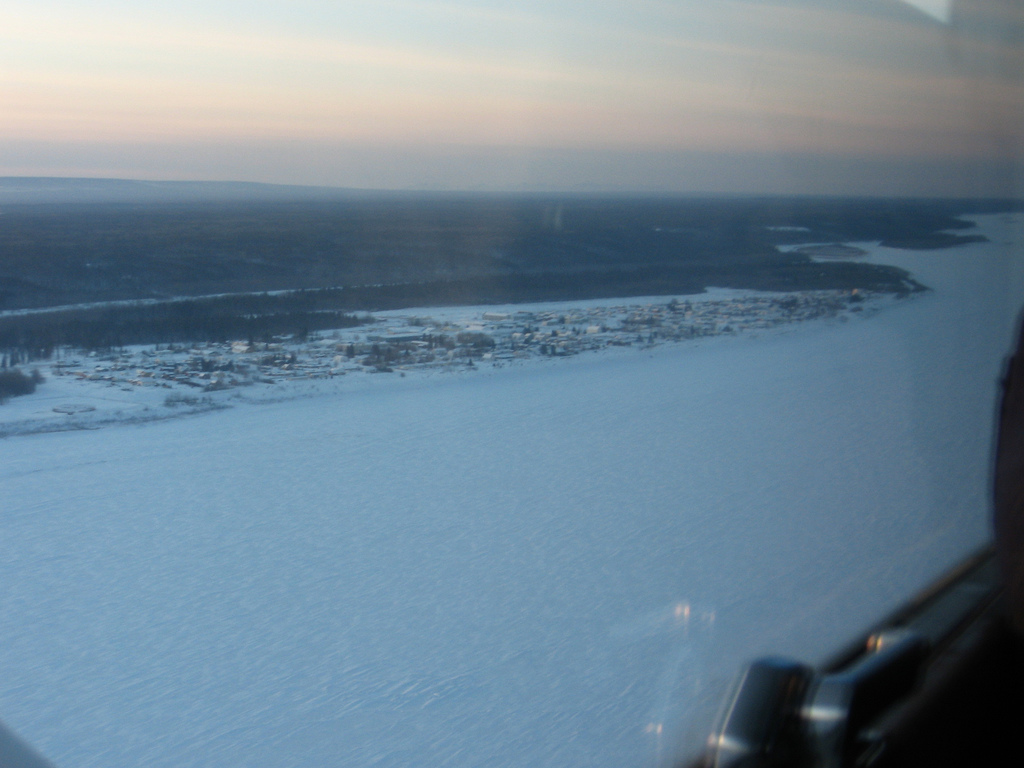

- Coat of arms

- Location within Northwest Territories Location within Canada
- Coordinates: 61°51′39″N 121°21′10″W
- Country: Canada
- Territory: Northwest Territories
- Region: Dehcho Region
- Constituency: Nahendeh
- Census division: Region 4
- Settled: 1803
- Village: 1822
- Village (incorporated): 1 January 1973

Government
  - Mayor: Les Wright
  - Senior Administrative Officer: Darrell White
  - MLA: Shane Thompson

Area
  - Land: 77.89 km^{2} (30.07 sq mi)
- Elevation: 169 m (554 ft)

Population (2021)
  - Total: 1,100
  - Density: 14.1/km^{2} (37/sq mi)
- Time zone: UTC−06:00 (Northwest Territories Time)
- Canadian Postal code: X0E 0N0
- Area code: 867
- Telephone exchange: 695
- Living cost (2018): 142.5^{A}
- Food price index (2019): 147.6^{B}
- Website: www.fort-Simpson.com
- Sources: Department of Municipal and Community Affairs, Prince of Wales Northern Heritage Centre, Canada Flight Supplement^A2018 figure based on Edmonton = 100^B2019 figure based on Yellowknife = 100

Fort Simpson (Slavey language: Łı́ı́dlı̨ı̨ Kų́ę́ "place where rivers come together") is a village, the only one in the entire territory, in the Dehcho Region of the Northwest Territories, Canada. The community is located on an island at the confluence of the Mackenzie and Liard rivers. It is approximately 600 km (370 mi) west of Yellowknife. Both rivers were traditionally trade routes for the Hudson's Bay Company and the native Dene people of the area.

Fort Simpson is the regional centre of the Dehcho and is the gateway to the scenic South Nahanni River and the Nahanni National Park Reserve. Fort Simpson can be reached by air, water and road and has full secondary and elementary school service. The Mackenzie Highway was extended to Fort Simpson in 1970–1971.

The central section of the community is on an island near the south bank of the Mackenzie River, but industrial areas and rural residential areas are located along the highway as far as the Fort Simpson Airport, just beyond which is the Liard River ferry crossing.

== History ==
Fort Simpson was first started as a fur trading site in 1803 then named Fort of the Forks. The Village of Fort Simpson was a permanent settlement in July 1822 when the Hudson's Bay Company constructed a trading post, naming it for George Simpson, then the Governor of Rupert's Land. Until 1910 Fort Simpson was "a company town", with some participation by the Anglican and Roman Catholic Missions. The Dené know it as Łı́ı́dlı̨ı̨ Kų́ę́, meaning the place where the rivers come together. It was designated a National Historic Site of Canada in 1969.

Pope John Paul II attempted to visit the community in September 1984 as part of his Canadian tour, but was prevented from landing due to fog; in an address over the radio from Yellowknife, he promised to visit in the future. He did so in September 1987 near the end of the tour of the United States, making a side trip to Fort Simpson.

== Culture ==
There are two main annual festivals which occur in Fort Simpson.

The first which is held in March is known as the "Beavertail Jamboree". This is a winter carnival which includes traditional games, snowmobile races, and talent shows.

The other festival is the "Open Sky Festival" which is held annually on or around the Canada Day long weekend. The Open Sky Festival is a multi-disciplinary arts festival which has occurred annually since 2001. Festival events include musical, theatrical, and other performances as well as traditional Dehcho Dene Crafts, visual arts, new media exhibitions, workshops, and demonstrations. The Open Sky festival is hosted by the Open Sky Creative Society, a multi-disciplinary arts organization serving artists working in the Dehcho region.

The Dene of the community are represented by the Łı́ı́dlı̨ı̨ Kų́ę́ First Nation and the Métis by Fort Simpson Métis Local 52. Both groups belong to the Dehcho First Nations.

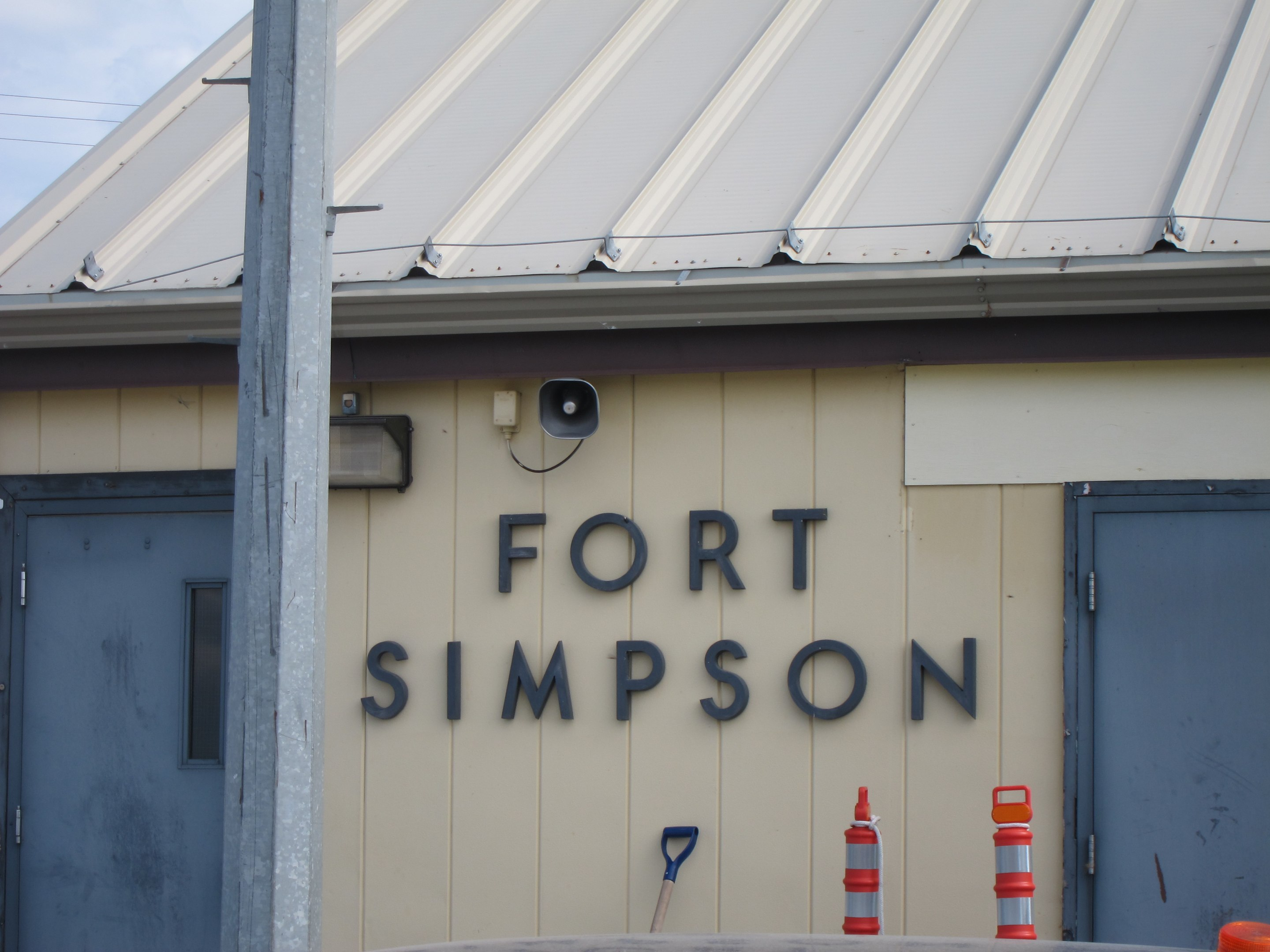
Welcome to Fort Simpson

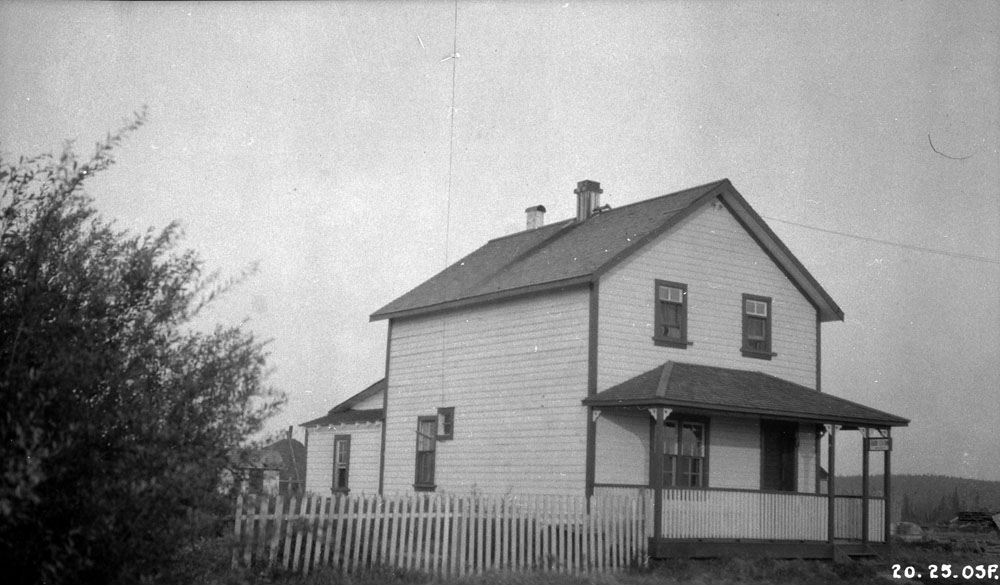
Radio Station, Fort Simpson, circa 1925

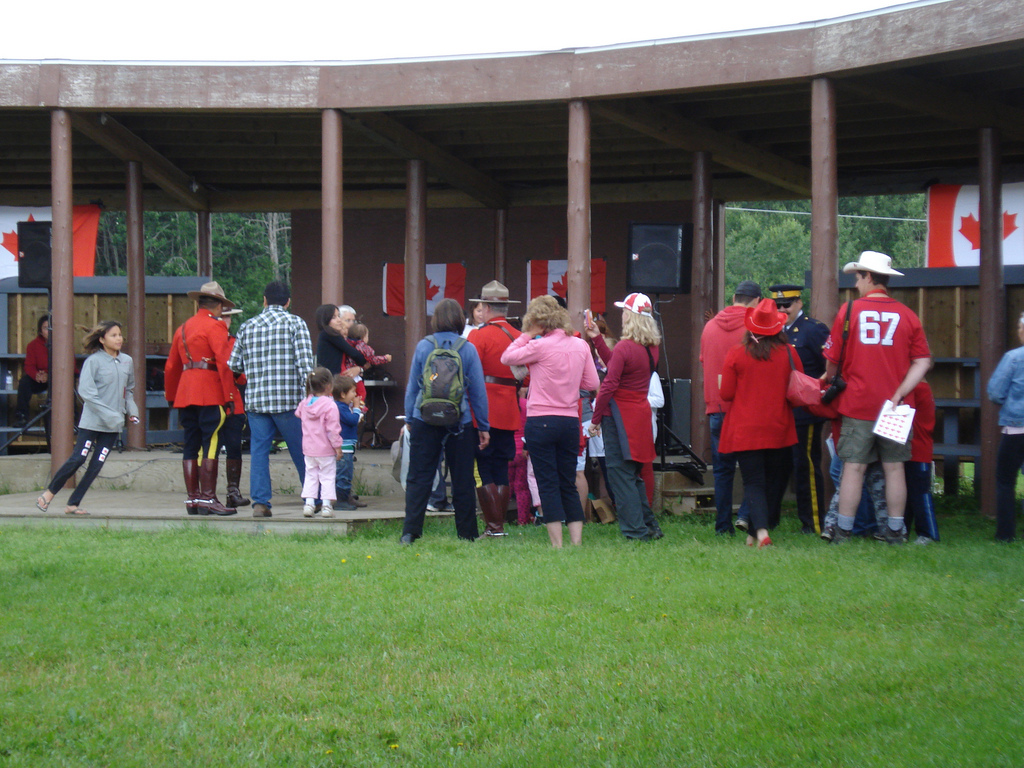
Ehdaa National Historic Site of Canada on Canada Day 2011

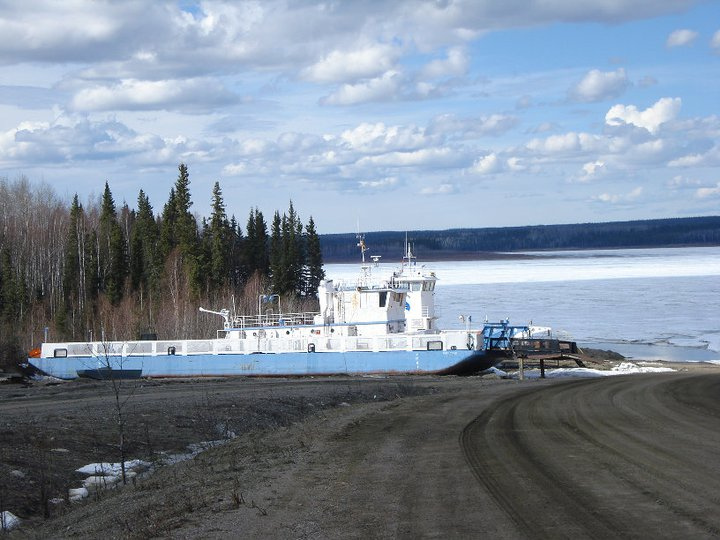
Lafferty ferry dry docked for winter

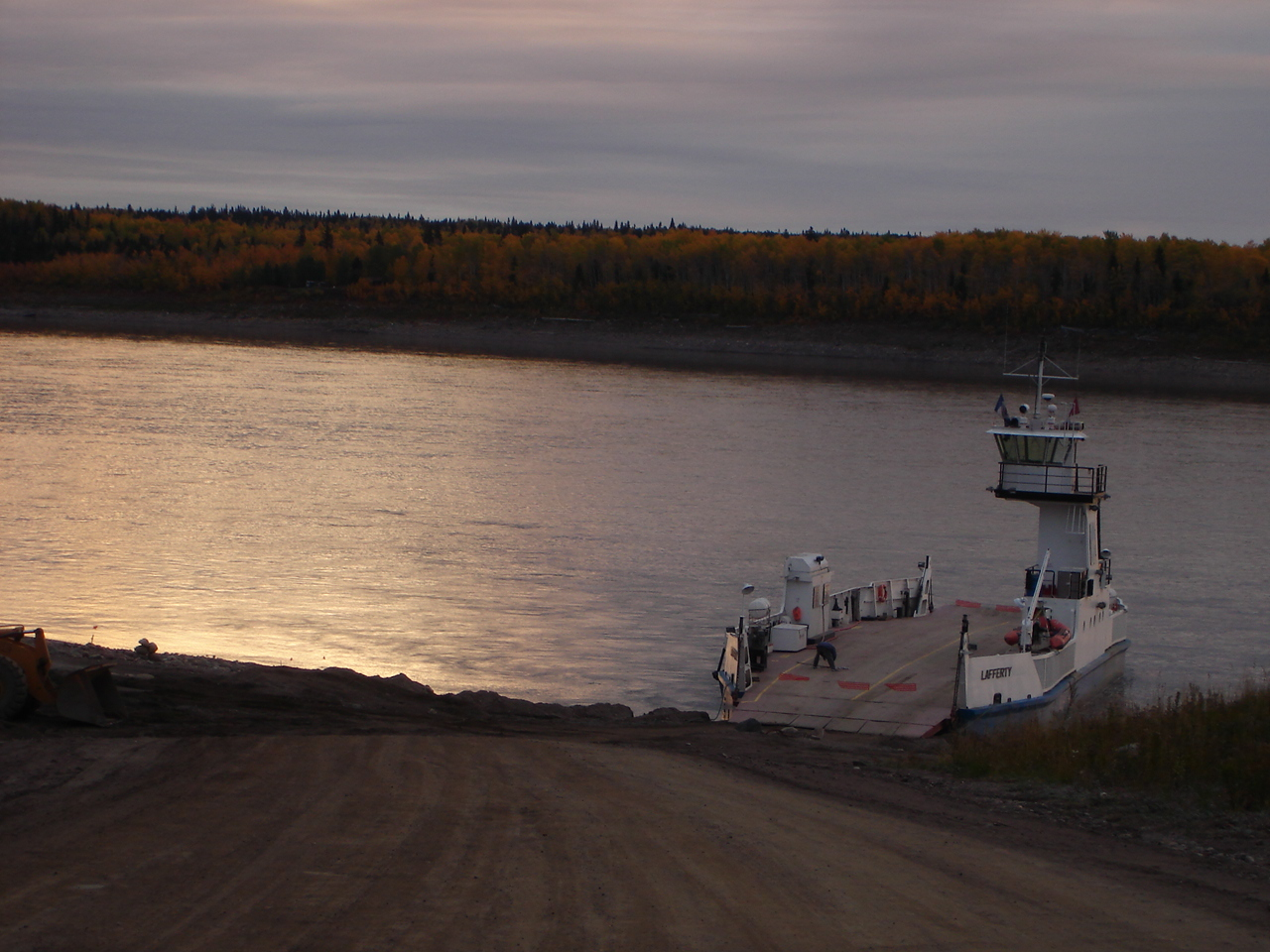
Liard River ferry Lafferty

== Demographics ==
In the 2021 Census of Population conducted by Statistics Canada, Fort Simpson had a population of 1,100 living in 452 of its 572 total private dwellings, a change of −8.5% from its 2016 population of 1,202. With a land area of 77.89 km^{2} (30.07 sq mi), it had a population density of 14.1/km^{2} (36.6/sq mi) in 2021.

In 2016, 890 people identified as Indigenous peoples. Of these the majority, 770, of the residents are First Nations with 95 Métis and 20 Inuit. The main languages are South Slavey and English.

Federal census population history of Fort Simpson
Year	Pop.	±%
1956	495	—
1961	563	+13.7%
1966	712	+26.5%
1971	747	+4.9%
1976	1,136	+52.1%
1981	980	−13.7%
1986	987	+0.7%
1991	1,142	+15.7%
1996	1,257	+10.1%
2001	1,163	−7.5%
2006	1,216	+4.6%
2011	1,238	+1.8%
2016	1,202	−2.9%
2021	1,100	−8.5%
Source: Statistics Canada

Annual population estimates

Year	Pop.	±%
1996	1,307	—
1997	1,295	−0.9%
1998	1,259	−2.8%
1999	1,266	+0.6%
2000	1,238	−2.2%
2001	1,261	+1.9%
2002	1,261	+0.0%
2003	1,254	−0.6%
2004	1,238	−1.3%
2005	1,242	+0.3%
2006	1,257	+1.2%
2007	1,237	−1.6%

Year	Pop.	±%
2008	1,247	+0.8%
2009	1,270	+1.8%
2010	1,276	+0.5%
2011	1,279	+0.2%
2012	1,260	−1.5%
2013	1,232	−2.2%
2014	1,233	+0.1%
2015	1,229	−0.3%
2016	1,207	−1.8%
2017	1,174	−2.7%
2018	1,254	+6.8%
2019	1,250	−0.3%

Sources: NWT Bureau of Statistics (2008 - 2019), NWT Bureau of Statistics (2001 - 2017)

Panethnic groups in the Village of Fort Simpson (2001−2021)
Panethnic group	2021		2016		2011		2006		2001	
Panethnic group	Pop.	%	Pop.	%	Pop.	%	Pop.	%	Pop.	%
Indigenous	825	76.39%	890	75.42%	950	73.08%	825	69.04%	795	69.13%
European (Note: Statistic includes all persons that did not make up part of a visible minority or an indigenous identity.)	225	20.83%	260	22.03%	315	24.23%	350	29.29%	340	29.57%
African	20	1.85%	0	0%	10	0.77%	0	0%	10	0.87%
Southeast Asian (Note: Statistic includes total responses of "Filipino" and "Southeast Asian" under visible minority section on census.)	10	0.93%	10	0.85%	10	0.77%	10	0.84%	0	0%
South Asian	0	0%	10	0.85%	0	0%	0	0%	0	0%
East Asian (Note: Statistic includes total responses of "Chinese", "Korean", and "Japanese" under visible minority section on census.)	0	0%	0	0%	20	1.54%	20	1.67%	10	0.87%
Middle Eastern (Note: Statistic includes total responses of "West Asian" and "Arab" under visible minority section on census.)	0	0%	0	0%	0	0%	0	0%	0	0%
Latin American	0	0%	0	0%	0	0%	0	0%	0	0%
Other/multiracial (Note: Statistic includes total responses of "Visible minority, n.i.e." and "Multiple visible minorities" under visible minority section on census.)	0	0%	10	0.85%	0	0%	10	0.84%	0	0%
Total responses	1,080	98.18%	1,180	98.17%	1,300	105.01%	1,195	98.27%	1,150	98.88%
Total population	1,100	100%	1,202	100%	1,238	100%	1,216	100%	1,163	100%
Note: Totals greater than 100% due to multiple origin responses

== Climate ==
Fort Simpson has a subarctic climate (Köppen Dfc) with long, cold winters and warm but short summers. July temperatures are unusually warm for such northerly areas, which demonstrates the extreme continental nature of the area's climate. However, the heat quickly turns into cold winters when daylight hours turn drastically shorter. Transition seasons are extremely short, and the year is on average dominated by the winter and to a lesser extent, summer. The average monthly temperatures range from −23.6 °C (−10.5 °F) in January to 17.7 °C (63.9 °F) in July. Most of the precipitation falls during the summer months.

The highest temperature ever recorded in Fort Simpson was 36.6 °C (97.9 °F) on 25 July 1994 and 13 July 2014. The coldest temperature ever recorded was −56.1 °C (−69.0 °F) on 1 February 1947.

Climate data for Fort Simpson (Fort Simpson Airport) WMO ID: 71946; coordinates 61°45′37″N 121°14′12″W; elevation: 169.2 m (555 ft); 1991–2020 normals, extremes 1895–present (Note: Climate data was recorded in Fort Simpson from November 1895 to October 1963 and at Fort Simpson Airport from November 1963 to present. Composite data from Fort Simpson Airport; WMO ID: 71946; coordinates 61°45′37″N 121°14′12″W; elevation: 169.5 m (556 ft) and Fort Simpson Climate; WMO ID: 71365; coordinates 61°45′37″N 121°14′12″W; elevation: 168.0 m (551.2 ft). Sunshine from 1981–2010)
Month	Jan	Feb	Mar	Apr	May	Jun	Jul	Aug	Sep	Oct	Nov	Dec	Year
Record high humidex	12.0	13.9	16.5	26.4	31.8	35.8	41.3	39.7	32.2	24.0	11.3	14.0	41.3
Record high °C (°F)	13.2 (55.8)	15.6 (60.1)	17.2 (63.0)	25.5 (77.9)	32.8 (91.0)	35.0 (95.0)	36.6 (97.9)	35.4 (95.7)	30.9 (87.6)	30.6 (87.1)	13.3 (55.9)	14.5 (58.1)	36.6 (97.9)
Mean daily maximum °C (°F)	−19.3 (−2.7)	−14.2 (6.4)	−6.0 (21.2)	5.7 (42.3)	15.9 (60.6)	21.9 (71.4)	23.8 (74.8)	21.1 (70.0)	14.1 (57.4)	2.4 (36.3)	−10.6 (12.9)	−17.5 (0.5)	3.1 (37.6)
Daily mean °C (°F)	−23.6 (−10.5)	−19.5 (−3.1)	−12.5 (9.5)	−0.5 (31.1)	9.3 (48.7)	15.6 (60.1)	17.7 (63.9)	15.1 (59.2)	8.5 (47.3)	−1.4 (29.5)	−14.5 (5.9)	−21.6 (−6.9)	−2.3 (27.9)
Mean daily minimum °C (°F)	−27.8 (−18.0)	−24.7 (−12.5)	−19.1 (−2.4)	−6.7 (19.9)	2.8 (37.0)	9.2 (48.6)	11.5 (52.7)	9.0 (48.2)	2.9 (37.2)	−5.1 (22.8)	−18.4 (−1.1)	−25.7 (−14.3)	−7.7 (18.1)
Record low °C (°F)	−54.4 (−65.9)	−56.2 (−69.2)	−46.7 (−52.1)	−39.4 (−38.9)	−22.8 (−9.0)	−2.2 (28.0)	−1.1 (30.0)	−6.1 (21.0)	−20.6 (−5.1)	−27.8 (−18.0)	−46.1 (−51.0)	−53.3 (−63.9)	−53.3 (−63.9)
Record low wind chill	−58.9	−54.8	−48.5	−44.3	−24.7	−5.9	−2.7	−4.9	−23.7	−35.5	−53.2	−59.6	−59.6
Average precipitation mm (inches)	18.1 (0.71)	16.2 (0.64)	14.8 (0.58)	15.5 (0.61)	30.3 (1.19)	55.8 (2.20)	56.5 (2.22)	59.5 (2.34)	32.4 (1.28)	31.9 (1.26)	22.3 (0.88)	17.4 (0.69)	370.5 (14.59)
Average rainfall mm (inches)	0.1 (0.00)	0.1 (0.00)	0.2 (0.01)	1.5 (0.06)	23.8 (0.94)	57.2 (2.25)	59.2 (2.33)	64.5 (2.54)	31.3 (1.23)	12.1 (0.48)	0.2 (0.01)	0.0 (0.0)	249.9 (9.84)
Average snowfall cm (inches)	30.9 (12.2)	25.6 (10.1)	20.0 (7.9)	17.8 (7.0)	8.1 (3.2)	0.6 (0.2)	0.0 (0.0)	0.0 (0.0)	3.9 (1.5)	24.1 (9.5)	36.4 (14.3)	27.8 (10.9)	195.2 (76.9)
Average precipitation days (≥ 0.2 mm)	12.6	11.0	9.5	6.1	8.5	11.7	12.0	11.8	10.4	12.1	11.9	11.7	129.0
Average rainy days (≥ 0.2 mm)	0.2	0.1	0.3	1.0	7.2	11.0	12.0	11.6	9.8	4.6	0.3	0.0	58.1
Average snowy days (≥ 0.2 cm)	12.6	11.6	9.6	4.9	2.2	0.1	0.0	0.1	1.4	8.7	12.8	12.3	76.0
Average relative humidity (%) (at 1500 LST)	78.4	75.3	66.1	50.6	41.2	44.9	49.9	53.6	58.2	76.4	82.4	80.2	63.1
Mean monthly sunshine hours	55.7	95.1	180.6	248.6	293.4	313.0	307.1	263.8	163.9	77.8	49.4	30.0	2,078.3
Percentage possible sunshine	28.5	38.0	49.6	56.3	53.8	53.7	53.3	53.4	42.0	25.0	22.8	17.7	41.2
Source: Environment and Climate Change Canada (January minimum) (February maximum / minimum) (March minimum) (April minimum) (May minimumm) (June maximum) (August minimum) (October maximum / minimum) (November maximum / minimum) (December minimum) (sunshine)

== Notable residents ==
- Jim Antoine, eighth premier of the Northwest Territories
- William Lafferty, politician, Canadian Forces officer and newspaper columnist
- Melaw Nakehk'o, actress, artist, and activist
- Nick Sibbeston, fourth premier of the Northwest Territories.
- Dahti Tsetso, Tłı̨chǫ environmentalist and educator, born in Fort Simpson

== See also ==
- List of municipalities in the Northwest Territories
- Fort Simpson Island Airport
- Fort Simpson Island Water Aerodrome
- Fort Simpson/Canadian Helicopters Heliport
- Fort Simpson/(Great Slave) Heliport
