= Jean Marie River First Nation =

Jean Marie River First Nation Band No. 770 Tthets'ék'ehdélı̨
- People: Dene
- Treaty: Treaty 11
- Headquarters: Jean Marie River
- Territory: Northwest Territories

Population (2019)
- On other land: 126
- Off reserve: 33
- Total population: 159

Government
- Chief: Melania Norwegian Menacho
- Council: Howard Gargan, Ericson Sanguez, Nolene Hardisty, Misty Ireland, Rhonda Grossetete, Margaret Ireland

Tribal Council
- Dehcho First Nations

Website
- jmrfn.com

The Jean Marie River First Nation, known as Tthets'ék'ehdélı̨ in its own Dene language, is a First Nations band government in the Northwest Territories. The band is headquartered in the community of Jean Marie River.

The Jean Marie River First Nation is a member of the Dehcho First Nations.
