= Gwich'in Tribal Council =

Gwichʼin Tribal Council
- Indigenous organization
- Symbol

- GTC jurisdiction
- Country: Canada
- Territory: Northwest Territories
- Territorial riding: Mackenzie Delta
- Established: April 22, 1992

Government
  - Grand Chief: Frederick Blake Jr.
  - Communities: Aklavik; Fort McPherson; Inuvik; Tsiigehtchic

Population (2016)
  - Total: 1,860
- Time zone: UTC−06:00 (Northwest Territories Time)
- Website: Official website

The Gwichʼin Tribal Council is a First Nations organization representing the Gwichʼin people in the Mackenzie River Delta of the Northwest Territories. It was created in 1992 with the final ratification of the Gwichʼin Comprehensive Land Claim Agreement with the Government of Canada. Negotiations to achieve a Final Agreement, and thus, Gwichʼin self-government, are ongoing.

== History ==
The Gwichʼin people have been present in Alaska, Yukon, and the Northwest Territories since time immemorial. In 1921, chiefs and headmen representing the Gwichʼin (then known as the Loucheux) population in the Mackenzie-Delta signed Treaty 11, but unresolved differences arose between the interpretation of aboriginal and treaty rights by the Gwichʼin and by Canada, and many obligations were never fulfilled. To provide certainty and clarity of rights to land ownership, and to ensure various rights and benefits to the Gwichʼin people, the Comprehensive Land Claim Agreement was signed as a modern treaty on April 22, 1992.

In September 2023, the Biden administration cancelled oil and gas leases in the Arctic National Wildlife Refuge, for which Bernadette Demientieff, executive director of the Gwich’in Steering Committee, thanked the administration.

== Designated Gwich'in Organizations ==
The Gwitch'in Tribal Council represents the four Gwitch'in communities in the Gwitch'in Settlement Area of the Northwest Territories, known as Designated Gwich'in Organizations (DGOs):

- Ehdiitat Gwich'in Council (Aklavik First Nation, Aklavik)
- Gwichya Gwich'in Council (Gwichya Gwich'in First Nation, Tsiigehtchic)
- Nihtat Gwich'in Council (Inuvik Native Band, Inuvik)
- Tetlin Gwich'in Council (Tetlit Gwich'in First Nation, Fort McPherson)

Gwitch'in communities in Alaska and Yukon are not members of the Gwitch'in Tribal Council.

== Powers and responsibilities ==
Although not a full self-government, the Gwichʼin Tribal Council has authority over planning and conservation within its jurisdiction, and exercises full ownership of various lands and organizations. These holdings include subsurface rights to certain parcels in the NWT, as well as the Gwichʼin Development Corporation and Gwichʼin Settlement Corporation. An additional Yukon Transboundary Agreement extends some of these rights into a part of neighbouring Yukon, provided that other First Nations in that jurisdiction are co-operated with.
