= Sambaa K'e First Nation =

Sambaa Kʼe First Nation Band No. 767
- People: Dene
- Treaty: Treaty 11
- Headquarters: Sambaa Kʼe
- Territory: Northwest Territories

Population (2019)
- On other land: 103
- Off reserve: 16
- Total population: 119

Government
- Chief: Dolphus Jumbo

Tribal Council
- Dehcho First Nations

The Sambaa Kʼe First Nation is a Dene First Nations band government in the Northwest Territories. The band is headquartered in the community of Sambaa Kʼe, formerly Trout Lake.

The Sambaa Kʼe First Nation is a member of the Dehcho First Nations.
