= Nahanni Butte =

Nahanni Butte Tthenáágó
- First Nations/Dene Band - Designated Authority (Nahanni Butte Dene Band)
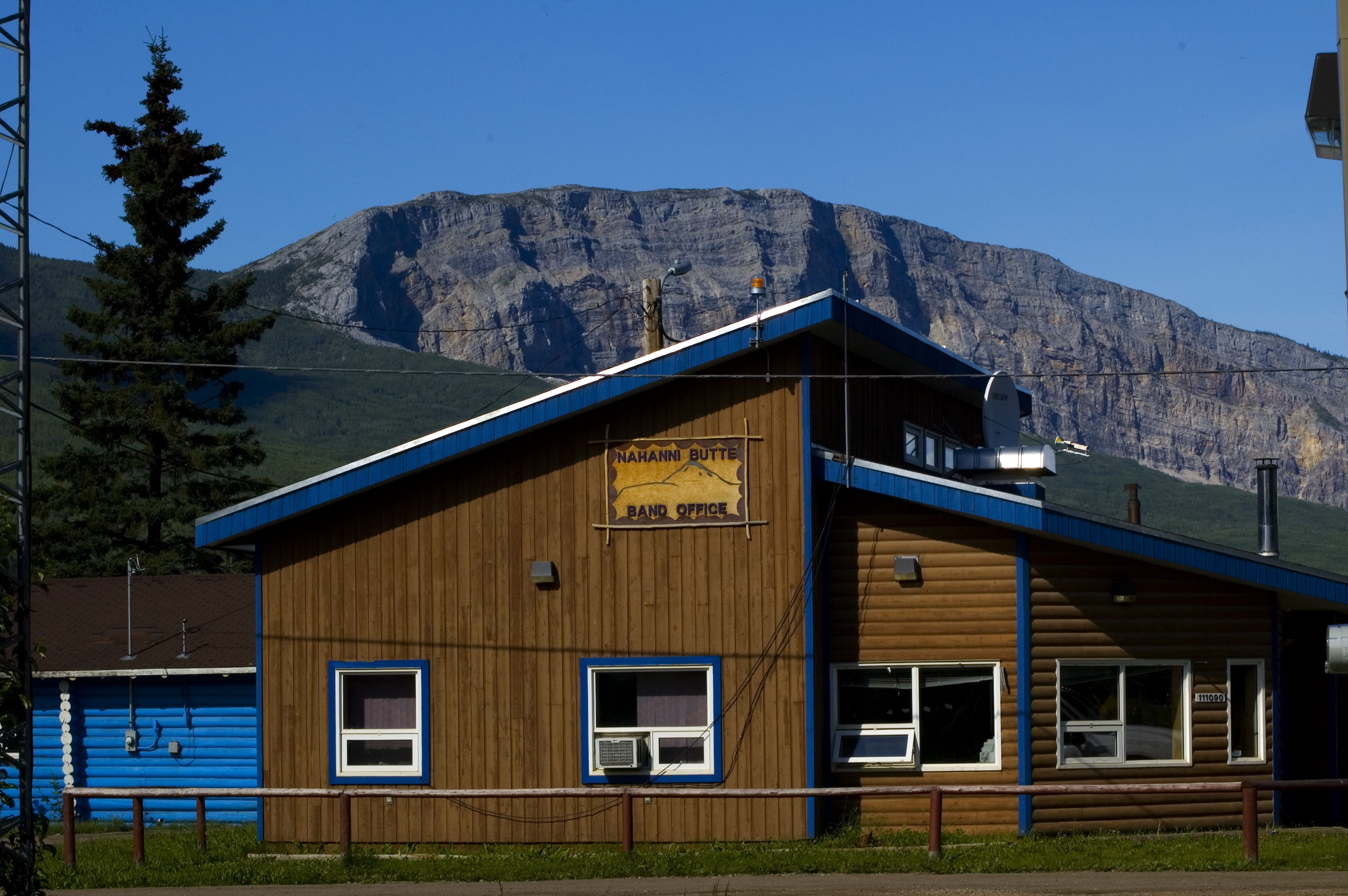
- The Band Office in Nahanni Butte

- Location within Northwest Territories Location within Canada
- Coordinates: 61°02′02″N 123°22′50″W
- Country: Canada
- Territory: Northwest Territories
- Region: Dehcho Region
- Constituency: Nahendeh
- Census division: Region 4

Government
  - Chief: Steve Vital
  - Band Manager: Soham Srimani
  - MLA: Shane Thompson

Area
  - Land: 78.99 km^{2} (30.50 sq mi)
- Elevation: 182 m (597 ft)

Population (2016)
  - Total: 87
  - Density: 1.1/km^{2} (2.8/sq mi)
- Time zone: UTC−07:00 (MST)
  - Summer (DST): UTC−06:00 (MDT)
- Canadian Postal code: X0E 0C1 & X0E 2N0
- Area code: 867
- Telephone exchange: 602
- Living cost: 147.5^{A}
- Food price index: 139.4^{B}
- Sources: Department of Municipal and Community Affairs, Prince of Wales Northern Heritage Centre, Canada Flight Supplement^A2013 figure based on Edmonton = 100^B2015 figure based on Yellowknife = 100

Nahanni Butte (/nəˈhæni/ nə-HAN-ee; Slavey language: Tthenáágó [t̪θɛnáːkó] "strong rock") is a "Designated Authority" in the Dehcho Region of the Northwest Territories, Canada. The community is located at the confluence of the Liard and South Nahanni Rivers in the southwestern part of the NWT.

Although it was not normally accessible by road, a winter road was constructed yearly until an all-season road was completed in October 2010 as far as the Liard River. Access from there is by river taxi in summer and ice road in winter; there are no plans for a vehicle ferry.

== History ==
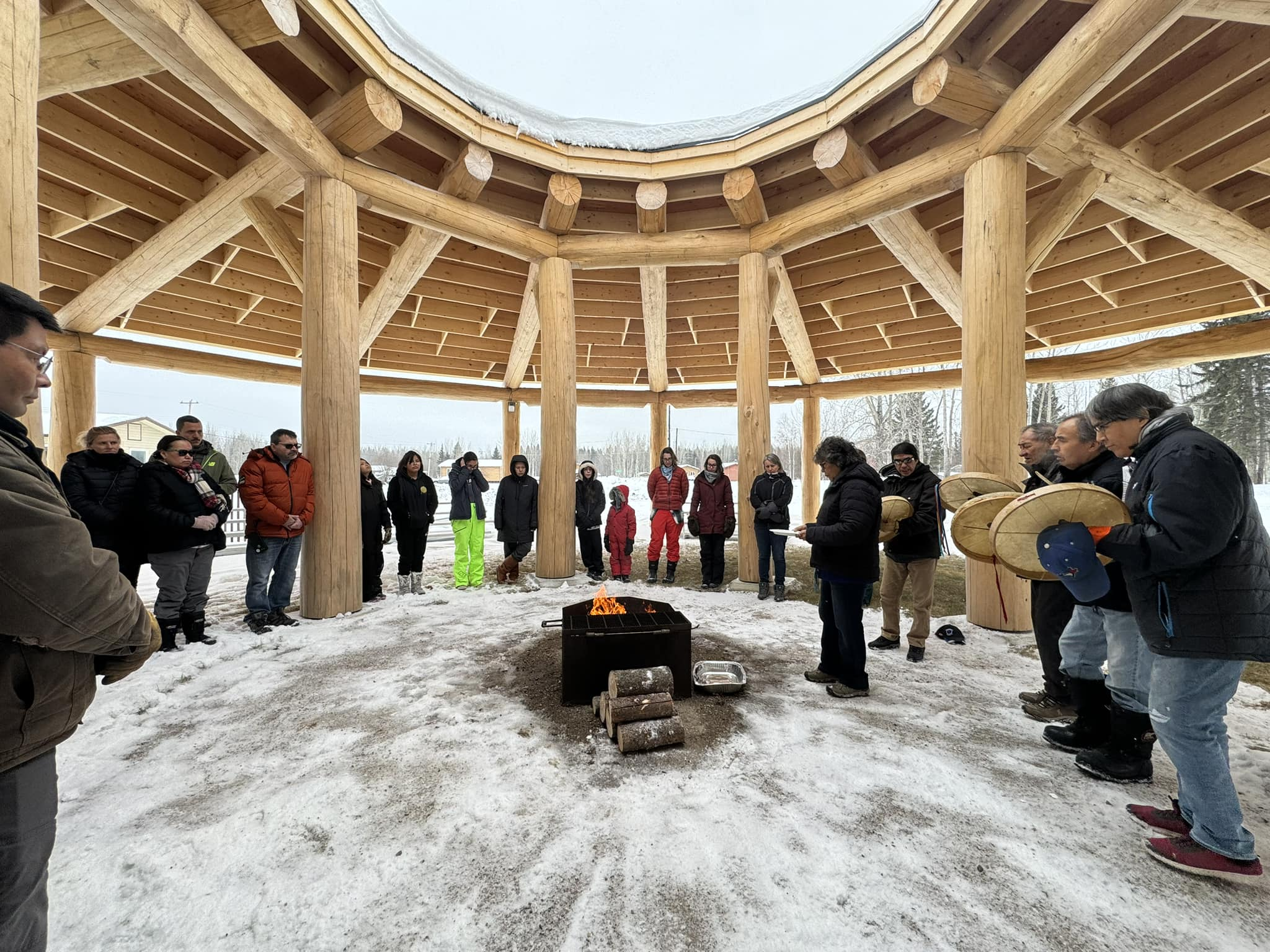
Fire feeding ceremony at the community arbour

=== Pre-European period ===
The Naha and Kaska Dena roamed the area, for what sources point out to be millennia (allegedely up to 10.000 years ago).

Prior to European exposure, the Dene people were highly mobile around the Deh Cho (Mackenzie River) region. Men were mainly hunters, women used to mostly stay at home and do housework. Usually, people would travel in smaller extended-family groups from one place to another, never to settle indefinitely.

The Naha tribe, used to aggressively raid settlements built by the other ethnic groups, leading to a war in an unspecified date which in turn led to the migration of a significant part of the Naha in the area now inhabited by the Navajo.

=== Contemporary period ===
During the 1800s, most Dene families left their nomadic lifestyles and settled into more permanent communities, often close to the trading posts on the banks of the river; however most of the locals only became permanently settled in the late 1950s when the federal government forcefully relocated people from nearby Netla River in the area.

Due to the locals tradition of closeness to nature and sites that are rich in terms of folklore, the area over the 60s generated a folklore of its own and various myths, such as one about a Bigfoot-like creature called a Nuk-luk which was allegedly seen in the area in the year 1964. This tradition of creating rumours and myths regarding the surrounding areas though, seems to be dating as far back as the early 1900s.

== Demographics ==
Federal census population history of Nahanni Butte
Year	Pop.	±%
1976	91	—
1981	85	−6.6%
1986	84	−1.2%
1991	85	+1.2%
1996	75	−11.8%
2001	107	+42.7%
2006	115	+7.5%
2011	102	−11.3%
2016	87	−14.7%
2021	81	−6.9%
Source: Statistics Canada

Annual population estimates

Year	Pop.	±%
1996	75	—
1997	75	+0.0%
1998	82	+9.3%
1999	105	+28.0%
2000	107	+1.9%
2001	111	+3.7%
2002	115	+3.6%
2003	110	−4.3%
2004	110	+0.0%
2005	115	+4.5%
2006	118	+2.6%

Year	Pop.	±%
2007	116	−1.7%
2008	113	−2.6%
2009	110	−2.7%
2010	109	−0.9%
2011	103	−5.5%
2012	98	−4.9%
2013	97	−1.0%
2014	94	−3.1%
2015	92	−2.1%
2016	93	+1.1%
2017	97	+4.3%

Sources: NWT Bureau of Statistics (2001 - 2017)

In the 2021 Census of Population conducted by Statistics Canada, Nahanni Butte had a population of 81 living in 33 of its 39 total private dwellings, a change of −6.9% from its 2016 population of 87. With a land area of 79.42 km^{2} (30.66 sq mi), it had a population density of 1.0/km^{2} (2.6/sq mi) in 2021.

In 2016, there were 80 First Nations people and 40 people speak a Slavey language.

== First Nations ==
The Dene of the community are represented by the Nahɂą Dehé Dene Band and belong to the Dehcho First Nations.

== See also ==
- Nahanni Butte Airport
- Nahanni Butte Water Aerodrome
