= West Point First Nation =

Indigenous Canadian government

West Point First Nation Band No. 772
- People: Dehcho
- Headquarters: Hay River
- Territory: Northwest Territories

Population (2019)
- On reserve: 15
- On other land: 22
- Off reserve: 38
- Total population: 75

Tribal Council
- Dehcho First Nations

The West Point First Nation is a Dehcho First Nations Original Nations band government in the Northwest Territories, Canada. The band is headquartered in the town of Hay River, where its main community is located.

The West Point First Nation is a member of the Dehcho First Nations.
