= Łı́ı́dlı̨ı̨ Kų́ę́ First Nation =

Indigenous peoples of North America

Łı́ı́dlı̨ı̨ Kų́ę́ First Nation Band No. 757
- People: Dene
- Headquarters: Fort Simpson
- Territory: Northwest Territories

Population (2019)
- On other land: 775
- Off reserve: 588
- Total population: 1363

Government
- Chief: Kele Antoine

Tribal Council
- Dehcho First Nations

Website
- liidliikue.ca

The Łı́ı́dlı̨ı̨ Kų́ę́ First Nation is a Dene First Nations band government in the Northwest Territories. The band is headquartered in the community of Fort Simpson (Łı́ı́dlı̨ı̨ Kų́ę́), where 764 of its registered members live.

The Łı́ı́dlı̨ı̨ Kų́ę́ First Nation belongs to the Dehcho First Nations.
