= Dehcho First Nations =

Indigenous tribal council in Canada

The Dehcho First Nations is a tribal council representing the Dene (South Slavey) and Métis people of the Dehcho Region of the Northwest Territories, Canada. It is made up of ten First Nations bands and two Métis Locals.

== Membership ==
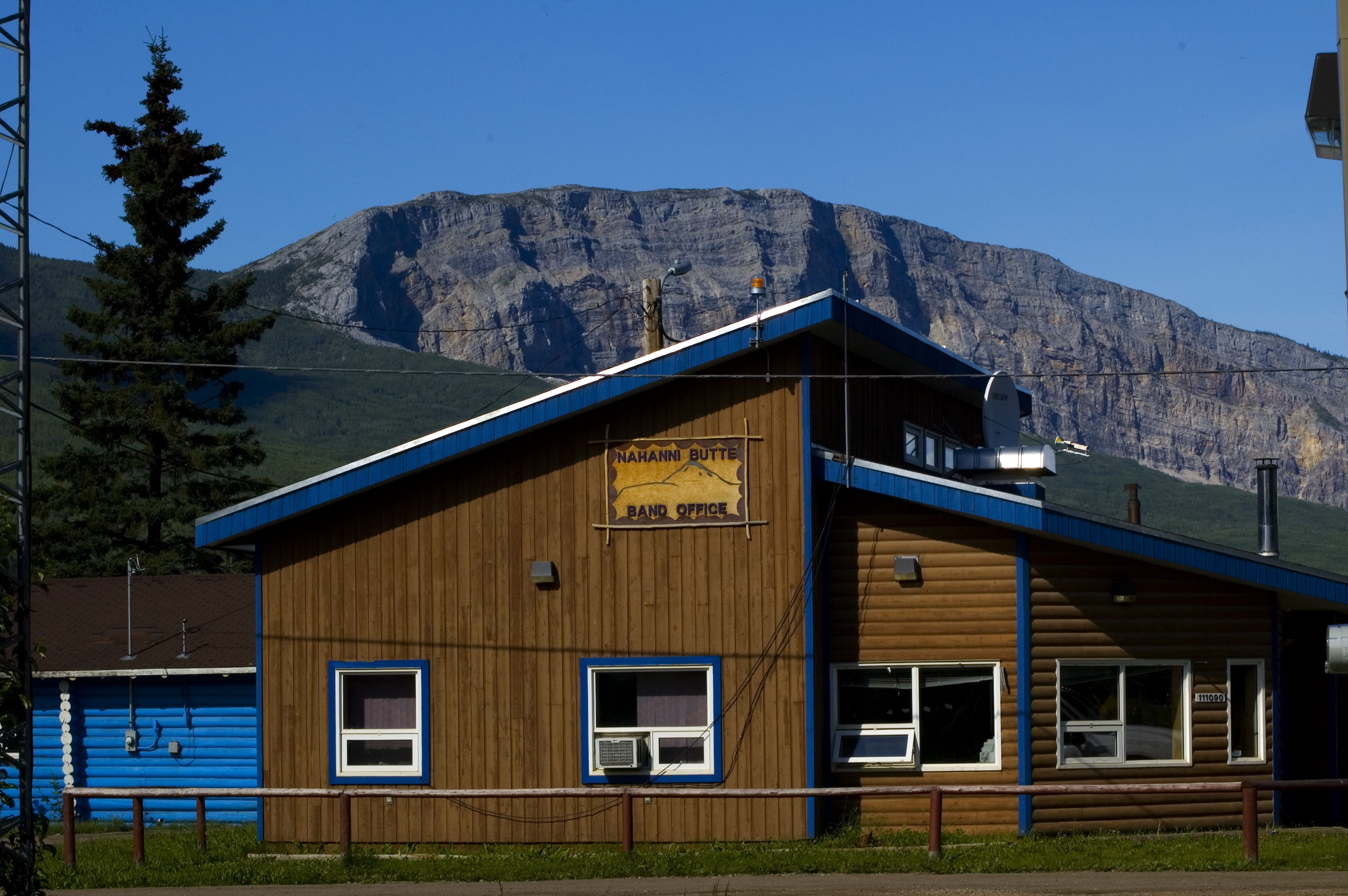
Band Office in Nahanni Butte

The Deh Cho First Nations Tribal Council is made up of several First Nations and Métis locals including:

First Nation Number	Member Name
760	Deh Gáh Got'ı̨ę First Nation - Fort Providence
770	Tthets'ék'ehdélı̨ First Nation - Jean Marie River
768	Ka'a'gee Tu First Nation - Kakisa
757	Łı́ı́dlı̨ı̨ Kų́ę́ First Nation - Fort Simpson
766	Nahɂą Dehé Dene Band- Nahanni Butte
756	Pehdzeh Ki First Nation - Wrigley
767	Sambaa Kʼe First Nation - Sambaa Kʼe
772	West Point First Nation - West Point (Ts’ueh Nda – Spruce Point)
	Fort Providence Métis Council (Local 57) - Fort Providence Métis
	Fort Simpson Métis Nation (Local 52) - Fort Simpson

== Notable members ==
- Dahti Tsetso, environmentalist and educator

== See also ==
- List of tribal councils in British Columbia
