= Pehdzeh Ki First Nation =

Member of the Dehcho First Nations, Canada

The Pehdzeh Ki First Nation is a member of the Dehcho First Nations in the Northwest Territories of Canada. Legally, it is a band administered under the Indian Act.

The Pehdzeh Ki First Nation is located in Wrigley. Wrigley is located along the Mackenzie River, and the Mackenzie Highway ends at Wrigley. Pehdzeh Ki First Nation has over 300 band members but less than half live in the community.

Wrigley is home to a community nursing station, a confectionery store, Chief Julien Yendo School (Grades K-8), a gas station, and a few businesses, including:

- Ma-Dza-She-Deh Venture; contracting services, bobcat, truck, trailer, etc.
- M&M Tours; Jet boat tours & Charters
- Mackenzie Mountain Tours; Tourism & Hospitality
- Raymonds River Taxi; Boat charters
- Charlottes Corner Store
- Beaver Adventures
- Pehdzeh Ki Contractors

The youth in Wrigley are avid drummers and handgame players. They practice at least twice a week amongst themselves.

== Leadership Timeline ==
In September 2004, David Moses was elected to a two-year term as Chief of the First Nation. Darcy E. Moses was elected Chief in 2006. Tim Lennie was elected Chief in 2009, re-elected in 2011, and resigned in 2012. Sharon Pellissey was elected to replace Lennie in July 2012. Pellissey was removed from office later that year, and Lennie returned to the position.

In 2017, Maurice Moses was elected Chief. He was disqualified in October 2020, so the only other candidate, Lloyd Moses, was acclaimed as Chief.
