= Dene =

Indigenous people in northern Canada

- People: Dene
- Country: Denendeh

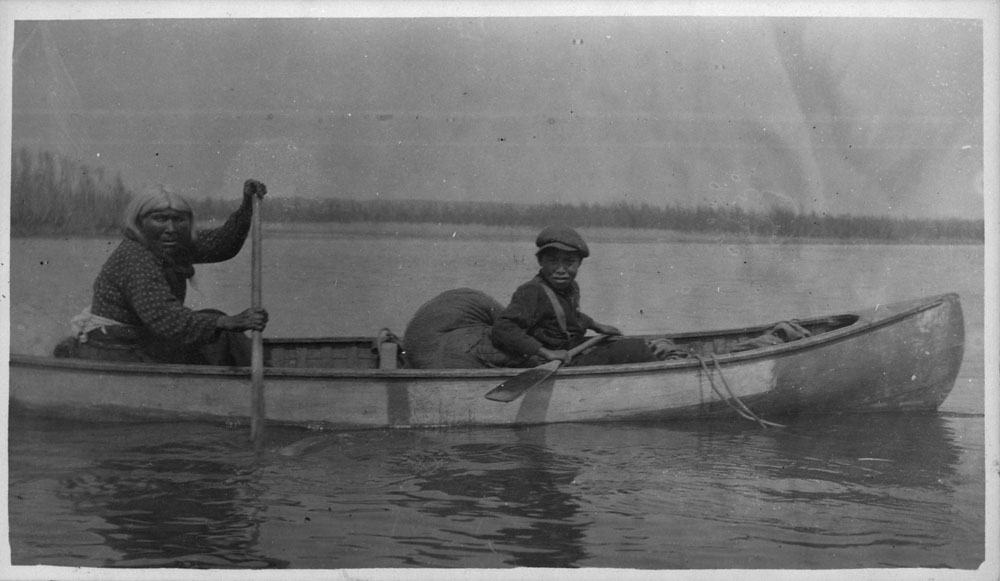
Gahwié got’iné, a Sahtú (North Slavey) people of Canada

The Dene (/ˈdɛneɪ/) are an Indigenous group of First Nations who inhabit the northern boreal, subarctic and Arctic regions of Canada. The Dene speak Northern Athabaskan languages and it is the common Athabaskan word for "people". The term "Dene" has two uses:

Most commonly, "Dene" is used narrowly to refer to the Athabaskan speakers of the Northwest Territories in Canada who form the Dene Nation: the Chipewyan (Denesuline), Tłı̨chǫ (Dogrib), Yellowknives (T'atsaot'ine), Slavey (Deh Gah Got'ine or Deh Cho), Sahtu (Sahtúot’ine), and Gwichʼin (Dinjii Zhuh). (Note: The listed Athabaskan tribes are the Eastern group in Jeff Leer's classification; but in Keren Rice's classification they part of the Northwestern Canada group.)

"Dene" is sometimes also used to refer to all Northern Athabaskan speakers, who are spread in a wide range all across Alaska and northern Canada. (Note: Southern Athabaskan speakers also refer to themselves by similar words: Diné (Navajo) and Indé (Apache).)

The Dene people are known for their oral storytelling.

== Location ==
Dene are spread through a wide region. They live in the Mackenzie Valley (south of the Inuvialuit), and can be found west of Nunavut. Their homeland reaches to western Yukon, and the northern part of British Columbia, Alberta, Saskatchewan, Manitoba, Alaska and the southwestern United States.

Dene were the first people to settle in what is now the Northwest Territories. In northern Canada, historically there were ethnic feuds between the Dene and the Inuit. One such feud was recounted by English explorer Samuel Hearne in 1771 as the Bloody Falls massacre, where a band of Chipewyan and "Copper Indian" Dene men ambushed and killed 20 Inuit camped by the mount of the Coppermine River. In 1996, Dene and Inuit representatives participated in a healing ceremony at Bloody Falls to reconcile the centuries-old grievances.

Behchokǫ̀, Northwest Territories is the largest Dene community in Canada.

== Ethnography ==
The various Dene subdivisions including the Sahtu (North Slavey), Tłı̨chǫ (Dogrib), Gwichʼin, and others.

Flag of the Tłı̨chǫ: symbol with four teepees signifies the four communities of the Tłı̨chǫ nation: Behchokǫ̀, Gamèti, Whatì, and Wekweètì.

The Dene include six main groups:

- Chipewyan (Denesuline), living east of Great Slave Lake, and including the Sayisi Dene living at Tadoule Lake, Manitoba.
- Tłı̨chǫ (Dogrib), living between Great Slave and Great Bear Lakes.
- Yellowknives (T'atsaot'ine), living north of Great Slave Lake.
- Slavey (Deh Gah Got'ine or Deh Cho), living southwest of Great Slave Lake and into Alberta and British Columbia.
- Sahtu (Sahtúot’ine), including the Locheux, Nahanni, and Bear Lake peoples, living along the Mackenzie River (Deh Cho) near Great Bear Lake.
- Gwichʼin (Dinjii Zhuh), in the Gwich'in Settlement Region.

Although the above-named groups are what the term "Dene" usually refers to in modern usage, other groups who consider themselves Dene include:

- Tsuutʼina (Tsuu T'ina), a.k.a. the Sarcee, currently located near Calgary, Alberta.
- The Dane-zaa (Danezaa, Dunne-za, or Tsattine) of northeastern British Columbia and neighbouring regions of northwestern Alberta.
- The Tahltan, Kaska Dena, and Sekani peoples of the northern area of the British Columbia Interior. Another group in this region, the Tsetsaut, lived in the Portland Canal area of the northernmost BC Coast near the border with Alaska. They are now extinct.
- The Dakelh (Carrier) peoples of the northern and central British Columbia Interior, and the Wetʼsuwetʼen, a Dakelh branch
- The Tsilhqotʼin peoples of the eponymous Chilcotin Country of the central British Columbia Interior
- The extinct Nicola Athapaskans, or Stuwix ("strangers" in the Shuswap language), migrated south from northern BC into the Nicola Valley region in the late 18th century and were absorbed into the Nicola people, an alliance of Nlaka'pamux and Syilx (Okanagan peoples).
- The Tanana Athabaskans and other peoples of Yukon and Alaska are also considered to be Dene, which is to say part of the family of Athapaskan-speaking peoples.

In 2005, elders from the Dene People decided to join the Unrepresented Nations and Peoples Organization (UNPO) seeking recognition for their ancestral cultural and land rights.

The largest population of Chipewyan language (Dënesųłinë́ or Dëne) speakers live in the northern Saskatchewan village of La Loche and the adjoining Clearwater River Dene Nation. In 2011, the combined population was 3,389 people. The Dënesųłinë́ language is spoken by 89% of the residents.

== Notable Dene ==
- Thanadelthur (c. 1697 – 5 February 1717) a woman of the Chipewyan Nation, a guide and interpreter, who was instrumental in forging a peace agreement between the Chipewyan and the Cree people
- Ethel Blondin-Andrew, former MP for Western Arctic (Northwest Territories)
- Georges Erasmus, National Chief of the Assembly of First Nations (1985–1991)
- Leela Gilday, Canadian folk singer, Juno winner
- Jimmy Herman (1940–2013) actor, Dances with Wolves
- Matonabbee (c. 1737–1782), guide for Samuel Hearne's expedition to the Coppermine River
- Tahmoh Penikett, actor, Battlestar Galactica and Dollhouse
- Eric Schweig, actor, The Last of the Mohicans
- Jim Boucher, politician, businessman
- Shannon Smallwood, justice of the Supreme Court of the Northwest Territories
- Beʼsha Blondin, elder and founder of the Arctic Indigenous Wellness Foundation
- Glen Coulthard, professor of Indigenous studies and political science at the University of British Columbia
- Chelazon Leroux, drag performer, model

== See also ==
- Alaskan Athabaskans (Alaskan Dene, Tinneh), Athabaskan peoples of the interior of Alaska
- Apache (Inde), southern Athabaskan peoples
- Cahto, California Athabaskan peoples
- Eel River Athapaskan peoples (Wailaki), California Athabaskan peoples
- Galice language-speakers (Oregon Athabaskan): Chetco, Tolowa, Coquille, Tututni
- Hupa, California Athabaskan peoples
- Mattole, California Athabaskan peoples
- Navajo Nation (Diné), southern Athabaskan peoples

== Sources ==
- Sapir, Edward (July–September 1915). "The Na-Dene Languages: A Preliminary Report". American Anthropologist. 17 (3): 534–558. doi:10.1525/aa.1915.17.3.02a00080. JSTOR 660504.
