= Sarah Hardisty =

Dene elder & quillworker (1924–2014)

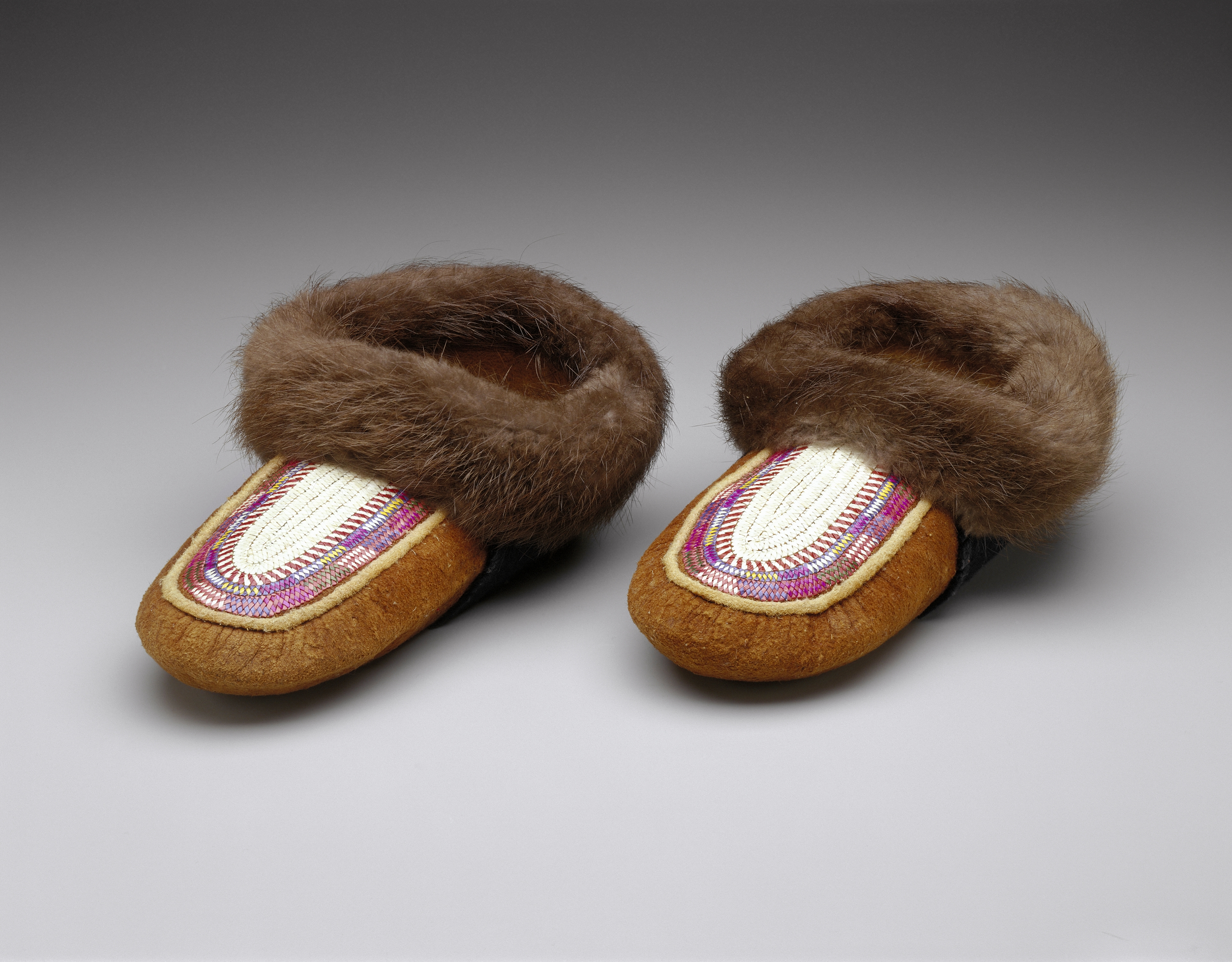
Hardisty crafted these moccasins from moose hide, porcupine quill, beaver hide, wool, and thread.

Sarah Hardisty (1924–2014) was a Dene elder and quillworker.

== Early life ==
Hardisty was born Sarah Sanguez on 17 July 1924 in the Jean Marie River (Tthek'éhdélı̨) community in the Dehcho Region of Canada's Northwest Territories. Joseph Sanguez, her grandfather, built the house where she was born and settled the community. Her family spent their summers in Jean Marie River and wintered at Fish Lake. She started sewing at the age of nine and by the time she was 12 she could prepare and tan a moosehide. She had no formal education and earned income selling handmade traditional clothing and moccasins.

== Family and artwork ==
Sanguez married William Hardisty in 1941. They had 12 children.

Hardisty worked in quillwork, beadwork, and embroidery. She specialized in porcupine quillwork and earned a reputation as one of the best sewers in the region. Her work was included in the 1977 exhibition Contemporary Art of Canada—the Western Subarctic at the Royal Ontario Museum. She was commissioned by the Canadian Museum of History to craft a traditional outfit and gloves for their Dene clothing collection in 1988.

Hardisty taught traditional craftwork at the local school through the 1990s. In 1999, Hardisty led a quillwork workshop in Fort Simpson with Jane Grossetete and Caroline Bonnetrouge. NWT Commissioner Dan Marion presented her with an award from the Dene National Assembly in July 1999. Hardisty also contributed porcupine quillwork for the shaft of the ceremonial Mace of the Northwest Territories, a symbol of the authority of the Legislative Assembly. She was a participating artist in the Open Sky Festivals of 2001 and 2002.

== Later years and legacy ==
She was interviewed for Isuma TV circa 2008. Nahendeh MLA Kevin Menicoche presented Hardisty with a Queen Elizabeth II Diamond Jubilee Medal in 2013.

Hardisty died in Fort Simpson on 9 February 2014.

Mocassins made by Hardisty are part of the collection of the Minneapolis Institute of Arts. The Mashantucket Pequot Museum and Research Center holds in its collection dolls created by Hardisty dressed in traditional clothing.
