= Sambaa K'e (disambiguation) =

Sambaa K'e may refer to:

- Sambaa K'e, a "Designated Authority"in the Dehcho Region of the Northwest Territories, Canada
- Sambaa K'e (lake), a lake in the Dehcho Region of the Northwest Territories of Canada.
- Sambaa K'e First Nation, a Dene First Nations band government in the Northwest Territories.
