= Trout River (Northwest Territories) =

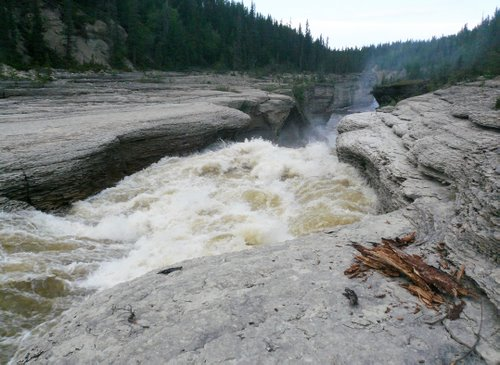
- Rapids on Trout River, from Mackenzie Highway

Location
- Country: Canada
- Territory: Northwest Territories

Physical characteristics
- Source
  - location: Sambaa K'e
  - coordinates: 60.73833°N 121.14756°W
  - elevation: 490 meters (1,610 ft)
- Mouth
  - location: Mackenzie River
  - coordinates: 61.30423°N 119.84453°W
  - elevation: 145 meters (476 ft)

Trout River is a river in the Northwest Territories of Canada. It is a major tributary of the Mackenzie River.

The river gives the name to the Trout River Formation, a stratigraphical unit of the Western Canadian Sedimentary Basin.

== Course ==
The Trout River originates in Sambaa K'e at an elevation of 490 metres (1,610 ft). It flows north and then east, through occasional rapids, receiving the waters from several creeks and lakes. The course becomes meandered before it is crossed by the Mackenzie Highway, where the river turns sharply west, then north. It continues through a 60-metre (200 ft) deep canyon, then empties into the Mackenzie River, 60 kilometres (37 mi) downstream from Jean Marie River and 95 kilometres (59 mi) upstream from Mills Lake, at an elevation of 145 metres (476 ft).

== See also ==
- List of rivers of the Northwest Territories
