= Sambaa K'e =

- First Nation (Designated Authority) (Sambaa K'e Dene Band)
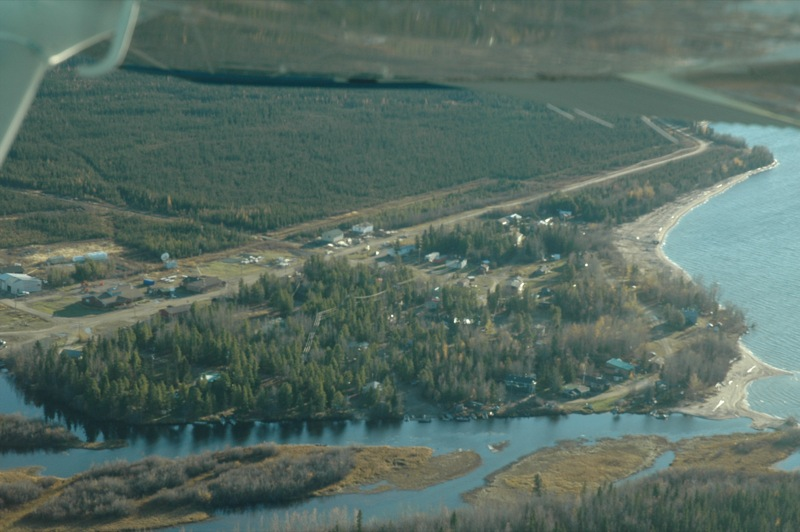

- Location within Northwest Territories Location within Canada
- Coordinates: 60°26′33″N 121°14′43″W
- Country: Canada
- Territory: Northwest Territories
- Region: Dehcho Region
- Constituency: Nahendeh
- Census division: Region 4
- Trading post: 1796
- Settlement: Late 1960s

Government
  - Chief: Dolphus Jumbo
  - Band Manager: Ruby Jumbo
  - MLA: Kevin Menicoche

Area
  - Land: 119.51 km^{2} (46.14 sq mi)
- Elevation: 495 m (1,624 ft)

Population (2016)
  - Total: 88
  - Density: 0.7/km^{2} (1.8/sq mi)
- Time zone: UTC−07:00 (MST)
  - Summer (DST): UTC−06:00 (MDT)
- Canadian Postal code: X0E 1Z0
- Area code: 867
- Telephone exchange: 206
- Living cost: 162.5^{A}
- Food price index: 144.1^{B}
- Sources: Department of Municipal and Community Affairs, Prince of Wales Northern Heritage Centre, Canada Flight Supplement^A2013 figure based on Edmonton = 100^B2015 figure based on Yellowknife = 100

Sambaa K'e (Slavey language: Sambaa K’e [saᵐbaː kʼɛ] "place of trout; formerly Trout Lake) is a "Designated Authority" in the Dehcho Region of the Northwest Territories, Canada. The community is located near the Alberta border, east of Fort Liard, on the shore of the lake also known as Sambaa K'e. It has no all-weather road, but can be reached by winter road early in the year or by air (Sambaa K'e Aerodrome) year-round. This 126 km winter road is typically operational from late December to early April, depending on weather conditions.

On June 21, 2016, the settlement officially changed its name from "Trout Lake" to "Sambaa K'e", its name in the Slavey language, meaning "place of trout".

== Demographics ==
Federal census population history of Sambaa K'e
Year	Pop.	±%
1976	57	—
1981	59	+3.5%
1986	54	−8.5%
1991	66	+22.2%
1996	68	+3.0%
2001	70	+2.9%
2006	86	+22.9%
2011	92	+7.0%
2016	88	−4.3%
2021	97	+10.2%
Source: Statistics Canada

Annual population estimates

Year	Pop.	±%
1996	74	—
1997	74	+0.0%
1998	67	−9.5%
1999	72	+7.5%
2000	69	−4.2%
2001	76	+10.1%
2002	75	−1.3%
2003	78	+4.0%
2004	83	+6.4%
2005	86	+3.6%
2006	91	+5.8%

Year	Pop.	±%
2007	93	+2.2%
2008	97	+4.3%
2009	99	+2.1%
2010	97	−2.0%
2011	95	−2.1%
2012	100	+5.3%
2013	101	+1.0%
2014	102	+1.0%
2015	104	+2.0%
2016	105	+1.0%
2017	106	+1.0%

Sources: NWT Bureau of Statistics (2001 - 2017)

In the 2021 Census of Population conducted by Statistics Canada, Sambaa K’e had a population of 97 living in 49 of its 49 total private dwellings, a change of 10.2% from its 2016 population of 88. With a land area of 118.01 km^{2} (45.56 sq mi), it had a population density of 0.8/km^{2} (2.1/sq mi) in 2021.

The majority of its 2016 population (80 people) are First Nations and 45 report South Slavey as a first language.

== First Nations ==
The Dene of the community are represented by the Sambaa K'e First Nation and belong to the Dehcho First Nations.

== Services ==
The community has a small general store and a health centre and no RCMP. Canada Post mail arrives weekly by charter plane. Residents can order books, movies and CDs through the Borrow by Mail program offered by the NWT Public Library Services. There is a small airport, Sambaa K'e Aerodrome, and in the summer Trout Lake Water Aerodrome is in operation.

The community runs the Sambaa K'e Fishing Lodge, an authentic northern fishing experience, in the summer months.
