= Sambaa K'e (lake) =

Lake in the Northwest Territories, Canada

Sambaa Kʼe
- Trout Lake
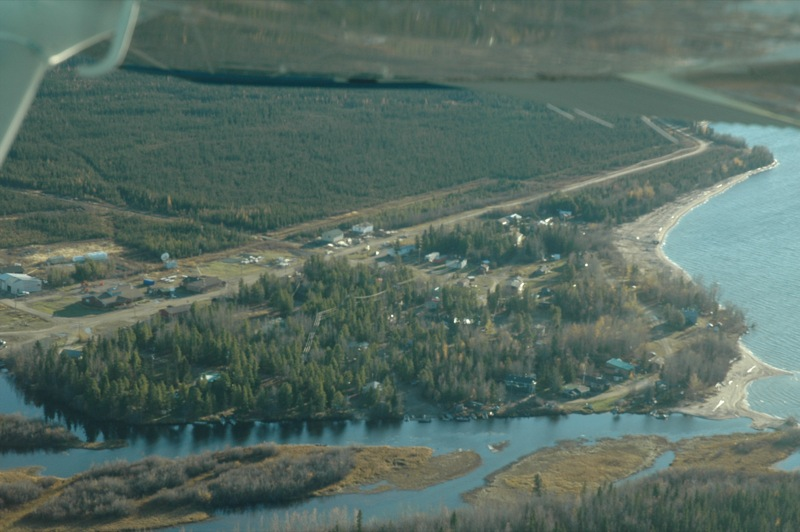
- The settlement of Sambaa Kʼe, on the south shore of the eponymous lake

- Location in the Northwest Territories
- Location: Dehcho Region, Northwest Territories, Canada
- Coordinates: 60.55°N 121.24°W
- Primary inflows: Paradise River East, Island River, Moose River
- Primary outflows: Trout River
- Catchment area: 5,694 km^{2} (2,198 sq mi)
- Basin countries: Canada
- Max. length: 51 km (32 mi)
- Max. width: 15 km (9.3 mi)
- Surface area: 504 km^{2} (195 sq mi)
- Surface elevation: 503 m (1,650 ft)
- Settlements: Sambaa Kʼe

Sambaa K’e (SALM-bah-kay; South Slavey, place of trout) is a lake in the Dehcho Region of the Northwest Territories of Canada. The only settlement on its shores shares the same name; both were officially known as Trout Lake until 2016, when their names were changed to reflect local usage.

Sambaa K’e lies at an elevation of 503 metres (1,650 ft) and is 103 kilometres (64 mi) long and 12 kilometres (7.5 mi) wide, covering an area of 513 square kilometres (198 sq mi). It drains an area of 5,694 square kilometres (2,198 sq mi); major rivers that enter the lake include Paradise River East from the east, Island River from the south (next to the settlement), and Moose River from the north. Trout River, a tributary of the Mackenzie River, exits the lake from the northeast.

Drinking water for the community of Sambaa K’e comes from the local water treatment facility, which draws water from the lake. Known sources of lake water contamination include the local sewage lagoon, hazardous waste from a World War II-era U.S. Air Force outpost on the lake, and diesel leakage from the local power station.

Fishing for lake trout, walleye, northern pike and Arctic grayling draws tourists to the lake. The local people also rely on the lake environment to support the hunting, trapping and fishing activities that comprise a major part of their livelihood. Common traditional food sources include moose, woodland caribou, grouse, porcupine, beaver, trout, pickerel, duck, and various berries. A proposal to create a 10,600-square-kilometre (4,100 sq mi) protected area including the Sambaa K’e watershed is currently under study.
