= Wrigley, Northwest Territories =

Wrigley Pedzéh Kñ
- First Nation (Designated Authority); Pehdzeh Ki First Nation
- Location within Northwest Territories Location within Canada
- Coordinates: 63°13′36″N 123°28′00″W
- Country: Canada
- Territory: Northwest Territories
- Region: Dehcho Region
- Constituency: Nahendeh
- Census division: Region 4
- Settled: 1965

Government
  - Chief: Jamie Moses
  - Community Officer: Derek Sutherland
  - MLA: Shane Thompson

Area
  - Total: 53.93 km^{2} (20.82 sq mi)
- Elevation: 149 m (489 ft)

Population (2021)
  - Total: 117
  - Density: 2.2/km^{2} (5.7/sq mi)
- Time zone: UTC−07:00 (MST)
  - Summer (DST): UTC−06:00 (MDT)
- Canadian Postal code: X0E 1E0
- Telephone exchange: 581
- Living cost: 152.5^{A}
- Food price index: 173.6^{B}
- Sources: Department of Municipal and Community Affairs, Prince of Wales Northern Heritage Centre, Canada Flight Supplement^A2013 figure based on Edmonton = 100^B2015 figure based on Yellowknife = 100

Wrigley (South Slavey language: Pehdzeh Ki "clay place") is a "Designated Authority" in the Dehcho Region of the Northwest Territories, Canada. The Slavey Dene community is located on the east bank of the Mackenzie River, just below its confluence with the Wrigley River and about 466 mi (750 km) northwest of Yellowknife.

Originally situated at Fort Wrigley, 16 km (9.9 mi) downstream, the community relocated to its present location in 1965, in part because it was more easily accessible due to the World War II era Wrigley Airport built for the Canol Project and also due to the swampy nature of the land around Fort Wrigley. Today the community can be reached via the Mackenzie Highway. The population continues to maintain a traditional lifestyle, trapping, hunting, and fishing.

The community was named for Joseph Wrigley who was the Hudson's Bay Company Chief Commissioner for British North America (1884–1891).

The Franklin Mountains, which are also on the east bank of the Mackenzie River, overlook the community. Cap Mountain, 1,228 m (4,029 ft), is the highest peak in the range and is within walking distance of the community. Although not as well known as the Rabbitkettle Hot Springs the Roche qui trempe a l’eau sulphur springs are located downstream of Wrigley.

== Demographics ==
Federal census population history of Wrigley
Year	Pop.	±%
1976	143	—
1981	137	−4.2%
1986	161	+17.5%
1991	174	+8.1%
1996	167	−4.0%
2001	182	+9.0%
2006	122	−33.0%
2011	133	+9.0%
2016	119	−10.5%
2021	117	−1.7%
Source: Statistics Canada

Annual population estimates

Year	Pop.	±%
1996	173	—
1997	183	+5.8%
1998	185	+1.1%
1999	189	+2.2%
2000	193	+2.1%
2001	189	−2.1%
2002	176	−6.9%
2003	168	−4.5%
2004	140	−16.7%
2005	133	−5.0%
2006	129	−3.0%

Year	Pop.	±%
2007	121	−6.2%
2008	128	+5.8%
2009	137	+7.0%
2010	138	+0.7%
2011	138	+0.0%
2012	145	+5.1%
2013	146	+0.7%
2014	149	+2.1%
2015	151	+1.3%
2016	147	−2.6%
2017	135	−8.2%

Sources: NWT Bureau of Statistics (2001–2017)

In the 2021 Census of Population conducted by Statistics Canada, Wrigley had a population of 117 living in 42 of its 63 total private dwellings, a change of −1.7% from its 2016 population of 119. With a land area of 53.93 km^{2} (20.82 sq mi), it had a population density of 2.2/km^{2} (5.6/sq mi) in 2021.

The majority of its 2016 population (110 people) is First Nations and the predominant languages are North and South Slavey and English.

== First Nations ==
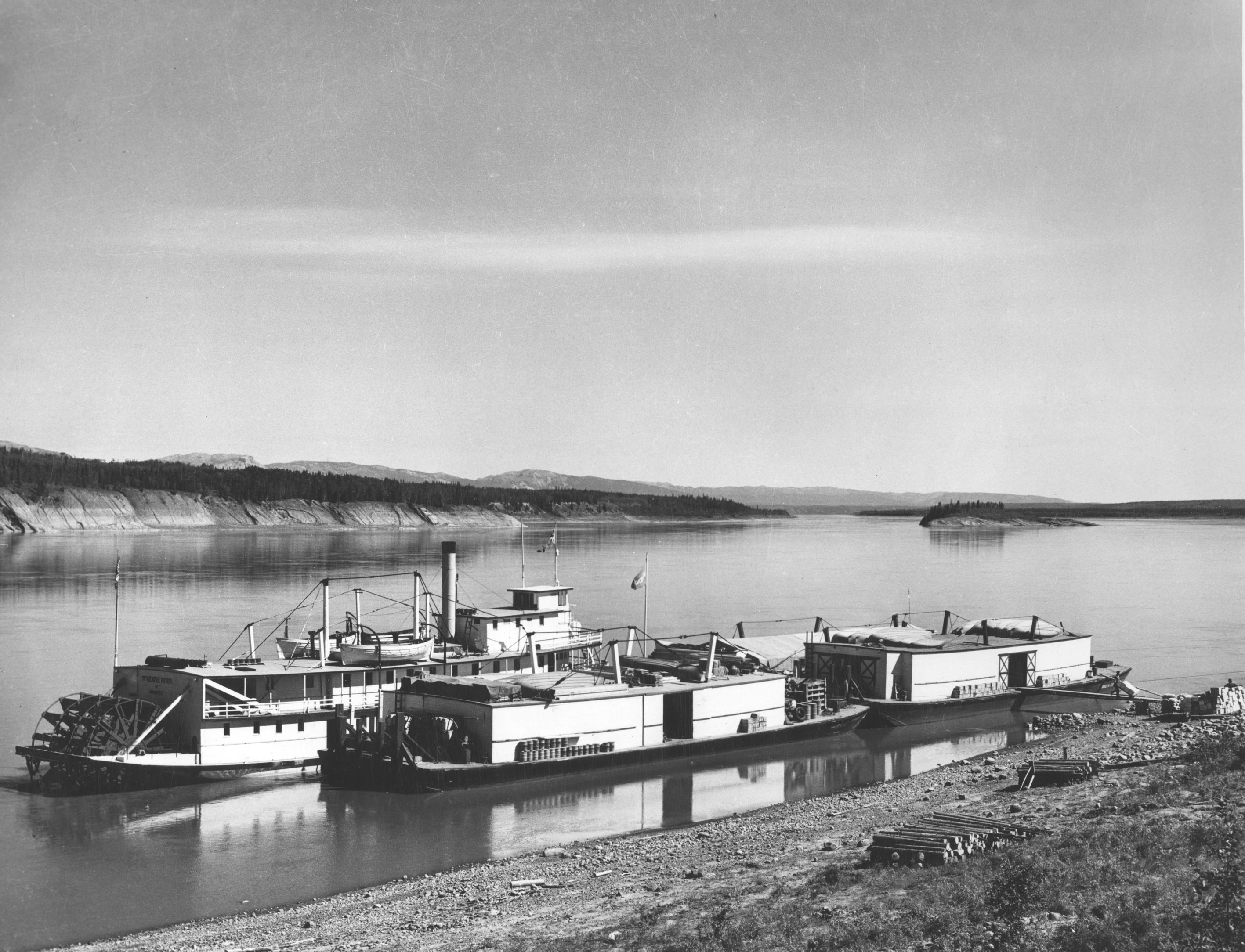
The S.S. Mackenzie River and three barges tied up at Fort Wrigley in 1946

The Dene of the community are represented by the Pehdzeh Ki First Nation and belong to the Dehcho First Nations. The last of the Numbered Treaties, Treaty 11, was signed here 13 July 1921. At that time the Headman was paid $22 and $12 for everybody else.

== Services ==
The community has one store, a health centre and a two-person Royal Canadian Mounted Police detachment.

== Education ==
The community has a K-9 school, Chief Julian Yendo School with an enrolment of 24 as of 2018. After completion of grade 9 students go to the Thomas Simpson Secondary School in Fort Simpson.

== Climate ==
Wrigley has a continental subarctic climate (Dfc). The area combines mild to warm short summers with long and very cold winters. The differences between the coldest and warmest month are rather extreme even by continental standards, with the January high being −21 °C (−6 °F) and the July high being 23 °C (73 °F) according to Environment and Climate Change Canada. Transitional seasons are rather short.

Climate data for Wrigley (Wrigley Airport) Climate ID: 2204000; coordinates 63°12′34″N 123°26′12″W; elevation: 149.7 m (491 ft); 1981-2010 normals (Note: Composite data from Wrigley Airport: Climate ID: 2204005; coordinates 63°12′35″N 123°26′12″W; elevation: 149.7 m (491 ft), temperature extremes, humidex, and wind chill taken from 1991-2020 normals)
Month	Jan	Feb	Mar	Apr	May	Jun	Jul	Aug	Sep	Oct	Nov	Dec	Year
Record high humidex	11.2	10.0	18.8	24.0	30.4	38.1	37.9	36.9	29.8	21.3	7.2	11.0	38.1
Record high °C (°F)	6.5 (43.7)	11.1 (52.0)	19.0 (66.2)	25.0 (77.0)	34.0 (93.2)	37.0 (98.6)	35.8 (96.4)	33.5 (92.3)	28.3 (82.9)	21.7 (71.1)	8.9 (48.0)	11.7 (53.1)	37.0 (98.6)
Mean daily maximum °C (°F)	−21.1 (−6.0)	−17.1 (1.2)	−7.9 (17.8)	5.0 (41.0)	14.6 (58.3)	21.7 (71.1)	23.4 (74.1)	19.9 (67.8)	12.5 (54.5)	−0.3 (31.5)	−14.8 (5.4)	−18.6 (−1.5)	1.5 (34.7)
Daily mean °C (°F)	−25.4 (−13.7)	−22.1 (−7.8)	−15.0 (5.0)	−1.7 (28.9)	8.0 (46.4)	15.0 (59.0)	16.9 (62.4)	13.6 (56.5)	7.1 (44.8)	−3.8 (25.2)	−18.7 (−1.7)	−22.7 (−8.9)	−4.1 (24.6)
Mean daily minimum °C (°F)	−29.7 (−21.5)	−27.2 (−17.0)	−22.1 (−7.8)	−8.3 (17.1)	1.3 (34.3)	8.2 (46.8)	10.3 (50.5)	7.2 (45.0)	1.6 (34.9)	−7.4 (18.7)	−22.5 (−8.5)	−26.7 (−16.1)	−9.6 (14.7)
Record low °C (°F)	−51.7 (−61.1)	−53.3 (−63.9)	−46.7 (−52.1)	−36.1 (−33.0)	−20.9 (−5.6)	−3.9 (25.0)	−1.1 (30.0)	−6.0 (21.2)	−18.0 (−0.4)	−31.5 (−24.7)	−48.0 (−54.4)	−49.4 (−56.9)	−53.3 (−63.9)
Record low wind chill	−54.6	−52.7	−48.3	−39.4	−25.5	−1.9	−1.6	−3.2	−13.3	−28.5	−49.1	−57.7	−57.7
Average precipitation mm (inches)	16.7 (0.66)	14.6 (0.57)	10.4 (0.41)	8.1 (0.32)	22.0 (0.87)	43.5 (1.71)	64.0 (2.52)	49.5 (1.95)	35.9 (1.41)	29.4 (1.16)	20.5 (0.81)	18.1 (0.71)	332.6 (13.09)
Average rainfall mm (inches)	0.0 (0.0)	0.0 (0.0)	0.0 (0.0)	0.3 (0.01)	18.4 (0.72)	43.5 (1.71)	64.0 (2.52)	49.5 (1.95)	32.3 (1.27)	7.6 (0.30)	0.0 (0.0)	0.0 (0.0)	215.5 (8.48)
Average snowfall cm (inches)	19.1 (7.5)	15.4 (6.1)	10.9 (4.3)	8.9 (3.5)	3.8 (1.5)	0.0 (0.0)	0.0 (0.0)	0.0 (0.0)	3.4 (1.3)	21.8 (8.6)	22.6 (8.9)	18.9 (7.4)	124.7 (49.1)
Average precipitation days (≥ 0.2 mm)	8.0	6.4	5.6	3.3	6.4	8.4	9.7	9.0	9.2	9.7	9.0	7.5	92.1
Average rainy days (≥ 0.2 mm)	0.0	0.0	0.0	0.4	5.6	8.2	9.7	9.0	8.3	2.2	0.1	0.0	43.3
Average snowy days (≥ 0.2 cm)	8.0	6.4	5.6	2.9	1.1	0.0	0.0	0.0	1.1	7.9	9.1	7.5	49.4
Source: Environment and Climate Change Canada (1981-2010 normals) (temperature extremes, humidex, and wind chill 1991-2020) (July maximum)
