= Jean Marie River =

Jean Marie River Tthets’ek’ehdeli
- First Nation - Designated Authority (Tthets'éhk'edélî First Nation)
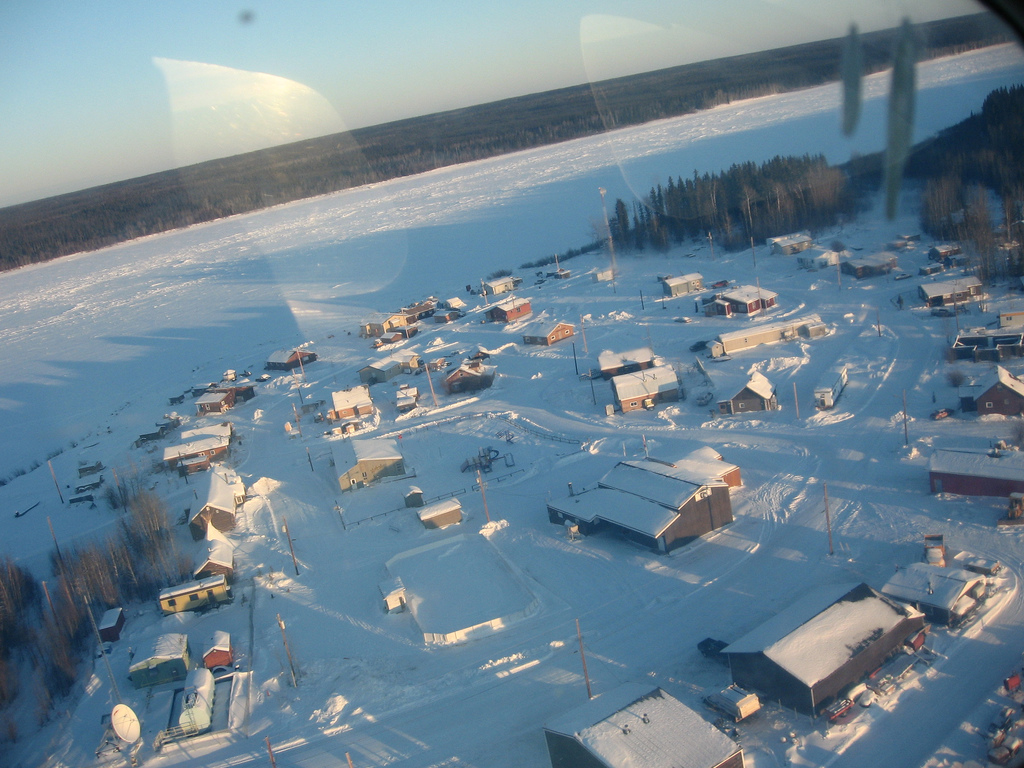
- Jean Marie River

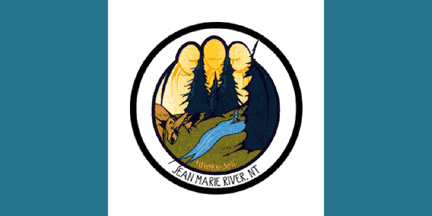
- Flag

- Location within Northwest Territories Location within Canada
- Coordinates: 61°31′30″N 120°37′40″W
- Country: Canada
- Territory: Northwest Territories
- Region: Dehcho Region
- Electoral district: Nahendeh
- Census division: Region 4

Government
  - Chief: Melanie Norwegian-Menacho
  - Senior Administrative Officer: Tammy Neal
  - MLA: Shane Thompson

Area
  - Land: 37.5 km^{2} (14.5 sq mi)
- Elevation: 143 m (469 ft)

Population (2021)
  - Total: 63
  - Density: 1.7/km^{2} (4.4/sq mi)
- Time zone: UTC−07:00 (MST)
  - Summer (DST): UTC−06:00 (MDT)
- Postal code: X0E 0N0^{A}
- Area code: 867
- Telephone exchange: 809
- Living cost: 142.5^{B}
- Website: www.jmrfn.com
- Sources: Department of Municipal and Community Affairs, Prince of Wales Northern Heritage Centre, Canada Flight Supplement^APostal code shared with Fort Simpson^B2013 figure based on Edmonton = 100

Jean Marie River (Slavey language: Tthets’ek’ehdeli "water flowing over clay") is a "Designated Authority" in the Dehcho Region of the Northwest Territories, Canada. The community is located on the Jean Marie River where it joins the Mackenzie River. The community has a small airport, Jean Marie River Airport, and is accessible by charter aircraft throughout the year and by the all-season JMR Access Road 27 km (17 mi) from the Mackenzie Highway.

== History ==
The Tthek’éhdél Dene of what is today Jean Marie River First Nation were primarily nomadic people who hunted moose and caribou, trapped for beaver and fished the rivers and lakes of the Great Slave Plain.

In the early 1920s, the transition from a nomadic lifestyle to sedentism began under the orders of the Elder Norwegian (a chief of the area). This led to the formation of various permanent posts in the overall area.

By the 1950s, the settlement of Jean Marie River had begun to develop a non-traditional economy based around river transportation and logging, which had a collectivist style of living, however in the recent decades the area had various initiative to fully move towards a more intricate economic system, distancing itself from its traditional one.

Starting from the 2010s, the area started to suffer the consequences of climate change and the local way of life, including food security.

== Demographics ==
Federal census population history of Jean Marie River
Year	Pop.	±%
1976	62	—
1981	69	+11.3%
1986	64	−7.2%
1991	49	−23.4%
1996	53	+8.2%
2001	50	−5.7%
2006	81	+62.0%
2011	64	−21.0%
2016	77	+20.3%
2021	63	−18.2%
Source: Statistics Canada

Annual population estimates

Year	Pop.	±%
1996	53	—
1997	53	+0.0%
1998	60	+13.2%
1999	69	+15.0%
2000	75	+8.7%
2001	74	−1.3%
2002	74	+0.0%
2003	73	−1.4%
2004	71	−2.7%
2005	79	+11.3%
2006	82	+3.8%

Year	Pop.	±%
2007	77	−6.1%
2008	72	−6.5%
2009	73	+1.4%
2010	68	−6.8%
2011	62	−8.8%
2012	62	+0.0%
2013	66	+6.5%
2014	72	+9.1%
2015	78	+8.3%
2016	88	+12.8%
2017	94	+6.8%

Sources: NWT Bureau of Statistics (2001 - 2017)

In the 2021 Canadian census conducted by Statistics Canada, Jean Marie River had a population of 63 living in 33 of its 37 total private dwellings, a change of −18.2% from its 2016 population of 77. With a land area of 37.5 km^{2} (14.5 sq mi), it had a population density of 1.7/km^{2} (4.4/sq mi) in 2021.

In 2021, the entirety of its population was First Nations. The only languages in the community were Indigenous languages and English. The main Indigenous languages in the community are a group of Athabaskan languages called Dene Yatıé or Zhatıé / K’ashógot’įne Goxedǝ́ (South Slavey / Hare).

== Services ==
Royal Canadian Mounted Police services are provided through Fort Simpson. There is no hospital but there is a health station, the "Jean Marie Health Cabin", located in the community. There is currently no grocery store, but there are accommodations and a visitors centre. There is GNWT Petroleum Products Division fuel station that offers both diesel and gasoline, and accepts both debit or cash, operated by a local contractor. Education from kindergarten to grade 9 is provided through the Louie Norwegian School and they are part of the Dehcho Divisional Education Council.

== First Nations ==
The Dene of the community are represented by the Jean Marie River First Nation (Tthets'éhk'edélî First Nation) and are a member of the Dehcho First Nations.

== Mackenzie River Flooding ==
On 7 May 2021, the Mackenzie River flooded, damaging 22 of the community's 26 homes and its only school, disabling the only power plant servicing the community, and causing significant diesel spills. Rebuilding had begun by the 9 June; residents raised objections to the slowness of the authorities' approach, and a lack of guidance in relation to oil spills which had left many homes smelling strongly of diesel.

== Gallery ==
Around Jean Marie River
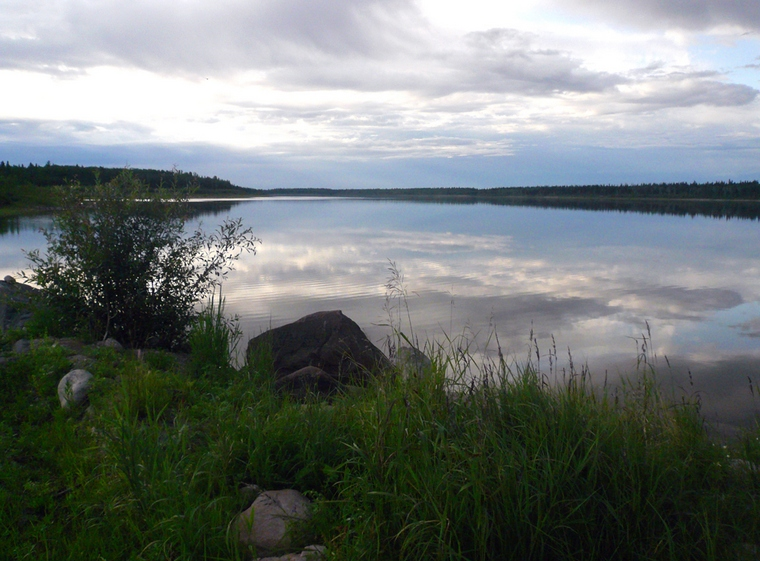
Jean Marie River, Mackenzie River

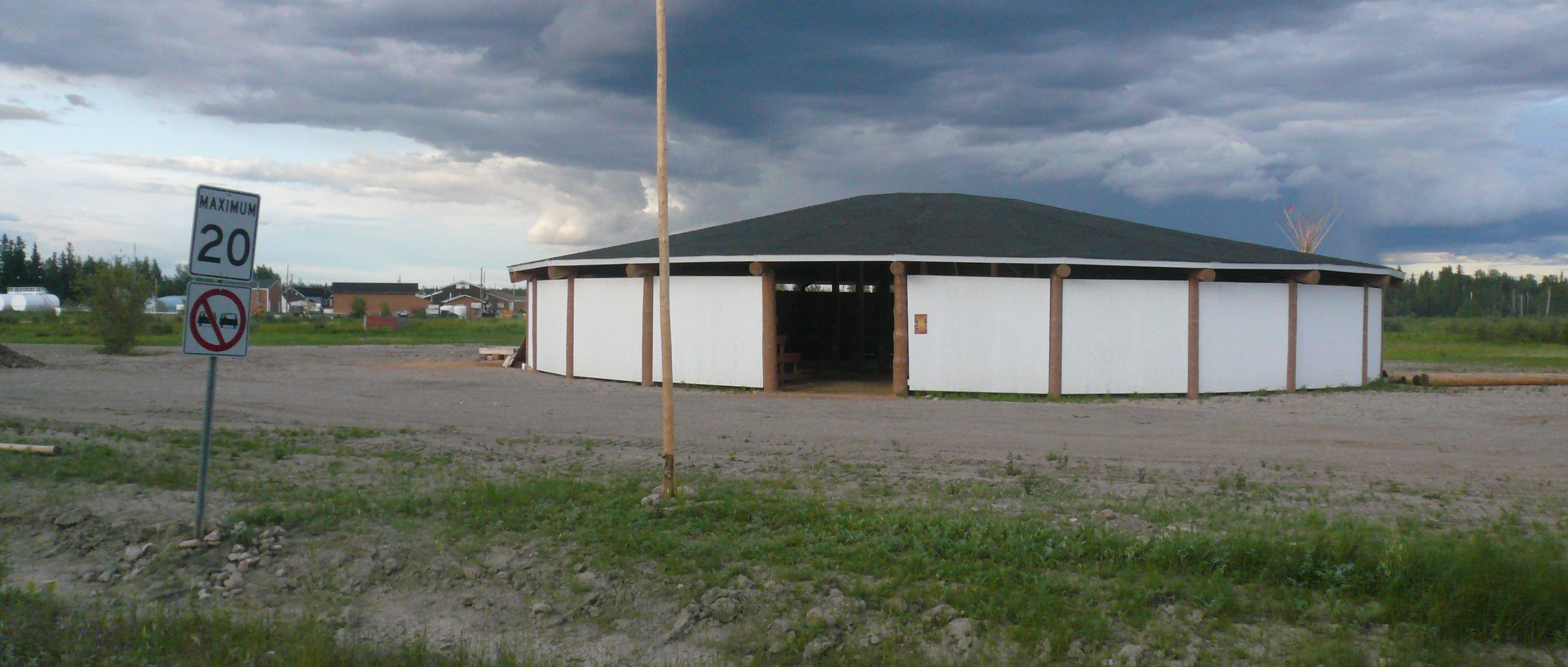
Jean Marie River, ceremonial house

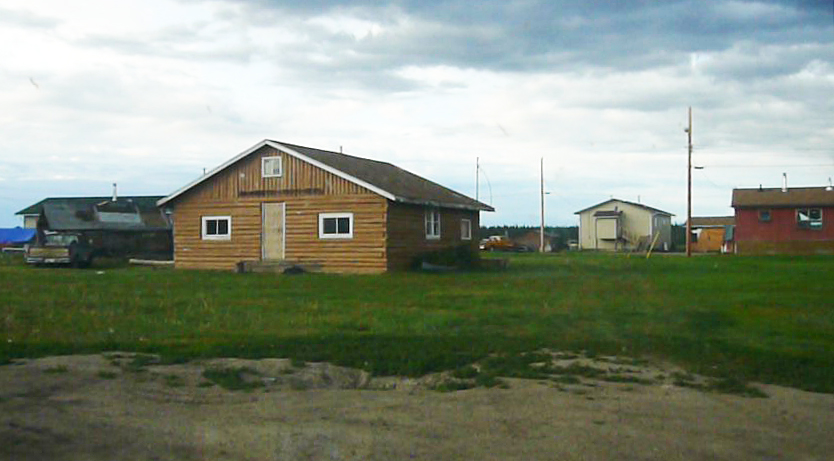
Houses in Jean Marie River

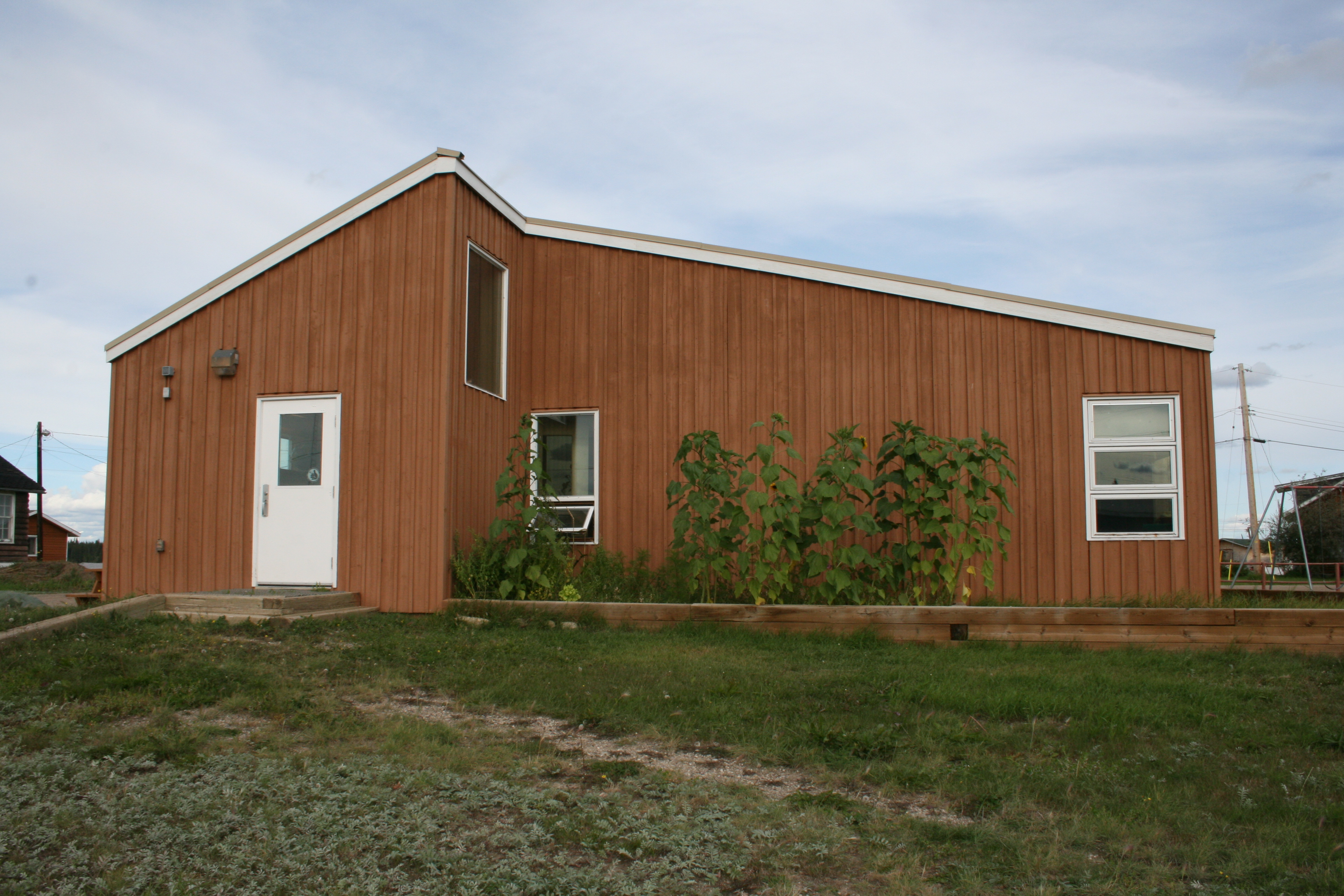
Louie Norwegian School
