= Fort Liard =

Fort Liard Echaot'l Koe or Acho Dene Kue
- Hamlet
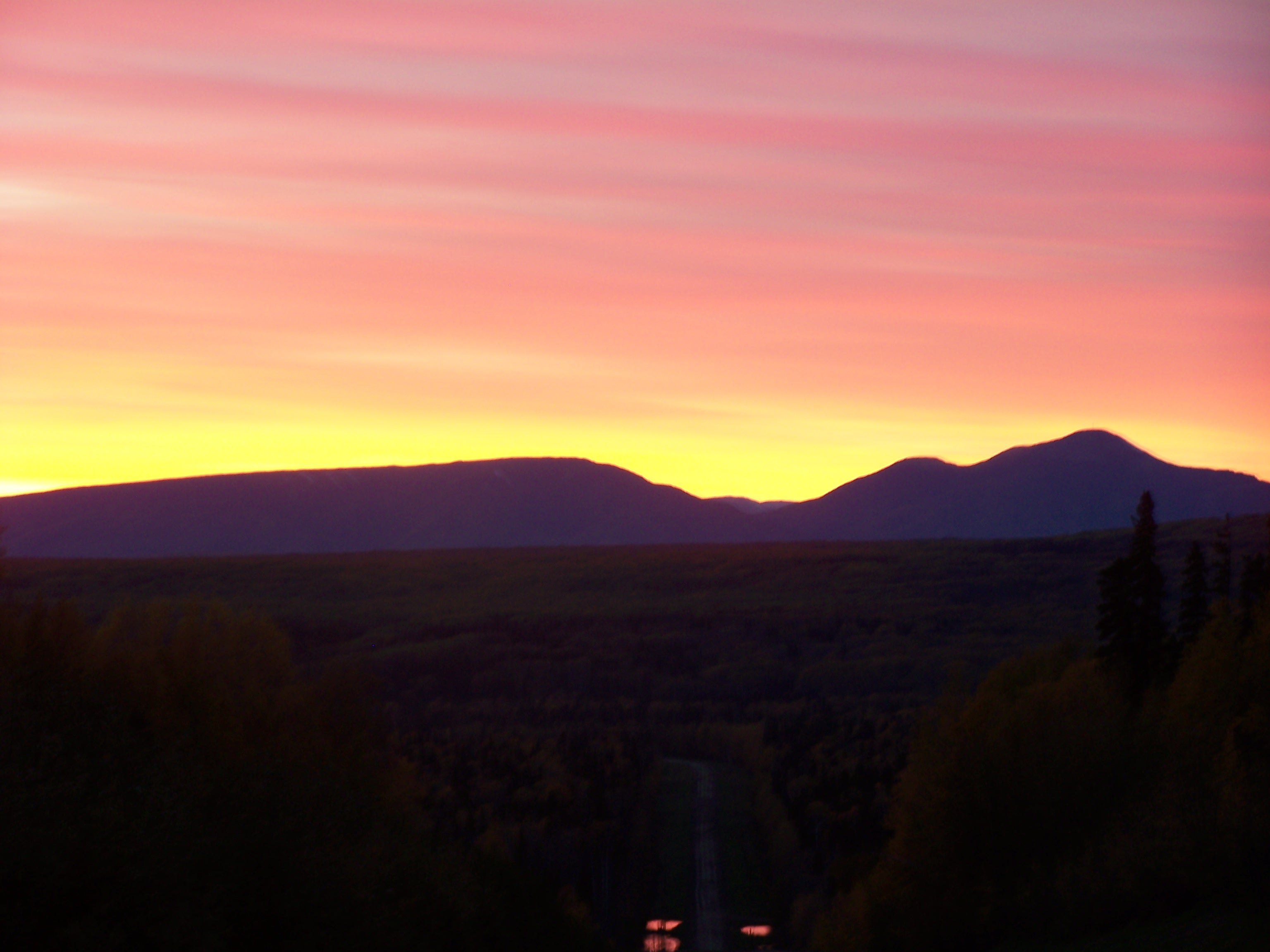
- The Sleeping Giant – the view from the top of the hill heading into the Hamlet

- Location within Northwest Territories Location within Canada
- Coordinates: 60°14′21″N 123°28′31″W
- Country: Canada
- Territory: Northwest Territories
- Region: Dehcho Region
- Constituency: Nahendeh
- Census division: Region 4
- Incorporated (hamlet): 1 April 1987

Government
  - Mayor: Genevieve McLeod
  - Senior Administrative Officer: John McKee
  - MLA: Shane Thompson

Area
  - Land: 67.61 km^{2} (26.10 sq mi)
- Elevation: 216 m (709 ft)

Population (2021)
  - Total: 468
  - Density: 6.9/km^{2} (18/sq mi)
- Time zone: UTC−06:00 (Northwest Territories Time)
- Canadian Postal code: X0G 0A0
- Area code: 867
- Telephone exchange: 770
  - Living cost (2018): 132.5^{A}
  - Food price index (2019): 145.4^{B}
- Website: www.fortliard.com
- Sources: Department of Municipal and Community Affairs, Prince of Wales Northern Heritage Centre, Canada Flight Supplement^A2018 figure based on Edmonton = 100^B2019 figure based on Yellowknife = 100

Fort Liard /liˈɑːrd/ (Slavey language: Echaot'l Koe "people from the land of the giants" or Acho Dene Kue) is a hamlet in the Dehcho Region of the Northwest Territories, Canada. It is located 37 km (23 mi) north of the British Columbia border. It became accessible by road in 1984 with the completion of the Liard Highway (Northwest Territories Highway 7 and British Columbia Highway 77).

The Hamlet of Fort Liard is served by two general merchandise stores: The General Store and The North West Company store. The K-12 community school, "Echo Dene School", has a student population of about 150. It also has a community health centre with four nurses, a Royal Canadian Mounted Police detachment with four members, and a recreation centre, including a swimming pool, skating rink, youth centre and multi-court. There is a fuel centre that sells gasoline, diesel fuel, propane, emergency survival kits and convenience items. There is also a traditional craft store which sells locally made craft items.

== Demographics ==
In the 2021 Census of Population conducted by Statistics Canada, Fort Liard had a population of 468 living in 170 of its 209 total private dwellings, a change of −6.4% from its 2016 population of 500. With a land area of 67.61 km^{2} (26.10 sq mi), it had a population density of 6.9/km^{2} (17.9/sq mi) in 2021.

In the 2016 Census the majority of the population, 445 people out of a total of 500, were Indigenous, either First Nations or Métis.

Federal census population history of Fort Liard
Year	Pop.	±%
1976	299	—
1981	405	+35.5%
1986	395	−2.5%
1991	485	+22.8%
1996	512	+5.6%
2001	530	+3.5%
2006	583	+10.0%
2011	536	−8.1%
2016	500	−6.7%
2021	468	−6.4%
Source: Statistics Canada

Annual population estimates

Year	Pop.	±%
1996	538	—
1997	528	−1.9%
1998	525	−0.6%
1999	537	+2.3%
2000	571	+6.3%
2001	582	+1.9%
2002	599	+2.9%
2003	575	−4.0%
2004	601	+4.5%
2005	596	−0.8%
2006	606	+1.7%
2007	586	−3.3%

Year	Pop.	±%
2008	569	−2.9%
2009	564	−0.9%
2010	564	+0.0%
2011	554	−1.8%
2012	566	+2.2%
2013	571	+0.9%
2014	587	+2.8%
2015	623	+6.1%
2016	629	+1.0%
2017	658	+4.6%
2018	548	−16.7%
2019	542	−1.1%

Sources: NWT Bureau of Statistics (2008–2019), NWT Bureau of Statistics (2001 – 2017)

== First Nations ==
The Dene of the community are represented by the Acho Dene Koe Band and the Métis by Fort Liard Metis Local 67. Both groups belong to the Deh Cho First Nations Tribal Council.

== Gallery ==
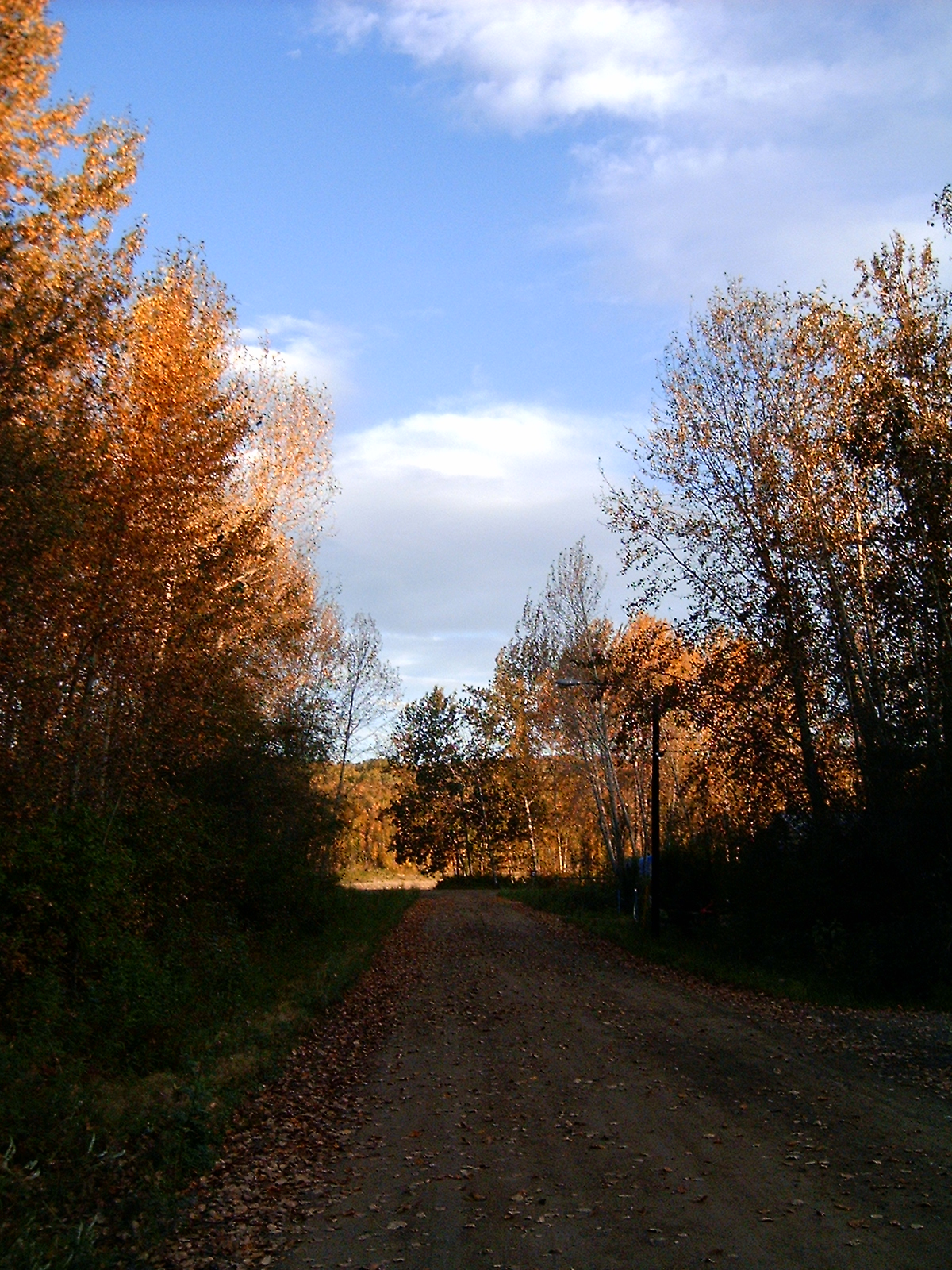
Beautiful Autumn Colors

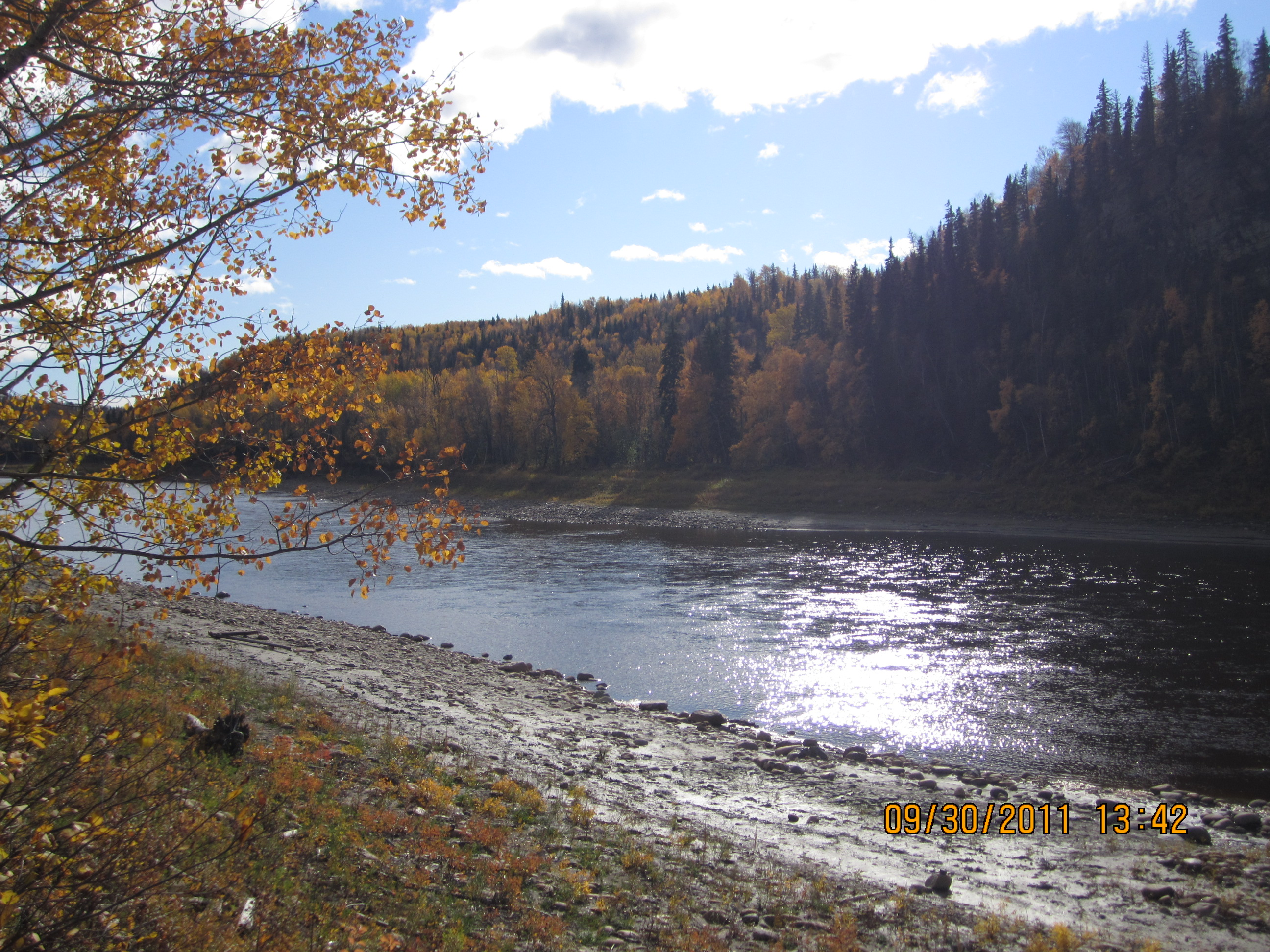
Petitot River just before it meets the Liard River

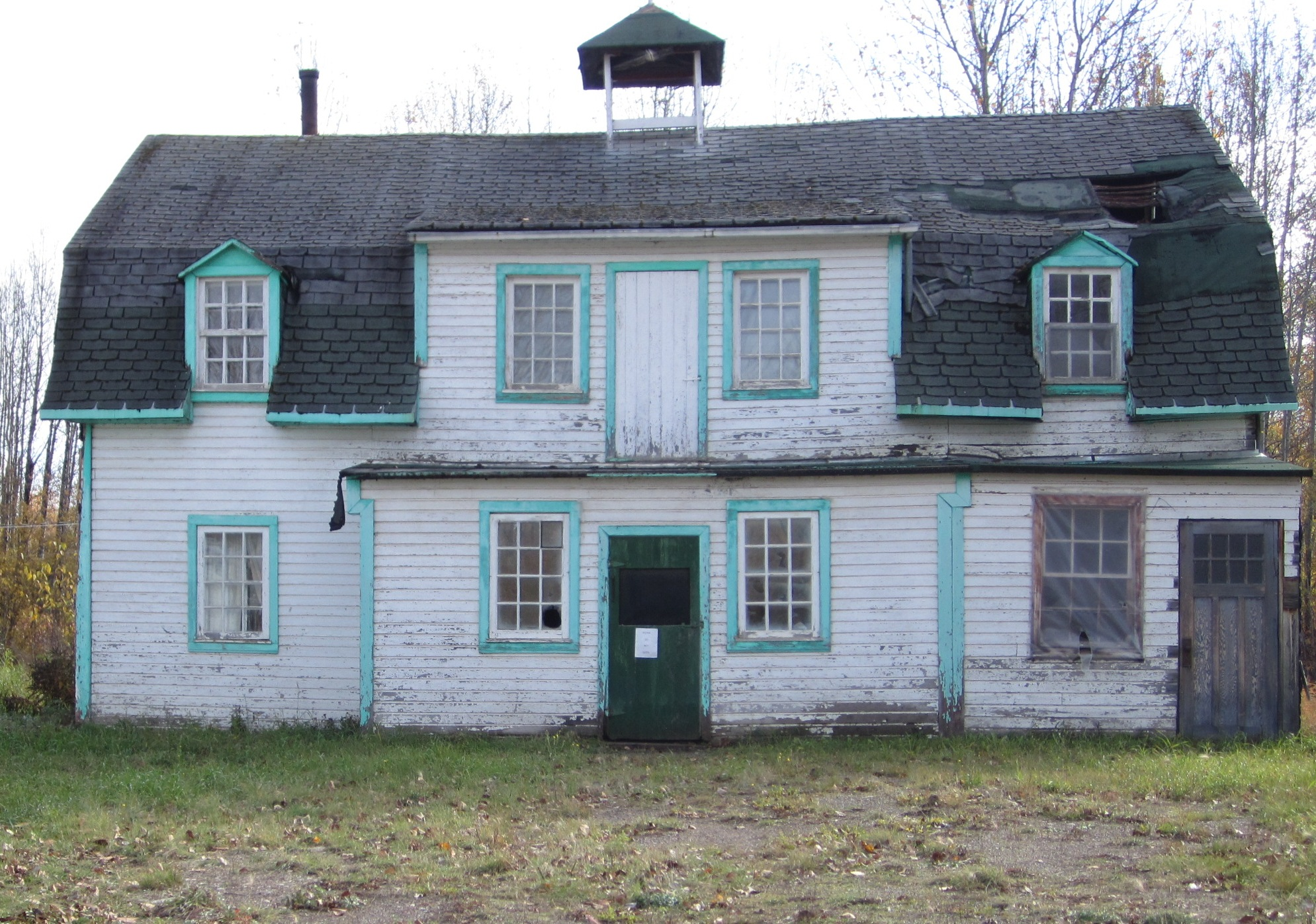
Roman Catholic Church

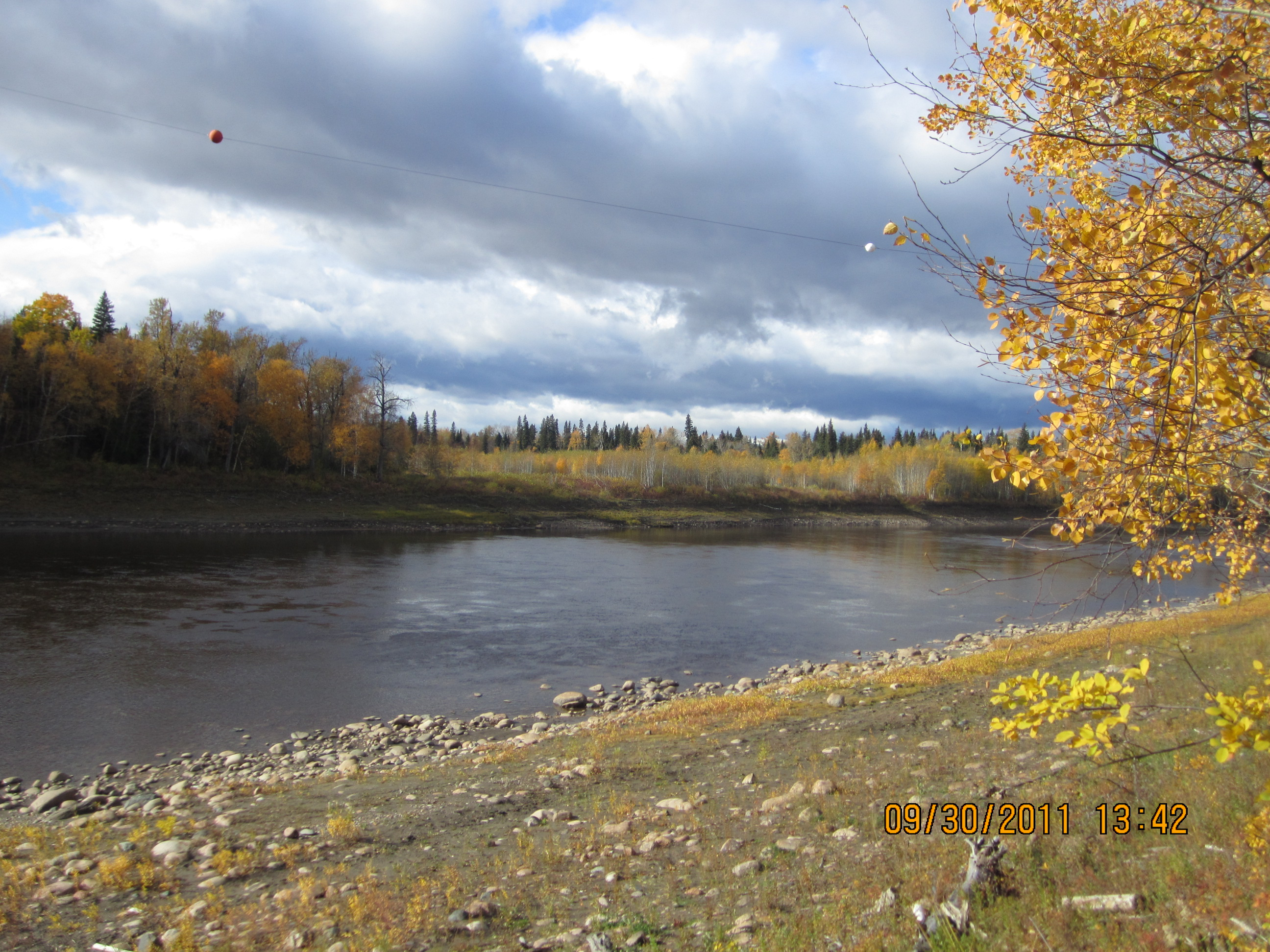
Petiot River looking toward the Liard River

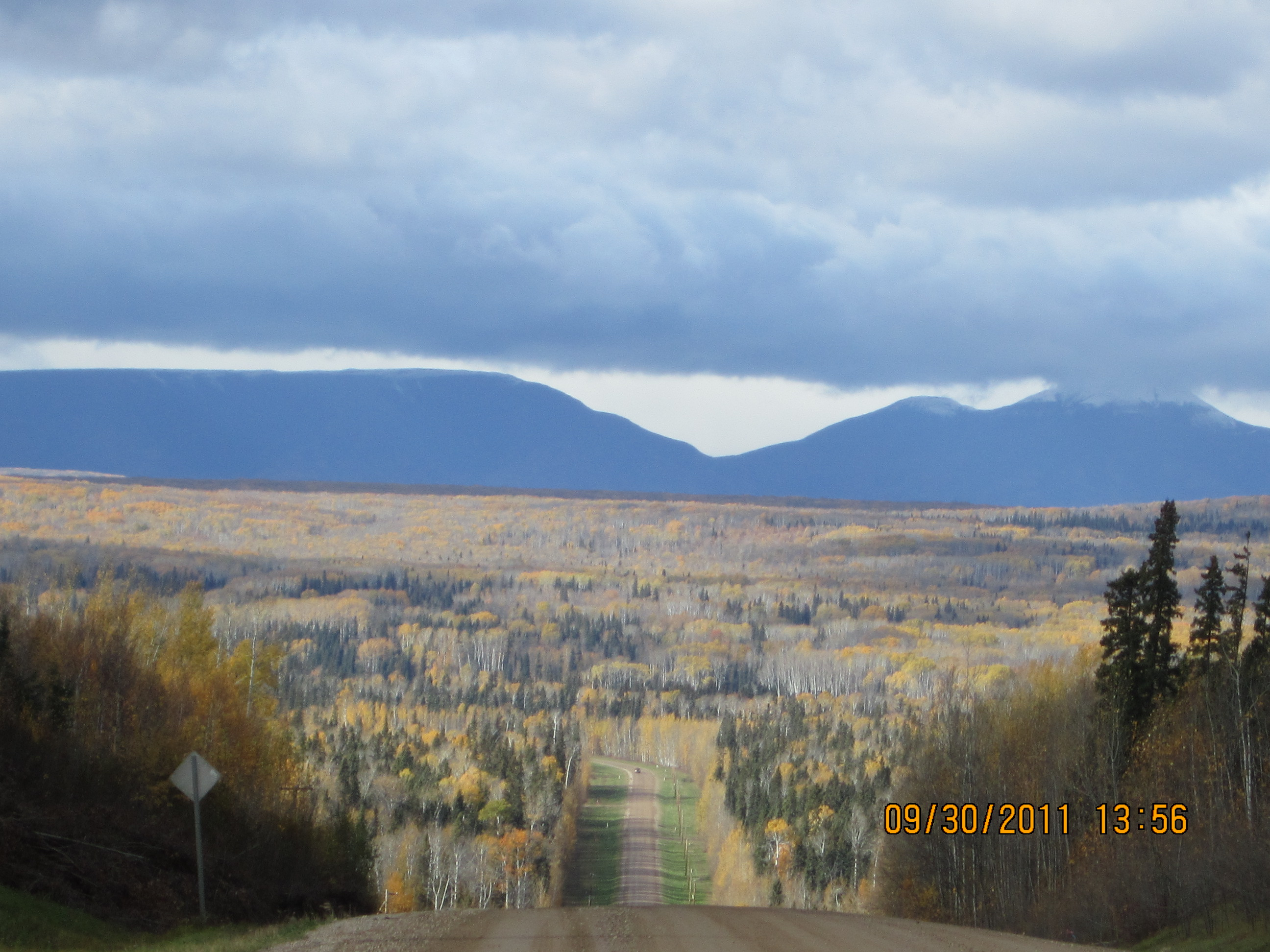
The Sleeping Giant in Fall

== Climate ==
Fort Liard has a borderline humid continental climate (Köppen climate classification Dfb), just above a subarctic climate (Köppen climate classification Dfc), characterized by extreme variation of temperatures between seasons. Temperatures can be warm in the summer, and cold in the winter. Fort Liard has an average frost free period of around 120 days, one of the longest in the territory.

The highest temperature ever recorded in Fort Liard was 35.2 °C (95.4 °F) on 13 July 2014 and 27 June 2021. The coldest temperature ever recorded was −46.7 °C (−52.1 °F) on 15 January 1974.

Climate data for Fort Liard (Fort Liard Airport) Climate ID: 2201575; coordinates 60°14′06″N 123°28′01″W; elevation: 215.8 m (708 ft); 1991-2020 normals, extremes 1973–present (Note: Composite data from Fort Liard A: Climate ID: 2201581; coordinates 60°14′08″N 123°28′12″W; elevation: 215.8 m (708 ft) and Fort Liard; WMO ID: 71497; coordinates 60°14′N 123°28′W; elevation: 213.4 m (700 ft))
Month	Jan	Feb	Mar	Apr	May	Jun	Jul	Aug	Sep	Oct	Nov	Dec	Year
Record high humidex	14.7	14.1	19.8	22.9	31.7	35.5	42.6	38.7	32.1	26.6	13.3	14.3	42.6
Record high °C (°F)	14.8 (58.6)	15.0 (59.0)	19.9 (67.8)	25.0 (77.0)	32.6 (90.7)	35.2 (95.4)	35.2 (95.4)	34.9 (94.8)	30.5 (86.9)	26.5 (79.7)	13.5 (56.3)	15.3 (59.5)	35.2 (95.4)
Mean daily maximum °C (°F)	−16.7 (1.9)	−10.1 (13.8)	−2.4 (27.7)	8.8 (47.8)	17.4 (63.3)	22.0 (71.6)	23.7 (74.7)	21.6 (70.9)	15.3 (59.5)	4.8 (40.6)	−8.8 (16.2)	−15.4 (4.3)	5.0 (41.0)
Daily mean °C (°F)	−20.8 (−5.4)	−15.7 (3.7)	−9.4 (15.1)	2.0 (35.6)	10.3 (50.5)	15.4 (59.7)	17.6 (63.7)	15.5 (59.9)	9.6 (49.3)	0.7 (33.3)	−12.5 (9.5)	−19.3 (−2.7)	−0.6 (30.9)
Mean daily minimum °C (°F)	−24.9 (−12.8)	−21.3 (−6.3)	−16.3 (2.7)	−4.7 (23.5)	3.2 (37.8)	8.8 (47.8)	11.4 (52.5)	9.4 (48.9)	3.9 (39.0)	−3.4 (25.9)	−16.3 (2.7)	−23.1 (−9.6)	−6.1 (21.0)
Record low °C (°F)	−46.7 (−52.1)	−44.0 (−47.2)	−38.3 (−36.9)	−30.5 (−22.9)	−14.5 (5.9)	−1.6 (29.1)	−0.1 (31.8)	−1.7 (28.9)	−11.7 (10.9)	−30.0 (−22.0)	−43.0 (−45.4)	−45.0 (−49.0)	−46.7 (−52.1)
Record low wind chill	−61.6	−51.9	−46.6	−34.3	−22.3	−3.9	0.0	0.0	−10.7	−32.4	−50.9	−53.2	−61.6
Average precipitation mm (inches)	27.0 (1.06)	19.3 (0.76)	15.2 (0.60)	15.9 (0.63)	39.5 (1.56)	71.3 (2.81)	82.2 (3.24)	54.0 (2.13)	43.4 (1.71)	27.4 (1.08)	31.0 (1.22)	22.9 (0.90)	449.2 (17.69)
Average rainfall mm (inches)	0.0 (0.0)	0.0 (0.0)	0.1 (0.00)	3.3 (0.13)	37.2 (1.46)	61.1 (2.41)	88.0 (3.46)	50.5 (1.99)	45.4 (1.79)	10.8 (0.43)	0.1 (0.00)	0.0 (0.0)	296.4 (11.67)
Average snowfall cm (inches)	30.5 (12.0)	22.8 (9.0)	17.0 (6.7)	12.2 (4.8)	1.9 (0.7)	0.0 (0.0)	0.0 (0.0)	0.0 (0.0)	2.0 (0.8)	16.8 (6.6)	35.4 (13.9)	26.7 (10.5)	165.3 (65.1)
Average precipitation days (≥ 0.2 mm)	9.2	7.7	7.0	4.9	9.8	10.7	12.3	12.2	10.9	8.6	10.1	8.1	111.3
Average rainy days (≥ 0.2 mm)	0.0	0.0	0.1	1.8	8.9	9.7	11.5	10.8	10.8	3.9	0.1	0.0	57.4
Average snowy days (≥ 0.2 cm)	9.0	7.4	7.5	3.2	1.0	0.0	0.0	0.0	0.8	5.4	10.1	7.4	51.8
Average relative humidity (%) (at 1500 LST)	70.9	62.9	49.6	40.7	37.4	46.7	49.8	51.3	53.0	66.4	74.9	74.8	56.6
Source: Environment and Climate Change Canada (June maximum) (August maximum)

== See also ==
- List of municipalities in the Northwest Territories
- Fort Liard Airport
