= List of postal codes of Canada: X =

This is a list of postal codes in Canada where the first letter is X. Postal codes beginning with X are located within the Canadian territories of Nunavut and the Northwest Territories. Only the first three characters are listed, corresponding to the Forward Sortation Area (FSA).

Canada Post provides a free postal code look-up tool on its website, and its mobile applications. Many vendors also sell validation tools, which allow customers to properly match addresses and postal codes. Hard-copy directories can also be consulted in all post offices, and some libraries.

== Nunavut and the Northwest Territories ==
There are currently 6 FSAs in this list.

Rural	Urban
X0A; Qikiqtaaluk Region 0A0: Arctic Bay; 0B0: Qikiqtarjuaq; 0C0: Kinngait; 0E0: Clyde River; 0G0: Eureka; 0H0: Iqaluit; 0J0: Grise Fiord; 0K0: Sanirajak; 0L0: Igloolik; 0N0: Kimmirut; 0R0: Pangnirtung; 0S0: Pond Inlet; 0V0: Resolute; 0W0: Sanikiluaq; 1H0: Iqaluit; 2H0: Iqaluit; 3H0: Iqaluit	X1A; Yellowknife	X9A; Not assigned
X0A; Qikiqtaaluk Region 0A0: Arctic Bay; 0B0: Qikiqtarjuaq; 0C0: Kinngait; 0E0: Clyde River; 0G0: Eureka; 0H0: Iqaluit; 0J0: Grise Fiord; 0K0: Sanirajak; 0L0: Igloolik; 0N0: Kimmirut; 0R0: Pangnirtung; 0S0: Pond Inlet; 0V0: Resolute; 0W0: Sanikiluaq; 1H0: Iqaluit; 2H0: Iqaluit; 3H0: Iqaluit	X1B; Not assigned	X9B; Not assigned
X0A; Qikiqtaaluk Region 0A0: Arctic Bay; 0B0: Qikiqtarjuaq; 0C0: Kinngait; 0E0: Clyde River; 0G0: Eureka; 0H0: Iqaluit; 0J0: Grise Fiord; 0K0: Sanirajak; 0L0: Igloolik; 0N0: Kimmirut; 0R0: Pangnirtung; 0S0: Pond Inlet; 0V0: Resolute; 0W0: Sanikiluaq; 1H0: Iqaluit; 2H0: Iqaluit; 3H0: Iqaluit	X1C; Not assigned	X9C; Not assigned
X0A; Qikiqtaaluk Region 0A0: Arctic Bay; 0B0: Qikiqtarjuaq; 0C0: Kinngait; 0E0: Clyde River; 0G0: Eureka; 0H0: Iqaluit; 0J0: Grise Fiord; 0K0: Sanirajak; 0L0: Igloolik; 0N0: Kimmirut; 0R0: Pangnirtung; 0S0: Pond Inlet; 0V0: Resolute; 0W0: Sanikiluaq; 1H0: Iqaluit; 2H0: Iqaluit; 3H0: Iqaluit	X1E; Not assigned	X9E; Not assigned
X0A; Qikiqtaaluk Region 0A0: Arctic Bay; 0B0: Qikiqtarjuaq; 0C0: Kinngait; 0E0: Clyde River; 0G0: Eureka; 0H0: Iqaluit; 0J0: Grise Fiord; 0K0: Sanirajak; 0L0: Igloolik; 0N0: Kimmirut; 0R0: Pangnirtung; 0S0: Pond Inlet; 0V0: Resolute; 0W0: Sanikiluaq; 1H0: Iqaluit; 2H0: Iqaluit; 3H0: Iqaluit	X1G; Not assigned	X9G; Not assigned
X0B; Kitikmeot Region 0C0: Cambridge Bay; 0E0: Kugluktuk; 1B0: Taloyoak; 1J0: Gjoa Haven; 1K0: Kugaaruk; 2A0: Bay Chimo (Umingmaktok)	X1H; Not assigned	X9H; Not assigned
X0B; Kitikmeot Region 0C0: Cambridge Bay; 0E0: Kugluktuk; 1B0: Taloyoak; 1J0: Gjoa Haven; 1K0: Kugaaruk; 2A0: Bay Chimo (Umingmaktok)	X1J; Not assigned	X9J; Not assigned
X0B; Kitikmeot Region 0C0: Cambridge Bay; 0E0: Kugluktuk; 1B0: Taloyoak; 1J0: Gjoa Haven; 1K0: Kugaaruk; 2A0: Bay Chimo (Umingmaktok)	X1K; Not assigned	X9K; Not assigned
X0C; Kivalliq Region 0A0: Baker Lake; 0B0: Chesterfield Inlet; 0C0: Coral Harbour; 0E0: Arviat; 0G0: Rankin Inlet; 0H0: Naujaat; 0J0: Whale Cove	X1L; Not assigned	X9L; Not assigned
X0C; Kivalliq Region 0A0: Baker Lake; 0B0: Chesterfield Inlet; 0C0: Coral Harbour; 0E0: Arviat; 0G0: Rankin Inlet; 0H0: Naujaat; 0J0: Whale Cove	X1M; Not assigned	X9M; Not assigned
X0C; Kivalliq Region 0A0: Baker Lake; 0B0: Chesterfield Inlet; 0C0: Coral Harbour; 0E0: Arviat; 0G0: Rankin Inlet; 0H0: Naujaat; 0J0: Whale Cove	X1N; Not assigned	X9N; Not assigned
X0E; Northwest Territories — almost all rural areas 0A0: Aklavik; 0B0: Tsiigehtchic; 0C1: Nahanni Butte; 0G0: Deline; 0H0: Fort Good Hope; 0J0: Fort McPherson; 0K0: Tulita; 0L0: Fort Providence; 0M0: Fort Resolution; 0N0: Fort Simpson; 0P0: Fort Smith; 0R0: Hay River; 0R1: Enterprise; 0S0: Ulukhaktok; 0T0: Inuvik; 0V0: Norman Wells; 0Y0: Behchoko; 0Z0: Sachs Harbour; 1A0: Lutselk'e; 1C0: Tuktoyaktuk; 1E0: Wrigley; 1G0: Enterprise; 1G1: Hay River; 1L0: Colville Lake; 1N0: Paulatuk; 1P0: Whatì; 1R0: Gamèti; 1W0: Wekweti; 1Z0: Trout Lake (Sambaa Kʼe); 2N0: Nahanni Butte	X1P; Not assigned	X9P; Not assigned
	X1R; Not assigned	X9R; Not assigned
	X1S; Not assigned	X9S; Not assigned
	X1T; Not assigned	X9T; Not assigned
	X1V; Not assigned	X9V; Not assigned
	X1W; Not assigned	X9W; Not assigned
	X1X; Not assigned	X9X; Not assigned
	X1Y; Not assigned	X9Y; Not assigned
X0G; Southwestern Northwest Territories; 0A0: Fort Liard	X1Z; Not assigned	X9Z; Reserved; United States-bound mail

== FSAs by population ==
1. X1A, 20,804
2. X0E, 19,798
3. X0A, 19,355
4. X0C, 11,027
5. X0B, 6,476
6. X0G, 468
