= Nahendeh =

Territorial electoral district in the Northwest Territories, Canada

Northwest Territories electoral district
- Boundaries of Nahendeh

Territorial electoral district
- Legislature: Legislative Assembly of the Northwest Territories
MLA
Shane Thompson
- First contested: 1987
- Last contested: 2023
- Region: Dehcho Region
- Communities: Fort Simpson, Fort Liard, Wrigley, Sambaa Kʼe, Nahanni Butte, Jean Marie River

Nahendeh is a territorial electoral district for the Legislative Assembly of the Northwest Territories, Canada. The district is roughly coterminous with the Dehcho Region, whose major communities are Fort Simpson and Fort Liard. The district also encompasses the smaller communities of Wrigley, Sambaa Kʼe, Nahanni Butte, and Jean Marie River.

== Members of the Legislative Assembly (MLAs) ==
Name	Elected	Left Office
Nick Sibbeston	1987	1991
Jim Antoine	1991	2003
Kevin Menicoche	2003	2015
Shane Thompson	2015	present

== Election results ==
=== 2023 election ===
2023 Northwest Territories general election
Candidate	Votes	%
Shane Thompson (I.C.)	326	34.50
Mavis Cli-Michaud	185	19.58
Sharon Allen	149	15.77
Hillary Deneron	149	15.77
Les Wright	115	12.17
Josh P.T. Campbell	21	2.22
Total votes	945	

=== 2019 election ===
2019 Northwest Territories general election
Candidate	Votes
Shane Thompson	536
Mike Drake	190
Randy Sibbeston	111
Eric Menicoche	40

=== 2015 election ===
2015 Northwest Territories general election
Candidate	Votes	%
Shane Thompson	292	29.4
Rosemary Gill	202	20.4
Randy Sibbetson	198	20.0
Kevin Menicoche	137	13.8
Deneze Nakehk'o	128	12.9
Arnold Hope	23	2.3
Dennis Nelner	12	1.2
Total valid ballots / Turnout	992	60%

=== 2011 election ===
2011 Northwest Territories general election
Candidate	Votes
Kevin Menicoche	431
Bertha Norwegian	127

=== 2007 election ===
2007 Northwest Territories general election
Candidate	Votes	%
Kevin Menicoche	548	61.30%
Arnold Hope	203	22.71%
Bob Hanna	71	7.94%
Keyna Norwegian	70	7.83%
Total valid ballots / Turnout	892	56.98%
Rejected ballots	2	
Source(s) "Official Voting Results 2007 General Election" (PDF). Elections NWT. Archived from the original (PDF) on 11 April 2008.

=== 2003 election ===
2003 Northwest Territories general election
Candidate	Votes	%
Kevin Menicoche	362	34.48%
Kathy Tsetso	224	21.33%
Arnold Hope	127	12.10%
Walter Blondin	122	11.62%
Shane A. Thompson	107	10.19%
Rita Cli	58	5.52%
John Hazenberg	33	3.14%
Yanny Leo Cordero	17	1.62%
Total valid ballots / Turnout	1,050	70.53%
Rejected ballots	8	
Source(s) "Official Voting Results 2003 General Election" (PDF). Elections NWT. Archived from the original (PDF) on 11 April 2008.

=== 1999 election ===
1999 Northwest Territories general election
Candidate	Votes	%
Jim Antoine	546	60.60%
Paul Matthew Gammon	312	34.63%
William Lafferty	43	4.77%
Total valid ballots / Turnout	901	72.24%
Rejected ballots	10	
Source(s) "Official Voting Results 1999 General Election" (PDF). Elections NWT. Archived from the original (PDF) on 11 April 2008.

=== 1995 election ===
1995 Northwest Territories general election
Candidate	Votes
Jim Antoine	Acclaimed

=== 1991 election ===
1991 Northwest Territories general election
Candidate	Votes	%
Jim Antoine	488	50.52%
Steve Malesku	160	16.56%
Pat Scott	117	12.11%
Arnold Hope	58	6.0%
Bill Lafferty	50	5.2%
Joe Germain Mercredi	41	4.2%
Bertha Norwegian	38	3.9%
Daniel Lapierre	14	1.5%
Total valid ballots / Turnout	975	77.1%
Rejected ballots	9	
Source(s) "Report of the Chief Electoral Officer on the Elections of Members to the Council of the Northwest Territories, 1991" (PDF). Elections Northwest Territories.

=== 1987 election ===
1987 Northwest Territories general election
Candidate	Votes	
Nick Sibbeston	651	79.6%
Jim Villeneuve	167	20.4%

== Notes ==
a: In the 2007 election, percentages assigned to candidates were based on the total votes cast. In prior elections the percentages were based on the valid votes.

== See also ==
- List of Northwest Territories territorial electoral districts
- Canadian provincial electoral districts
