= Dehcho Region =

- Administrative region
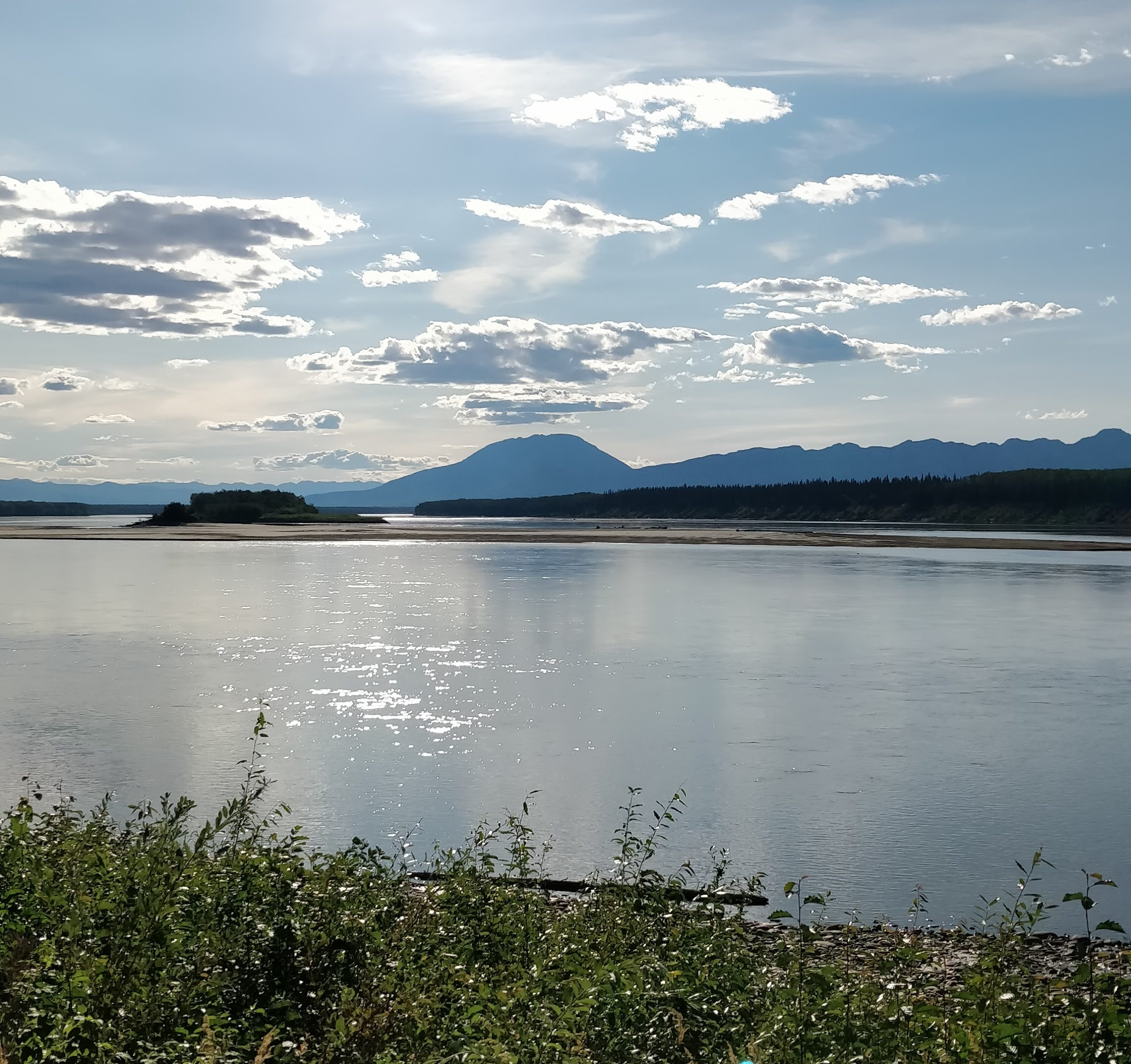
- Liard River, Blackstone Territorial Park

- Location within the Northwest Territories
- Country: Canada
- Territory: Northwest Territories
- Federal riding: Northwest Territories
- Territorial riding: Nahendeh
- Regional office: Fort Simpson

Area
  - Total: 194,494 km^{2} (75,095 sq mi)

Population (2021)
  - Total: 1,926
  - Rank: 5th NWT
  - Density: 0.009903/km^{2} (0.02565/sq mi)
  - % change (from 2016): −7.6
- Time zone: UTC−07:00 (MST)
  - Summer (DST): UTC−06:00 (DST)

Dehcho Region communities in the Northwest Territories

The Dehcho Region or Deh Cho is one of five administrative regions in the Northwest Territories of Canada. According to Municipal and Community Affairs the region consists of six communities with the regional office situated in Fort Simpson. All communities in the Dehcho are predominantly Dehcho First Nations.

== Communities ==
The Dehcho Region includes the following communities:

Communities of the Dehcho Region
Community				Demographics (2021)					
Name		Governance		Census		Indigenous population profile			
Official	Traditional	Type	Municipality	Total	Change (from 2016)	First Nations	Métis	Inuit	Other
Fort Liard	Echaot'ı̨e Kų́ę́	Hamlet	Yes	468	-6.4%	370	10	10 (Note: Inuvialuit)	90
Fort Simpson	Łı́ı́dlı̨ Kų́ę́	Village	Yes	1,100	-8.5%	670	85	30 (Note: Ten Inuvialuit)	390
Jean Marie River	Tthek'éhdélı̨	Designated authority	No	63	-18.2%	55	0	0	10
Nahanni Butte	Tthenáágó	Designated authority	No	81	-6.9%	80	0	0	0
Sambaa K'e		Designated authority	No	97	10.2%	85	0	0	10
Wrigley	Pedzéh Kı̨́	Designated authority	No	117	-1.7%	115	0	0	10

Historical population

Year	Pop.	±%
2001	2,293	—
2002	2,300	+0.3%
2003	2,258	−1.8%
2004	2,243	−0.7%
2005	2,251	+0.4%
2006	2,283	+1.4%
2007	2,230	−2.3%
2008	2,226	−0.2%
2009	2,253	+1.2%
2010	2,252	−0.0%

Year	Pop.	±%
2011	2,231	−0.9%
2012	2,231	+0.0%
2013	2,213	−0.8%
2014	2,237	+1.1%
2015	2,277	+1.8%
2016	2,269	−0.4%
2017	2,264	−0.2%
2001	2,293	+1.3%
2017	2,264	−1.3%

Sources: NWT Bureau of Statistics (2001 - 2017)

== Communities of the Dehcho Region ==
Communities of the Dehcho Region
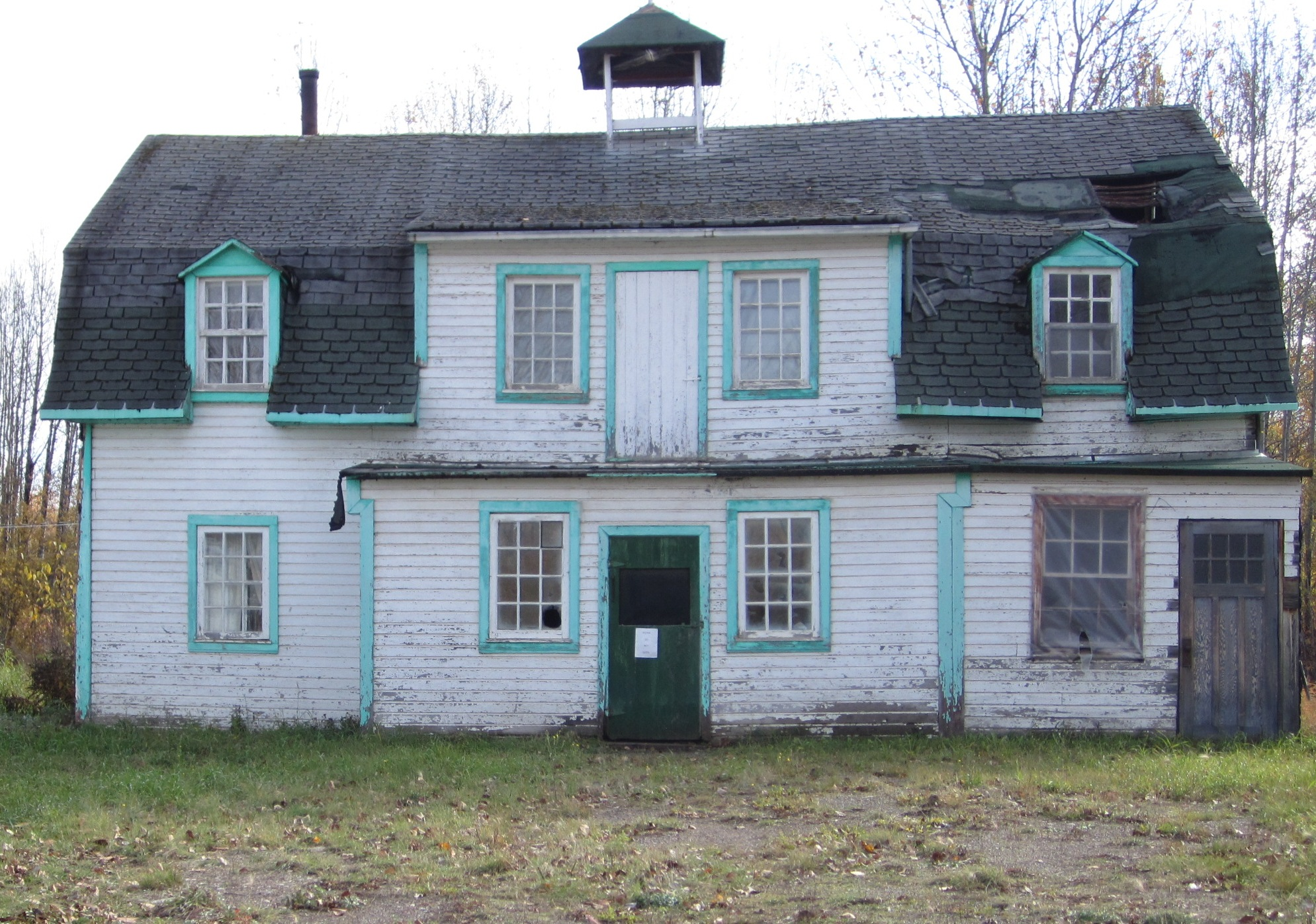
Former Roman Catholic church at Fort Liard (2011)

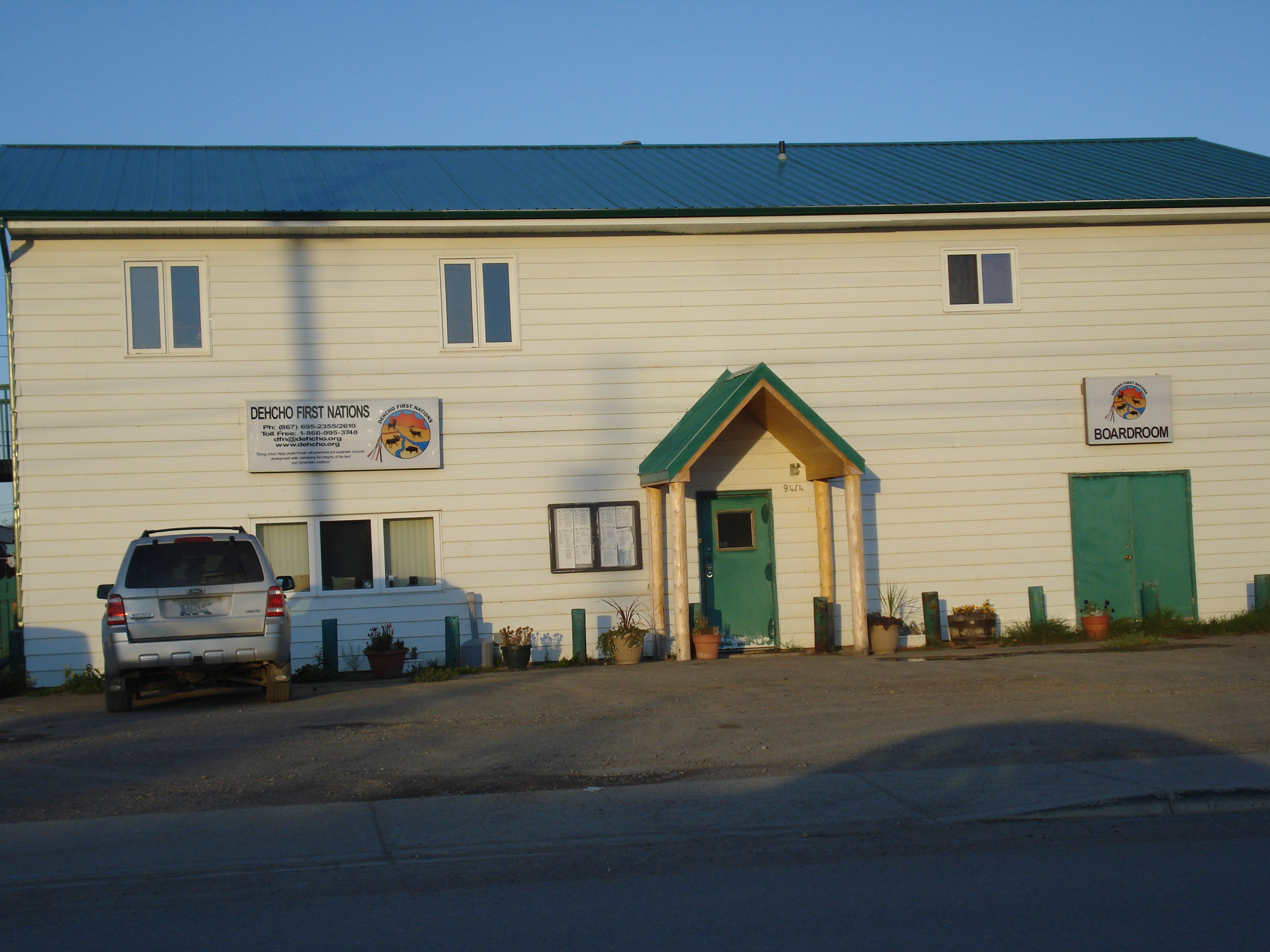
Dehcho First Nations office building at Fort Simpson (2011)

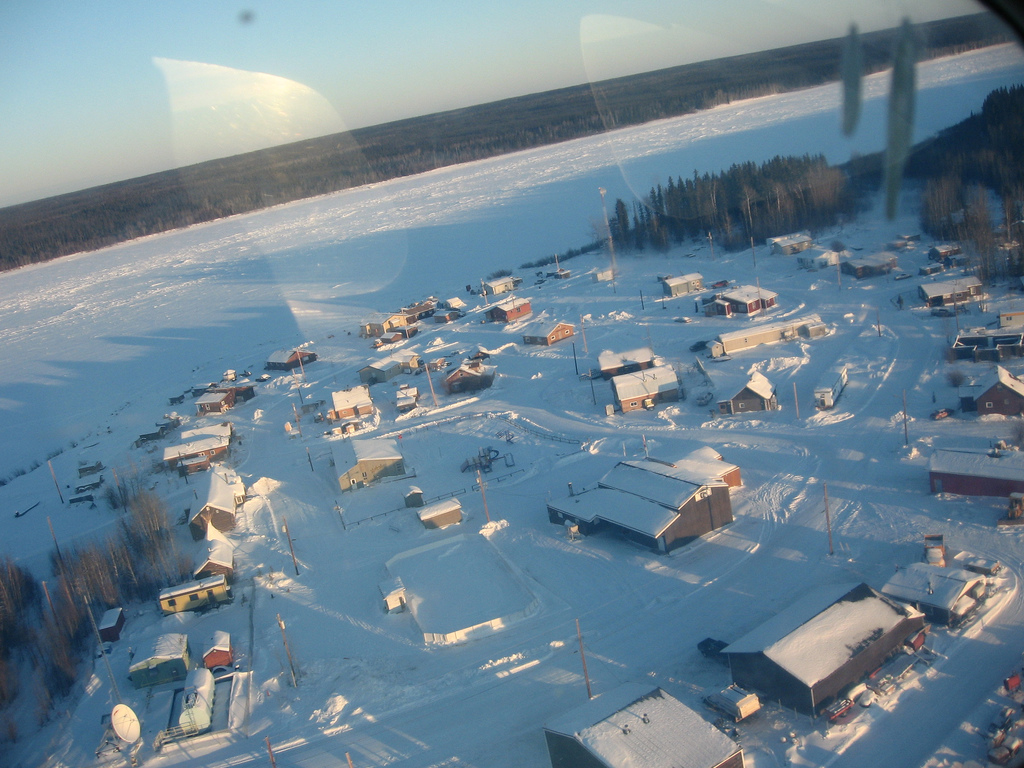
Jean Marie River (2007)

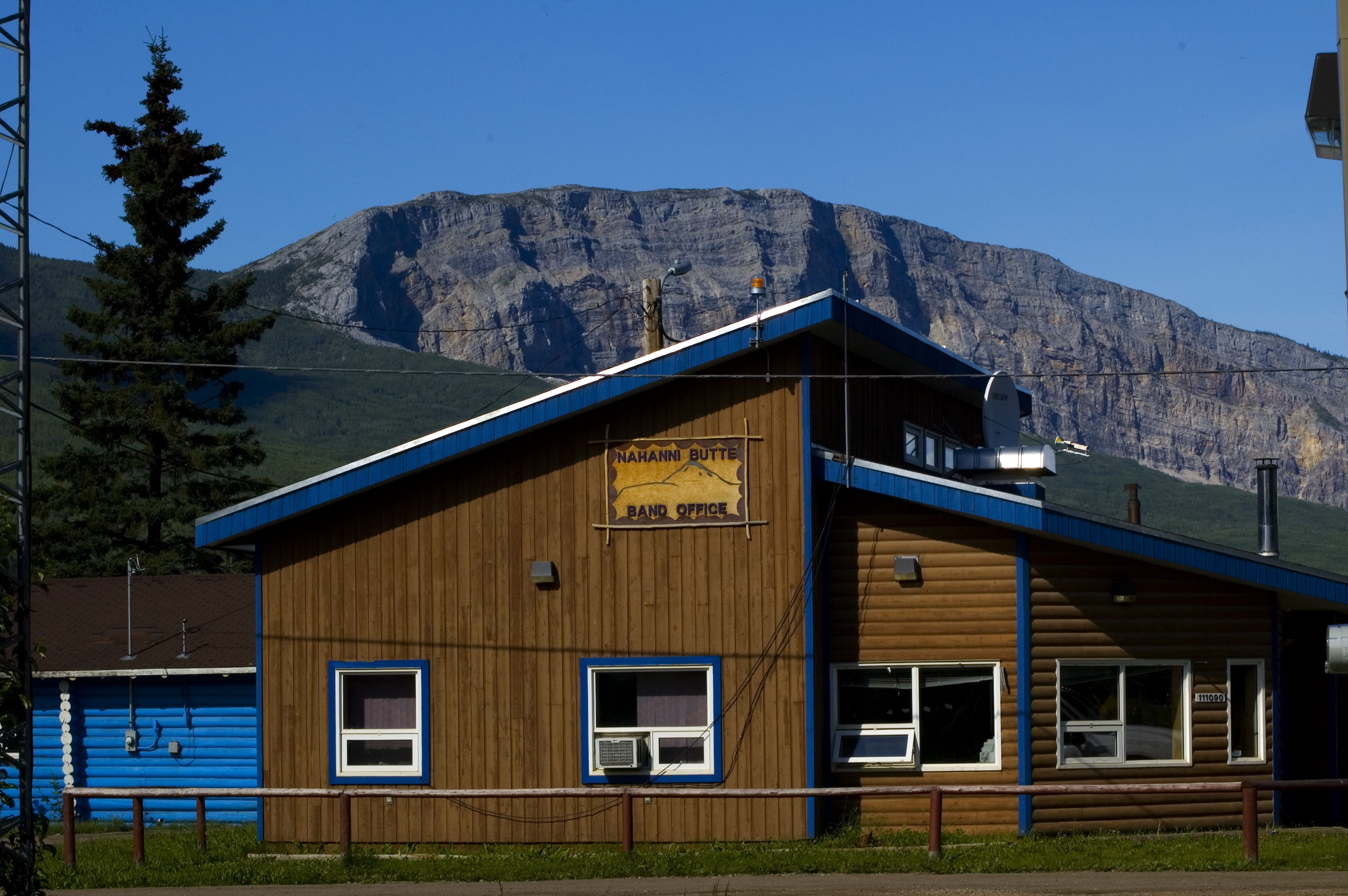
Nahanni Butte Band Office (2006)

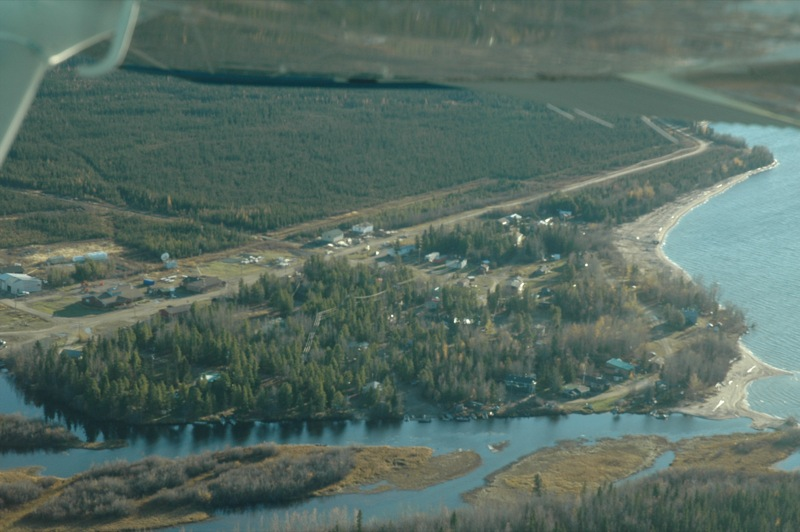
Sambaa K'e (2006)

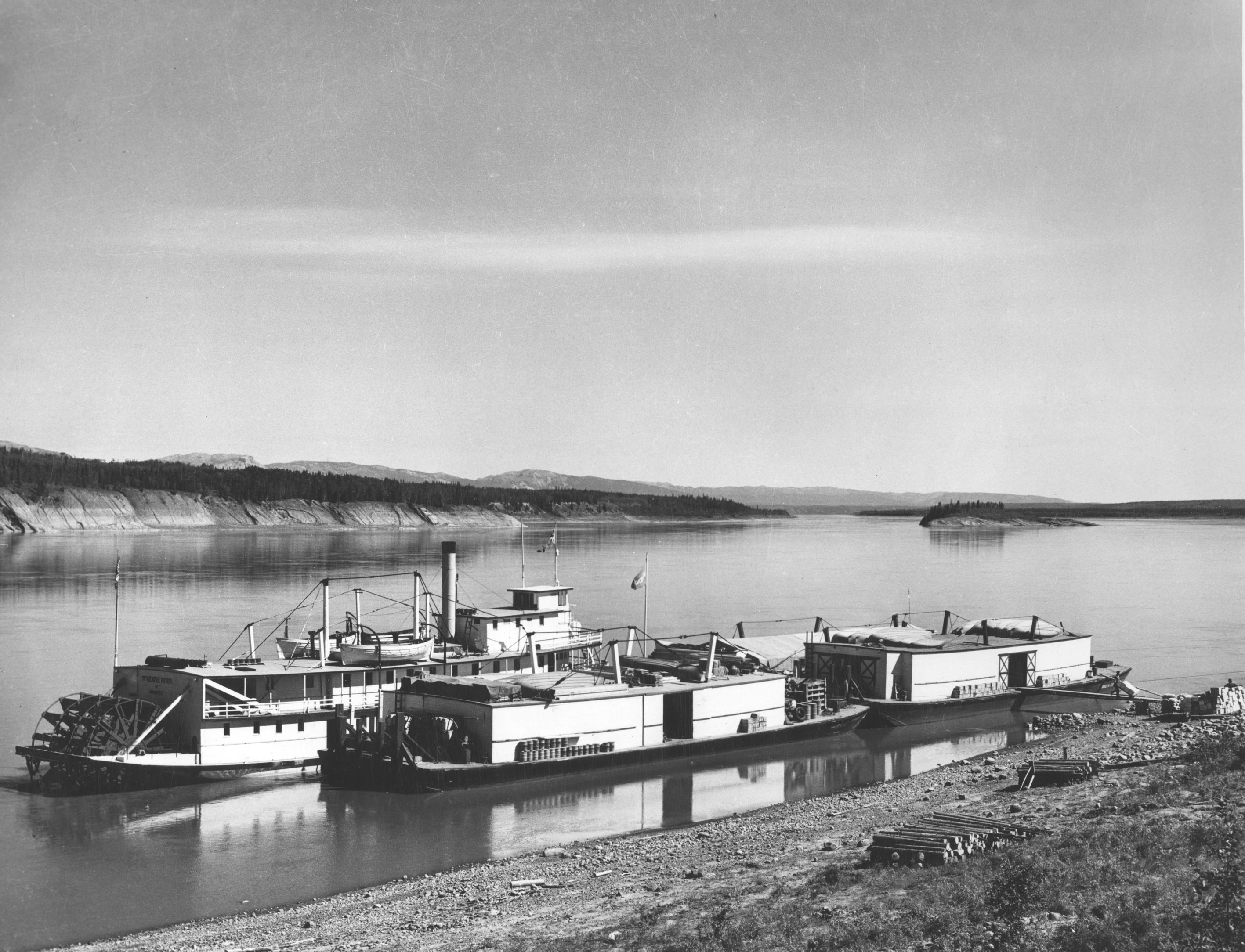
The S.S. Mackenzie River and three barges tied up at Fort Wrigley in 1946

== Climate ==
Climate data for Fort Liard (Fort Liard Airport) Climate ID: 2201575; coordinates 60°14′06″N 123°28′01″W; elevation: 215.8 m (708 ft); 1991-2020 normals, extremes 1973–present (Note: Composite data from Fort Liard A: Climate ID: 2201581; coordinates 60°14′08″N 123°28′12″W; elevation: 215.8 m (708 ft) and Fort Liard; WMO ID: 71497; coordinates 60°14′N 123°28′W; elevation: 213.4 m (700 ft))
Month	Jan	Feb	Mar	Apr	May	Jun	Jul	Aug	Sep	Oct	Nov	Dec	Year
Record high humidex	14.7	14.1	19.8	22.9	31.7	35.5	42.6	38.7	32.1	26.6	13.3	14.3	42.6
Record high °C (°F)	14.8 (58.6)	15.0 (59.0)	19.9 (67.8)	25.0 (77.0)	32.6 (90.7)	35.2 (95.4)	35.2 (95.4)	34.9 (94.8)	30.5 (86.9)	26.5 (79.7)	13.5 (56.3)	15.3 (59.5)	35.2 (95.4)
Mean daily maximum °C (°F)	−16.7 (1.9)	−10.1 (13.8)	−2.4 (27.7)	8.8 (47.8)	17.4 (63.3)	22.0 (71.6)	23.7 (74.7)	21.6 (70.9)	15.3 (59.5)	4.8 (40.6)	−8.8 (16.2)	−15.4 (4.3)	5.0 (41.0)
Daily mean °C (°F)	−20.8 (−5.4)	−15.7 (3.7)	−9.4 (15.1)	2.0 (35.6)	10.3 (50.5)	15.4 (59.7)	17.6 (63.7)	15.5 (59.9)	9.6 (49.3)	0.7 (33.3)	−12.5 (9.5)	−19.3 (−2.7)	−0.6 (30.9)
Mean daily minimum °C (°F)	−24.9 (−12.8)	−21.3 (−6.3)	−16.3 (2.7)	−4.7 (23.5)	3.2 (37.8)	8.8 (47.8)	11.4 (52.5)	9.4 (48.9)	3.9 (39.0)	−3.4 (25.9)	−16.3 (2.7)	−23.1 (−9.6)	−6.1 (21.0)
Record low °C (°F)	−46.7 (−52.1)	−44.0 (−47.2)	−38.3 (−36.9)	−30.5 (−22.9)	−14.5 (5.9)	−1.6 (29.1)	−0.1 (31.8)	−1.7 (28.9)	−11.7 (10.9)	−30.0 (−22.0)	−43.0 (−45.4)	−45.0 (−49.0)	−46.7 (−52.1)
Record low wind chill	−61.6	−51.9	−46.6	−34.3	−22.3	−3.9	0.0	0.0	−10.7	−32.4	−50.9	−53.2	−61.6
Average precipitation mm (inches)	27.0 (1.06)	19.3 (0.76)	15.2 (0.60)	15.9 (0.63)	39.5 (1.56)	71.3 (2.81)	82.2 (3.24)	54.0 (2.13)	43.4 (1.71)	27.4 (1.08)	31.0 (1.22)	22.9 (0.90)	449.2 (17.69)
Average rainfall mm (inches)	0.0 (0.0)	0.0 (0.0)	0.1 (0.00)	3.3 (0.13)	37.2 (1.46)	61.1 (2.41)	88.0 (3.46)	50.5 (1.99)	45.4 (1.79)	10.8 (0.43)	0.1 (0.00)	0.0 (0.0)	296.4 (11.67)
Average snowfall cm (inches)	30.5 (12.0)	22.8 (9.0)	17.0 (6.7)	12.2 (4.8)	1.9 (0.7)	0.0 (0.0)	0.0 (0.0)	0.0 (0.0)	2.0 (0.8)	16.8 (6.6)	35.4 (13.9)	26.7 (10.5)	165.3 (65.1)
Average precipitation days (≥ 0.2 mm)	9.2	7.7	7.0	4.9	9.8	10.7	12.3	12.2	10.9	8.6	10.1	8.1	111.3
Average rainy days (≥ 0.2 mm)	0.0	0.0	0.1	1.8	8.9	9.7	11.5	10.8	10.8	3.9	0.1	0.0	57.4
Average snowy days (≥ 0.2 cm)	9.0	7.4	7.5	3.2	1.0	0.0	0.0	0.0	0.8	5.4	10.1	7.4	51.8
Average relative humidity (%) (at 1500 LST)	70.9	62.9	49.6	40.7	37.4	46.7	49.8	51.3	53.0	66.4	74.9	74.8	56.6
Source: Environment and Climate Change Canada (June maximum) (August maximum)

Climate data for Fort Simpson (Fort Simpson Airport) WMO ID: 71946; coordinates 61°45′37″N 121°14′12″W; elevation: 169.2 m (555 ft); 1991–2020 normals, extremes 1895–present (Note: Climate data was recorded in Fort Simpson from November 1895 to October 1963 and at Fort Simpson Airport from November 1963 to present. Composite data from Fort Simpson Airport; WMO ID: 71946; coordinates 61°45′37″N 121°14′12″W; elevation: 169.5 m (556 ft) and Fort Simpson Climate; WMO ID: 71365; coordinates 61°45′37″N 121°14′12″W; elevation: 168.0 m (551.2 ft). Sunshine from 1981–2010)
Month	Jan	Feb	Mar	Apr	May	Jun	Jul	Aug	Sep	Oct	Nov	Dec	Year
Record high humidex	12.0	13.9	16.5	26.4	31.8	35.8	41.3	39.7	32.2	24.0	11.3	14.0	41.3
Record high °C (°F)	13.2 (55.8)	15.6 (60.1)	17.2 (63.0)	25.5 (77.9)	32.8 (91.0)	35.0 (95.0)	36.6 (97.9)	35.4 (95.7)	30.9 (87.6)	30.6 (87.1)	13.3 (55.9)	14.5 (58.1)	36.6 (97.9)
Mean daily maximum °C (°F)	−19.3 (−2.7)	−14.2 (6.4)	−6.0 (21.2)	5.7 (42.3)	15.9 (60.6)	21.9 (71.4)	23.8 (74.8)	21.1 (70.0)	14.1 (57.4)	2.4 (36.3)	−10.6 (12.9)	−17.5 (0.5)	3.1 (37.6)
Daily mean °C (°F)	−23.6 (−10.5)	−19.5 (−3.1)	−12.5 (9.5)	−0.5 (31.1)	9.3 (48.7)	15.6 (60.1)	17.7 (63.9)	15.1 (59.2)	8.5 (47.3)	−1.4 (29.5)	−14.5 (5.9)	−21.6 (−6.9)	−2.3 (27.9)
Mean daily minimum °C (°F)	−27.8 (−18.0)	−24.7 (−12.5)	−19.1 (−2.4)	−6.7 (19.9)	2.8 (37.0)	9.2 (48.6)	11.5 (52.7)	9.0 (48.2)	2.9 (37.2)	−5.1 (22.8)	−18.4 (−1.1)	−25.7 (−14.3)	−7.7 (18.1)
Record low °C (°F)	−54.4 (−65.9)	−56.2 (−69.2)	−46.7 (−52.1)	−39.4 (−38.9)	−22.8 (−9.0)	−2.2 (28.0)	−1.1 (30.0)	−6.1 (21.0)	−20.6 (−5.1)	−27.8 (−18.0)	−46.1 (−51.0)	−53.3 (−63.9)	−53.3 (−63.9)
Record low wind chill	−58.9	−54.8	−48.5	−44.3	−24.7	−5.9	−2.7	−4.9	−23.7	−35.5	−53.2	−59.6	−59.6
Average precipitation mm (inches)	18.1 (0.71)	16.2 (0.64)	14.8 (0.58)	15.5 (0.61)	30.3 (1.19)	55.8 (2.20)	56.5 (2.22)	59.5 (2.34)	32.4 (1.28)	31.9 (1.26)	22.3 (0.88)	17.4 (0.69)	370.5 (14.59)
Average rainfall mm (inches)	0.1 (0.00)	0.1 (0.00)	0.2 (0.01)	1.5 (0.06)	23.8 (0.94)	57.2 (2.25)	59.2 (2.33)	64.5 (2.54)	31.3 (1.23)	12.1 (0.48)	0.2 (0.01)	0.0 (0.0)	249.9 (9.84)
Average snowfall cm (inches)	30.9 (12.2)	25.6 (10.1)	20.0 (7.9)	17.8 (7.0)	8.1 (3.2)	0.6 (0.2)	0.0 (0.0)	0.0 (0.0)	3.9 (1.5)	24.1 (9.5)	36.4 (14.3)	27.8 (10.9)	195.2 (76.9)
Average precipitation days (≥ 0.2 mm)	12.6	11.0	9.5	6.1	8.5	11.7	12.0	11.8	10.4	12.1	11.9	11.7	129.0
Average rainy days (≥ 0.2 mm)	0.2	0.1	0.3	1.0	7.2	11.0	12.0	11.6	9.8	4.6	0.3	0.0	58.1
Average snowy days (≥ 0.2 cm)	12.6	11.6	9.6	4.9	2.2	0.1	0.0	0.1	1.4	8.7	12.8	12.3	76.0
Average relative humidity (%) (at 1500 LST)	78.4	75.3	66.1	50.6	41.2	44.9	49.9	53.6	58.2	76.4	82.4	80.2	63.1
Mean monthly sunshine hours	55.7	95.1	180.6	248.6	293.4	313.0	307.1	263.8	163.9	77.8	49.4	30.0	2,078.3
Percentage possible sunshine	28.5	38.0	49.6	56.3	53.8	53.7	53.3	53.4	42.0	25.0	22.8	17.7	41.2
Source: Environment and Climate Change Canada (January minimum) (February maximum / minimum) (March minimum) (April minimum) (May minimumm) (June maximum) (August minimum) (October maximum / minimum) (November maximum / minimum) (December minimum) (sunshine)

Climate data for Wrigley (Wrigley Airport) Climate ID: 2204000; coordinates 63°12′34″N 123°26′12″W; elevation: 149.7 m (491 ft); 1981-2010 normals (Note: Composite data from Wrigley Airport: Climate ID: 2204005; coordinates 63°12′35″N 123°26′12″W; elevation: 149.7 m (491 ft), temperature extremes, humidex, and wind chill taken from 1991-2020 normals)
Month	Jan	Feb	Mar	Apr	May	Jun	Jul	Aug	Sep	Oct	Nov	Dec	Year
Record high humidex	11.2	10.0	18.8	24.0	30.4	38.1	37.9	36.9	29.8	21.3	7.2	11.0	38.1
Record high °C (°F)	6.5 (43.7)	11.1 (52.0)	19.0 (66.2)	25.0 (77.0)	34.0 (93.2)	37.0 (98.6)	35.8 (96.4)	33.5 (92.3)	28.3 (82.9)	21.7 (71.1)	8.9 (48.0)	11.7 (53.1)	37.0 (98.6)
Mean daily maximum °C (°F)	−21.1 (−6.0)	−17.1 (1.2)	−7.9 (17.8)	5.0 (41.0)	14.6 (58.3)	21.7 (71.1)	23.4 (74.1)	19.9 (67.8)	12.5 (54.5)	−0.3 (31.5)	−14.8 (5.4)	−18.6 (−1.5)	1.5 (34.7)
Daily mean °C (°F)	−25.4 (−13.7)	−22.1 (−7.8)	−15.0 (5.0)	−1.7 (28.9)	8.0 (46.4)	15.0 (59.0)	16.9 (62.4)	13.6 (56.5)	7.1 (44.8)	−3.8 (25.2)	−18.7 (−1.7)	−22.7 (−8.9)	−4.1 (24.6)
Mean daily minimum °C (°F)	−29.7 (−21.5)	−27.2 (−17.0)	−22.1 (−7.8)	−8.3 (17.1)	1.3 (34.3)	8.2 (46.8)	10.3 (50.5)	7.2 (45.0)	1.6 (34.9)	−7.4 (18.7)	−22.5 (−8.5)	−26.7 (−16.1)	−9.6 (14.7)
Record low °C (°F)	−51.7 (−61.1)	−53.3 (−63.9)	−46.7 (−52.1)	−36.1 (−33.0)	−20.9 (−5.6)	−3.9 (25.0)	−1.1 (30.0)	−6.0 (21.2)	−18.0 (−0.4)	−31.5 (−24.7)	−48.0 (−54.4)	−49.4 (−56.9)	−53.3 (−63.9)
Record low wind chill	−54.6	−52.7	−48.3	−39.4	−25.5	−1.9	−1.6	−3.2	−13.3	−28.5	−49.1	−57.7	−57.7
Average precipitation mm (inches)	16.7 (0.66)	14.6 (0.57)	10.4 (0.41)	8.1 (0.32)	22.0 (0.87)	43.5 (1.71)	64.0 (2.52)	49.5 (1.95)	35.9 (1.41)	29.4 (1.16)	20.5 (0.81)	18.1 (0.71)	332.6 (13.09)
Average rainfall mm (inches)	0.0 (0.0)	0.0 (0.0)	0.0 (0.0)	0.3 (0.01)	18.4 (0.72)	43.5 (1.71)	64.0 (2.52)	49.5 (1.95)	32.3 (1.27)	7.6 (0.30)	0.0 (0.0)	0.0 (0.0)	215.5 (8.48)
Average snowfall cm (inches)	19.1 (7.5)	15.4 (6.1)	10.9 (4.3)	8.9 (3.5)	3.8 (1.5)	0.0 (0.0)	0.0 (0.0)	0.0 (0.0)	3.4 (1.3)	21.8 (8.6)	22.6 (8.9)	18.9 (7.4)	124.7 (49.1)
Average precipitation days (≥ 0.2 mm)	8.0	6.4	5.6	3.3	6.4	8.4	9.7	9.0	9.2	9.7	9.0	7.5	92.1
Average rainy days (≥ 0.2 mm)	0.0	0.0	0.0	0.4	5.6	8.2	9.7	9.0	8.3	2.2	0.1	0.0	43.3
Average snowy days (≥ 0.2 cm)	8.0	6.4	5.6	2.9	1.1	0.0	0.0	0.0	1.1	7.9	9.1	7.5	49.4
Source: Environment and Climate Change Canada (1981-2010 normals) (temperature extremes, humidex, and wind chill 1991-2020) (July maximum)
