= Kevin Menicoche =

Canadian politician (born 1961)

Kevin A. Menicoche

Member of the Legislative Assembly of the Northwest Territories
- In office November 24, 2003 – 2015
- Preceded by: Jim Antoine
- Succeeded by: Shane Thompson
- Constituency: Nahendeh

Personal details
- Born: October 7, 1961 (age 64)
- Party: Independent

Kevin A. Menicoche (born October 7, 1961) is a former member of the legislature and former cabinet minister in the Northwest Territories, Canada, who represented Nahendeh from 2003 to 2015.

== Political career ==
Menicoche ran for a seat in the 2003 Northwest Territories general election and defeated seven other candidates with 34% of the vote to win the Nahendeh electoral district. Menicoche was appointed to the Executive Council in October 2006 and served as the Minister of Transportation and Minister Responsible for the Public Utilities Board portfolios.

He was re-elected in the 2007 Northwest Territories general election, and was a regular member.
