= Michael Ballantyne =

Canadian politician

Member of the Legislative Assembly of the Northwest Territories
- In office 1983–1995
- Preceded by: George Braden
- Succeeded by: Roy Erasmus
- Constituency: Yellowknife North

Speaker of the Legislative Assembly of Northwest Territories
- In office 1991–1993
- Preceded by: Richard Nerysoo
- Succeeded by: Jeannie Marie-Jewell

Personal details
- Born: February 27, 1945 Toronto, Ontario, Canada
- Died: June 19, 2008 (aged 63) Edmonton, Alberta
- Party: non-partisan consensus government

Michael Alan Ballantyne (February 27, 1945 – June 19, 2008) was a Canadian politician and humanitarian. He was a city councillor for Yellowknife City Council from 1978 and in 1979 became mayor until his resignation in 1983. He served as a Member and Speaker of the Legislative Assembly of the Northwest Territories from 1983 to 1995.

Ballantyne was elected to the Northwest Territories Legislature in the 1983 Northwest Territories general election, winning the Yellowknife North electoral district. He was re-elected to a second term in the 1987 Northwest Territories general election. He was re-elected to his third and final term in the 1991 Northwest Territories general election. Ballantyne was elected Speaker of the Assembly on November 13, 1991 and served in that position until November 10, 1993. He retired at the end of his term when the Legislature dissolved in 1995.

Ballantyne was a seasoned traveler and humanitarian, working with Save the Children in both Vietnam and Cambodia during the Vietnam war. Ballantyne quit Carleton University in Ottawa to register black voters in Mississippi and Alabama and was active in the civil rights movement.

Ballantyne died on June 19, 2008.
