= Wendy Bisaro =

Canadian politician

Member of the Legislative Assembly of the Northwest Territories
- In office October 1, 2007 – 2015
- Preceded by: Charles Dent
- Succeeded by: Kevin O'Reilly
- Constituency: Frame Lake

Personal details
- Born: Montreal, Quebec
- Party: non-partisan consensus government

Wendy Bisaro is a Canadian politician who represented Frame Lake in the Legislative Assembly of the Northwest Territories from 2007 to 2015.

== Early life and education ==
Bisaro was born in Montreal, Quebec, and in 1968 earned a bachelor of education degree from McGill University with a specialty in physical education.

== Career ==
After teaching high school in Montreal, she moved to Yellowknife in 1971 and taught at Sir John Franklin High School. From 1985 to its closure in 2004, she worked at Mack Travel; she then became an adult instructor for Canadian North.

In sport, she played for, coached, and was an organizer in the Yellowknife Basketball Association and the Yellowknife Ladies Softball Association and was a co-founder of Sport North, where she served as vice president from 1984 to 1988. She competed, coached, and was a member of the mission staff for the Canada Games, competed in the Arctic Winter Games and was Northwest Territories Chef de Mission for the 1984 games and a director of the Host Society for the 1988 games and vice president of the Host Society for the 2008 games.

== Political career ==
Bisaro was elected in 1988 to the board of trustees for Yellowknife Education District #1, and served four terms, for five years as board chair, until 2000, when she successfully ran for election to Yellowknife City Council. She was re-elected in 2003 to a second term, during which she was chosen to be deputy mayor.

In the 2007 provincial election she was elected MLA for Frame Lake, succeeding Charles Dent, who did not run for reelection. She defeated two other candidates with 56% of the vote. Voter turnout was low at 45%. In 2011 she won reelection with 55% of the vote against two other candidates. Turnout was 30%. She was elected chairperson of the Standing Committee on Priorities and Planning in May 2013. She declined to run for a third term in 2015.
