= Rylund Johnson =

Canadian politician

Rylund Johnson MLA

Member of the Legislative Assembly of the Northwest Territories
- In office October 1, 2019 – November 14, 2023
- Preceded by: Cory Vanthuyne
- Succeeded by: Shauna Morgan
- Constituency: Yellowknife North

Personal details
- Born: Summerland, British Columbia
- Party: Green (federal)
- Occupation: Lawyer

Rylund Johnson is a Canadian politician, who was elected to the Legislative Assembly of the Northwest Territories in the 2019 election. He represented the electoral district of Yellowknife North.

== Political positions ==
Johnson is a member of the federal Green Party, describing himself as a part of the "millenial green wave addressing political apathy." He proposed that the Northwest Territories Power Corporation bring in revenue through district heating, which would therefore reduce greenhouse gas emissions.

Johnson is an advocate for drug decriminalization following similar actions in the city of Vancouver. Johnson also supports a system of guaranteed basic income and advocated for the implementation of such a system with fellow Frame Lake MLA Kevin O'Reilly.

== Personal life ==
Johnson worked as a lawyer and as a co-founder of Makerspace YK, a nonprofit. He was formerly an admin for the BDSM workshop group Northern Bound.

Johnson was the target of parody in a YouTube video titled "The Greatest Speech Never Heard in the NWT Legislative Assembly," which was originally shared on the Dehcho First Nations Facebook page and subsequently acknowledged by him.

When he was elected as a Member of the Legislative Assembly of the Northwest Territories, he lived on a houseboat named the Scandimaniac, which also is the name of his podcast. Johnson moved to the Northwest Territories in 2015.
