= Bisaro =

Bisaro is a surname. Notable people with the surname include:

- Kiara Bisaro (born 1975), Canadian mountain biker
- Wendy Bisaro, Canadian teacher and politician
