= 2023 Canadian Senior Curling Championships =

Canadian national curling championship edition

2023 Everest Canadian Senior Curling Championships
- Host city: Vernon, British Columbia
- Arena: Vernon Curling Club
- Dates: December 3–9, 2023
- Men's winner: Nova Scotia
- Curling club: Halifax CC, Halifax
- Skip: Paul Flemming
- Third: Peter Burgess
- Second: Martin Gavin
- Lead: Kris Granchelli
- Finalist: Saskatchewan (Korte)
- Women's winner: Ontario
- Curling club: Alliston CC, Alliston
- Skip: Susan Froud
- Third: Kerry Lackie
- Second: Kristin Turcotte
- Lead: Julie McMullin
- Finalist: Saskatchewan (Martin)

The 2023 Everest Canadian Senior Curling Championships were held from December 3 to 9 at the Vernon Curling Club in Vernon, British Columbia. The winning teams will represent Canada at the 2024 World Senior Curling Championships in Östersund, Sweden.

It is Vernon's third time hosting the Everest Canadian Senior Women's Championship and second time hosting the Everest Canadian Senior Men's Championship.

Paul Flemming and his Nova Scotia rink of Peter Burgess, Martin Gavin and Kris Granchell won the men's event, defeating Saskatchewan's Bruce Korte rink in the final, 4–3. Flemming made an open hit for the win on his last rock. It was the second men's senior championship for the province. During the event, Flemming had a chest infection which involved going to the hospital.

Susan Froud and her Ontario team of Kerry Lackie, Kristin Turcotte and Julie McMullin won the women's event, defeating Saskatchewan 10–4. After trailing 4–2 after the fourth, Ontario scored eight unanswered points, including steals of three in the sixth and seventh ends to claim victory. The win is the 11th women's title for Ontario, tying the province with Saskatchewan for the most.

== Men ==
=== Teams ===
The teams are listed as follows:

| Team | Skip | Third | Second | Lead | Alternate | Club |
|---|---|---|---|---|---|---|
| Alberta | James Pahl | Mark Klinck | Kelly Mauthe | John Schmidt | Cory Wilson | Sherwood Park CC, Sherwood Park |
| British Columbia | Wes Craig | Norm Coté | Keith Clarke | Ron Schmidt | | Duncan CC, Duncan |
| Manitoba | Dave Boehmer | Dale Lott | Sean Bracken | George Hacking | Scott Szydlik | Petersfield CC, Petersfield |
| New Brunswick | Mike Kennedy | Grant Odishaw | Marc LeCocq | Vance LeCocq | | Grand Falls CC, Grand Falls; Curl Moncton, Moncton |
| Newfoundland and Labrador | Alex Smith | Mark Noseworthy | Mark Healy | Steve Bragg | | St. John's CC, St. John's |
| Northern Ontario | Ron Rosengren | Gary Maunula | Dale Wiersema | Bill Peloza | | Port Arthur CC, Thunder Bay |
| Northwest Territories | Cory Vanthuyne | Tom Naugler | Brad Patzer | Quentin Deering | | Yellowknife CC, Yellowknife |
| Nova Scotia | Paul Flemming | Peter Burgess | Martin Gavin | Kris Granchelli | | Halifax CC, Halifax |
| Nunavut | Peter Mackey | Jeff Nadeau | Greg Howard | Jamie Gauthier | | Iqaluit CC, Iqaluit |
| Ontario | Bryan Cochrane | Ian MacAulay | Graham Sinclair | Ken Sullivan | John Rothwell | Russell CC, Russell |
| Prince Edward Island | Philip Gorveatt | Kevin Champion | Sean Ledgerwood | Mike Dillon | | Montague CC, Montague |
| Quebec | François Roberge | Maxime Elmaleh | Éric Sylvain | Jean Gagnon | | CC Etchemin, Saint-Romuald |
| Saskatchewan | Bruce Korte | Darrell McKee | Kory Kohuch | Rory Golanowski | Arlen Hall | Nutana CC, Saskatoon |
| Yukon | Terry Miller | Chris Meger | Doug Hamilton | Don McPhee | | Whitehorse CC, Whitehorse |

=== Round robin standings ===
Final Round Robin Standings

Key
| Teams to Championship Round |

| Pool A | Skip | W | L |
|---|---|---|---|
| Nova Scotia | Paul Flemming | 5 | 1 |
| New Brunswick | Mike Kennedy | 4 | 2 |
| Manitoba | Dave Boehmer | 4 | 2 |
| Quebec | François Roberge | 4 | 2 |
| Ontario | Bryan Cochrane | 3 | 3 |
| Yukon | Terry Miller | 1 | 5 |
| Northwest Territories | Cory Vanthuyne | 0 | 6 |

| Pool B | Skip | W | L |
|---|---|---|---|
| Saskatchewan | Bruce Korte | 6 | 0 |
| British Columbia | Wes Craig | 5 | 1 |
| Prince Edward Island | Philip Gorveatt | 4 | 2 |
| Newfoundland and Labrador | Alex Smith | 3 | 3 |
| Northern Ontario | Ron Rosengren | 2 | 4 |
| Alberta | James Pahl | 1 | 5 |
| Nunavut | Peter Mackey | 0 | 6 |

=== Round robin results ===
All draws are listed in Pacific Time (UTC−08:00).

==== Draw 1 ====
Sunday, December 3, 4:00 pm

| Sheet 3 | 1 | 2 | 3 | 4 | 5 | 6 | 7 | 8 | Final |
| Northwest Territories (Vanthuyne) | 0 | 0 | 0 | 1 | 0 | 1 | 0 | X | 2 |
| New Brunswick (Kennedy) | 0 | 2 | 3 | 0 | 1 | 0 | 1 | X | 7 |

| Sheet 4 | 1 | 2 | 3 | 4 | 5 | 6 | 7 | 8 | Final |
| Nunavut (Mackey) | 0 | 0 | 0 | 0 | 0 | 1 | X | X | 1 |
| Newfoundland and Labrador (Smith) | 3 | 1 | 1 | 1 | 1 | 0 | X | X | 7 |

| Sheet 6 | 1 | 2 | 3 | 4 | 5 | 6 | 7 | 8 | Final |
| Nova Scotia (Flemming) | 1 | 1 | 2 | 0 | 2 | 0 | 1 | X | 7 |
| Ontario (Cochrane) | 0 | 0 | 0 | 1 | 0 | 1 | 0 | X | 2 |

==== Draw 2 ====
Sunday, December 3, 8:00 pm

| Sheet 2 | 1 | 2 | 3 | 4 | 5 | 6 | 7 | 8 | Final |
| Yukon (Miller) | 1 | 0 | 0 | 1 | 0 | 0 | X | X | 2 |
| Quebec (Roberge) | 0 | 1 | 5 | 0 | 1 | 1 | X | X | 8 |

| Sheet 3 | 1 | 2 | 3 | 4 | 5 | 6 | 7 | 8 | Final |
| Prince Edward Island (Gorveatt) | 0 | 0 | 0 | 0 | 2 | 0 | X | X | 2 |
| Saskatchewan (Korte) | 1 | 1 | 1 | 2 | 0 | 3 | X | X | 8 |

| Sheet 5 | 1 | 2 | 3 | 4 | 5 | 6 | 7 | 8 | Final |
| Northern Ontario (Rosengren) | 2 | 0 | 3 | 0 | 0 | 1 | 0 | 3 | 9 |
| Alberta (Pahl) | 0 | 1 | 0 | 0 | 1 | 0 | 2 | 0 | 4 |

==== Draw 3 ====
Monday, December 4, 10:00 am

| Sheet 1 | 1 | 2 | 3 | 4 | 5 | 6 | 7 | 8 | Final |
| Ontario (Cochrane) | 1 | 0 | 2 | 0 | 0 | 0 | 0 | X | 3 |
| Manitoba (Boehmer) | 0 | 1 | 0 | 2 | 1 | 1 | 3 | X | 8 |

| Sheet 2 | 1 | 2 | 3 | 4 | 5 | 6 | 7 | 8 | Final |
| Alberta (Pahl) | 0 | 2 | 0 | 1 | 0 | 0 | X | X | 3 |
| British Columbia (Craig) | 3 | 0 | 5 | 0 | 1 | 0 | X | X | 9 |

| Sheet 5 | 1 | 2 | 3 | 4 | 5 | 6 | 7 | 8 | Final |
| Saskatchewan (Korte) | 4 | 0 | 1 | 2 | 2 | 0 | X | X | 9 |
| Nunavut (Mackey) | 0 | 1 | 0 | 0 | 0 | 1 | X | X | 2 |

| Sheet 8 | 1 | 2 | 3 | 4 | 5 | 6 | 7 | 8 | Final |
| Quebec (Roberge) | 0 | 2 | 2 | 3 | 0 | 1 | X | X | 8 |
| Northwest Territories (Vanthuyne) | 1 | 0 | 0 | 0 | 1 | 0 | X | X | 2 |

==== Draw 4 ====
Monday, December 4, 2:00 pm

| Sheet 1 | 1 | 2 | 3 | 4 | 5 | 6 | 7 | 8 | Final |
| Nova Scotia (Flemming) | 0 | 2 | 1 | 0 | 0 | 1 | 2 | X | 6 |
| Yukon (Miller) | 1 | 0 | 0 | 2 | 0 | 0 | 0 | X | 3 |

| Sheet 2 | 1 | 2 | 3 | 4 | 5 | 6 | 7 | 8 | Final |
| Northern Ontario (Rosengren) | 0 | 1 | 0 | 2 | 0 | 0 | 0 | 0 | 3 |
| Prince Edward Island (Gorveatt) | 2 | 0 | 0 | 0 | 0 | 1 | 0 | 2 | 5 |

| Sheet 5 | 1 | 2 | 3 | 4 | 5 | 6 | 7 | 8 | Final |
| Manitoba (Boehmer) | 0 | 2 | 0 | 0 | 0 | 2 | 0 | 2 | 6 |
| New Brunswick (Kennedy) | 2 | 0 | 0 | 1 | 0 | 0 | 2 | 0 | 5 |

| Sheet 6 | 1 | 2 | 3 | 4 | 5 | 6 | 7 | 8 | 9 | Final |
| British Columbia (Craig) | 1 | 2 | 0 | 0 | 4 | 0 | 1 | 0 | 2 | 10 |
| Newfoundland and Labrador (Smith) | 0 | 0 | 2 | 2 | 0 | 3 | 0 | 1 | 0 | 8 |

==== Draw 5 ====
Monday, December 4, 6:00 pm

| Sheet 3 | 1 | 2 | 3 | 4 | 5 | 6 | 7 | 8 | Final |
| Quebec (Roberge) | 3 | 0 | 1 | 0 | 0 | 1 | 0 | X | 5 |
| Nova Scotia (Flemming) | 0 | 3 | 0 | 1 | 1 | 0 | 3 | X | 8 |

| Sheet 4 | 1 | 2 | 3 | 4 | 5 | 6 | 7 | 8 | Final |
| Saskatchewan (Korte) | 0 | 3 | 1 | 4 | 3 | 0 | X | X | 11 |
| Northern Ontario (Rosengren) | 1 | 0 | 0 | 0 | 0 | 1 | X | X | 2 |

| Sheet 7 | 1 | 2 | 3 | 4 | 5 | 6 | 7 | 8 | Final |
| Ontario (Cochrane) | 2 | 1 | 1 | 1 | 2 | 0 | X | X | 7 |
| Northwest Territories (Vanthuyne) | 0 | 0 | 0 | 0 | 0 | 1 | X | X | 1 |

| Sheet 8 | 1 | 2 | 3 | 4 | 5 | 6 | 7 | 8 | Final |
| Alberta (Pahl) | 3 | 0 | 2 | 1 | 0 | 2 | X | X | 8 |
| Nunavut (Mackey) | 0 | 1 | 0 | 0 | 0 | 0 | X | X | 1 |

==== Draw 6 ====
Tuesday, December 5, 10:00 am

| Sheet 1 | 1 | 2 | 3 | 4 | 5 | 6 | 7 | 8 | Final |
| British Columbia (Craig) | 1 | 0 | 1 | 1 | 0 | 0 | 2 | 0 | 5 |
| Saskatchewan (Korte) | 0 | 2 | 0 | 0 | 2 | 1 | 0 | 1 | 6 |

| Sheet 4 | 1 | 2 | 3 | 4 | 5 | 6 | 7 | 8 | Final |
| Manitoba (Boehmer) | 0 | 2 | 1 | 0 | 0 | 0 | 1 | X | 4 |
| Quebec (Roberge) | 1 | 0 | 0 | 1 | 2 | 2 | 0 | X | 6 |

| Sheet 6 | 1 | 2 | 3 | 4 | 5 | 6 | 7 | 8 | Final |
| Northwest Territories (Vanthuyne) | 0 | 0 | 0 | 1 | 2 | 0 | 2 | 0 | 5 |
| Yukon (Miller) | 2 | 1 | 0 | 0 | 0 | 2 | 0 | 1 | 6 |

| Sheet 7 | 1 | 2 | 3 | 4 | 5 | 6 | 7 | 8 | Final |
| Nunavut (Mackey) | 2 | 0 | 0 | 0 | 0 | 1 | X | X | 3 |
| Prince Edward Island (Gorveatt) | 0 | 2 | 3 | 2 | 2 | 0 | X | X | 9 |

==== Draw 7 ====
Tuesday, December 5, 2:00 pm

| Sheet 1 | 1 | 2 | 3 | 4 | 5 | 6 | 7 | 8 | Final |
| Northern Ontario (Rosengren) | 2 | 0 | 2 | 0 | 3 | 0 | 1 | X | 8 |
| Nunavut (Mackey) | 0 | 0 | 0 | 1 | 0 | 1 | 0 | X | 2 |

| Sheet 2 | 1 | 2 | 3 | 4 | 5 | 6 | 7 | 8 | Final |
| New Brunswick (Kennedy) | 0 | 1 | 0 | 0 | 1 | 0 | 3 | 0 | 5 |
| Ontario (Cochrane) | 1 | 0 | 1 | 1 | 0 | 2 | 0 | 1 | 6 |

| Sheet 3 | 1 | 2 | 3 | 4 | 5 | 6 | 7 | 8 | Final |
| Saskatchewan (Korte) | 2 | 0 | 2 | 4 | 4 | 0 | X | X | 12 |
| Newfoundland and Labrador (Smith) | 0 | 1 | 0 | 0 | 0 | 1 | X | X | 2 |

| Sheet 5 | 1 | 2 | 3 | 4 | 5 | 6 | 7 | 8 | Final |
| Yukon (Miller) | 0 | 1 | 0 | 0 | 2 | 0 | X | X | 3 |
| Manitoba (Boehmer) | 1 | 0 | 3 | 1 | 0 | 4 | X | X | 9 |

==== Draw 8 ====
Tuesday, December 5, 6:00 pm

| Sheet 1 | 1 | 2 | 3 | 4 | 5 | 6 | 7 | 8 | Final |
| Newfoundland and Labrador (Smith) | 2 | 0 | 1 | 1 | 0 | 1 | 0 | 2 | 7 |
| Alberta (Pahl) | 0 | 1 | 0 | 0 | 2 | 0 | 2 | 0 | 5 |

| Sheet 4 | 1 | 2 | 3 | 4 | 5 | 6 | 7 | 8 | Final |
| Nova Scotia (Flemming) | 0 | 0 | 0 | 1 | 2 | 2 | 0 | 1 | 6 |
| Northwest Territories (Vanthuyne) | 1 | 0 | 3 | 0 | 0 | 0 | 1 | 0 | 5 |

| Sheet 6 | 1 | 2 | 3 | 4 | 5 | 6 | 7 | 8 | Final |
| Quebec (Roberge) | 0 | 0 | 2 | 0 | 1 | 0 | 2 | X | 5 |
| New Brunswick (Kennedy) | 1 | 1 | 0 | 3 | 0 | 3 | 0 | X | 8 |

| Sheet 8 | 1 | 2 | 3 | 4 | 5 | 6 | 7 | 8 | Final |
| Prince Edward Island (Gorveatt) | 0 | 0 | 2 | 0 | 1 | 1 | 0 | X | 4 |
| British Columbia (Craig) | 2 | 1 | 0 | 1 | 0 | 0 | 3 | X | 7 |

==== Draw 9 ====
Wednesday, December 6, 10:00 am

| Sheet 3 | 1 | 2 | 3 | 4 | 5 | 6 | 7 | 8 | Final |
| Yukon (Miller) | 0 | 1 | 0 | 1 | 0 | 2 | 0 | 0 | 4 |
| Ontario (Cochrane) | 2 | 0 | 1 | 0 | 1 | 0 | 3 | 2 | 9 |

| Sheet 4 | 1 | 2 | 3 | 4 | 5 | 6 | 7 | 8 | Final |
| Prince Edward Island (Gorveatt) | 1 | 1 | 3 | 1 | 0 | 1 | 0 | X | 7 |
| Alberta (Pahl) | 0 | 0 | 0 | 0 | 2 | 0 | 3 | X | 5 |

| Sheet 5 | 1 | 2 | 3 | 4 | 5 | 6 | 7 | 8 | Final |
| New Brunswick (Kennedy) | 2 | 0 | 1 | 2 | 0 | 1 | 0 | 0 | 6 |
| Nova Scotia (Flemming) | 0 | 1 | 0 | 0 | 1 | 0 | 1 | 2 | 5 |

| Sheet 7 | 1 | 2 | 3 | 4 | 5 | 6 | 7 | 8 | Final |
| Newfoundland and Labrador (Smith) | 2 | 0 | 5 | 2 | 0 | 0 | 1 | X | 10 |
| Northern Ontario (Rosengren) | 0 | 1 | 0 | 0 | 3 | 2 | 0 | X | 6 |

==== Draw 10 ====
Wednesday, December 6, 2:00 pm

| Sheet 2 | 1 | 2 | 3 | 4 | 5 | 6 | 7 | 8 | Final |
| Northwest Territories (Vanthuyne) | 1 | 1 | 0 | 1 | 0 | 0 | 0 | 0 | 3 |
| Manitoba (Boehmer) | 0 | 0 | 3 | 0 | 0 | 0 | 1 | 1 | 5 |

| Sheet 3 | 1 | 2 | 3 | 4 | 5 | 6 | 7 | 8 | Final |
| Nunavut (Mackey) | 0 | 0 | 0 | 0 | 1 | 0 | X | X | 1 |
| British Columbia (Craig) | 2 | 1 | 2 | 3 | 0 | 1 | X | X | 9 |

| Sheet 5 | 1 | 2 | 3 | 4 | 5 | 6 | 7 | 8 | Final |
| Ontario (Cochrane) | 2 | 0 | 1 | 0 | 0 | 1 | 0 | 0 | 4 |
| Quebec (Roberge) | 0 | 1 | 0 | 2 | 0 | 0 | 4 | 1 | 8 |

| Sheet 6 | 1 | 2 | 3 | 4 | 5 | 6 | 7 | 8 | Final |
| Alberta (Pahl) | 0 | 1 | 0 | 0 | 0 | 0 | X | X | 1 |
| Saskatchewan (Korte) | 1 | 0 | 1 | 3 | 2 | 0 | X | X | 7 |

==== Draw 11 ====
Wednesday, December 6, 6:00 pm

| Sheet 3 | 1 | 2 | 3 | 4 | 5 | 6 | 7 | 8 | Final |
| Newfoundland and Labrador (Smith) | 0 | 1 | 4 | 0 | 0 | 0 | 1 | 0 | 6 |
| Prince Edward Island (Gorveatt) | 3 | 0 | 0 | 1 | 1 | 1 | 0 | 1 | 7 |

| Sheet 4 | 1 | 2 | 3 | 4 | 5 | 6 | 7 | 8 | Final |
| New Brunswick (Kennedy) | 0 | 1 | 5 | 0 | 3 | 0 | 1 | X | 10 |
| Yukon (Miller) | 1 | 0 | 0 | 2 | 0 | 1 | 0 | X | 4 |

| Sheet 7 | 1 | 2 | 3 | 4 | 5 | 6 | 7 | 8 | Final |
| Manitoba (Boehmer) | 0 | 0 | 0 | 0 | 2 | 0 | 1 | X | 3 |
| Nova Scotia (Flemming) | 1 | 2 | 1 | 1 | 0 | 1 | 0 | X | 6 |

| Sheet 8 | 1 | 2 | 3 | 4 | 5 | 6 | 7 | 8 | Final |
| British Columbia (Craig) | 0 | 3 | 0 | 3 | 1 | 0 | 0 | 3 | 10 |
| Northern Ontario (Rosengren) | 2 | 0 | 2 | 0 | 0 | 1 | 3 | 0 | 8 |

=== Seeding pool ===
==== Standings ====
Final Seeding Pool Standings

| Team | Skip | W | L |
|---|---|---|---|
| Ontario | Bryan Cochrane | 6 | 3 |
| Northern Ontario | Ron Rosengren | 4 | 5 |
| Northwest Territories | Cory Vanthuyne | 2 | 7 |
| Alberta | James Pahl | 2 | 7 |
| Yukon | Terry Miller | 2 | 7 |
| Nunavut | Peter Mackey | 0 | 9 |

==== Results ====
===== Draw 12 =====
Thursday, December 7, 8:30 am

| Sheet 2 | 1 | 2 | 3 | 4 | 5 | 6 | 7 | 8 | Final |
| Ontario (Cochrane) | 5 | 0 | 2 | 0 | 3 | 1 | X | X | 11 |
| Nunavut (Mackey) | 0 | 1 | 0 | 1 | 0 | 0 | X | X | 2 |

| Sheet 4 | 1 | 2 | 3 | 4 | 5 | 6 | 7 | 8 | Final |
| Northern Ontario (Rosengren) | 4 | 1 | 1 | 2 | 1 | 0 | X | X | 9 |
| Northwest Territories (Vanthuyne) | 0 | 0 | 0 | 0 | 0 | 1 | X | X | 1 |

| Sheet 6 | 1 | 2 | 3 | 4 | 5 | 6 | 7 | 8 | Final |
| Alberta (Pahl) | 1 | 0 | 0 | 3 | 0 | 5 | X | X | 9 |
| Yukon (Miller) | 0 | 1 | 0 | 0 | 1 | 0 | X | X | 2 |

===== Draw 14 =====
Thursday, December 7, 4:30 pm

| Sheet 2 | 1 | 2 | 3 | 4 | 5 | 6 | 7 | 8 | Final |
| Yukon (Miller) | 0 | 1 | 0 | 1 | 0 | 0 | 3 | 0 | 5 |
| Northern Ontario (Rosengren) | 2 | 0 | 3 | 0 | 2 | 0 | 0 | 1 | 8 |

| Sheet 4 | 1 | 2 | 3 | 4 | 5 | 6 | 7 | 8 | Final |
| Alberta (Pahl) | 0 | 1 | 0 | 0 | 0 | 1 | X | X | 2 |
| Ontario (Cochrane) | 0 | 0 | 3 | 1 | 4 | 0 | X | X | 8 |

| Sheet 6 | 1 | 2 | 3 | 4 | 5 | 6 | 7 | 8 | Final |
| Nunavut (Mackey) | 1 | 1 | 0 | 0 | 0 | 1 | 0 | X | 3 |
| Northwest Territories (Vanthuyne) | 0 | 0 | 4 | 1 | 0 | 0 | 3 | X | 8 |

===== Draw 17 =====
Friday, December 8, 2:00 pm

| Sheet 1 | 1 | 2 | 3 | 4 | 5 | 6 | 7 | 8 | Final |
| Yukon (Miller) | 1 | 0 | 2 | 0 | 0 | 3 | 0 | X | 6 |
| Nunavut (Mackey) | 0 | 3 | 0 | 0 | 1 | 0 | 0 | X | 4 |

| Sheet 3 | 1 | 2 | 3 | 4 | 5 | 6 | 7 | 8 | Final |
| Ontario (Cochrane) | 0 | 1 | 0 | 1 | 0 | 1 | 0 | 1 | 4 |
| Northern Ontario (Rosengren) | 1 | 0 | 1 | 0 | 0 | 0 | 1 | 0 | 3 |

| Sheet 5 | 1 | 2 | 3 | 4 | 5 | 6 | 7 | 8 | 9 | Final |
| Northwest Territories (Vanthuyne) | 0 | 0 | 2 | 0 | 1 | 0 | 2 | 2 | 1 | 8 |
| Alberta (Pahl) | 1 | 1 | 0 | 1 | 0 | 4 | 0 | 0 | 0 | 7 |

=== Championship pool ===
==== Standings ====
Final Championship Pool Standings

Key
| Teams to Playoffs |

| Team | Skip | W | L |
|---|---|---|---|
| Nova Scotia | Paul Flemming | 8 | 2 |
| Manitoba | Dave Boehmer | 8 | 2 |
| Saskatchewan | Bruce Korte | 8 | 2 |
| New Brunswick | Mike Kennedy | 7 | 3 |
| British Columbia | Wes Craig | 7 | 3 |
| Quebec | François Roberge | 5 | 5 |
| Prince Edward Island | Philip Gorveatt | 4 | 6 |
| Newfoundland and Labrador | Alex Smith | 4 | 6 |

==== Results ====
===== Draw 13 =====
Thursday, December 7, 12:30 pm

| Sheet 5 | 1 | 2 | 3 | 4 | 5 | 6 | 7 | 8 | Final |
| Nova Scotia (Flemming) | 2 | 0 | 2 | 0 | 0 | 1 | 0 | 1 | 6 |
| Newfoundland and Labrador (Smith) | 0 | 1 | 0 | 2 | 0 | 0 | 2 | 0 | 5 |

| Sheet 6 | 1 | 2 | 3 | 4 | 5 | 6 | 7 | 8 | Final |
| New Brunswick (Kennedy) | 0 | 0 | 0 | 1 | 0 | 0 | X | X | 1 |
| Saskatchewan (Korte) | 1 | 2 | 2 | 0 | 2 | 1 | X | X | 8 |

| Sheet 7 | 1 | 2 | 3 | 4 | 5 | 6 | 7 | 8 | Final |
| Manitoba (Boehmer) | 0 | 2 | 1 | 0 | 0 | 4 | 1 | X | 8 |
| British Columbia (Craig) | 1 | 0 | 0 | 1 | 0 | 0 | 0 | X | 2 |

| Sheet 8 | 1 | 2 | 3 | 4 | 5 | 6 | 7 | 8 | Final |
| Quebec (Roberge) | 1 | 0 | 0 | 3 | 0 | 2 | 2 | X | 8 |
| Prince Edward Island (Gorveatt) | 0 | 1 | 1 | 0 | 1 | 0 | 0 | X | 3 |

===== Draw 15 =====
Thursday, December 7, 8:30 pm

| Sheet 1 | 1 | 2 | 3 | 4 | 5 | 6 | 7 | 8 | Final |
| Prince Edward Island (Gorveatt) | 0 | 0 | 0 | 0 | 2 | 0 | 1 | 0 | 3 |
| Nova Scotia (Flemming) | 0 | 2 | 1 | 0 | 0 | 1 | 0 | 1 | 5 |

| Sheet 2 | 1 | 2 | 3 | 4 | 5 | 6 | 7 | 8 | Final |
| Newfoundland and Labrador (Smith) | 0 | 1 | 0 | 1 | 0 | 0 | 0 | X | 2 |
| New Brunswick (Kennedy) | 0 | 0 | 1 | 0 | 0 | 2 | 2 | X | 5 |

| Sheet 3 | 1 | 2 | 3 | 4 | 5 | 6 | 7 | 8 | Final |
| Saskatchewan (Korte) | 4 | 1 | 0 | 0 | 0 | 0 | 0 | X | 5 |
| Manitoba (Boehmer) | 0 | 0 | 2 | 1 | 0 | 2 | 2 | X | 7 |

| Sheet 4 | 1 | 2 | 3 | 4 | 5 | 6 | 7 | 8 | Final |
| British Columbia (Craig) | 4 | 2 | 1 | 3 | 0 | 0 | X | X | 10 |
| Quebec (Roberge) | 0 | 0 | 0 | 0 | 1 | 0 | X | X | 1 |

===== Draw 16 =====
Friday, December 8, 10:00 am

| Sheet 5 | 1 | 2 | 3 | 4 | 5 | 6 | 7 | 8 | Final |
| New Brunswick (Kennedy) | 1 | 0 | 0 | 2 | 2 | 0 | 2 | X | 7 |
| Prince Edward Island (Gorveatt) | 0 | 1 | 1 | 0 | 0 | 1 | 0 | X | 3 |

| Sheet 6 | 1 | 2 | 3 | 4 | 5 | 6 | 7 | 8 | Final |
| Nova Scotia (Flemming) | 0 | 0 | 0 | 2 | 0 | 0 | 0 | X | 2 |
| British Columbia (Craig) | 1 | 0 | 1 | 0 | 1 | 1 | 5 | X | 9 |

| Sheet 7 | 1 | 2 | 3 | 4 | 5 | 6 | 7 | 8 | Final |
| Quebec (Roberge) | 0 | 0 | 0 | 1 | 0 | 2 | 0 | X | 3 |
| Saskatchewan (Korte) | 2 | 0 | 1 | 0 | 3 | 0 | 2 | X | 8 |

| Sheet 8 | 1 | 2 | 3 | 4 | 5 | 6 | 7 | 8 | Final |
| Manitoba (Boehmer) | 1 | 0 | 1 | 0 | 2 | 0 | 2 | 0 | 6 |
| Newfoundland and Labrador (Smith) | 0 | 2 | 0 | 1 | 0 | 1 | 0 | 1 | 5 |

===== Draw 18 =====
Friday, December 8, 6:00 pm

| Sheet 1 | 1 | 2 | 3 | 4 | 5 | 6 | 7 | 8 | 9 | Final |
| Newfoundland and Labrador (Smith) | 0 | 2 | 0 | 1 | 0 | 0 | 0 | 1 | 3 | 7 |
| Quebec (Roberge) | 0 | 0 | 2 | 0 | 0 | 2 | 0 | 0 | 0 | 4 |

| Sheet 2 | 1 | 2 | 3 | 4 | 5 | 6 | 7 | 8 | 9 | Final |
| Prince Edward Island (Gorveatt) | 0 | 2 | 1 | 0 | 0 | 0 | 1 | 0 | 0 | 4 |
| Manitoba (Boehmer) | 1 | 0 | 0 | 0 | 1 | 1 | 0 | 1 | 1 | 5 |

| Sheet 3 | 1 | 2 | 3 | 4 | 5 | 6 | 7 | 8 | Final |
| British Columbia (Craig) | 0 | 2 | 0 | 0 | 1 | 1 | 3 | 0 | 7 |
| New Brunswick (Kennedy) | 1 | 0 | 1 | 4 | 0 | 0 | 0 | 2 | 8 |

| Sheet 4 | 1 | 2 | 3 | 4 | 5 | 6 | 7 | 8 | Final |
| Saskatchewan (Korte) | 0 | 1 | 1 | 1 | 1 | 0 | 0 | X | 4 |
| Nova Scotia (Flemming) | 4 | 0 | 0 | 0 | 0 | 3 | 1 | X | 8 |

=== Playoffs ===
Semifinals
1 | Nova Scotia | 9
4 | New Brunswick | 5
2 | Manitoba | 1
3 | Saskatchewan | 7

Final
1 | Nova Scotia | 4
3 | Saskatchewan | 3
Bronze medal game
4 | New Brunswick | 5
2 | Manitoba | 8

==== Semifinals ====
Saturday, December 9, 8:30 am

| Sheet 2 | 1 | 2 | 3 | 4 | 5 | 6 | 7 | 8 | Final |
| Nova Scotia (Flemming) | 3 | 0 | 2 | 0 | 0 | 2 | 2 | X | 9 |
| New Brunswick (Kennedy) | 0 | 2 | 0 | 2 | 1 | 0 | 0 | X | 5 |

| Sheet 3 | 1 | 2 | 3 | 4 | 5 | 6 | 7 | 8 | Final |
| Manitoba (Boehmer) | 0 | 0 | 0 | 0 | 0 | 1 | X | X | 1 |
| Saskatchewan (Korte) | 2 | 0 | 2 | 2 | 1 | 0 | X | X | 7 |

==== Bronze medal game ====
Saturday, December 9, 12:30 pm

| Sheet 5 | 1 | 2 | 3 | 4 | 5 | 6 | 7 | 8 | Final |
| New Brunswick (Kennedy) | 1 | 0 | 2 | 0 | 2 | 0 | 0 | 0 | 5 |
| Manitoba (Boehmer) | 0 | 2 | 0 | 1 | 0 | 3 | 1 | 1 | 8 |

==== Gold medal game ====
Saturday, December 9, 12:30 pm

| Sheet 4 | 1 | 2 | 3 | 4 | 5 | 6 | 7 | 8 | Final |
| Nova Scotia (Flemming) | 2 | 0 | 0 | 0 | 1 | 0 | 0 | 1 | 4 |
| Saskatchewan (Korte) | 0 | 0 | 0 | 0 | 0 | 2 | 1 | 0 | 3 |

== Women ==
=== Teams ===
The teams are listed as follows:

| Team | Skip | Third | Second | Lead | Alternate | Club |
|---|---|---|---|---|---|---|
| Alberta | Atina Ford-Johnston | Shannon Morris | Sheri Pickering | Cori Morris | | Okotoks CC, Okotoks; Irricana CC, Irricana; Calgary CC, Calgary |
| British Columbia | Diane Gushulak | Grace MacInnes | Danielle Shaughnessy | Cory Atchison | Allison MacInnes | Royal City CC, New Westminster |
| Manitoba | Joelle Brown | Maureen Bonar | Allyson Bell | Natalie Harding | Deb McCreanor | Charleswood CC, Winnipeg |
| New Brunswick | Shelly Graham | Sharon Levesque | Robyn Witherell | Shelley Murray | Debbie McCann | Capital WC, Fredericton |
| Newfoundland and Labrador | Pam Osborne | Jeannette Piper | Susan Foley | Janet Bartlett | | St. John's CC, St. John's |
| Northern Ontario | Stacey Szajewski | Hayley Smith | Donna Queen | Sue Cain | | Keewatin CC, Kenora |
| Northwest Territories | Sharon Cormier | Cheryl Tordoff | Marta Moir | Kelly Kaylo | Wendy Ondrack | Yellowknife CC, Yellowknife |
| Nova Scotia | Andrea Saulnier | Jill Alcoe-Holland | Jocelyn Nix | Kim Garby | | Glooscap CC, Kentville |
| Nunavut | Geneva Chislett | Denise Hutchings | Robyn Mackey | Lisa Kirk | | Iqaluit CC, Iqaluit |
| Ontario | Susan Froud | Kerry Lackie | Kristin Turcotte | Julie McMullin | | Alliston CC, Alliston |
| Prince Edward Island | Shelly Bradley | Susan McInnis | Julie Scales | Tricia MacGregor | Kim Dolan | Cornwall CC, Cornwall |
| Quebec | Chantal Osborne | Josée Friolet | Marie-Josée Précourt | Sylvie Daniel | Joëlle Sabourin | CC Thurso, Thurso; CC Laval-sur-le-Lac, Laval; CC Roberval, Roberval |
| Saskatchewan | Nancy Martin | Deanna Doig | Nancy Inglis | Cathy Inglis | | Martensville CC, Martensville |
| Yukon | Lorna Spenner | Laini Klassen | Laura Wilson | Laura Williamson | | Whitehorse CC, Whitehorse |

=== Round robin standings ===
Final Round Robin Standings

Key
| Teams to Championship Round |

| Pool A | Skip | W | L |
|---|---|---|---|
| Saskatchewan | Nancy Martin | 6 | 0 |
| British Columbia | Diane Gushulak | 5 | 1 |
| Alberta | Atina Ford-Johnston | 4 | 2 |
| Northwest Territories | Sharon Cormier | 3 | 3 |
| New Brunswick | Shelly Graham | 1 | 5 |
| Newfoundland and Labrador | Pam Osborne | 1 | 5 |
| Northern Ontario | Stacey Szajewski | 1 | 5 |

| Pool B | Skip | W | L |
|---|---|---|---|
| Ontario | Susan Froud | 5 | 1 |
| Quebec | Chantal Osborne | 5 | 1 |
| Nova Scotia | Andrea Saulnier | 4 | 2 |
| Manitoba | Joelle Brown | 3 | 3 |
| Prince Edward Island | Shelly Bradley | 3 | 3 |
| Nunavut | Geneva Chislett | 1 | 5 |
| Yukon | Lorna Spenner | 0 | 6 |

=== Round robin results ===
All draws are listed in Pacific Time (UTC−08:00).

==== Draw 1 ====
Sunday, December 3, 4:00 pm

| Sheet 1 | 1 | 2 | 3 | 4 | 5 | 6 | 7 | 8 | Final |
| New Brunswick (Graham) | 0 | 1 | 0 | 3 | 1 | 1 | 0 | 0 | 6 |
| Northern Ontario (Szajewski) | 1 | 0 | 2 | 0 | 0 | 0 | 3 | 3 | 9 |

| Sheet 2 | 1 | 2 | 3 | 4 | 5 | 6 | 7 | 8 | Final |
| Nunavut (Chislett) | 0 | 0 | 0 | 0 | 1 | 3 | 0 | 4 | 8 |
| Yukon (Spenner) | 1 | 1 | 2 | 1 | 0 | 0 | 2 | 0 | 7 |

| Sheet 5 | 1 | 2 | 3 | 4 | 5 | 6 | 7 | 8 | Final |
| Manitoba (Brown) | 0 | 1 | 0 | 1 | 0 | 1 | 0 | X | 3 |
| Nova Scotia (Saulnier) | 2 | 0 | 1 | 0 | 1 | 0 | 2 | X | 6 |

| Sheet 7 | 1 | 2 | 3 | 4 | 5 | 6 | 7 | 8 | Final |
| Newfoundland and Labrador (P. Osborne) | 0 | 0 | 0 | 0 | 1 | 1 | X | X | 2 |
| Saskatchewan (Martin) | 4 | 3 | 2 | 4 | 0 | 0 | X | X | 13 |

==== Draw 2 ====
Sunday, December 3, 8:00 pm

| Sheet 4 | 1 | 2 | 3 | 4 | 5 | 6 | 7 | 8 | Final |
| Northwest Territories (Cormier) | 0 | 0 | 0 | 0 | 1 | 0 | X | X | 1 |
| Alberta (Ford-Johnston) | 0 | 2 | 1 | 1 | 0 | 5 | X | X | 9 |

| Sheet 6 | 1 | 2 | 3 | 4 | 5 | 6 | 7 | 8 | 9 | Final |
| Prince Edward Island (Bradley) | 1 | 0 | 1 | 0 | 0 | 1 | 0 | 1 | 2 | 6 |
| Ontario (Froud) | 0 | 1 | 0 | 2 | 0 | 0 | 1 | 0 | 0 | 4 |

==== Draw 3 ====
Monday, December 4, 10:00 am

| Sheet 3 | 1 | 2 | 3 | 4 | 5 | 6 | 7 | 8 | Final |
| Saskatchewan (Martin) | 0 | 3 | 1 | 1 | 0 | 0 | 4 | X | 9 |
| British Columbia (Gushulak) | 1 | 0 | 0 | 0 | 1 | 1 | 0 | X | 3 |

| Sheet 4 | 1 | 2 | 3 | 4 | 5 | 6 | 7 | 8 | Final |
| Nova Scotia (Saulnier) | 1 | 0 | 2 | 0 | 0 | 1 | 0 | 0 | 4 |
| Quebec (C. Osborne) | 0 | 1 | 0 | 1 | 2 | 0 | 0 | 1 | 5 |

| Sheet 6 | 1 | 2 | 3 | 4 | 5 | 6 | 7 | 8 | Final |
| Alberta (Ford-Johnston) | 0 | 1 | 0 | 3 | 0 | 2 | 0 | 0 | 6 |
| New Brunswick (Graham) | 1 | 0 | 2 | 0 | 1 | 0 | 1 | 0 | 5 |

| Sheet 7 | 1 | 2 | 3 | 4 | 5 | 6 | 7 | 8 | Final |
| Ontario (Froud) | 2 | 0 | 3 | 0 | 0 | 2 | 0 | X | 7 |
| Nunavut (Chislett) | 0 | 1 | 0 | 1 | 0 | 0 | 1 | X | 3 |

==== Draw 4 ====
Monday, December 4, 2:00 pm

| Sheet 3 | 1 | 2 | 3 | 4 | 5 | 6 | 7 | 8 | Final |
| Newfoundland and Labrador (P. Osborne) | 1 | 0 | 0 | 0 | 2 | 0 | 0 | X | 3 |
| Northwest Territories (Cormier) | 0 | 1 | 1 | 2 | 0 | 1 | 2 | X | 7 |

| Sheet 4 | 1 | 2 | 3 | 4 | 5 | 6 | 7 | 8 | Final |
| Manitoba (Brown) | 0 | 2 | 0 | 2 | 0 | 1 | 0 | 1 | 6 |
| Prince Edward Island (Bradley) | 1 | 0 | 0 | 0 | 0 | 0 | 4 | 0 | 5 |

| Sheet 7 | 1 | 2 | 3 | 4 | 5 | 6 | 7 | 8 | Final |
| Quebec (C. Osborne) | 0 | 3 | 0 | 0 | 4 | 0 | 2 | X | 9 |
| Yukon (Spenner) | 0 | 0 | 2 | 2 | 0 | 1 | 0 | X | 5 |

| Sheet 8 | 1 | 2 | 3 | 4 | 5 | 6 | 7 | 8 | Final |
| British Columbia (Gushulak) | 2 | 0 | 2 | 0 | 1 | 3 | 0 | X | 8 |
| Northern Ontario (Szajewski) | 0 | 2 | 0 | 1 | 0 | 0 | 1 | X | 4 |

==== Draw 5 ====
Monday, December 4, 6:00 pm

| Sheet 1 | 1 | 2 | 3 | 4 | 5 | 6 | 7 | 8 | Final |
| Alberta (Ford-Johnston) | 6 | 1 | 0 | 0 | 1 | 3 | X | X | 11 |
| Newfoundland and Labrador (P. Osborne) | 0 | 0 | 2 | 1 | 0 | 0 | X | X | 3 |

| Sheet 2 | 1 | 2 | 3 | 4 | 5 | 6 | 7 | 8 | Final |
| Ontario (Froud) | 2 | 0 | 0 | 0 | 2 | 0 | 1 | 1 | 6 |
| Manitoba (Brown) | 0 | 0 | 1 | 1 | 0 | 1 | 0 | 0 | 3 |

| Sheet 5 | 1 | 2 | 3 | 4 | 5 | 6 | 7 | 8 | Final |
| Saskatchewan (Martin) | 0 | 2 | 0 | 2 | 0 | 1 | 1 | X | 6 |
| New Brunswick (Graham) | 1 | 0 | 1 | 0 | 2 | 0 | 0 | X | 4 |

| Sheet 6 | 1 | 2 | 3 | 4 | 5 | 6 | 7 | 8 | Final |
| Nova Scotia (Saulnier) | 3 | 0 | 2 | 1 | 0 | 2 | X | X | 8 |
| Nunavut (Chislett) | 0 | 1 | 0 | 0 | 1 | 0 | X | X | 2 |

==== Draw 6 ====
Tuesday, December 5, 10:00 am

| Sheet 2 | 1 | 2 | 3 | 4 | 5 | 6 | 7 | 8 | 9 | Final |
| British Columbia (Gushulak) | 0 | 2 | 0 | 1 | 0 | 2 | 1 | 0 | 2 | 8 |
| Alberta (Ford-Johnston) | 3 | 0 | 1 | 0 | 1 | 0 | 0 | 1 | 0 | 6 |

| Sheet 3 | 1 | 2 | 3 | 4 | 5 | 6 | 7 | 8 | 9 | Final |
| Quebec (C. Osborne) | 0 | 2 | 0 | 3 | 0 | 1 | 0 | 2 | 0 | 8 |
| Ontario (Froud) | 1 | 0 | 3 | 0 | 2 | 0 | 2 | 0 | 1 | 9 |

| Sheet 5 | 1 | 2 | 3 | 4 | 5 | 6 | 7 | 8 | Final |
| Nunavut (Chislett) | 2 | 0 | 0 | 2 | 0 | 1 | 0 | X | 5 |
| Prince Edward Island (Bradley) | 0 | 5 | 2 | 0 | 1 | 0 | 1 | X | 9 |

| Sheet 8 | 1 | 2 | 3 | 4 | 5 | 6 | 7 | 8 | Final |
| New Brunswick (Graham) | 0 | 0 | 3 | 1 | 0 | 0 | 0 | X | 4 |
| Northwest Territories (Cormier) | 2 | 6 | 0 | 0 | 1 | 1 | 1 | X | 11 |

==== Draw 7 ====
Tuesday, December 5, 2:00 pm

| Sheet 4 | 1 | 2 | 3 | 4 | 5 | 6 | 7 | 8 | Final |
| Alberta (Ford-Johnston) | 4 | 0 | 3 | 4 | 0 | 1 | X | X | 12 |
| Northern Ontario (Szajewski) | 0 | 2 | 0 | 0 | 1 | 0 | X | X | 3 |

| Sheet 6 | 1 | 2 | 3 | 4 | 5 | 6 | 7 | 8 | Final |
| Yukon (Spenner) | 0 | 0 | 0 | 0 | 0 | 3 | X | X | 3 |
| Nova Scotia (Saulnier) | 1 | 3 | 2 | 1 | 2 | 0 | X | X | 9 |

| Sheet 7 | 1 | 2 | 3 | 4 | 5 | 6 | 7 | 8 | Final |
| Northwest Territories (Cormier) | 1 | 0 | 0 | 0 | 0 | 2 | 0 | X | 3 |
| British Columbia (Gushulak) | 0 | 1 | 1 | 2 | 1 | 0 | 1 | X | 6 |

| Sheet 8 | 1 | 2 | 3 | 4 | 5 | 6 | 7 | 8 | Final |
| Prince Edward Island (Bradley) | 0 | 0 | 0 | 1 | 0 | 0 | X | X | 1 |
| Quebec (C. Osborne) | 0 | 2 | 1 | 0 | 2 | 2 | X | X | 7 |

==== Draw 8 ====
Tuesday, December 5, 6:00 pm

| Sheet 2 | 1 | 2 | 3 | 4 | 5 | 6 | 7 | 8 | 9 | Final |
| Newfoundland and Labrador (P. Osborne) | 0 | 0 | 2 | 0 | 2 | 0 | 0 | 1 | 0 | 5 |
| New Brunswick (Graham) | 2 | 1 | 0 | 1 | 0 | 0 | 1 | 0 | 1 | 6 |

| Sheet 3 | 1 | 2 | 3 | 4 | 5 | 6 | 7 | 8 | Final |
| Manitoba (Brown) | 1 | 0 | 1 | 1 | 0 | 2 | 1 | X | 6 |
| Nunavut (Chislett) | 0 | 1 | 0 | 0 | 2 | 0 | 0 | X | 3 |

| Sheet 5 | 1 | 2 | 3 | 4 | 5 | 6 | 7 | 8 | Final |
| Ontario (Froud) | 1 | 3 | 1 | 0 | 1 | 2 | X | X | 8 |
| Yukon (Spenner) | 0 | 0 | 0 | 1 | 0 | 0 | X | X | 1 |

| Sheet 7 | 1 | 2 | 3 | 4 | 5 | 6 | 7 | 8 | Final |
| Northern Ontario (Szajewski) | 0 | 0 | 0 | 1 | 0 | 2 | 0 | X | 3 |
| Saskatchewan (Martin) | 0 | 3 | 0 | 0 | 1 | 0 | 2 | X | 6 |

==== Draw 9 ====
Wednesday, December 6, 10:00 am

| Sheet 1 | 1 | 2 | 3 | 4 | 5 | 6 | 7 | 8 | Final |
| Northwest Territories (Cormier) | 0 | 0 | 0 | 0 | 0 | 0 | X | X | 0 |
| Saskatchewan (Martin) | 1 | 1 | 1 | 1 | 2 | 4 | X | X | 10 |

| Sheet 2 | 1 | 2 | 3 | 4 | 5 | 6 | 7 | 8 | Final |
| Prince Edward Island (Bradley) | 1 | 0 | 0 | 1 | 0 | 0 | 0 | X | 2 |
| Nova Scotia (Saulnier) | 0 | 1 | 0 | 0 | 1 | 2 | 1 | X | 5 |

| Sheet 6 | 1 | 2 | 3 | 4 | 5 | 6 | 7 | 8 | Final |
| Northern Ontario (Szajewski) | 0 | 1 | 1 | 0 | 0 | 0 | X | X | 1 |
| Newfoundland and Labrador (P. Osborne) | 5 | 0 | 0 | 1 | 2 | 4 | X | X | 12 |

| Sheet 8 | 1 | 2 | 3 | 4 | 5 | 6 | 7 | 8 | Final |
| Yukon (Spenner) | 0 | 0 | 1 | 0 | 0 | 0 | X | X | 1 |
| Manitoba (Brown) | 1 | 1 | 0 | 2 | 1 | 4 | X | X | 9 |

==== Draw 10 ====
Wednesday, December 6, 2:00 pm

| Sheet 1 | 1 | 2 | 3 | 4 | 5 | 6 | 7 | 8 | Final |
| Nunavut (Chislett) | 0 | 1 | 0 | 1 | 0 | 0 | X | X | 2 |
| Quebec (C. Osborne) | 4 | 0 | 3 | 0 | 3 | 3 | X | X | 13 |

| Sheet 4 | 1 | 2 | 3 | 4 | 5 | 6 | 7 | 8 | Final |
| New Brunswick (Graham) | 1 | 0 | 0 | 0 | 1 | 0 | X | X | 2 |
| British Columbia (Gushulak) | 0 | 1 | 1 | 3 | 0 | 4 | X | X | 9 |

| Sheet 7 | 1 | 2 | 3 | 4 | 5 | 6 | 7 | 8 | 9 | Final |
| Saskatchewan (Martin) | 0 | 0 | 0 | 3 | 1 | 0 | 1 | 0 | 1 | 6 |
| Alberta (Ford-Johnston) | 0 | 2 | 0 | 0 | 0 | 2 | 0 | 1 | 0 | 5 |

| Sheet 8 | 1 | 2 | 3 | 4 | 5 | 6 | 7 | 8 | Final |
| Nova Scotia (Saulnier) | 0 | 1 | 0 | 0 | 0 | 1 | X | X | 2 |
| Ontario (Froud) | 4 | 0 | 0 | 2 | 3 | 0 | X | X | 9 |

==== Draw 11 ====
Wednesday, December 6, 6:00 pm

| Sheet 1 | 1 | 2 | 3 | 4 | 5 | 6 | 7 | 8 | Final |
| Yukon (Spenner) | 0 | 2 | 0 | 0 | 0 | 3 | 1 | 0 | 6 |
| Prince Edward Island (Bradley) | 2 | 0 | 1 | 1 | 2 | 0 | 0 | 1 | 7 |

| Sheet 2 | 1 | 2 | 3 | 4 | 5 | 6 | 7 | 8 | Final |
| Northern Ontario (Szajewski) | 0 | 2 | 0 | 0 | 0 | 0 | 1 | X | 3 |
| Northwest Territories (Cormier) | 1 | 0 | 0 | 1 | 3 | 1 | 0 | X | 6 |

| Sheet 5 | 1 | 2 | 3 | 4 | 5 | 6 | 7 | 8 | Final |
| British Columbia (Gushulak) | 2 | 0 | 1 | 1 | 1 | 1 | 0 | X | 6 |
| Newfoundland and Labrador (P. Osborne) | 0 | 1 | 0 | 0 | 0 | 0 | 1 | X | 2 |

| Sheet 6 | 1 | 2 | 3 | 4 | 5 | 6 | 7 | 8 | Final |
| Quebec (C. Osborne) | 0 | 4 | 2 | 0 | 0 | 0 | 2 | X | 8 |
| Manitoba (Brown) | 0 | 0 | 0 | 1 | 1 | 1 | 0 | X | 3 |

=== Seeding pool ===
==== Standings ====
Final Seeding Pool Standings

| Team | Skip | W | L |
|---|---|---|---|
| Prince Edward Island | Shelly Bradley | 6 | 3 |
| Northern Ontario | Stacey Szajewski | 2 | 7 |
| New Brunswick | Shelly Graham | 2 | 7 |
| Newfoundland and Labrador | Pam Osborne | 2 | 7 |
| Yukon | Lorna Spenner | 2 | 7 |
| Nunavut | Geneva Chislett | 2 | 7 |

==== Results ====
===== Draw 12 =====
Thursday, December 7, 8:30 am

| Sheet 1 | 1 | 2 | 3 | 4 | 5 | 6 | 7 | 8 | Final |
| Nunavut (Chislett) | 1 | 0 | 0 | 0 | 0 | 0 | X | X | 1 |
| Newfoundland and Labrador (P. Osborne) | 0 | 3 | 3 | 2 | 1 | 1 | X | X | 10 |

| Sheet 3 | 1 | 2 | 3 | 4 | 5 | 6 | 7 | 8 | Final |
| New Brunswick (Graham) | 0 | 0 | 0 | 0 | 0 | 1 | X | X | 1 |
| Yukon (Spenner) | 1 | 2 | 2 | 1 | 1 | 0 | X | X | 7 |

| Sheet 5 | 1 | 2 | 3 | 4 | 5 | 6 | 7 | 8 | Final |
| Prince Edward Island (Bradley) | 3 | 1 | 2 | 0 | 3 | 0 | X | X | 9 |
| Northern Ontario (Szajewski) | 0 | 0 | 0 | 1 | 0 | 1 | X | X | 2 |

===== Draw 14 =====
Thursday, December 7, 4:30 pm

| Sheet 1 | 1 | 2 | 3 | 4 | 5 | 6 | 7 | 8 | Final |
| Yukon (Spenner) | 0 | 0 | 1 | 0 | 1 | 1 | 2 | 0 | 5 |
| Northern Ontario (Szajewski) | 2 | 1 | 0 | 2 | 0 | 0 | 0 | 2 | 7 |

| Sheet 3 | 1 | 2 | 3 | 4 | 5 | 6 | 7 | 8 | 9 | Final |
| Newfoundland and Labrador (P. Osborne) | 1 | 0 | 2 | 1 | 3 | 0 | 0 | 0 | 0 | 7 |
| Prince Edward Island (Bradley) | 0 | 2 | 0 | 0 | 0 | 1 | 3 | 1 | 2 | 9 |

| Sheet 5 | 1 | 2 | 3 | 4 | 5 | 6 | 7 | 8 | Final |
| Nunavut (Chislett) | 0 | 0 | 0 | 3 | 1 | 0 | 0 | X | 4 |
| New Brunswick (Graham) | 1 | 2 | 3 | 0 | 0 | 1 | 5 | X | 12 |

===== Draw 17 =====
Friday, December 8, 2:00 pm

| Sheet 2 | 1 | 2 | 3 | 4 | 5 | 6 | 7 | 8 | Final |
| New Brunswick (Graham) | 0 | 0 | 0 | 0 | 2 | 0 | X | X | 2 |
| Prince Edward Island (Bradley) | 4 | 1 | 3 | 2 | 0 | 3 | X | X | 13 |

| Sheet 4 | 1 | 2 | 3 | 4 | 5 | 6 | 7 | 8 | Final |
| Northern Ontario (Szajewski) | 0 | 1 | 0 | 1 | 0 | 4 | 0 | 0 | 6 |
| Nunavut (Chislett) | 1 | 0 | 1 | 0 | 1 | 0 | 3 | 1 | 7 |

| Sheet 6 | 1 | 2 | 3 | 4 | 5 | 6 | 7 | 8 | 9 | Final |
| Newfoundland and Labrador (P. Osborne) | 0 | 1 | 1 | 0 | 0 | 2 | 1 | 0 | 0 | 5 |
| Yukon (Spenner) | 1 | 0 | 0 | 1 | 2 | 0 | 0 | 1 | 1 | 6 |

=== Championship pool ===
==== Standings ====
Final Championship Pool Standings

Key
| Teams to Playoffs |

| Team | Skip | W | L |
|---|---|---|---|
| Saskatchewan | Nancy Martin | 9 | 1 |
| Ontario | Susan Froud | 7 | 3 |
| Alberta | Atina Ford-Johnston | 7 | 3 |
| British Columbia | Diane Gushulak | 7 | 3 |
| Northwest Territories | Sharon Cormier | 6 | 4 |
| Quebec | Chantal Osborne | 5 | 5 |
| Nova Scotia | Andrea Saulnier | 5 | 5 |
| Manitoba | Joelle Brown | 5 | 5 |

==== Results ====
===== Draw 13 =====
Thursday, December 7, 12:30 pm

| Sheet 1 | 1 | 2 | 3 | 4 | 5 | 6 | 7 | 8 | Final |
| Saskatchewan (Martin) | 0 | 0 | 2 | 0 | 0 | 0 | X | X | 2 |
| Manitoba (Brown) | 3 | 2 | 0 | 3 | 1 | 2 | X | X | 11 |

| Sheet 2 | 1 | 2 | 3 | 4 | 5 | 6 | 7 | 8 | Final |
| British Columbia (Gushulak) | 0 | 0 | 2 | 0 | 0 | 2 | 0 | 0 | 4 |
| Ontario (Froud) | 0 | 3 | 0 | 0 | 1 | 0 | 0 | 1 | 5 |

| Sheet 3 | 1 | 2 | 3 | 4 | 5 | 6 | 7 | 8 | Final |
| Alberta (Ford-Johnston) | 1 | 1 | 0 | 3 | 3 | 0 | 3 | X | 11 |
| Quebec (C. Osborne) | 0 | 0 | 1 | 0 | 0 | 3 | 0 | X | 4 |

| Sheet 4 | 1 | 2 | 3 | 4 | 5 | 6 | 7 | 8 | Final |
| Northwest Territories (Cormier) | 1 | 0 | 0 | 1 | 0 | 0 | 3 | 1 | 6 |
| Nova Scotia (Saulnier) | 0 | 1 | 0 | 0 | 2 | 1 | 0 | 0 | 4 |

===== Draw 15 =====
Thursday, December 7, 8:30 pm

| Sheet 5 | 1 | 2 | 3 | 4 | 5 | 6 | 7 | 8 | Final |
| Nova Scotia (Saulnier) | 1 | 0 | 1 | 0 | 0 | 1 | 1 | 0 | 4 |
| Saskatchewan (Martin) | 0 | 2 | 0 | 3 | 0 | 0 | 0 | 1 | 6 |

| Sheet 6 | 1 | 2 | 3 | 4 | 5 | 6 | 7 | 8 | Final |
| Manitoba (Brown) | 0 | 1 | 3 | 0 | 0 | 0 | 0 | X | 4 |
| British Columbia (Gushulak) | 1 | 0 | 0 | 1 | 2 | 1 | 1 | X | 6 |

| Sheet 7 | 1 | 2 | 3 | 4 | 5 | 6 | 7 | 8 | 9 | Final |
| Ontario (Froud) | 1 | 0 | 0 | 0 | 0 | 1 | 1 | 0 | 0 | 3 |
| Alberta (Ford-Johnston) | 0 | 0 | 1 | 1 | 0 | 0 | 0 | 1 | 1 | 4 |

| Sheet 8 | 1 | 2 | 3 | 4 | 5 | 6 | 7 | 8 | Final |
| Quebec (C. Osborne) | 0 | 0 | 1 | 0 | 1 | 1 | 0 | X | 3 |
| Northwest Territories (Cormier) | 1 | 2 | 0 | 1 | 0 | 0 | 3 | X | 7 |

===== Draw 16 =====
Friday, December 8, 10:00 am

| Sheet 1 | 1 | 2 | 3 | 4 | 5 | 6 | 7 | 8 | Final |
| British Columbia (Gushulak) | 0 | 2 | 0 | 0 | 3 | 0 | 0 | 0 | 5 |
| Nova Scotia (Saulnier) | 1 | 0 | 0 | 1 | 0 | 2 | 1 | 3 | 8 |

| Sheet 2 | 1 | 2 | 3 | 4 | 5 | 6 | 7 | 8 | Final |
| Saskatchewan (Martin) | 1 | 0 | 1 | 0 | 3 | 1 | 0 | X | 6 |
| Quebec (C. Osborne) | 0 | 0 | 0 | 1 | 0 | 0 | 2 | X | 3 |

| Sheet 3 | 1 | 2 | 3 | 4 | 5 | 6 | 7 | 8 | Final |
| Northwest Territories (Cormier) | 1 | 0 | 1 | 0 | 0 | 1 | 0 | X | 3 |
| Ontario (Froud) | 0 | 2 | 0 | 2 | 1 | 0 | 3 | X | 8 |

| Sheet 4 | 1 | 2 | 3 | 4 | 5 | 6 | 7 | 8 | Final |
| Alberta (Ford-Johnston) | 0 | 0 | 1 | 0 | 1 | 0 | 0 | 2 | 4 |
| Manitoba (Brown) | 0 | 1 | 0 | 1 | 0 | 2 | 2 | 0 | 6 |

===== Draw 18 =====
Friday, December 8, 6:00 pm

| Sheet 5 | 1 | 2 | 3 | 4 | 5 | 6 | 7 | 8 | Final |
| Manitoba (Brown) | 1 | 0 | 1 | 0 | 2 | 0 | 1 | 0 | 5 |
| Northwest Territories (Cormier) | 0 | 2 | 0 | 3 | 0 | 1 | 0 | 2 | 8 |

| Sheet 6 | 1 | 2 | 3 | 4 | 5 | 6 | 7 | 8 | Final |
| Nova Scotia (Saulnier) | 0 | 1 | 0 | 2 | 0 | 1 | 0 | 0 | 4 |
| Alberta (Ford-Johnston) | 0 | 0 | 1 | 0 | 1 | 0 | 3 | 1 | 6 |

| Sheet 7 | 1 | 2 | 3 | 4 | 5 | 6 | 7 | 8 | Final |
| Quebec (C. Osborne) | 0 | 2 | 0 | 0 | 1 | 1 | 0 | X | 4 |
| British Columbia (Gushulak) | 1 | 0 | 1 | 1 | 0 | 0 | 3 | X | 6 |

| Sheet 8 | 1 | 2 | 3 | 4 | 5 | 6 | 7 | 8 | Final |
| Ontario (Froud) | 1 | 0 | 2 | 1 | 0 | 0 | 0 | X | 4 |
| Saskatchewan (Martin) | 0 | 1 | 0 | 0 | 3 | 2 | 2 | X | 8 |

=== Playoffs ===
Semifinals
1 | Saskatchewan | 7
4 | British Columbia | 2
2 | Ontario | 5
3 | Alberta | 3

Final
1 | Saskatchewan | 4
2 | Ontario | 10
Bronze medal game
4 | British Columbia | 7
3 | Alberta | 3

==== Semifinals ====
Saturday, December 9, 8:30 am

| Sheet 4 | 1 | 2 | 3 | 4 | 5 | 6 | 7 | 8 | Final |
| Saskatchewan (Martin) | 0 | 1 | 1 | 0 | 4 | 1 | 0 | X | 7 |
| British Columbia (Gushulak) | 0 | 0 | 0 | 1 | 0 | 0 | 1 | X | 2 |

| Sheet 5 | 1 | 2 | 3 | 4 | 5 | 6 | 7 | 8 | Final |
| Ontario (Froud) | 1 | 0 | 0 | 2 | 0 | 0 | 1 | 1 | 5 |
| Alberta (Ford-Johnston) | 0 | 0 | 2 | 0 | 1 | 0 | 0 | 0 | 3 |

==== Bronze medal game ====
Saturday, December 9, 3:30 pm

| Sheet 5 | 1 | 2 | 3 | 4 | 5 | 6 | 7 | 8 | Final |
| British Columbia (Gushulak) | 2 | 1 | 0 | 1 | 0 | 0 | 3 | X | 7 |
| Alberta (Ford-Johnston) | 0 | 0 | 2 | 0 | 1 | 0 | 0 | X | 3 |

==== Gold medal game ====
Saturday, December 9, 3:30 pm

| Sheet 4 | 1 | 2 | 3 | 4 | 5 | 6 | 7 | 8 | Final |
| Saskatchewan (Martin) | 1 | 0 | 1 | 2 | 0 | 0 | 0 | X | 4 |
| Ontario (Froud) | 0 | 2 | 0 | 0 | 2 | 3 | 3 | X | 10 |
