= 2026 Northwest Territories Men's Curling Championship =

Canadian territorial men's curling championship

- Host city: Yellowknife, Northwest Territories
- Arena: Yellowknife Curling Centre
- Dates: January 22–25
- Winner: Team Koe
- Curling club: Yellowknife CC, Yellowknife
- Skip: Jamie Koe
- Third: Glen Kennedy
- Second: Roland Robinson
- Lead: Shadrach McLeod
- Finalist: Aaron Bartling

The 2026 Northwest Territories Men's Curling Championship, the men's territorial curling championship for the Northwest Territories, was held from January 22 to 25 at the Yellowknife Curling Centre in Yellowknife, Northwest Territories. The winning Jamie Koe rink represented the Northwest Territories at the 2026 Montana's Brier in St. John's, Newfoundland and Labrador.

== Teams ==
The teams are listed as follows:

Skip	Third	Second	Lead	Club
Aaron Bartling	D'arcy Delorey	Norman Bassett	Eric Preston	Hay River CC, Hay River
Jamie Koe	Glen Kennedy	Roland Robinson	Shadrach McLeod	Yellowknife CC, Yellowknife
Greg Skauge	Tom Naugler	Brad Chorostkowski	Brad Patzer	Yellowknife CC, Yellowknife
Cory Vanthuyne	Derek Elkin	Roshan Begg	Jeff Kincaid	Yellowknife CC, Yellowknife
Jasper Willkomm	Atticus Willkomm	Jett Etter	Clark Nendsa	Inuvik CC, Inuvik

== Round robin standings ==
Final Round Robin Standings

Key
Teams to Playoffs

Skip	W	L	W–L	PF	PA	EW	EL	BE	SE
Jamie Koe	4	0	–	40	16	18	10	1	8
Greg Skauge	3	1	–	34	20	16	17	3	4
Aaron Bartling	2	2	–	27	27	19	16	0	6
Cory Vanthuyne	1	3	–	27	32	15	15	0	3
Jasper Willkomm	0	4	–	13	46	9	19	0	0

== Round robin results ==
All draw times are listed in Mountain Standard Time (UTC−07:00).

=== Draw 1 ===
Thursday, January 22, 12:00 pm

Sheet B	1	2	3	4	5	6	7	8	9	10	Final
Jamie Koe 🔨	2	0	2	0	2	2	3	X	X	X	11
Jasper Willkomm	0	1	0	2	0	0	0	X	X	X	3

Sheet C	1	2	3	4	5	6	7	8	9	10	Final
Aaron Bartling	0	0	2	0	1	1	0	3	1	X	8
Cory Vanthuyne 🔨	1	2	0	1	0	0	1	0	0	X	5

=== Draw 2 ===
Thursday, January 22, 5:00 pm

Sheet B	1	2	3	4	5	6	7	8	9	10	Final
Cory Vanthuyne	0	3	2	0	3	0	5	X	X	X	13
Jasper Willkomm 🔨	1	0	0	2	0	1	0	X	X	X	4

Sheet C	1	2	3	4	5	6	7	8	9	10	11	Final
Aaron Bartling 🔨	1	1	0	0	1	0	1	2	0	1	0	7
Greg Skauge	0	0	2	1	0	2	0	0	2	0	2	9

=== Draw 3 ===
Friday, January 23, 10:00 am

Sheet B	1	2	3	4	5	6	7	8	9	10	Final
Jasper Willkomm	0	0	0	2	0	2	0	1	0	X	5
Aaron Bartling 🔨	3	1	1	0	2	0	1	0	1	X	9

Sheet C	1	2	3	4	5	6	7	8	9	10	Final
Jamie Koe	1	0	0	1	1	2	0	0	2	1	8
Greg Skauge 🔨	0	0	3	0	0	0	1	1	0	0	5

=== Draw 4 ===
Friday, January 23, 3:00 pm

Sheet B	1	2	3	4	5	6	7	8	9	10	Final
Jamie Koe 🔨	5	0	5	0	3	0	X	X	X	X	13
Cory Vanthuyne	0	1	0	1	0	3	X	X	X	X	5

Sheet C	1	2	3	4	5	6	7	8	9	10	Final
Greg Skauge 🔨	2	2	0	0	6	3	X	X	X	X	13
Jasper Willkomm	0	0	1	0	0	0	X	X	X	X	1

=== Draw 5 ===
Saturday, January 24, 11:00 am

Sheet B	1	2	3	4	5	6	7	8	9	10	Final
Cory Vanthuyne	0	1	1	0	0	1	0	1	0	X	4
Greg Skauge 🔨	1	0	0	0	2	0	2	0	2	X	7

Sheet C	1	2	3	4	5	6	7	8	9	10	Final
Aaron Bartling 🔨	0	0	2	0	1	0	0	X	X	X	3
Jamie Koe	1	3	0	2	0	0	2	X	X	X	8

== Playoffs ==
Page playoff system
1	Jamie Koe	10
2	Greg Skauge	6
3	Aaron Bartling	7
4	Cory Vanthuyne	0

Semifinal
2	Greg Skauge	5
3	Aaron Bartling	6

Final
1	Jamie Koe	9
3	Aaron Bartling	3

=== 1 vs. 2 ===
Saturday, January 24, 4:00 pm

Sheet B	1	2	3	4	5	6	7	8	9	10	Final
Jamie Koe 🔨	1	3	0	1	2	0	1	0	2	X	10
Greg Skauge	0	0	3	0	0	1	0	2	0	X	6

=== 3 vs. 4 ===
Saturday, January 24, 4:00 pm

Sheet C	1	2	3	4	5	6	7	8	9	10	Final
Aaron Bartling 🔨	1	1	1	1	1	2	X	X	X	X	7
Cory Vanthuyne	0	0	0	0	0	0	X	X	X	X	0

=== Semifinal ===
Sunday, January 25, 11:00 am

Sheet B	1	2	3	4	5	6	7	8	9	10	Final
Greg Skauge 🔨	2	0	2	0	0	0	0	0	1	0	5
Aaron Bartling	0	1	0	0	1	0	0	1	0	3	6

=== Final ===
Sunday, January 25, 4:00 pm

Sheet B	1	2	3	4	5	6	7	8	9	10	Final
Jamie Koe 🔨	2	2	0	2	0	3	X	X	X	X	9
Aaron Bartling	0	0	2	0	1	0	X	X	X	X	3

2026 Northwest Territories Men's Curling Championship
(Northwest Territories)
Jamie Koe
18th Territorial Championship title
