= Charles Dent (politician) =

Canadian politician

Charles Dent (born July 20, 1951 in Edmonton, Alberta) is a Canadian politician, is a former radio station manager, a volunteer fire fighter, a former municipal level politician and a long serving cabinet minister in the Northwest Territories territorial government.

== Early life ==
Son of Aileen and Ivor Dent. Ivor served as mayor of Edmonton 1968-1974 and the first president of the Alberta NDP, founded in 1962.

Dent graduated from the University of Alberta and moved to Yellowknife, Northwest Territories, in 1976. He founded a radio station after he arrived in Yellowknife, CJCD-FM Mix 100. He managed that station until he was elected as an MLA in 1991.

Dent began his political career on the Yellowknife city council. He held the position of alderman from 1984 to 1985 and became President of President of the NWT Association of Municipalities.

== Politics ==
Dent ran for a seat in the Northwest Territories legislature in the 1991 Northwest Territories general election. He was re-elected in the 1995 Northwest Territories general election with a comfortable margin. He ran for a third term in office in the 1999 Northwest Territories general election winning just under half of the popular vote. He ran for his fourth and final term in office in the 2003 Northwest Territories general election.

During his time in the Legislature he served numerous portfolios in the cabinet including. Government House Leader, Minister of Education, Culture and Employment, Minister of Human Resources, Minister Responsible for the Status of Women, Minister Responsible for Seniors, and Minister Responsible for Persons with Disabilities.

He did not run for a fifth term in 2007.

Legislative Assembly of the Northwest Territories
Preceded by New District	MLA Frame Lake; 1991-2007	Succeeded by Wendy Bisaro
