= Yellowknife North =

Territorial electoral district in the Northwest Territories, Canada

Northwest Territories electoral district
- Boundaries of Yellowknife North

Territorial electoral district
- Legislature: Legislative Assembly of the Northwest Territories
MLA
Shauna Morgan
- First contested: 1975
- Last contested: 2023

Demographics
- Census subdivision(s): Yellowknife

Yellowknife North is a territorial electoral district for the Legislative Assembly of the Northwest Territories, Canada. It is one of seven districts that represent Yellowknife, the territorial capital. It encompasses Old Town, Niven Heights, some of downtown, and a large rural hinterland centred on the Ingraham Trail.

The district previously existed from 1975 to 1999, but was dissolved at the 1999 election.

The riding was recreated for the 2015 election, from part of the former district of Weledeh.

== Members of the Legislative Assembly (MLAs) ==
Name	Elected	Left Office
Dave Nickerson	1975	1979
George Braden	1975	1983
Michael Ballantyne	1983	1995
Roy Erasmus	1995	1999
dissolved	1999	2015
Cory Vanthuyne	2015	2019
Rylund Johnson	2019	2023
Shauna Morgan	2023	present

== Election results ==
=== 2023 election ===
2023 Northwest Territories general election
Candidate	Votes	%
Shauna Morgan	734	64.50
Bruce Valpy	350	30.76
Jon Howe	54	4.75
Total votes	1138	

=== 2019 election ===
2019 Northwest Territories general election
Candidate	Votes
Rylund Johnson	501
Cory Vanthuyne	496
Jan Vallillee	380

=== 2015 election ===
2015 Northwest Territories general election
Candidate	Votes	%
Cory Vanthuyne	392	35.8
Dan Wong	376	34.3
Ben Nind	189	17.2
Edwin Castillo	127	11.6
Sean Erasmus	12	1.1
Total valid ballots / Turnout	1,096	45%

=== 1979 election ===
1979 Northwest Territories general election
Candidate	Votes	%
George Braden	306	43.59%
Bob Olexin	223	31.77%
Jack Adderley	76	10.82%
Margaret Cook	48	6.84%
N.E.A. Ted Mehler	46	6.55%
Berniece Lambert	3	0.43%
Total valid ballots / Turnout	702	71.06%
Rejected ballots	5	
Source(s) "REPORT OF THE CHIEF ELECTORAL OFFICER ON THE GENERAL ELECTION OF MEMBERS TO THE COUNCIL OF THE NORTHWEST TERRITORIES 1979" (PDF). Elections NWT. January 1980.

== See also ==
- List of Northwest Territories territorial electoral districts
- Canadian provincial electoral districts
