= Shauna Morgan =

Canadian politician

Shauna Morgan MLA

Member of the Legislative Assembly of the Northwest Territories
- Incumbent
- Assumed office November 14, 2023
- Preceded by: Rylund Johnson
- Constituency: Yellowknife North

Personal details
- Party: non-partisan consensus government

Shauna Morgan is a Canadian politician, who was elected to the Legislative Assembly of the Northwest Territories in the 2023 election. She represents the electoral district of Yellowknife North.

She previously served on Yellowknife City Council.

== Election results ==
2023 Northwest Territories general election: Yellowknife North
| Candidate | Votes | % |
|---|---|---|
| Shauna Morgan | 734 | 64.50 |
| Bruce Valpy | 350 | 30.76 |
| Jon Howe | 54 | 4.75 |
| Total votes | 1138 | |
