= Northern Arts and Cultural Centre =

Coordinates: 62°27′09″N 114°21′42″W

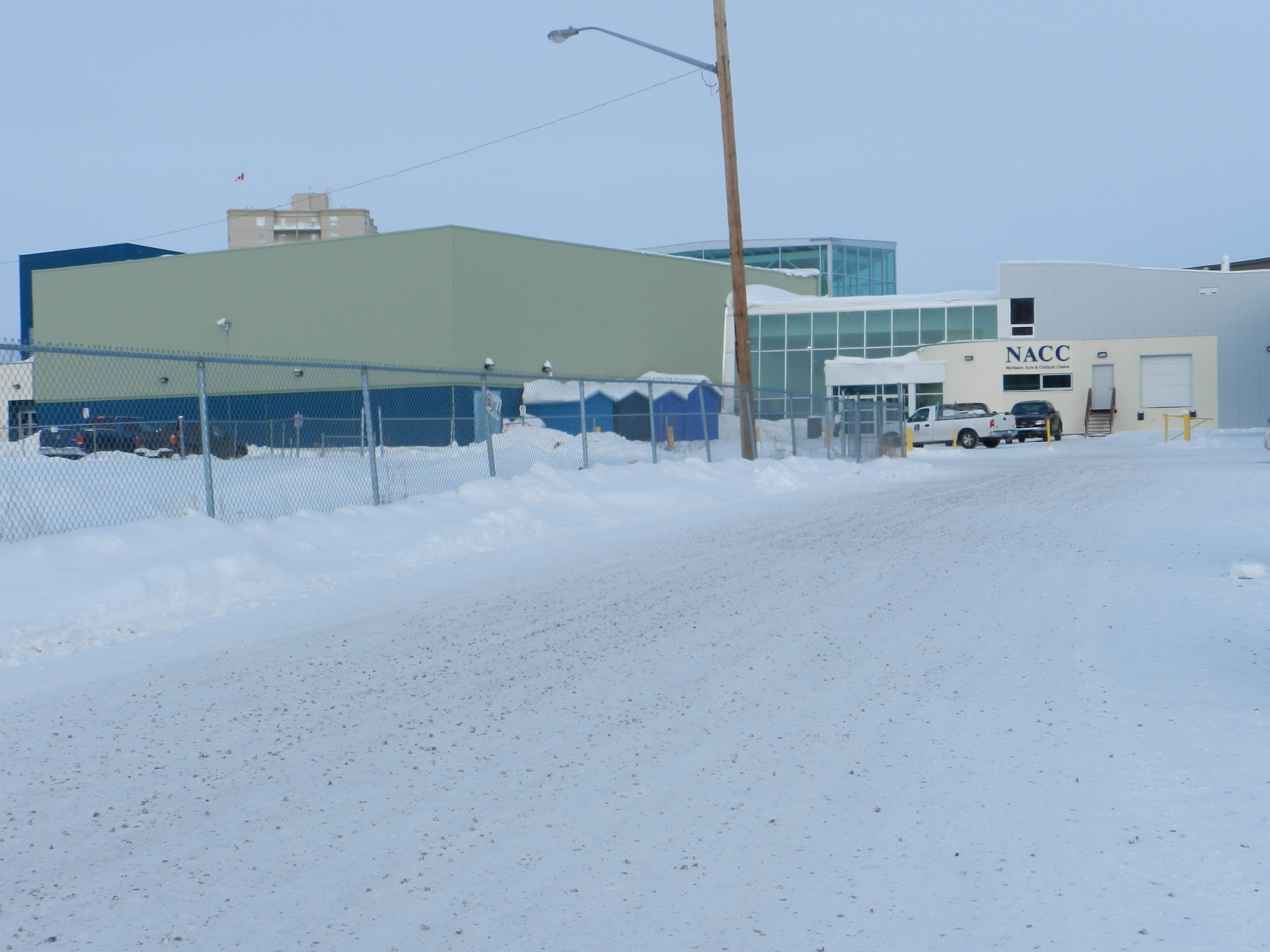
The Northern Arts and Cultural Centre located at Sir John Franklin High School

The Northern Arts and Cultural Centre is located in Yellowknife, Northwest Territories, Canada. It is the only performing arts centre in the NWT.

The 297 seat centre opened May 3, 1984. Created by Yellowknife residents with major support from The Globe and Mail newspaper, the centre was built with government, business, foundation and individual contributions from across Canada. Since then, with a mandate to “encourage the development of the performing arts from all cultural traditions", the institution has become the central point in the territory for community, territorial, national and international performing artists.

NACC is led by a volunteer board of directors. It engages in NWT community and educational activities, supporting programs for emerging and established NWT artists and outreach programmes for NWT schools, community and performing arts groups.

== Facility ==
In 2003 the Centre modernized its technical facilities and was integrated with the Sir John Franklin High School building. The upgraded facilities are now one of the most technically sound theatres, for its size, in North America. The stage has been described as, "an intimate space upon which anything is possible".

The Northern Arts and Cultural Centre held its first annual "Children's Festival of Silliness" in January 2012.
