= Yellowknife Education District No. 1 =

Public school board in Northwest Territories, Canada

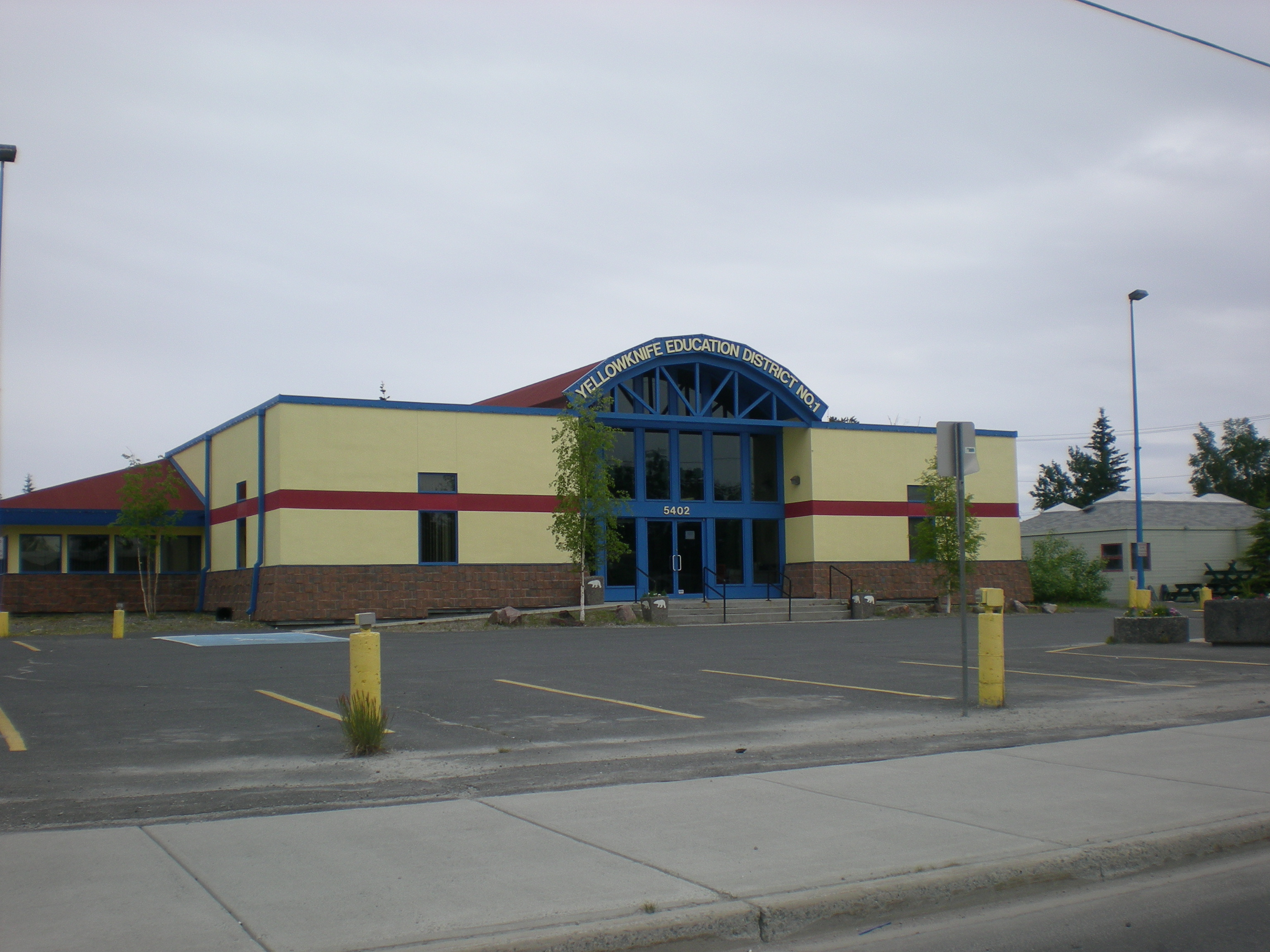
- Yellowknife Education District No. 1 office

Location
- Yellowknife, NT Canada
- Coordinates: 62°27′08″N 114°22′36″W

District information
- Type: Public
- Motto: Educating for Life!
- Superintendent: Shirley Zouboules
- Asst. superintendent(s): Landon Kowalzik
- School board: 7 trustees (including chair)
- Chair of the board: David Wasylciw
- Schools: Eight
- Budget: CA$24.2 million

Students and staff
- Students: >2,000
- Staff: >250

Other information
- Website: www.yk1.nt.ca

The Yellowknife Education District No. 1^{map 1} is the public school board in Yellowknife, Northwest Territories. The district, then called Yellowknife School District No. 1, was created 1 October 1939 by Charles Camsell who was Commissioner of the Northwest Territories.

== History ==
The first meeting of the district was held 24 August 1939 when three people were elected making it the first democratically elected government body in the territory. Prior to the creation of the board a provisional school board had been established in 1938.

The first school in Yellowknife was the Log School House and Mildred Hall, of Fort Fitzgerald, was the first teacher. However, freeze up of the Slave River prevented her from arriving in Yellowknife until February 1939. Prior to her arrival classes were taught by D. A. Davies but he was not an accredited teacher. The building was 4.9 by 4.9 m (16 by 16 ft) and was unable to accommodate all the students at one time, thus classes were split into a morning and afternoon session. Mildred Hall was reappointed as teacher for 1939/40 and was paid $100 a month. This was her last year as a teacher in Yellowknife but she was later to sit on the school board. The school she originally taught in was designated a Yellowknife Heritage Site in 1988 and the building was moved from the Old Town to its current location next to Mildred Hall School and the board offices.

== Yellowknife schools ==
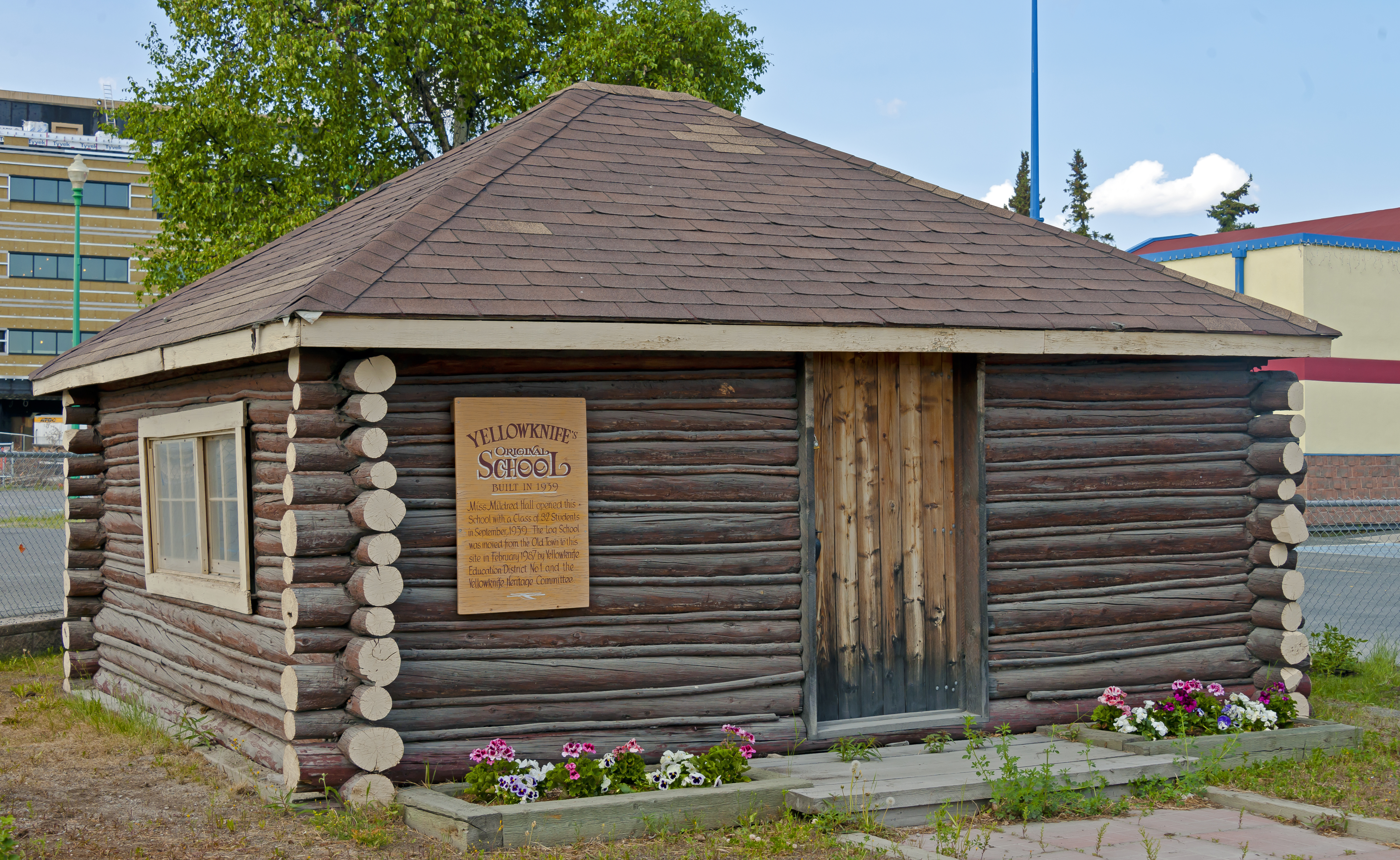
The original Log School House^{map 2}

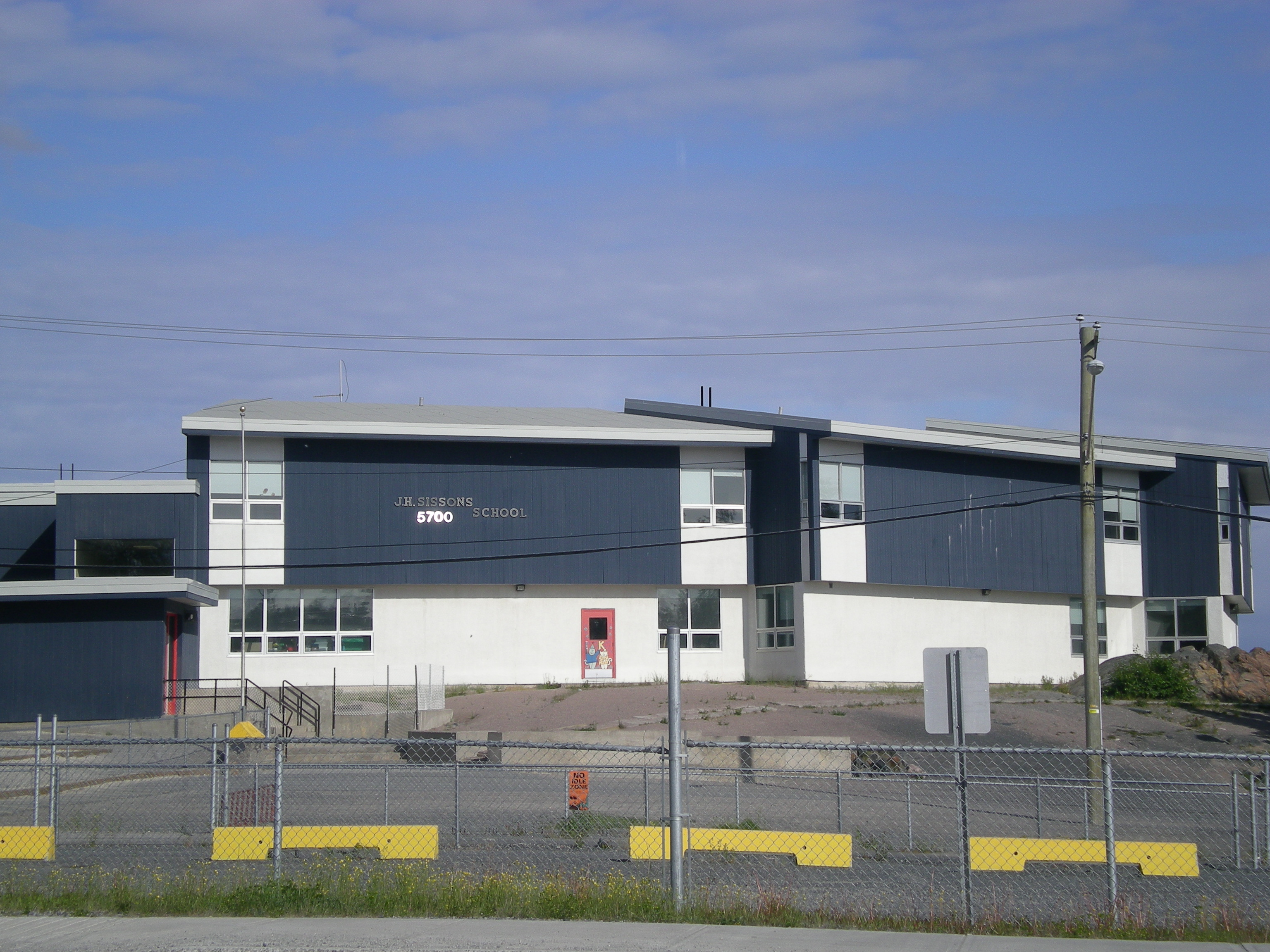
J.H. Sissons School^{map 3}, now École Įtłʼǫ̀

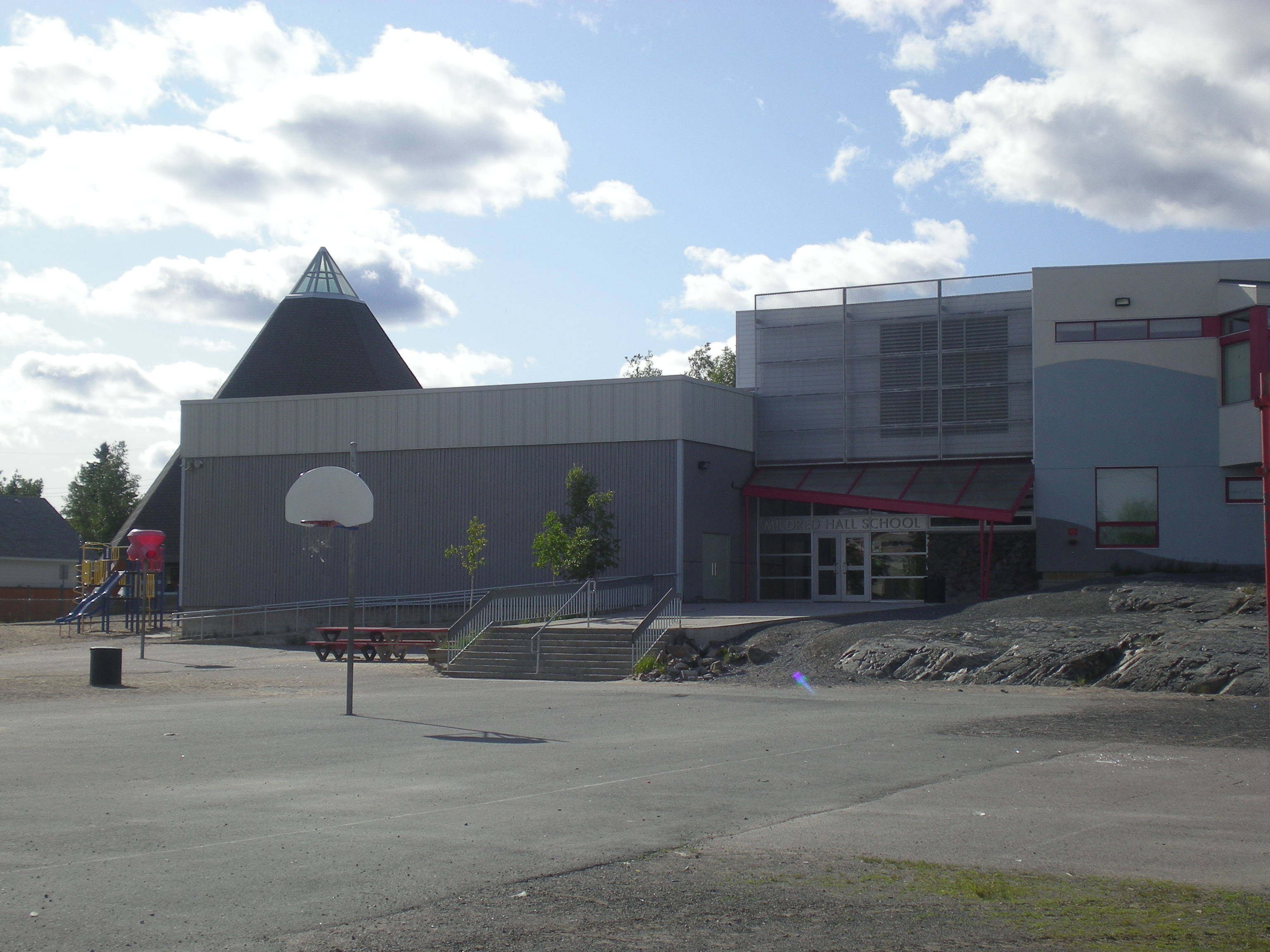
Mildred Hall School^{map 4}

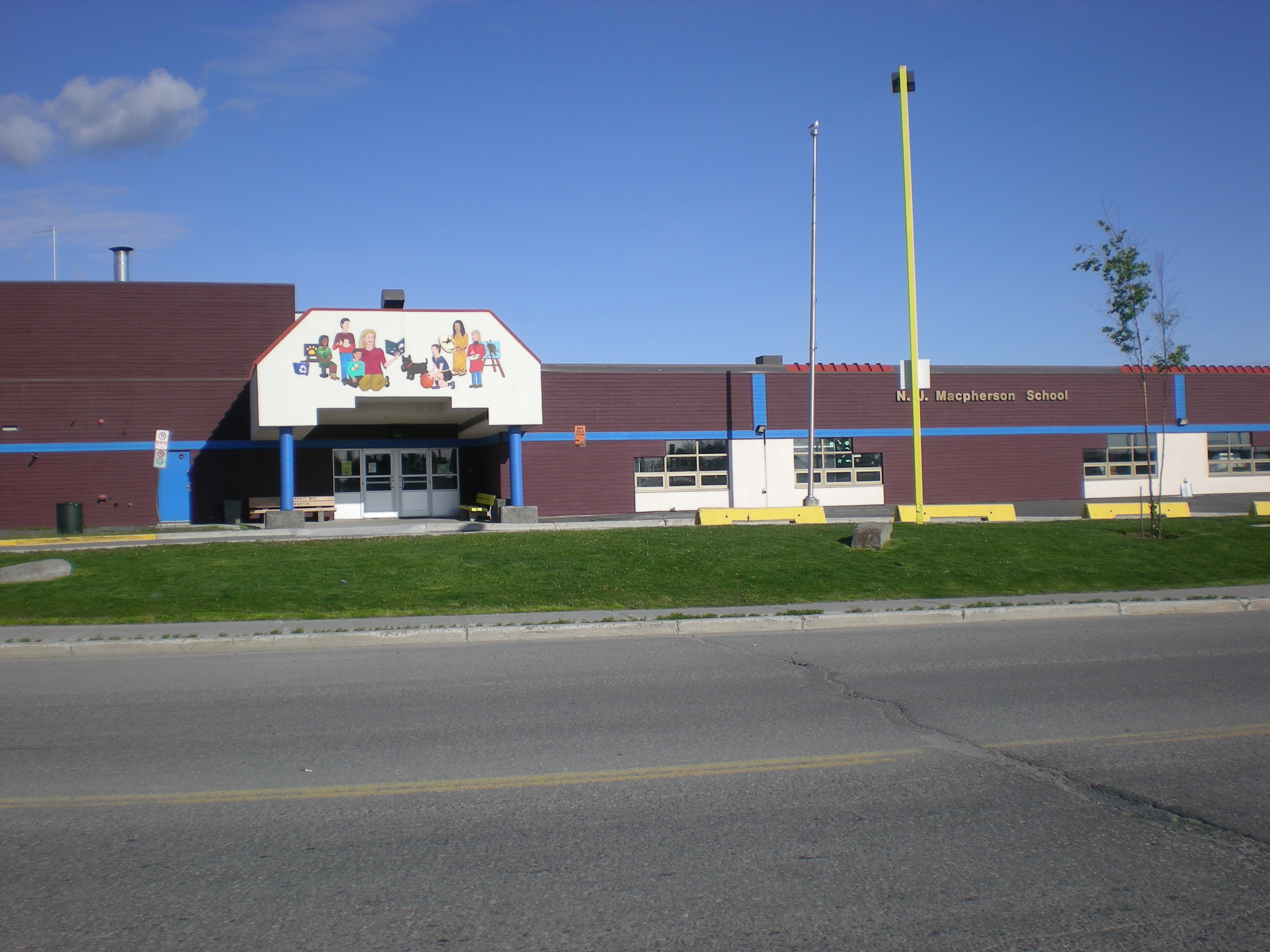
N.J. Macpherson School^{map 5}

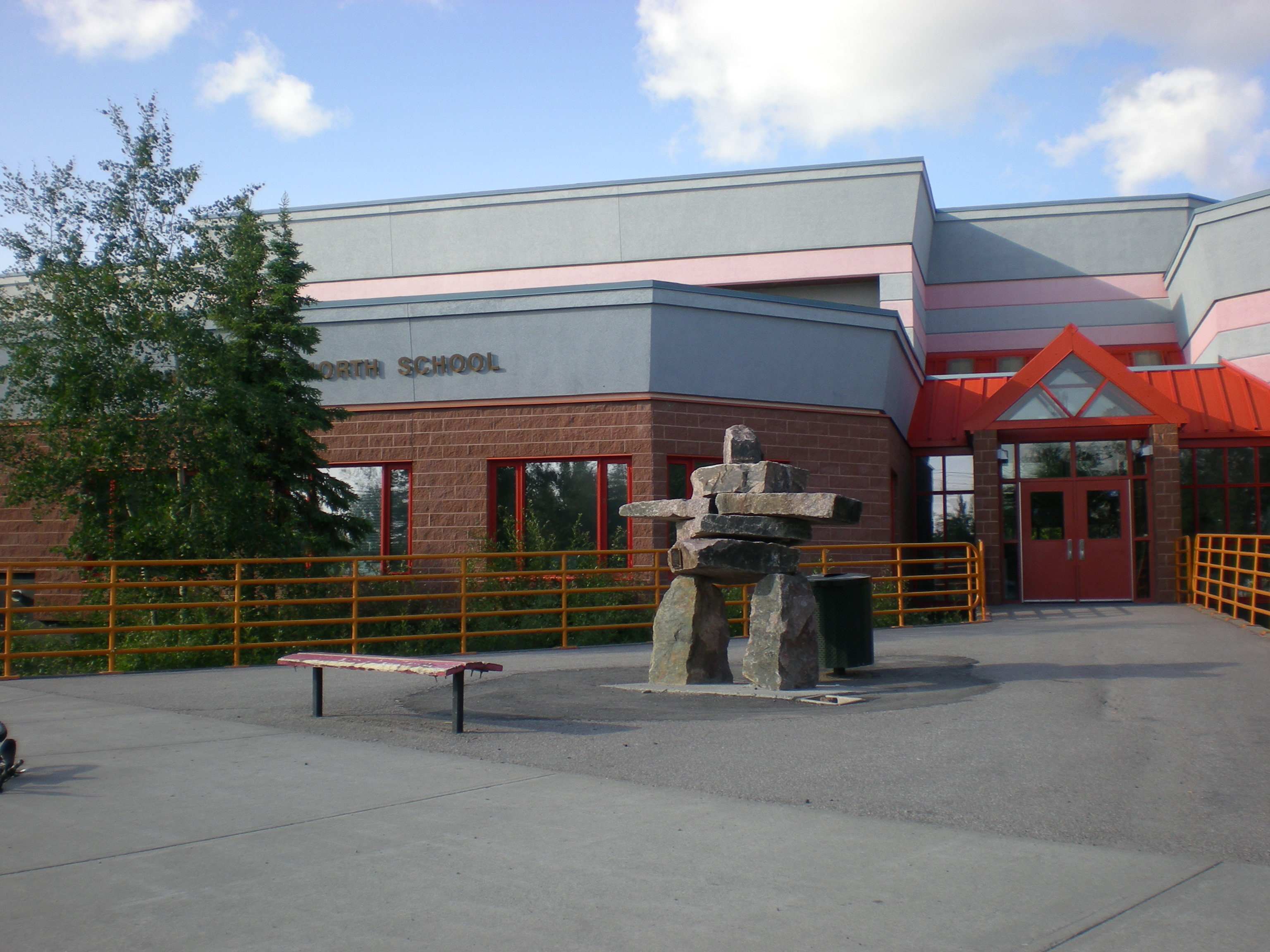
Range Lake North School^{map 6}

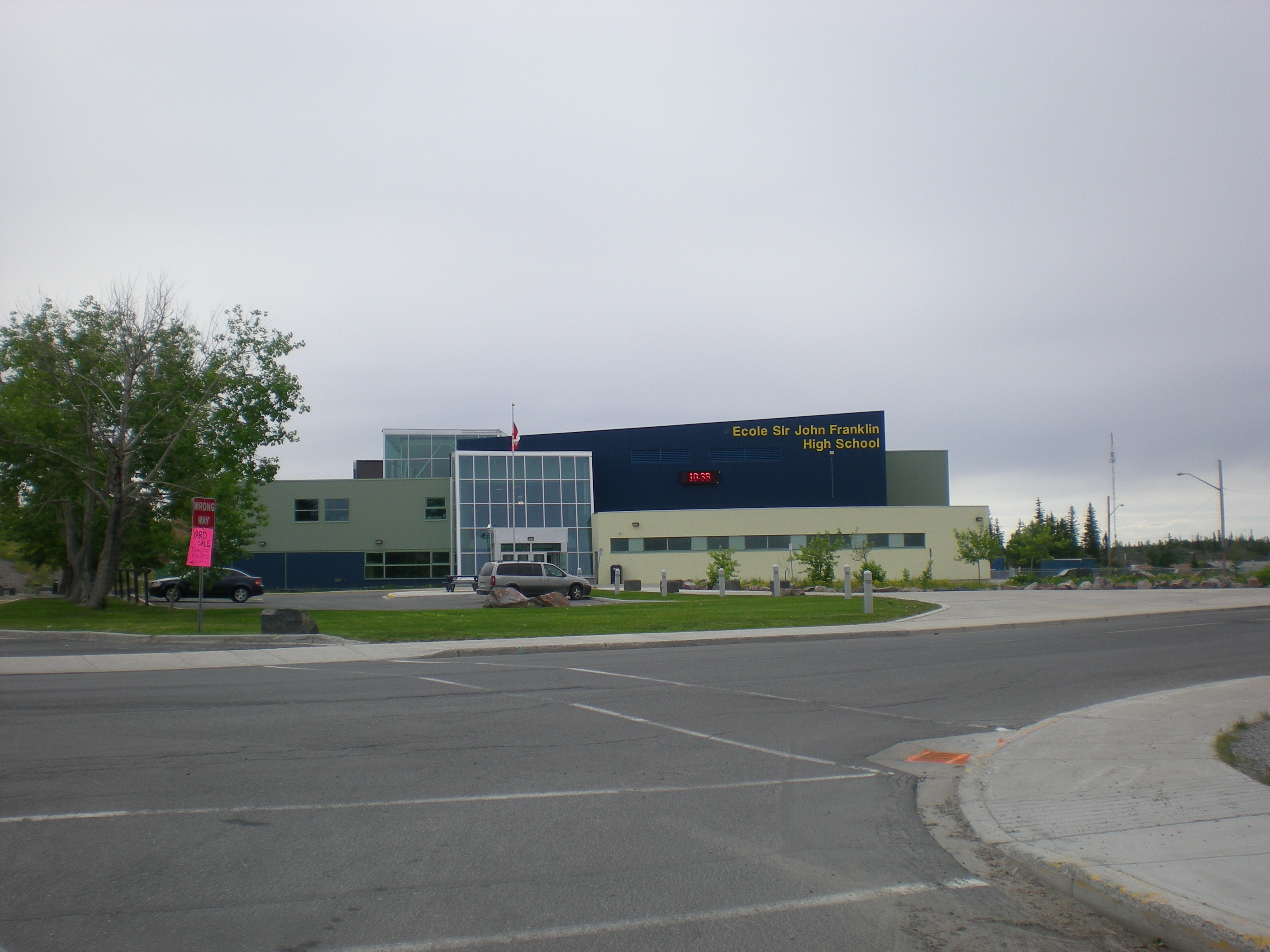
Sir John Franklin High School^{map 7}

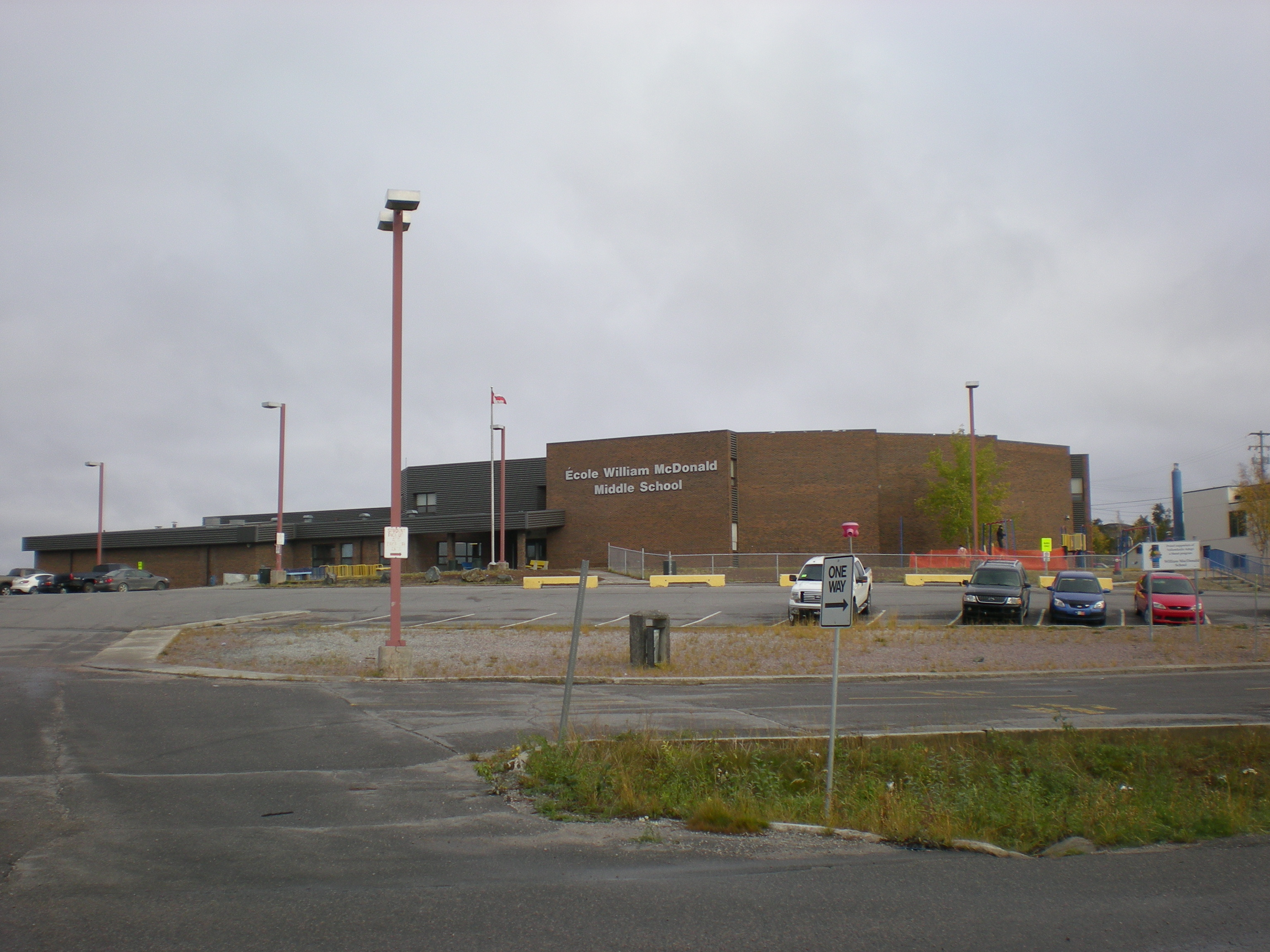
William McDonald Middle School^{map 8}

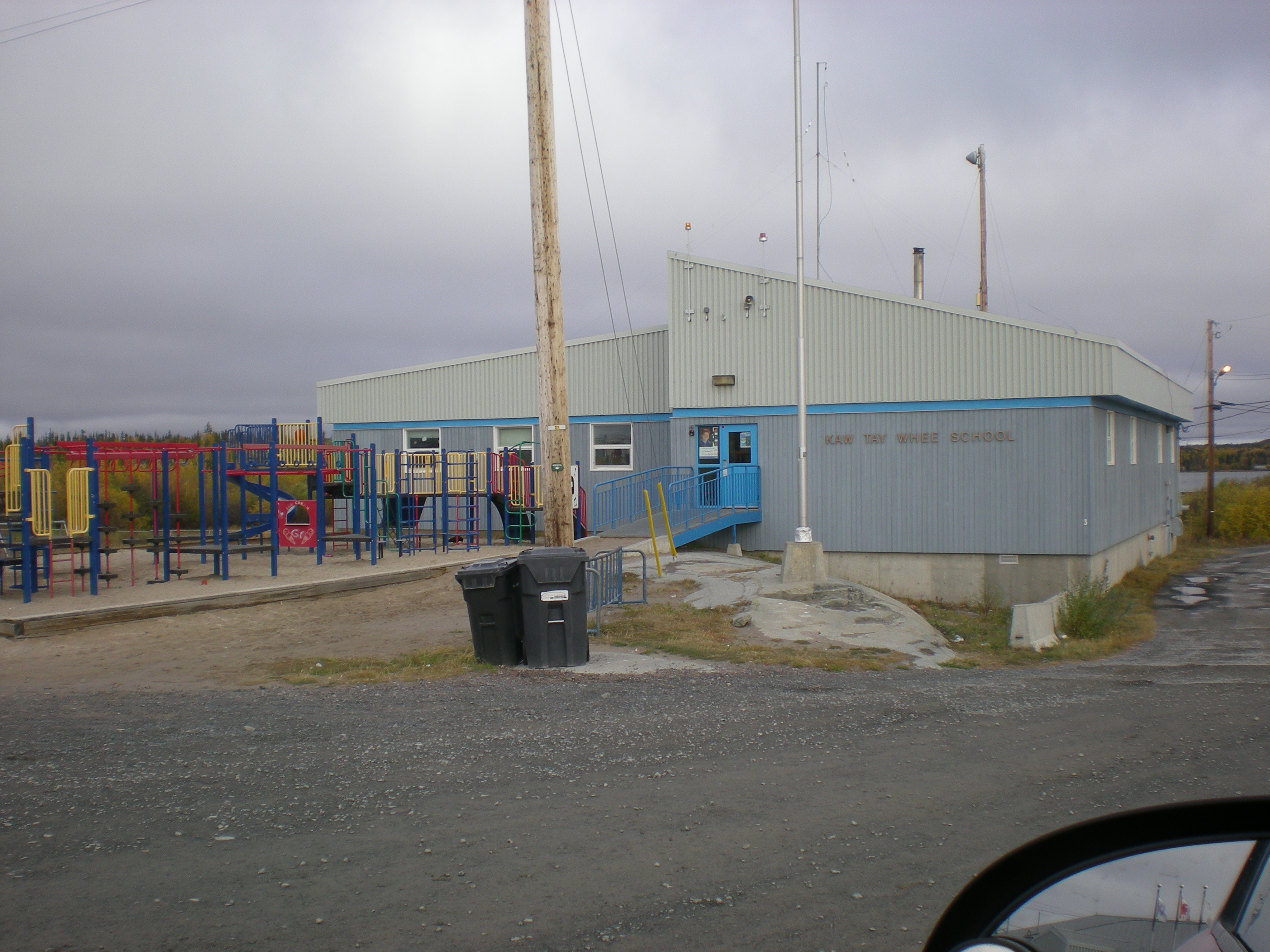
Kaw Tay Whee School^{map 9}

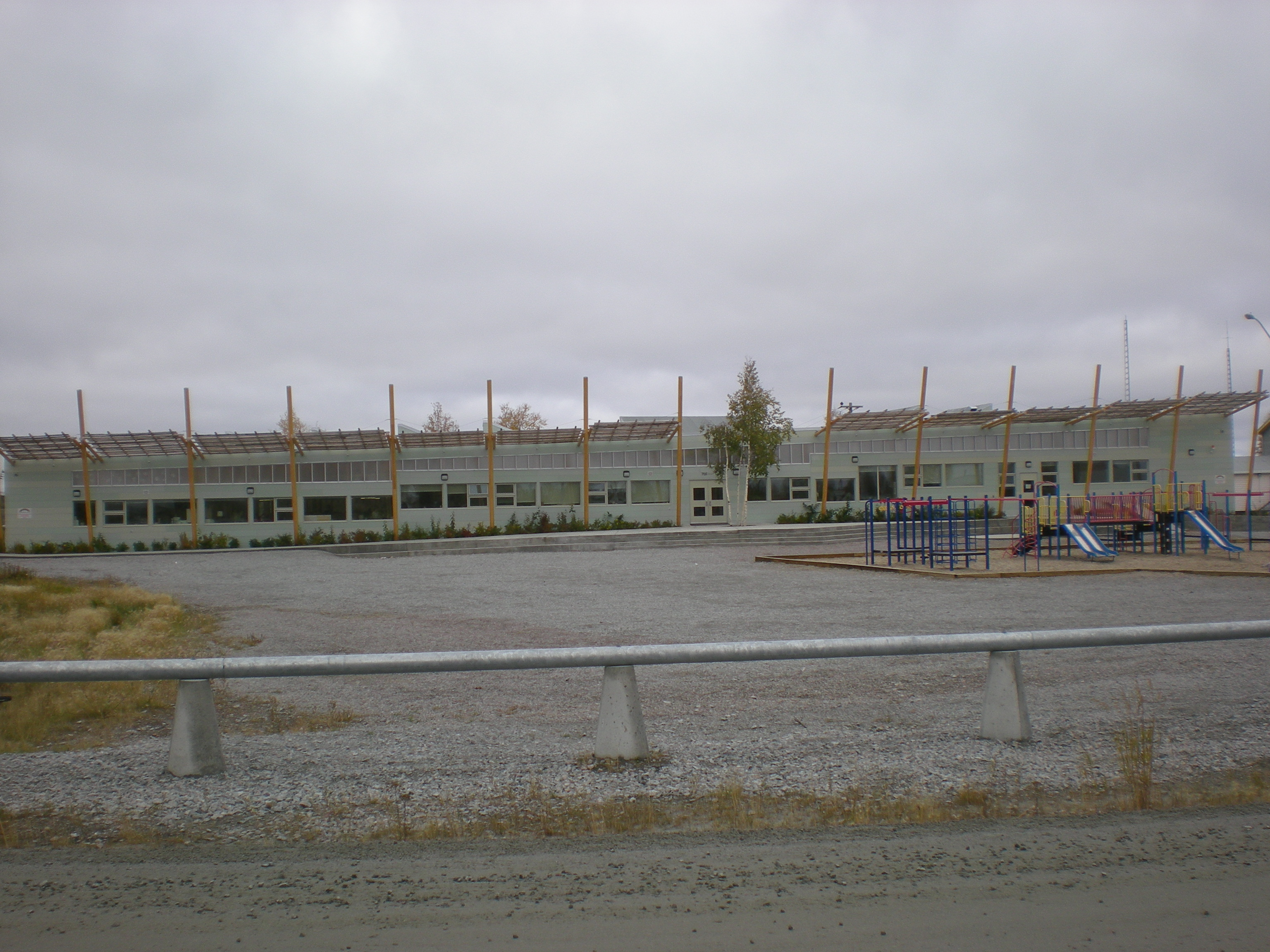
New K'àlemì Dene School^{map 10}

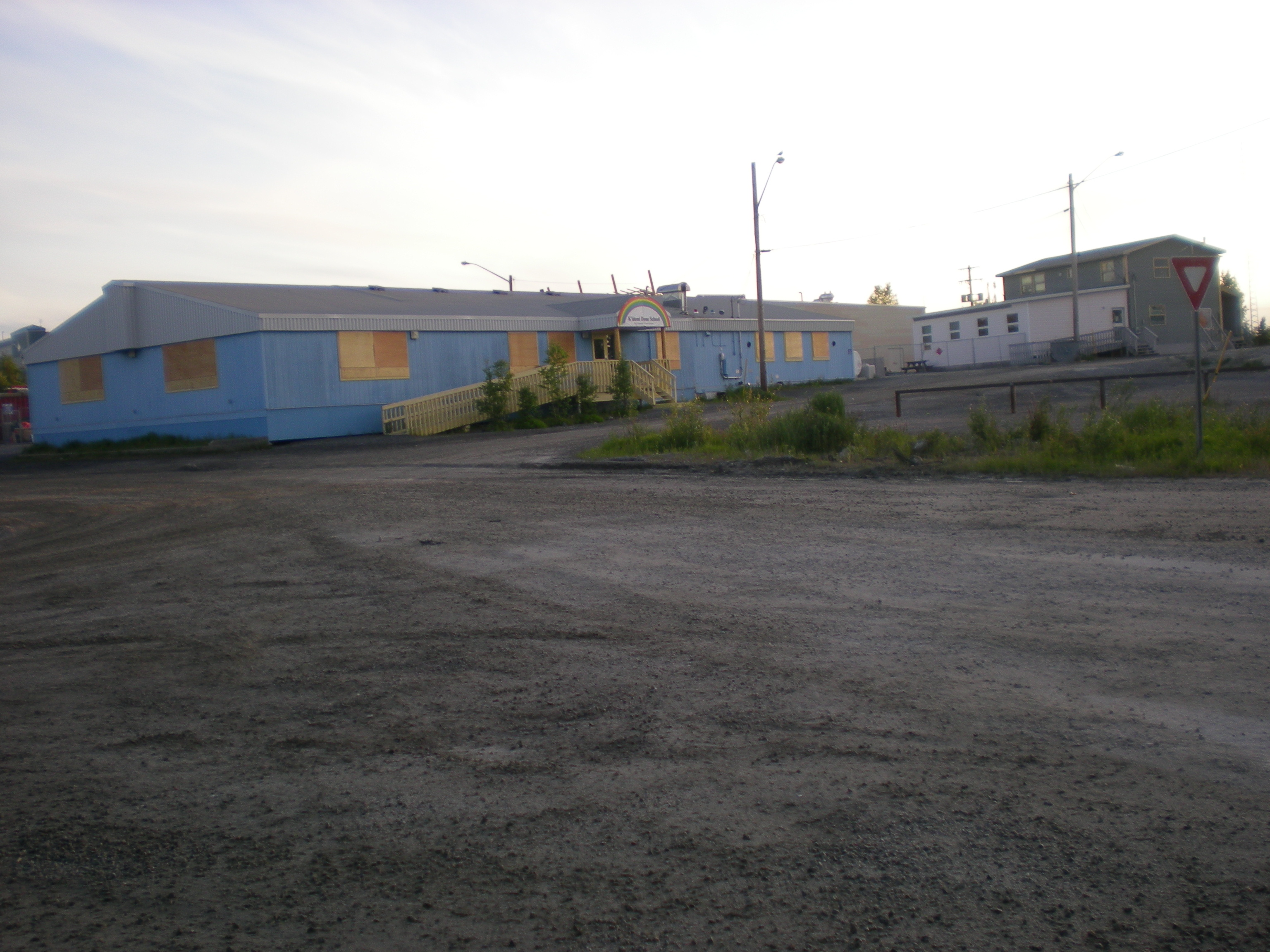
Old K'àlemì Dene School

== List of schools ==
School	Grades	Principal	Staff (Note: Excluding principals. Includes all support staff)	Students (2013)	Notes
École Įtłʼǫ̀	JK – 5	Heidi Boudreau	30	217	The school was opened in October 1975 as part of an expanded public school system for Yellowknife, and was named in honour of former Supreme Court of the Northwest Territories judge, John Sissons. The school as, École Įtłʼǫ̀, reopened in 2022 and runs a French immersion program for all students.
Mildred Hall School	JK – 8	Elizabeth Brace	30	235	The school first opened in September 1965 as Yellowknife Elementary School; it was renamed Mildred Hall School in 1974 in honour of the town's earliest educator. Mildred Hall offers Aboriginal language and culture-based education.
N.J. Macpherson School	JK – 5	Randy Caines	34	257	The school is named after a former local educator, Norman J. MacPherson, who died in 1984. N.J. Macpherson offers an enhanced fine arts program. N.J. has two large playgrounds, basketball courts and a large gym for child fitness. N.J. also offers an Upper and Lower school Montessori program. There is also a large Kindergarten classroom.
Range Lake North School	JK – 8	Scott Willoughby	36	309	Opened in 1993 the school is named for its geographic location. Range Lake offers a grade 6 intensive French immersion program, and a pre-school user-pay program.
Sir John Franklin High School	9 – 12	Dean MacInnis	66	>700 (2024)	Opened in 1958 as a new Federal School for the Northwest Territories. The school is named for the explorer Sir John Franklin.
William McDonald Middle School	6 – 8	Jodi Lee-Lewis	20	169	The school was opened in September 1982 as a replacement for an earlier school of the same name. The school is named for a prospector and naturalist, William McDonald. In addition to English, William McDonald offers the French immersion program for all students.
Kaw Tay Whee School	JK – 12	Meagan Wowk	10	30 (2024)	Located in Dettah the school offers English and Dogrib (Weledeh Dialect). They also emphasize traditional Dene culture. The original school opened in 1969 and consisted of two rooms.
K'àlemì Dene School	JK – 12	Lea Lamoureux	18		Originally opened in 2000 the current school was opened in 2009. Located in Ndilǫ the school offers English and Dogrib (Weledeh Dialect). They use the Dene Kede Curriculum.

== See also ==
- List of schools in the Northwest Territories
- Education in Canada

== Mapping ==
- YK No. 1, 62°27′08″N 114°22′36″W
- Old Log Cabin School, 62°27′07″N 114°22′36″W
- J.H. Sissons School, 62°26′49″N 114°22′32″W
- Mildred Hall School, 62°27′07″N 114°22′45″W
- N.J. Macpherson School, 62°26′22″N 114°24′59″W
- Range Lake North School, 62°27′02″N 114°24′56″W
- Sir John Franklin High School, 62°27′09″N 114°21′42″W
- William McDonald Middle School, 62°26′31″N 114°23′28″W
- Kaw Tay Whee School, 62°24′41″N 114°18′29″W
- K'àlemì Dene School, 62°28′28″N 114°20′14″W
