= Julian Morse =

Canadian politician

Julian Morse MLA

Member of the Legislative Assembly of the Northwest Territories
- Incumbent
- Assumed office November 14, 2023
- Preceded by: Kevin O'Reilly
- Constituency: Frame Lake

Personal details
- Party: non-partisan consensus government

Julian Morse is a Canadian politician, who was elected to the Legislative Assembly of the Northwest Territories in the 2023 election. He represents the electoral district of Frame Lake.

He previously served on Yellowknife City Council.

== Election results ==
2023 Northwest Territories general election: Frame Lake
Candidate	Votes	%
Julian Morse	209	32.91
Spencer Tracy	182	28.66
Stuart Wray	169	26.61
John Stanley	49	7.72
Deanna Cornfield	26	4.09
Total votes	635	
