= K'àlemì Dene School =

School in the Northwest Territories, Canada

K'alemi Dene School
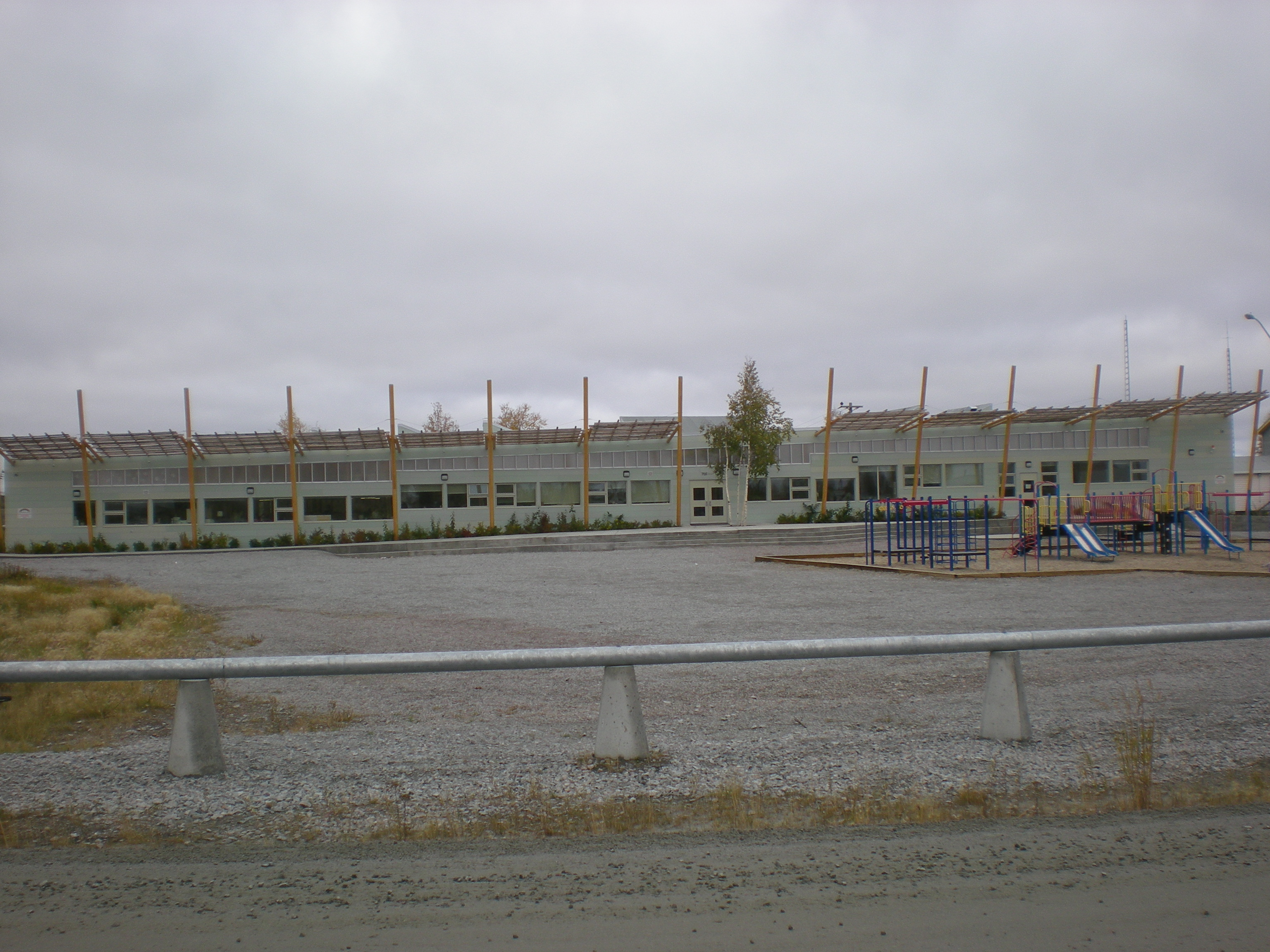

Location
- N'Dilo, Northwest Territories; Canada
- Coordinates: 62°28′40″N 114°20′03″W

Information
- School board: Yellowknife Education District No. 1
- Principal: Eileen Erasmus
- Grades: 9-12
- Language: English, Dogrib
- Website: www.yk1.nt.ca/schools/community_schools.html

K'alemi Dene School is a public school located in N'Dilo, Northwest Territories. It serves grades K-10 and is a part of the Yellowknife Education District No. 1.
