= Frame Lake (electoral district) =

Territorial electoral district in the Northwest Territories, Canada

Northwest Territories electoral district
- Boundaries of Frame Lake in Yellowknife

Territorial electoral district
- Legislature: Legislative Assembly of the Northwest Territories
MLA
Julian Morse
- First contested: 1991
- Last contested: 2023

Demographics
- Census subdivision: Yellowknife

Frame Lake is a territorial electoral district for the Legislative Assembly of the Northwest Territories, Canada. It is one of seven districts that represent Yellowknife.

== Members of the Legislative Assembly (MLAs) ==
Name	Elected	Left Office
Charles Dent	1991	2007
Wendy Bisaro	2007	2015
Kevin O'Reilly	2015	2023
Julian Morse	2023	present

== Election results ==
=== 2023 election ===
2023 Northwest Territories general election
Candidate	Votes	%
Julian Morse	209	32.91
Spencer Tracy	182	28.66
Stuart Wray	169	26.61
John Stanley	49	7.72
Deanna Cornfield	26	4.09
Total votes	635	

=== 2019 election ===
2019 Northwest Territories general election
Candidate	Votes
Kevin O'Reilly	357
Dave Ramsay	346

=== 2015 election ===
2015 Northwest Territories general election
Candidate	Votes	%
Kevin O'Reilly	156	28.6
Jan Fullerton	141	25.8
David Wasylciw	132	24.2
Roy Erasmus	117	21.4
Total valid ballots / Turnout	546	28%

=== 2011 election ===
2011 Northwest Territories general election
Candidate	Votes
Wendy Bisaro	328
Duff Spence	240
Bernard LeBlanc	30

=== 2007 election ===
2007 Northwest Territories general election
Candidate	Votes	%
Wendy Bisaro	389	56.05%
Chris Johnston	162	23.34%
Jeff Groenewegen	137	19.74%
Total valid ballots / Turnout	688	45.27%
Rejected ballots	6	
Source(s) "Official Voting Results 2007 General Election" (PDF). Elections NWT. Archived from the original (PDF) on 11 April 2008.

=== 2003 election ===
2003 Northwest Territories general election
Candidate	Votes	%
Charles Dent	408	62.96%
David Wind	240	37.04%
Total valid ballots / Turnout	648	45.70%
Rejected ballots	1	
Source(s) "Official Voting Results 2003 General Election" (PDF). Elections NWT. Archived from the original (PDF) on 11 April 2008.

=== 1999 election ===
1999 Northwest Territories general election
Candidate	Votes	%
Charles Dent	352	49.65%
David Wind	288	40.62%
Bill Schram	69	9.73%
Total valid ballots / Turnout	709	55.31%
Rejected ballots 4		
Source(s) "Official Voting Results 1999 General Election" (PDF). Elections NWT. Archived from the original (PDF) on 11 April 2008.

=== 1995 election ===
1995 Northwest Territories general election
Candidate	Votes	%
Charles Dent	446	59.31%
Rob Roman	135	17.95%
David McCann	122	16.22%
Total valid ballots / Turnout		49.4%

=== 1991 election ===
1991 Northwest Territories general election
Candidate	Votes	%
Charles Dent	313	46.79%
Arlene Hache	214	31.99%
Noel Montiagano	132	19.73%
David Barry	10	1.49%
Total vote / Turnout	672	53.67%
Source(s) "Report of the Chief Electoral Officer on the Elections of Members to the Council of the Northwest Territories, 1991" (PDF). Elections Northwest Territories.

== Notes ==
a: In the 2007 election, percentages assigned to candidates were based on the total votes cast. In prior elections the percentages were based on the valid votes.

== See also ==
- List of Northwest Territories territorial electoral districts
- Canadian provincial electoral districts
