= Cory Vanthuyne =

Canadian politician

Member of the Legislative Assembly of the Northwest Territories for Yellowknife North
- In office November 23, 2015 – September 2, 2019
- Preceded by: Riding Established
- Succeeded by: Rylund Johnson

Personal details
- Born: August 27, 1970 Inuvik, Northwest Territories or New Westminster, British Columbia
- Party: non-partisan consensus government

Cory E. Vanthuyne is a Canadian politician, who was elected to the Legislative Assembly of the Northwest Territories in the 2015 election. He represented the electoral district of Yellowknife North until the 2019 election, when he was defeated by Rylund Johnson.

Prior to his election to the legislature, Vanthuyne served two terms on Yellowknife City Council.

Vanthuyne is also a curler. He won the Northwest Territories Men's Curling Championship in 2012 playing second for the Steve Moss rink.
