= Kevin O'Reilly (politician) =

Canadian politician

Kevin O'Reilly MLA

Member of the Legislative Assembly of the Northwest Territories
- In office November 23, 2015 – November 14, 2023
- Preceded by: Wendy Bisaro
- Succeeded by: Julian Morse
- Constituency: Frame Lake

Personal details
- Party: non-partisan consensus government

Kevin O'Reilly is a Canadian politician, who was elected to the Legislative Assembly of the Northwest Territories in the 2015 election. He represents the electoral district of Frame Lake.

O'Reilly is the Chair of the Standing Committee on Accountability and Oversight, a Member of the Standing Committee on Economic Development and Environment, an Alternate Member of the Standing Committee on Government Operations, and a Member of the Standing Committee on Rules and Procedures of the Legislative Assembly of the Northwest Territories. O'Reilly occupies the role of self-appointed environmental watchdog as an MLA.
