= Roy Erasmus =

Canadian politician

Member of the Legislative Assembly of the Northwest Territories
- In office 1995–1999
- Preceded by: Michael Ballantyne
- Succeeded by: riding dissolved
- Constituency: Yellowknife North

Personal details
- Party: non-partisan consensus government

Roy Erasmus is a politician and lawyer from Northwest Territories, Canada. He is a former member of the Legislative Assembly of the Northwest Territories.

Erasmus was elected to the Northwest Territories Legislature in the 1995 Northwest Territories general election. Erasmus' electoral district was abolished at the end of his first term and he ran for re-election in the new Weledeh electoral district. He was easily defeated by Joe Handley in the 1999 Northwest Territories general election.

Following his election loss to Joe Handley, Erasmus worked as a Director for the Ministry of Aboriginal Affairs in the Government of the Northwest Territories for 6 years. In September 2006, Erasmus entered the University of Alberta. He was awarded a Masters in Business Administration (MBA), with a major in Public Administration, in the fall of 2008. He has been an Assistant Deputy Minister in the Department of Education and Culture for the Government of the Northwest Territories since September 2008.
