= Sir John Franklin High School =

École Sir John Franklin High School

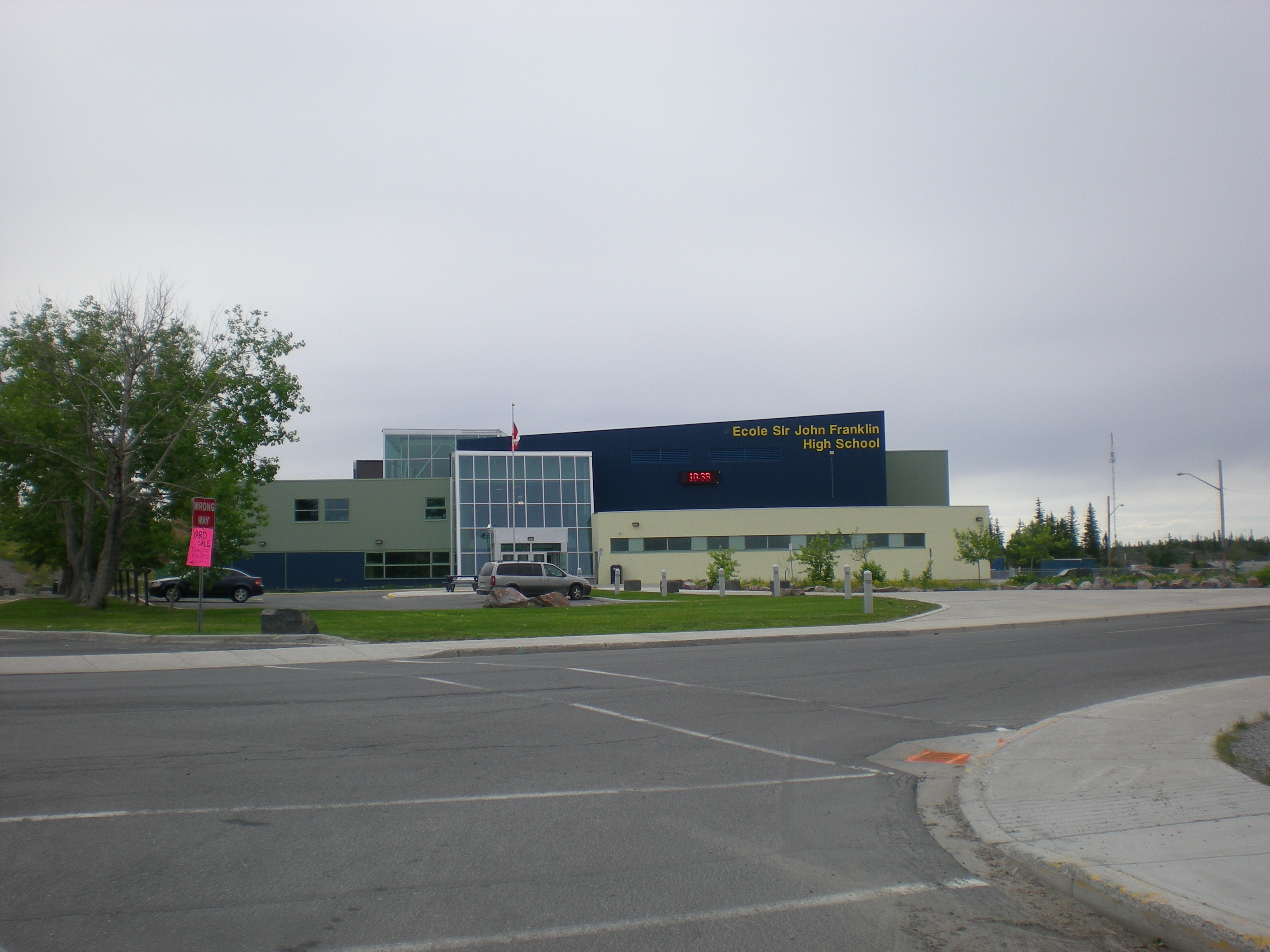

Location
- 4701 - 52nd Avenue; Yellowknife, Northwest Territories, X1A 2N8; Canada; 62°27′09″N 114°21′42″W

Information
- Established: 1958
- School board: Yellowknife Education District No. 1
- Principal: Dean MacInnis
- Grades: 9-12
- Enrollment: 700+
- Language: English, French immersion
- Website: www.sjf.yk1.nt.ca

École Sir John Franklin High School is a high school in Yellowknife, Northwest Territories, Canada, operated by Yellowknife Education District No. 1. The school is named for the explorer Sir John Franklin.

Sir John Franklin (SJFHS) offers the French immersion program and a comprehensive fine arts program including music, drama and art.

On a regular day, the school follows a modified block schedule, consisting of Day 1 and Day 2. School is in session from 8:30 AM to 3:23 PM from Mondays through Fridays.

== Facility ==
SJFHS first opened in 1958 as a new Federal School for the Northwest Territories. It underwent expansions in 1964, 1969, 1974, and a major renovation in 2003. The facility now comprises 9600m2 and includes a new town plaza with cafe, science wing, art gallery, gymnasium, and is co-located with the Northern Arts and Cultural Centre (NACC). The Communications Arts Centre includes a television studio, edit suites, music room, and drama room. Career technology functions include a woodworking and aviation studio, the north’s only automotive shop, and computer-based business and tourism instruction.

In 2003 the school partnered with a private company to install a 2.0 kW (2,000 Watt) photovoltaic solar system on the school's roof. The system is connected to the local utility grid. One of the goals of the project was to educate the students and general population about the use of alternate energies in the North and serve an ongoing student-operated science project.

== Notable alumni ==
- Susan Aglukark, musician
- Michael Gilday, short-track speed skater
- Nancy Karetak-Lindell, Canadian Member of Parliament
- Kevin Koe, world champion curler
- Jackson Lafferty, Grand Chief of the Tłı̨chǫ Government and former Member of the Legislative Assembly of the Northwest Territories
- Dustin Milligan, actor
- Tanya Tagaq, Inuk throat singer

== See also ==
- List of schools in the Northwest Territories
