= Yellowknife City Council =

Yellowknife City Council is the governing body of the city of Yellowknife, Northwest Territories, Canada. The council consists of a mayor and eight councillors originally elected to three year terms, but after a referendum in 2018 this has now been changed to four year terms.

The current mayor of Yellowknife is Ben Hendriksen. He was appointed Mayor by the council after the resignation of Rebecca Alty in 2025. She resigned due to her election victory in her bid to become the Northwest Territories Member of Parliament in the 2025 federal election.

== 2026–2030 council ==
- Melissa Syer, mayor
- Cody Drygeese
- Adrian Bell
- Donna Lee Demarcke
- Rob Warburton
- Steve Payne
- Rylund Johnson
- Rob Foote
- Keneisha Buddoo

== 2022-2026 council ==
- Rebecca Alty, mayor (resigned in 2025 after becoming the NWT Member of Parliament)
- Rob Warburton
- Cat McGurk
- Stacie Arden Smith
- Tom McLennan
- Garett Cochrane
- Ryan Fequet
- Steve Payne
- Rob Foote, (appointed to vacant seat left by Ben Hendriksen when he became mayor)
- Ben Hendriksen, (became Mayor after the resignation of Rebecca Alty in 2025).

== 2018-2022 council ==
In the 2018 election, voters chose to extend the term of office from three to four years.

- Rebecca Alty, mayor
- Shauna Morgan
- Julian Morse
- Robin Williams
- Steve Payne
- Stacie Smith
- Niels Konge
- Cynthia Mufandaedza
- Rommel Silverio

== Election results (mayor) ==
=== 2022 ===
Mayoral Candidate	Vote	%
Rebecca Alty	Acclaimed	

=== 2018 ===
Mayoral Candidate	Vote	%
Rebecca Alty	2,938	54.99
Adrian Bell	2,210	41.36
Bob Stewart	102	1.91
Jerald Sibbeston	93	1.74

=== 2015 ===
Mayoral Candidate	Vote	%
Mark Heyck	4,479	76.04
John Himmelman	1,411	23.96

=== 2012 ===
Mayoral Candidate	Vote	%
Mark Heyck	2,008	46.82
Tim Doyle	1,465	34.16
Paul Falvo	816	19.03

=== 2009 ===
Mayoral Candidate	Vote	%
Gordon Van Tighem	2,497	73.77
Bryan Sutherland	592	17.49
John Westergreen	296	8.74

=== 2006 ===
Mayoral Candidate	Vote	%
Gordon Van Tighem	Acclaimed	

=== 2003 ===
Mayoral Candidate	Vote	%
Gordon Van Tighem	Acclaimed	

=== 2000 ===
Mayoral Candidate	Vote	%
Gordon Van Tighem	1,555	37.47
Bob Brooks	1,355	32.65
David Lovell	899	21.66
Cheryl Best	341	8.22

== Election Results (Councillors) ==
=== 2022 ===
2022 had 3,939 voters out of an eligible 8,190, which represents a 48% voter turnout. This is down from the 56% turn out in 2018.

Councillor Candidates	Votes	%	Elected (8)
Rob Warburton	2,172	55.1%	Yes
Cat McGurk	2,132	54.1%	Yes
Stacie Smith	2,116	53.7%	Yes
Tom McLennan	1,883	47.8%	Yes
Garett Cochrane	1,831	46.4%	Yes
Ryan Fequet	1,711	43.4%	Yes
Steve Payne	1,642	41.6%	Yes
Ben Hendriksen	1,564	39.7%	Yes
Rob Foote	1,444	36.6%	No
Dwane Simmons	1,093	27.7%	No
Rommel Silverio	1,080	27.4%	No
Devon Hodder	1,059	26.8%	No
Mike Martin	1,030	26.1%	No
Beaton Mackenzie	917	23.2%	No
Stewart Pallard	691	17.5%	No
John Fredericks	623	15.8%	No

=== 2018 ===
2018 saw 5,354 voters out of an eligible 9,544, which represents a 56% voter turnout.

Councillor Candidates	Vote^{10]}	%	Elected (8)
Shauna Morgan (incumbent)	3,398	63.5	Yes
Julian Morse (incumbent)	2,895	54.2	Yes
Robin Williams	2,845	53.2	Yes
Steve Payne (incumbent)	2,671	49.9	Yes
Stacie Smith	2,517	47.1	Yes
Niels Konge (incumbent)	2,459	46	Yes
Cynthia Mufandaedza	2,160	40.4	Yes
Rommel Silverio (incumbent)	2,027	37.9	Yes
Chris Gillander	1,968	36.8	No
Edwin Castillo	1,954	36.6	No
Dane Mason	1,741	32.6	No
Terry Testart	1,265	23.7	No
William Gomes	1,185	22.2	No
Josh Campbell	969	18.1	No
John Dalton	957	17.9	No
Mark Bogan	530	9.9	No

==== Referendum in 2018 election to increase term of office for City Council from three to four years ====
Bylaw 4969 to increase the term of office for City Council from three to four years	Vote^{10]}	%
Yes	3,096	57.9
No	2,013	37.7
Didn't vote	235	0.44
