= 20th Northwest Territories Legislative Assembly =

- Consensus parliament
- Dec. 8, 2023 – present

Parliament leaders
- Premier: R. J. Simpson; Dec. 8, 2023 – present

Legislative Assembly
- Speaker of the Assembly: Shane Thompson; Dec. 7, 2023 – present
- Members: 19 seats

Sovereign
- Monarch: Charles III; Sep. 8, 2022 – present
- Commissioner: Margaret Thom; Sep. 18, 2017 – May. 14, 2024
- Gerald Kisoun; May. 14, 2024 – present
← 19th

The 20th Northwest Territories Legislative Assembly in Canada was established by the results of the 2023 Northwest Territories general election on November 14, 2023.

== Membership ==
Member	District	First elected / previously elected	No. of terms
Sheryl Yakeleya	Deh Cho	2023	1st term
Julian Morse	Frame Lake	2023	1st term
Kate Reid	Great Slave	2023	1st term
R. J. Simpson	Hay River North	2015	3rd term
Vince McKay	Hay River South	2023	1st term
Denny Rodgers	Inuvik Boot Lake	2023	1st term
Vacant	Inuvik Twin Lakes	2026 by-election	
Caitlin Cleveland	Kam Lake	2019	2nd term
George Nerysoo	Mackenzie Delta	2023	1st term
Jane Armstrong	Monfwi	2021	2nd term
Shane Thompson	Nahendeh	2015	3rd term
Lucy Kuptana	Nunakput	2023	1st term
Kieron Testart	Range Lake	2015, (Note: Kam Lake) 2023	2nd term*
Daniel McNeely	Sahtu	2015, 2023	2nd term*
Jay MacDonald	Thebacha	2023	1st term
Richard Edjericon	Tu Nedhé-Wiilideh	2022	2nd term
Robert Hawkins	Yellowknife Centre	2003, 2023	4th term*
Shauna Morgan	Yellowknife North	2023	1st term
Caroline Wawzonek	Yellowknife South	2019	2nd term

== Executive Council of the Northwest Territories ==
Cabinet of the 20th Northwest Territories Legislative Assembly
Portfolio	Minister
Premier; Government House Leader; Minister of Executive and Indigenous Affairs; Minister of Justice	R.J. Simpson
Deputy Premier; Minister of Finance; Minister of Infrastructure; Minister Responsible for the Northwest Territories Power Corporation	Caroline Wawzonek
Minister of Education, Culture and Employment; Minister of Industry, Tourism and Investment	Caitlin Cleveland
Minister Responsible for Housing NWT; Minister Responsible for the Status of Women; Minister of Health and Social Services	Lucy Kuptana
Minister of Environment and Climate Change	Jay MacDonald
Minister of Municipal and Community Affairs; Minister Responsible for the Workers’ Safety and Compensation Commission; Minister Responsible for the Public Utilities Board	Vince McKay
