= 19th Northwest Territories Legislative Assembly =

- Consensus parliament
- Oct. 1, 2019 – Oct. 15, 2023

Parliament leaders
- Premier: Caroline Cochrane; October 24, 2019 – December 8, 2023

Legislative Assembly
- Speaker of the Assembly: Frederick Blake Jr. October 24, 2019 – November 14, 2023
- Members: 19 seats

Sovereign
- Monarch: Elizabeth II; 6 February 1952 – 8 September 2022
- Charles III; 8 September 2022 – present
- Commissioner: Margaret Thom; 18 September 2017 – 14 May 2024
← 18th	→ 20th

The 19th Northwest Territories Legislative Assembly in Canada was established by the results of the 2019 Northwest Territories general election on October 1, 2019.

In the 2019 election, 9 of the 19 MLAs elected were women, a record in NWT and, proportionally, in all of Canada. Previously, the most sitting women MLAs was three. On July 27, 2021, following the resignation of Jackson Lafferty and the subsequent by-election victory of Jane Weyallon Armstrong, the Legislature had 10 women to 9 men, and became the first jurisdiction in Canada to have a majority of women legislators.

== Membership ==
Member	District	First elected / previously elected	No. of terms
Ronald Bonnetrouge	Deh Cho	2019	1st term
Kevin O'Reilly	Frame Lake	2015	2nd term
Katrina Nokleby	Great Slave	2019	1st term
R. J. Simpson	Hay River North	2015	2nd term
Rocky Simpson Sr.	Hay River South	2019	1st term
Diane Archie	Inuvik Boot Lake	2019	1st term
Lesa Semmler	Inuvik Twin Lakes	2019	1st term
Caitlin Cleveland	Kam Lake	2019	1st term
Frederick Blake	Mackenzie Delta	2011	3rd term
Jackson Lafferty (until June 4, 2021)	Monfwi	2005	5th term
Jane Weyallon Armstrong (since July 28, 2021)	Monfwi	2021	1st term
Shane Thompson	Nahendeh	2015	2nd term
Jackie Jacobson	Nunakput	2007, 2019	3rd term*
Caroline Cochrane	Range Lake	2015	2nd term
Paulie Chinna	Sahtu	2019	1st term
Frieda Martselos	Thebacha	2019	1st term
Steve Norn (until November 23, 2021)	Tu Nedhé-Wiilideh	2019	1st term
Richard Edjericon (since February 9, 2022)	Tu Nedhé-Wiilideh	2022	1st term
Julie Green	Yellowknife Centre	2015	2nd term
Rylund Johnson	Yellowknife North	2019	1st term
Caroline Wawzonek	Yellowknife South	2019	1st term

== Executive Council of the Northwest Territories ==
Ministers at present are as follows (current as of July 2021):

Portfolio	Minister
Premier Minister of Executive and Indigenous Affairs Minister responsible for the COVID -19 Coordinating Secretariat	Caroline Cochrane
Deputy Premier Minister of Infrastructure Minister responsible for the Northwest Territories Power Corporation	Diane Archie
Minister responsible for the Northwest Territories Housing Corporation Minister responsible for Homelessness Minister responsible for the Public Utilities Board Minister responsible for the Workers’ Safety and Compensation Commission	Paulie Chinna
Government House Leader Minister of Education, Culture and Employment Minister of Justice	R. J. Simpson
Minister of Municipal and Community Affairs Minister of Environment and Natural Resources Minister of Lands Minister Responsible for Youth	Shane Thompson
Minister of Finance Minister of Industry, Tourism and Investment Minister responsible for the Business Development and Investment Corporation Minister responsible for the Status of Women	Caroline Wawzonek
Minister of Health and Social Services Minister responsible for Persons with Disabilities Minister responsible for Seniors	Julie Green
