= 18th Northwest Territories Legislative Assembly =

Canadian regional assembly

- Consensus parliament
- Nov. 23, 2015 – Sep. 2, 2019

Parliament leaders
- Premier: Bob McLeod; October 26, 2011 – October 24, 2019

Legislative Assembly
- Speaker of the Assembly: Jackson Lafferty; November 23, 2015 – October 24, 2019
- Members: 19 seats

Sovereign
- Monarch: Elizabeth II of Canada; February 6, 1952 – September 8, 2022
- Commissioner: George Tuccaro; May 12, 2010 – May 10, 2016
- Margaret Thom; September 18, 2017 – May 14, 2024
← 17th	→ 19th

The 18th Northwest Territories Legislative Assembly in Canada was established by the results of the 2015 Northwest Territories general election on November 23, 2015. It was the 26th sitting of the Assembly in the territory's history. The territory has fixed election date legislation that ensures elections are held every four years on the first Monday in October.

== Membership ==
Member	District	First elected / previously elected	No. of terms
Michael Nadli	Deh Cho	2011	2nd term
Kevin O'Reilly	Frame Lake	2015	1st term
Glen Abernethy	Great Slave	2007	3rd term
R. J. Simpson	Hay River North	2015	1st term
Wally Schumann	Hay River South	2015	1st term
Alfred Moses	Inuvik Boot Lake	2011	2nd term
Robert C. McLeod	Inuvik Twin Lakes	2004	4th term
Kieron Testart	Kam Lake	2015	1st term
Frederick Blake	Mackenzie Delta	2011	2nd term
Jackson Lafferty	Monfwi	2005	4th term
Shane Thompson	Nahendeh	2015	1st term
Herbert Nakimayak	Nunakput	2015	1st term
Caroline Cochrane	Range Lake	2015	1st term
Daniel McNeely	Sahtu	2015	1st term
Louis Sebert	Thebacha	2015	1st term
Tom Beaulieu	Tu Nedhé-Wiilideh	2007	3rd term
Julie Green	Yellowknife Centre	2015	1st term
Cory Vanthuyne	Yellowknife North	2015	1st term
Robert R. "Bob" McLeod	Yellowknife South	2007	3rd term

== Executive Council of the Northwest Territories ==
The Executive Council has six Ministers and a Premier who were elected by the normal members of the Assembly.

Portfolio	Minister
Premier Minister of Executive and Indigenous Affairs	Bob McLeod
Deputy premier Minister of Finance Minister of Environment and Natural Rexources	Robert C. McLeod
Minister of Health and Social Services Minister Responsible for the Workers' Safety and Compensation Commission Minister Responsible for the Public Utilities Board Minister Responsible for Persons with Disabilities Minister Responsible for Seniors Government House Leader	Glen Abernethy
Minister of Education, Culture and Employment, Minister Responsible for Youth	Alfred Moses
Minister of Municipal and Community Affairs Minister Responsible for the Northwest Territories Housing Corporation Minister Responsible for the Status of Women Minister Responsible for Addressing Homelessness	Caroline Cochrane
Minister of Industry, Tourism and Investment Minister of Infrastructure	Wally Schumann
Minister of Lands Minister of Justice Minister Responsible for the Northwest Territories Power Corporation Minister Responsible for Public Engagement and Transparency	Louis Sebert
