= Women in Canadian provincial and territorial legislatures =

This is a list of women who are currently members of the provincial and territorial Legislative Assemblies in Canada.

== Rankings ==
To date, no provincial or territorial legislative assembly has achieved exact gender parity between women and men. The Northwest Territories had near-parity after its 2019 election, which saw the election of 9 women out of a total of 19 MLAs. In 2021, a by-election resulted in NWT gaining a majority of women representatives, a first for Canada. The province with the highest percentage of women in their legislature is British Columbia at 56.3%.

Women currently represent 35.3 per cent (273 out of 772) of all provincial and territorial legislators across Canada as a whole.

Rank	Province or territory	Electoral districts	Women representatives	Percentage	Latest election
1	Northwest Territories	19	8	42.1	2023
2	Quebec	125	58	46.4	2022
3	British Columbia	93	48	51.6	2024
4	Yukon	21	11	52.3	2025
5	Ontario	124	47	37.9	2022
6	Nova Scotia	55	19	34.5	2021
7	Alberta	87	32	36.8	2023
8	Manitoba	57	19	33.3	2023
9	Saskatchewan	61	24	39.3	2024
10	New Brunswick	49	14	28.6	2020
11	Nunavut	22	6	27.2	2021
12	Prince Edward Island	27	7	25.9	2019
13	Newfoundland and Labrador	40	9	22.5	2025

== Representatives ==
=== Alberta ===
Representative	Party	Electoral district	Notes
Nagwan Al-Guneid	NDP	Calgary-Glenmore	
Jackie Armstrong Homeniuk	United Conservative	Fort Saskatchewan-Vegreville	
Diana Batten	NDP	Calgary-Acadia	
Jodi Calahoo Stonehouse	NDP	Edmonton-Rutherford	
Amanda Chapman	NDP	Calgary-Beddington	
Sarah Elmeligi	NDP	Banff-Kananaskis	
Janet Eremenko	NDP	Calgary-Currie	
Tanya Fir	United Conservative	Calgary-Peigan	Minister of Arts, Culture, and the Status of Women
Kathleen Ganley	NDP	Calgary-Mountain View	
Nicole Goehring	NDP	Edmonton-Castle Downs	
Christina Gray	NDP	Edmonton-Mill Woods	
Julia Hayter	NDP	Calgary-Edgemont	
Sarah Hoffman	NDP	Edmonton-Glenora	
Rhiannon Hoyle	NDP	Edmonton-South	
Janis Irwin	NDP	Edmonton-Highlands-Norwood	
Jennifer Johnson	United Conservative	Lacombe-Ponoka	
Chantelle de Jonge	United Conservative	Chestermere-Strathmore	
Adriana LaGrange	United Conservative	Red Deer-North	Minister of Hospital and Surgical Services
Jackie Lovely	United Conservative	Camrose	
Luanne Metz	NDP	Calgary-Varsity	
Rakhi Pancholi	NDP	Edmonton-Whitemud	
Chelsae Petrovic	United Conservative	Livingstone-Macleod	Parliamentary Secretary for Health Workforce Engagement
Angela Pitt	United Conservative	Airdrie	
Marie Renaud	NDP	St. Albert	
Rajan Sawhney	United Conservative	Calgary-North East	Minister of Indigenous Relations
Tara Sawyer	United Conservative	Olds-Didsbury-Three Hills	Minister of Agriculture and Irrigation
Lori Sigurdson	NDP	Edmonton-Riverview	
Danielle Smith	United Conservative	Brooks-Medicine Hat	Premier of Alberta
Heather Sweet	NDP	Edmonton-Manning	
Lizette Tejada	NDP	Calgary-Klein	
Peggy Wright	NDP	Edmonton-Beverly-Clareview	

=== British Columbia ===
Representative	Party	Electoral district	Notes
Brittny Anderson	NDP	Kootenay Central	Minister of State for Local Governments and Rural Communities
Tara Armstrong	Independent	Kelowna-Lake Country-Coldstream	
Reah Arora	NDP	Burnaby East	
Brenda Bailey	NDP	Vancouver-South Granville	Minister of Jobs, Economic Development and Innovation
Lisa Beare	NDP	Maple Ridge-Pitt Meadows	Minister of Education and Child Care
Rosalyn Bird	CentreBC	Prince George-Valemount	
Jennifer Blatherwick	NDP	Coquitlam-Maillardville	Parliamentary Secretary for Gender Equity
Lynne Block	Conservative	West Vancouver-Capilano	
Amelia Boultbee	NDP	Penticton-Summerland	
Christine Boyle	NDP	Vancouver-Little Mountain	Minister of Housing and Municipal Affairs
Dallas Brodie	OneBC	Vancouver-Quilchena	Interim Leader of OneBC
Susie Chant	NDP	North Vancouver-Seymour	Parliamentary Secretary for Seniors’ Services and Long-Term Care
Tamara Davidson	NDP	North Coast-Haida Gwaii	Minister of Environment and Parks
Sunita Dhir	NDP	Vancouver-Langara	Parliamentary Secretary for International Credentials
Mable Elmore	NDP	Vancouver-Kensington	
Dana Gibson	NDP	Oak Bay-Gordon Head	Minister of Citizens' Services
Kelly Greene	NDP	Richmond-Steveston	Minister of Emergency Management and Climate Readiness
Sharon Hartwell	Conservative	Bulkley Valley-Stikine	
Linda Hepner	Independent	Surrey-Serpentine River	
Stephanie Higginson	NDP	Ladysmith-Oceanside	
Anne Kang	NDP	Burnaby-Deer Lake	Minister of Tourism, Arts, Culture and Sport
Anna Kindy	Conservative	North Island	
Nina Krieger	NDP	Victoria-Swan Lake	Minister of Public Safety and Solicitor General
Kristina Loewen	Conservative	Kelowna Centre	
Grace Lore	NDP	Victoria-Beacon Hill	Minister without portfolio
Bowinn Ma	NDP	North Vancouver-Lonsdale	Minister of Infrastructure
Heather Maahs	Conservative	Chilliwack North	Leader of the official opposition and Parliamentary leader of the Conservative Party of British Columbia
Sheila Malcolmson	NDP	Nanaimo-Gabriola Island	Minister of Social Development and Poverty Reduction
Josie Osborne	NDP	Mid Island-Pacific Rim	Minister of Finance
Lana Popham	NDP	Saanich South	Minister of Agriculture and Food
Claire Rattée	Independent	Skeena	
Darlene Rotchford	NDP	Esquimalt-Colwood	Parliamentary Secretary for Labour
Janet Routledge	NDP	Burnaby North	Government Whip of the Legislative Assembly of British Columbia
Harwinder Sandhu	NDP	Vernon-Lumby	Parliamentary Secretary for Agriculture
Amna Shah	NDP	Surrey City Centre	Parliamentary Secretary for Anti-Racism Initiatives and Parliamentary Secretary for Mental Health and Addictions
Niki Sharma	NDP	Vancouver-Hastings	Deputy Premier and Attorney General of British Columbia
Elenore Sturko	CentreBC	Surrey-Cloverdale	
Jessie Sunner	NDP	Surrey-Newton	Minister of Post-Secondary Education and Future Skills
Jody Toor	Conservative	Langley-Willowbrook	
Debra Toporowski	NDP	Cowichan Valley	Parliamentary Secretary for Rural Health
Misty Van Popta	Conservative	Langley-Walnut Grove	
Áʼa꞉líya Warbus	CentreBC	Chilliwack-Cultus Lake	
Teresa Wat	CentreBC	Richmond Centre	
Jennifer Whiteside	NDP	New Westminster-Coquitlam	Minister of Labour
Jodie Wickens	NDP	Coquitlam-Burke Mountain	Minister of Children and Family Development
Donegal Wilson	CentreBC	Boundary-Similkameen	

=== Manitoba ===
Representative	Party	Electoral district	Notes
Jodie Byram	Progressive Conservative	Agassiz	
Renée Cable	New Democrat	Southdale	Minister of Advanced Education and Training
Jennifer Chen	New Democrat	Fort Richmond	
Carla Compton	New Democrat	Tuxedo	Premier's Advisor on Nursing Culture & Safety, Co-chair Health Advisory Table
Kathleen Cook	Progressive Conservative	Roblin	
Shannon Corbett	New Democrat	Transcona	
Billie Cross	New Democrat	Seine River	
Jelynn Dela Cruz	New Democrat	Radisson	Legislative Assistant to the Minister of Health, Seniors and Long Term Care
Jennifer Flett	New Democrat	The Pas-Kameesak	
Nahanni Fontaine	New Democrat	St. Johns	Minister of Families
Carrie Hiebert	Progressive Conservative	Morden-Winkler	
Nellie Kennedy	New Democrat	Assiniboia	Minister of Sport, Culture, Heritage and Tourism
Cindy Lamoureux	Liberal	Burrows	Parliamentary and Deputy Leader of the Manitoba Liberal Party
Malaya Marcelino	New Democrat	Notre Dame	Minister of Labour and Immigration
Lisa Naylor	New Democrat	Wolseley	Minister of Transportation and Infrastructure
Colleen Robbins	Progressive Conservative	Spruce Woods	
Tracy Schmidt	New Democrat	Rossmere	Minister of Education and Early Childhood Learning
Rachelle Schott	New Democrat	Kildonan-River East	Assistant Deputy Speaker of the Legislative Assembly of Manitoba
Bernadette Smith	New Democrat	Point Douglas	Minister of Housing, Addictions, and Homelessness
Lauren Stone	Progressive Conservative	Midland	

=== New Brunswick ===
Representative	Party	Electoral district	Notes
Kathy Bockus	Progressive Conservative	Saint Croix	
Lyne Chantal Boudreau	Liberal	Champdoré-Irishtown	Minister responsible for Seniors and Minister responsible for Women’s Equality
Michelle Conroy	Progressive Conservative	Miramichi East	
Kate Elman Wilcott	Liberal	Saint John West-Lancaster	
Susan Holt	Liberal	Fredericton South-Silverwood	Premier and Minister responsible for Official Languages
Claire Johnson	Liberal	Moncton South	Minister of Education and Early Childhood Development
Margaret Johnson	Progressive Conservative	Carleton-Victoria	
Francine Landry	Liberal	Madawaska les Lacs-Edmundston	Speaker of the Legislative Assembly of New Brunswick
Cindy Miles	Liberal	Hanwell-New Maryland	Minister of Social Development and Minister responsible for the Economic and Social Inclusion Corporation
Megan Mitton	Green	Memramcook-Tantramar	Co-deputy leader of the Green Party of New Brunswick
Tammy Scott-Wallace	Progressive Conservative	Sussex-Fundy-St. Martins	
Tania Sodhi	Liberal	Moncton Northwest	
Isabelle Thériault	Liberal	Caraquet	Minister of Tourism, Heritage and Culture
Alyson Townsend	Liberal	Rothesay	Minister of Post-Secondary Education, Training and Labour Minister responsible for the Research and Productivity Council Minister responsible for the Regulatory Accountability and Reporting Act
Natacha Vautour	Liberal	Dieppe-Memramcook	
Mary Wilson	Progressive Conservative	Oromocto-Lincoln-Fredericton	
Sherry Wilson	Progressive Conservative	Albert-Riverview	Dean of the Legislative Assembly of New Brunswick

=== Newfoundland and Labrador ===
Representative	Party	Electoral district	Notes
Andrea Barbour	Progressive Conservative	St. Barbe-L'Anse aux Meadows	Minister of Environment, Conservation and Climate Change
Helen Conway-Ottenheimer	Progressive Conservative	Harbour Main	Minister of Justice, Public Safety, and Attorney General
Lisa Dempster	Liberal	Cartwright-L'Anse au Clair	
Lela Evans	Progressive Conservative	Torngat Mountains	Minister of Labrador Affairs, Minister of Indigenous Affairs and Reconciliation, Minister of Women and Gender Equality
Sherry Gambin-Walsh	Liberal	Placentia and St. Mary's	
Pam Parsons	Liberal	Harbour Grace-Port de Grave	
Sarah Stoodley	Liberal	Mount Scio	Minister of Digital Government and Service NL
Lucy Stoyles	Liberal	Mount Pearl North	

=== Northwest Territories ===
Representative	Party	Electoral district	Notes
Caitlin Cleveland	Independent	Kam Lake	Minister of Education, Culture and Employment Minister of Industry, Tourism and Investment
Lucy Kuptana	Independent	Nunakput	Minister Responsible for Housing NWT Minister Responsible for the Status of Women
Shauna Morgan	Independent	Yellowknife North	
Kate Reid	Independent	Great Slave	
Lesa Semmler	Independent	Inuvik Twin Lakes	Minister of Health and Social Services
Caroline Wawzonek	Independent	Yellowknife South	Deputy Premier of the Northwest Territories Minister of Finance Minister of Infrastructure Minister Responsible for the Northwest Territories Power Corporation
Jane Weyallon Armstrong	Independent	Monfwi	
Sheryl Yakeleya	Independent	Deh Cho	

=== Nova Scotia ===
Representative	Party	Electoral district	Notes
Barbara Adams	Progressive Conservative	Eastern Passage	Deputy Premier of Nova Scotia
Jill Balser	Progressive Conservative	Digby-Annapolis	
Danielle Barkhouse	Progressive Conservative	Chester-St. Margaret's	Speaker of the Nova Scotia House of Assembly
Claudia Chender	New Democrat	Dartmouth South	Leader of the New Democratic Party
Kendra Coombes	New Democrat	Cape Breton Centre-Whitney Pier	
Susan Corkum-Greek	Progressive Conservative	Lunenburg	
Becky Druhan	Liberal	Lunenburg West	
Krista Gallagher	New Democrat	Halifax Chebucto	
Twila Grosse	Progressive Conservative	Preston	
Lina Hamid	New Democrat	Fairview-Clayton Park	
Suzy Hansen	New Democrat	Halifax Needham	
Lisa Lachance	New Democrat	Halifax Citadel-Sable Island	
Susan Leblanc	New Democrat	Dartmouth North	
Leah Martin	Progressive Conservative	Cole Harbour	
Kim Masland	Progressive Conservative	Queens-Shelburne	Minister of Emergency Management
Melissa Sheehy-Richard	Progressive Conservative	Hants West	
Elizabeth Smith-McCrossin	Independent	Cumberland North	
Dianne Timmins	Progressive Conservative	Victoria-The Lakes	
Michelle Thompson	Progressive Conservative	Antigonish	
Julie Vanexan	Progressive Conservative	Kings South	

=== Nunavut ===
Representative	Party	Electoral district	Notes
Hannah Angootealuk	Independent	Aivilik	
Janet Brewster	Independent	Iqaluit-Sinaa	Minister of Health Minister responsible for Suicide Prevention
Gwen Healey Akearok	Independent	Iqaluit-Manirajak	
Cecile Nelvana Lyall	Independent	Netsilik	Minister of Family Services Minister of Qulliq Energy Corporation Minister responsible for Status of Women Minister responsible for Homelessness Minister responsible for Poverty Reduction
Annie Tattuinee	Independent	Rankin Inlet South	Minister of Human Resources Minister of Workers' Safety and Compensation Commission

=== Ontario ===
Representative	Party	Electoral district	Notes
Teresa Armstrong	New Democrat	London—Fanshawe	
Jessica Bell	New Democrat	University—Rosedale	
Stephanie Bowman	Liberal	Don Valley West	
Bobbi Ann Brady	Independent	Haldimand—Norfolk	
Aislinn Clancy	Green	Kitchener Centre	Deputy leader of the Green Party of Ontario
Lucille Collard	Liberal	Ottawa—Vanier	
Michelle Cooper	Progressive Conservative	Eglinton–Lawrence	Associate Minister of Mental Health and Addictions
Jess Dixon	Progressive Conservative	Kitchener South—Hespeler	
Jill Dunlop	Progressive Conservative	Simcoe North	Minister of Emergency Preparedness and response
Lee Fairclough	Liberal	Etobicoke–Lakeshore	
Catherine Fife	NDP	Waterloo	
Jennifer French	NDP	Oshawa	
Dawn Gallagher Murphy	Progressive Conservative	Newmarket—Aurora	
France Gélinas	NDP	Nickel Belt	
Lisa Gretzky	NDP	Windsor West	
Alexa Gilmour	NDP	Parkdale–High Park	
Silvia Gualtieri	Progressive Conservative	Missisauga East–Cooksville	
Andrea Hazell	Liberal	Scarborough—Guildwood	
Sylvia Jones	Progressive Conservative	Dufferin—Caledon	Deputy Premier of Ontario Minister of Health
Andrea Khanjin	Progressive Conservative	Barrie—Innisfil	
Natalia Kusendova	Progressive Conservative	Mississauga Centre	Minister of Long-Term Care; Minister of Francophone Affairs
Susan Lahey	Progressive Conservative	York–Simcoe	
Robin Lennox	New Democrat	Hamilton Centre	
Karen McCrimmon	Liberal	Kanata—Carleton	
Catherine McKenney	New Democrat	Ottawa Centre	
Mary-Margaret McMahon	Liberal	Beaches—East York	
Chandra Pasma	New Democratic	Ottawa West—Nepean	
Natalie Pierre	Progressive Conservative	Burlington	
Peggy Sattler	New Democrat	London West	
Laurie Scott	Progressive Conservative	Haliburton—Kawartha Lakes—Brock	Minister of Labour
Fatima Shaban	New Democrat	Scarborough Southwest	
Sandy Shaw	New Democrat	Hamilton East—Ancaster—Dundas	
Donna Skelly	Progressive Conservative	Flamborough—Glanbrook	43rd Speaker of the Legislative Assembly of Ontario
Laura Smith	Progressive Conservative	Thornhill	
Stephanie Smyth	Liberal	Toronto–St. Paul's	
Jennie Stevens	New Democrat	St. Catharines	
Marit Stiles	New Democrat	Davenport	
Kinga Surma	Progressive Conservative	Etobicoke Centre	President of the Treasury Board of Ontario
Nina Tangri	Progressive Conservative	Mississauga—Streetsville	Associate Minister of Small Business
Lisa Thompson	Progressive Conservative	Huron—Bruce	Minister of Rural Affairs
Effie Triantafilopoulos	Progressive Conservative	Oakville North—Burlington	Parliamentary Assistant to the Minister of Economic Development, Job Creation and Trade
Lise Vaugeois	New Democratic	Thunder Bay—Superior North	
Daisy Wai	Progressive Conservative	Richmond Hill	Parliamentary Assistant to the Minister of Seniors and Accessibility
Charmaine Williams	Progressive Conservative	Brampton Centre	Associate Minister of Women's Social and Economic Opportunity of Ontario
Kristyn Wong-Tam	New Democrat	Toronto Centre	

=== Prince Edward Island ===
Representative	Party	Electoral district	Notes
Karla Bernard	Green	Charlottetown-Victoria Park	
Jill Burridge	Progressive Conservative	Stratford-Keppoch	Minister of Finance, Affordability, and Energy
Darlene Compton	Progressive Conservative	Belfast-Murray River	Minister of Land and Environment
Susie Dillon	Progressive Conservative	Charlottetown-Belvedere	
Barb Ramsay	Progressive Conservative	Summerside-South Drive	
Jenn Redmond	Progressive Conservative	Mermaid-Stratford	
Carolyn Simpson	Liberal	Charlottetown-Hillsborough Park	
Tayte Willows	Green	Cornwall-Meadowbank	

=== Quebec ===
Representative	Party	Electoral district	Notes
Suzanne Blais	Coalition Avenir Québec	Abitibi-Ouest	
Karine Boivin Roy	Coalition Avenir Québec	Anjou–Louis-Riel	
Stéphanie Lachance	Coalition Avenir Québec	Bellechasse	
Caroline Proulx	Coalition Avenir Québec	Berthier	Minister of Tourism
France-Élaine Duranceau	Coalition Avenir Québec	Bertrand	Minister of Housing
Catherine Blouin	Coalition Avenir Québec	Bonaventure	
Madwa-Nika Cadet	Liberal	Bourassa-Sauvé	
Isabelle Charest	Coalition Avenir Québec	Brome-Missisquoi	Minister Responsible for Sports, Recreation and the Outdoors
Sonia LeBel	Coalition Avenir Québec	Champlain	Minister Responsible for Government Administration
Kariane Bourassa	Coalition Avenir Québec	Charlevoix–Côte-de-Beaupré	
Marie-Belle Gendron	Coalition Avenir Québec	Châteauguay	
Andrée Laforest	Coalition Avenir Québec	Chicoutimi	Minister of Municipal Affairs
Sona Lakhoyan Olivier	Liberal	Chomedey	
Martine Biron	Coalition Avenir Québec	Chutes-de-la-Chaudière	Minister for the Status of Women and Minister of International Relations and La Francophonie
Elisabeth Prass	Liberal	D'Arcy-McGee	
Kateri Champagne Jourdain	Coalition Avenir Québec	Duplessis	Minister of Employment
Alice Abou-Khalil	Coalition Avenir Québec	Fabre	
Suzanne Tremblay	Coalition Avenir Québec	Hull	
Carole Mallette	Coalition Avenir Québec	Huntingdon	
Audrey Bogemans	Coalition Avenir Québec	Iberville	
Filomena Rotiroti	Liberal	Jeanne-Mance–Viger	
Joëlle Boutin	Coalition Avenir Québec	Jean-Talon	
Chantale Jeannotte	Coalition Avenir Québec	Labelle	
Linda Caron	Liberal	La Pinière	
Isabelle Poulet	Coalition Avenir Québec	Laporte	
Céline Haytayan	Coalition Avenir Québec	Laval-des-Rapides	
Marie-Louise Tardif	Coalition Avenir Québec	Laviolette–Saint-Maurice	
Lucie Lecours	Coalition Avenir Québec	Les Plaines	
Isabelle Lecours	Coalition Avenir Québec	Lotbinière-Frontenac	
Geneviève Guilbault	Coalition Avenir Québec	Louis-Hébert	Minister of Transport and Sustainable Mobility and Deputy Premier
Shirley Dorismond	Coalition Avenir Québec	Marie-Victorin	
Ruba Ghazal	Québec solidaire	Mercier	
Virginie Dufour	Liberal	Mille-Îles	
Sylvie D'Amours	Coalition Avenir Québec	Mirabel	
Nathalie Roy	Coalition Avenir Québec	Montarville	President of the National Assembly
Michelle Setlakwe	Liberal	Mont-Royal–Outremont	
Désirée McGraw	Liberal	Notre-Dame-de-Grâce	
Chantal Rouleau	Coalition Avenir Québec	Pointe-aux-Trembles	Minister Responsible for Social Solidarity and Community Action
Sonia Bélanger	Coalition Avenir Québec	Prévost	Minister for Health and Seniors
Pascale Déry	Coalition Avenir Québec	Repentigny	Minister of Higher Education
Maïté Blanchette Vézina	Coalition Avenir Québec	Rimouski	Minister of Natural Resources and Forests
Amélie Dionne	Coalition Avenir Québec	Rivière-du-Loup–Témiscouata	
Brigitte Garceau	Liberal	Robert-Baldwin	
Nancy Guillemette	Coalition Avenir Québec	Roberval	
Geneviève Hébert	Coalition Avenir Québec	Saint-François	
Chantal Soucy	Coalition Avenir Québec	Saint-Hyacinthe	
Marwah Rizqy	Liberal	Saint-Laurent	
Manon Massé	Québec solidaire	Sainte-Marie–Saint-Jacques	Co-Spokesperson for Québec solidaire
Christine Fréchette	Coalition Avenir Québec	Sanguinet	Minister of Immigration, Francization and Integration
Christine Labrie	Québec solidaire	Sherbrooke	
Marilyne Picard	Coalition Avenir Québec	Soulanges	
Marie-Claude Nichols	Liberal (Until Oct.27 2022)	Vaudreuil	
Marie-Claude Nichols	Independent	Vaudreuil	
Suzanne Roy	Coalition Avenir Québec	Verchères	Minister of the Family
Alejandra Zaga Mendez	Québec solidaire	Verdun	
Valérie Schmaltz	Coalition Avenir Québec	Vimont	
Jennifer Maccarone	Liberal	Westmount–Saint-Louis	

=== Saskatchewan ===
Representative	Party	Electoral district	Notes
Carla Beck	New Democrat	Regina Lakeview	
Lori Carr	Saskatchewan Party	Estevan-Big Muddy	Minister of Social Services
Meara Conway	New Democrat	Regina Elphinstone-Centre	
Bronwyn Eyre	Saskatchewan Party	Saskatoon Stonebridge-Dakota	Minister of Energy and Resources
Donna Harpauer	Saskatchewan Party	Humboldt	Deputy Premier and Minister of Finance
Lisa Lambert	Saskatchewan Party	Saskatoon Churchill-Wildwood	
Vicki Mowat	New Democrat	Saskatoon Fairview	
Joan Pratchler	New Democrat	Regina Rochdale	
Betty Nippi-Albright	New Democrat	Saskatoon Centre	
Erika Ritchie	New Democrat	Saskatoon Nutana	
Alana Ross	Saskatchewan Party	Prince Albert Northcote	
Laura Ross	Saskatchewan Party	Regina Qu'Appelle Valley	Minister of Parks, Culture and Sport
Nicole Sarauer	New Democrat	Regina Douglas Park	
Aleana Young	New Democrat	Regina University	
Colleen Young	Saskatchewan Party	Lloydminster	

=== Yukon ===
Representative	Party	Electoral district	Notes
Doris Anderson	Yukon Party	Porter Creek North	
Cory Bellmore	Yukon Party	Mayo-Tatchun	
Linda Benoit	Yukon Party	Whistle Bend South	
Yvonne Clarke	Yukon Party	Porter Creek Centre	
Jen Gehmair	Yukon Party	Marsh Lake-Mount Lorne-Golden Horn	
Carmen Gustafson	Yukon New Democratic Party	Riverdale North	
Laura Lang	Yukon Party	Whitehorse West	
Debra-Leigh Reti	Yukon Liberal Party	Vuntut Gwitchin	
Patti McLeod	Yukon Liberal Party	Watson Lake	
Linda Moen	Yukon New Democratic Party	Mountainview	
Kate White	Yukon New Democratic Party	Takhini-Kopper King	Leader of the New Democratic Party
