= 17th Northwest Territories Legislative Assembly =

17th Assembly

Type
- Type: Unicameral

History
- Established: October 3, 2011
- Disbanded: November 23, 2015
- Preceded by: 16th Northwest Territories Legislative Assembly
- Succeeded by: 18th Northwest Territories Legislative Assembly

Leadership
- Premier: Bob McLeod
- Seats: 19

Elections
- Last election: 2011

Meeting place
- Yellowknife

The 17th Northwest Territories Legislative Assembly was established by the results of the 2011 Northwest Territories general election on October 3, 2011. It was the 25th sitting of the Assembly in the territory's history. The Assembly was dissolved in 2015.

== Term extension debate ==
Members voted on Motion 16-17(5) introduced by Hay River North MLA Jane Groenewegen to extend the term of the Assembly to five years starting with the 18th Legislature to match every other provincial and territorial jurisdiction in Canada. This change was approved by the federal government. In addition they voted to ask for permission of the federal government to extend the current mandate of the Assembly to postpone the 23rd general election and sit until October 2016. The reason given was to avoid having an election during federal election and municipal elections in the territory scheduled at the same time, claiming voters will be fatigued. The decision by council prompted a petition calling for the Assembly to be dissolved early.

The motion passed the legislature on a recorded vote with 11 members for and 7 against with one member absent

Motion 16-17(5) vote
For	Against	Absent
Groenewegen, Yakeleya, Menicoche, Blake, Beaulieu, Abernethy, Miltenberger, McLeod – Yellowknife South, Lafferty, Ramsay, McLeod – Inuvik Twin Lakes	Dolynny, Bouchard, Nadli, Hawkins, Bisaro, Moses, Bromley	Jacobson

== Number of MLAs in the capital city ==
Currently, 7 of 19 of the Assembly's representatives are from the capital city of Yellowknife. The City of Yellowknife is launching a lawsuit to increase the number of Yellowknife-based MLAs to something more closely in line with the city's roughly 50 per cent of the NWT population. However, some say increasing the number of Yellowknife-based MLAs would weaken the territories on the whole.

== Membership ==
A total of nineteen members were returned to council in the 2011 general election. Three members were acclaimed to office on September 9, 2011 with the rest in contested districts being returned on October 3, 2011.

Member	District	First elected / previously elected	No. of terms
Michael Nadli	Deh Cho	2011	1st term
Wendy Bisaro	Frame Lake	2007	2nd term
Glen Abernethy	Great Slave	2007	2nd term
Robert Bouchard	Hay River North	2011	1st term
Jane Groenewegen	Hay River South	1995	5th term
Dave Ramsay	Kam Lake	2003	3rd term
Alfred Moses	Inuvik Boot Lake	2011	1st term
Robert McLeod	Inuvik Twin Lakes	2004	3rd term
Frederick Blake, Jr.	Mackenzie Delta	2011	1st term
Jackson Lafferty	Monfwi	2005	3rd term
Kevin Menicoche	Nahendeh	2003	3rd term
Jackie Jacobson	Nunakput	2007	2nd term
Daryl Dolynny	Range Lake	2011	1st term
Norman Yakeleya	Sahtu	2003	3rd term
Michael Miltenberger	Thebacha	1995	5th term
Tom Beaulieu	Tu Nedhe	2007	2nd term
Bob Bromley	Weledeh	2007	2nd term
Robert Hawkins	Yellowknife Centre	2003	3rd term
Bob McLeod	Yellowknife South	2007	2nd term

=== Standings and cabinet changes ===
Caucus	2011	
Caucus	Sep. 9	Oct. 3
Executive Council	0	
Regular members	3	19
Speaker	0	
Vacant	16	0
Total	3	19

Date	Member	District	Reason
September 9, 2011	Tom Beaulieu	Tu Nedhe	Acclaimed in the general election
September 9, 2011	Bob McLeod	Yellowknife South	Acclaimed in the general election
September 9, 2011	Robert McLeod	Inuvik Twin Lakes	Acclaimed in the general election
October 3, 2011	See List of Members		Election day of the 22nd general election
