= 2015 Northwest Territories general election =

- November 23, 2015

19 seats in the Legislative Assembly of the Northwest Territories
- Turnout: 43.59%
- Popular vote by riding. As Northwest Territories elections are on a non-partisan basis, all candidates run as independents. The Monfwi riding (black) was elected by acclamation due to the riding being uncontested.
Premier before election
Bob McLeod
Premier after election
Bob McLeod

The 2015 Northwest Territories general election was held November 23, 2015. Under the territory's fixed election date legislation, the election was supposed to be held on October 5, 2015, however, since the federal election date of October 19, 2015, overlapped with that date, the N.W.T. government moved the date of the territorial election. The election selected 19 members of the Legislative Assembly of the Northwest Territories.

== Term extension debate ==
In March 2014 the current Legislative Assembly voted to extend its term from four years to five. The act will need to be approved by the federal government. The reason given for postponing the election was to avoid voter fatigue, with municipal elections and the next federal election scheduled for October 2015. The decision by the assembly has prompted a petition calling for the Legislature to be dissolved early.

== Boundary changes ==
A new election map was implemented this election, the first since the territory was split in 1999. The report of the commission recommended three proposals calling for 18, 19 or 21 MLA's. A 19-member proposal was adopted by the assembly in May 2014, under which the only major change was the dissolution of the former districts of Weledeh and Tu Nedhe; under the new boundaries, the urban Yellowknife portion of Weledeh was reconstituted as the district of Yellowknife North, while the rural communities in the riding were merged with Tu Nedhe to create the new district of Tu Nedhé-Wiilideh. Apart from that change, all of the other 17 existing districts were retained with only minor boundary adjustments.

The Yellowknife City Council objected to the changes since the city was allocated only seven of 19 districts, despite containing around half the NWT population. The council asked the NWT Minister of Justice Dave Ramsay to refer the issue to the Supreme Court of the Northwest Territories for a constitutional opinion but this was rejected.

== Results ==
Official results by district are shown below. Incumbents are indicated by an asterisk (*).

Turnout by riding

Deh Cho
| Name | Vote | % |
| Michael Nadli* | 190 | 40.6 |
| Ronald Bonnetrouge | 172 | 36.8 |
| Gregory Nyuli | 66 | 14.1 |
| Lyle Fabian | 40 | 8.5 |
| Total Valid Ballots | 468 | 100% |
| Turnout | | 61% |

Frame Lake
| Name | Vote | % |
| Kevin O'Reilly | 156 | 28.6 |
| Jan Fullerton | 141 | 25.8 |
| David Wasylciw | 132 | 24.2 |
| Roy Erasmus | 117 | 21.4 |
| Total Valid Ballots | 546 | 100% |
| Turnout | | 28% |

Great Slave
| Name | Vote | % |
| Glen Abernethy* | 511 | 79.1 |
| Chris Clarke | 135 | 20.9 |
| Total Valid Ballots | 646 | 100% |
| Turnout | | 27% |

Hay River North
| Name | Vote | % |
| R. J. Simpson | 375 | 52.7 |
| Robert Bouchard* | 252 | 35.4 |
| Karen Felker | 84 | 11.8 |
| Total Valid Ballots | 711 | 100% |
| Turnout | | 52% |

Hay River South
| Name | Vote | % |
| Wally Schumann | 372 | 47.2 |
| Jane Groenewegen* | 274 | 34.8 |
| Brian Willows | 142 | 18.0 |
| Total Valid Ballots | 788 | 100% |
| Turnout | | 57% |

Inuvik Boot Lake
| Name | Vote | % |
| Alfred Moses* | 366 | 88.6 |
| Desmond Z. Loreen | 47 | 11.4 |
| Total Valid Ballots | 413 | 100% |
| Turnout | | 43% |

Inuvik Twin Lakes
| Name | Vote | % |
| Robert C. McLeod* | 262 | 60.1 |
| Jimmy Kalinek | 174 | 39.9 |
| Total Valid Ballots | 436 | 100% |
| Turnout | | 43% |

Kam Lake
| Name | Vote | % |
| Kieron Testart | 280 | 58.1 |
| Dave Ramsay* | 202 | 41.9 |
| Total Valid Ballots | 482 | 100% |
| Turnout | | 25% |

Mackenzie Delta
| Name | Vote | % |
| Frederick Blake, Jr.* | 313 | 48.0 |
| William Firth | 137 | 21.0 |
| Norman Snowshoe | 116 | 17.8 |
| David Krutko | 86 | 13.2 |
| Total Valid Ballots | 652 | 100% |
| Turnout | | 66% |

Monfwi; Lafferty elected by acclamation
| Name | Vote | % |
| Jackson Lafferty* | N/A | N/A |
| Total Valid Ballots | N/A | N/A |

Nahendeh
| Name | Vote | % |
| Shane Thompson | 292 | 29.4 |
| Rosemary Gill | 202 | 20.4 |
| Randy Sibbetson | 198 | 20.0 |
| Kevin Menicoche* | 137 | 13.8 |
| Deneze Nakehk'o | 128 | 12.9 |
| Arnold Hope | 23 | 2.3 |
| Dennis Nelner | 12 | 1.2 |
| Total Valid Ballots | 992 | 100% |
| Turnout | | 60% |

Nunakput
| Name | Vote | % |
| Herbert Nakimayak | 229 | 30.8 |
| Jackie Jacobson* | 225 | 30.2 |
| Ethel-Jean Gruben | 174 | 23.4 |
| John Stuart Jr. | 81 | 10.9 |
| Robert Kuptana | 35 | 4.7 |
| Total Valid Ballots | 744 | 100% |
| Turnout | | 76% |

Range Lake
| Name | Vote | % |
| Caroline Cochrane | 333 | 50.4 |
| Daryl Dolynny* | 328 | 49.6 |
| Total Valid Ballots | 661 | 100% |
| Turnout | | 32% |

Sahtu
| Name | Vote | % |
| Daniel McNeely | 271 | 29.6 |
| Yvonne Doolittle | 242 | 26.4 |
| Judy Tutcho | 229 | 25.0 |
| Paul Andrew | 175 | 19.1 |
| Total Valid Ballots | 917 | 100% |
| Turnout | | 58% |

Thebacha
| Name | Vote | % |
| Louis Sebert | 401 | 42.8 |
| Michael Miltenberger* | 363 | 38.7 |
| Don Jaque | 173 | 18.5 |
| Total Valid Ballots | 937 | 100% |
| Turnout | | 51% |

Tu Nedhé-Wiilideh
| Name | Vote | % |
| Tom Beaulieu** | 410 | 71.1 |
| Richard Edjericon | 177 | 28.9 |
| Total Valid Ballots | 587 | 100% |
| Turnout | | 71% |

**Beaulieu was previously member for the abolished district of Weledeh

Yellowknife Centre
| Name | Vote | % |
| Julie Green | 470 | 54.7 |
| Robert Hawkins* | 389 | 45.3 |
| Total Valid Ballots | 859 | 100% |
| Turnout | | 38% |

Yellowknife North
| Name | Vote | % |
| Cory Vanthuyne | 392 | 35.8 |
| Dan Wong | 376 | 34.3 |
| Ben Nind | 189 | 17.2 |
| Edwin Castillo | 127 | 11.6 |
| Sean Erasmus | 12 | 1.1 |
| Total Valid Ballots | 1,096 | 100% |
| Turnout | | 45% |

Yellowknife South
| Name | Vote | % |
| Bob McLeod* | 485 | 70.0 |
| Nigit'stil Jessica Norbert | 179 | 25.8 |
| Samuel Roland | 29 | 4.2 |
| Total Valid Ballots | 693 | 100% |
| Turnout | | 33% |

== Analysis ==
Chris Windeyer, writing for CBC News, wrote that the defeat of eight incumbents in a 19-seat legislature could be seen as reflecting a strong desire for change, particularly pointing to the defeat of Finance Minister Michael Miltenberger, who unsuccessfully tried to win a sixth term. Windeyer also noted there was no increase in female MLAs in this election, with only two winning, and wrote that the re-election of Michael Nadli, who broke his wife's wrist during his last term, "does not say great things about the place of women in N.W.T. politics."
