= 2019 Northwest Territories general election =

- October 1, 2019

All seats in the Legislative Assembly of the Northwest Territories
- The map on the left shows the total winning vote by riding. The map on the right shows the incumbency status for each MLA after the election. As Northwest Territories elections are on a non-partisan basis, all candidates run as independents.
Premier before election
Bob McLeod
Premier after election
Caroline Cochrane

The 2019 Northwest Territories general election was held on October 1, 2019. Nineteen members were elected to the Legislative Assembly of the Northwest Territories.

== Election ==
On September 6, 2019, Premier Bob McLeod announced that he would not seek re-election.

Four other incumbents announced they would not seek re-election, including three of seven cabinet ministers — Health Minister Glen Abernethy, Housing Minister Alfred Moses, and Finance Minister Robert C. McLeod.

Not counting the three acclaimed MLAs (RJ Simpson, Frederick Blake Jr, and Jackson Lafferty), only four incumbent members out of 11 running won reelection: Kevin O'Reilly, Julie Green, Shane Thompson, and Caroline Cochrane. Cochrane was the only cabinet minister from the 18th Assembly to return to the legislature. Three ridings, including Cochrane's, were subject to automatic recounts due to the narrow margins of victory; however, all of the recounts upheld the original results.

The election represented a historic breakthrough for women in Northwest Territories politics. The territory had just two female MLAs in the previous assembly, ranking last among all of Canada's elected legislatures for female representation; in the 2019 election, however, the territory elected nine women, representing nearly half of the 19-seat legislature— the highest percentage of female representation in any Canadian legislature.

== New premier and cabinet ==
Given that the territory operates on a consensus government system, MLAs elected on October 1 chose the new premier in the first session of the 19th Assembly. Four MLAs — Jackson Lafferty, R. J. Simpson, Caroline Cochrane and Frieda Martselos — indicated that they would stand for the premiership; Cochrane was selected as the premier on October 24.

Simpson, Paulie Chinna, Katrina Nokleby, Diane Thom, Shane Thompson and Caroline Wawzonek were selected as the cabinet members in the same session of the legislature.

== Results ==
The Legislative Assembly is run on a consensus government system, in which all MLAs sit as independents and are not organized into political parties. Note, accordingly, that colours in the following charts are used solely to indicate candidate status, not political party affiliations.

=== Statistics ===
Reelection statistics
	Seats	Did not run again	Defeated	Reelected
All MLAs	19	5	7	7

=== Candidates ===
Candidates by district
District	Winner	Second	Third	Fourth	Fifth	Sixth	Incumbent
Deh Cho	Ronald Bonnetrouge; 283	Michael Nadli; 253					Michael Nadli
Frame Lake	Kevin O'Reilly; 357	Dave Ramsay; 346					Kevin O'Reilly
Great Slave	Katrina Nokleby; 454	Patrick Scott; 389					Glen Abernethy
Hay River North	R. J. Simpson (Jr.) acclaimed						R. J. Simpson
Hay River South	Rocky Simpson Sr. 350	Wally Schumann; 322					Wally Schumann
Inuvik Boot Lake	Diane Thom; 239	Eugene Rees; 179	Desmond Loreen; 94	Jimmy Kalinek; 47			Alfred Moses
Inuvik Twin Lakes	Lesa Semmler; 470	Sallie Ross; 106	Donald Hendrick; 41				Robert C. McLeod
Kam Lake	Caitlin Cleveland; 262	Robert Hawkins; 224	Kieron Testart; 220	Rommel Silverio; 125	Abdullah Al-Mahamud; 63	Cherish Winsor; 61	Kieron Testart
Mackenzie Delta	Frederick Blake Jr. acclaimed						Frederick Blake Jr.
Monfwi	Jackson Lafferty acclaimed						Jackson Lafferty
Nahendeh	Shane Thompson; 536	Mike Drake; 190	Randy Sibbeston; 111	Eric Menicoche; 40			Shane Thompson
Nunakput	Jackie Jacobson; 231	Herbert Nakimayak; 143	Annie Steen; 127	Holly Campbell; 107	Sheila Nasogaluak; 101	Alisa Blake; 48	Herbert Nakimayak
Range Lake	Caroline Cochrane; 439	Hughie Graham; 421					Caroline Cochrane
Sahtu	Paulie Chinna; 309	Daniel McNeely; 287	Caroline Yukon; 135	Wilfred McNeely Jr. 120			Daniel McNeely
Thebacha	Frieda Martselos; 504	Denise Yuhas; 454	Don Jaque; 139	Louis Sebert; 70			Louis Sebert
Tu Nedhé-Wiilideh	Steve Norn; 206	Richard Edjericon; 130	Lila Fraser Erasmus; 117	Paul Betsina; 103	Nadine Delorme; 9		Tom Beaulieu
Yellowknife Centre	Julie Green; 291	Arlene Hache; 260	Niels Konge; 185	Thom Jarvis; 103			Julie Green
Yellowknife North	Rylund Johnson; 501	Cory Vanthuyne; 496	Jan Vallillee; 380				Cory Vanthuyne
Yellowknife South	Caroline Wawzonek; 687	Gaeleen Macpherson; 299					Bob McLeod
