= 2003 Northwest Territories general election =

← 1999	November 24, 2003	2007 →

19 seats in the Legislative Assembly of the Northwest Territories
Premier before election
Stephen Kakfwi
Premier after election
Joe Handley

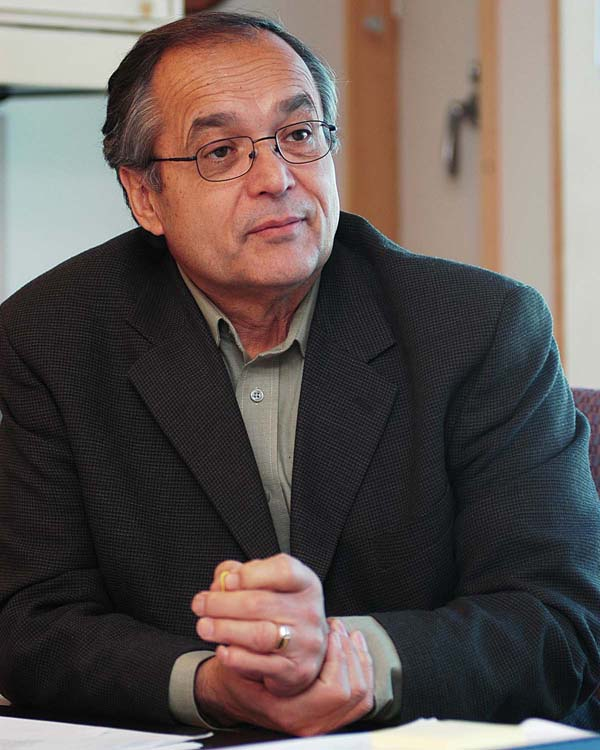
Joe Handley, in 2006.

The 2003 Northwest Territories general election was held on November 24, 2003, to elect the 19 members of the Legislative Assembly.

The election was called on October 27. Premier Stephen Kakfwi had previously chosen not to run.

The territory operates on a consensus government system with no political parties; the premier is subsequently chosen by and from the Members of the Legislative Assembly (MLAs). There were 21,474 registered voters at the time of the election.

== Issues ==
Issues at the election included:

- devolution of federal powers,
- the method of choosing the premier,
- the alcohol abuse and suicide problems,
- shortage of medical professionals and affordable housing;
- school crowding,
- the $85-million deficit;
- sharing of profits from mining and oil and gas development.

== Results ==
Elections were held in 14 of the 19 electoral districts. The following five districts acclaimed their MLA:

- Hay River North: Paul Delorey
- Inuvik Boot Lake: Floyd Roland
- Mackenzie Delta: David Krutko
- Weledeh: Joe Handley
- Yellowknife South: Brendan Bell

The following is a list of the districts with their winning candidates.

District	Elected	Percentage	Other candidates
Deh Cho	Michael McLeod	51.04%	Michael Nadli
Frame Lake	Charles Dent	62.96%	David W. Wind
Great Slave	Bill Braden	64.52%	Karen Hamre
Hay River South	Jane Groenewegen	44.56%	Ann M. Lobb, Duncan McNeill, Harvey Werner
Inuvik Twin Lakes	Roger Allen	54.53%	Ken Smith, Bobby Van Bridger, Clarence G. Wood
Kam Lake	Dave Ramsay	49.53%	Bill Aho, Steve Petersen
Nahendeh	Kevin A. Menicoche	34.48%	Walter Blondin, Rita Cli, Yanny Leo Cordero, John Hazenberg, Arnold Hope, Shane A. Thompson, Kathy Tsetso
North Slave	Henry Zoe	42.27%	Nora P. Doig, Leon Lafferty
Nunakput	Calvin P. Pokiak	52.5%	Vince Steen
Range Lake	Sandy Lee	80.56%	Francis H. Chang
Sahtu	Norman Yakeleya	45.59%	Lucy Jackson, Frank T'Seleie, Larry M. Tourangeau, Judi M. Tutcho
Thebacha	Michael Miltenberger	65.36%	Don Tourangeau
Tu Nedhe	Bobby J. Villeneuve	23.71%	Maurice E. Boucher, Felix Lockhart, James Marlowe, Steven Nitah, Robert Sayine, Wilfred M. Simon
Yellowknife Centre	Robert Hawkins	26.61%	Bob Haywood, Don Kindt, Annemieke Mulders, Lena Pedersen (Pederson), Daniel A. Wong, Liz Wyman

Results (CBC News)

Joe Handley was acclaimed premier by the legislature on December 10, 2003. His two prospective opponents, Roger Allen and Floyd Roland, had announced that they would not run against him.

== Miscellaneous ==
In an unusual occurrence, the riding of Inuvik Twin Lakes experienced 150% voter turnout. 356 people were registered to vote in that riding, but an additional 187 showed up at the ballot box. A resident of a riding eligible but not registered to vote may register on the spot by presenting a proof of residency.
