= 2011 Northwest Territories general election =

- October 3, 2011

19 seats in the Legislative Assembly of the Northwest Territories
Premier before election
Floyd Roland
Premier after election
Bob McLeod

The 2011 Northwest Territories general election was held on October 3, 2011. Nineteen members were returned to the 17th Legislative Assembly from single member districts conducted under first-past-the-post voting system.

The territory operates on a consensus government system with no political parties; the premier is subsequently chosen by and from the Members of the Legislative Assembly (MLAs).

Three incumbent MLAs faced no challengers and were acclaimed back into office in their districts. Five new MLAs were elected, although only one defeated an incumbent; all of the other four won in open seats where the incumbent MLA did not run for re-election.

== New Premier and cabinet ==
After the election the elected members of the Assembly will gather to choose the 12th Premier of the territories. Incumbent Premier Floyd Roland has chosen not to stand for re-election in his district. To date no Premier has served two full terms in the Northwest Territories since Frederick Haultain, who won his second term in 1902.

After the members of the legislature have elected the new Premier, the MLAs elect the cabinet ministers from the remaining Assembly members and the Premier then assigns portfolios to the new ministers.

== Election summary ==
Election summary	# of candidates		Popular vote	
Election summary	Incumbent	New	#	%
Elected candidates	11	5	6,193	52.66%
Acclaimed candidates	3	0		
Defeated candidates	1	27	5,567	47.34%
Total	47		11,760	100%
Voter Turnout %			Rejected Ballots	

== Districts and candidates ==
District	Winner	Second	Third	Fourth	Fifth	Incumbent
Deh Cho	Michael Nadli; 394	Michael McLeod; 226				**Michael McLeod**
Frame Lake	Wendy Bisaro; 328	Duff Spence; 240	Bernard LeBlanc; 30			Wendy Bisaro
Great Slave	Glen Abernethy; 476	Patrick Scott; 266				Glen Abernethy
Hay River North	Robert Bouchard; 363	Roy Courtoreille; 265	Beatrice Lepine; 133			**Paul Delorey**†
Hay River South	Jane Groenewegen; 465	Marc Miltenberger; 339				Jane Groenewegen
Inuvik Boot Lake	Alfred Moses; 216	Chris Larocque; 211	Grant Gowans; 63	Paul Voudrach; 18		**Floyd Roland**†
Inuvik Twin Lakes	Robert McLeod; Acclaimed					**Robert McLeod**
Kam Lake	Dave Ramsay; 356	Darwin Rudkevitch; 118	Victor Mercredi; 45	Bryan Sutherland; 28		Dave Ramsay
Mackenzie Delta	Frederick Blake, Jr. 190	Taig Connell; 150	Eugene Pascal; 127	Mary Clark; 89	Glenna Hansen; 66	David Krutko†
Monfwi	Jackson Lafferty; 739	Bertha Rabesca Zoe; 600				**Jackson Lafferty**
Nahendeh	Kevin Menicoche; 431	Bertha Norwegian; 127				Kevin Menicoche
Nunakput	Jackie Jacobson; 312	Eddie Dillon; 199				Jackie Jacobson
Range Lake	Daryl Dolynny; 277	David Wasylciw; 210	Beaton Mackenzie; 167	Norman Smith; 64		Vacant
Sahtu	Norman Yakeleya; 463	Rocky Norwegian; 312				Norman Yakeleya
Thebacha	Michael Miltenberger; 526	Peter Martselos; 426	Jeannie Marie-Jewell; 263			**Michael Miltenberger**
Tu Nedhe	Tom Beaulieu; Acclaimed					Tom Beaulieu
Weledeh	Bob Bromley; 624	Mark Bogan; 79				Bob Bromley
Yellowknife Centre	Robert Hawkins; 427	Arlene Hache; 312				Robert Hawkins
Yellowknife South	Bob McLeod; Acclaimed					**Bob McLeod**

- Note: Bold denotes a member of the cabinet and speaker of the Assembly, the Premier is denoted in bold italic.
