= Dave Ramsay =

Canadian businessman and politician (born 1970)

Member of the Legislative Assembly of the Northwest Territories
- In office November 24, 2003 – November 23, 2015
- Preceded by: Tony Whitford
- Succeeded by: Kieron Testart
- Constituency: Kam Lake

Personal details
- Born: March 18, 1970 (age 56) Saint John, New Brunswick, Canada
- Party: Independent

Dave Ramsay (born March 18, 1970) is a Yellowknife businessman and politician.

== Early life ==
Ramsay was born March 18, 1970 in Saint John, New Brunswick.

== Political career ==
Ramsay first ran for a seat in the Northwest Territories Legislative Assembly in the 1999 Northwest Territories general election in the electoral district of Range Lake. He was defeated by candidate Sandy Lee finishing a close second. He would run again in the 2003 Northwest Territories general election this time in the electoral district of Kam Lake. He defeated two other candidates with nearly 50% of the vote to win his first term in office.

Ramsay was reelected to a second term in the 2007 general election. He won a third term in the 2011 election and was chosen for cabinet on the formation of the 17th Assembly, serving as Minister of Transport.
