= 2023 Northwest Territories general election =

Legislative election in Northwest Territories, Canada

- November 14, 2023

All 19 seats in the Legislative Assembly of the Northwest Territories
- Results by territorial electoral district. As Northwest Territories elections are on a non-partisan basis, all candidates run as independents.
Premier before election
Caroline Cochrane
Premier after election
R. J. Simpson

The 2023 Northwest Territories general election was held on November 14, 2023. Nineteen members were elected to the 20th Northwest Territories Legislative Assembly. The Assembly is run on a consensus government system, in which all MLAs sit as independents and are not organized into political parties.

Due to the Northwest Territories wildfire evacuations in August, territorial chief election officer, Stephen Dunbar, proposed delaying the election one month to November, due to the possibility that some residents of the territory may still be displaced from their homes during the currently scheduled campaign period. Some cabinet ministers expressed support for his proposal, with the Assembly meeting on August 28 to debate rescheduling the election. The election was officially delayed from the original October 3 date to November 14, six weeks later.

On September 28, 2023, incumbent Premier Caroline Cochrane announced she would not seek re-election.

== Results ==
The Legislative Assembly is run on a consensus government system, in which all MLAs sit as independents and are not organized into political parties. Note, accordingly, that colours in the following charts are used solely to indicate candidate status, not political party affiliations.

=== Statistics ===
Reelection statistics
	Seats	Did not run	Defeated	Reelected
Cabinet	7	2	2	3
Independent	11	3	5	4
All MLAs	19	5	7	7

=== Candidates ===
2023 Northwest Territories general election: Deh Cho
Candidate	Votes	%
Sheryl Yakeleya	229	39.48
Steven Vandell	178	30.69
Ronald Bonnetrouge (I)	146	25.17
Richard C. Lafferty	27	4.66
Total votes	580	

2023 Northwest Territories general election: Frame Lake
Candidate	Votes	%
Julian Morse	209	32.91
Spencer Tracy	182	28.66
Stuart Wray	169	26.61
John Stanley	49	7.72
Deanna Cornfield	26	4.09
Total votes	635	

2023 Northwest Territories general election: Great Slave
Candidate	Votes	%
Kate Reid	263	34.79
Stacie Arden Smith	237	31.35
Katrina Nokleby (I)	197	26.06
James Lawrence	59	7.80
Total votes	756	

2023 Northwest Territories general election: Hay River North
Candidate	Votes	%
R. J. Simpson (I.C.)	398	65.57
Michael Wallington	109	17.96
Hans Wiedemann	85	14.00
Greg McMeekin	15	2.47
Total votes	607	

2023 Northwest Territories general election: Hay River South
Candidate	Votes	%
Vince McKay	282	38.63
Wally Schumann	238	32.60
Rocky Simpson Sr. (I)	210	28.77
Total votes	730	

2023 Northwest Territories general election: Inuvik Boot Lake
Candidate	Votes	%
Denny Rodgers	210	42.51
Diane Archie (I.C.)	152	30.77
Sallie Ross	132	26.72
Total votes	494	

2023 Northwest Territories general election: Inuvik Twin Lakes
Candidate	Votes	%
Lesa Semmler (I)	322	71.56
Lenora McLeod	128	28.44
Total votes	450	

2023 Northwest Territories general election: Kam Lake
Candidate	Votes
Caitlin Cleveland (I)	Acclaimed

2023 Northwest Territories general election: Mackenzie Delta
Candidate	Votes	%
George Nerysoo	233	37.04
Frederick Blake Jr. (I.S.)	220	34.98
Richard Ross Jr.	176	27.98
Total votes	629	

2023 Northwest Territories general election: Monfwi
Candidate	Votes
Jane Weyallon Armstrong (I)	Acclaimed

2023 Northwest Territories general election: Nahendeh
Candidate	Votes	%
Shane Thompson (I.C.)	326	34.50
Mavis Cli-Michaud	185	19.58
Sharon Allen	149	15.77
Hillary Deneron	149	15.77
Les Wright	115	12.17
Josh P.T. Campbell	21	2.22
Total votes	945	

2023 Northwest Territories general election: Nunakput
Candidate	Votes	%
Lucy Kuptana	340	68.14
Vince Teddy	159	31.86
Total votes	499	

2023 Northwest Territories general election: Range Lake
Candidate	Votes	%
Kieron Testart	326	55.25
Aaron Reid	155	26.27
Nicole Sok	109	18.47
Total votes	590	

2023 Northwest Territories general election: Sahtu
Candidate	Votes	%
Daniel McNeely	372	46.21
Paulie Chinna (I.C.)	226	28.07
Delphine (Dolly) Pierrot	207	25.71
Total votes	805	

2023 Northwest Territories general election: Thebacha
Candidate	Votes	%
Jay MacDonald	483	48.59
Frieda Martselos (I)	416	41.85
Connie Benwell	95	9.56
Total votes	994	

2023 Northwest Territories general election: Tu Nedhé-Wiilideh
Candidate	Votes	%
Richard Edjericon (I)	221	87.01
Nadine Delorme	33	12.99
Total votes	254	

2023 Northwest Territories general election: Yellowknife Centre
Candidate	Votes	%
Robert Hawkins	333	41.57
Matt Spence	243	30.34
Ambe Chenemu	225	28.09
Total votes	801	

2023 Northwest Territories general election: Yellowknife North
Candidate	Votes	%
Shauna Morgan	734	64.50
Bruce Valpy	350	30.76
Jon Howe	54	4.75
Total votes	1138	

2023 Northwest Territories general election: Yellowknife South
Candidate	Votes
Caroline Wawzonek (I.C.)	Acclaimed

== Analysis ==
In the election, 12 out of the 19 seats in the legislature elected new MLAs. In addition, the number of women elected to the legislature decreased, from nine in 2019 to eight.

Given that the territory operates on a consensus government system, MLAs elected on November 14 chose the new premier in the first session of the 20th Assembly on December 7, with Hay River North MLA R. J. Simpson being elected premier. Candidates included Simpson, Kieron Testart, Shane Thompson, and Caroline Wawzonek. Thompson was elected speaker the same day.

The other members elected by MLAs to cabinet were, for the north, Lucy Kuptana and Lesa Semmler; for Yellowknife, Caitlin Cleveland and Caroline Wawzonek; and for the south, Vince McKay and Jay MacDonald.
