= Lesa Semmler =

Canadian politician

Member of the Legislative Assembly of the Northwest Territories
- In office October 1, 2019 – September 17, 2026
- Preceded by: Robert C. McLeod
- Constituency: Inuvik Twin Lakes

Member of the Executive Council of the Northwest Territories
- In office December 12, 2023 – September 17, 2026

Personal details
- Born: March 27, 1976 (age 50) Yellowknife, Northwest Territories
- Party: Non-partisan (consensus government)

Lesa Semmler (born March 27, 1976) is a Canadian politician, who was elected to the Legislative Assembly of the Northwest Territories in the 2019 election. She represented the electoral district of Inuvik Twin Lakes.

Prior to her election to the legislature, she worked for the Inuvialuit Regional Corporation as their Health Navigator working on numerous health files at the local regional and national level. She was the Nurse manager prior to her work with IRC at the Inuvik Regional Hospital. She has also been an activist on the issue of missing and murdered Indigenous women, as she was raised primarily by her great-grandparents after her mother was murdered by her common law partner when she was just eight years old.

Semmler resigned on from the Legislative Assembly on September 27, 2026 to join the Inuvialuit Regional Corporation as an associate executive director. A by-election to determine her replacement will be held on November 24, 2026.

== Election results ==
2023 Northwest Territories general election: Inuvik Twin Lakes
Candidate	Votes	%
Lesa Semmler (I)	322	71.56
Lenora McLeod	128	28.44
Total votes	450	

2019 Northwest Territories general election: Inuvik Twin Lakes
Candidate	Votes
Lesa Semmler	470
Sallie Ross	106
Donald Hendrick	41
