= Robert Bouchard (Northwest Territories politician) =

Canadian politician

Member of the Legislative Assembly of the Northwest Territories
- In office October 3, 2011 – 2015
- Preceded by: Paul Delorey
- Succeeded by: R. J. Simpson
- Constituency: Hay River North

Personal details
- Born: Hay River, Northwest Territories, Canada

Robert Bouchard is a Canadian politician, who was elected to the Legislative Assembly of the Northwest Territories in the 2011 election. He represented the electoral district of Hay River North from 2011 to 2015.
