= 1999 Northwest Territories general election =

- December 6, 1999

19 seats in the Legislative Assembly of the Northwest Territories
Premier before election
Jim Antoine
Premier after election
Stephen Kakfwi

The 1999 Northwest Territories general election was held on December 6, 1999. This was the first election under the new boundaries that were created when Nunavut was carved out of the Northwest Territories. 19 members were elected, five fewer than in the previous election.

The main issues in this election were Native self-government and control over the territory's resources.

On polling day, Yellowknife was caught in an extreme blizzard that cut off-road traffic and supplies.

The election was conducted under a non-partisan rules as the government operates under consensus, and Elections N.W.T. has not recognized parties since 1905. The Western Arctic New Democratic Party, a quasi-official offshoot of the New Democratic Party of Canada, fielded candidates and published signs and campaign material, as an attempt to revive a partisan legislature. They were shut out of the election.

== Members of the Legislative Assembly elected ==
For complete electoral history, see individual districts

14th Northwest Territories Legislative Assembly
District	Member
Deh Cho	Michael McLeod
Frame Lake	Charles Dent
Great Slave	Bill Braden
Hay River North	Paul Delorey
Hay River South	Jane Groenewegen
Inuvik Boot Lake	Floyd Roland
Inuvik Twin Lakes	Roger Allen
Kam Lake	Tony Whitford
Mackenzie Delta	David Krutko
Nahendeh	Jim Antoine
North Slave	Leon Lafferty
Nunakput	Vince Steen
Range Lake	Sandy Lee
Sahtu	Stephen Kakfwi
Thebacha	Michael Miltenberger
Tu Nedhe	Steven Nitah
Weledeh	Joe Handley
Yellowknife Centre	Jake Ootes
Yellowknife South	Brendan Bell

== See also ==
- 1999 Nunavut general election
