= Bob McLeod (politician) =

Canadian politician

The Honourable Bob McLeod
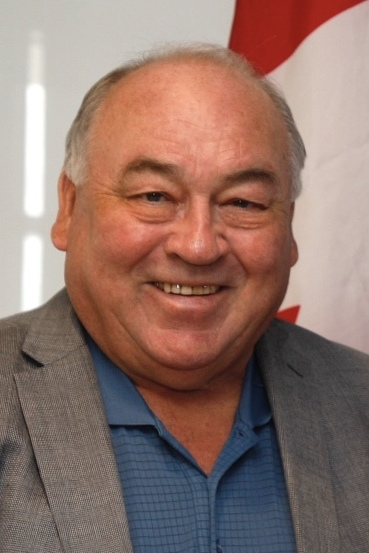

12th Premier of the Northwest Territories
- In office October 26, 2011 – October 24, 2019
- Commissioner: George Tuccaro; Margaret Thom
- Preceded by: Floyd Roland
- Succeeded by: Caroline Cochrane

Member of the Legislative Assembly of the Northwest Territories for Yellowknife South
- In office October 1, 2007 – September 2, 2019
- Preceded by: Brendan Bell
- Succeeded by: Caroline Wawzonek

Personal details
- Born: 1952 (age 73–74) Fort Providence, Northwest Territories, Canada
- Party: Independent
- Website: Bob McLeod web site

Robert R. McLeod (born 1952) is a former Canadian politician. He was a member of the Legislative Assembly of the Northwest Territories from 2007 to 2019, and served as the 12th premier of the Northwest Territories, from October 26, 2011 to October 24, 2019.

== Early life ==
Born in 1952 and raised in Fort Providence, Northwest Territories, McLeod holds a BComm from the University of Alberta and an honours diploma in administrative management from the Northern Alberta Institute of Technology. He also completed a program of national and international studies at the Royal Military College in Kingston, Ontario. He has been a federal civil servant and served in the Northwest Territories public service.

== Political career ==
McLeod ran for a seat in the Legislative Assembly of the Northwest Territories and was elected in the 2007 Northwest Territories general election. He defeated two other candidates winning over 60% of the popular vote in Yellowknife South. After the election McLeod was appointed to the cabinet with the portfolios of Human Resources, Industry, Tourism and Investment, Public Utilities Board and Energy Initiatives.

McLeod ran for re-election in the 2011 Northwest Territories general election and he was returned by acclamation to his second term. When the Territorial Leadership Committee met following the election McLeod stood for Premier and won defeating two other candidates to become the 12th Premier of the Northwest Territories. He was re-elected as both premier and MLA in the 2015 Northwest Territories general election becoming the first premier of the Northwest Territories to serve two full terms since 1902. He became the longest-serving Premier after Brad Wall stepped down on February 2, 2018.

On September 6, 2019, McLeod announced that he would not seek re-election.

His brother, Michael, was also a member of the Legislature from 1999 to 2011. He is the current Member of the Canadian Parliament representing the Northwest Territories, first elected in 2015, representing the Liberal Party of Canada.
