= Lucy Kuptana =

Canadian politician

Lucy Kuptana MLA

Member of the Legislative Assembly of the Northwest Territories
- Incumbent
- Assumed office November 14, 2023
- Preceded by: Jackie Jacobson
- Constituency: Nunakput

Member of the Executive Council of the Northwest Territories
- Incumbent
- Assumed office December 12, 2023

Personal details
- Party: non-partisan consensus government

Lucy Kuptana is a Canadian politician, who was elected to the Legislative Assembly of the Northwest Territories in the 2023 election. She represents the electoral district of Nunakput.

Prior to her election to the legislature, Kuptana was administrator of Tuktoyaktuk, and served on the board of governors of Aurora College.

== Election results ==
2023 Northwest Territories general election: Nunakput
Candidate	Votes	%
Lucy Kuptana	340	68.14
Vince Teddy	159	31.86
Total votes	499	
