= Robert Hawkins (Northwest Territories politician) =

Canadian politician

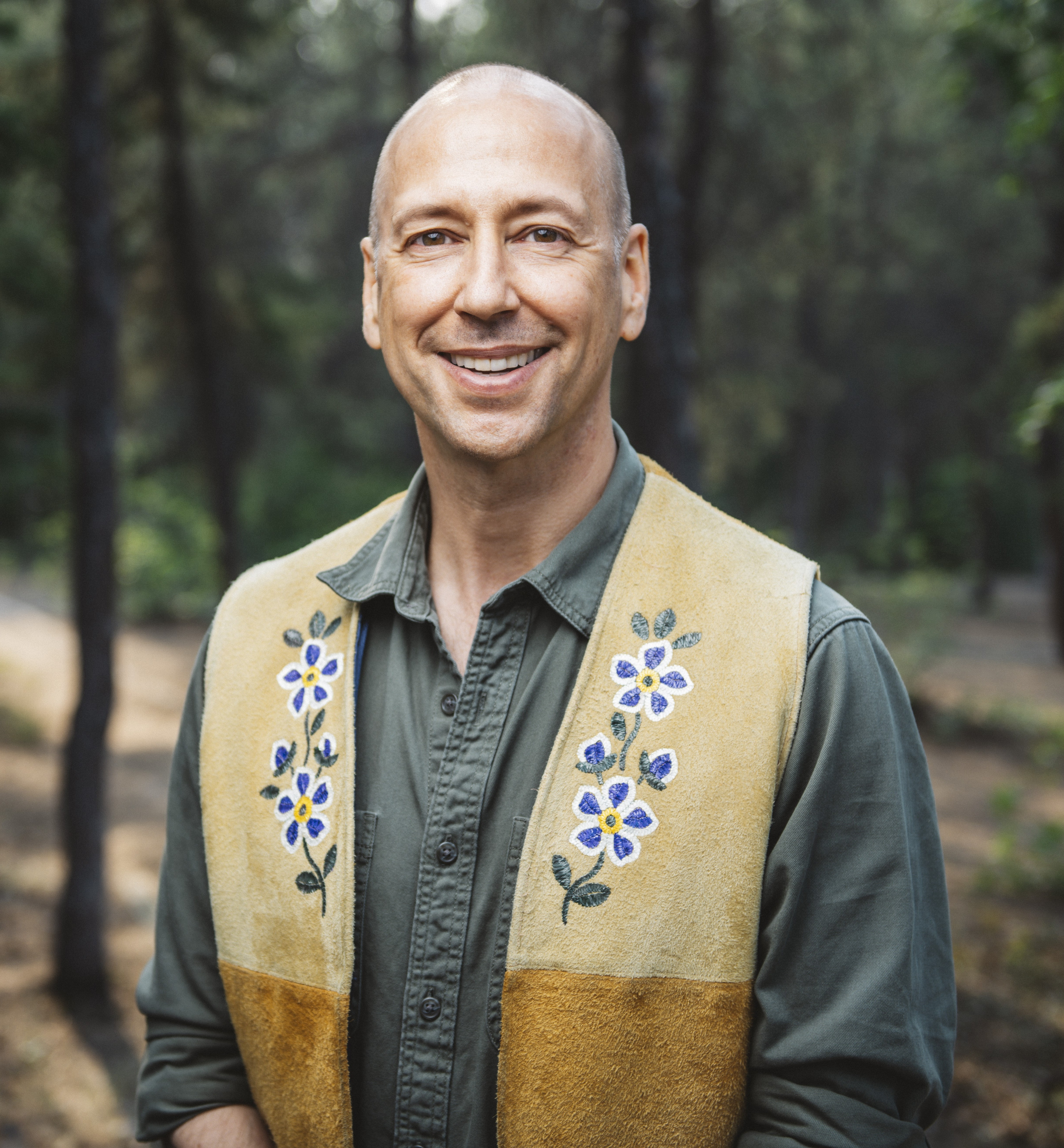
- Robert Hawkins, Member for Yellowknife Centre, Legislative Assembly of the Northwest Territories

Member of the Legislative Assembly of the Northwest Territories
- Incumbent
- Assumed office November 14, 2023
- Preceded by: Julie Green
- Constituency: Yellowknife Centre
- In office November 24, 2003 – November 23, 2015
- Preceded by: Jake Ootes
- Succeeded by: Julie Green
- Constituency: Yellowknife Centre

Personal details
- Party: non-partisan consensus government
- Occupation: engineering techniologist

Robert Hawkins is an engineering technologist and territorial politician from Northwest Territories, Canada.

== Early life ==
Born in Fredericton New Brunswick, Hawkins moved to Fort Simpson Northwest Territories in 1977 as a child. He then moved to Yellowknife, Northwest Territories in 1987 to finish high school at Sir John Franklin High School where he lived at an Indian Residential School, Akaitcho Hall. He attended his post secondary education at SAIT Polytechnic in Calgary, Alberta. Hawkins began his political career when he was elected as a city councillor for Yellowknife City Council (2000-2003). In 2003 he sought election to the territorial legislature, and was elected as the Member for Yellowknife Centre from 2003-2015.

== Political career ==
Hawkins was first elected to the Northwest Territories Legislature winning the Yellowknife Centre electoral district in the 2003 Northwest Territories general election. He defeated 6 other candidates to take the sought after seat. In 2007, Hawkins pursued re-election and won again with almost 50% of the popular vote, and approximately 20% more than his closest competitor. 2007 Northwest Territories general election. In 2019, Hawkins finished second of six candidates.

On November 14, 2023, Hawkins was once again elected to the Northwest Territories Legislature, the 20th Assembly, making this his 4th term as an MLA.

=== Election results ===
2023 Northwest Territories general election: Yellowknife Centre
Candidate	Votes	%
Robert Hawkins	333	41.57
Matt Spence	243	30.34
Ambe Chenemu	225	28.09
Total votes	801	

2019 Northwest Territories general election: Kam Lake
Candidate	Votes
Caitlin Cleveland	262
Robert Hawkins	224
Kieron Testart (I)	220
Rommel Silverio	125
Abdullah Al-Mahamud	63
Cherish Winsor	61

2015 Northwest Territories general election: Yellowknife Centre
Candidate	Votes	%
Julie Green	491	55.1%
Robert Hawkins	400	44.9%

2011 Northwest Territories general election: Yellowknife Centre
Candidate	Votes
Robert Hawkins	427
Arlene Hache	312

2007 Northwest Territories general election: Yellowknife Centre
Candidate	Votes	%
Robert Hawkins	430	46.09%
Sue Glowach	258	27.65%
Ben McDonald	204	21.86%
Bryan Sutherland	29	3.11%
Total valid ballots / Turnout	61.34%	
Rejected ballots	12	
Source(s) "Official Voting Results 2007 General Election" (PDF). Elections NWT. Archived from the original (PDF) on 11 April 2008.

2003 Northwest Territories general election: Yellowknife Centre
Candidate	Votes	%
Robert Hawkins	207	26.61%
Annemieke Mulders	167	21.47%
Don Kindt	38	17.74%
Liz Wyman	130	16.71%
Daniel A. Wong	73	9.38%
Bob Haywood	53	6.81%
Lena Pedersen	10	1.29%
Total valid ballots / turnout	1,263	61.69%
Rejected ballots	3	
Source(s) "Official Voting Results 2003 General Election" (PDF). Elections NWT. Archived from the original (PDF) on 11 April 2008.
