= Caroline Wawzonek =

Canadian politician

Caroline Wawzonek MLA
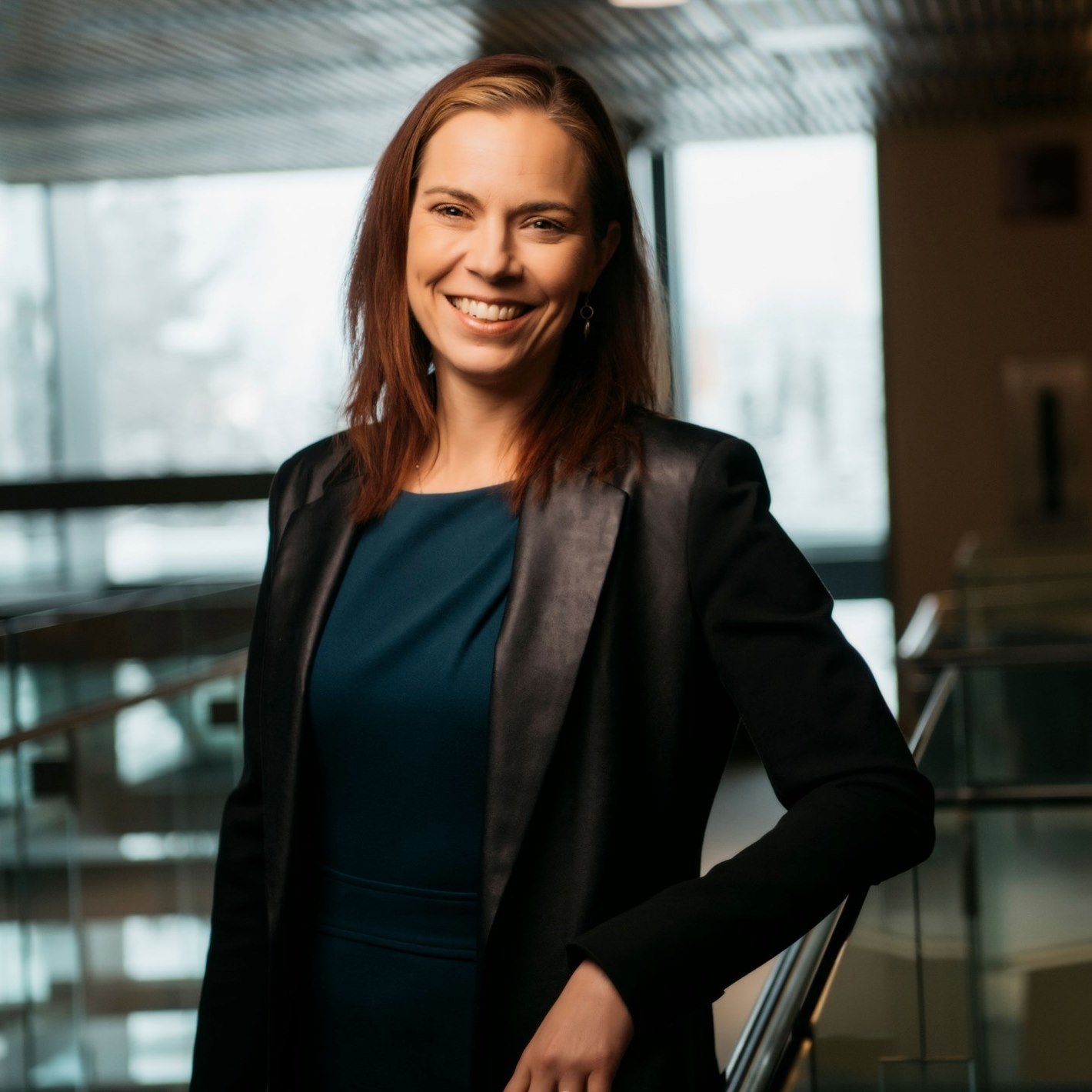
- Wawzonek in 2021

Deputy Premier of the Northwest Territories Minister of Finance Minister of Infrastructure
- Incumbent
- Assumed office December 2023
- Premier: R.J. Simpson
- Preceded by: Diane Archie

Member of the Legislative Assembly of the Northwest Territories
- Incumbent
- Assumed office October 1, 2019
- Preceded by: Bob McLeod
- Constituency: Yellowknife South

Personal details
- Party: non-partisan consensus government

Caroline Wawzonek is a Canadian politician, who was elected to the Legislative Assembly of the Northwest Territories in the 2019 election. She represents the electoral district of Yellowknife South, and was elected to Premier Caroline Cochrane's cabinet by the new cohort of territorial MLAs on October 24, 2019.

After being acclaimed to the 20th Legislative Assembly in 2023, Wawzonek returned to the Executive Council as Deputy Premier, Minister of Finance, Minister of Infrastructure, and the Minister Responsible for the NWT Power Corporation.

== Election results ==
2023 Northwest Territories general election: Yellowknife South
Candidate	Votes
Caroline Wawzonek (I.C.)	Acclaimed

2019 Northwest Territories general election: Yellowknife South
Candidate	Votes
Caroline Wawzonek	687
Gaeleen Macpherson	299
