= Executive Council of the Northwest Territories =

The Executive Council of the Northwest Territories or cabinet consists of six Ministers and a Premier elected by the 19 members of the Legislative Assembly.

Ministers at present are as follows (current as of December 2023):

Cabinet of the 20th Northwest Territories Legislative Assembly
Portfolio	Minister
Premier; Government House Leader; Minister of Executive and Indigenous Affairs; Minister of Justice	R.J. Simpson
Deputy Premier; Minister of Finance; Minister of Infrastructure; Minister Responsible for the Northwest Territories Power Corporation	Caroline Wawzonek
Minister of Education, Culture and Employment; Minister of Industry, Tourism and Investment	Caitlin Cleveland
Minister Responsible for Housing NWT; Minister Responsible for the Status of Women	Lucy Kuptana
Minister of Environment and Climate Change	Jay MacDonald
Minister of Municipal and Community Affairs; Minister Responsible for the Workers’ Safety and Compensation Commission; Minister Responsible for the Public Utilities Board	Vince McKay
Minister of Health and Social Services	Lesa Semmler
