= Kieron Testart =

Canadian politician

Kieron Testart MLA

Member of the Legislative Assembly of the Northwest Territories for Kam Lake
- In office November 23, 2015 – September 2, 2019
- Preceded by: Dave Ramsay
- Succeeded by: Caitlin Cleveland

Member of the Legislative Assembly of the Northwest Territories for Range Lake
- Incumbent
- Assumed office November 14, 2023
- Preceded by: Caroline Cochrane

Personal details
- Born: March 22, 1985 (age 41) Victoria, British Columbia, Canada
- Party: Non-partisan consensus government
- Other political affiliations: Liberal Party of Canada
- Spouse: Colleen Wellborn
- Children: 3
- Education: University of Lethbridge (BA)
- Occupation: Public Servant, Deputy Sheriff

Kieron Testart is a Canadian politician serving in the Legislative Assembly of the Northwest Territories, representing the riding of Range Lake. He is currently serving his second non-consecutive term, having first been elected in the 2015 to the riding of Kam Lake in 2015. Defeated in Kam Lake in the 2019 election by Caitlin Cleveland, Testart sought and won the open seat of Range Lake in the 2023 election four years later.

A sheriff for the territorial Department of Justice, Testart began his political career when he became a candidate for the Liberal Party of Canada nomination for Northwest Territories in the 2015 federal election. However, he ultimately withdrew from the race to endorse Michael McLeod. Shortly thereafter, he entered territorial politics and ran for Kam Lake's seat in the Legislative Assembly, defeating incumbent cabinet minister Dave Ramsay in a two-way contest.

In the 18th Assembly Testart established himself as an advocate for improved government transparency and accountability, becoming a strong critic of the Northwest Territories' consensus government system. Unlike every other province and territory in Canada, aside from Nunavut, the Northwest Territories leaves the election of its Premier and Cabinet up to MLA's through a secret ballot. Opting to not seek a cabinet post, he criticized the lack of transparency around this voting system, and breaking with tradition, he publicly disclosed his choice for Premier and Cabinet.

In 2018, Testart introduced an amendment to the territorial Elections Act to permit the introduction of party politics in the legislative assembly, but his motion received no support from other MLAs and was dropped. In 2019, he planned to organize a group of ideologically aligned MLA candidates in the 2019 Northwest Territories general election under the banner of a would-be "Liberal Democratic" slate. Ultimately, Testart would abandon the project, scrapping any electoral alliance between candidates, and remained an independent after claiming "there was a concerted campaign of disinformation" that undermined his efforts. The plan itself was prematurely leaked to the press.

In the 2019 Northwest Territories general election, Testart defended his seat against five other candidates, including former Yellowknife Centre MLA Robert Hawkins. He finished third, losing his seat to Caitlin Cleveland by 40 votes and placing just shy of second place behind Hawkins by 4. After leaving public office, Testart became the Manager of Economic Development for the Yellowknives Dene First Nation. During the 2023 Canadian Wildfires crisis that forced most communities to evacuate, he remained as an essential worker throughout the state of emergency, directing emergency operations for the First Nation communities of Dettah and Ndilǫ.

Testart returned to the Legislature after winning the electoral district of Range Lake, which became vacant after Caroline Cochrane retired after her term as Premier was complete. He defeated two other candidates, winning 55% of the vote. Testart then ran for Premier of the Northwest Territories against three other candidates. The only candidate who was not previously a cabinet minister, after Shane Thompson dropped out before the vote, Testart surprisingly overcame fellow Yellowknife area MLA Caroline Wawzonek, and placed second to Hay River North's R.J. Simpson. Forcing a head-to-head run-off ballot as no candidate initially received a majority of votes, he was ultimately defeated by Simpson on the second ballot.

== Election results ==
2023 Northwest Territories general election: Range Lake
| Candidate | Votes | % |
|---|---|---|
| Kieron Testart | 326 | 55.25 |
| Aaron Reid | 155 | 26.27 |
| Nicole Sok | 109 | 18.47 |
| Total votes | 590 | |

2019 Northwest Territories general election: Kam Lake
| Candidate | Votes |
|---|---|
| Caitlin Cleveland | 262 |
| Robert Hawkins | 224 |
| Kieron Testart (I) | 220 |
| Rommel Silverio | 125 |
| Abdullah Al-Mahamud | 63 |
| Cherish Winsor | 61 |

2015 Northwest Territories general election: Kam Lake
| Candidate | Votes | % |
|---|---|---|
| Kieron Testart | 280 | 58.1 |
| Dave Ramsay | 202 | 41.9 |
| Total valid ballots | 482 | |
| Rejected ballots | 4 | |
| Registered electors / Turnout | 1,923 | 25.3 |
Source(s) Elections NWT, 2015 Official voting Results
