= Caitlin Cleveland =

Canadian politician

Caitlin Cleveland MLA

Member of the Legislative Assembly of the Northwest Territories
- Incumbent
- Assumed office October 1, 2019
- Preceded by: Kieron Testart
- Constituency: Kam Lake

Member of the Executive Council of the Northwest Territories
- Incumbent
- Assumed office December 12, 2023

Personal details
- Party: non-partisan consensus government

Caitlin Cleveland is a Canadian politician, who was elected to the Legislative Assembly of the Northwest Territories in the 2019 election and re-elected in the 2023 general election. She represents the electoral district of Kam Lake.

As of September 29, 2024, Cleveland serves as the Minister of Industry, Tourism and Investment as well as the Minister of Education, Culture and Employment.

== Election results ==
2023 Northwest Territories general election: Kam Lake
| Candidate | Votes |
|---|---|
| Caitlin Cleveland (I) | Acclaimed |

2019 Northwest Territories general election: Kam Lake
| Candidate | Votes |
|---|---|
| Caitlin Cleveland | 262 |
| Robert Hawkins | 224 |
| Kieron Testart (I) | 220 |
| Rommel Silverio | 125 |
| Abdullah Al-Mahamud | 63 |
| Cherish Winsor | 61 |
