= Shane Thompson =

Canadian politician

The Honourable Shane Thompson MLA

16th Speaker of the Legislative Assembly of the Northwest Territories
- Incumbent
- Assumed office December 7, 2023
- Preceded by: Frederick Blake Jr.

Member of the Legislative Assembly of the Northwest Territories for Nahendeh
- Incumbent
- Assumed office November 23, 2015
- Preceded by: Kevin Menicoche

Personal details
- Born: July 11, 1963 (age 62) Hay River, Northwest Territories
- Party: non-partisan consensus government

Shane Thompson (born July 11, 1963) is a Canadian politician, who is a Member of the Legislative Assembly of the Northwest Territories for the district of Nahendeh. He was elected Speaker of the Legislative Assembly in 2023.

He was first elected in the 2015 election, and was re-elected in 2019 and again in 2023. He previously served as the Minister of Environment and Natural Resources, Minister of Lands, Minister Responsible for Youth, and Minister Responsible for Seniors.

== Political career ==
Mr. Thompson was first elected to the 18th Assembly in November 2015 and served as Chair of the Standing Committee on Social Development. Mr. Thompson was also a member of the Standing Committee on Priorities and Planning, the Standing Committee on Rules and Procedures, and the Striking Committee.

Mr. Thompson previously served two terms (three years each) as an elected official with the Fort Simpson District Education Authority, spending the last four years as the chairperson. Over the past 35 years, he has served on various community and territorial boards.

Before being elected as a Member, Mr. Thompson was employed as the Senior Sport and Recreation Coordinator with Municipal and Community Affairs (GNWT) in the Deh Cho region.

Mr. Thompson completed the Community Recreation Leaders Program at Arctic College in 1989 and is currently working on a Masters Certificate on Evaluation at the University of Victoria and Carleton University. He also completed three years toward an Education degree at the University of Alberta.

Mr. Thompson is an active volunteer with Northern Youth Aboard, CBET and Fundamental Movement, and HIGH FIVE®. He is also a past member of the Sport North Federation Board, NWT Softball, and NWTRPA, and the past president of Seven Spruce Golf Course.

Mr. Thompson is the father of seven children - five daughters and two sons – and has eight grandchildren.

He has been a Justice of the Peace since 1991.

=== Election results ===
2023 Northwest Territories general election: Nahendeh
| Candidate | Votes | % |
|---|---|---|
| Shane Thompson (I.C.) | 326 | 34.50 |
| Mavis Cli-Michaud | 185 | 19.58 |
| Sharon Allen | 149 | 15.77 |
| Hillary Deneron | 149 | 15.77 |
| Les Wright | 115 | 12.17 |
| Josh P.T. Campbell | 21 | 2.22 |
| Total votes | 945 | |

2019 Northwest Territories general election: Nahendeh
| Candidate | Votes |
|---|---|
| Shane Thompson | 536 |
| Mike Drake | 190 |
| Randy Sibbeston | 111 |
| Eric Menicoche | 40 |

2015 Northwest Territories general election: Nahendeh
| Candidate | Votes | % |
|---|---|---|
| Shane Thompson | 292 | 29.4 |
| Rosemary Gill | 202 | 20.4 |
| Randy Sibbetson | 198 | 20.0 |
| Kevin Menicoche | 137 | 13.8 |
| Deneze Nakehk'o | 128 | 12.9 |
| Arnold Hope | 23 | 2.3 |
| Dennis Nelner | 12 | 1.2 |
| Total valid ballots / Turnout | 992 | 60% |
