= Jane Weyallon Armstrong =

Canadian politician

Jane Weyallon Armstrong MLA

Member of the Legislative Assembly of the Northwest Territories
- Incumbent
- Assumed office July 27, 2021
- Preceded by: Jackson Lafferty
- Constituency: Monfwi

Personal details
- Party: non-partisan consensus government

Jane Weyallon Armstrong is a Canadian politician in the Northwest Territories. She was elected to the Legislative Assembly of the Northwest Territories in a 2021 by-election, representing the electoral district of Monfwi.

In addition to being the first female MLA for Monfwi, Weyallon Armstrong's election gave the Legislative Assembly a majority of women legislators, a first in Canada.

She lives in Behchokǫ̀. Prior to her election to the Legislative Assembly, Weyallon Armstrong was a town councillor in Behchokǫ̀. She is currently the president of the Native Women's Association of the Northwest Territories.

== Personal life ==
Weyallon Armstrong is fluent in the Tlicho language.

== Election results ==
2023 Northwest Territories general election: Monfwi
Candidate	Votes
Jane Weyallon Armstrong (I)	Acclaimed

Northwest Territories territorial by-election, July 27, 2021: Monfwi
Candidate	Votes	%
Jane Armstrong	503	54.44
Kelvin Kotchilea	252	27.27
John J. Gon	98	10.61
James Wah-Shee	71	7.68
Total valid ballots	924	
Source(s) "Unofficial Results".
