= Caroline Cochrane =

Canadian politician

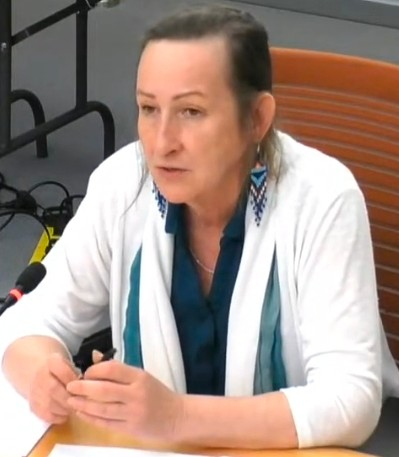

13th Premier of the Northwest Territories
- In office October 24, 2019 – December 8, 2023
- Deputy: Diane Archie
- Commissioner: Margaret Thom
- Preceded by: Bob McLeod
- Succeeded by: R. J. Simpson

Member of the Legislative Assembly of the Northwest Territories
- In office November 23, 2015 – November 14, 2023
- Preceded by: Daryl Dolynny
- Succeeded by: Kieron Testart
- Constituency: Range Lake

Personal details
- Born: December 5, 1960 (age 65) Flin Flon, Manitoba, Canada
- Party: Independent

Caroline Cochrane (formerly Caroline Cochrane-Johnson; born December 5, 1960) is a former Canadian politician, who served as the 13th premier of the Northwest Territories, from 2019 to 2023. She is the second female premier of the Northwest Territories after Nellie Cournoyea, who served from 1991 to 1995.

== Early life and career ==
Cochrane was born in Flin Flon, Manitoba, in 1960 and moved with her family to Yellowknife in 1963, where she grew up. She received a bachelor’s degree in social work from the University College of the Cariboo (now known as Thompson Rivers University or TRU) in Kamloops, British Columbia, in 1999. In 2023 Cochrane was recognized as a distinguished alumni at TRU and was awarded for her public service. She was first elected to the Legislative Assembly of the Northwest Territories in the 2015 election, representing the electoral district of Range Lake.

Prior to her election to the legislature, Cochrane was CEO of the Centre for Northern Families, a social-service agency administered by the Yellowknife Women's Society in Yellowknife.

In October 2019, Cochrane defeated three other candidates after three rounds of secret-ballot votes and was elected Premier of the Northwest Territories.

Following one term as premier and two terms as MLA, Cochrane announced her retirement from politics in September 2023 and announced that she would not seek re-election in the 2023 Northwest Territories general election.
