= R. J. Simpson =

Canadian politician

The Honourable R. J. Simpson MLA
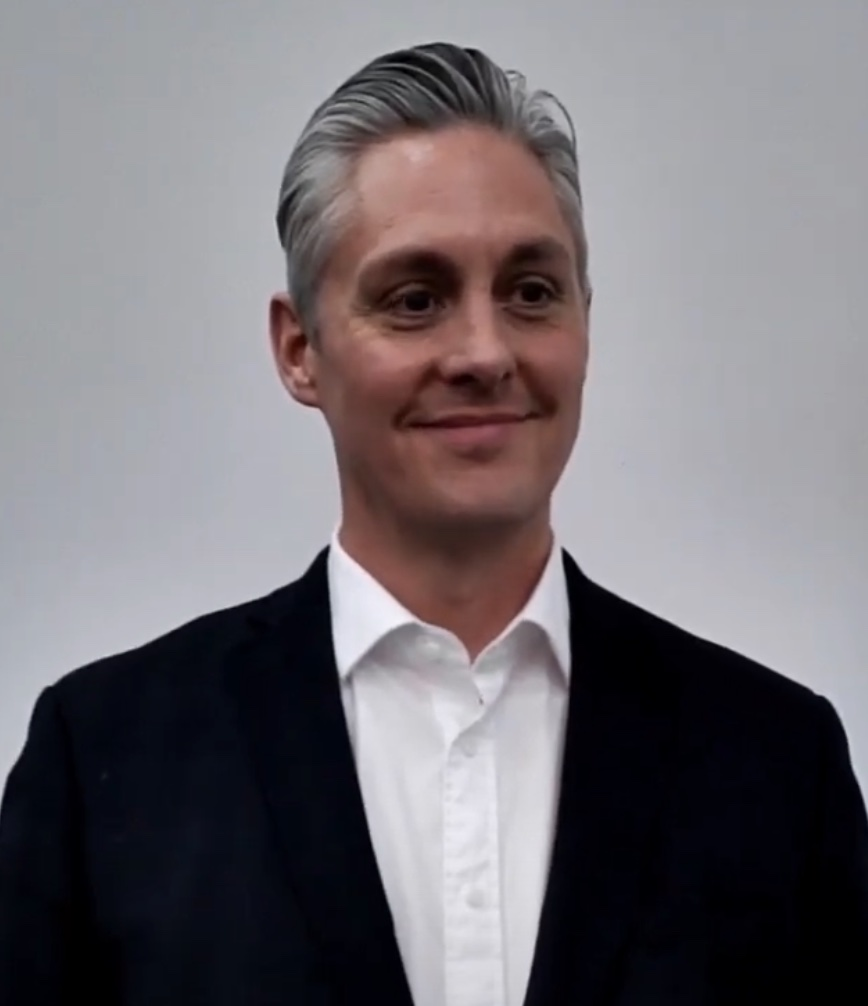
- Simpson in 2025

14th Premier of the Northwest Territories
- Incumbent
- Assumed office December 8, 2023
- Deputy: Caroline Wawzonek
- Commissioner: Margaret Thom; Gerald Kisoun
- Preceded by: Caroline Cochrane

Member of the Executive Council of the Northwest Territories
- Incumbent
- Assumed office October 24, 2019

Member of the Legislative Assembly of the Northwest Territories for Hay River North
- Incumbent
- Assumed office November 23, 2015
- Preceded by: Robert Bouchard

Personal details
- Born: Rocky Simpson; September 27, 1980 (age 46)
- Party: Independent
- Relatives: Rocky Simpson Sr. (father)
- Education: MacEwan University (BA); University of Alberta (JD)

Rocky "R. J." Simpson (born September 27, 1980) is a Canadian politician, the 14th premier of the Northwest Territories since December 2023. He was elected to the Legislative Assembly of the Northwest Territories in the 2015 election. He represents the electoral district of Hay River North.

== Political career ==
He was returned to office in the 2019 Northwest Territories general election by acclamation, as no candidates filed to run against him by the close of nominations. Before the election, he announced that he would put his name forward for Premier of the Northwest Territories when the newly elected MLAs met to select the premier and cabinet. Simpson was elected to Premier Caroline Cochrane's cabinet committee by the new territorial MLAs on October 24, 2019. His cabinet portfolio includes Minister of Education, Culture and Employment, Minister Responsible for the Public Utilities Board, and Government House Leader. In 2025, he signed agreements with other provinces and territories to reduce interprovincial trade barriers in the midst of the United States trade war with Canada.

== Personal life ==
Simpson has a Bachelor of Arts degree from MacEwan University and a law degree from the University of Alberta.

His father, Pierre (Rocky) Simpson, was also elected to the 19th Assembly as representative for Hay River South.

== Electoral history ==
2023 Northwest Territories general election: Hay River North
Candidate	Votes	%
R. J. Simpson (I.C.)	398	65.57
Michael Wallington	109	17.96
Hans Wiedemann	85	14.00
Greg McMeekin	15	2.47
Total votes	607	

2019 Northwest Territories general election: Hay River North
Candidate	Votes
R. J. Simpson	Acclaimed
Source(s) "Eight ridings to watch in the Northwest Territories' election". CBC.

2015 Northwest Territories general election: Hay River North
Candidate	Votes	%
R. J. Simpson	375	52.7
Robert Bouchard	252	35.4
Karen Felker	84	11.8
