= Hay River North =

Territorial electoral district in the Northwest Territories, Canada

Northwest Territories electoral district

Territorial electoral district
- Legislature: Legislative Assembly of the Northwest Territories
MLA
R. J. Simpson
- First contested: 1999
- Last contested: 2023

Demographics
- Census subdivision(s): Hay River

Hay River North is a territorial electoral district for the Legislative Assembly of the Northwest Territories, Canada. It is one of two districts that represent Hay River.

== Members of the Legislative Assembly (MLAs) ==
| Name | Elected | Left Office |
District created from Hay River
| Paul Delorey | 1999 | 2011 |
| Robert Bouchard | 2011 | 2015 |
| R. J. Simpson | 2015 | present |

== Election results ==
=== 2023 election ===
2023 Northwest Territories general election
| Candidate | Votes | % |
|---|---|---|
| R. J. Simpson (I.C.) | 398 | 65.57 |
| Michael Wallington | 109 | 17.96 |
| Hans Wiedemann | 85 | 14.00 |
| Greg McMeekin | 15 | 2.47 |
| Total votes | 607 | |

=== 2019 election ===
2019 Northwest Territories general election
| Candidate | Votes |
|---|---|
| R. J. Simpson | Acclaimed |
Source(s) "Eight ridings to watch in the Northwest Territories' election". CBC.

=== 2015 election ===
2015 Northwest Territories general election
| Candidate | Votes | % |
|---|---|---|
| R. J. Simpson | 375 | 52.7 |
| Robert Bouchard | 252 | 35.4 |
| Karen Felker | 84 | 11.8 |

=== 2011 election ===
2011 Northwest Territories general election
| Candidate | Votes |
|---|---|
| Robert Bouchard | 363 |
| Roy Courtoreille | 265 |
| Beatrice Lepine | 133 |

=== 2007 election ===
2007 Northwest Territories general election
| Candidate | Votes | % |
|---|---|---|
| Paul Delorey | 514 | 60.83% |
| Vince McKay | 329 | 38.93% |
| Total valid ballots / Turnout | 843 | 68.04% |
| Rejected ballots | 2 | |
Source(s) "Official Voting Results 2007 General Election" (PDF). Elections NWT. Archived from the original (PDF) on 11 April 2008.

=== 2003 election ===
2003 Northwest Territories general election
| Candidate | Votes |
| Paul Delorey | Acclaimed |

=== 1999 election ===
1999 Northwest Territories general election
| Candidate | Votes | % |
|---|---|---|
| Paul Delorey | 270 | 33.75% |
| Joanne Barnaby | 210 | 26.25% |
| Ron Courtoreille | 187 | 23.38% |
| Rod Tordoff | 63 | 7.88% |
| Jerry Morin | 30 | 3.75% |
| Julien Lefebvre | 28 | 3.50% |
| Ken Thomas | 12 | 1.49% |
| Total valid ballots / Turnout | 800 | 91.65% |
| Rejected ballots | | 1 |
Source(s) "Official Voting Results 1999 General Election" (PDF). Elections NWT. Archived from the original (PDF) on 11 April 2008.

== Notes ==
a: In the 2007 election, percentages assigned to candidates were based on the total votes cast. In prior elections the percentages were based on the valid votes.

== See also ==
- List of Northwest Territories territorial electoral districts
- Canadian provincial electoral districts
