= Yellowknife Centre =

Territorial electoral district in the Northwest Territories, Canada

Northwest Territories electoral district
- Boundaries of Yellowknife Centre in Yellowknife
- Coordinates: 62°27′03″N 114°22′37″W

Territorial electoral district
- Legislature: Legislative Assembly of the Northwest Territories
MLA
Robert Hawkins
- First contested: 1979
- Last contested: 2023

Demographics
- Census subdivision: Yellowknife

Yellowknife Centre is a territorial electoral district for the Legislative Assembly of the Northwest Territories, Canada. It is one of seven districts that represent Yellowknife.

== Members of the Legislative Assembly (MLAs) ==
Name	Elected	Left Office
Robert H. MacQuarrie	1979	1987
Brian Lewis	1987	1995
Jake Ootes	1995	2003
Robert Hawkins	2003	2015
Julie Green	2015	2023
Robert Hawkins	2023	present

== Election results ==
=== 2023 election ===
2023 Northwest Territories general election
Candidate	Votes	%
Robert Hawkins	333	41.57
Matt Spence	243	30.34
Ambe Chenemu	225	28.09
Total votes	801	

=== 2019 election ===
2019 Northwest Territories general election
Candidate	Votes
Julie Green	291
Arlene Hache	260
Niels Konge	185
Thom Jarvis	103

=== 2015 election ===
2015 Northwest Territories general election
Candidate	Votes	%
Julie Green	491	55.1%
Robert Hawkins	400	44.9%

=== 2011 election ===
2011 Northwest Territories general election
Candidate	Votes
Robert Hawkins	427
Arlene Hache	312

=== 2007 election ===
2007 Northwest Territories general election
Candidate	Votes	%
Robert Hawkins	430	46.09%
Sue Glowach	258	27.65%
Ben McDonald	204	21.86%
Bryan Sutherland	29	3.11%
Total valid ballots / Turnout	61.34%	
Rejected ballots	12	
Source(s) "Official Voting Results 2007 General Election" (PDF). Elections NWT. Archived from the original (PDF) on 11 April 2008.

=== 2003 election ===
2003 Northwest Territories general election
Candidate	Votes	%
Robert Hawkins	207	26.61%
Annemieke Mulders	167	21.47%
Don Kindt	38	17.74%
Liz Wyman	130	16.71%
Daniel A. Wong	73	9.38%
Bob Haywood	53	6.81%
Lena Pedersen	10	1.29%
Total valid ballots / turnout	1,263	61.69%
Rejected ballots	3	
Source(s) "Official Voting Results 2003 General Election" (PDF). Elections NWT. Archived from the original (PDF) on 11 April 2008.

=== 1999 election ===
1999 Northwest Territories general election
Candidate	Votes	%
Jake Ootes	400	60.98%
Bernie Hughes	256	39.02%
Total valid ballots / Turnout	656	57.76%
Rejected ballots	3	
Source(s) "Official Voting Results 1999 General Election" (PDF). Elections NWT. Archived from the original (PDF) on 11 April 2008.

=== 1979 election ===
1979 Northwest Territories general election
Candidate	Votes	%
Robert H. MacQuarrie	295	33.33%
Rod Morrison	260	29.38%
Claire Barnabe	205	23.16%
Bob Baetz	77	8.70%
Don Green	35	3.96%
Norm Lewis	13	1.47%
Total valid ballots / Turnout	885	64.36%
Rejected ballots	7	
Source(s) "REPORT OF THE CHIEF ELECTORAL OFFICER ON THE GENERAL ELECTION OF MEMBERS TO THE COUNCIL OF THE NORTHWEST TERRITORIES 1979" (PDF). Elections NWT. January 1980.

== See also ==
- List of Northwest Territories territorial electoral districts
- Canadian provincial electoral districts

== Notes ==
a: In the 2007 election, percentages assigned to candidates were based on the total votes cast. In prior elections the percentages were based on the valid votes.
