= Kam Lake =

Territorial electoral district in the Northwest Territories, Canada

Northwest Territories electoral district
- Boundaries of Kam Lake in Yellowknife

Territorial electoral district
- Legislature: Legislative Assembly of the Northwest Territories
MLA
Caitlin Cleveland
- First contested: 1999
- Last contested: 2023

Demographics
- Census subdivision(s): Yellowknife

Kam Lake is a territorial electoral district for the Legislative Assembly of the Northwest Territories, Canada. It is one of seven districts that represent Yellowknife.

A larger-than-usual property tax increase in 2014 saw the area re-zoned by the city of Yellowknife and some of the restrictions around residential building in the industrial area modified.

== Members of the Legislative Assembly (MLAs) ==
Name	Elected	Left Office
Tony Whitford	1999	2003
Dave Ramsay	2003	2015
Kieron Testart	2015	2019
Caitlin Cleveland	2019	present

== Election results ==
=== 2023 election ===
2023 Northwest Territories general election
Candidate	Votes
Caitlin Cleveland (I)	Acclaimed

=== 2019 election ===
2019 Northwest Territories general election
Candidate	Votes
Caitlin Cleveland	262
Robert Hawkins	224
Kieron Testart (I)	220
Rommel Silverio	125
Abdullah Al-Mahamud	63
Cherish Winsor	61

=== 2015 election ===
2015 Northwest Territories general election
Candidate	Votes	%
Kieron Testart	280	58.1
Dave Ramsay	202	41.9
Total valid ballots	482	
Rejected ballots	4	
Registered electors / Turnout	1,923	25.3
Source(s) Elections NWT, 2015 Official voting Results

=== 2011 election ===
2011 Northwest Territories general election
Candidate	Votes
Dave Ramsay	356
Darwin Rudkevitch	118
Victor Mercredi	45
Bryan Sutherland	28

=== 2007 election ===
2007 Northwest Territories general election
Candidate	Votes	%
Dave Ramsay	489	79.51%
Brad Enge	118	19.19%
Total valid ballots / Turnout	607	50.12%
Rejected ballots	8	
Source(s) "Official Voting Results 2007 General Election" (PDF). Elections NWT. Archived from the original (PDF) on 11 April 2008.

=== 2003 election ===
2003 Northwest Territories general election
Candidate	Votes	%
Dave Ramsay	372	49.53%
Bill Aho	268	35.69%
Steve Petersen	111	14.78%
Total valid ballots / Turnout	751	66.93%
Rejected ballots	0	
Source(s) "Official Voting Results 2003 General Election" (PDF). Elections NWT. Archived from the original (PDF) on 11 April 2008.

=== 1999 election ===
1999 Northwest Territories general election
Candidate	Votes	%
Tony Whitford	584	80.44%
Beaton Mackenzie	74	10.19%
Steve Petersen	68	9.37%
Total valid ballots / Turnout	726	58.59%
Rejected ballots	4	
Source(s) "Official Voting Results 1999 General Election" (PDF). Elections NWT. Archived from the original (PDF) on 11 April 2008.

== Notes ==
a: In the 2007 election, percentages assigned to candidates were based on the total votes cast. In prior elections the percentages were based on the valid votes.

== See also ==
- List of Northwest Territories territorial electoral districts
- Canadian provincial electoral districts
