= Range Lake =

Territorial electoral district in the Northwest Territories, Canada

Northwest Territories electoral district
- Boundaries of Range Lake in Yellowknife

Territorial electoral district
- Legislature: Legislative Assembly of the Northwest Territories
MLA
Kieron Testart
- First contested: 1999
- Last contested: 2023

Demographics
- Census subdivision(s): Yellowknife

Range Lake is a territorial electoral district for the Legislative Assembly of the Northwest Territories, Canada. It is one of seven districts that represent Yellowknife.

Caroline Cochrane, who represented the district from 2015 to 2023, was the 13th premier of the Northwest Territories, from 2019 to 2023.

== Members of the Legislative Assembly (MLAs) ==
Name	Elected	Left Office
Sandy Lee	1999	March 26, 2011
Daryl Dolynny	2011	2015
Caroline Cochrane	2015	2023
Kieron Testart	2023	present

== Election results ==
=== 2023 election ===
2023 Northwest Territories general election
Candidate	Votes	%
Kieron Testart	326	55.25
Aaron Reid	155	26.27
Nicole Sok	109	18.47
Total votes	590	

=== 2019 election ===
2019 Northwest Territories general election
Candidate	Votes
Caroline Cochrane	439
Hughie Graham	421

=== 2015 election ===
2019 Northwest Territories general election
Candidate	Votes	%
Caroline Cochrane	333	50.4
Daryl Dolynny	328	49.6
Total valid ballots / Turnout	661	32%

=== 2011 election ===
2011 Northwest Territories general election
Candidate	Votes
Daryl Dolynny	277
David Wasylciw	210
Beaton Mackenzie	167
Norman Smith	64

=== 2007 election ===
2007 Northwest Territories general election
Candidate	Votes	%
Sandy Lee	564	72.59%
Ashley Geraghty	210	27.03%
Total valid ballots / Turnout	774	52.11%
Rejected ballots	3	
Source(s) "Official Voting Results 2007 General Election" (PDF). Elections NWT. Archived from the original (PDF) on 11 April 2008.

=== 2003 election ===
2003 Northwest Territories general election
Candidate	Votes	%
Sandy Lee	630	80.56%
Francis H. Chang	152	19.44%
Total valid ballots / Turnout	782	48.74%
Rejected ballots	9	
Source(s) "Official Voting Results 2003 General Election" (PDF). Elections NWT. Archived from the original (PDF) on 11 April 2008.

=== 1999 election ===
1999 Northwest Territories general election
Candidate	Votes	%
Sandy Lee	460	46.70%
Dave Ramsay	329	33.40%
Roger Russell	73	7.41%
Alex M. Debogorski	67	6.80%
Everett Kastell	56	5.69%
Total valid ballots / Turnout	985	69.98%
Rejected ballots	1	
Source(s) "Official Voting Results 1999 General Election" (PDF). Elections NWT. Archived from the original (PDF) on 11 April 2008.

== See also ==
- List of Northwest Territories territorial electoral districts
- Canadian provincial electoral districts

== Notes ==
a: In the 2007 election, percentages assigned to candidates were based on the total votes cast. In prior elections the percentages were based on the valid votes.
