= Inuvik Twin Lakes =

Territorial electoral district in the Northwest Territories, Canada

Northwest Territories electoral district
- Boundaries of Inuvik Twin Lakes

Territorial electoral district
- Legislature: Legislative Assembly of the Northwest Territories
MLA
Vacant
- First contested: 1999
- Last contested: 2023
- Region: Inuvik Region
- Communities: Inuvik

Inuvik Twin Lakes is a territorial electoral district for the Legislative Assembly of the Northwest Territories, Canada. It is one of two districts that represent Inuvik, alongside the district of Inuvik Boot Lake. The electoral districts were created in 1999 from the old Inuvik electoral district.

== Members of the Legislative Assembly (MLAs) ==
Name	Elected	Left Office
Roger Allen	1999	2004
Robert C. McLeod	2004	2019
Lesa Semmler	2019	2026

== Election results ==
=== 2026 by-election ===
Northwest Territories territorial by-election, November 24, 2026
Candidate	Votes	%
Mataya Gillis		
Jake Jellema		
Sallie Ross		
Eligible voters		
Total valid ballots		
Rejected ballots		
Turnout		

=== 2023 election ===
2023 Northwest Territories general election
Candidate	Votes	%
Lesa Semmler (I)	322	71.56
Lenora McLeod	128	28.44
Total votes	450	

=== 2019 election ===
2019 Northwest Territories general election
Candidate	Votes
Lesa Semmler	470
Sallie Ross	106
Donald Hendrick	41

=== 2015 election ===
2015 Northwest Territories general election
Candidate	Votes	%
Robert C. McLeod	262	60.1
Jimmy Kalinek	174	39.9
Total valid ballots / Turnout	436	43%

=== 2011 election ===
2011 Northwest Territories general election
Candidate	Votes
Robert C. McLeod	Acclaimed

=== 2007 election ===
2007 Northwest Territories general election
Candidate	Votes	%
Robert C. McLeod	306	53.78%
Denise Kurszewski	261	45.87%
Total valid ballots / Turnout	567	94.21%
Rejected ballots	2	
Source(s) "Official Voting Results 2007 General Election" (PDF). Elections NWT. Archived from the original (PDF) on 11 April 2008.

=== 2004 by-election ===
Northwest Territories territorial by-election, November 29, 2004
Candidate	Votes	%
Robert C. McLeod	169	24.89%
Pauline Gordon	158	23.27%
Arlene Hansen	143	21.06%
Tom Williams	99	14.58%
Clarence Wood	43	6.33%
Bob Simpson	41	6.04%
Richard Binder	26	3.83%
Total valid ballots / Turnout	679	122.88% [sic]
Rejected ballots	3	
Source(s) "Report on the Inuvik Twin Lakes By-election and Official Results" (PDF). Elections NWT. Archived from the original (PDF) on 11 April 2008.

=== 2003 election ===
2003 Northwest Territories general election
Candidate	Votes	%
Roger Allen	295	54.53%
Clarence Wood	123	22.74%
Ken Smith	101	18.67%
Bobby Van Bridger	22	4.07%
Total valid ballots / Turnout	541	152.53% [sic]
Rejected ballots	2	
Source(s) "Official Voting Results 2003 General Election" (PDF). Elections NWT. Archived from the original (PDF) on 11 April 2008.

=== 1999 election ===
1999 Northwest Territories general election
Candidate	Votes	%
Roger Allen	216	45.57%
Glenna Hansen	178	37.55%
George Roach	80	16.88%
Total valid ballots / Turnout	474	84.78%
Rejected ballots	5	
Source(s) "Official Voting Results 1999 General Election" (PDF). Elections NWT. Archived from the original (PDF) on 11 April 2008.

== Notes ==
a: In the 2007 election, percentages assigned to candidates were based on the total votes cast. In prior elections the percentages were based on the valid votes.

== See also ==
- List of Northwest Territories territorial electoral districts
- Canadian provincial electoral districts
