= Premier of the Northwest Territories =

Head of government of the Northwest Territories

- Premier ministre des Territoires du Nord-Ouest
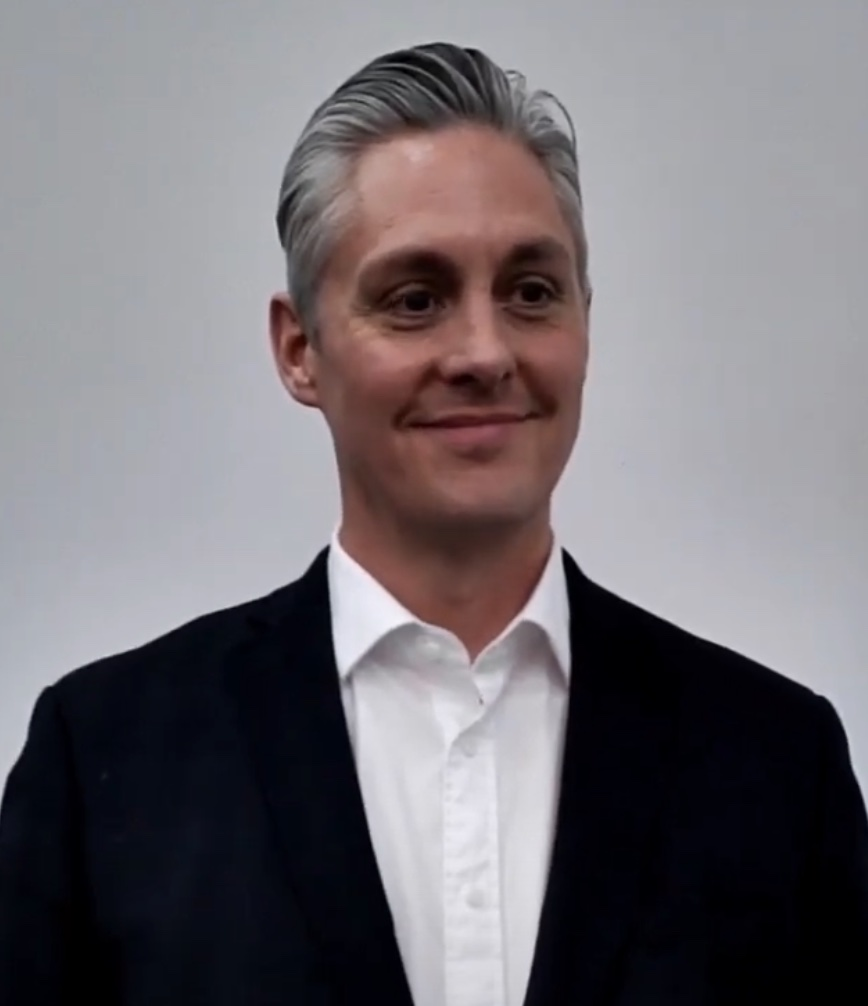
- Incumbent; R. J. Simpson since December 8, 2023
- Office of the Premier
- Style: The Honourable (formal); Premier (informal)
- Status: Head of Government
- Member of: Legislative Assembly; Executive Council
- Reports to: Legislative Assembly; Commissioner
- Seat: Yellowknife
- Appointer: Commissioner of the Northwest Territories; with the confidence of the Northwest Territories Legislature
- Term length: At His Majesty's pleasure; contingent on the premier's ability to command confidence in the legislative assembly
- Formation: October 7, 1897
- First holder: Frederick Haultain
- Deputy: Deputy premier of the Northwest Territories
- Salary: $103,851 plus $78,896 (indemnity) and allowances
- Website: Office of the Premier

The premier of the Northwest Territories is the first minister and head of government for the Canadian territory of the Northwest Territories. The premier is the territory's head of government, similar to a provincial premier.

Unlike provincial premiers, who are appointed by a lieutenant-governor on the basis of their leadership of a majority bloc in the legislature, the premier of the Northwest Territories is elected, along with the Cabinet, by the non-partisan members of the territory's Legislative Assembly, in accordance with the system of consensus government, and then appointed by the commissioner of the Northwest Territories.

Before 1994, the term "government leader" was officially used instead of "premier," but the title of premier was later retroactively applied to government leaders starting with George Braden in 1980, and had been in informal use for several years, based on the historical precedent set by Frederick W. A. G. Haultain, who used the title of premier of the North-West Territories from 1897 to 1905.

The current premier of the Northwest Territories is R. J. Simpson, since December 8, 2023.

== See also ==
- Prime Minister of Canada
- List of premiers of the Northwest Territories
