= Legislative Assembly of the Northwest Territories =

Unicameral legislature of the Northwest Territories

Northwest Territories Legislative Assembly List: 10 other official names: Assemblée législative des Territoires du Nord-Ouest (French); Beba Ɂełígíth Ɂeła Déłtth’ı Kų́é (Chipewyan); ᒪᓕᒐᓕᐅᖅᑎᑦ (Inuktitut); K'áowe gogha ełek'éterewe ke łénakedé (North Slavey); Gogha Sombaa Nálée (South Slavey); Ek’ètehtsodǫ Łegehdı̀ Kǫ̀ (Tlicho); Ihumiurviat Malirutaliatigun (Inuinnaqtun); Dagwidįį'è' Tr'igwahtsii Geenjit Nadhat Kat" (Gwichʼin); Legislative Assemblitkut (Inuinnaqtun)
- 20th Northwest Territories Legislative Assembly

Type
- Type: Unicameral

Leadership
- Speaker: Shane Thompson since December 7, 2023
- Premier: R.J. Simpson since 8 December 2023

Structure
- Seats: 19
- Political groups: None: Independents (18); Vacant (1)

Elections
- Last election: November 14, 2023
- Next election: on or before October 4, 2027

Meeting place
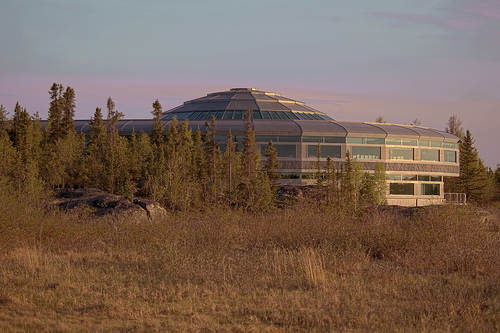
- Legislative Building, Yellowknife, Northwest Territories, Canada

Website
- www.ntassembly.ca

The Northwest Territories Legislative Assembly, or Legislative Council of the Northwest Territories (with Northwest hyphenated as North-West until 1906), is the legislature and the seat of government of Northwest Territories in Canada. It is a unicameral elected body that creates and amends law in the Northwest Territories. Permanently located in Yellowknife since 1993, the assembly was founded in 1870 and became active in 1872 with the first appointments from the Government of Canada.

Until 2014, the assembly was officially defined under federal law as "Legislative Council". However, under Northwest Territories territorial law, it was defined as "Legislative Assembly". The federal name was changed when the Northwest Territories Act was rewritten in 2014. Under different periods of its history it has alternated names.

Members of the Legislative Assembly are sworn in by the commissioner of the Northwest Territories.

== Early history ==
The Legislative Assembly was first known as the Temporary North-West Council and was created in 1870. The first appointments to the council were made on December 28, 1872. The Temporary Council was dissolved in 1876 and a new permanent council was appointed and moved to the new capital of Fort Livingstone in 1876. The council moved to Battleford a year later based on the planned location there of the Canadian Pacific Railway.

The very first election to the Assembly would take place on March 23, 1881, as Lawrence Clarke was elected to represent the electoral district of Lorne. In 1883 the Assembly moved south to Regina based on amendments to the route of the railway. The first territory-wide election took place on September 15, 1885, known as the 1885 North-West Territories election.

Three years later the first general election took place. All the voting members of the Assembly were elected for the first time, and an elected speaker took office. The Lieutenant Governor still had executive authority however and appointed and ran the cabinet. After the second general election in 1891 the first fully elected Assembly without any appointed members. The Assembly achieved Responsible Government for the first time in October 1897 as the Lieutenant Governor appointed Frederick Haultain as the first Premier to form a government. Robert Brett became the first Leader of the official opposition and party lines were roughly drawn based on Conservatives and Liberals.

The Haultain government lobbied for Government of Canada for provincial powers for the North-West Territories. In response on September 1, 1905, the provinces of Alberta and Saskatchewan were created by Prime Minister Wilfrid Laurier out of the southern populated portion of the territories.

== Court of law ==
The Northwest Territories Legislative Assembly served as the first court of law in the North-West Territories from 1876 until the creation of the Supreme Court of the North-West Territories in 1887. Appointed members of the council served as stipendiary magistrates who would travel the territories and oversee legal cases when the legislature was not sitting. In 1887 the North-West Territories moved to a new system that assigned judges to judicial districts and separated the legal and judicial branches.

== Ottawa ==
After the creation of Alberta and Saskatchewan, the remainder of the Northwest Territories was too sparsely populated by enfranchised voters to justify holding elections. The territory reverted to its confederation entry status. A new council was set up in Ottawa consisting of a Commissioner—the effective replacement of the Lieutenant Governor—and four appointed members.

Frederick White was appointed as the first Commissioner and did not recall the council to sit during his time in office. During this time, the Territories were run by the federal Department of Mines and Resources. The first session of the Council of the Northwest Territories took place in 1921. The council members were bureaucrats appointed from the Interior Ministry and were not resident citizens of the territory.

In 1939, the Yellowknife Administration District was created to provide services within 25 miles of Yellowknife. However, it was not until 1947 that John G. McNiven was appointed to represent the district. McNiven was the first member appointed to the council from north of the 60th parallel.

In 1951 the council held its first general election in 49 years. The fifth general election elected three members from the District of Mackenzie. The old council was completely dissolved and five members were appointed along with the three elected representatives.

The council gradually gained more powers back from the federal government as the population in the territory grew. In 1967 the Carrothers Commission moved the territorial capital from Ottawa to Yellowknife and for the first time elected members represented all parts of the territories. In 1975 the Legislative Assembly became fully elected, and the first elected speaker since 1905, David Searle, presided over the Assembly.

== Consensus government ==
Commissioner John Parker gave up his powers of running the executive council and appointed George Braden as leader of the government and the first premier since 1905. The model of responsible government that was used this time around was known as consensus government. The executive council or cabinet forms government while all the regular members form an unofficial opposition.

The modern consensus government model is inherently non-partisan and serves effectively as a constant minority government. The legislature uses this model up to the current day; the same model of government is also used in the Legislative Assembly of Nunavut, although Canada's other territorial legislature, the Legislative Assembly of Yukon, uses a traditional partisan politics model.

The consensus government model has received criticism on various grounds, including that it hampers long-term political and economic development in the territory because the lack of political parties mean that there is no mechanism to carry over a political agenda from one assembly to the next; that it complicates the ability of less wealthy citizens to serve in the assembly because the lack of political parties means that election candidates must raise all of their campaign funds on their own; that it prevents the voters from being able to demand or vote for systemic change, since there is no mechanism to replace an ineffective or underperforming government with another alternative; and that it hampers efforts to improve diversity in representation, such as the election of more women and ethnic minorities to the legislature.

In 2018, MLA Kieron Testart introduced an amendment to the territorial Elections Act to permit the introduction of party politics in the legislative assembly, but his motion received no support from other MLAs and was dropped. In 2019, he planned to organize a group of ideologically aligned MLA candidates in the 2019 Northwest Territories general election into a "Liberal Democratic" slate, but backed off of the plan after it was leaked to the press.

== Assembly buildings ==
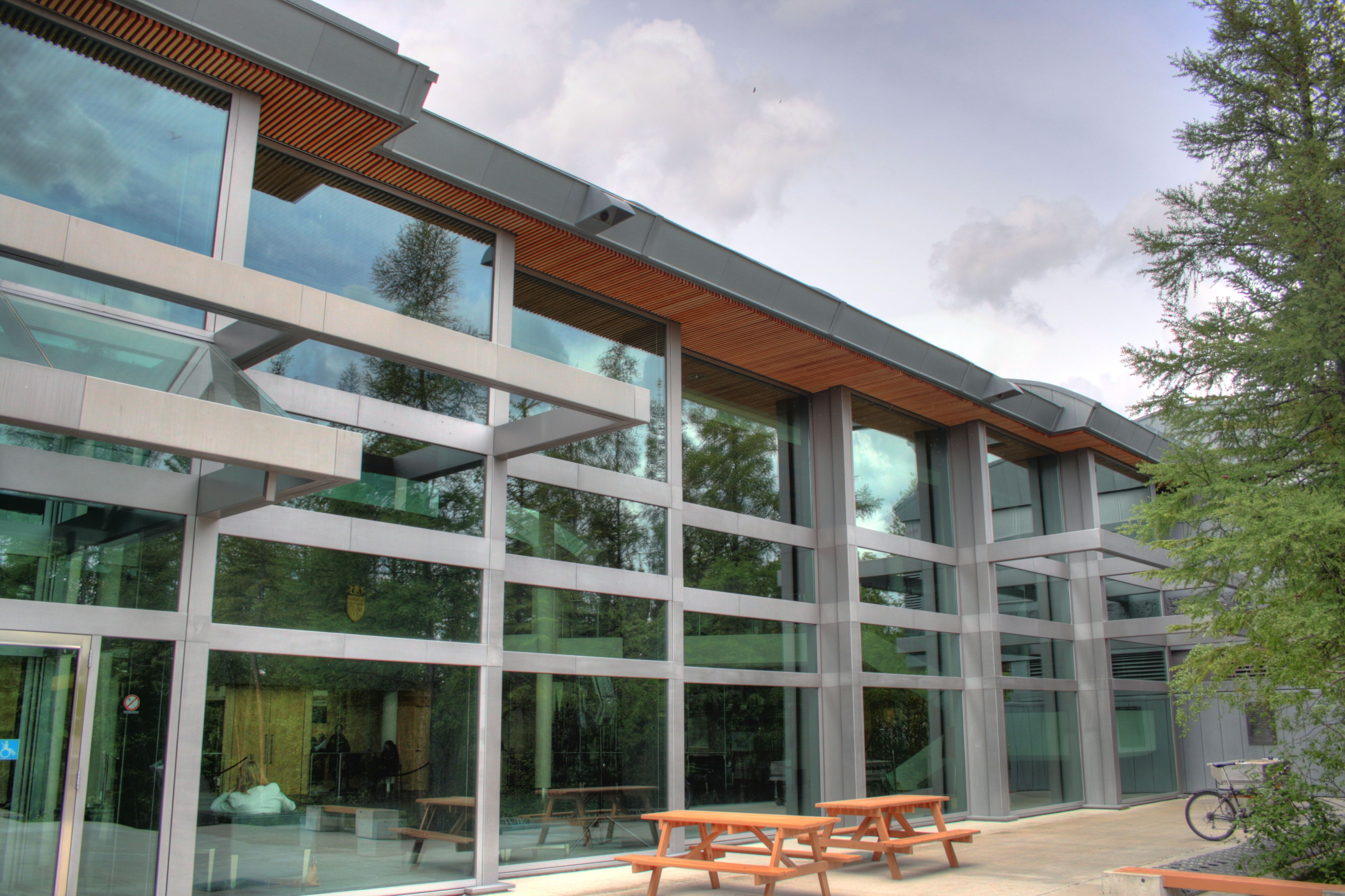
The south entrance to the current Legislature building.

The building that has housed the Northwest Territories Legislative Assembly has changed many times since it was founded. The first building was the original Manitoba Legislature in Fort Garry. After the council moved to Fort Livingstone it was housed in the Swan River Barracks used by the North-West Mounted Police.

The first building built for the needs of the Assembly was NWT Government House in Battleford. That building also served as a residence for the Lieutenant Governor. In 1883 the Assembly moved to Regina. The Territorial Administration building was built to accommodate the growing Assembly and used until 1905.

After the creation of Alberta and Saskatchewan, the capital was moved to Ottawa and the council sessions took place in an office building on Sparks Street. When the council sessions returned to the territory, the legislature initially travelled between the territory's various major communities, bringing all of its personnel, furniture and equipment on the continuous journey. Legislative sessions were held in any convenient local infrastructure, including school gymnasiums, church halls, community recreational facilities, and hotel function rooms.

After the capital was moved to Yellowknife in 1967 a temporary site for the Legislative Assembly was used until the new Legislature building was finished in 1993. The design of the current Legislature building was created by Pin/Taylor Architects company from Yellowknife.

== Membership ==
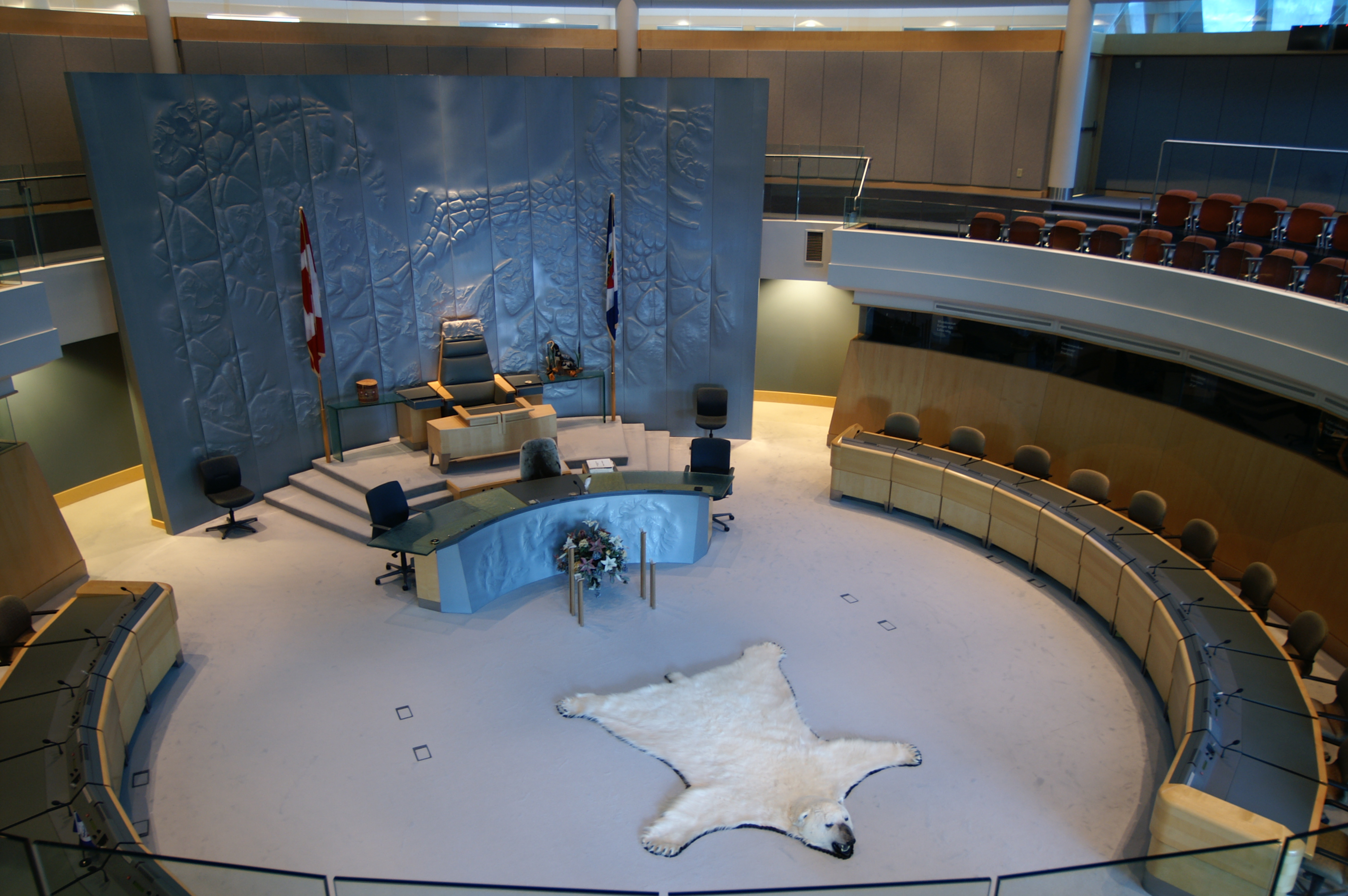
Interior of the legislative assembly

The membership of the 20th Northwest Territories Legislative Assembly, was selected in the 2023 Northwest Territories general election on November 14, 2023. Each member represents one electoral district.

The territory has fixed election date legislation that ensures elections are held every four years on the first Monday in October.

The legislature since 1905 is a non-partisan body and all members run and sit as independents.

Jane Weyallon Armstrong's by-election win in Monfwi on July 27, 2021, during the 19th Legislative Assembly, saw the Northwest Territories become the first provincial or territorial government in Canada with a majority of its membership identifying as female. At the time, the territory was also led by the nation's only female premier, Caroline Cochrane.

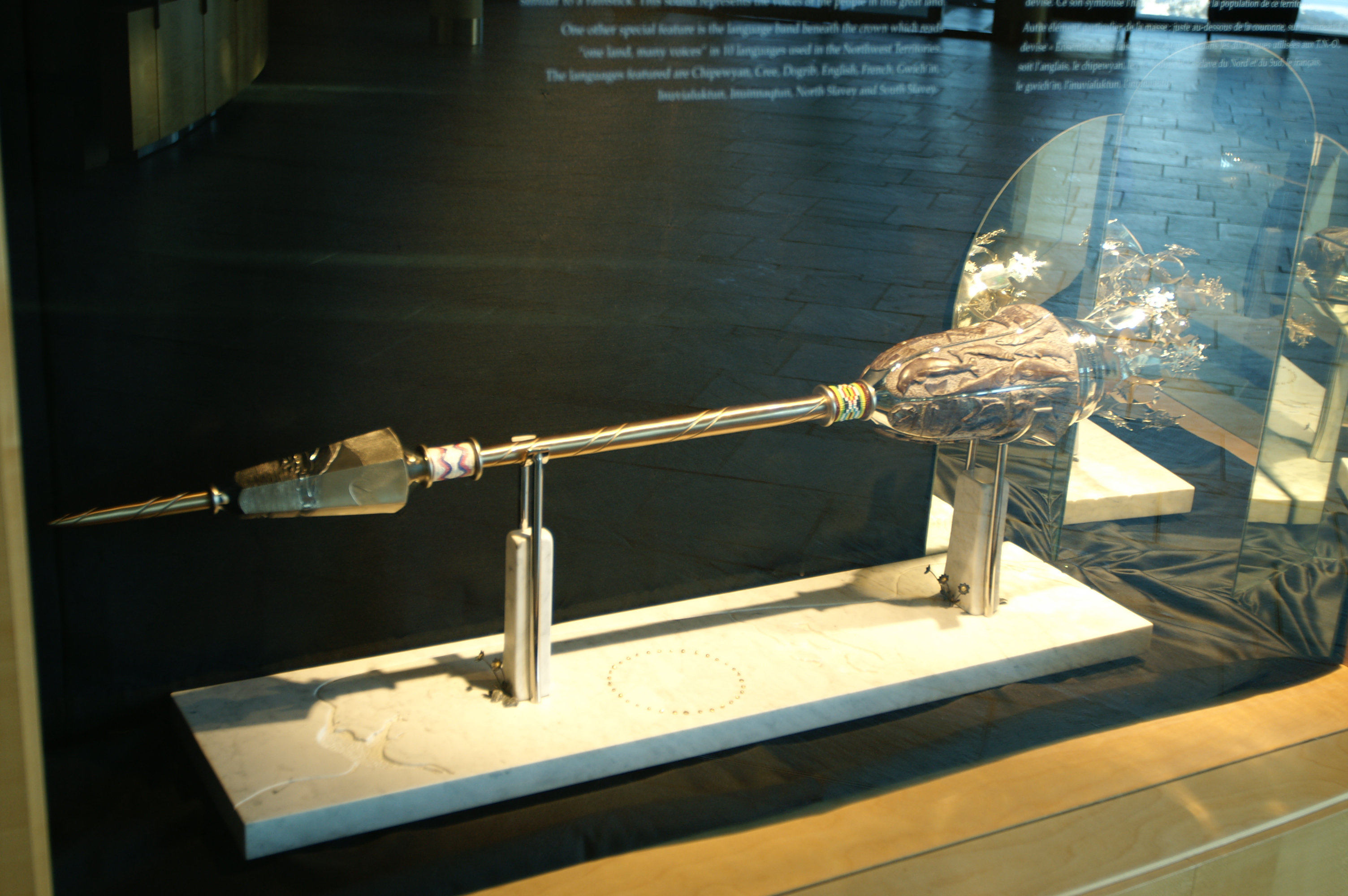
Mace of the Northwest Territories

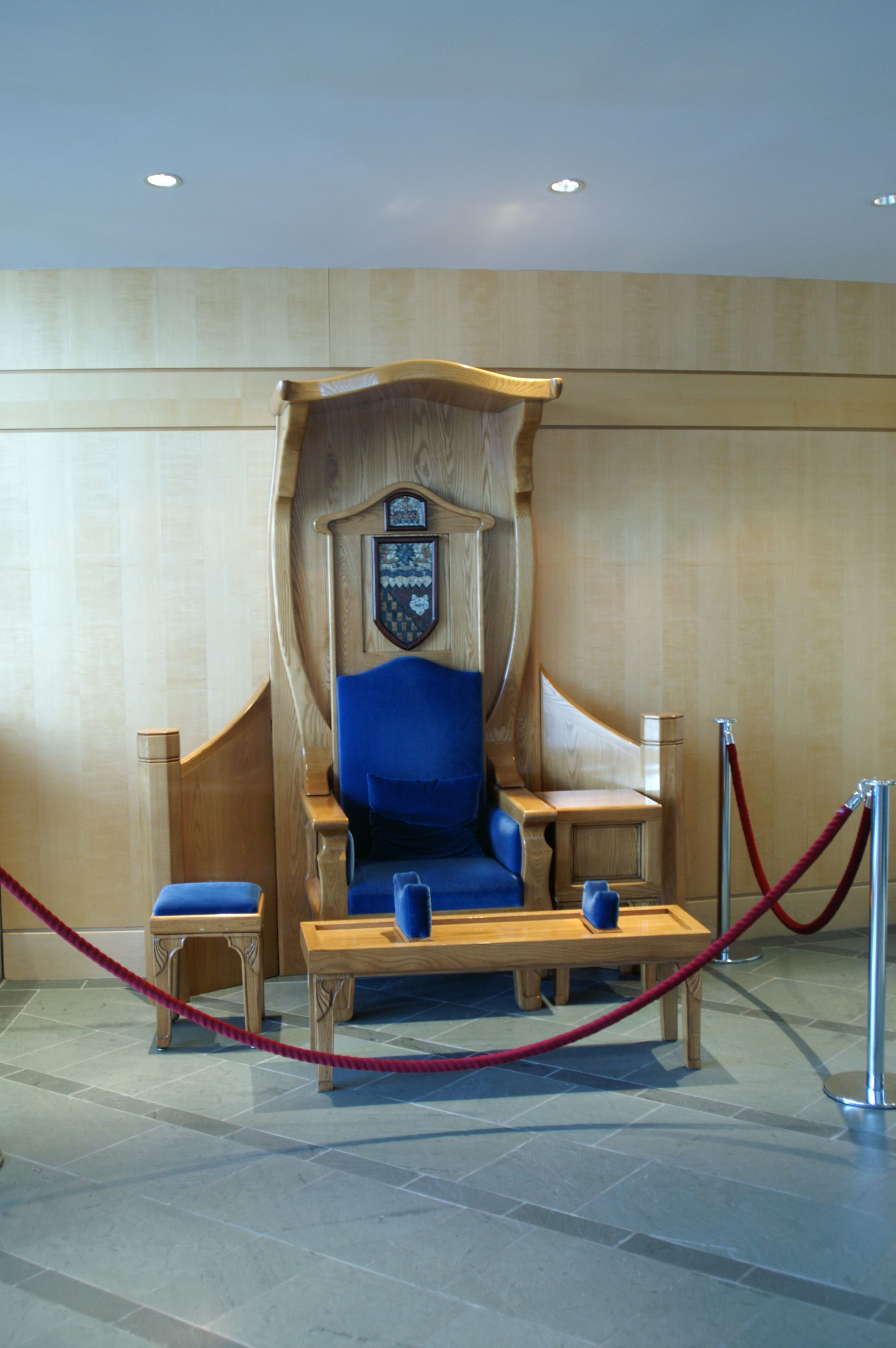
Commissioners chair at the legislative assembly

The current membership is as follows:

Member	District	First elected / previously elected	No. of terms
Sheryl Yakeleya	Deh Cho	2023	1st term
Julian Morse	Frame Lake	2023	1st term
Kate Reid	Great Slave	2023	1st term
R. J. Simpson	Hay River North	2015	3rd term
Vince McKay	Hay River South	2023	1st term
Denny Rodgers	Inuvik Boot Lake	2023	1st term
Vacant	Inuvik Twin Lakes	—N/a	—N/a
Caitlin Cleveland	Kam Lake	2019	2nd term
George Nerysoo	Mackenzie Delta	2023	1st term
Jane Armstrong	Monfwi	2021	2nd term
Shane Thompson	Nahendeh	2015	3rd term
Lucy Kuptana	Nunakput	2023	1st term
Kieron Testart	Range Lake	2015, (Note: Kam Lake) 2023	2nd term*
Daniel McNeely	Sahtu	2015, 2023	2nd term*
Jay MacDonald	Thebacha	2023	1st term
Richard Edjericon	Tu Nedhé-Wiilideh	2022	2nd term
Robert Hawkins	Yellowknife Centre	2003, 2023	4th term*
Shauna Morgan	Yellowknife North	2023	1st term
Caroline Wawzonek	Yellowknife South	2019	2nd term

== Cabinet Ministers ==
The seven ministers of the Government of the NWT are found in the Executive Council of the Northwest Territories.

== See also ==
- List of Northwest Territories Legislative Assemblies
- List of Northwest Territories general elections
- Speaker of the Legislative Assembly of the Northwest Territories
