= Weaver & Devore Trading =

General store in Yellowknife, Canada

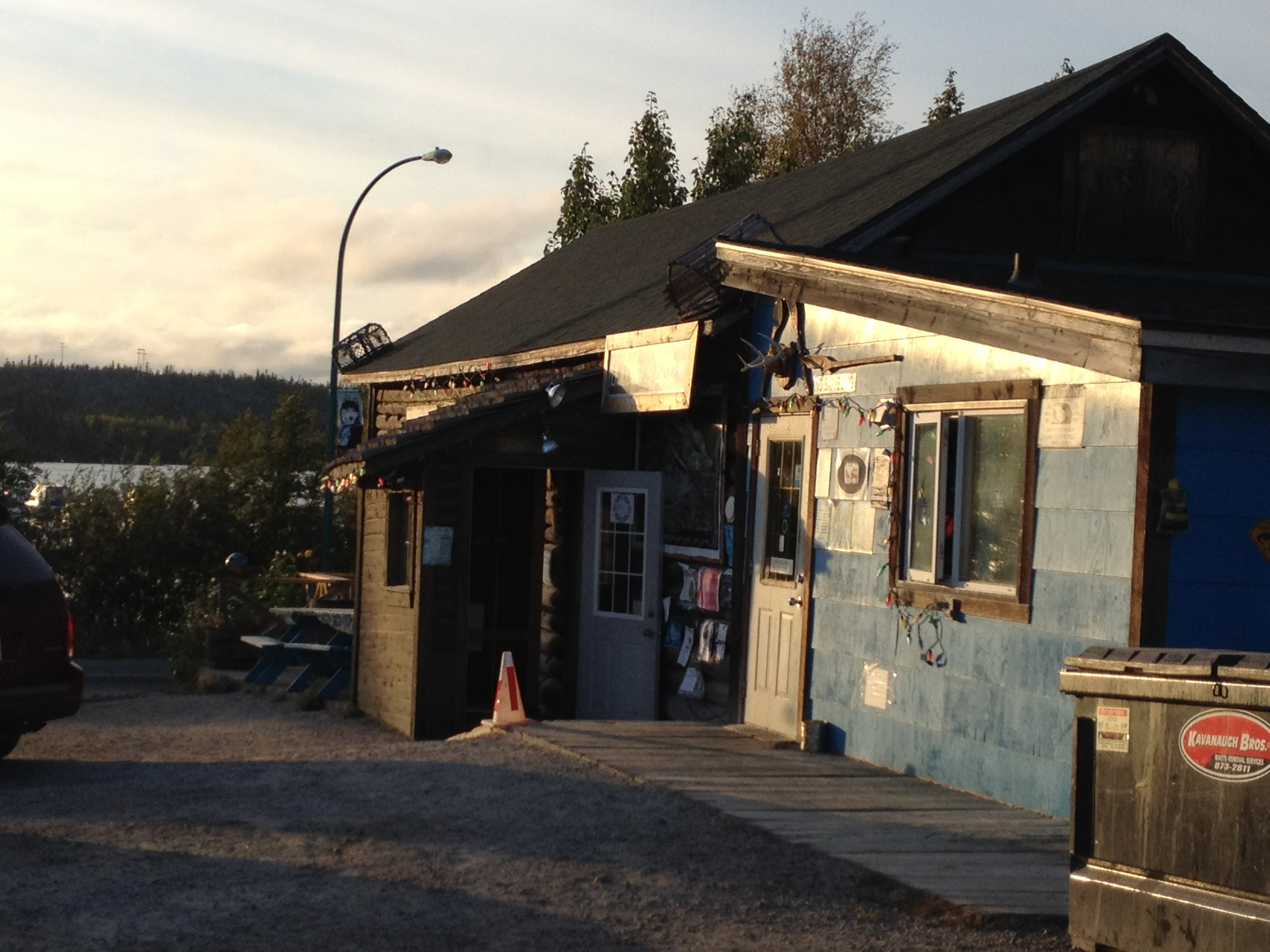
The original store on Weaver Drive. Now a restaurant.

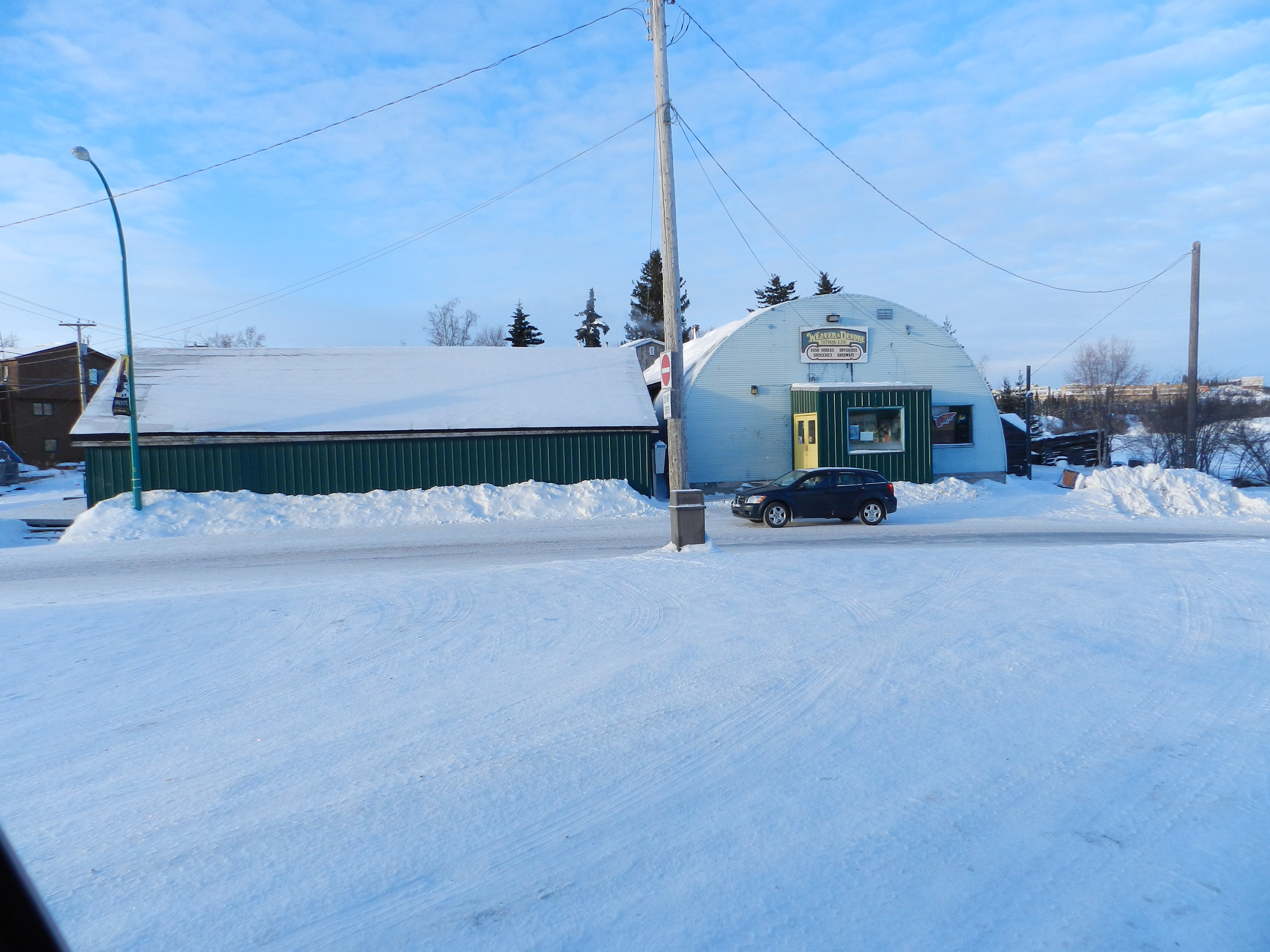
The current Weaver and Devore store

Weaver & Devore Trading is an independent general store located in Yellowknife, Northwest Territories, Canada. It was established in 1936 by Harry Weaver and Ellis "Bud" Devore, fur traders and watercraft men from Peace River, Alberta. Their first trade run to Yellowknife Bay in 1936 was in response to the increased mining activity that summer. The following year, the partners had erected a permanent log-cabin trading post and business boomed as Yellowknife grew into an important commercial centre. Bud Devore sold out in 1955, Harry Weaver died in 1957, and the business continued to operate under the name Weaver & Devore and continued to be held by the Weaver family until 2025. The store discontinued the fur trading business in the 1980s and now specializes in general merchandise, produce, bush orders, and outdoor clothing.

== History ==
The store expanded into its current premises, on the other side of Weaver Drive, in the 1960s. The original Weaver & Devore trading post from 1937 is now a popular local restaurant called Bullock's Bistro (Bullock's Fish and Chips, 62°27′53″N 114°21′00″W) and a City of Yellowknife Historical Site.

Curtis Dunford and Cherish Winsor purchased Weaver & Devore Trading in 2025 and intend to continue operating the store, along with their two boys, in the same manner as it has since opening. Dunford and Winsor say they will not be making the core operations, opening hours, and name.
