= Ranney Hill =

Coordinates: 62°32′47″N 114°23′19″W

Ranney Hill (pronounced, 'Ran-ee") is a rock outcrop approximately 10 kilometers north of Yellowknife, the capital city of the Northwest Territories of Canada. At 682 ft / 208 m. high, it is one of three visible outcrops that can be seen north of the city. It is an anomaly rising from the relatively flat Canadian Shield.

== History of the name ==
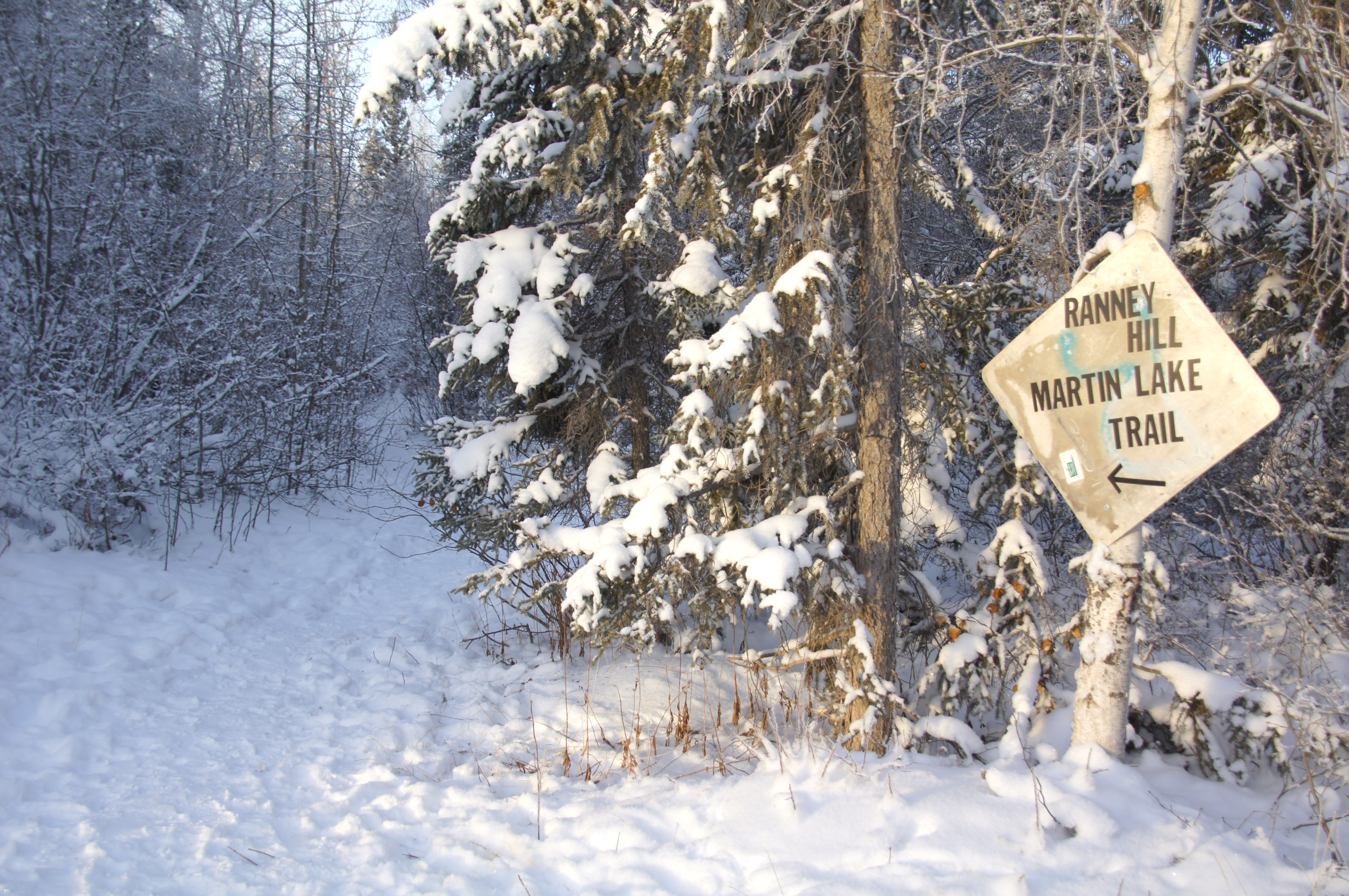
The entrance to the Ranney Hill-Martin Lake trail from Vee Lake Road. It is 1 km. to the Hill and one more to Martin Lake.

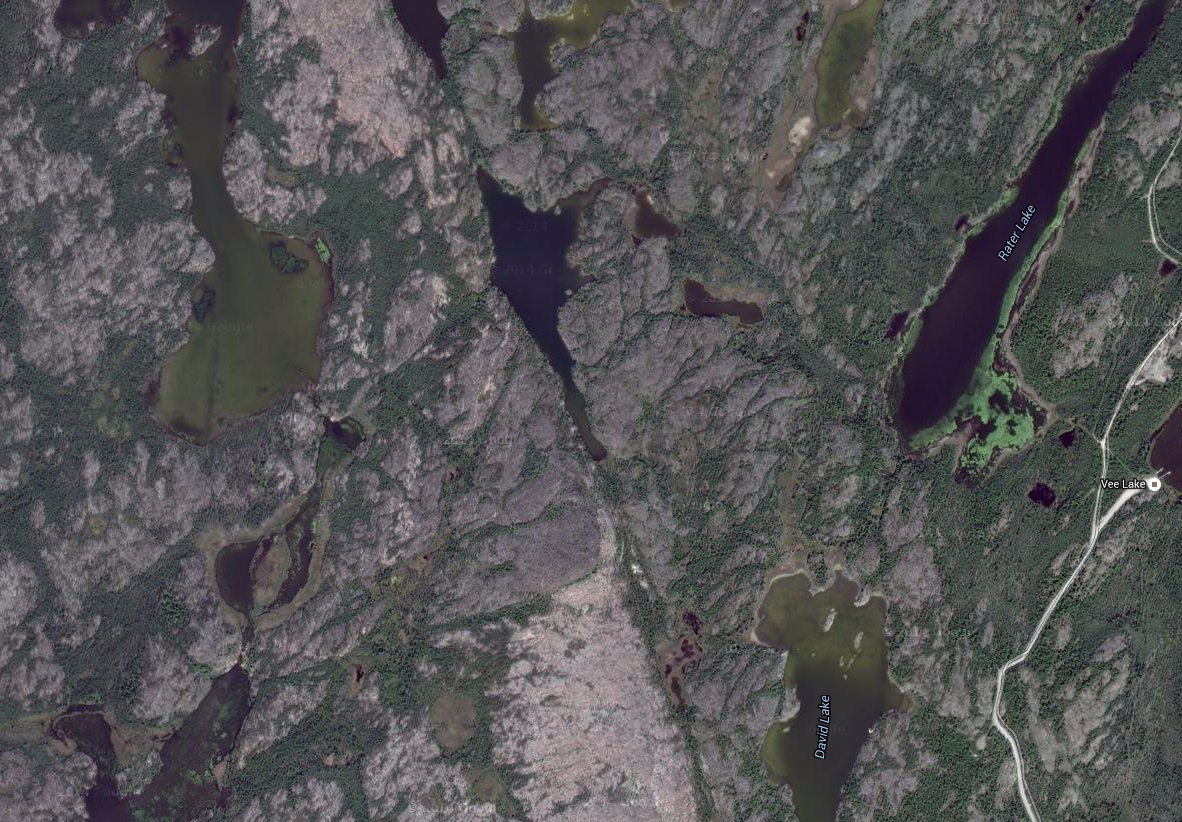
David Lake at the bottom; Rater running into the Northeast corner; and Ranney Hill, the dark grey triangular shape just left of center.

Ranney Hill is named after Winslow C. Ranney, a prospector and trapper who first came into the Yellowknife region in 1934. Numerous claims were staked in this area between 1935 and 1937 by Mr. Ranney. Development was undertaken by a small crew under Ranney’s supervision during 1937 and 1938, and apparently Ranney utilized a small milling unit to recover some gold from a short mine tunnel around 1939. Further exploration was conducted at this site during the 1940s by Ranney Gold Mines Limited, but no further mining development was undertaken. Ranney's now abandoned cabin, claim, and tunnel are between David Lake and Rater Lake — lakes seen in the first illustrative panorama below. In 1998, claims were staked in the area and some shallow x-ray diamond drilling was conducted on Ranney's main claim. The results of this work are unknown. Presently, the Ranney Hill area is a favored hiking destination and is well-marked by ribbons from the Vee Lake Road.

== Geology ==
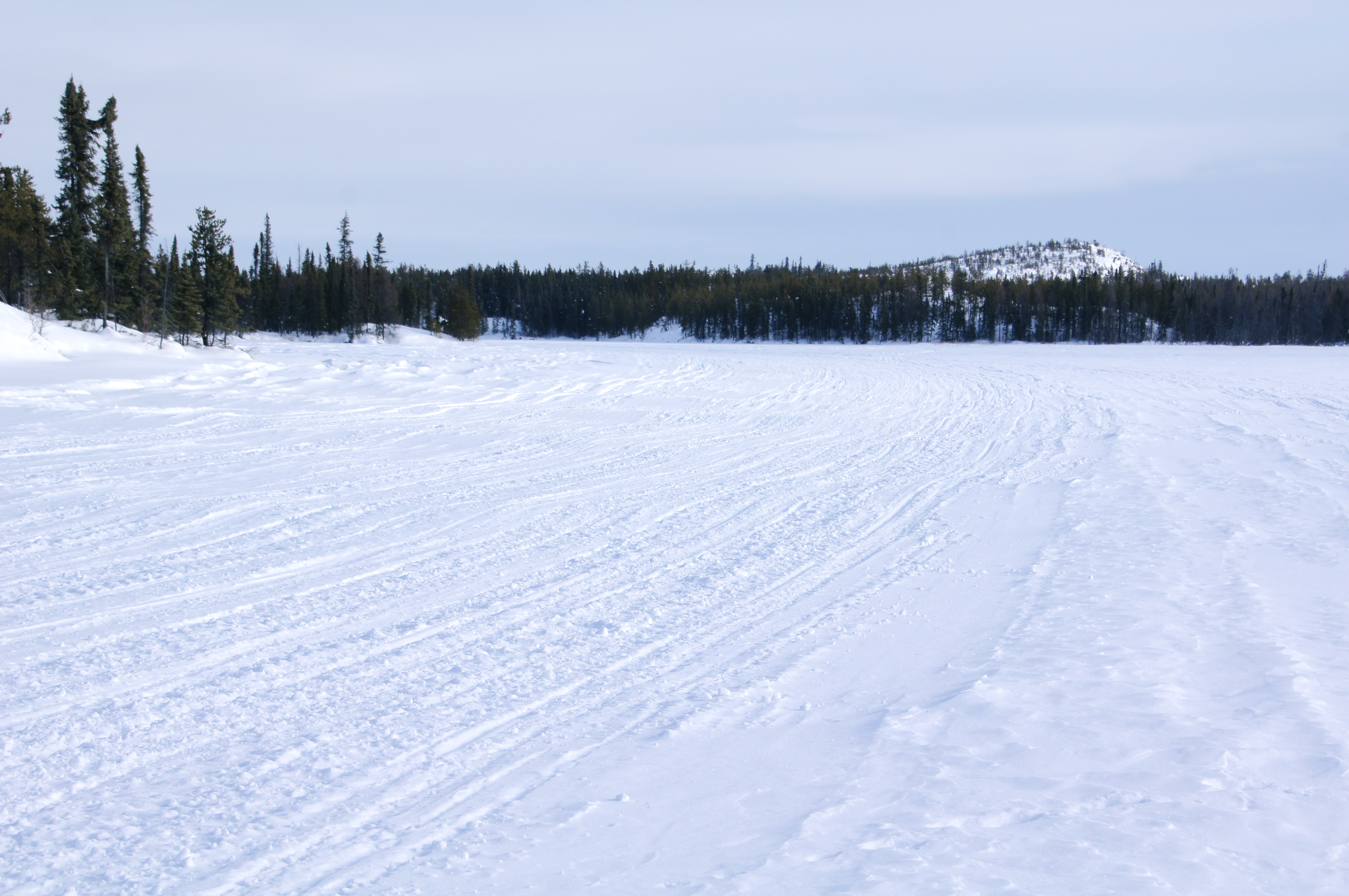
Ranney Hill viewed from the west on Martin Lake.

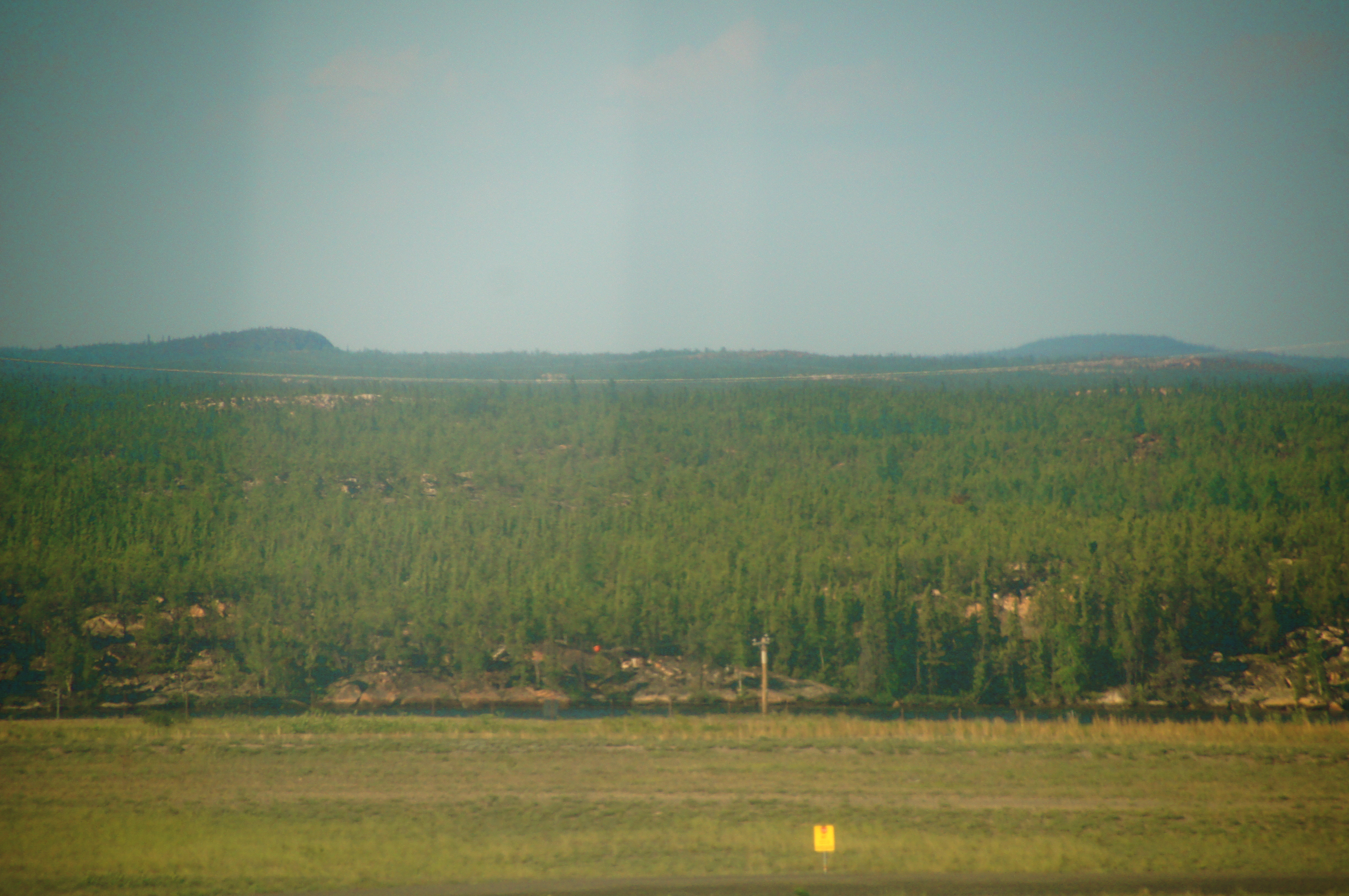
Ranney Hill, left, and Berry Hill from the tarmac of Yellowknife Airport.

The hill is a large mound of volcanic rock. It was able to resist breakdown by the powerful glaciers that scraped the land in a roughly northwest to southeast direction because cracks in the original magma were infused with silica-like minerals such as quartz. These granodiorite (high content of plagioclase feldspar) dykes and intrusions are pronounced especially along the south face. The hill rises out of a large field of pink granite (pink from high potassium feldspar). Beds of these small rounded boulders lie at the immediate base of the hill's southeast face providing evidence of their tumbling over the edge of the hill after a journey from the northwest under a glacier. Further north along the east face large chunks of the hill have been eroded off the face. Ranney Hill is beside the West Bay Fault Line where the land on the right of the fault is believed to have moved five kilometers north of its original position during the early shaping of the area.

== Location ==
Ranney Hill is an easy drive from Yellowknife, NWT over two types of surfaces, chip seal and gravel. The short journey begins on the new bypass road that forms the beginning of the Ingraham Trail (Highway 4) accessible between Old Airport Rd. and the end of Highway 3. After driving approximately five minutes, the entrance to Vee Lake Road will be seen on the left. After another 10 minutes, the entrance to Ranney Hill will be seen on the left at the last sharp turn of the road before the boat launch, a few hundred meters further. There is no formal parking space at the entrance; visitors park along the widen road edge. Using the new what3words geocoding location tool, the entrance to the trail is found at sunglasses.untaxed.beasts.

== Present day ==
Ranney Hill is a popular hiking destination because of it close proximity to Yellowknife and its 360° view of the landscape. The area also offers geocaching possibilities. Hikers enroute to the hill should especially note the raised peat plateau at weary.redeye.achievement and a large area of ice-sculpted "whalebacks" at thundering.midnight.boater.

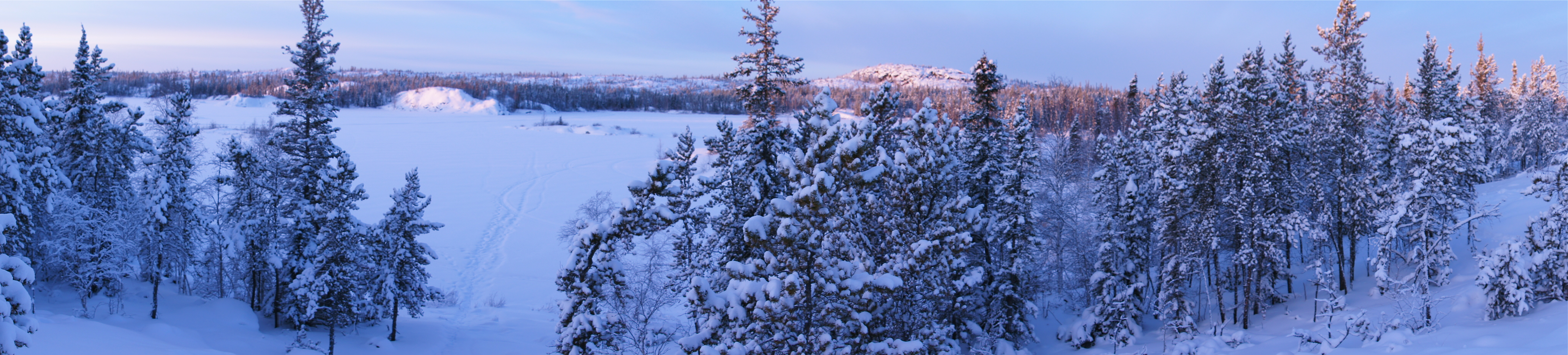
East of the Hill. Ranney Hill from David Lake where the trail first breaks-out into a vantage view. At sunrise in December.

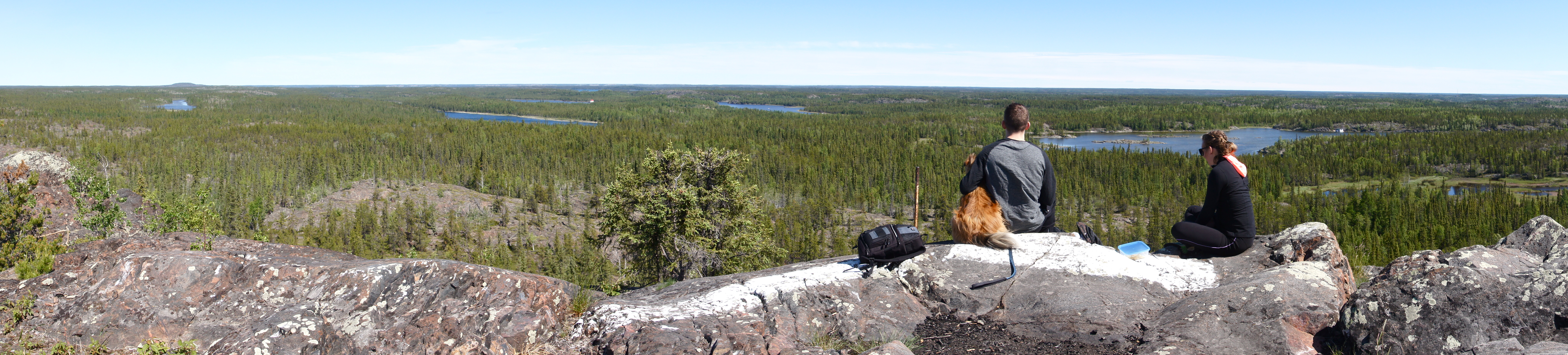
Summit looking east. From the summit of Ranney Hill, Northwest Territories looking east northeast across David Lake to the right, Vee Lake in the center, and Rater Lake on the left in a direct line with Berry Hill.

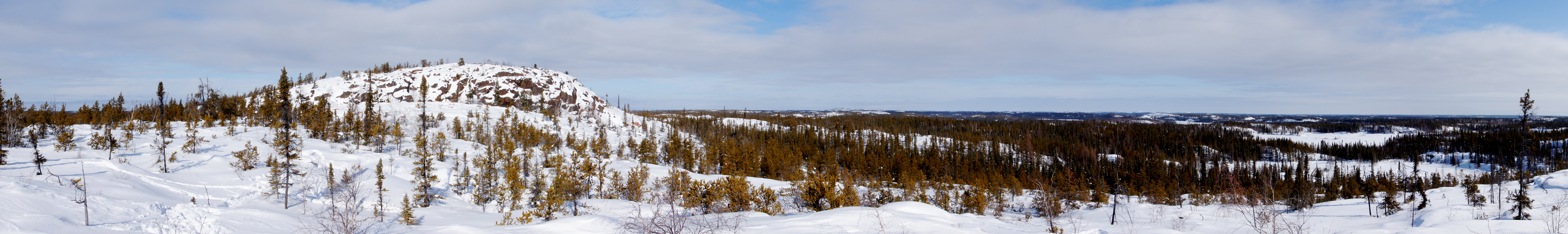
Southeast of the hill. Looking northwest at Ranney Hill from 200 meters away.

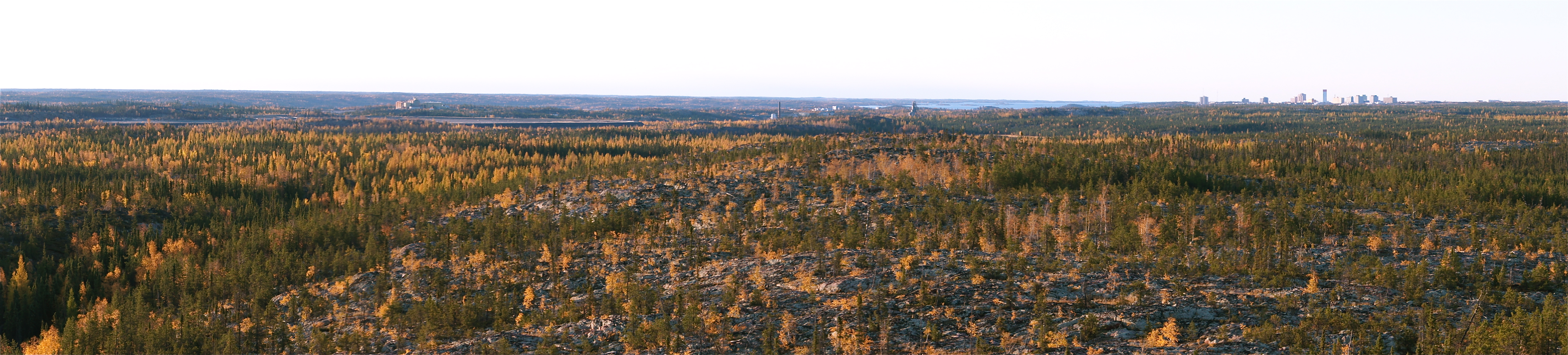
Summit looking south. Viewing Yellowknife (far right) to the south from the summit of Ranney Hill.
