= Yellowknife =

Capital city of the Northwest Territories, Canada

Yellowknife Sǫǫ̀mbak'è (Tlicho)
- City and territorial capital
- City of Yellowknife
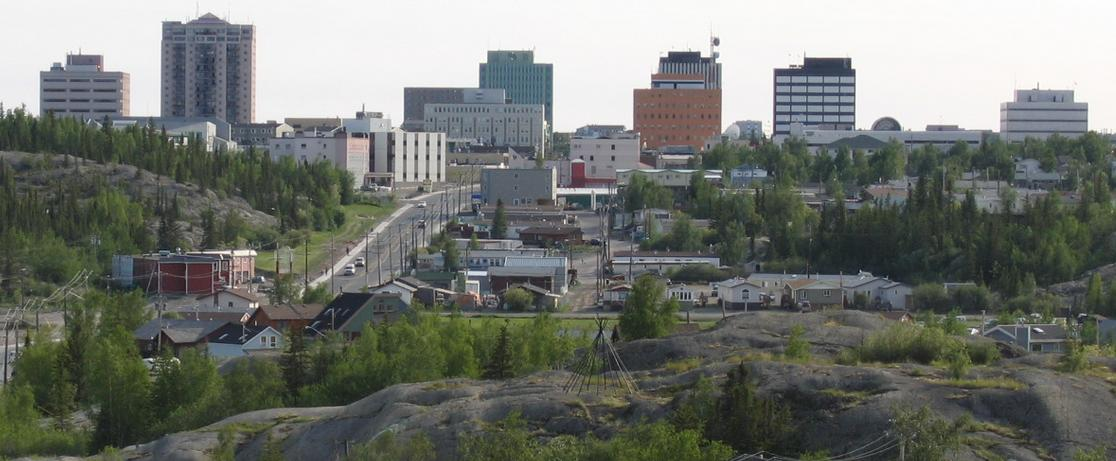
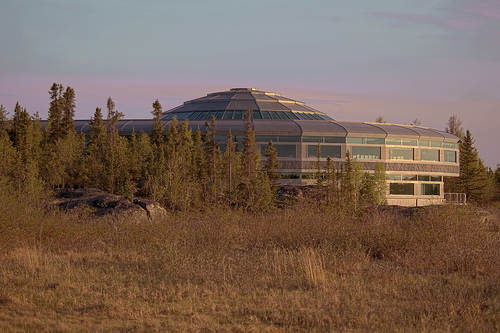
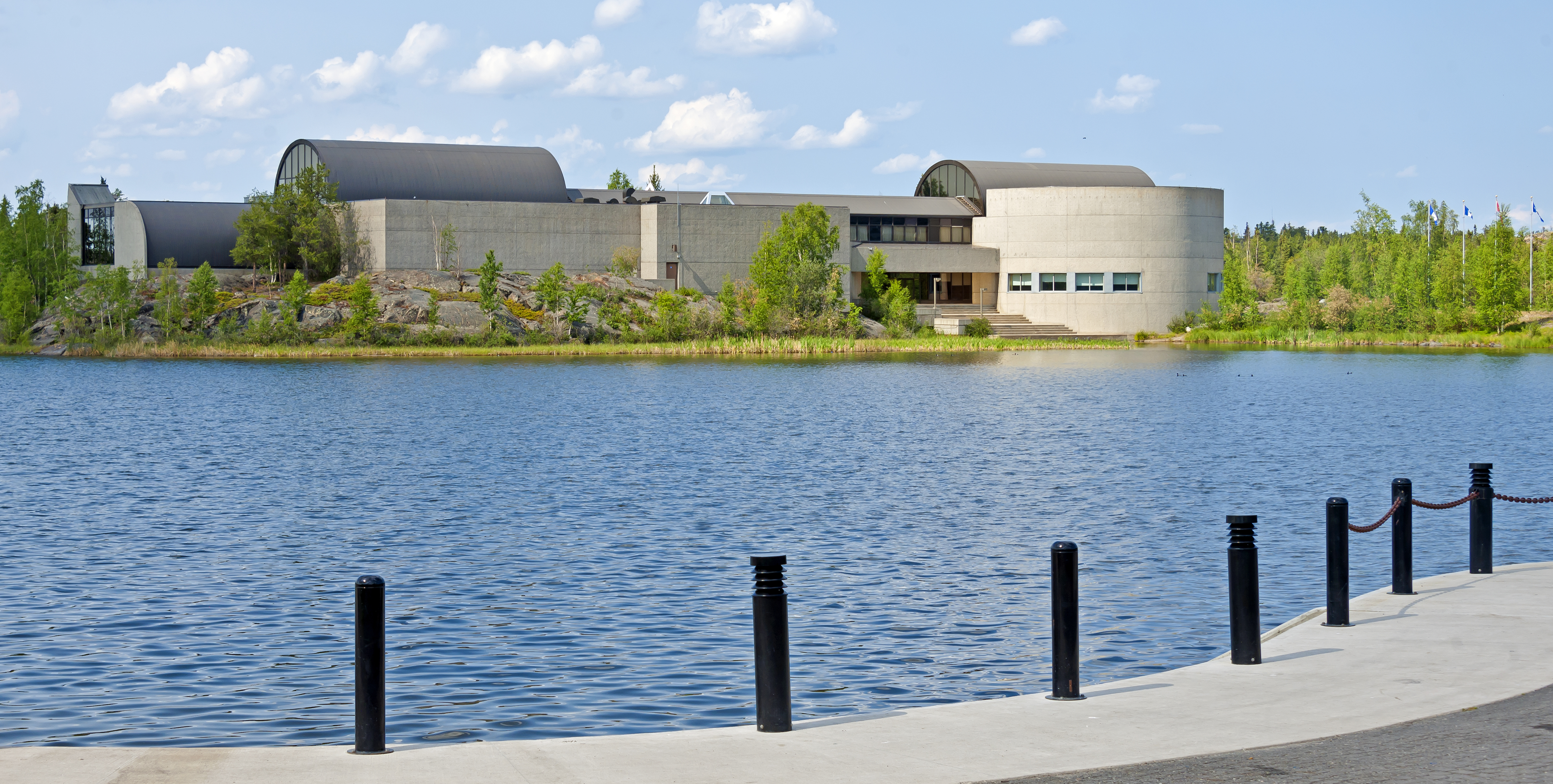
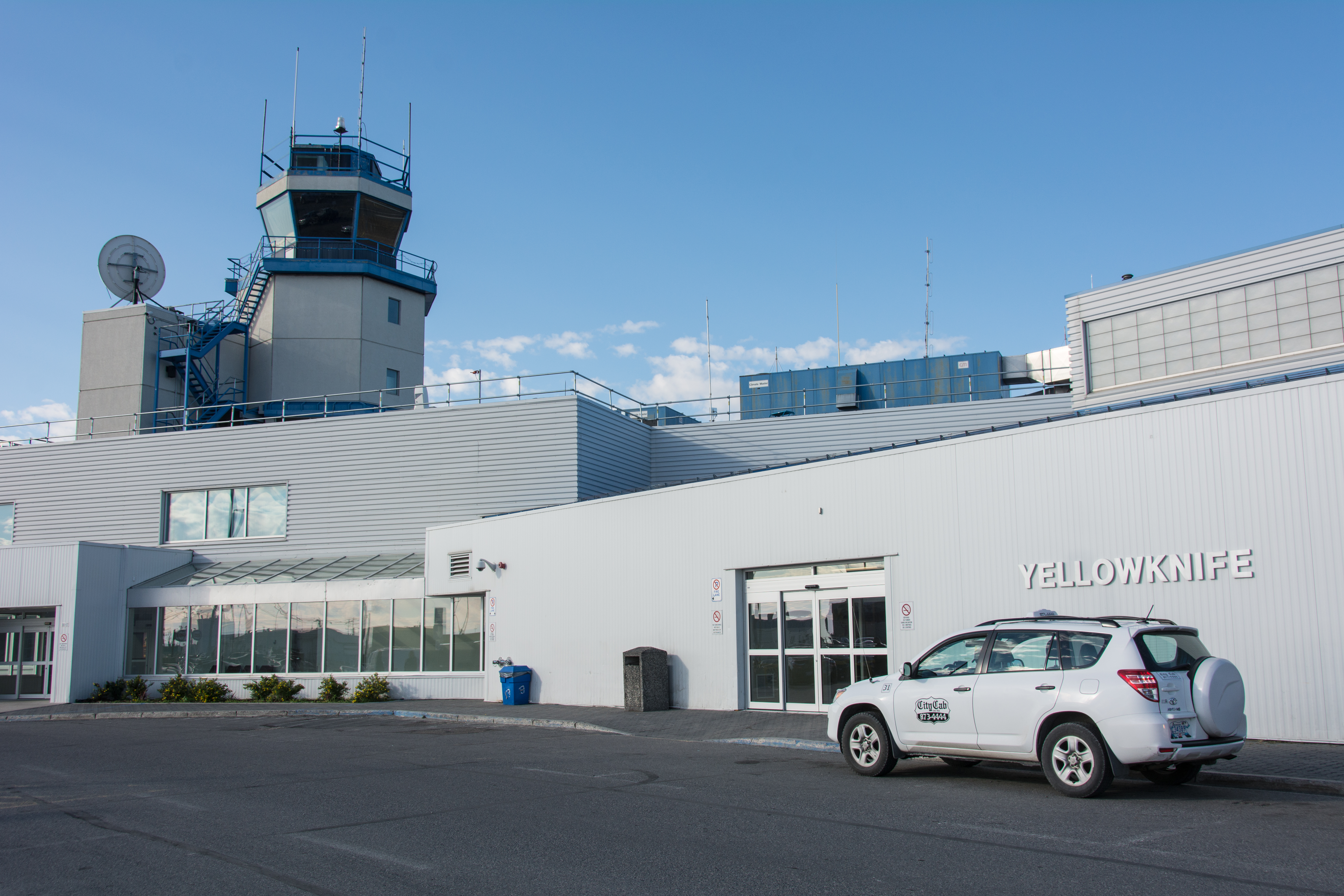
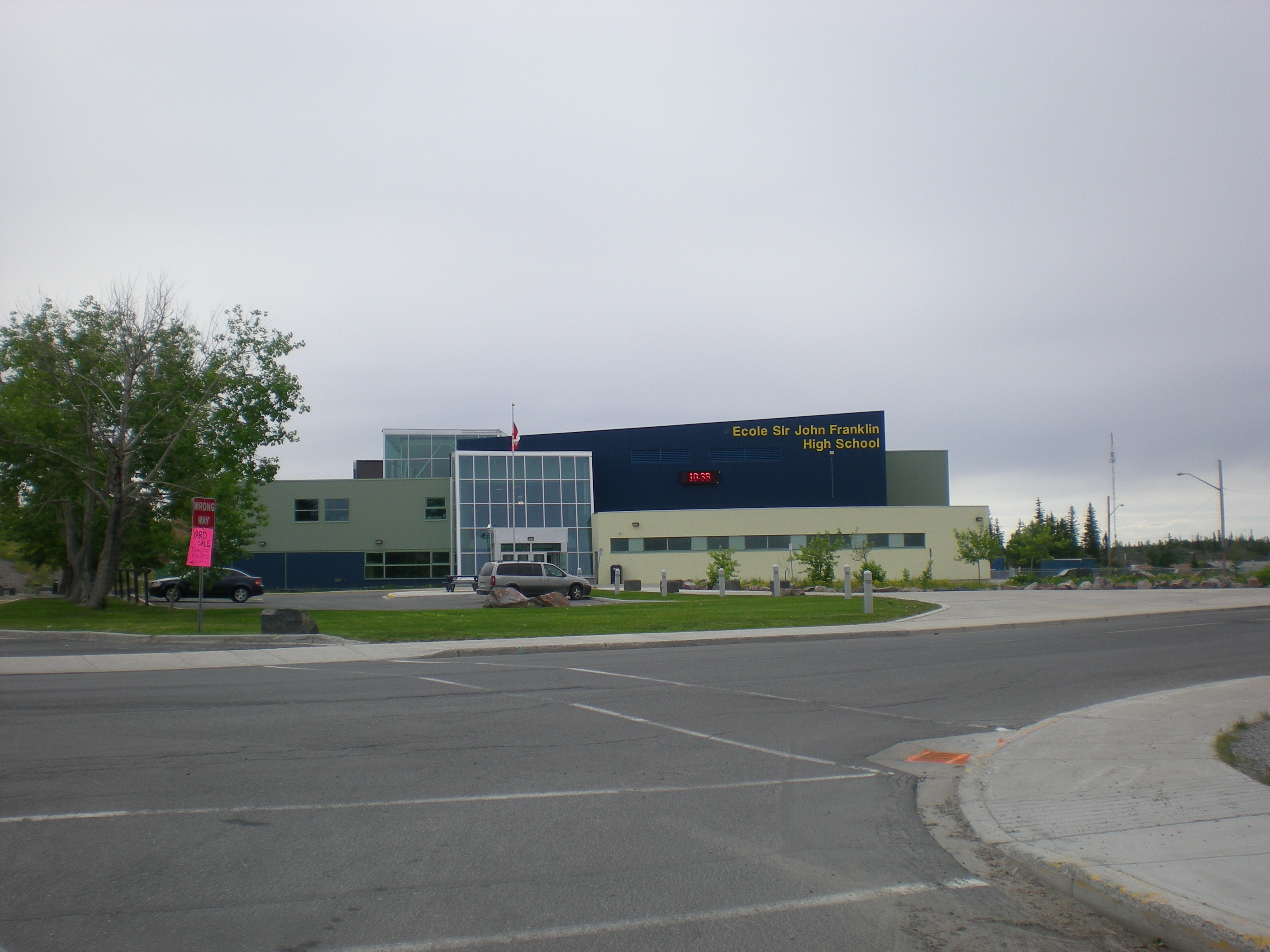
- Downtown Yellowknife Northwest Territories Legislative Building Prince of Wales Northern Heritage Centre Yellowknife Airport Sir John Franklin High School

- Flag Coat of arms Logo
- Nicknames: "YK", "The Knife"
- Motto: "Multum In Parvo"
- Location in the Northwest Territories Location in Canada
- Coordinates: 62°27′13″N 114°22′12″W
- Country: Canada
- Territory: Northwest Territories
- Region: North Slave Region
- Constituencies: Districts: Frame Lake; Great Slave; Kam Lake; Range Lake; Yellowknife Centre; Yellowknife North; Yellowknife South
- Census division: Region 6
- Established: 1934
- Incorporation (municipality): 1953
- Capital city: September 1967
- Incorporation (city): 1970

Government
  - Type: City council
  - Mayor: Ben Hendriksen
  - Administrator: Stephen Van Dine
  - MPs: Rebecca Alty
  - MLAs: List of MLAs: Caitlin Cleveland; Robert Hawkins; Shauna Morgan; Julian Morse; Kate Reid; Kieron Testart; Caroline Wawzonek
  - Senator: Margaret Dawn Anderson

Area (land only)
  - Total: 134.15 km^{2} (51.80 sq mi)
  - Land: 103.37 km^{2} (39.91 sq mi)
  - Water: 30.78 km^{2} (11.88 sq mi)
  - Population centre: 18.11 km^{2} (6.99 sq mi)
- Elevation: 206 m (676 ft)

Population (2021)
  - Total: 20,340
  - Density: 196.8/km^{2} (509.6/sq mi)
  - Population Centre: 19,673
  - Population Centre density: 1,086/km^{2} (2,814/sq mi)
- Demonym: Yellowknifer
- Time zone: UTC−06:00 (Northwest Territories Time)
- Forward sortation area: X1A
- Area code: 867
  - Living cost (2018): 122.5^{A}
- Website: yellowknife.ca
- Sources: 1. Department of Municipal and Community Affairs; 2. Prince of Wales Northern Heritage Centre; 3. Yellowknife profile at the Legislative Assembly; 4. Canada Flight Supplement; 5. ^A2018 figure based on Edmonton = 100

Yellowknife (Note: /ˈjɛloʊnaɪf/; Tlicho: Sǫǫ̀mbak’è)) is the capital, largest community, and the only city in the Northwest Territories, Canada. It is on the northern shore of Great Slave Lake, about 400 kilometres (250 mi) south of the Arctic Circle, on the west side of Yellowknife Bay near the outlet of the Yellowknife River.

Yellowknife and its surrounding water bodies were named after a local Dene tribe known as the "Copper Indians" or "Yellowknife Indians", today incorporated as the Yellowknives Dene First Nation. They traded tools made from copper deposits near the Arctic Coast. Modern Yellowknives members live in the city as well as in the adjoining, primarily Indigenous communities of Ndilǫ and Dettah.

The city's population was 20,340 per the 2021 Canadian census. Of the Northwest Territories' eleven official languages, five are spoken by significant numbers in Yellowknife: Dene Suline, Dogrib, South and North Slavey, English, and French. In Dogrib, the city is known as Sǫǫ̀mbak’è (Athapascan pronunciation: [sõːᵐbakʼe], "where the money is").

The Yellowknife settlement is considered to have been founded in 1934, after gold was found in the area, although commercial activity in the present-day waterfront area did not begin until 1936. Yellowknife quickly became the centre of economic activity in the NWT, and was named the capital of the Northwest Territories in 1967. As gold production began to decrease, Yellowknife shifted from a mining town to a centre of government services in the 1980s. But with the discovery of diamonds north of the city in 1991, that shift began to reverse. In recent years, tourism, transportation, and communications have also emerged as significant industries in Yellowknife.

== History ==
The area around the community is the historic and traditional home of the Yellowknives Dene, the land's First Nations residents. Dettah was the first formal settlement in the area, which was founded by the Yellowknives in the 1930s and located on a point of land on the east side of Yellowknife Bay. The name Dettah means Burnt Point and refers to a traditional fishing camp that the Dene used for hundreds of years. The current municipal area of Yellowknife was first occupied by prospectors who ventured into the region in the mid-1930s.

A Klondike-bound prospector, E.A. Blakeney, made the first discovery of gold in the Yellowknife Bay area in 1898. The discovery was viewed as unimportant in those days because of the Klondike Gold Rush and because Great Slave Lake was too far away to attract attention.

In the late 1920s, aircraft were first used to explore Canada's Arctic regions. Samples of uranium and silver were uncovered at Great Bear Lake in the early 1930s, and prospectors began fanning out to find additional metals. In 1933 two prospectors, Herb Dixon and Johnny Baker, canoed down the Yellowknife River from Great Bear Lake to survey for possible mineral deposits. They found gold samples at Quyta Lake, about 30 km (19 mi) up the Yellowknife River, and some additional samples at Homer Lake.

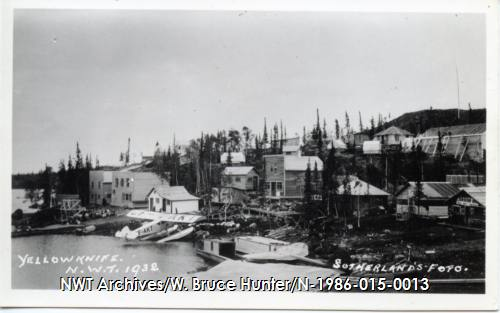
Yellowknife from Back Bay. In the 1930s, the area was home to a number of prospectors.

In 1934, Baker returned as part of a larger crew to develop the gold finds and search for more. They found gold on the east side of Yellowknife Bay and the short-lived Burwash Mine was developed. When government geologists uncovered gold in more favourable geology on the west side of Yellowknife Bay in the fall of 1935, a small staking rush occurred. From 1935 to 1937, one prospector and trapper, Winslow C. Ranney, staked in the area between David Lake and Rater Lake with few commercial results. The nearby Ranney Hill is his namesake and a popular hiking destination today. Con Mine was the most impressive gold deposit and its development created the excitement that led to the first settlement of Yellowknife in 1936–37. Some of the first businesses were Corona Inn, Weaver & Devore Trading, Yellowknife Supplies and post office, and The Wildcat Cafe. Con Mine entered production on 5 September 1938. Yellowknife boomed in the summer of 1938 and many new businesses were established, including the Canadian Bank of Commerce, Hudson's Bay Company, Vic Ingraham's first hotel, Sutherland's Drug Store, and a pool hall.

Yellowknife's population quickly grew to 1,000 by 1940, and by 1942, five gold mines were in production in the region. But by 1944, gold production had ground to a halt as men were needed for the war effort. A 1944 exploration program at the Giant Mine property on the north end of town suggested a sizable gold deposit, resulting in a massive postwar staking rush to Yellowknife and new discoveries at the Con Mine, greatly extending the mine's life. The Yellowknife townsite expanded from the Old Town waterfront, and the new townsite was established in 1945–1946. The Discovery Mine, with its own townsite, operated 81 km (50 mi) north-northeast of Yellowknife from 1950 to 1969.

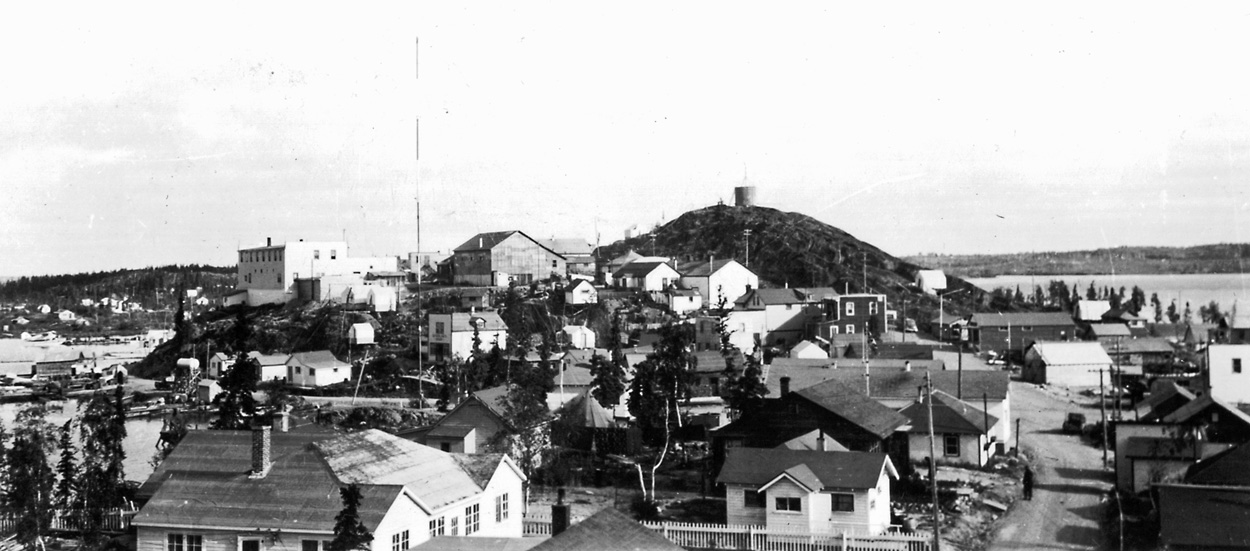
Mid 20th-century Yellowknife; the community was incorporated as a municipality in 1953.

Between 1939 and 1953, Yellowknife Administration district was controlled by the Northern Affairs department (now Crown–Indigenous Relations and Northern Affairs Canada) of the Government of Canada. A small council, partially elected and partially appointed, made decisions. By 1953, Yellowknife had grown so much that it was made a municipality, with its own council and town hall. Yellowknife's first mayor was Jock McNiven. In September 1967, Yellowknife officially became the capital of the Northwest Territories. This new status sparked what has been called Yellowknife's third boom. New subdivisions were established to house an influx of government workers.

In 1978 the Soviet nuclear-powered satellite Kosmos 954 crashed to Earth near Yellowknife. There were no known casualties, although a small quantity of radioactive nuclear fuel was released into the environment, and Operation Morning Light—an attempt to retrieve it—was only partially successful.

A new mining rush and fourth building boom in Yellowknife began with the discovery of diamonds 300 km (190 mi) north of the city in 1991. The Giant Mine was the subject of a bombing during a labour dispute in 1992 that resulted in one of the deadliest mass murders in Canada, with nine deaths. The last of Yellowknife's gold mines closed in 2004. Today, Yellowknife is primarily a government town and service centre for the diamond mines. On 1 April 1999, its purview as capital of the NWT was reduced when the territory of Nunavut was split from the NWT. Jurisdiction for that region of Canada was transferred to the new capital city of Iqaluit, and Yellowknife was no longer the Canadian capital city with the smallest population.

=== 2023 wildfire ===
On 16 August 2023, the territorial government began evacuating Yellowknife as wildfires approached the city, fearing that the Yellowknife Highway (Highway 3)—the main road into Yellowknife—would soon be inaccessible. The government also worked with homeless residents to help them evacuate.

Air Canada and WestJet were initially criticized for high prices and unwaived cancellation fees for flights to and from Yellowknife, but they have since changed policies to alleviate evacuees' financial burden. Both carriers also increased the number of flights to Yellowknife.

The smoke from the 236 active wildfires in the Northwest Territories spread quickly across Canada due to powerful winds and was compared by news sources to the 2023 Hawaii wildfires, which similarly started in a dry and windy environment. As of 17 August 2023, the fire was 162,936 ha (402,620 acres) in size, at 16 km (9.9 mi) distance from the city.

On 19 August 2023, 87 percent of the city was evacuated as of 6:58 am (ET), with only 2,600 of the original 20,000 remaining, 1,000 of whom were essential workers. NWT Premier Caroline Cochrane announced that she had evacuated to Alberta to avoid taking up a space on one of the last planes to leave.

The evacuation order was rescinded on 6 September and Yellowknife residents began to return later that day. An estimated 1,000 people had been flown home by September 8.

== Geography ==
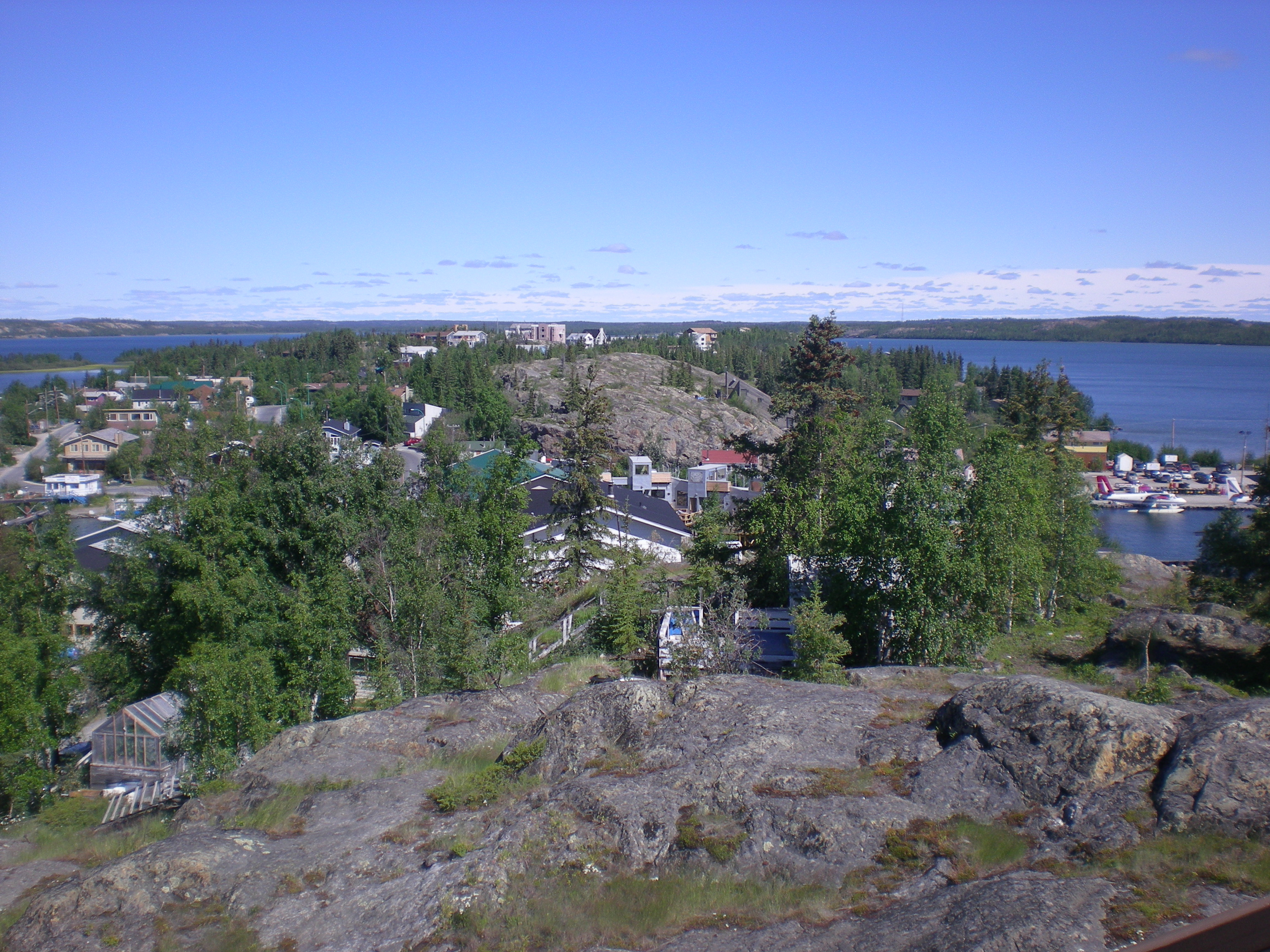
Yellowknife was scoured down to rock during the last glacial period, making the landscape very rocky, and slightly rolling, with many small lakes.

Yellowknife is on the Canadian Shield, which was scoured down to rock during the last ice age. The surrounding landscape is very rocky and slightly rolling, with many small lakes and the larger Great Slave Lake. Trees such as spruce and birch are abundant in the area, as are smaller bushes, but there are also many areas of relatively bare rock with lichen. Yellowknife's high latitude causes a large variation between day and night. Daylight hours range from five hours of daylight in December to 20 hours in June. Civil twilight lasts all night from late May to mid-July.

=== Climate ===
Yellowknife has a subarctic climate (Köppen: Dfc, Trewartha Ecld). Winter is predominantly polar, but rapid heat waves emerge at the summit of summer due to the immense path south. The city averages less than 300 mm (12 in) of precipitation annually, as it lies in the rain shadow of mountain ranges to the west. Due to its location on Great Slave Lake, Yellowknife has a frost-free growing season that averages slightly over 100 days. Sometimes the first fall frost does not come until October. Most of the limited precipitation falls between June and September. February is the driest month and August the wettest. Snow that falls in winter accumulates on the ground until the spring thaw.

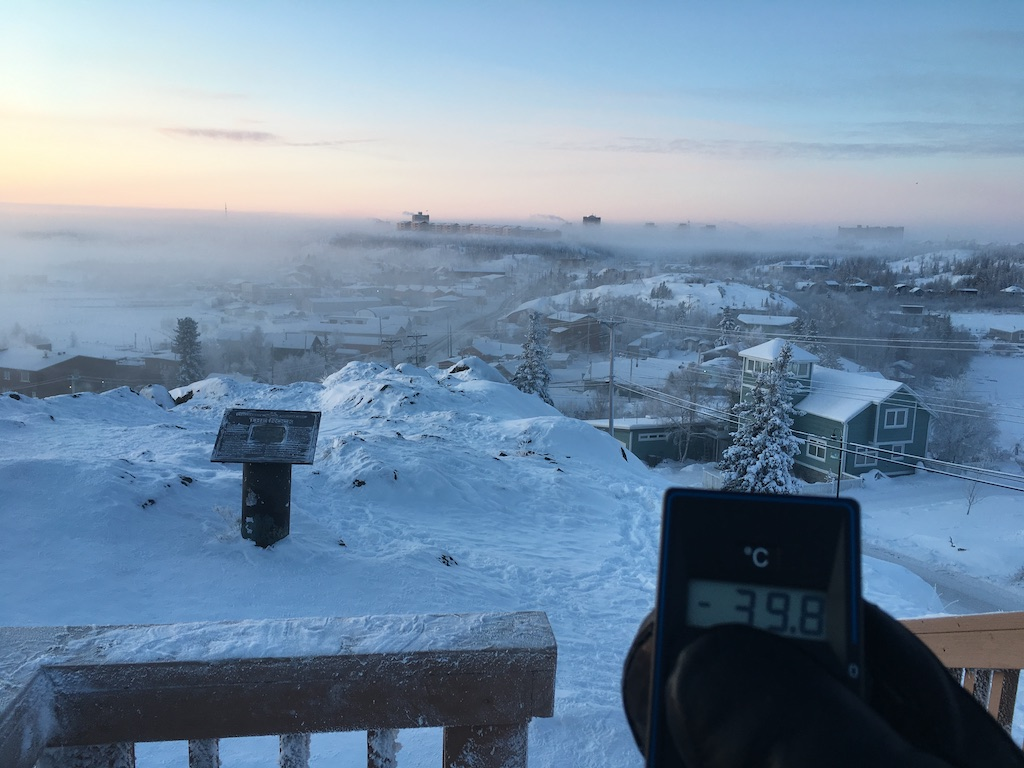
Heavy ice fog can develop on the coldest winter mornings

Yellowknife experiences very cold winters and mild to warm summers. The average temperature is around −26 °C (−15 °F) in January and 17 °C (63 °F) in July. According to Environment and Climate Change Canada, Yellowknife has the sunniest summer in the country, averaging 1,034 hours from June to August. The lowest temperature ever recorded in Yellowknife was −51.2 °C (−60.2 °F) on 31 January 1947, and the highest was 32.6 °C (90.7 °F) on 2 August 2021. Yellowknife averages 2256.5 hours of bright sunshine per year or 43.5% of possible daylight hours, ranging from 15.4% in December to 63.0% in June. Due to its warm summers, Yellowknife is well below the Arctic tree line, in stark contrast to areas farther east in Canada on similar parallels.

In 2014, Environment Canada ranked Yellowknife as having the coldest winter and longest snow cover season, along with the sunniest spring and summer, of any city in Canada.

Climate data for Yellowknife (Yellowknife Airport) WMO ID: 71936; coordinates 62°27′46″N 114°26′25″W; elevation: 205.7 m (675 ft); 1991–2020 normals, extremes 1942–present
Month	Jan	Feb	Mar	Apr	May	Jun	Jul	Aug	Sep	Oct	Nov	Dec	Year
Record high humidex	2.9	6.1	8.9	20.2	28.5	34.0	35.4	34.3	27.2	18.1	6.3	1.6	35.4
Record high °C (°F)	3.4 (38.1)	6.2 (43.2)	9.3 (48.7)	20.4 (68.7)	28.5 (83.3)	31.1 (88.0)	32.5 (90.5)	32.6 (90.7)	26.1 (79.0)	19.0 (66.2)	7.8 (46.0)	2.8 (37.0)	32.6 (90.7)
Mean maximum °C (°F)	−7.3 (18.9)	−5.8 (21.6)	2.8 (37.0)	11.7 (53.1)	21.2 (70.2)	26.8 (80.2)	27.9 (82.2)	26.4 (79.5)	19.4 (66.9)	9.6 (49.3)	0.7 (33.3)	−4.8 (23.4)	29.0 (84.2)
Mean daily maximum °C (°F)	−21.6 (−6.9)	−18.0 (−0.4)	−10.6 (12.9)	0.3 (32.5)	10.4 (50.7)	18.6 (65.5)	21.5 (70.7)	18.4 (65.1)	10.9 (51.6)	1.5 (34.7)	−9.0 (15.8)	−18.0 (−0.4)	0.4 (32.7)
Daily mean °C (°F)	−25.5 (−13.9)	−22.7 (−8.9)	−16.6 (2.1)	−5.5 (22.1)	5.3 (41.5)	13.8 (56.8)	17.1 (62.8)	14.5 (58.1)	7.6 (45.7)	−1.0 (30.2)	−12.6 (9.3)	−21.8 (−7.2)	−4.0 (24.8)
Mean daily minimum °C (°F)	−29.4 (−20.9)	−27.4 (−17.3)	−22.5 (−8.5)	−11.3 (11.7)	0.1 (32.2)	9.0 (48.2)	12.6 (54.7)	10.5 (50.9)	4.2 (39.6)	−3.6 (25.5)	−16.2 (2.8)	−25.6 (−14.1)	−8.3 (17.1)
Mean minimum °C (°F)	−41.0 (−41.8)	−39.1 (−38.4)	−36.8 (−34.2)	−26.0 (−14.8)	−9.4 (15.1)	2.1 (35.8)	7.4 (45.3)	4.1 (39.4)	−2.3 (27.9)	−14.1 (6.6)	−29.6 (−21.3)	−38.4 (−37.1)	−42.2 (−44.0)
Record low °C (°F)	−51.2 (−60.2)	−51.2 (−60.2)	−43.3 (−45.9)	−40.6 (−41.1)	−22.8 (−9.0)	−4.4 (24.1)	0.6 (33.1)	−0.6 (30.9)	−9.7 (14.5)	−28.9 (−20.0)	−44.4 (−47.9)	−48.3 (−54.9)	−51.2 (−60.2)
Record low wind chill	−64.0	−61.0	−56.8	−53.2	−31.8	−11.2	0.0	−4.8	−16.4	−36.3	−54.7	−58.9	−64.0
Average precipitation mm (inches)	15.0 (0.59)	11.0 (0.43)	14.1 (0.56)	11.6 (0.46)	16.3 (0.64)	28.9 (1.14)	40.4 (1.59)	44.0 (1.73)	43.0 (1.69)	28.8 (1.13)	25.8 (1.02)	15.1 (0.59)	293.9 (11.57)
Average rainfall mm (inches)	0.0 (0.0)	0.0 (0.0)	0.2 (0.01)	2.9 (0.11)	12.2 (0.48)	28.0 (1.10)	40.4 (1.59)	44.0 (1.73)	39.9 (1.57)	12.0 (0.47)	0.5 (0.02)	0.0 (0.0)	180.2 (7.09)
Average snowfall cm (inches)	21.7 (8.5)	16.1 (6.3)	19.2 (7.6)	9.9 (3.9)	4.5 (1.8)	0.0 (0.0)	0.0 (0.0)	0.0 (0.0)	3.0 (1.2)	20.1 (7.9)	36.9 (14.5)	23.7 (9.3)	155.0 (61.0)
Average precipitation days (≥ 0.2 mm)	11.1	9.3	8.6	4.8	5.7	7.0	9.5	11.2	12.2	13.7	14.6	11.5	119.1
Average rainy days (≥ 0.2 mm)	0.09	0.04	0.25	1.2	4.4	6.8	9.5	11.2	11.6	5.8	0.82	0.13	51.9
Average snowy days (≥ 0.2 cm)	12.4	10.3	9.5	4.1	1.9	0.04	0.0	0.0	1.2	9.6	16.0	13.2	78.2
Average relative humidity (%) (at 15:00 LST)	68.5	64.6	56.4	52.8	46.0	45.3	49.0	57.1	64.7	75.9	80.7	73.0	61.2
Average dew point °C (°F)	−28.9 (−20.0)	−26.6 (−15.9)	−21.6 (−6.9)	−11.6 (11.1)	−3.1 (26.4)	4.6 (40.3)	8.8 (47.8)	8.4 (47.1)	3.4 (38.1)	−3.7 (25.3)	−14.8 (5.4)	−25.0 (−13.0)	−9.1 (15.6)
Mean monthly sunshine hours	50.6	107.3	188.4	276.4	335.7	373.8	358.0	276.2	157.7	65.0	42.7	24.6	2,256.5
Percentage possible sunshine	26.8	43.5	51.8	62.2	60.8	63.0	61.2	55.5	40.3	21.0	20.2	15.4	43.5
Average ultraviolet index	0	0	1	2	4	5	5	4	2	1	0	0	2
Source 1: Environment and Climate Change Canada (sun 1981–2010) (May maximum} (August maximum)
Source 2: Weather Atlas (dew point, mean maximum, and mean minimum)

=== Arsenic contamination ===
The area has elevated levels of arsenic due to the region's geology and past mining operations. The bedrock contains arsenopyrite, a naturally occurring mineral that contains arsenic, iron, and sulfur. Gold mining in the 20th century released large amounts of arsenic into the environment. The roasting process used to extract gold from arsenopyrite ores created arsenic trioxide as a byproduct, which was often released directly into the environment. The Giant Mine, which operated from 1948 to 2004, left behind 237,000 tonnes of arsenic trioxide waste on site. The mine is located 4 km north of Yellowknife's city limits. The Government of the Northwest Territories is working with researchers to monitor and study arsenic levels in the area. The Giant Mine Remediation Project is a billion-dollar cleanup effort that will take about 10 years to complete. There are several ongoing programs to monitor residents for elevated levels of arsenic.

== Cityscape ==
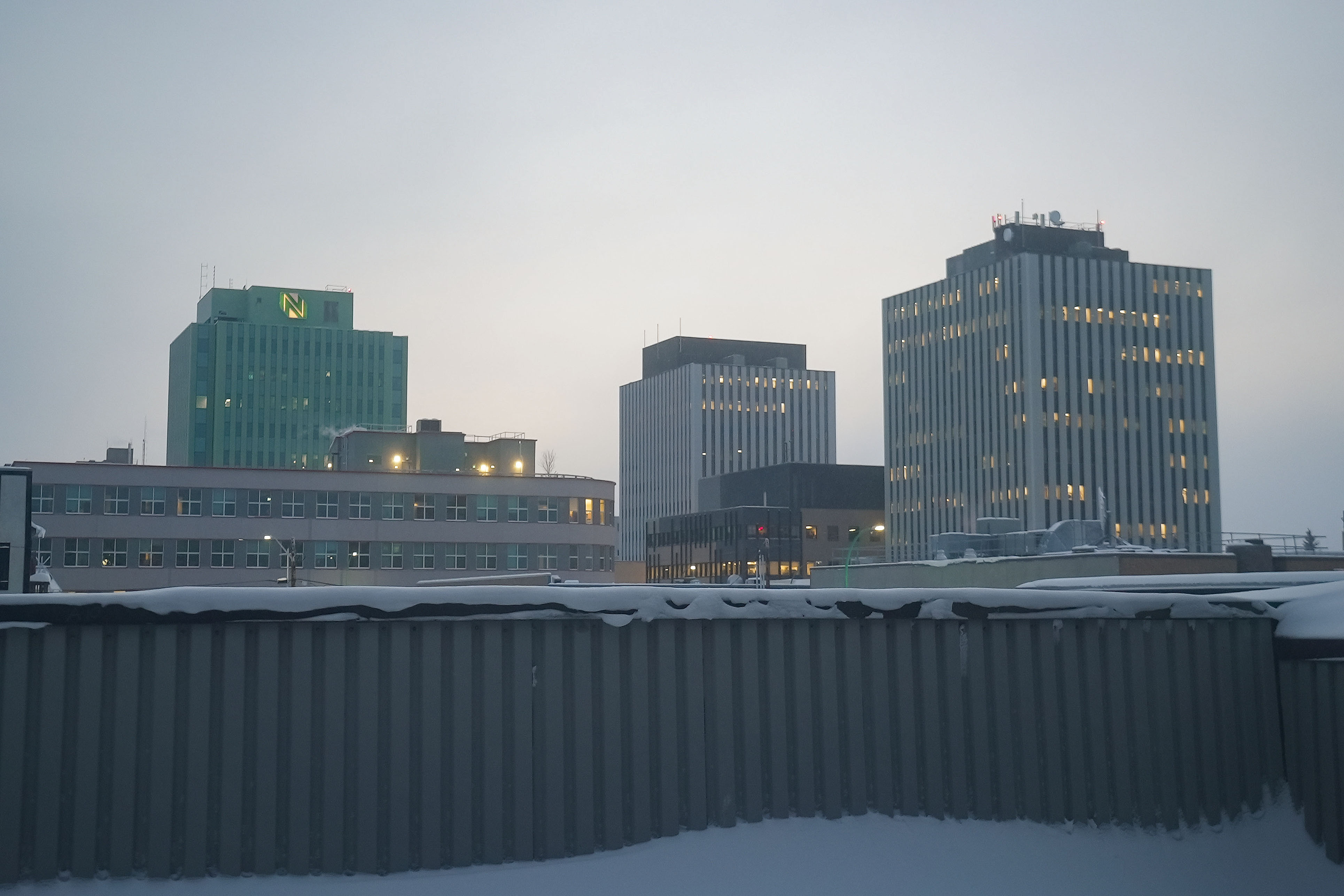
Downtown Yellowknife is home to most of the city's commercial activity

Yellowknife, like most other urban centres, has distinct commercial, industrial, and residential areas. Frame Lake, Niven Lake, Range Lake, and Old Town are the residential sectors, with some of the population living in high-rises in the downtown core. Niven Lake is the only area under active development and expansion. Downtown Yellowknife is home to most of the city's commercial activity, though some retail exists in Range Lake. Industrial activity is limited to the Kam Lake and airport subdivisions.

=== Houseboats ===
Jolliffe Island sits in Yellowknife Bay and has been public land under the jurisdiction of the City of Yellowknife since Imperial Oil vacated it. The island is surrounded by a community of houseboats, where people have been living off the grid since 1978. Their relationship with the city is complex and often strained as the houseboats are popular with sightseers, but their residents live outside the city's tax jurisdiction while still using city services, leading to lawsuits and tensions with the city.

== Government ==
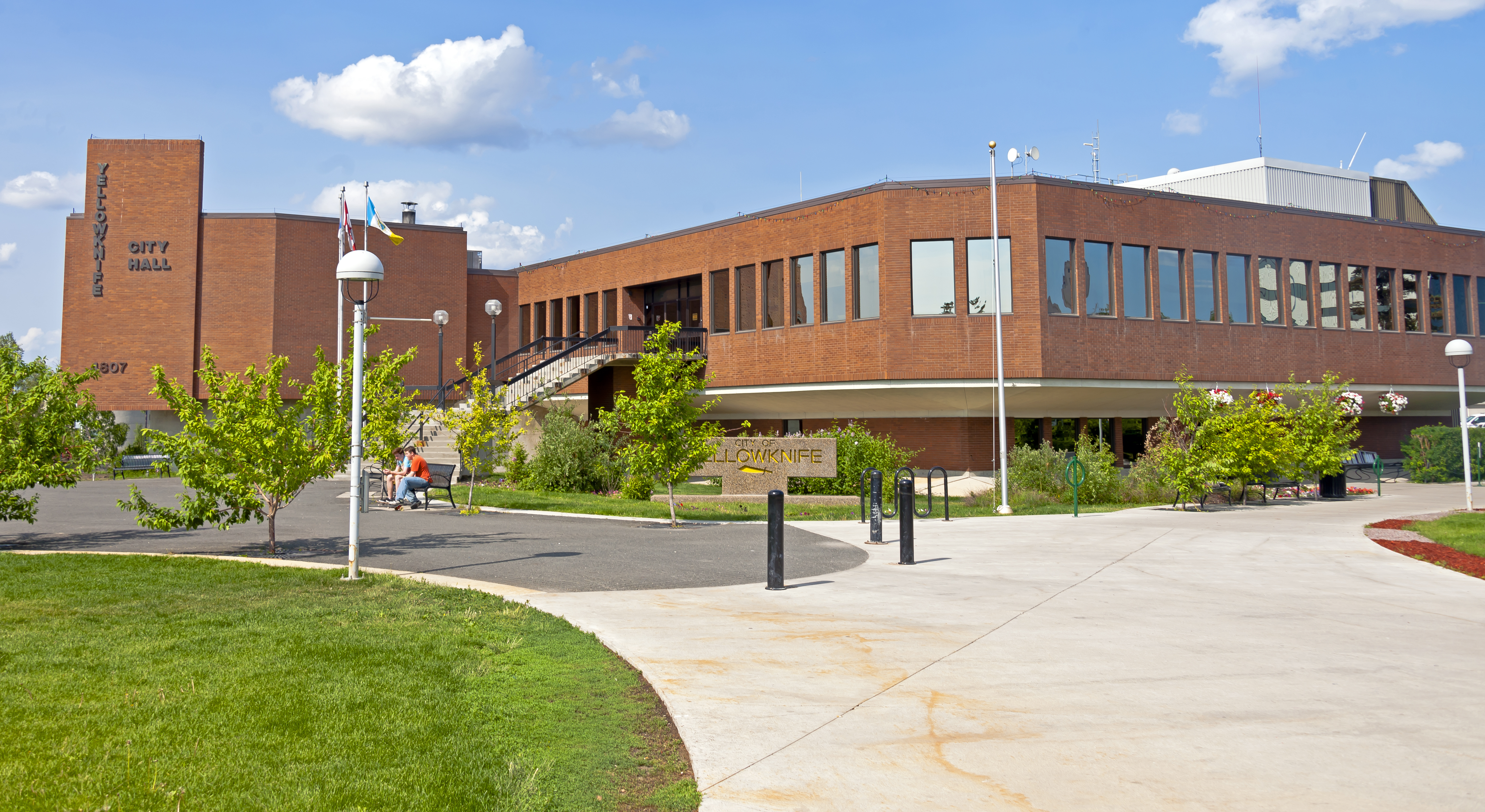
Yellowknife City Hall

Yellowknife has a municipal government system and is governed by the Yellowknife City Council, which consists of an elected mayor and eight councillors. The Government of the Northwest Territories delegates powers to the municipality through legislative acts and regulations. Council meetings are held in the Council Chambers at City Hall on the second and fourth Mondays of each month, and are open to the public. Municipal elections are held every three years. The current mayor of Yellowknife is Ben Hendriksen, a former deputy and acting mayor who was appointed to succeeded Rebecca Alty. Alty, who ran for the Liberal Party, was the successful candidate in Northwest Territories electoral district at the 2025 Canadian federal election.

Yellowknife is represented in the territorial government by seven of the 19 members of the Legislative Assembly of the Northwest Territories. These members, called MLAs, are elected every four years and sit in the Northwest Territories Legislative Building in Yellowknife. The MLAs elect the Speaker of the House as well as six cabinet ministers and a premier, which forms the Executive Council of the Northwest Territories, also known as the cabinet. In addition, a Commissioner is appointed by the Federal Government to fulfil a similar role to that of the Lieutenant Governor. The Northwest Territories is one of only two federal, provincial or territorial jurisdictions in Canada that operate under a consensus system of government.

The Northwest Territories is in the federal electoral riding of the Northwest Territories and has one Member of Parliament, Rebecca Alty, and one Senator, Margaret Dawn Anderson. Yellowknife is home to seven of the 19 electoral districts in the Northwest Territories, the Frame Lake, Great Slave, Kam Lake, Range Lake, Yellowknife Centre, Yellowknife North and Yellowknife South ridings.

== Economy ==
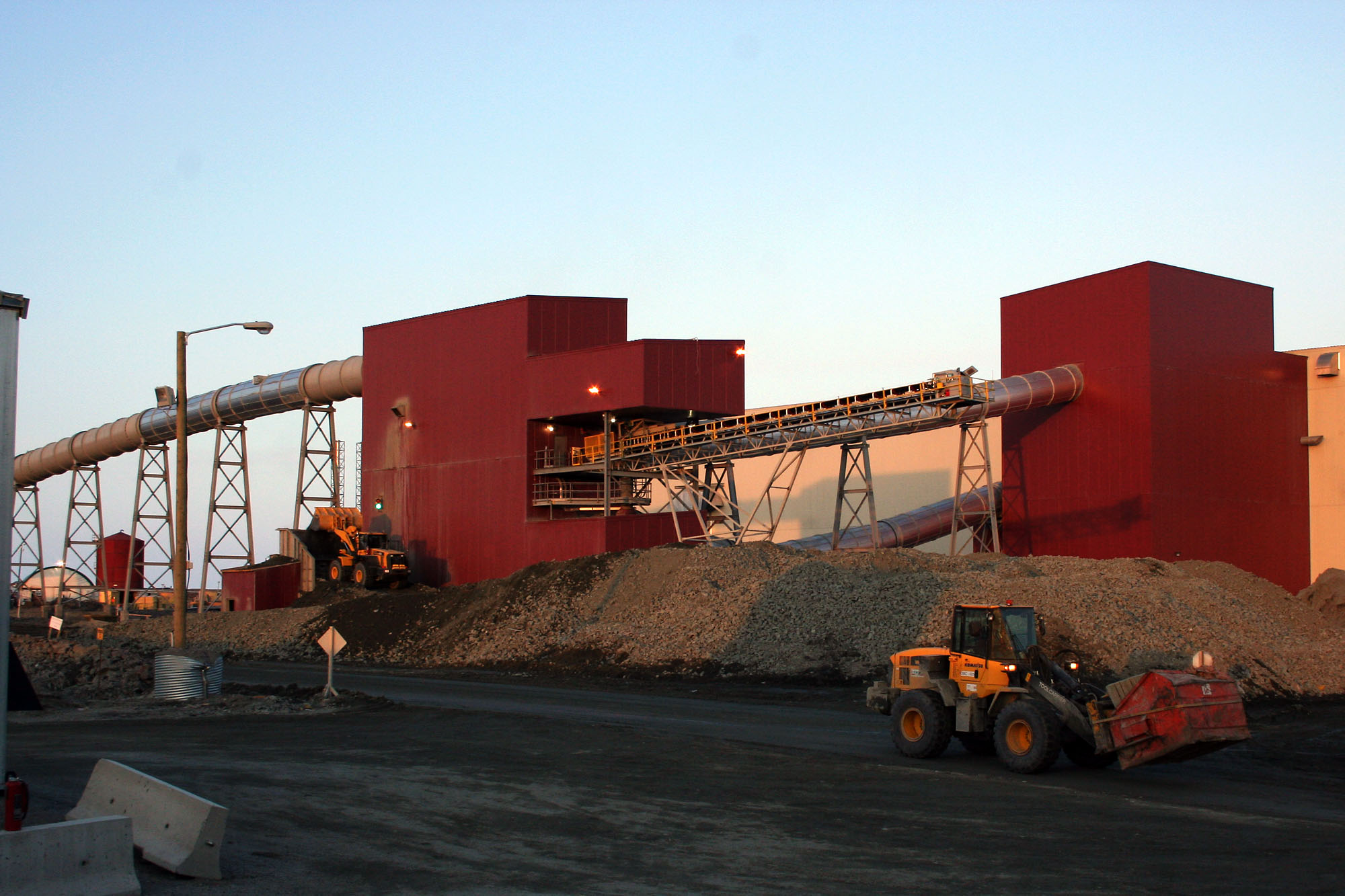
Processing plants at Snap Lake Diamond Mine, located 220 km (140 mi) northeast of Yellowknife. Yellowknife's economy recovered in the 1990s due to a number of diamond mines located outside the city.

As the largest city in the Northwest Territories, Yellowknife is the hub for mining, industry, transportation, communications, education, health, tourism, commerce, and government activity in the territory. Historically, Yellowknife's economic growth came from gold mining and later government, but because of falling gold prices and increased operating costs, its last gold mine closed in 2004, marking a turning point for Yellowknife's economy.

After a downturn in the 1990s during the closure of the gold mines and the downsizing of the government workforce in 1999, Yellowknife's economy has recovered, largely because of the diamond boom; the Ekati Diamond Mine, owned and operated by BHP Billiton (sold to Dominion Diamond Corporation in 2013), opened in 1998. A second mine, Diavik Diamond Mine, began production in 2003. Production from those two mines in 2004 was 12,618,000 carats (2,523.6 kg; 5,563.6 lb), valued at over CA$2.1 billion. This ranked Canada third in world diamond production by value and sixth by weight. A third mine, the De Beers owned Snap Lake Diamond Mine, received final approval and funding in 2005 and went into production in 2007. De Beers also applied in 2005 for a permit to open the Gahcho Kue Diamond Mine Project on the property formerly known as Kennady Lake. The mine officially opened on 20 September 2016, and began commercial production in March 2017. Growth and expansion in natural gas development and exploration sectors have contributed to the Northwest Territories' economic growth, which was 10.6% in 2003.

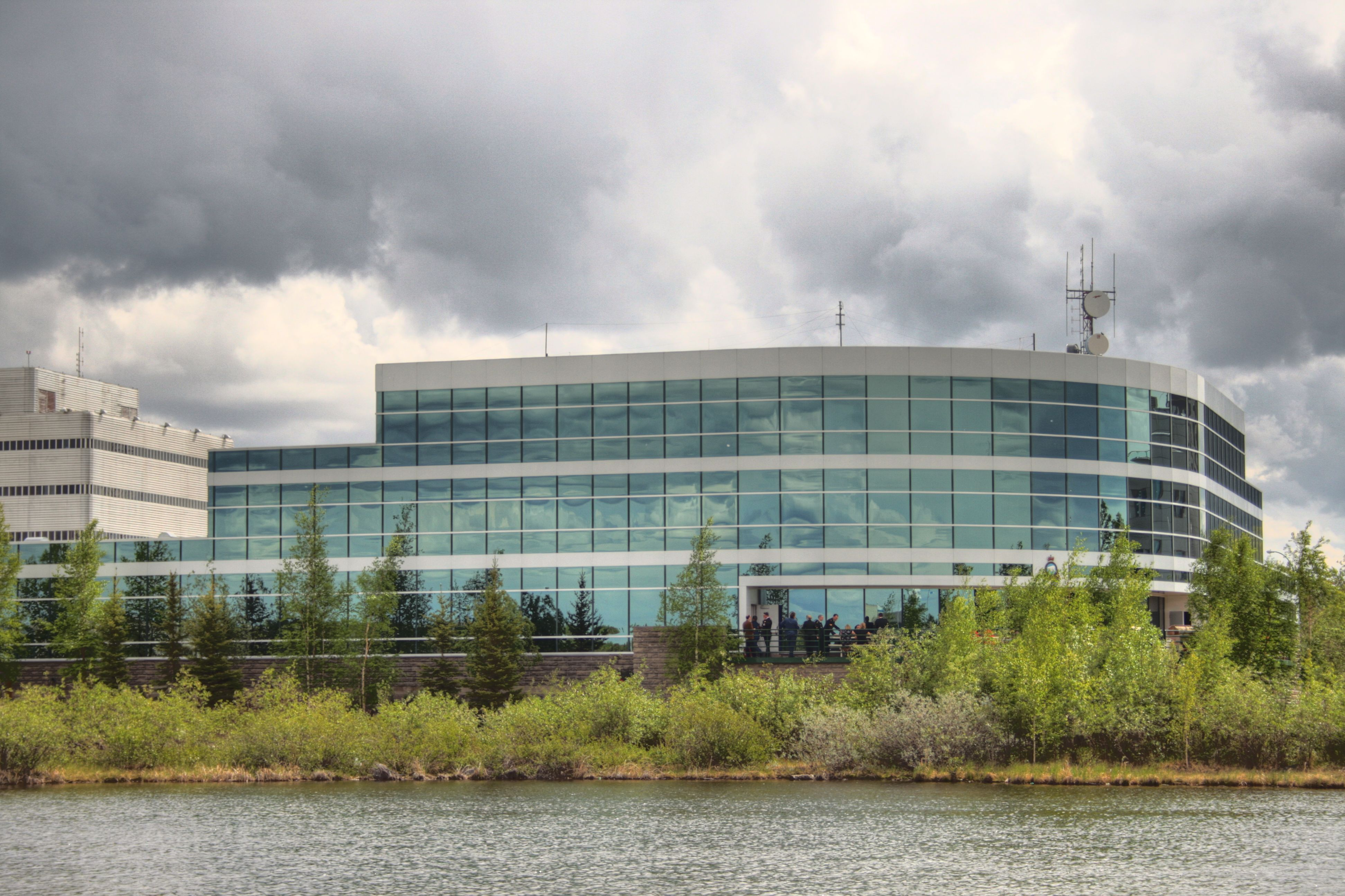
The Department of National Defence building in Yellowknife. The federal government is among the largest employers in Yellowknife.

Yellowknife's major employers include the Territorial Government, the Federal Government, Diavik Diamond Mines, Dominion Diamonds, DeBeers Canada, Canadian North, NorthwesTel, RTL Robinson Trucking, and the City of Yellowknife. Government employment accounts for 7,644 jobs, a large proportion of them in Yellowknife. During winter, the Tibbitt to Contwoyto Winter Road is opened for semi-trailer truck traffic to take supplies from Yellowknife north to various mines in the Northwest Territories and Nunavut. This ice road is usually open from the end of January through late March or early April, and Yellowknife becomes the dispatch point for the many truck drivers who come north to drive on the ice roads. During the 2007 ice road season, several drivers were featured on the History Channel TV series Ice Road Truckers.

Tourism is the largest renewable industry in the NWT and Yellowknife is the main entry point for visitors. Many tourists come to experience the Northern climate and traditional lifestyle, as well as to see the aurora. In 2004–2005, visitors to the territory spent CA$100.5 million.

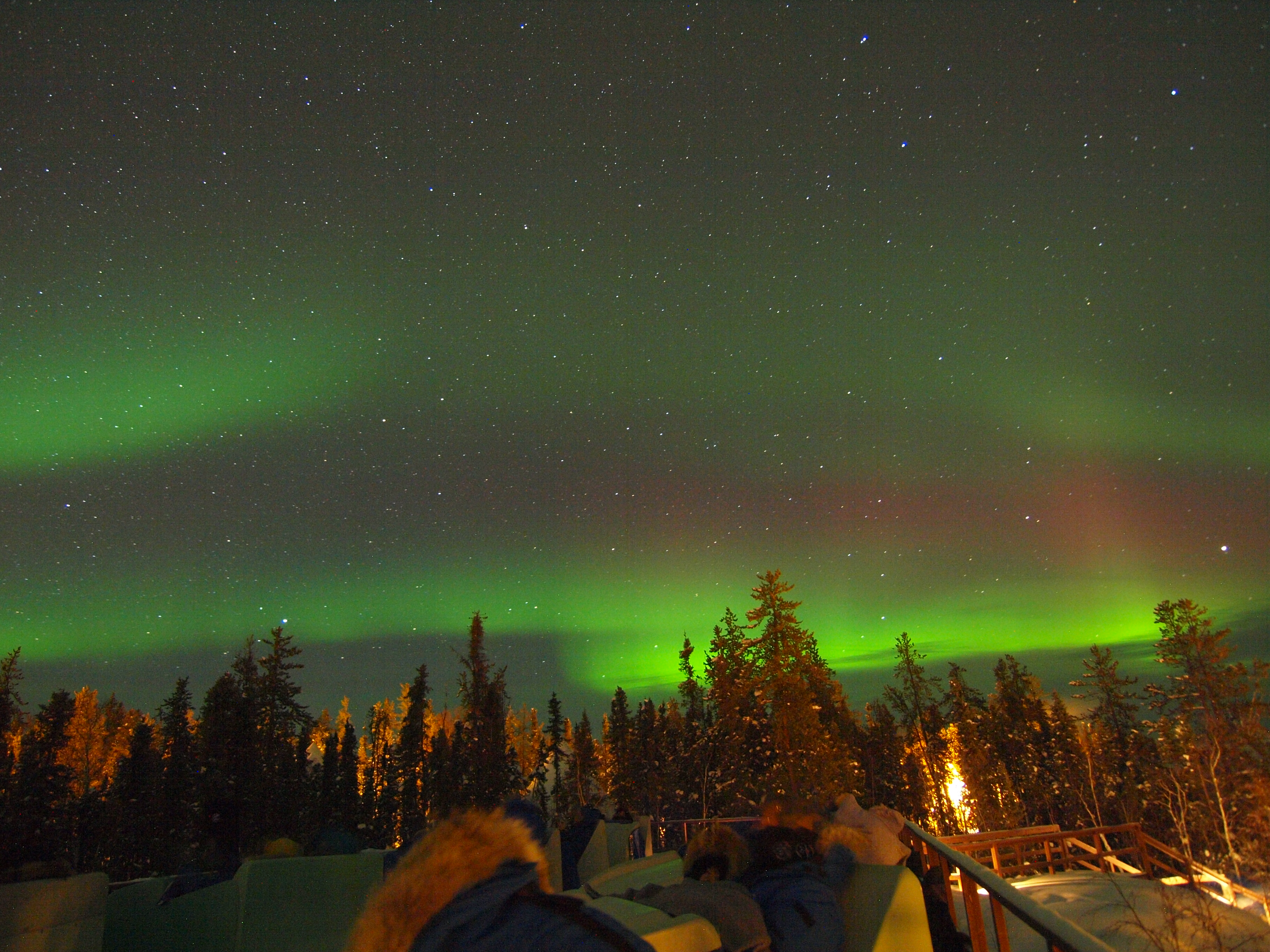
Aurora borealis over Yellowknife

The City of Yellowknife raises 50% of its operating revenue through property taxation. Both Yellowknife Education District No. 1 and Yellowknife Catholic School Board also part of their operating revenue through property taxation. Property taxes in Yellowknife are calculated by property assessment and the municipal and education mill rates. Mill rates in 2005 were 13.84 (residential) and 19.87 (commercial).

Canadian North, a regional airline, was headquartered in Yellowknife, in the Northwest Tower in downtown. The airline announced that when its lease expired in August 2013, it would vacate the office and move it and 20 employees out of Yellowknife. The airline is now headquartered in Calgary.

=== Former regional mines ===
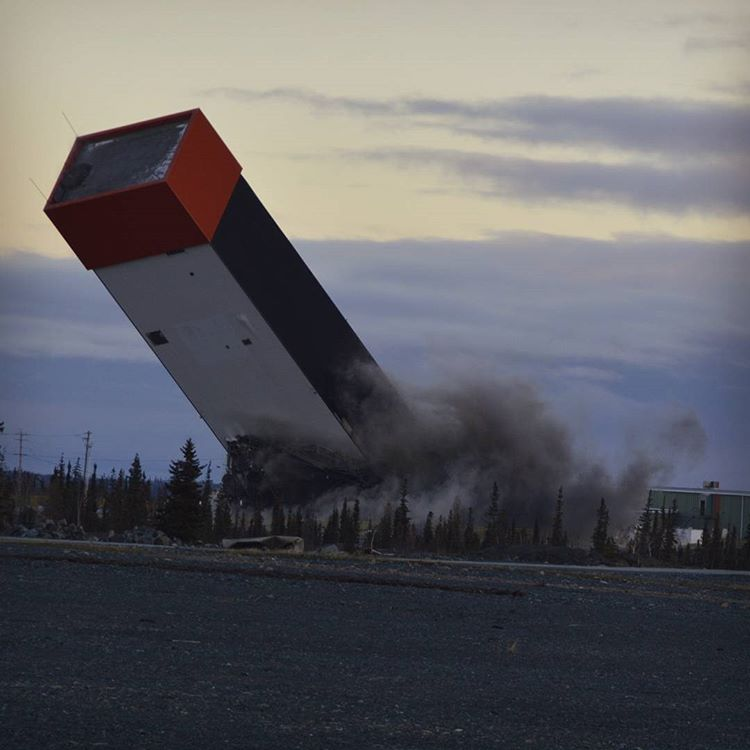
Demolition of the headframe at Con Mine in 2016. The gold mine, just south of the city limits, was in operation from 1938 to 2003. The headframe was the tallest building in the NWT until October 2016.

Yellowknife was originally established as a supply centre for numerous gold mines operating in the region in the late 1930s and early 1940s. The following is a list of the major mines, all of which are now closed. There were also tungsten, tantalum and uranium mines in the vicinity. Most mines in the Yellowknife area are within the Kam Group, a part of the Yellowknife greenstone belt.

Mine	Years of operation	Minerals mined
Con Mine (includes Rycon)	1938–2003	gold
Giant Mine	1948–2004	gold
Ptarmigan and Tom Mine	1941–1942, 1985–1997	gold
Negus Mine	1939–1952	gold
Burwash Mine	1935	gold
Thompson-Lundmark Mine	1941–1943, 1947–1949	gold
Discovery Mine	1950–1969	gold
Camlaren Mine	1962–1963, 1980–1981	gold
Beaulieu Mine	1947–1948	gold
Outpost Island Mine	1941–1942, 1951–1952	gold, copper, tungsten
Ruth Mine	1942, 1959	gold
Rayrock Mine	1957–1959	uranium

== Infrastructure ==
=== Emergency services ===
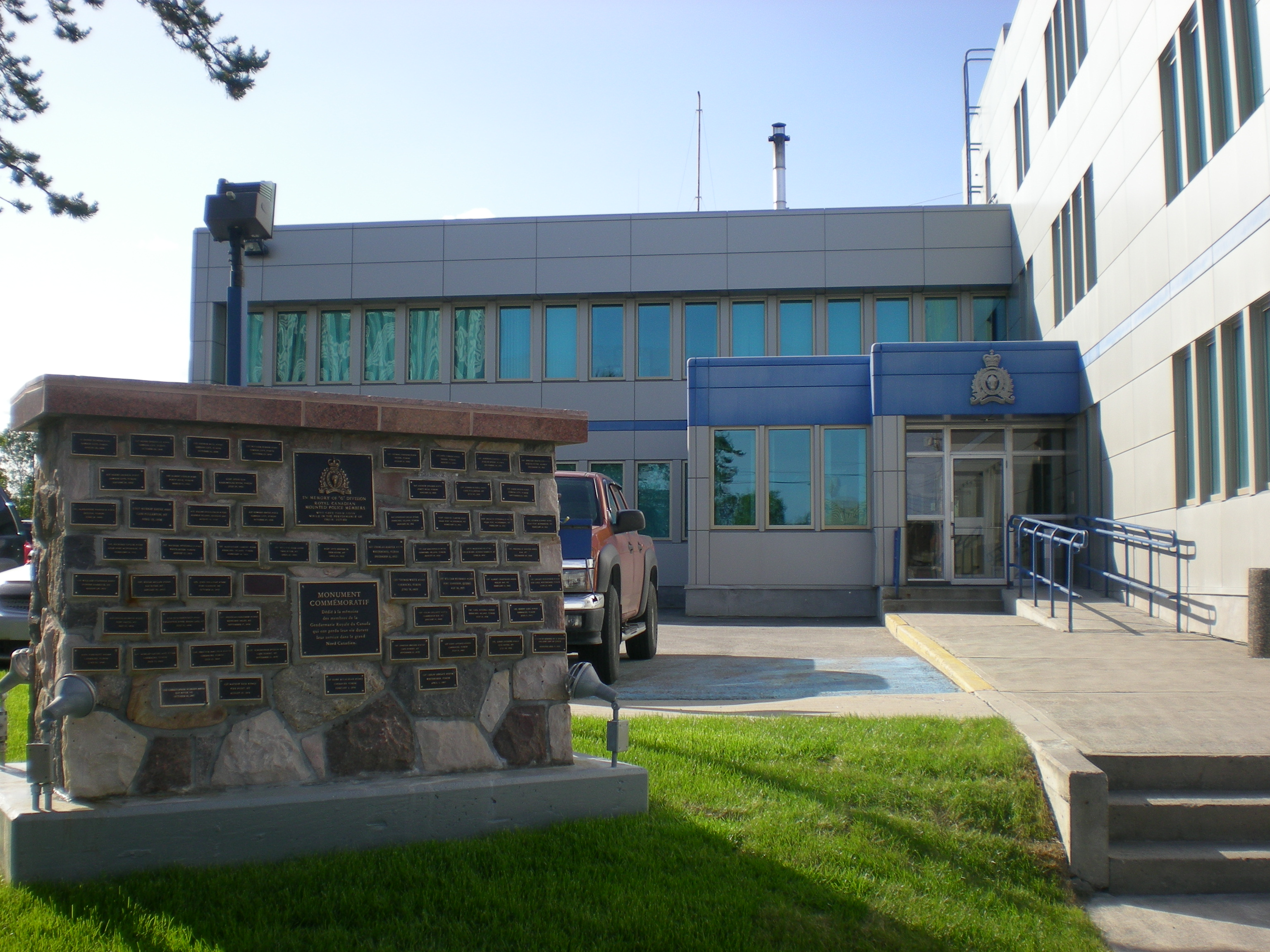
Headquarters for the Royal Canadian Mounted Police (RCMP) G Division who provide policing in Yellowknife.

Policing in Yellowknife is provided by the Royal Canadian Mounted Police (RCMP); Yellowknife is the headquarters for G Division, and houses more than 30 officers. The City of Yellowknife Municipal Enforcement Division (MED) is responsible for municipal bylaw infractions and traffic infractions (within city limits). The Yellowknife Fire Department handles the city's fire, ambulance, rescue, and hazardous materials responses. Implementation of 911 services in Yellowknife has been a point of debate (as of 2019, 911 was enabled in the city). Through a partnership with five other Northwest Territories communities, the cost of installation is estimated at $1 million a year. On several occasions emergency services have been misdirected or improperly dispatched. Health services are provided through the local Stanton Territorial Hospital. The Yellowknife Primary Care Centre has a broad range of practitioners, including physicians, nurse practitioners, nurses, counsellors, and dieticians. Services provided at the Yellowknife Primary Care Centre include mental health, diabetes education, diagnostic imaging, psychiatry and some home care services.

=== Utilities and services ===
==== Communications ====
Yellowknife's telephone services were established in 1947 by the independent Yellowknife Telephone Company, owned by investors mostly within the community. The system was sold at the end of 1963 to Canadian National Telecommunications, now Northwestel. Northwestel also provides manual mobile telephone service on VHF frequencies, and by the 1990s also provided cellular services that were later transferred to Bell Mobility. In 2008, northern-based company Ice Wireless entered the market in Yellowknife, providing digital cellular products and services.

Yellowknife's television services, in addition to over-the-air transmission begun in 1967, included the Mackenzie Media cable television system placed in service 1 September 1972, which was sold to Northwestel in late 1995.

==== Electricity ====
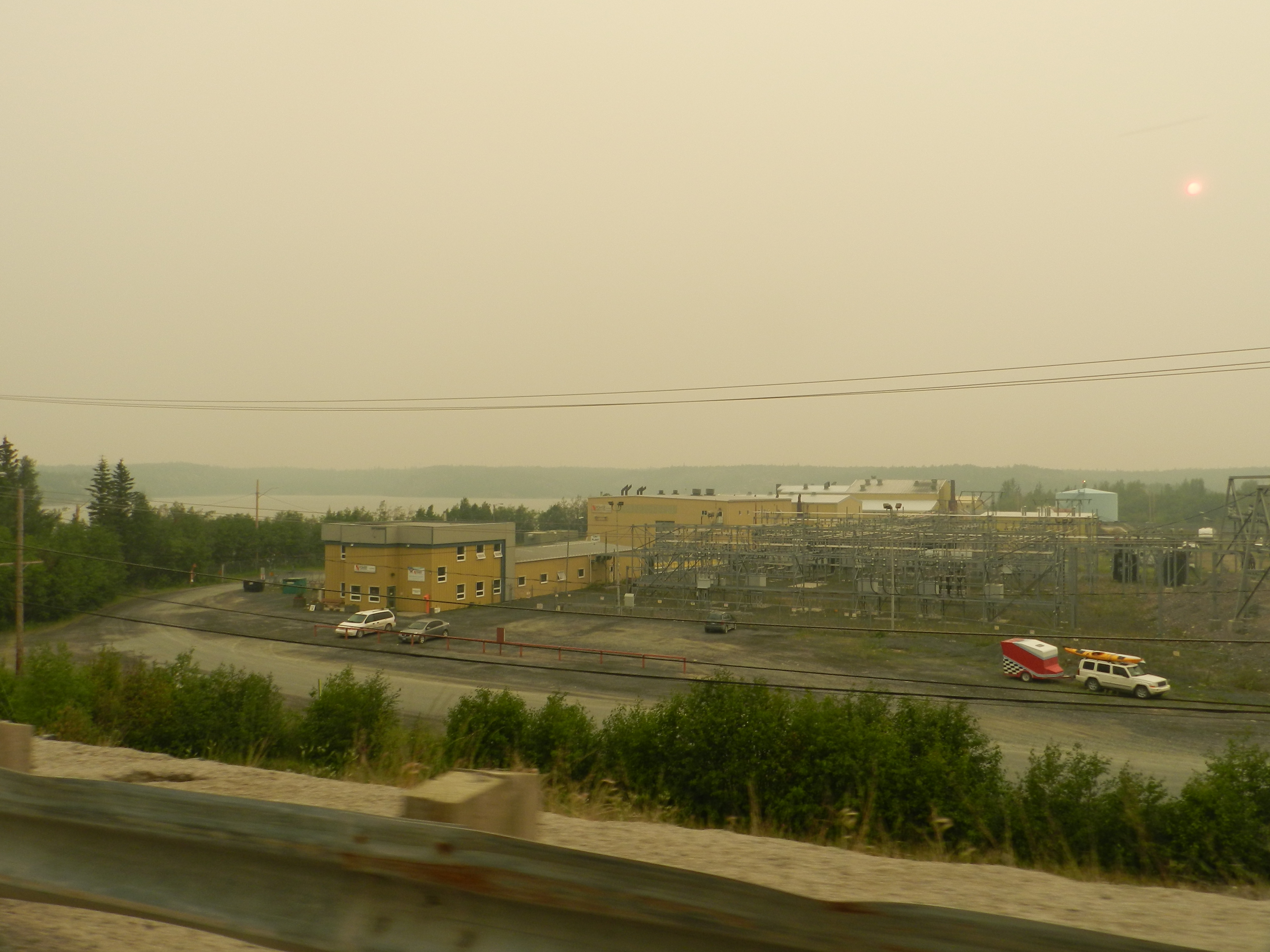
The Jackfish Diesel Plant provides power for Yellowknife. It is operated by the Northwest Territories Power Corporation.

Electricity is provided to Yellowknife by Northland Utilities, serving 6,350 residential and 800 commercial customers. Yellowknife operates almost entirely on hydroelectricity from the Snare-Bluefish systems, provided by the Northwest Territories Power Corporation (NTPC). NTPC's local production capacity is 67.9 megawatts, with 30.89 MW from 10 generators at the Jackfish Diesel Plant, 28.8 MW from Snare Lake, and 7.5 MW from Miramar Bluefish.

==== Solid waste services ====
Residential garbage removal is through a user pay system, in which residents are allowed three 77 L (17 imp gal; 20 US gal) garbage bags per week; any additional bags must have a purchased tag. The City of Yellowknife Solid Waste Management Facility is on the Ingraham Trail (Highway 4) 2 km (1.2 mi) north of the city; salvaging is encouraged, and the dump is infamous for the number of still useful items found in it.

==== Water and sewage treatment ====
The City of Yellowknife provides pressurized potable water throughout the majority of the city, and has a network of gravity-fed sewage lines; trucked water and sewage is provided in areas not serviced by piped infrastructure. Sewage, with the aid of lift stations, is pumped to a series of lakes, referred to as Fiddler's Lake Lagoon, where it is held and allowed to naturally decompose. Water is obtained from the Yellowknife River and is disinfected with chlorine and liquid fluoride is added, but is not otherwise filtered or treated.

== Transportation ==
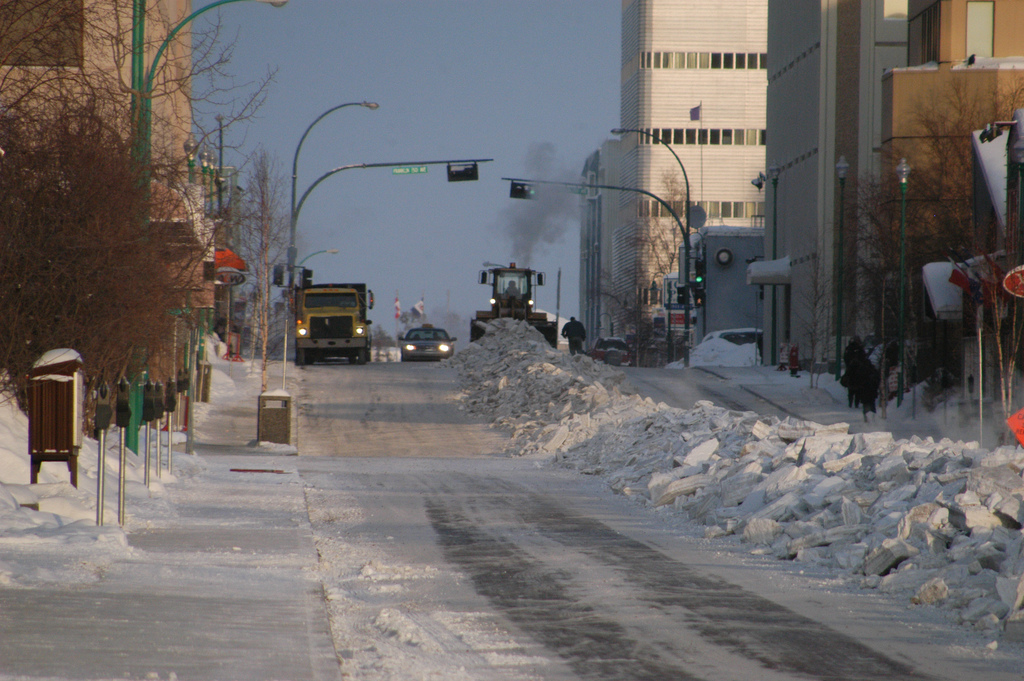
Winter conditions in Yellowknife require regular snow removal.

While isolated geographically, Yellowknife has a modern transportation system.

=== Air ===
Yellowknife Airport is the busiest airport in northern Canada, with 70,699 aircraft movements in 2007 and over 400,000 passengers and 30,000 tonnes of cargo yearly. It has two asphalt runways, one 7,500 ft (2,300 m) strip and another of 5,000 ft (1,500 m). The airport is classified as an airport of entry by Nav Canada and is staffed by the Canada Border Services Agency, but is certified for general aviation aircraft only. The Yellowknife airport is designated by the Royal Canadian Air Force (RCAF) as a forward operating location for the CF-18 Hornet.

=== Transit ===
YKTransit (formerly Yellowknife Transit) is the city's public transportation agency and operates three regular services Monday-Saturday and one express route on weekdays. It is the Northwest Territories' only transit system.

=== Road ===
Road construction in Yellowknife is often a challenge due to the presence of permafrost, which generally requires that roads be regraded and resurfaced every 10 to 20 years. Most Yellowknife roads are paved, and road widths vary from 9 to 13.5 m (30 to 44 ft). Winter snow removal is done by the City of Yellowknife public works department. Speed limits are 45 km/h (28 mph) on most roads, 30 km/h (19 mph) in school zones, and 70 to 100 km/h (43 to 62 mph) on highways. School zones and playground zones are in effect 24 hours per day, 7 days per week. The NWT highway system is maintained by the Government of the Northwest Territories. Highway 4 (Ingraham Trail) and Highway 3 (Yellowknife Highway) run through Yellowknife and are all-weather roads. One well-known road in Yellowknife is Ragged Ass Road, after which Tom Cochrane named an album.

Until 2012, Yellowknife did not have a permanent road connection to the rest of Canada's highway network, as the Yellowknife Highway relied, depending on the season, on ferry service or an ice road to cross the Mackenzie River. With the completion of the Deh Cho Bridge, which officially opened on 30 November 2012, the city had its first direct road connection to the rest of the country. One still-used ice road connects Yellowknife with the neighbouring community of Dettah, 6.5 km (4.0 mi) to the southeast across an arm of Great Slave Lake; or a 27 km (17 mi) drive via the Ingraham Trail.

== Education ==
=== Primary and secondary ===
Yellowknife has three publicly funded school boards (districts) that provide kindergarten and grades 1–12:

- Yellowknife Education District No. 1
- Yellowknife Catholic School Board
- Commission scolaire francophone Territoires du Nord-Ouest

The NWT Montessori Society offers the Montessori program up to Grade 5 at Yellowknife Education District No. 1's Macpherson School.

=== Post-secondary ===
- Aurora College
- Collège nordique francophone
- Dechinta Centre for Research and Learning

== Demographics ==
In the 2021 Census of Population conducted by Statistics Canada, Yellowknife had a population of 20,340 living in 7,519 of its 7,975 total private dwellings, a change of 3.9% from its 2016 population of 19,569. With a land area of 103.37 km^{2} (39.91 sq mi), it had a population density of 196.8/km^{2} (509.6/sq mi) in 2021.

As of the 2016 Census, there were 19,569 people and 7,130 households in the city. The population density was 185.5/km^{2} (480/sq mi). The 2016 Census found that 22.7% of residents identified as Indigenous. In 2017, the Government of the Northwest Territories reported that the population was 20,834, with an average yearly growth rate of 0.6% from 2007.

The average age in Yellowknife, 34.6, is slightly lower than the average age in the rest of the NWT, 34.9. But the population is slightly disproportionate in terms of age distribution compared to the national average of 41.0. As of 2016, 13.9% of residents were 9 or under, 6.0% were from 10 to 14 years old, 13.1% were from 15 to 24, 34.1% were from 25 to 44, 22.0% were from 45 to 59, and 10.9% were 60 or older.

In 2016, the average household size was 2.7 and the majority of the population with children had either one or two. In 2015, the average income in the city was CA$73,500, and the average income for a family was CA$160,394, with 7.9% of all families earning less than $30,000. Minimum wage in Yellowknife and the NWT is CA$13.46 (2018). Average household expenditures were CA$125,783 in 2015. In 2016, the unemployment rate was at 5.9%; the employment rate for males was 80.1%, for females it was 75.2%.

The crime rate in Yellowknife for 2016 was 46.7 (per 1,000 persons) for violent crimes, and 167.2 (per 1,000 persons) for property crimes. There were 299 births and 62 deaths in 2014.

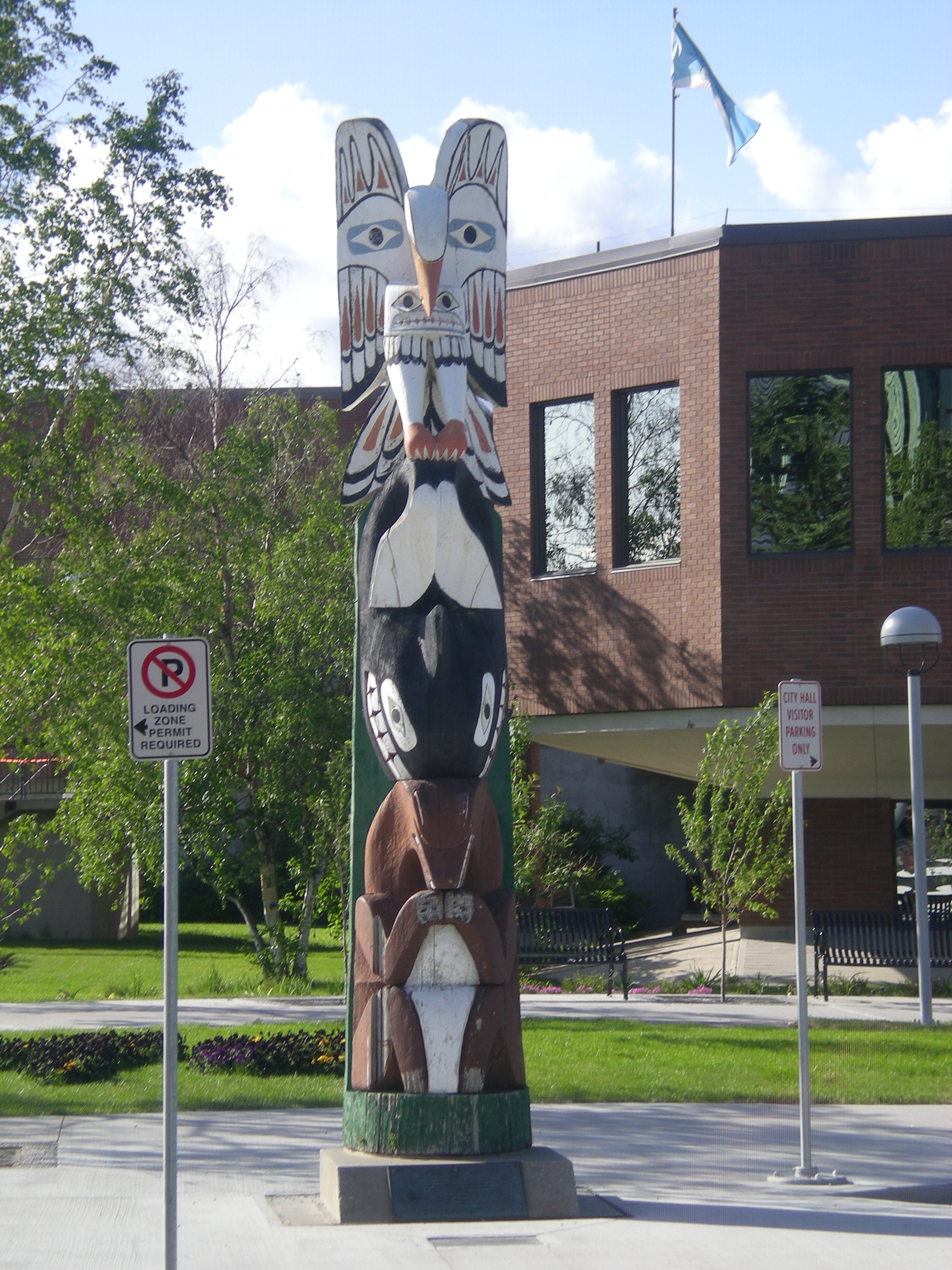
A totem pole at Yellowknife City Hall. According to the 2021 Census, Indigenous peoples make up 24.2 percent of residents in Yellowknife.

Federal census population history of Yellowknife

Year	Pop.	±%
1941	1,410	—
1951	2,724	+93.2%
1956	3,100	+13.8%
1961	3,245	+4.7%
1966	3,741	+15.3%
1971	6,122	+63.6%
1976	8,256	+34.9%
1981	9,483	+14.9%

Year	Pop.	±%
1986	11,753	+23.9%
1991	15,179	+29.2%
1996	17,275	+13.8%
2001	16,541	−4.2%
2006	18,736	+13.3%
2011	19,234	+2.7%
2016	19,569	+1.7%
2021	20,340	+3.9%

Source: Statistics Canada

Annual population estimates

Year	Pop.	±%
2001	17,759	—
2002	18,402	+3.6%
2003	19,198	+4.3%
2004	19,621	+2.2%
2005	19,640	+0.1%
2006	19,519	−0.6%
2007	19,672	+0.8%
2008	19,846	+0.9%
2009	19,725	−0.6%
2010	19,792	+0.3%

Year	Pop.	±%
2011	20,063	+1.4%
2012	20,141	+0.4%
2013	20,270	+0.6%
2014	20,325	+0.3%
2015	20,561	+1.2%
2016	20,849	+1.4%
2017	21,052	+1.0%
2018	21,154	+0.5%
2019	21,183	+0.1%

Sources: NWT Bureau of Statistics (2008–2019), NWT Bureau of Statistics (2001–2007)

=== Immigration ===
The 2021 census reported that there were 3,260 immigrants (people born outside Canada) in Yellowknife, 16.4% of the population. The immigrants' top countries of origin were Philippines (965 persons or 29.6%), India (200 persons or 6.1%), United Kingdom (195 persons or 6.0%), Vietnam (160 persons or 4.9%), United States of America (110 persons or 3.4%), Germany (95 persons or 2.9%), Zimbabwe (75 persons or 2.3%), South Africa (75 persons or 2.3%), China (75 persons or 2.3%), Bangladesh (65 persons or 2.0%), Somalia (65 persons or 2.0%), and Pakistan (65 persons or 2.0%).

Yellowknife is home to 695 recent immigrants (arriving between 2011 and 2016), who make up 3.7% of the population. Of the recent immigrants 70.5% came from Asia, 15.1% from Africa and 7.2% from the Americas or Europe. Of the recent immigrants 40.0% came from the Philippines, 10.8% from Africa, 5.8% each from India, the United Kingdom and Vietnam, 4.3% from each of Japan and South Korea and 2.2% from Israel.

=== Ethnicity ===
As of 2021, Yellowknife has a slight European majority with a population of 11,110 (55.8% of total). The total Indigenous peoples population is 4,810 representing 24.2% of the population (14.6% First Nations, 5.3% Métis, 3.5% Inuit, and 0.8% gave other Indigenous response). Other ethnic groups include Filipino with 1,375 residents (6.9% of total), Black with 875 residents (4.4% of total), and South Asian with 615 residents (3.1% of total) with a total visible minority population of 3,990 (20.0% of total).

Panethnic groups in the City of Yellowknife (2001−2021)
Panethnic group	2021		2016		2011		2006		2001	
Panethnic group	Pop.	%	Pop.	%	Pop.	%	Pop.	%	Pop.	%
European (Note: Statistic includes all persons that did not make up part of a visible minority or an indigenous identity.)	11,110	55.8%	11,595	60.12%	11,830	62.83%	12,575	67.94%	11,570	70.33%
Indigenous	4,810	24.16%	4,460	23.13%	4,780	25.39%	4,105	22.18%	3,640	22.13%
Southeast Asian (Note: Statistic includes total responses of "Filipino" and "Southeast Asian" under visible minority section on census.)	1,645	8.26%	1,290	6.69%	950	5.05%	915	4.94%	555	3.37%
African	875	4.39%	610	3.16%	465	2.47%	310	1.67%	140	0.85%
South Asian	615	3.09%	510	2.64%	125	0.66%	135	0.73%	140	0.85%
East Asian (Note: Statistic includes total responses of "Chinese", "Korean", and "Japanese" under visible minority section on census.)	385	1.93%	450	2.33%	375	1.99%	260	1.4%	250	1.52%
Middle Eastern (Note: Statistic includes total responses of "West Asian" and "Arab" under visible minority section on census.)	215	1.08%	110	0.57%	130	0.69%	80	0.43%	60	0.36%
Latin American	90	0.45%	110	0.57%	85	0.45%	70	0.38%	50	0.3%
Other (Note: Statistic includes total responses of "Visible minority, n.i.e." and "Multiple visible minorities" under visible minority section on census.)	155	0.78%	165	0.86%	100	0.53%	60	0.32%	40	0.24%
Total responses	19,910	97.89%	19,285	98.55%	18,830	97.9%	18,510	98.98%	16,450	99.45%
Total population	20,340	100%	19,569	100%	19,234	100%	18,700	100%	16,541	100%

- Note: Totals greater than 100% due to multiple origin responses.

=== Language ===
English was the mother tongue of 80.0% of residents and 3.2% spoke French. Of the nine official languages of the Northwest Territories 0.4% spoke Chipewyan (Dene); 0.1% spoke a Cree language; 0.1% spoke Gwich’in; 0.4% spoke Inuktitut; 0.1% spoke Inuinnaqtun or Inuvialuktun; 0.6% spoke North or South Slavey and 1.2% spoke Tłı̨chǫ (Dogrib). In total 3.0% of the population said that an Indigenous language was their mother tongue.

Not including the 11 official languages there are over 70 different languages that Yellowknifers stated were their mother tongue. These include Indo-European languages (4.2%); Austronesian languages (3.9%); Indo-Iranian languages and Germanic languages (1.1% each); Sino-Tibetan languages and Chinese languages and Indo-Aryan languages (1.0% each). The five main individual languages are Tagalog (3.2%); Vietnamese (0.8%); German (0.6%); Cantonese and Spanish (0.5% each).

=== Religion ===
According to the 2021 census, religious groups in Yellowknife included:

- Christianity (9,705 persons or 48.7%)
- Irreligion (8,840 persons or 44.4%)
- Islam (610 persons or 3.1%)
- Buddhism (225 persons or 1.1%)
- Hinduism (130 persons or 0.7%)
- Sikhism (105 persons or 0.5%)
- Indigenous Spirituality (100 persons or 0.5%)
- Judaism (35 persons or 0.2%)
- Other (165 persons or 0.8%)

In the 2001 Census, almost 73% of residents identified as Christian while 24% said they had no religious affiliation. For specific denominations, Statistics Canada found that 36% of residents identified as Roman Catholic, 11% as Anglican, 10% for the United Church, about 2% each as Baptists, Lutheran, and Pentecostal, and more than 1% for The Salvation Army. There were also 135 Buddhists, 125 Muslims, and 15 Jews.

== Culture ==
=== Events ===
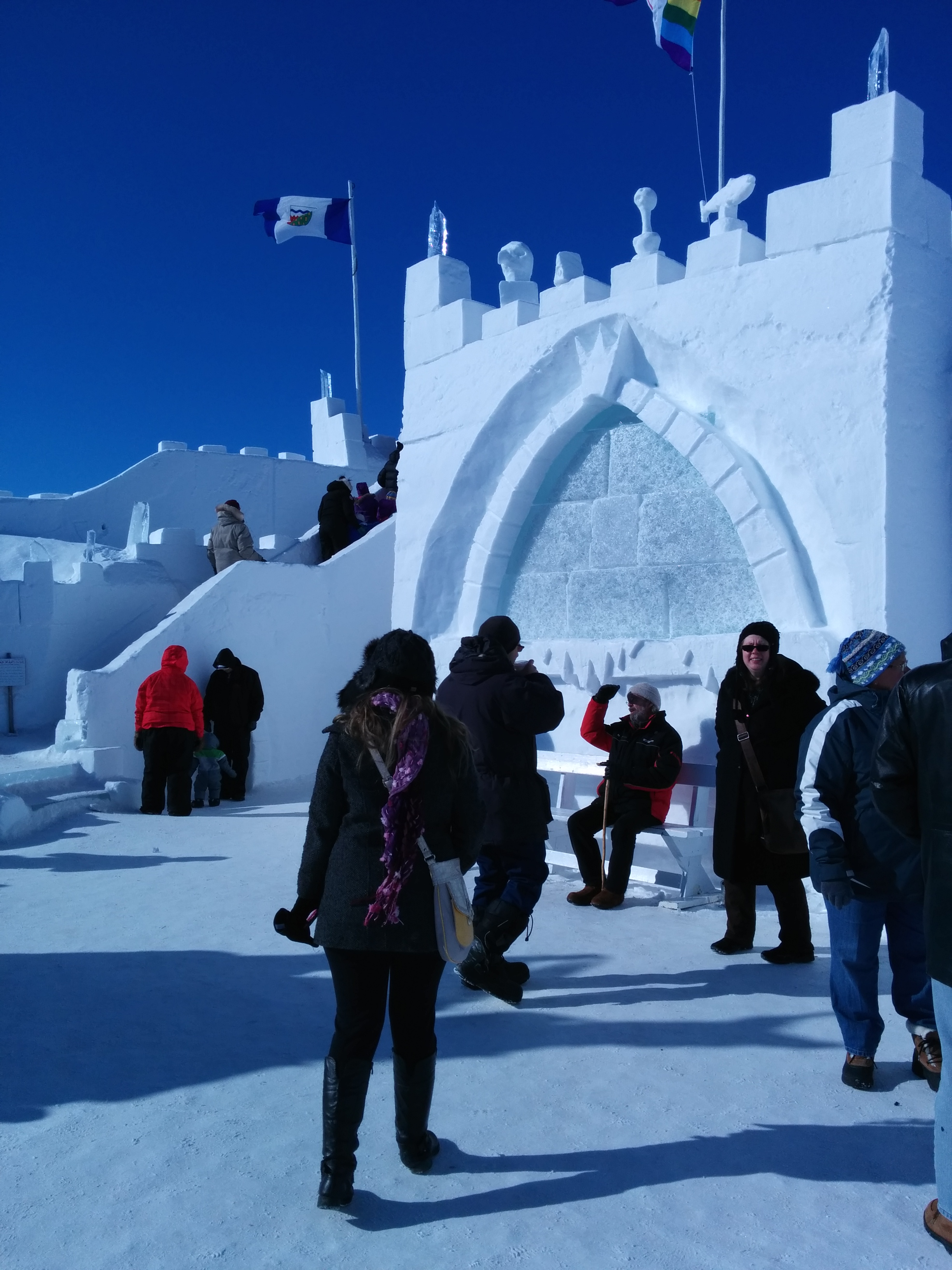
The courtyard for the Snowking Winter Festival's castle. The festival is an annual festival that is centred around a snow castle on the Great Slave Lake.

- Folk on the Rocks has been held annually since 1980. It features a variety of musical acts, not limited to folk. It has drawn acts such as Buffy Sainte-Marie, the Trailer Park Boys, The Weakerthans, African Guitar Summit, Corb Lund, Fred Penner, Stan Rogers, Gord Downie, Tanya Tagaq, Dan Mangan, Sam Roberts Band, Sloan, The Strumbellas, Joel Plaskett, Ron Sexsmith and Hawksley Workman.
- The Midnight Sun Golf Tournament, with games played through the city's well-lit summer nights, attracts as many as 400 golfers annually.
- The Snowking Winter Festival, featuring a snow castle on Great Slave Lake, hosts a month of cultural activities.
- The Long John Jamboree took place on 23–25 March 2012 on the frozen Yellowknife Bay next to the Snowking castle, in Yellowknife's Old Town neighbourhood. Events included an ice sculpture contest sponsored by De Beers Canada, cultural events like Dene hand games, games, live music, a beer garden, food vendors, skating rink, and an artist's market.
- Yellowknife hosted the inaugural 1970 Arctic Winter Games, and has since hosted athletes and artists from circumpolar regions at the biennial multi-sport and multi-cultural event in 1984, 1990, 1998, and 2008 Arctic Winter Games.
- The Old Town Ramble & Ride Festival started in 2006 and happens every summer for three days on the August long weekend. This free outdoor festival promotes local art, culture, music, artisans, dance, storytelling, workshops, tours, children's area and more.
- The Yellowknife International Film Festival is an annual film festival held in the city. The Dead North Film Festival, a genre film festival for horror, fantasy and science fiction films, was also staged from 2012 to 2020, but is currently on hiatus.

=== Attractions ===
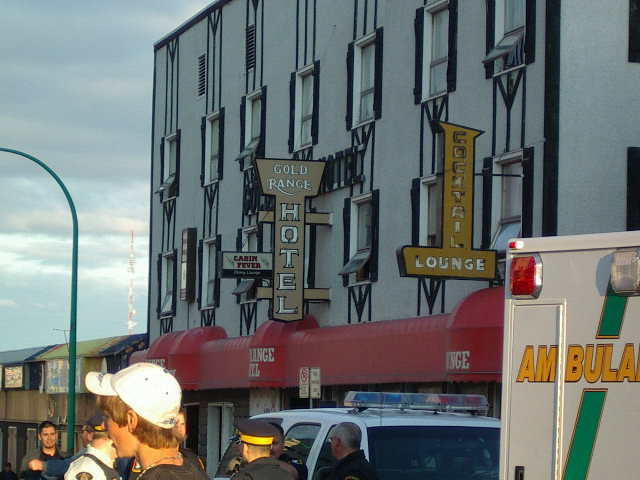
The Gold Range is a prominent hotel and bar located in Yellowknife.

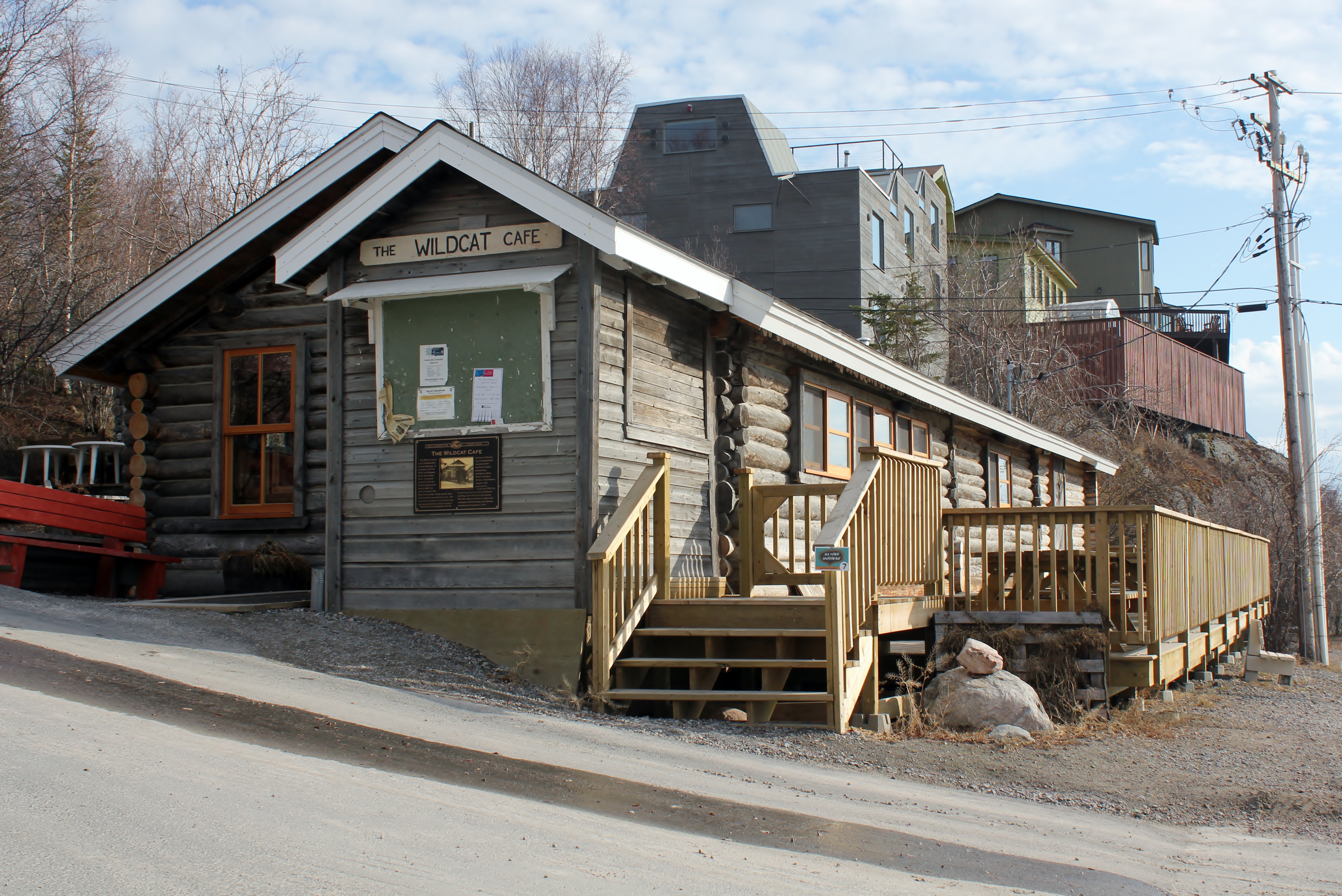
First opened in 1937, Wildcat Cafe is the oldest restaurant in Yellowknife.

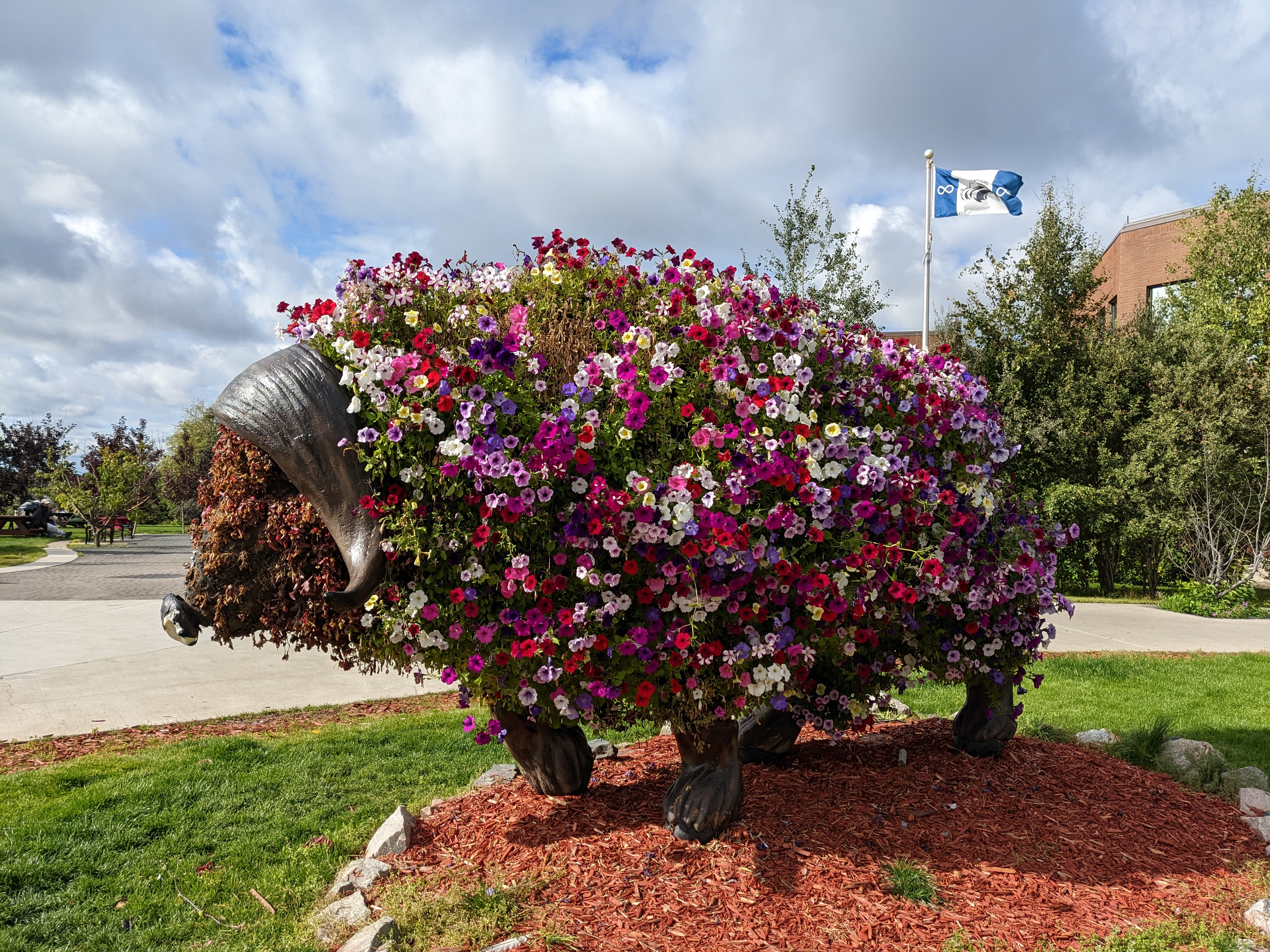
Elon Muskox, a muskox sculpture at the front of Yellowknife City Hall (summer).

Notable places to visit in Yellowknife include:

- The Wildcat Cafe, which opened in 1937. The popular restaurant operates in its original building during the summer, which was moved to its current location after being saved from demolition in the late 1970s. The Wildcat Cafe was renovated from 2011 to 2013. The City hosted a grand opening of the new Wildcat Cafe on 16 June 2013.
- The Gold Range Bar (also known as The Strange Range and listed in the circa 1989 phonebook as such), one of the oldest and most colourful drinking establishments in the Northwest Territories and featured in Elizabeth Hay's novel Late Nights On Air and Mordecai Richler's novel Solomon Gursky Was Here.
- Downtown contains the Capital Area Park, a short but pleasant stroll by City Hall, the Prince of Wales Northern Heritage Centre, the Legislature.
- The Prince of Wales Northern Heritage Centre is a museum containing exhibits of the history and culture of Inuit, Inuvialuit, Dene, Métis and non-aboriginal peoples of the NWT. It is found just north of downtown on an attractive location overlooking Frame Lake.
- Near the Prince of Wales Northern Heritage Centre, the Northwest Territories Legislative Building houses the territory's legislative assembly.
- The Northern Arts and Cultural Centre, in Sir John Franklin High School, is the city's largest indoor stage for theatre and musical presentations.
- Elon the Muskox (Elon Muskox), a mosaiculture horticultural living sculpture of a muskox exhibited in 2018 in front of City Hall.
- Centre Square Mall: Northwest Territories' largest shopping mall and the tallest building in Northern Canada. Centre Square Mall contains many shops, the Yellowknife Public Library, and the Yellowknife Visitor Centre.

Other notable attractions include the Ingraham Trail, local fishing lodges, bush plane tours, the unique architecture of Old Town with the Bush Pilots monument, and any of the numerous lakes surrounding Yellowknife, many of which include beaches.

==== Historical sites ====
- Back Bay Cemetery – pioneer graveyard, 1938
- Bank of Toronto – log cabin bank, 1944
- Canadian Pacific Airlines floatbase – Old Town float plane base, 1946
- Fireweed Studio – Giant Mine log cabin, 1939
- Hudson's Bay Warehouse – Hudson's Bay Company trading post, 1945
- Log School House – Yellowknife's first school, 1939
- Old Fort Providence – first trading post in the region, 1789
- Weaver & Devore Trading – in operation since 1936
- The Wildcat Cafe – longest serving restaurant
- Post Office – community post office since 1956

== Media ==
=== Print ===
The Yellowknifer, published by Northern News Services, is the major newspaper serving Yellowknife, published twice weekly on Wednesday and Friday. Northern News Services also publishes Northwest Territories News/North every Monday, which serves the entire NWT. As well, there is L'Aquilon, a French language newspaper published weekly. Up Here magazine is based in Yellowknife, offering northern-related news and lifestyle articles. Edge Magazine, which began in 2011, was also based in Yellowknife and it covered arts, events, people, culture and economy around the city.

=== Radio ===
Frequency	Call sign	Branding	Format	Owner	Notes
FM 95.3	CBNY-FM	CBC Music	Assorted music, public radio	Canadian Broadcasting Corporation	Rebroadcaster of CBU-FM (Vancouver)
FM 98.9	CFYK-FM	CBC Radio One	Talk radio, public radio	Canadian Broadcasting Corporation	Part of CBC North
FM 100.1	CJCD-FM	100.1 True North FM	Adult contemporary	Vista Broadcast Group	
FM 101.9	CKLB-FM	CKLB Radio: The Voice of Denendeh	Community radio	Native Communications Society of the Northwest Territories	First Nations community radio
FM 103.5	CIVR-FM	Radio Taïga	Community radio	Société Radio Taïga	French language community radio

Cabin Radio, an internet radio service, was launched in 2017. It applied in 2019 for a CRTC license to launch as a community radio station, but its application was denied. A new application was heard by the CRTC in February 2025; on July 30, 2025, the CRTC approved Cabin Radio's application, assigning it the call letters CJFC-FM and the frequency of 93.9 FM.

=== Television ===
OTA channel	Call sign	Network	Notes
8 (VHF)	CFYK-DT	CBC Television	Flagship television station for CBC North
11 (VHF)	CHTY-TV	Aboriginal Peoples Television Network	Flagship television station for the Aboriginal Peoples Television Network
13 (VHF)	CH4127	Ici Radio-Canada Télé	Community-owned rebroadcaster of CBFT-DT (Montreal). Status after 2010 is unknown; Ici Grand Nord and Unis TV were instead known to be broadcast on cable as of December 2023.
17 (UHF)	CHNP-TV	Independent station	Branded on air as “Isuma Local Media”
35 (UHF)	CHUT-TV	Legislative Assembly of Nunavut and the Northwest Territories	Branded on-air as “Legislative Assembly Television”
44 (UHF)	CKLT-TV	Uvagut TV	

No part of the Northwest Territories is designated as a mandatory market for digital television conversion; only CFYK-DT converted its main transmitter in Yellowknife to digital.

On 10 August 2012, NASA announced that the section of Mars where the Curiosity of the Mars Science Laboratory mission landed would be renamed Yellowknife, in recognition of the city. Yellowknife is usually where scientists start geological mapping expeditions when researching the oldest known rocks in North America.

=== Film ===
In 2026, Capitol Theatre was the only movie theatre in operation. In February of that year, its owner announced that the business had been struggling since the COVID-19 pandemic and that they planned to cease operations by the end of March.

== Notable people ==
- Ewan Affleck, Canadian general practitioner and recipient of the Order of Canada.
- Deena Hinshaw, Chief Medical Officer of Alberta
- Margot Kidder, film and television actress best known for playing Lois Lane in the Superman movies of the 1970s and 1980s, was born in Yellowknife
- Kevin Koe, World Champion Curler and skip of the Canadian Men's Curling Team at the 2018 Winter Olympics.
- Shane Koyczan, poet of anti-bullying poem "To This Day" among others
- Tobias Mehler, film and television actor best known for his roles on Battlestar Galactica and Stargate SG-1
- Vic Mercredi, Métis hockey player, first person born in the NWT to be drafted into the National Hockey League
- Dustin Milligan, film and television actor; lead actor in the first season of the Beverly Hills, 90210 spinoff and regular on Schitt's Creek.
- John Sissons, politician and the first judge of the Supreme Court of the Northwest Territories
- Greg Vaydik, National Hockey League player
- Max Ward, pioneering bush pilot and founder of Wardair, later sold to Canadian Airlines

== See also ==
- Arctic Air
- CFNA HQ Yellowknife
- Fred Henne Territorial Park
- History of Northwest Territories capital cities
- List of tallest buildings in Yellowknife
- Yellowknife Water Aerodrome
