= MV Merv Hardie =

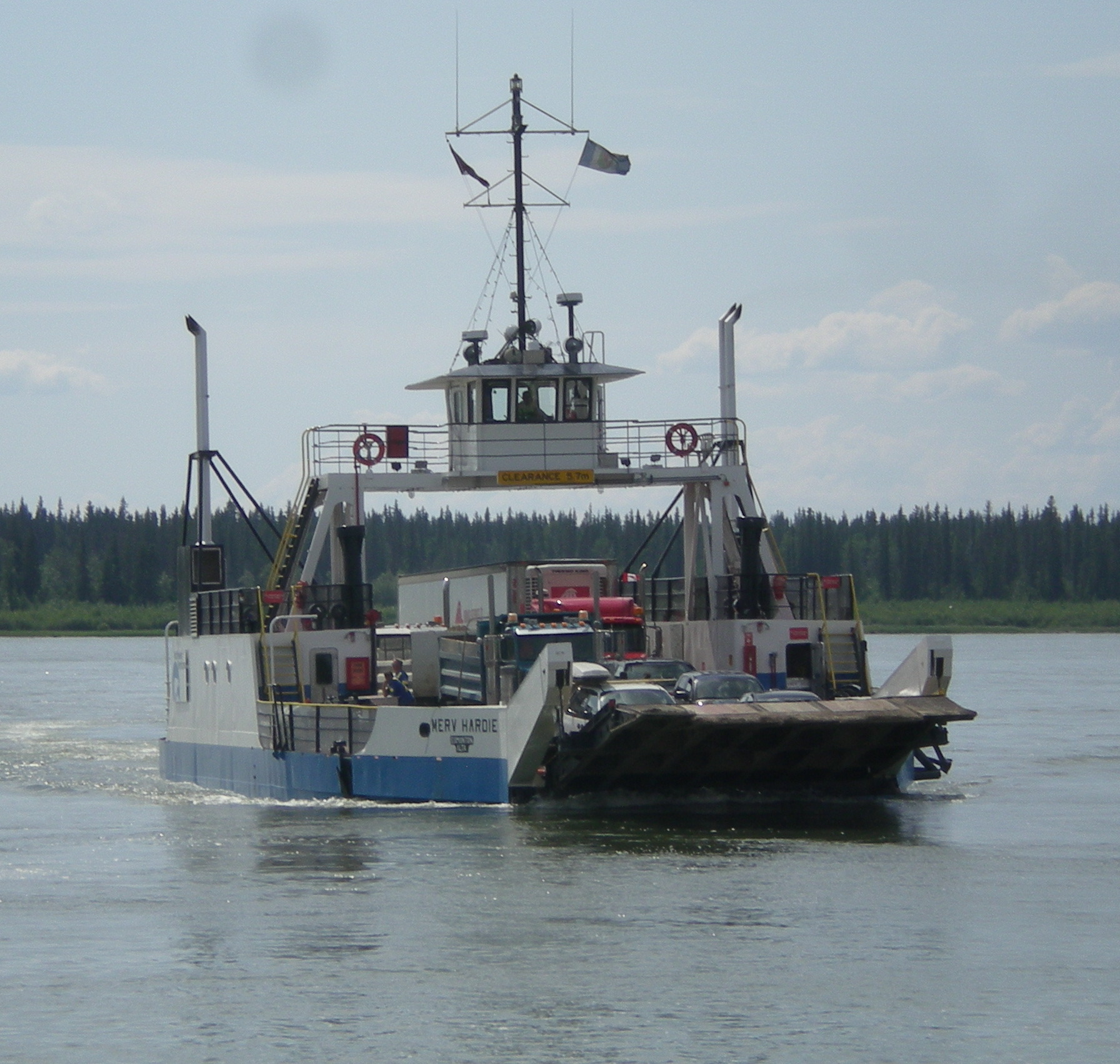
The Merv Hardie in 2011.

The Merv Hardie, named for politician, businessman and bush pilot Merv Hardie, was a ferry that connected the eastern and western portions of the Yellowknife Highway, across the Mackenzie River, near Fort Providence. She was retired in late 2012 when the Deh Cho Bridge, the first road bridge across the Mackenzie, was completed.

The Mackenzie River ices up for months of the year. Depending on conditions the ferry was able to cross, when the ice was relatively thin. Ice dams could lower water levels, making crossings impossible. When the ice grew thick enough, an ice bridge was maintained, capable of allowing the crossing of the largest vehicles.

Following her last crossing at Fort Providence the Northern Journal interviewed John Mikula, who had served as one of the ferry's captains. Mikula, who had served as a captain for 17 years, told the Northern Journal that when crew member's previous contracts had come up for renewal they had only been offered contracts that classified them as casual workers, with the result that when the service ended they were not entitled to severance pay, and this had left the workers feeling bitter.

In February 2013, several months after she was retired from the Fort Providence crossing, Sonny Blake Jr., member for the Mackenzie Delta riding in the territorial legislature, asked the Minister of Transportation Dave Ramsay, whether the ferry could replace the MV Louis Cardinal, a smaller and less capable ferry operating at Tsiigehtchic, in the delta. Ramsay said the ferry needed maintenance work, but the government would consider putting her in service elsewhere. However, as of 2020 the Merv Hardie had not been returned to service.
