= Glenna Hansen =

Canadian politician

Glenna F. Hansen

Commissioner of the Northwest Territories
- In office March 31, 2000 – April 29, 2005
- Prime Minister: Jean Chrétien; Paul Martin
- Premier: Stephen Kakfwi; Joe Handley
- Preceded by: Daniel Joseph Marion
- Succeeded by: Tony Whitford

Personal details
- Born: August 10, 1956 (age 69) Aklavik, Northwest Territories, Canada
- Party: Independent

Glenna Hansen
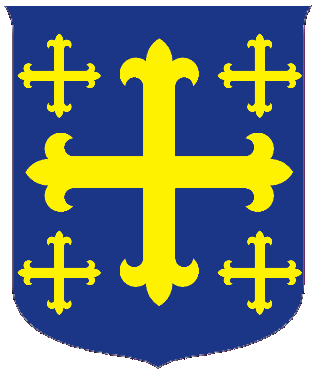
- Crest: A Viking longship affronty its sail Or charged with an ulu Azure.
- Shield: Azure a cross flory between four like crosslets Or.
- Supporters: Two lions Or each gorged with a collar of roses Gules, standing on a mound of snow Argent charged in base with a bar wavy Azure.
- Motto: Never Say Die

Glenna F. Hansen (born August 10, 1956) is an Inuvialuk Canadian politician. She served as the commissioner of the Northwest Territories from March 31, 2000, to April 29, 2005.

== Early life ==
Born in Aklavik, Northwest Territories, Canada, Hansen joined David Storr and Sons Contracting Ltd., in 1991 as an executive assistant. As of 2004, she is general manager of David Storr and Sons Contracting Ltd., a position she rose to in 1996.

== Election attempts ==
Hansen ran for a seat in the Northwest Territories Legislature in the electoral district of Inuvik Twin Lakes for the 1999 Northwest Territories general election but lost to Roger Allen. She ascended to political office after being appointed Commissioner a few months later.

Hansen appeared on the political scene again running for a seat in the 2011 Northwest Territories election in the electoral district of Mackenzie Delta. The race was hotly contested due incumbent David Krutko not standing for re-election. She was defeated finishing in fifth place in the five-way race losing to Frederick Blake Jr.

== Commissioner ==
On March 31, 2000, Hansen was appointed and sworn in as the 14th Commissioner of the Northwest Territories and the 24th head of state for the territory since 1870. She served in the role until April 29, 2005.
