= 2019 Northwest Territories municipal elections =

Local elections in Canada

- December 9, 2019

Local elections were held in seven hamlets and two charter communities in the Northwest Territories in 2019. Hamlet elections took place on December 19, while the charter communities of Tsiigehtchic and K’asho Got’ine held elections on June 17 and July 19, respectively. One additional hamlet, Tuktoyaktuk, cancelled its elections when the candidates for mayor and community council went uncontested.

== Aklavik ==
Turnout reached 62% with 245 out 398 registered voters casting their ballots.

=== Mayoral election ===
Candidate	Vote	
Candidate	#	%
Andrew Charlie (inc.)	137	55.92
Robert Buckle	108	44.08
Total	245	100%

=== Council election ===
Candidate	Vote
Dave McLeod	164
Don D. Storr	131
Edwin Greenland	126
William Storr	125
Velma Illasiak	103
Neil Heron	94
Kathy Greenland	93
Charles Furlong	53
Total	889

== Enterprise ==
Turnout reached 70% with 50 out 71 registered voters casting their ballots.

=== Mayoral election ===
Candidate	Vote	
Candidate	#	%
Brandon Kimble	22	44.90
Leonard LaLonde	21	42.86
Michael St. Amour	6	12.24
Total	49	100%

=== Council election ===
Candidate	Vote
Sandra McMaster	29
Michael St. Amour	27
Leonard LaLonde	26
Bruce Kendol Proud	25
Chaal Richard Cadieux	17
Winnie Cadieux	17
Total	141

== K'asho Got'ine (Fort Good Hope) ==
Turnout reached 40% with 285 out 705 registered voters casting their ballots.

=== Chief election ===
Candidate	Vote	
Candidate	#	%
Daniel Masuzumi	166	65.35
Wilfred McNeely Jr.	88	34.65
Total	254	100%

=== Council election ===
Candidate	Vote
Joseph Tobac	176
Arthur Tobac	159
Stella Tabesca	139
Jacinta Grandjambe	130
George Barnaby	127
Charles McNeely	125
Rose McNeely	125
Roger Boniface	118
Dwayne Barnaby	116
Paul Dixon	108
Tommy Kakfwi	95
Collin Pierrot	92
Lucy Jackson	84
Alexis Orlias	72
Barthelemy Kotchile	40
Total	1,706

== Fort Liard ==
Turnout reached 38% with 120 out 320 registered voters casting their ballots.

=== Mayoral election ===
Candidate	Vote	
Candidate	#	%
Hillary Deneron	71	51.08
Mike Gonet	68	48.92
Total	139	100%

=== Council election ===
Candidate	Vote
Julia Capot Blanc	122
Collin Woehl	116
Kathie Hardisty	99
Cathy Marie Kotchea	94
Eva Hope	93
Herbert Berreault	91
Mike Gonet	76
Vanessa Villeneuve	61
Total	752

== Fort McPherson ==
Turnout reached 21% with 109 out 530 registered voters casting their ballots.

=== Council election ===
Candidate	Vote
Marion Koe	87
Ruby McDonald	83
Delores Vittrekwa	73
Dennis Wright	63
Lawrence Firth	47
Total	353

=== Referendum ===
Fort McPherson is seeking voter approval for a $1.5 million loan to upgrade the community arena.
Choice	Vote	
Choice	#	%
Yes	89	87.25
No	13	12.75
Total	102	100%

== Fort Resolution ==
Turnout reached 68% with 232 out 342 registered voters casting their ballots.

=== Mayoral election ===
Candidate	Vote	
Candidate	#	%
Patrick Simon	128	55.41
Louis Balsillie (inc.)	103	44.59
Total	231	100%

=== Council election ===
Candidate	Vote
Tammy Hunter-McKay	133
Frank Fabien	111
Erica Lafferty	98
Wilfred Simon	95
Kevin Boucher	70
Total	507

== Sachs Harbour ==
Turnout reached 57% with 39 out 69 registered voters casting their ballots.

=== Mayoral election ===
Candidate	Vote	
Candidate	#	%
Norman Anikina (inc.) (1-year term)	25	67.57
Kyle Wolki	12	32.43
Total	37	100%

=== Council election ===
Candidate	Vote
Sharan Green (2-year term)	30
Donna Keogak (2-year term)	27
Angella Keogak (2-year term)	25
Wayne Gully (1-year term)	24
Shelby Lucas (1-year term)	16
Kyle Wolki	12
Total	134

== Tsiigehtchic ==
Turnout reached 39% with 37 out 95 registered voters casting their ballots.

=== Council election ===
Candidate	Vote
Jamie Benoit-Cardinal	23
Bob Mumford	19
John Norbert	17
James Andre	7
Total	66

== Tuktoyaktuk ==
=== Mayoral election ===
Candidate	Vote	
Candidate	#	%
Erwin Elias (inc.)	Acclaimed	
Total	N/A	

=== Council election ===
Candidate	Vote
Jeannie Gruben	Acclaimed
Georgina Jacobson-Masuzumi	Acclaimed
Joe Nasogaluak	Acclaimed
James Pokiak	Acclaimed
Dennis Raddi Sr.	Acclaimed
Total	N/A

== Ulukhaktok ==
Turnout reached 38% with 107 out 278 registered voters casting their ballots.

=== Council election ===
Candidate	Vote
Sarah Kuptana (2-year term)	66
Kimberly Joss (2-year term)	62
Denise Okheena (2-year term)	61
Mary K. Okheena (2-year term)	53
Delma Klengenberg (1-year term)	51
Connie Alanak	44
Mollie Oliktoak	39
Jean Ekpakohak	37
Helena Ekootak	29
Joe Nilgak	20
Celine Inuktalik	19
Jack Akhiatak	17
Total	498
