= Frederick Blake Jr. =

Canadian First Nations politician

Frederick Blake Jr. Grand Chief
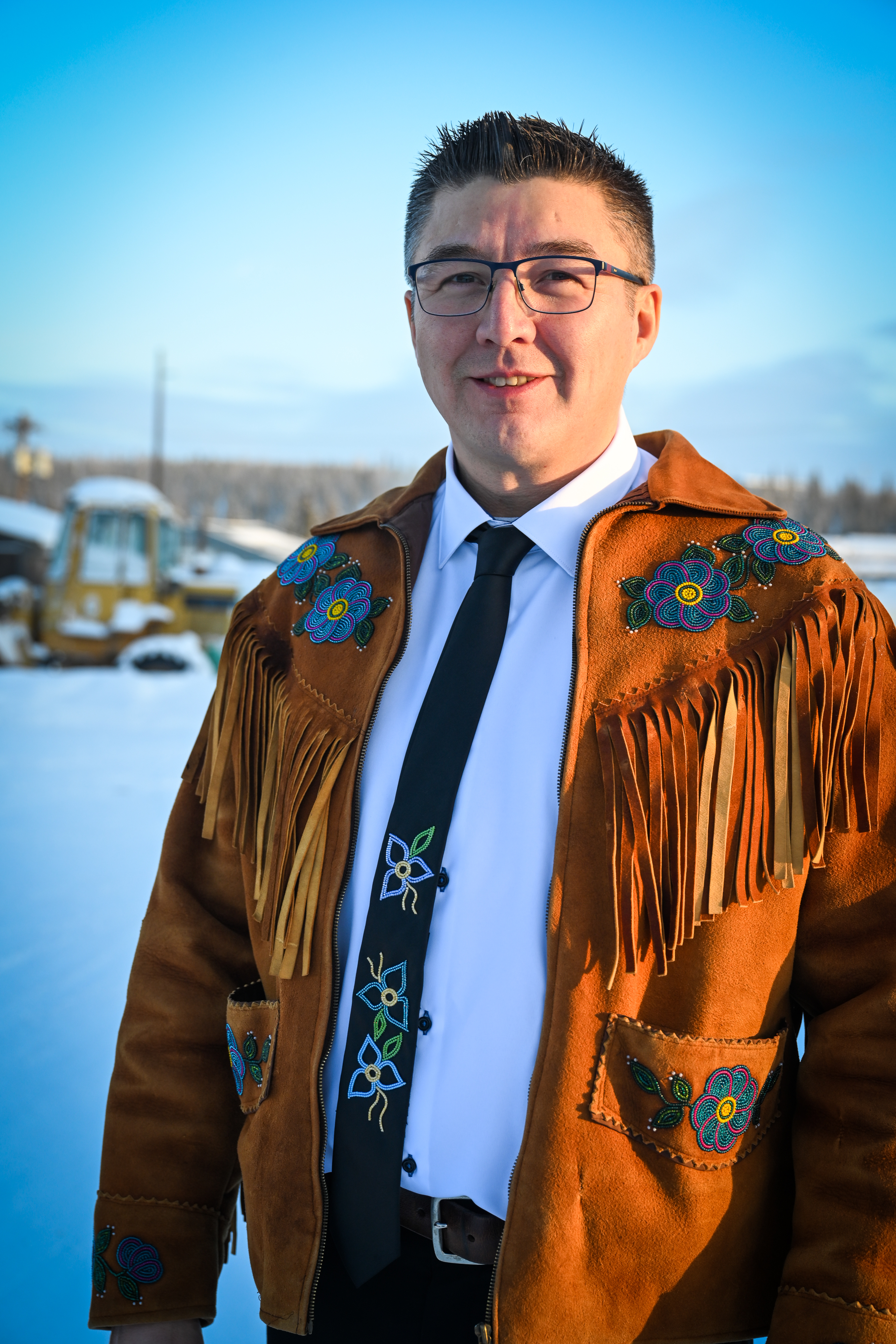

Grand Chief of the Gwich'in Tribal Council
- In office January 31, 2025 – January 31, 2029
- Preceded by: Ken Kyikavichik

Member of the Legislative Assembly of the Northwest Territories for Mackenzie Delta
- In office October 3, 2011 – October 3, 2023
- Succeeded by: George Nerysoo

15th Speaker of the Legislative Assembly of the Northwest Territories
- In office October 24, 2019 – November 14, 2023
- Preceded by: Jackson Lafferty
- Succeeded by: Shane Thompson

Personal details
- Born: 1977 (age 48–49) Inuvik

Frederick Blake Jr. is a First Nations Canadian politician, who was first elected to the Legislative Assembly of the Northwest Territories in the 2011 election. Frederick “Sonny” Blake Jr. served as Chief of the Arctic Red River Band (the Gwichya Gwich’in community in Tsiigehtchic) from 2009 until 2011. That four-year term preceded his election to the Legislative Assembly in October 2011. He was the MLA for Mackenzie Delta from 2011 - 2023. In 2024, he was elected as Grand Chief of the Gwich'in Tribal Council. He was sworn in Ceremonially on January 31, 2025. His term will last four years from 2025 - 2029.

== Biography ==
Grand Chief Blake lives in Tsiigehtchic, Northwest Territories with his family. His parents, Grace and Frederick Blake, also live in Tsiigehtchic.

== Arctic Red River ==
Blake was Chief for the Arctic Red River Band from 2007 - 2011.

== Political career ==
Before entering territorial politics, Blake served as Chief of the Arctic Red River Band, representing the Gwichya Gwich’in people of Tsiigehtchic from 2007 to 2011. During his tenure, he focused on improving housing and community infrastructure, advancing youth programming, and strengthening local governance rooted in Gwich’in values. Blake’s leadership was marked by a commitment to traditional land use, intergenerational knowledge sharing, and collaborative decision-making with Elders and council members. His work as Chief helped lay the foundation for his later role in territorial government, where he continued to advocate for Indigenous self-determination and community-based leadership.

Blake ran for public office in the 2011 Northwest Territories general election as a candidate in the Mackenzie Delta electoral district. The election was hotly contested due to the opening created by incumbent speaker David Krutko stepping down. Blake defeated four other candidates, including former Northwest Territories Commissioner Glenna Hansen, to win his first term in office.

In February 2013, Blake asked the Minister of Transportation Dave Ramsay, whether the ferry M.V. Merv Hardie, recently retired from the crossing at Fort Providence after the completion of the Deh Cho Bridge, could replace the MV Louis Cardinal, a smaller and less capable ferry operating at Tsiigehtchic.

During his time in the Legislative Assembly of the Northwest Territories, Blake was appointed Deputy Speaker following his re-election in 2015, where he played a key role in maintaining decorum and supporting legislative procedure. In 2019, he was selected by his peers to serve as the 15th Speaker of the Legislative Assembly, becoming one of the few Gwich’in leaders to hold the position. As Speaker, he presided over debates, upheld parliamentary rules, and ensured respectful dialogue among members during a time of increasing political complexity in the North.

On August 19, 2024, Blake was elected Grand Chief of the Gwich’in Tribal Council, receiving 604 votes to his opponent’s 515 in a closely contested race. His campaign emphasized unity, transparent governance, and the defense of Gwich’in rights and lands. A point of contrast in the campaign was that his opponent resided outside the Gwich’in Settlement Area, while Blake remained deeply rooted in his home community of Tsiigehtchic. Following the election, two Gwich’in councils launched a legal challenge questioning the electoral process; however, the Northwest Territories Supreme Court ultimately upheld the validity of the vote. Blake officially assumed office on January 14, 2025, and was ceremonially sworn in in Tsiigehtchic on January 31, 2025. His election marked a return to Indigenous governance after more than a decade in territorial politics and reaffirmed his long-standing commitment to serving Gwich’in Participants across the Gwich'in Settlement Area.

=== Election results ===
2023 Northwest Territories general election: Mackenzie Delta
Candidate	Votes	%
George Nerysoo	233	37.04
Frederick Blake Jr. (I.S.)	220	34.98
Richard Ross Jr.	176	27.98
Total votes	629	

2019 Northwest Territories general election: Mackenzie Delta
Candidate	Votes
Frederick Blake, Jr.	Acclaimed
Source(s) "Eight ridings to watch in the Northwest Territories' election". CBC.

2015 Northwest Territories general election: Mackenzie Delta
Candidate	Votes	%
Frederick Blake, Jr.	313	48.0
William Firth	137	21.0
Norman Snowshoe	116	17.8
David Krutko	86	13.2

2011 Northwest Territories general election: Mackenzie Delta
Candidate	Votes
Frederick Blake, Jr.	190
Taig Connell	150
Eugene Pascal	132
Mary Clark	89
Glenna Hansen	66
