= Mackenzie Delta =

Mackenzie Delta may refer to:

- The delta of the Mackenzie River, where it empties into the Arctic Ocean, in the Northwest Territories, Canada
- Mackenzie Delta (electoral district), a territorial electoral district for the Legislative Assembly of Northwest Territories, Canada
