= Robert C. McLeod (Northwest Territories politician) =

Canadian politician

The Honourable Robert C. McLeod

Member of the Legislative Assembly of the Northwest Territories for Inuvik Twin Lakes
- In office November 29, 2004 – September 2, 2019
- Preceded by: Roger Allen
- Succeeded by: Lesa Semmler

Personal details
- Born: March 3, 1960 (age 66) Aklavik, Northwest Territories
- Party: Independent

Robert C. McLeod (born March 3, 1960, in Aklavik, Northwest Territories, Canada) is a former Canadian politician who represented the electoral district of Inuvik Twin Lakes in the Legislative Assembly of the Northwest Territories from 2004 to 2019.

Prior to his election to the legislature, he worked as a carpenter and private contractor.

McLeod was first elected in a by-election held on November 29, 2004. He served until the 2019 Northwest Territories general election, when he retired from politics.
