= George Nerysoo =

Canadian politician

George Nerysoo MLA

Member of the Legislative Assembly of the Northwest Territories
- Incumbent
- Assumed office November 14, 2023
- Preceded by: Frederick Blake Jr.
- Constituency: Mackenzie Delta

Personal details
- Party: non-partisan consensus government

George Nerysoo is a Canadian politician, elected to the Legislative Assembly of the Northwest Territories in the 2023 election. He represents the electoral district of Mackenzie Delta. George was charged with Impaired Operation of a Conveyance on March 16th 2025 in the community of Fort McPherson, NWT, the matter is still pending in court.

== Election results ==
2023 Northwest Territories general election: Mackenzie Delta
Candidate	Votes	%
George Nerysoo	233	37.04
Frederick Blake Jr. (I.S.)	220	34.98
Richard Ross Jr.	176	27.98
Total votes	629	
