= Roger Allen (cross-country skier) =

Canadian cross-country skier (born 1952)

Roger T. Allen (born 5 May 1952 ) in Aklavik, Northwest Territories, from Gwich'in First Nations, is a Canadian former cross-country skier who competed in the 1972 Winter Olympics and a former territorial-level politician from Northwest Territories, Canada.

== Cross-country skiing ==
Allen was one of six of eight cross-country skiers sent to the 1972 Olympics who came from the Mackenzie Delta town of Inuvik, Northwest Territories. Allen finished 50th in the 15 km men's and 13th in the relay 4x10 men's races. Roger was part of the Territorial Experimental Ski Training Program at Grollier Hall (Residential School). Growing up, Allen was exposed to multiple sports in the parochial school system in Inuvik which helped him balance education, sport, and spirituality. After retiring from his Olympic career, Allen is now an MLA for the Territorial government, and a cabinet minister.

== Politics ==
After retiring from his Olympic career, Allen became a MLA for the Territorial government, and a cabinet minister.

Allen was first elected to the Northwest Territories Legislature in the 1999 Northwest Territories general election. He defeated future Commissioner Glenna Hansen to win the new Inuvik Twin Lakes electoral district. Allen was re-elected in the 2003 Northwest Territories general election defeating three other candidates with 55% of the vote.

Allen became mired in a scandal after he was found to be living in a residence outside of the Northwest Territories in Grimshaw, Alberta. He swore an affidavit that he lived in a residence just outside Inuvik, Northwest Territories to gain access to the Capital Housing Allowance granting him $25,000 a year for residence in Yellowknife. Allen was forced to appear before a board of inquiry and forced to return $10,000 retroactive to April 1, 2004.

He resigned his seat on October 12, 2004, citing family and personal issues as the reason for stepping down.

Legislative Assembly of the Northwest Territories
Preceded by New District	MLA Inuvik Twin Lakes; 1999-2004	Succeeded by Robert C. McLeod
