= List of municipalities in the Northwest Territories =

Location of the Northwest Territories in Canada

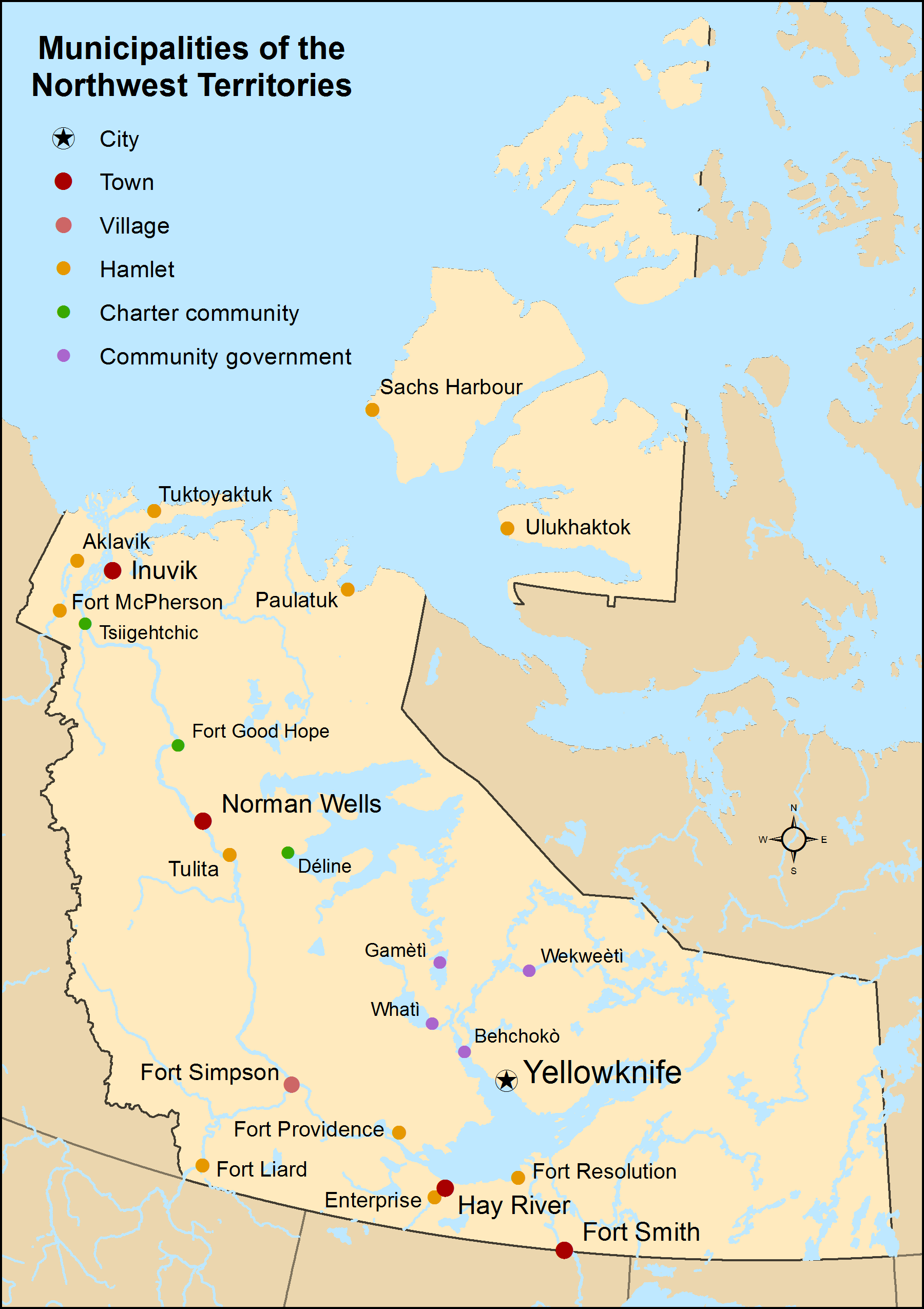
Distribution of the Northwest Territories' 24 municipalities by type

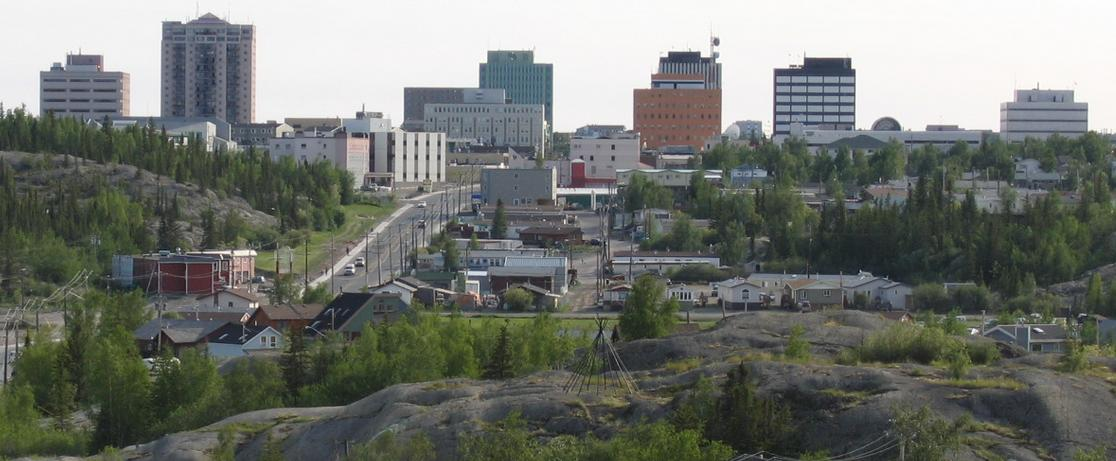
Skyline of downtown Yellowknife

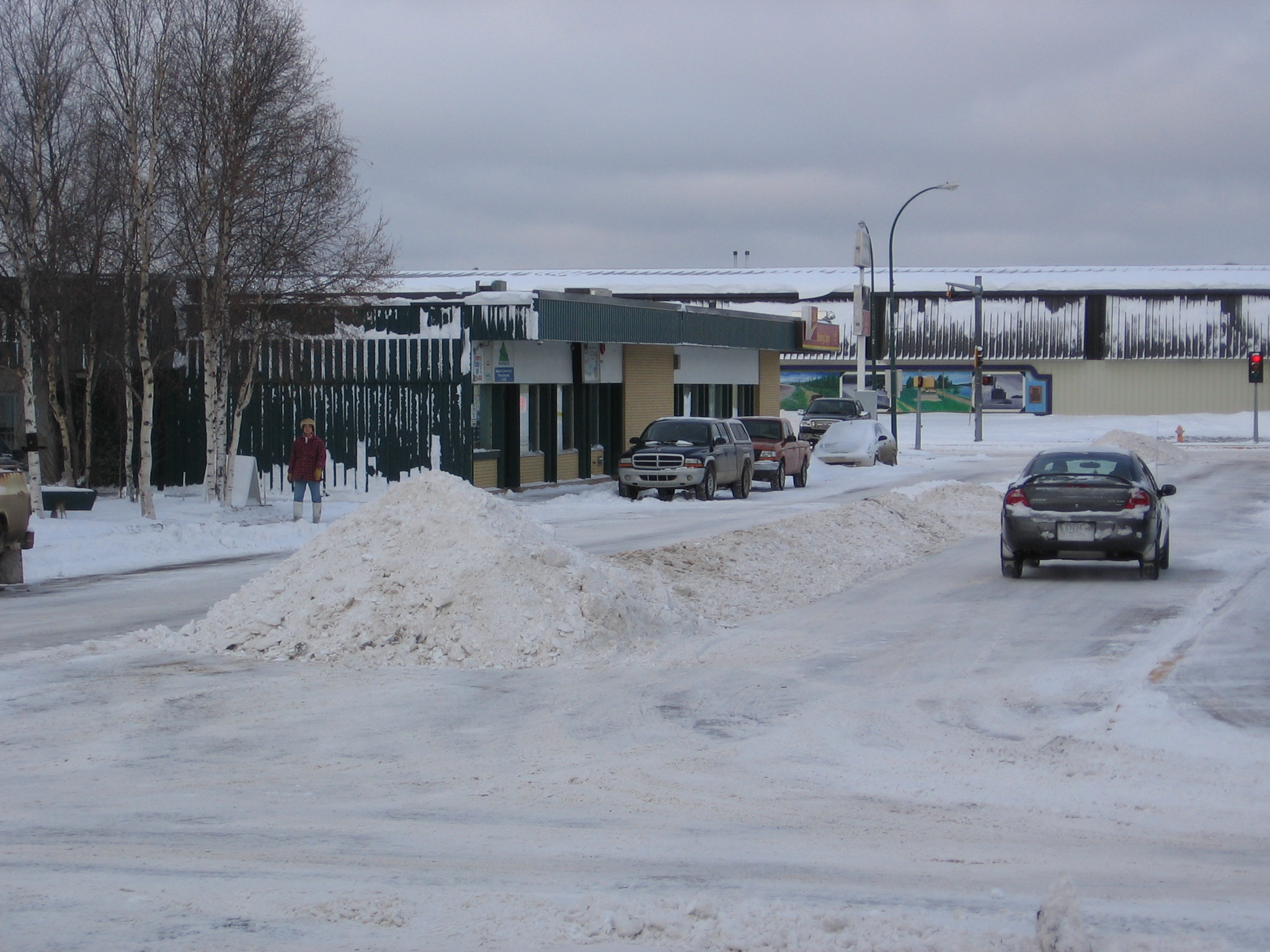
Hay River, the territory's largest town and second-largest community

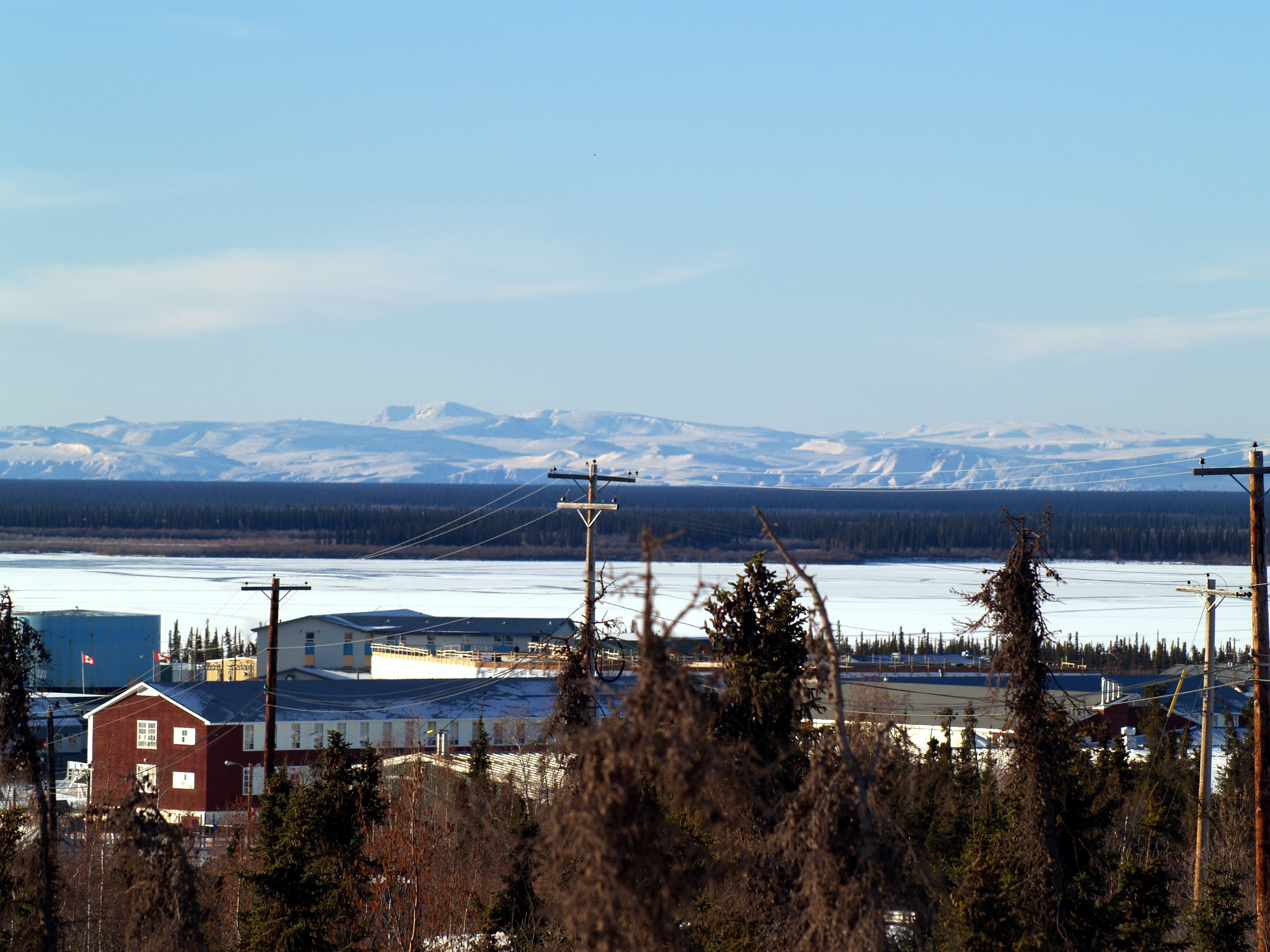
Inuvik, the third-largest municipality in the Northwest Territories

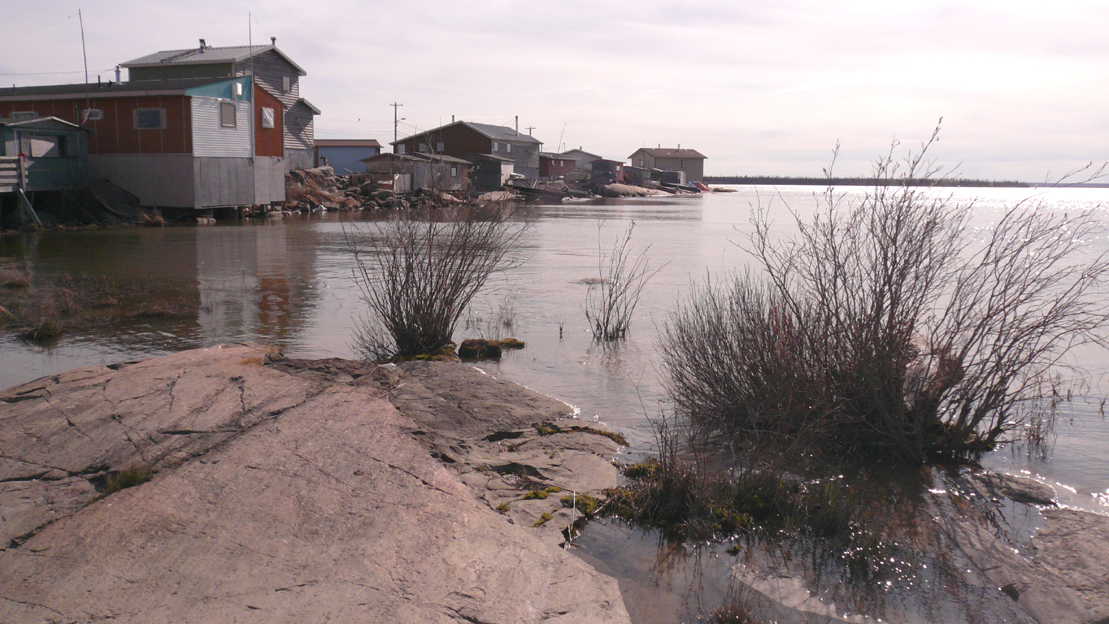
Behchokǫ̀, the territory's largest Tlicho community

The Northwest Territories is the most populous of Canada's three territories with 41,070 residents as of 2021 and is the second-largest territory in land area at 1,127,712 km^{2} (435,412 sq mi). The Northwest Territories' 24 municipalities cover only 0.2% of the territory's land mass but are home to 96% of its population.

According to the Cities, Towns and Villages Act (CTVA), the Hamlets Act and the Charter Communities Act (CCA), all of which were enacted in 2003, a municipality is an area within a city, town, village, hamlet or charter community that was established or continued by a legislative order. The Tlicho Community Government Act (TCGA), enacted in 2004, also considers community governments as municipal corporations alongside charter communities, cities, hamlets, towns and villages.

Yellowknife is the capital of the Northwest Territories and its only city, while Fort Simpson is its only village. Of the remaining 22 municipalities, three of them are charter communities, four are community governments of the Tlicho people, eleven are hamlets and four are towns. The CTVA, the Hamlets Act, the CCA and the TCGA stipulate governance of these municipalities.

Half of the population of the Northwest Territories (49.5%) resides in Yellowknife, the largest municipality in the territory at 20,340 residents. The least populous municipality is Enterprise with 75 residents. The largest municipality by area is Fort Resolution at 452.87 km^{2} (174.85 sq mi), while the smallest is Gamèti at 9.04 km^{2} (3.49 sq mi).

== Cities ==
An application can be submitted to incorporate a community as a city under the Cities, Town and Villages Act at the request of a minimum 25 residents that are eligible electors, or at the initiative of the Minister of Municipal and Community Affairs, if the proposed city has a minimum assessed land value of $200 million or if an exception is made by the Minister. The only city in the Northwest Territories is Yellowknife. It had a population of 20,340 residents and a land area of 103.37 km^{2} (39.91 sq mi) in the 2021 Census.

== Towns ==
Like cities, an application to incorporate as a town can be submitted under the Cities, Town and Villages Act at the request of a minimum 25 residents that are eligible electors, or at the initiative of the Minister of Municipal and Community Affairs. In the case of a town however, the proposed town's minimum assessed land value must be $50 million unless an exception is made by the Minister. The Northwest Territories has four communities incorporated as towns. Hay River is the territory's largest town by population and land area with 3,169 residents and 122.4 km^{2} (47.3 sq mi) respectively. Norman Wells is the smallest town by population at 673 residents while Inuvik is the smallest by land area at 62.68 km^{2} (24.20 sq mi).

== Villages ==
The Cities, Town and Villages Act enables an application to incorporate as a village at the request of a minimum 25 residents that are eligible electors, or at the initiative of the Minister of Municipal and Community Affairs. The proposed village's minimum assessed land value must be $10 million unless an exception is made by the Minister. The only village in the Northwest Territories is Fort Simpson. It had a population of 1,100 residents and a land area of 77.89 km^{2} (30.07 sq mi).

== Hamlets ==
At the request of a minimum 25 residents that are eligible electors, or at the initiative of the Minister of Municipal and Community Affairs, an application can be submitted to incorporate a community as a hamlet under the Hamlets Act. Unlike cities, towns and villages, the incorporation of hamlets are not conditioned by a prescribed minimum assessed land value. Of the 12 hamlets in the Northwest Territories, Tuktoyaktuk is the largest by population with 937 residents and Fort Resolution is the largest by land area at 452.87 km^{2} (174.85 sq mi). Enterprise is the smallest hamlet by population at 75 residents while the smallest by land area is Aklavik at 12.29 km^{2} (4.75 sq mi).

== Charter communities ==
An application to incorporate as a community charter can be submitted under the Charter Communities Act at the request of a minimum 25 residents that are eligible electors, or at the initiative of the Minister of Municipal and Community Affairs. After consultation with community residents and groups, the application can be approved if 60% of the eligible electors vote to approve the incorporation. The Northwest Territories has two charter communities, Délı̨nę and Fort Good Hope. Of the two, Délı̨nę is larger by population with 573 residents and larger by land area at 79.39 km^{2} (30.65 sq mi). Fort Good Hope is smaller with 503 residents and 47.25 km^{2} (18.24 sq mi) of land area.

== Tlicho community governments ==
Four community governments were established through the enactment of the Tlicho Community Government Act. Behchokǫ̀ is the territory's largest community government by population and land area at 1,746 residents and 74.96 km^{2} (28.94 sq mi) respectively. Wekweeti is the smallest community government by population at 109 residents while Gamèti is the smallest by land area at 9.04 km^{2} (3.49 sq mi). The fourth community is Whatì, the second largest by area (58.33 km^{2} [22.52 sq mi]) and population (543).

== List of municipalities ==
List of municipalities in the Northwest Territories
Name	Status	Incorporation date	2021 Census of Population				
Name	Status	Incorporation date	Population (2021)	Population (2016)	Change	Land area (km^{2})	Population density (/km^{2})
Aklavik	Hamlet	January 1, 1974	536	590	−9.2%	12.29	43.6
Behchokǫ̀	Community government (Tlicho)	August 4, 2005	1,746	1,874	−6.8%	74.96	23.3
Délı̨nę	Charter community	April 1, 1993	573	533	+7.5%	79.39	7.2
Enterprise	Hamlet	October 29, 2007	75	106	−29.2%	305.58	0.2
Fort Good Hope	Charter community	April 1, 1995	507	516	−1.7%	47.25	10.7
Fort Liard	Hamlet	April 1, 1987	468	500	−6.4%	67.61	6.9
Fort McPherson	Hamlet	November 1, 1986	647	700	−7.6%	53.83	12.0
Fort Providence	Hamlet	January 1, 1987	618	695	−11.1%	255.49	2.4
Fort Resolution	Hamlet	January 5, 2011	412	470	−12.3%	452.87	0.9
Fort Simpson	Village	January 1, 1973	1,100	1,202	−8.5%	77.89	14.1
Fort Smith	Town	October 1, 1966	2,248	2,542	−11.6%	91.21	24.6
Gamèti	Community government (Tlicho)	August 4, 2005	252	278	−9.4%	9.04	27.9
Hay River	Town	June 27, 1963	3,169	3,528	−10.2%	122.40	25.9
Inuvik	Town	January 1, 1979	3,137	3,243	−3.3%	62.68	50.0
Norman Wells	Town	April 12, 1992	673	778	−13.5%	82.09	8.2
Paulatuk	Hamlet	April 1, 1987	298	265	+12.5%	63.58	4.7
Sachs Harbour	Hamlet	April 1, 1986	104	103	+1.0%	272.22	0.4
Tsiigehtchic	Hamlet	July 1, 2024 (Note: Tsiigehtchic incorporated as a charter community under the name Arctic Red River in 1993 prior to incorporating as a hamlet in 2024.)	138	172	−19.8%	47.89	2.9
Tuktoyaktuk	Hamlet	April 1, 1970	937	898	+4.3%	12.66	74.0
Tulita	Hamlet	April 1, 1984	396	477	−17.0%	52.28	7.6
Ulukhaktok	Hamlet	April 1, 1984	408	396	+3.0%	120.71	3.4
Wekweètì	Community government (Tlicho)	August 4, 2005	109	129	−15.5%	14.71	7.4
Whatì	Community government (Tlicho)	August 4, 2005	543	470	+15.5%	58.33	9.3
Yellowknife	City	January 1, 1970 (Note: Yellowknife incorporated as a municipal district in 1953 prior to incorporating as a city in 1970.)	20,340	19,569	+3.9%	103.37	196.8
Total municipalities			39,434	40,034	−1.5%	2,540.33	15.5
Northwest Territories			41,070	41,786	−1.7%	1,127,711.92	0.0

== See also ==
- List of communities in the Northwest Territories
- List of population centres in the Northwest Territories
