= David Krutko =

Canadian politician

Member of the Legislative Assembly of the Northwest Territories for Mackenzie Delta
- In office October 16, 1995 – October 3, 2011
- Preceded by: Richard Nerysoo
- Succeeded by: Frederick Blake, Jr.

11th Speaker of the Legislative Assembly of Northwest Territories
- In office December 11, 2003 – June 1, 2004
- Preceded by: Tony Whitford
- Succeeded by: Paul Delorey

Personal details
- Born: November 11, 1957 (age 68) Aklavik, Northwest Territories, Canada

David Krutko (born November 11, 1957) is a retired territorial level politician in Northern Canada and a former speaker of the Northwest Territories legislature.

Krutko was first elected to the Northwest Territories legislature in the 1995 general election. He defeated former Premier Richard Nerysoo in an upset victory. He was re-elected in the 1999 general election, winning in a landslide with 75% of the vote. He was subsequently re-elected by acclamation in the 2003 general election.

After being re-elected to his third term in office he was elected speaker on December 11, 2003 after Tony Whitford was appointed commissioner. He resigned as Speaker on June 1, 2004 when he was appointed to the cabinet replacing Henry Zoe who had been voted out by the legislature in a vote of no confidence. He was appointed as the Minister Responsible for the Northwest Territories Power Corporation and the Minister of Public Works and Services as well as the Minister Responsible for the Workers' Compensation Board.

Krutko was re-elected to a fourth term in the 2007 general election with 50.5% of the vote. He retired at the 2011 general election but returned to fight the Mackenzie Delta seat again in 2015. On this occasion he came fourth with 86 votes, or less than 14%.
