= Deh Cho Bridge =

Bridge across the Mackenzie River in Northwest Territories, Canada

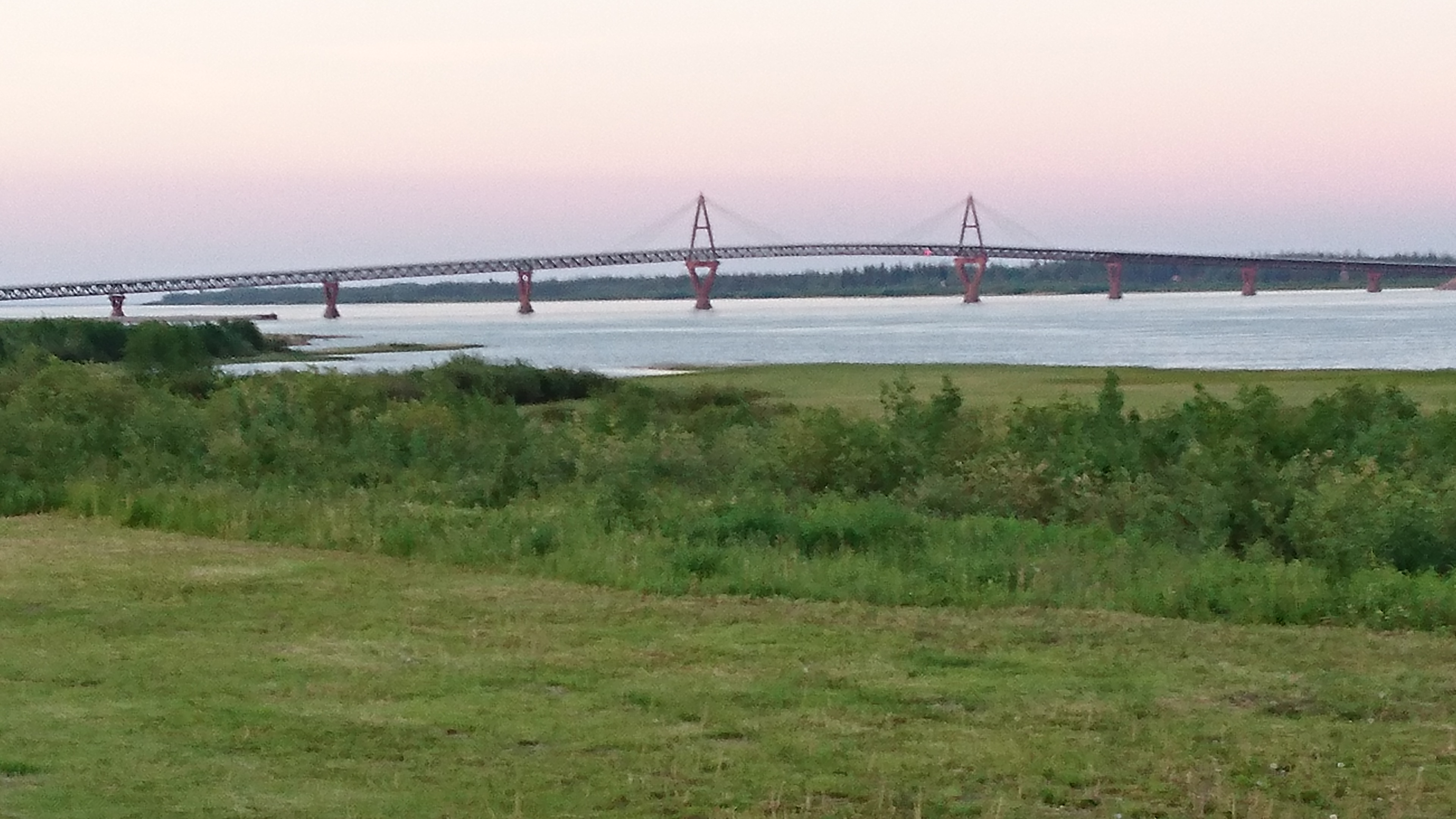
- Deh Cho Bridge in 2016
- Coordinates: 61°15′45″N 117°31′30″W
- Carries: 2 lanes of Highway 3
- Crosses: Mackenzie River
- Locale: Fort Providence
- Official name: Deh Cho Bridge
- Owner: Government of the Northwest Territories

Characteristics
- Design: Truss bridge Cable-stayed main span
- Total length: 1.1 km (0.68 mi)
- Longest span: 190 m (623 ft)
- No. of spans: 9
- Piers in water: 8
- Design life: 75 years

History
- Construction start: June 2008
- Construction cost: Can$202 million
- Opened: November 30, 2012

Location
- Location in the Northwest Territories Deh Cho Bridge (Canada) Interactive map of Deh Cho Bridge

The Deh Cho Bridge is a 1.1 km-long (0.68 mi) cable-stayed bridge across a 1.6 km (0.99 mi) span of the Mackenzie River on the Yellowknife Highway (Highway 3) near Fort Providence, Northwest Territories. Construction began in 2008 and was expected to be completed in 2010 but faced delays due to technical and financial difficulties. The bridge officially opened to traffic on November 30, 2012. The bridge replaced the MV Merv Hardie, the ferry in operation at the time of opening, and ice bridge combination used for river crossing.

Deh Cho (lit. "Big River") is the Slavey language name for the Mackenzie River.

== History ==
NWT Highway 3 (or the Yellowknife Highway) must cross over a kilometre of open water or ice on the Mackenzie River south of Fort Providence. Since the highway opened in 1960 through November 2012, a seasonal ferry service was provided (roughly mid-May until December or January), with an ice road maintained across the frozen river from December to April. During the spring breakup season, due to hazards from floating or jammed ice there was a 3-4 week period (from mid-April to mid-May) between the closing of the ice road and the start of ferry service. No vehicles could cross during this period, and supplies for Yellowknife and other highway communities north of the river had to be relayed across by helicopter, sent by air freight, or wait until ferry operations begin. A similar but shorter freeze-up period used to occur in December/January between the end of ferry operations and the opening of the ice road, but since the early 1980s ferry operations had generally been able to extend until the ice road was open.

The closing of the crossing created added transportation inconveniences and costs for residents north of the river, especially for perishable items such as food. A bridge had been of interest since the highway was opened, but various proposals for a bridge had difficulty establishing financial feasibility given the limited traffic volumes and the estimated construction and maintenance costs involved.

On August 9, 2023, one of the suspension cables on the southeast side of the bridge let go due to a metallurgical defect. This led to the bridge being reduced to one lane, as well as load restrictions. Plans to replace all 24 cables are scheduled for summer of 2024. The bridge was repaired and both lanes open by February 2025.

== DCBC proposal ==
=== Initial proposal and development ===
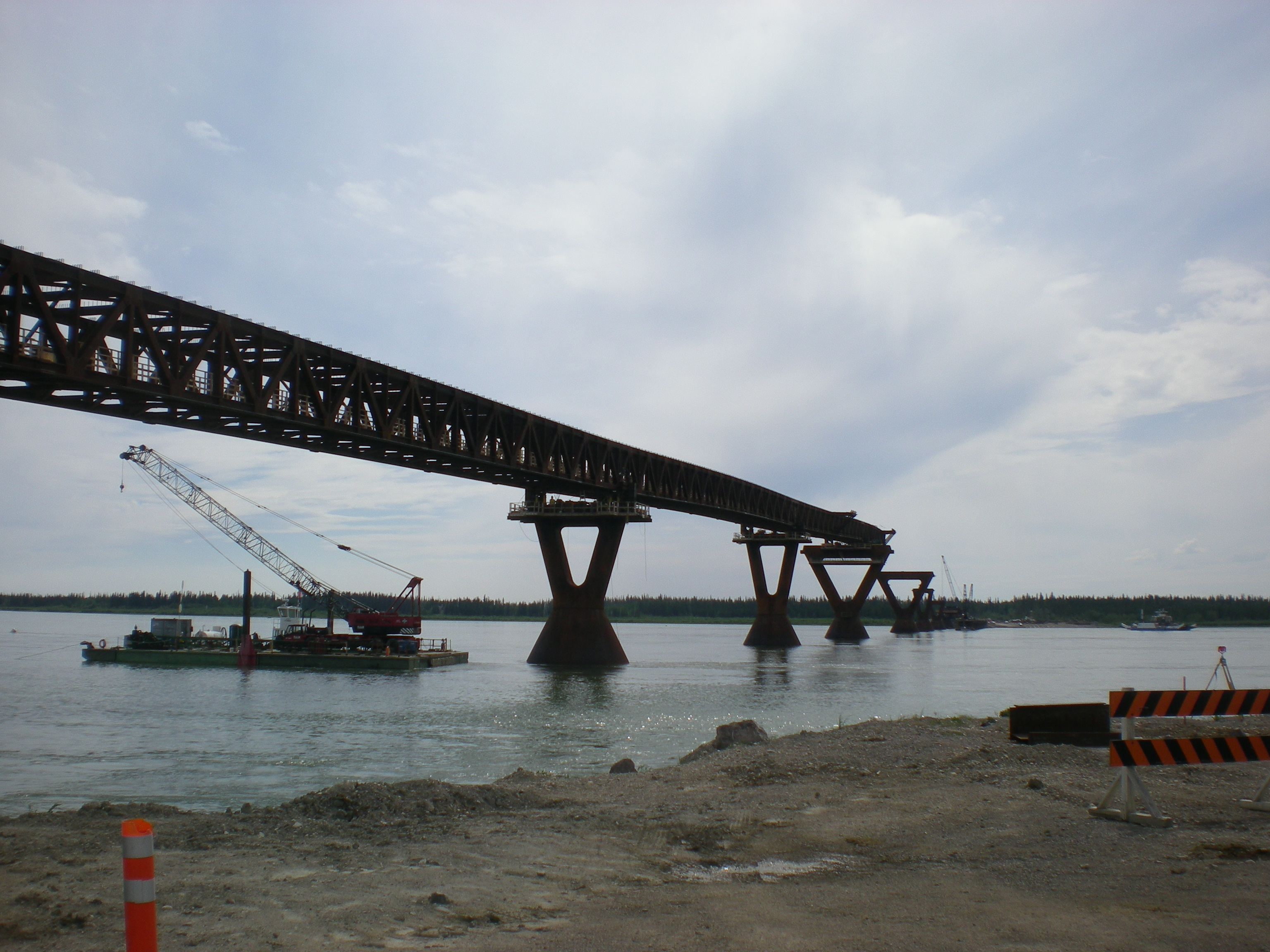
The bridge from the north or Fort Providence side of the Mackenzie River in July 2011

In 2000, the Fort Providence Combined Council Alliance (composed of the area's Dene, Metis and Fort Providence leaders) began considering whether to put together a bridge proposal. They obtained seed money from the territorial and federal governments, and by the end of 2001 had preliminary design and financing concepts. In 2002 a Memorandum of Intent was drafted between the Alliance and the Government of the Northwest Territories (GNWT). The Deh Cho Bridge Corporation (DCBC) was incorporated, and presented a proposal to the Government of the NWT to finance and build the bridge as a public–private partnership. The DCBC would arrange financing, construction and operation of the bridge, which would be leased back to the GNWT for a period of 35 years, in return for annual payments and the proceeds of a toll on commercial vehicle traffic crossing the bridge. After the lease period, ownership of the bridge would revert to the GNWT.

A feasibility study was commissioned, traffic analysis done, and a cost–benefit analysis study based on this was undertaken for the GNWT during 2002–2003. Capital construction costs were estimated at $55 million.

The GNWT passed enabling legislation (the Deh Cho Bridge Act) in June 2003, allowing it to enter into concession agreements for a bridge. The DCBC obtained a $3 million funding commitment from the federal Indian and Northern Affairs Canada department in 2004, and initially hoped to complete agreements with the GNWT and begin construction in that year.

However, the bridge proposal required regulatory review from the Mackenzie Valley Environmental Impact Review Board, which was finalized in March 2005. Requirements for final engineering and financial plans further delayed a concession agreement with the GNWT. Tenders in 2005 and 2006 did not produce any offers at a suitable price. These delays also resulted in less than half of the $3 million federal contribution being obtained, as the remaining funding expired.

By 2007, citing inflationary increases in infrastructure construction costs, the proposed capital costs had risen to $165 million. This necessitated similar scale increases in the proposed annual payments from the GNWT to the DCBC over the life of the agreement to keep the project financially viable.

=== Concession agreement ===
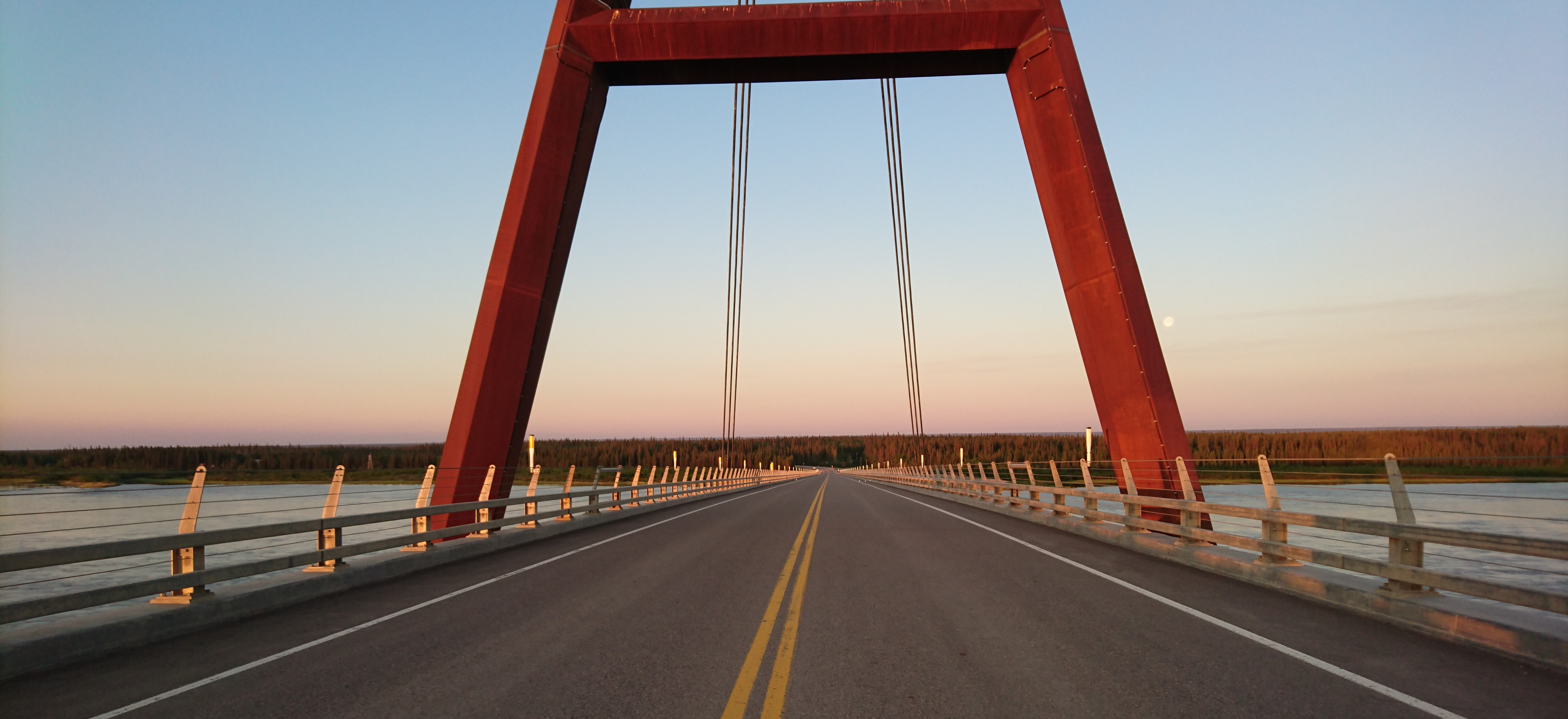
Looking from the top of the bridge to the south end

After lengthy negotiation, in 2007 public statements by the GNWT and others indicated that final agreements were close with the DCBC. A ceremonial celebration occurred in Fort Providence in August 2007 to mark the decision to proceed.

On September 28, 2007, the GNWT entered into the Deh Cho Bridge Project Concession Agreement with the DCBC. Further amendments were made February 22, 2008, although the document was not made public until after that time.

In 2010 the DCBC was declared in default by its lenders, the project was taken over by the GNWT, and the Concession Agreement was terminated.

=== Tolls ===
The Deh Cho Bridge Act includes provision for tolls based on the (now terminated) Concession Agreement. Tolls are only charged to commercial vehicles that are travelling north and weigh over 4,500 kg (9,900 lb); private vehicles do not pay tolls.

The original monthly fees were for three types of vehicles and the rates per month for "tractor-trains" of 7 axles or more was $275, "tractor-trailers" of 4-6 axles paid $150, and trucks with 2-3 axles paid $75. These rates were for registered users with transponders; single-use permits had an additional $16.25 service charge. The toll rates were later changed to cover four types of commercial vehicles based on the number of axles. Toll rates have increased based on inflation and as of April 1, 2016 the tolls had risen to $78 for 2 to 4 axles, $157 for 5 or 6 axles, $289 for 7 or 8 axles and $380 for 9 axles or more. The corresponding charges for single use are $97, $175, $307 and $398.

== Design ==
The original design was completed by JR Spronken and Associates Ltd. of Calgary in 2002. Following the GNWT's independent review, performed by its consultants BPTEC of Edmonton and T. Y. Lin International of San Francisco, recommendations for changes to the superstructure design were made. Infinity Engineering Group of Vancouver carried out the redesign and is now the design engineer firm on the project.

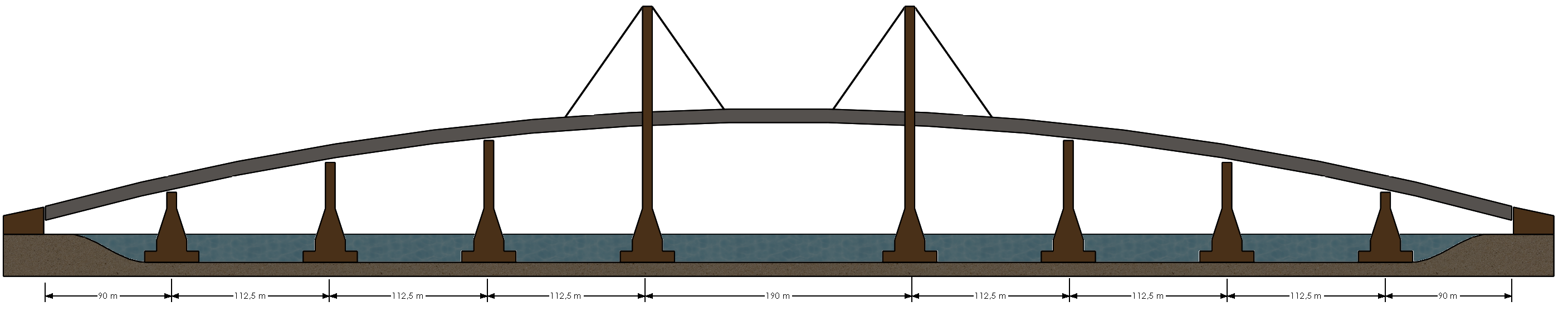
Diagram of the bridge as shown in 2012

Infinity Engineering Group's project description says:

The superstructure is a two lane, nine-span composite steel truss bridge with a cable assisted main span of 190 m (623 ft),. The approach spans are symmetrical about the centre of the bridge and have successive lengths of 90 m (295 ft), 112.5 m (369 ft), 112.5 m (369 ft) and 112.5 m (369 ft). The total length of the bridge is 1,045 m (3,428 ft). The superstructure consists of two 4.5 m (14 ft 9 in), deep Warren trusses with a transverse spacing of 7.32 m (24 ft), and a 235 mm (9.25 in), thick precast composite deck. The truss members are built up I-sections. Two A-pylons, located at Pier IV South and Pier IV North, each support two cable planes. Each cable plane consists of six cables that are connected to the main truss through an outrigger system.

The bridge makes significant use of weathering steel and is not painted, reducing maintenance costs and extending the projected lifetime. It has fairly minimal lighting, citing dark-adaptation for drivers and reduced risk to migratory birds.

=== Stay cable measurements ===
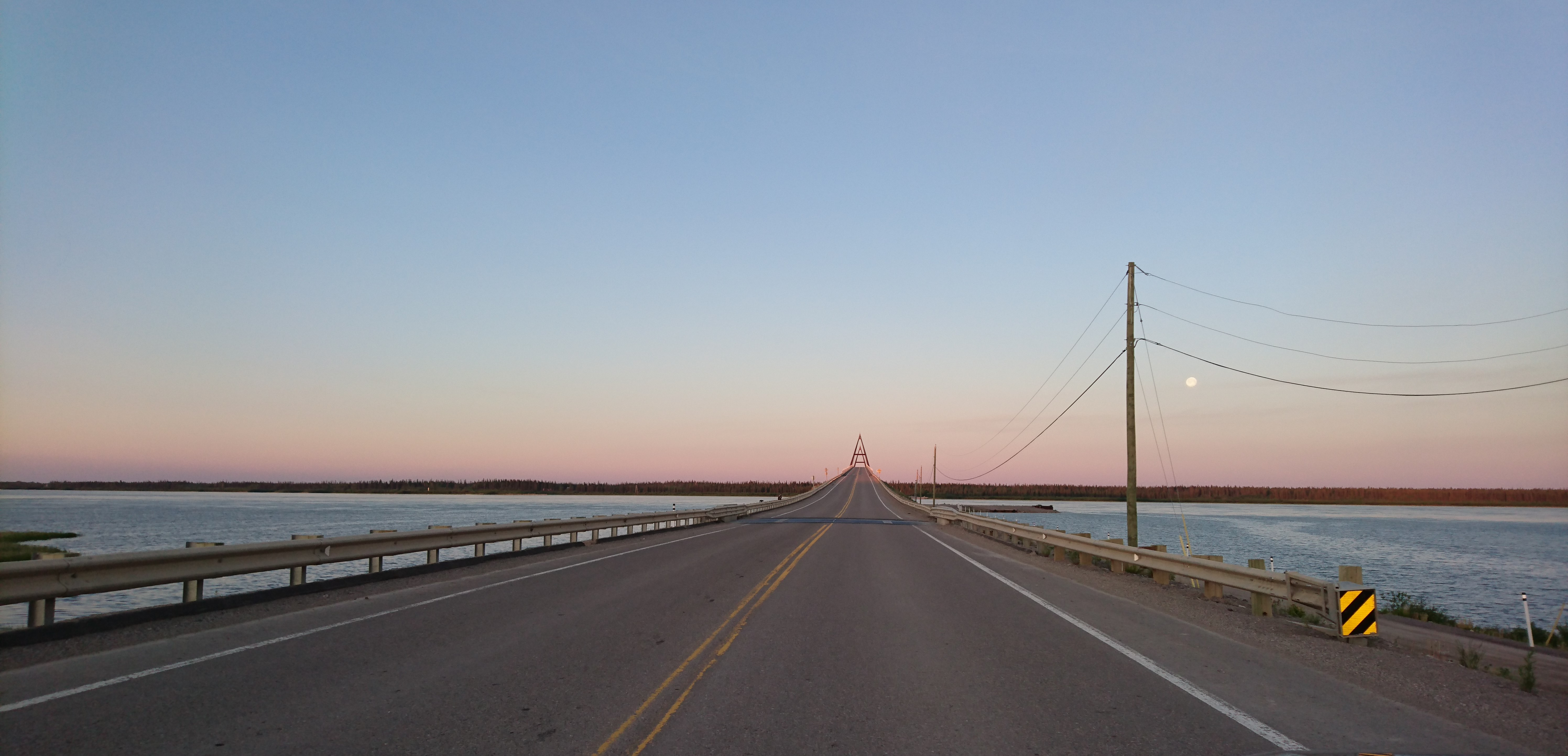
Looking up the bridge from the north or Fort Providence side. A cattle grid to stop bison crossing can be seen.

Extreme weather conditions, seismic movements or corrosion can have a significant impact on cable force distribution, affecting the fatigue lifespan of stay cables. For maintaining stay cable bridges tension force measurements reveal such problems at an early stage so that they can be addressed properly.

A laser vibrometer provides long range, non contact, fast and accurate measurement of vibrating cables. Polytec, Inc. and Metro Testing Laboratories Ltd, British Columbia, Canada, have joined forces to analyze structural data to determine the tension force. Polytec's vibrometer was able to generate data for up to 10 cables of the Deh Cho Bridge per hour. These preventative measures and maintenance of structures are cost effective in the long run because they ensure the structural integrity of the cables.

== Cost and financing ==
The original construction budget was $169 million. This was mainly financed by the issuance in 2008 of $165.4 million in inflation-linked real return bonds, paying 3.17% plus inflation adjustment. The bonds will be repaid over a 35-year period from December 2011 (interest only was paid from 2008). This will amount to approximately $275 million in principal and interest costs over the 35 years, before the inflation adjustments.

With the construction difficulties that caused the GNWT to assume control of the project in 2010, another $15.9 million in financing was required, which was provided by the government in its 2012/2013 capital estimates and brought the construction budget to $182 million. A further $10 million announced as being required in June 2012, brought the construction budget to $202 million.

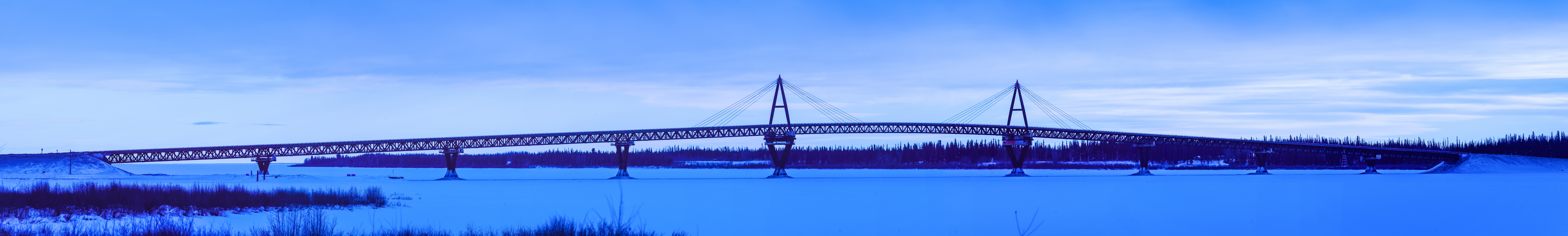
Early dawn, Deh Cho Bridge

Some items are not included in this figure, including costs for building toll plazas and other toll infrastructure (estimated at $1 million), (Note: No toll infrastructure was built as the bridge uses a type of open road tolling/electronic toll collection. All tolls are collected on-line or using a remittance form.) compensation for lost fish habitat, and environmental remediation. The cost of various remediation repairs to the original Atcon Phase 1 work is not included; this is being paid for by the $13.3 million construction bond funded by the Government of New Brunswick. Also not included are the indirect costs of the most recent delay to 2012 in opening the bridge; a year's worth of uncollected tolls and additional ferry operation.

The bridge now having been built, annual expenditures by the GNWT will approach $9 million, including principal and interest repayment, toll collection costs, bridge maintenance and the Opportunities grant to Fort Providence community groups. Along with the tolls, the government will save an estimated $3 million annual savings in ferry costs, but is anticipating a further subsidy requirement of around $2 million annually, depending on traffic volumes.

== Project and construction difficulties ==
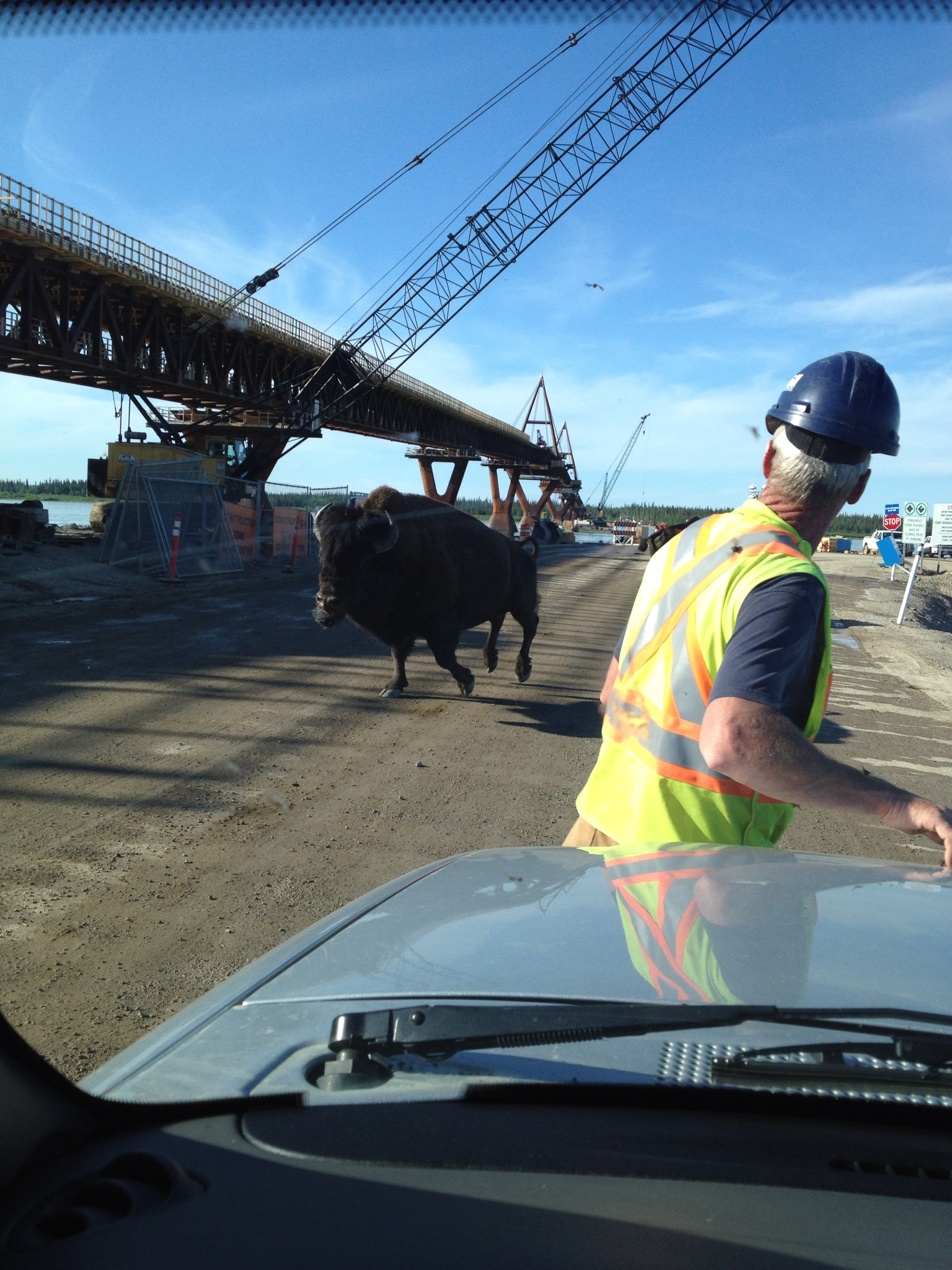
A bison at Deh Cho Bridge during construction

Actual construction began in June 2008, with an opening date then estimated as late 2010. Work was completed on the approaches and support piers, although the final approved designs for the superstructure were not yet complete. The four piers on the south side were put in place in 2008, and the four northern piers during 2009.

=== Delay and redesign ===
During final approval of the bridge plans by the GNWT and its outside technical advisors, inadequacies relating to the design of the superstructure were discovered. A delay in the construction schedule to allow for investigation of design changes was announced, and the opening date pushed back by a year to late 2011.

=== General contractor terminated ===
As of December 30, 2009, Atcon Construction's role as general contractor for bridge construction was terminated by the DCBC, which announced that an agreement could not be reached on a price for the revised superstructure. Atcon Construction (as well as a number of other companies in the Atcon Group) were placed in bankruptcy receivership in March 2010; In October, the bankruptcy receivers submitted a termination claim for $5.3 million (including $650,000 of equity); the GNWT (which had superseded the DCBC) disputed many of the claims. In November 2012 an agreement was reached to settle all claims for $1.3 million, and the receiver filed with the bankruptcy court to approve this in April 2013.

The Government of New Brunswick had guaranteed a $13.3 million letter of credit to Atcon as part of its construction bond, and initially indicated this would likely be released back to them. However, before it expired as of November 2010, the NWT government arranged for New Brunswick to pay out the entire amount into an account for correcting deficiencies in Atcon's work. At least $5.6 million of this has been spent, although the final total is as yet undetermined. Any surplus would be returned to the Government of New Brunswick.

=== Announcement of 2010 cost increase ===
On February 12, 2010, the GNWT announced that costs associated with the redesign and delay had increased the costs of the bridge by at least $15 million, to $182 million, and shortly thereafter the NWT Legislature approved the funds. The GNWT also announced it would take over project management from the DCBC, and on March 3 the GNWT announced its new construction and management team, which included existing contractor Ruskin Construction as the new general contractor, and Associated Engineering for project management.

=== Reversion to the GNWT ===
On March 8, 2010, the GNWT announced that it would seek the necessary authority to assume the assets and debt of the Deh Cho Bridge Corporation. This would place the responsibility for debt management with the GNWT. Previously the debt had been nominally listed in the government's consolidated accounts, as it was the ultimate guarantor, but the amounts were not part of the government's debt for purposes of calculating its authorized borrowing limits. As this total debt ceiling limit is currently set at $500 million by agreement with the federal government, incorporating the bridge debt became a significant issue.

The NWT Legislature was specially recalled and met from March 23-25th to discuss the bridge. Legislation was passed to assume the debt and associated responsibilities to the lenders. The Assembly also passed a motion recommending that the Auditor General of Canada be requested to undertake a special audit of the project. Auditor General Sheila Fraser agreed to do so, and the audit was submitted to the Assembly in March 2011.

In June, an understanding (known as the Transition Letter) was signed between the GNWT and the DCBC, providing for the termination of the concession agreement, and the transfer of the bridge, contracts, and most assets to the GNWT. In a separate Community Opportunities and Involvement Agreement the GNWT undertook to provide $8,000 per month through March 2012 (a total of $167,000) to promote community involvement in the bridge project. From 2012, an annual $200,000 grant will be paid for 35 years (a total of $7 million) for projects to provide community benefits and economic opportunities related to the bridge. The 35-year period is that of the original concession agreement, and the payments provide a replacement for the equity return it would have generated.

Lawsuits from the former project developer, Andrew Gamble, and the former project engineer, Jivko Jivkov, claiming at total of $1.3 million, were withdrawn and a confidential settlement reached in March 2011 for what the government described as "...well below the amount that was claimed...".

=== Construction delay to 2012 and $10 million cost increase ===
Late steel shipments from Structal-Bridges of Quebec in the fall of 2010 caused delays in installing trusses on the south side of the bridge, which had been scheduled to have been finished by March 2011. This resulted in deck panels not being finished until October, at which time temperatures were too low to cover them in concrete. This, along with paving and other final work, was delayed until the following spring, The completion date was delayed to late 2012, and $10 million of GNWT funds were required (not including the lost toll revenue and the costs of an additional year of bridge and ferry operations), bringing the estimated construction budget at the time to $192 million.

=== Additional $10 million required for timely completion ===
In June 2012, the Minister of Finance announced that yet another $10 million would be required to accelerate construction and ensure the Bridge was completed by the November target date. The funding was portrayed as part of an overall settlement with Ruskin (the new general contractor) over various claims, and as providing cost and schedule certainty in the face of unresolved (and unspecified) claims by Ruskin.

== Reports ==
=== Levelton report ===
After taking over responsibility for the project, the GNWT and its project management team (Associated Engineering) commissioned an audit of the Phase 1 construction work (that carried out before April 1, 2010). The report was completed in November 2010, and released to the public in January 2011. Levelton found a number of issues related to design responsibility, quality control and construction, which the GNWT has or is in the process of addressing.

=== Auditor General's report ===
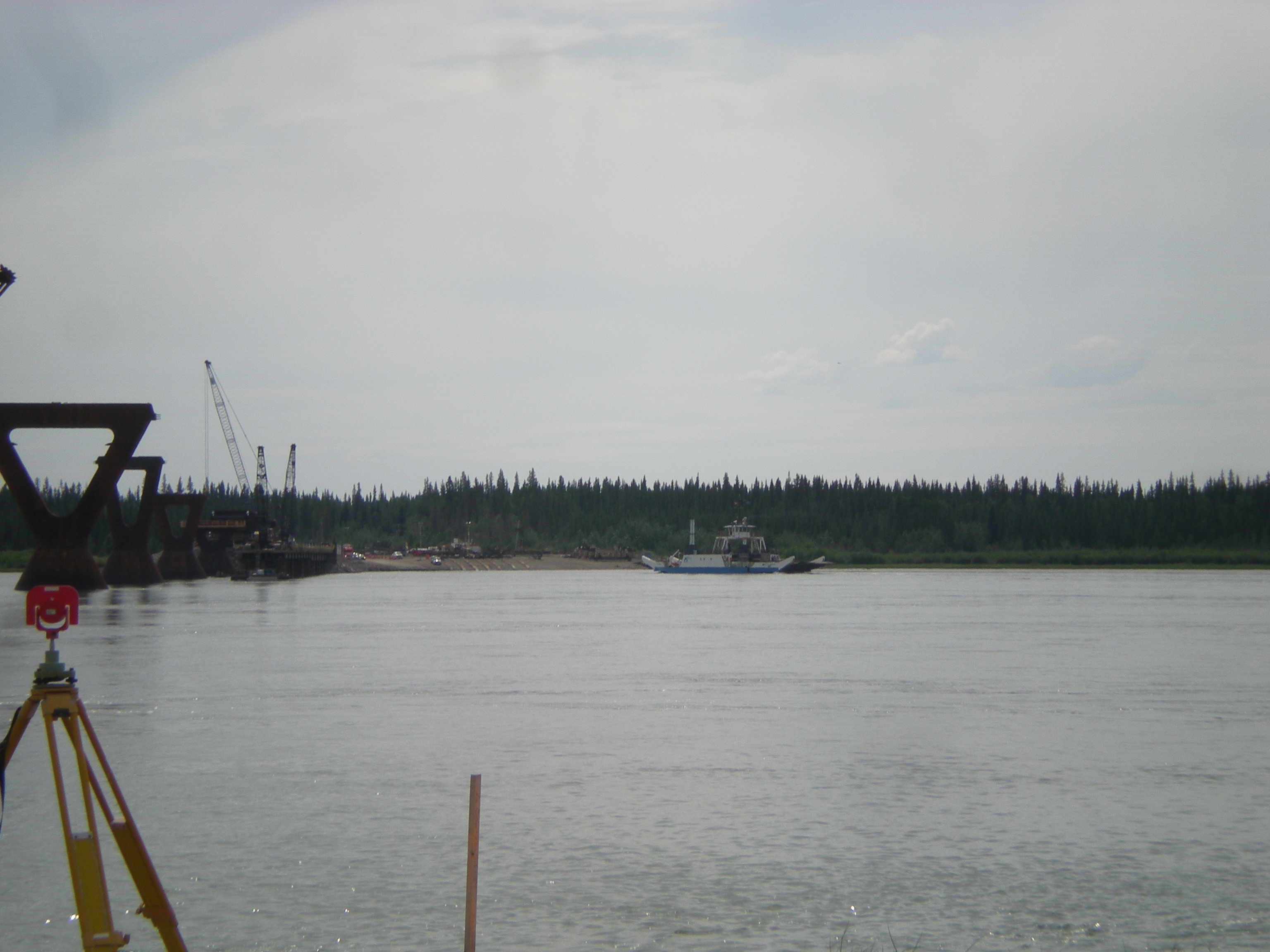
Looking towards the south side of the river with the Merv Hardie ferry in view

In March 2010 the NWT Legislative Assembly requested that the auditor general of Canada conduct a special audit of the GNWT's risk management of the project and the public-private partnership undertaking. The report was made public in March 2011. The audit did not cover any private sector organizations, such as the Deh Cho Bridge Corporation or its contractors. Some key findings of the report include:

- "The project was not a public-private partnership. The Concession Agreement assigned most of the project risks to the GNWT and did not shift any significant risk to the private sector; risk sharing was anticipated when a P3 procurement strategy was selected."
- "Despite unresolved design issues between the Department and the Corporation, the GNWT authorized bridge construction to begin without having the assurance of a fully developed design. As a result, the risk to the project was significantly increased. Ultimately the inability to resolve design issues within the specified time frame resulted in the lenders declaring the Corporation to be in default and requesting the GNWT to assume the project debt."
- "...a risk that the traffic availability date of November 2011 will not be met...a risk that the project could require more resources than those that had been approved."

== Award - Gustav Lindenthal Medal ==
The bridge was awarded the 2013 Gustav Lindenthal Medal for "demonstrating harmony with the environment, aesthetic merit and successful community participation" by the International Bridge Conference. Steven Sternberger, presenting the award, said "The Deh Cho Bridge stands as a commendable example of using innovative design to meet stringent challenges, such as site conditions and location, schedule and budget constraints, while also creating an iconic, landmark structure".

== See also ==
- List of bridges in Canada
