= Mackenzie Delta (electoral district) =

Territorial electoral district in the Northwest Territories, Canada

Northwest Territories electoral district
- Boundaries of Mackenzie Delta

Territorial electoral district
- Legislature: Legislative Assembly of the Northwest Territories
MLA
George Nerysoo
- First contested: 1954
- Last contested: 2023
- Region: Inuvik Region
- Communities: Aklavik, Fort McPherson, Tsiigehtchic

Mackenzie Delta is a territorial electoral district for the Legislative Assembly of the Northwest Territories, Canada. The district consists of Aklavik, Fort McPherson and Tsiigehtchic.

== History ==
The district was created when Mackenzie West was split into this district and Mackenzie River. In its first incarnation after redistribution in 1954 it covered the communities of Paulatuk, Stanton, Tuktoyaktuk, Reindeer Depot, Aklavik, Fort McPherson, Arctic Red River (Tsiigehtchic), Fort Good Hope and East Branch. The district was abolished for the first time in 1975 and recreated again in 1979.

== Members of the Legislative Assembly (MLAs) ==
Name	Elected	Left Office
Frank Carmichael	1954	1957
Knut Lang	1957	1964
Lyle Trimble	1964	1970 or 1975
Richard Nerysoo	1979	1995
David Krutko	1995	2011
Frederick Blake, Jr.	2011	2023
George Nerysoo	2023	present

== Election results ==
=== 2023 election ===
2023 Northwest Territories general election
Candidate	Votes	%
George Nerysoo	233	37.04
Frederick Blake Jr. (I.S.)	220	34.98
Richard Ross Jr.	176	27.98
Total votes	629	

=== 2019 election ===
2019 Northwest Territories general election
Candidate	Votes
Frederick Blake, Jr.	Acclaimed
Source(s) "Eight ridings to watch in the Northwest Territories' election". CBC.

=== 2015 election ===
2015 Northwest Territories general election
Candidate	Votes	%
Frederick Blake, Jr.	313	48.0
William Firth	137	21.0
Norman Snowshoe	116	17.8
David Krutko	86	13.2

=== 2011 election ===
2011 Northwest Territories general election
Candidate	Votes
Frederick Blake, Jr.	190
Taig Connell	150
Eugene Pascal	132
Mary Clark	89
Glenna Hansen	66

=== 2007 election ===
2007 Northwest Territories general election
Candidate	Votes	%
David Krutko	303	50.33%
Mary Joanne Clark	164	27.24%
Donald Robert	132	21.93%
Total valid ballots / Turnout	599	61.12%
Rejected ballots	3	
Source(s) "Official Voting Results 2007 General Election" (PDF). Elections NWT. Archived from the original (PDF) on 11 April 2008.

=== 2003 election ===
2003 Northwest Territories general election
Candidate	Votes
David Krutko	Acclaimed
Source(s) "Official Voting Results 2003 General Election" (PDF). Elections NWT. Archived from the original (PDF) on 11 April 2008.

=== 1999 election ===
1999 Northwest Territories general election
Candidate	Votes	%
David Krutko	444	74.75%
Grace Blake	150	25.25%
Total valid ballots / Turnout	594	65.65%
Rejected ballots	6	
Source(s) "Official Voting Results 1999 General Election" (PDF). Elections NWT. Archived from the original (PDF) on 11 April 2008.

=== 1995 election ===
1995 Northwest Territories general election
Candidate	Votes	%
David Krutko	350	45.36%
Richard Nerysoo	218	28.24%
Charles Furlong	204	26.42%
Total valid ballots / Turnout	772	70.5%

=== 1991 election ===
1991 Northwest Territories general election
Candidate	Votes	%
Richard Nerysoo	407	55.53%
Roger Allen	326	44.47%
Total valid ballots / Turnout	733	71.3%
Rejected ballots	1	
Source(s) "Report of the Chief Electoral Officer on the Elections of Members to the Council of the Northwest Territories, 1991" (PDF). Elections Northwest Territories.

=== 1987 election ===
1987 Northwest Territories general election
Candidate	Votes
Richard Nerysoo	?
?	?

=== 1983 election ===
1983 Northwest Territories general election
Candidate	Votes
Richard Nerysoo	?
?	?

=== 1979 election ===
1979 Northwest Territories general election
Candidate	Votes	%
Richard Nerysoo	224	64.55
Lawrence Firth	123	35.45
Total valid ballots / Turnout	347	46.68%
Rejected ballots	5	
Source(s) "REPORT OF THE CHIEF ELECTORAL OFFICER ON THE GENERAL ELECTION OF MEMBERS TO THE COUNCIL OF THE NORTHWEST TERRITORIES 1979" (PDF). Elections NWT. January 1980.

=== 1970 election ===
1970 Northwest Territories general election
Candidate	Votes
Lyle Trimble	?
John Tetlichi	?
Claire Barnabe	?

=== 1967 election ===
1967 Northwest Territories general election
Candidate	Votes
Lyle Trimble	Acclaimed
Source(s) "Territories Election Results Still In Doubt". Calgary Herald. 5 July 1967. p. 2.

=== 1964 election ===
1964 Northwest Territories general election
Candidate	Votes
Lyle Trimble	?
?	?

=== 1960 election ===
1960 Northwest Territories general election
Candidate	Votes
Knut Lang	?
?	?

=== 1957 election ===
1957 Northwest Territories general election
Candidate	Votes
Knut Lang	?
?	?

=== 1954 election ===
1954 Northwest Territories general election
Candidate	Votes	%
Frank Carmichael	353	54.31%
James Edward Sittichinli	297	45.69%
Total valid ballots / Turnout	650	66.54%
Rejected ballots	28	
Source(s) Cloutier, Edmomd (1955). Report of the Chief Electoral Officer. Queen's Printer.

== Notes ==
a: In the 2007 election, percentages assigned to candidates were based on the total votes cast. In prior elections the percentages were based on the valid votes.

== See also ==
- List of Northwest Territories territorial electoral districts
- Canadian provincial electoral districts
