= Tsiigehtchic =

Tsiigehtchic Tsiigehtshik
- Hamlet
- Hamlet of Tsiigehtchic
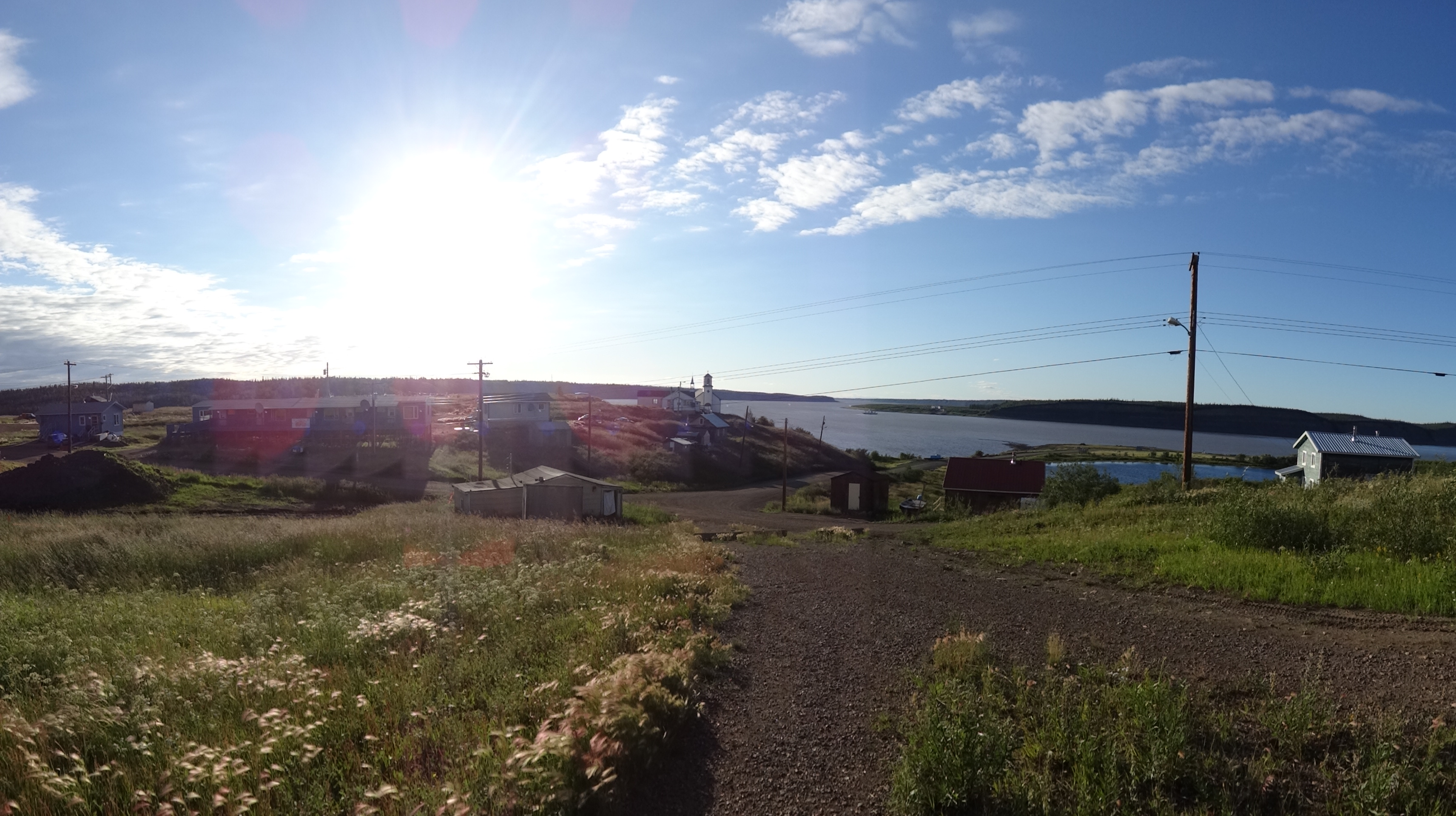
- The Church in Tsiigehtchic with the Arctic Red River and Mackenzie River in the background

- Location within Northwest Territories Location within Canada
- Coordinates: 67°26′26″N 133°44′43″W
- Country: Canada
- Territory: Northwest Territories
- Region: Inuvik Region
- Electoral district: Mackenzie Delta
- Census division: Region 1
- Mission: 1868
- Charter Community: 21 June 1993
- Hamlet: 1 July 2024

Government
  - Mayor: Shawn James Roland VanLoon
  - SAO: Jolene Blake
  - MLA: Frederick Blake Jr.

Area (2021)
  - Land: 47.89 km^{2} (18.49 sq mi)
- Elevation: 6 m (20 ft)

Population (2021)
  - Total: 138
  - Density: 2.9/km^{2} (7.5/sq mi)
- Time zone: UTC−06:00 (Northwest Territories Time)
- Postal code: X0E 0B0
- Area code: 867
- Telephone exchange: 953
- Living cost: 167.5^{A}
- Food price index: 170.3^{B}
- Sources: Department of Municipal and Community Affairs, Prince of Wales Northern Heritage Centre, Canada Flight Supplement^A2013 figure based on Edmonton = 100^B2015 figure based on Yellowknife = 100

Tsiigehtchic (/ˈtsiːɡɛtʃɪk/ TSEE-getch-ik; "mouth of the iron river"), officially the Hamlet of Tsiigehtchic, is a Gwichʼin community located at the confluence of the Mackenzie and the Arctic Red Rivers, in the Inuvik Region of the Northwest Territories, Canada. The community was formerly known as Arctic Red River, until 1 April 1994. The Gwichya Gwich'in First Nation is located in Tsiigehtchic.

== History ==
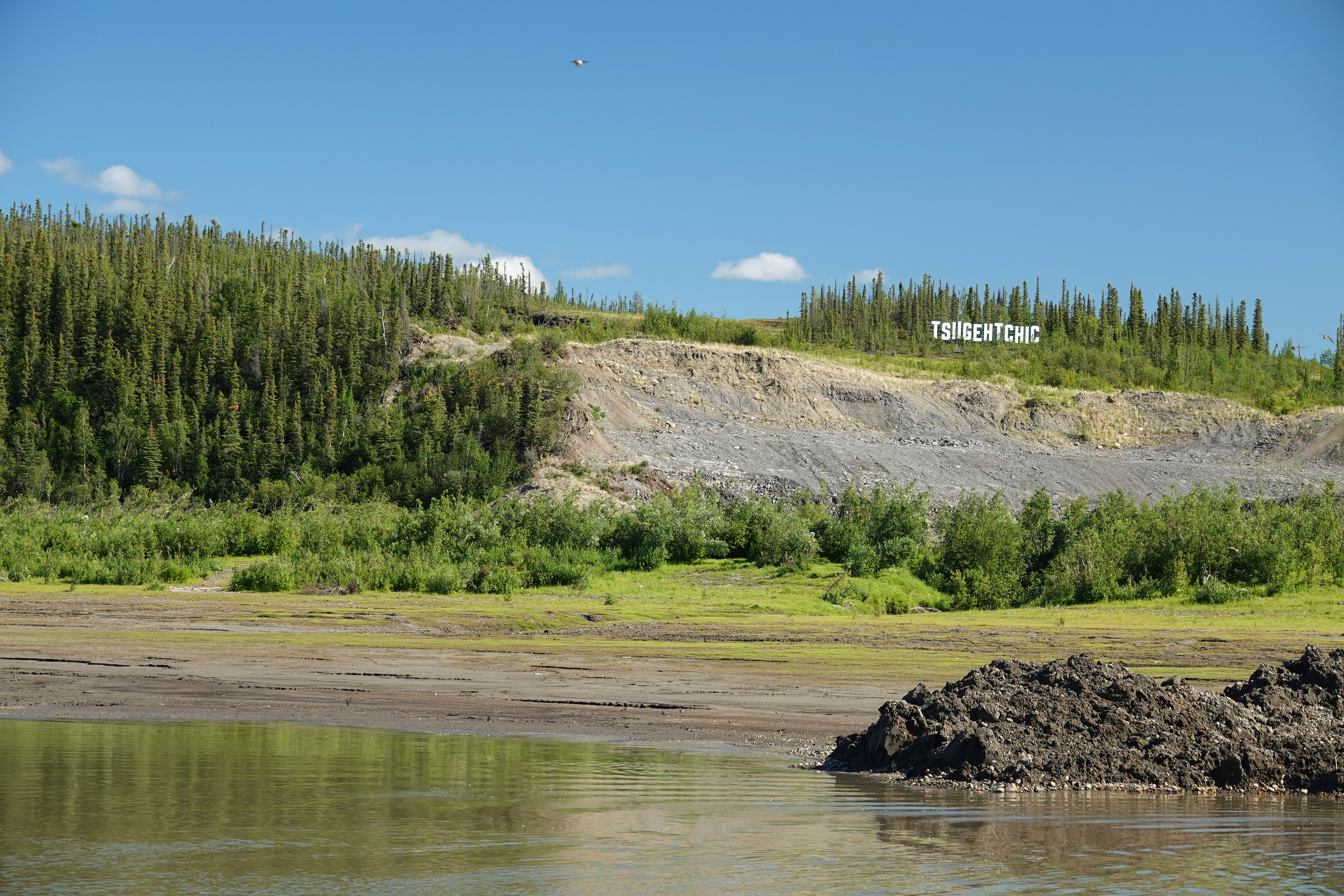
Large letters spelling out "Tsiigehtchic," visible from the Dempster Highway

=== Ancient history ===
Archaeology and oral history indicate that the flats below Tsiigehtchic have been used for the past 1,400 years by the Gwichyaa Gwichʼin, for various activities which were both commercial and recreational. The Gwich’in name for the flats is Łèth T’urh Kak (“on the mud flats”).

=== Late modern period and the first European contact ===
The first European contact with the Gwichya Gwich’in occurred in the summer of 1789, just prior to the late modern period, when Alexander Mackenzie reached the area with his party of explorers.

=== Contemporary history ===
In 1825, John Franklin, inspired by Mackenzie's travel, reached into the area.

The very first permanent settlement here began due to European intervention, with the establishment of a Catholic mission in 1868, which would then be soon followed by a Hudson's Bay Company trading post in the 1870s.

In May 2023, the community of Tsiigehtchic voted to change from being a charter community to a hamlet. The change occurred on 1 July 2024 and the community finally became a hamlet with the swearing in of the mayor and councillors on 15 January 2025.

== Demographics ==
Federal census population history of Tsiigehtchic
Year	Pop.	±%
1976	121	—
1981	120	−0.8%
1986	108	−10.0%
1991	144	+33.3%
1996	162	+12.5%
2001	195	+20.4%
2006	175	−10.3%
2011	143	−18.3%
2016	172	+20.3%
2021	138	−19.8%
Source: Statistics Canada

Annual population estimates

Year	Pop.	±%
1996	168	—
1997	169	+0.6%
1998	165	−2.4%
1999	188	+13.9%
2000	192	+2.1%
2001	195	+1.6%
2002	213	+9.2%
2003	209	−1.9%
2004	202	−3.3%
2005	190	−5.9%
2006	181	−4.7%

Year	Pop.	±%
2007	177	−2.2%
2008	159	−10.2%
2009	154	−3.1%
2010	154	+0.0%
2011	152	−1.3%
2012	150	−1.3%
2013	162	+8.0%
2014	167	+3.1%
2015	167	+0.0%
2016	170	+1.8%
2017	179	+5.3%

Sources: NWT Bureau of Statistics (2001 - 2017)

In the 2021 Canadian census conducted by Statistics Canada, Tsiigehtchic had a population of 138 living in 59 of its 73 total private dwellings, a change of −19.8% from its 2016 population of 172. With a land area of 47.89 km^{2} (18.49 sq mi), it had a population density of 2.9/km^{2} (7.5/sq mi) in 2021.

In 2021, nobody identified as Métis or Inuit and twenty as non-Indigenous. The rest of the population (115 people) identified as First Nations. In the same census 20 people said that an Indigenous language (Gwichʼin) was their mother tongue and everybody else choose English. There were 15 people who said that Gwichʼin was the language most often used in the home.

== Transportation ==
The Dempster Highway, NWT Highway 8, crosses the Mackenzie River at Tsiigehtchic. During winter, vehicle traffic is over the ice, during the rest of the year, traffic is carried by the ferry MV Louis Cardinal.

The ferry stops at Tsiigehtchic, on the eastern bank of the Arctic Red River, and on the southwestern and northeastern banks of the Mackenzie River, connecting the two legs of the Dempster Highway. The community is one of the few in the NWT not to be served by a permanent airport.

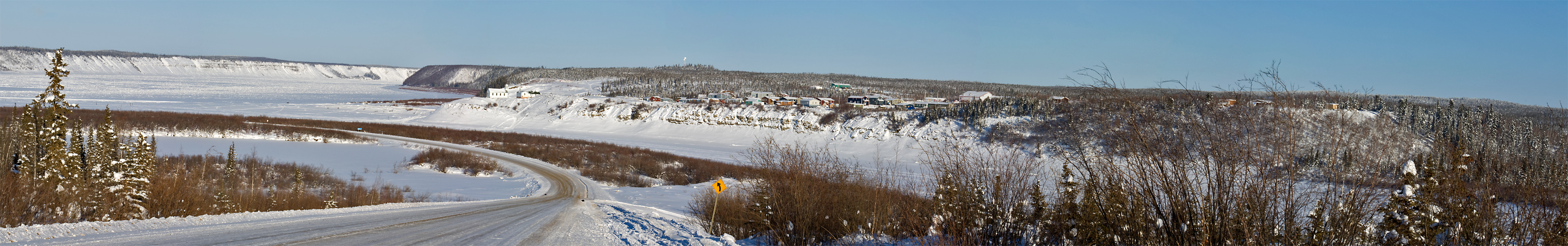
Tsiigehtchic from the Dempster Highway, looking towards Inuvik

== Steppe bison carcass ==
In early September 2007, near Tsiigehtchic, local resident Shane Van Loon discovered a carcass of a steppe bison, which was radiocarbon dated to c. 13,650 cal BP. This carcass appears to represent the first Pleistocene mummified soft tissue remains from the glaciated regions of northern Canada.

== Services ==
Tsiigehtchic has a health centre. Royal Canadian Mounted Police services are provided through Fort McPherson.

== See also ==
- Arctic Red River Water Aerodrome
