= MV Louis Cardinal =

River ferry in Northwest Territories, Canada

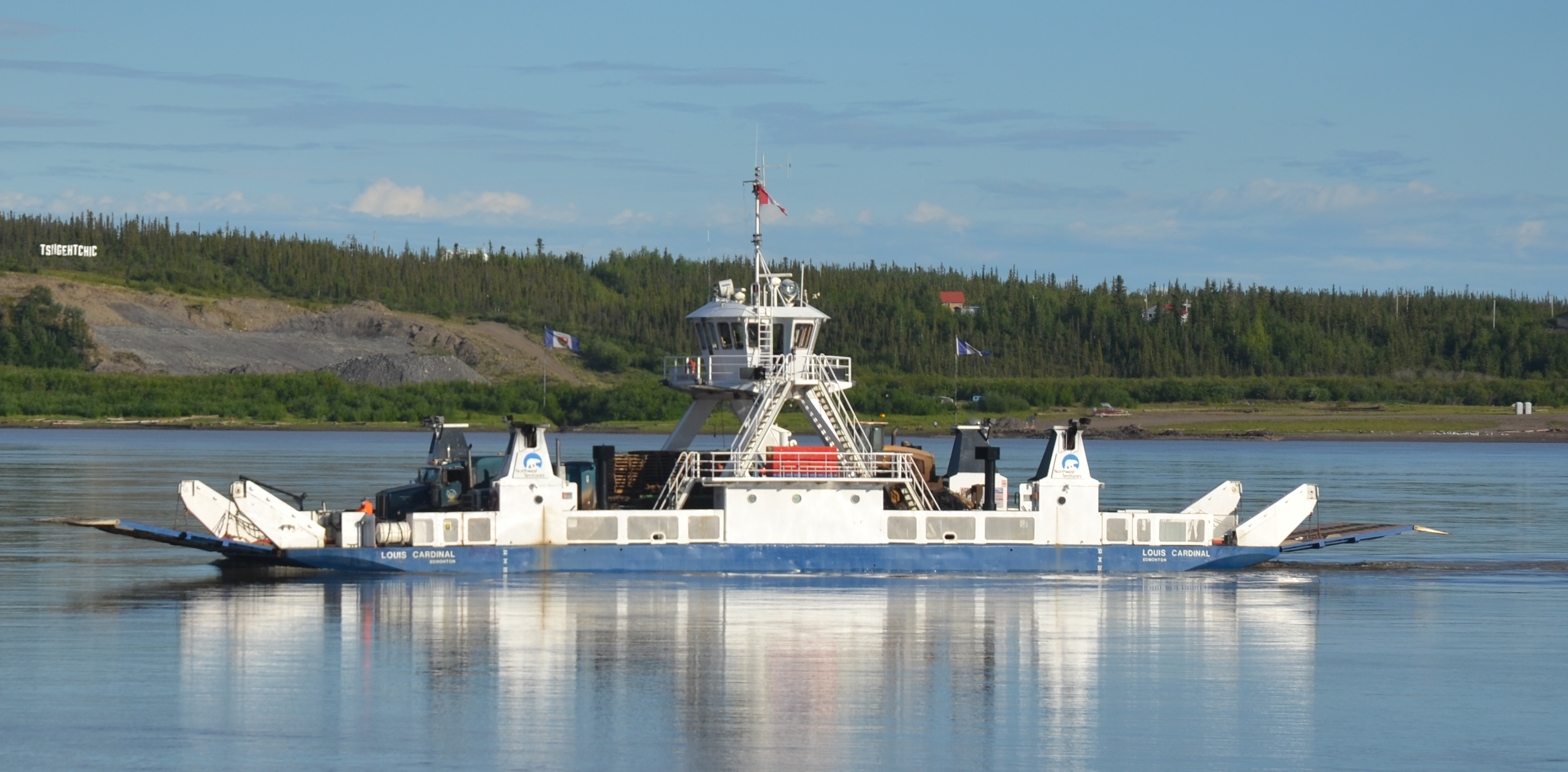
- MV Louis Cardinal

History
- Name: MV Louis Cardinal

General characteristics
- Length: 38.1 m
- Capacity: 21 vehicles, 100 passengers
- Crew: 4

MV Louis Cardinal is a Canadian ferry on the Mackenzie River in the Northwest Territories. The vessel was built in 1972.

Louis Cardinal currently serves the community of Tsiigehtchic, at the confluence of the Mackenzie River and the Arctic Red River. The ferry has three stops, on the eastern shore of the Mackenzie River, and on both shores of the Arctic Red River.

The ferry runs from mid-June to mid-October. After the rivers freeze vehicles cross the rivers on ice roads.

The ferry's crew joined the Public Service Alliance of Canada in January 2006.

== See also ==
- image of the MV Louis Cardinal mirror
