= Fireboats of Toronto =

At least six Fireboats in Toronto have helped protect the city's waterfront and maritime commerce.

name	image	in service	notes
Nellie Bly		1906–1909	Steam tug provided fire protection on Toronto Islands.
T.J. Clark		1909–1923	A private vessel.; Converted to a passenger vessel.; Named for Tom "T.J." Clark, co-operator of wooden screw ferry in Toronto that began service in 1890, it was a part-time fire boat only.
Charles A. Reed		1923–1963?	The city's first full-time official fireboat. Remained in service until 1963.
Rouille later HMCS Rouille		1929–1943	A steam tug used to provide part-time fire service in Toronto Harbour.; Icebreaking tug used to provide part-time fire service by Toronto Harbour Commission from 1929 to 1930s; Built in 1929 by Collingwood Shipyards, it was moved to Halifax in the 1940s for World War II service as HMCS Rouille and sank off Cape Smoky, Nova Scotia in 1954.
William Lyon Mackenzie		1963–present	Custom built fireboat/tug/ice-breaker and named for Toronto's first mayor William Lyon Mackenzie. Remains in active service.
Sora		2005–2015	Formerly a Canadian Coast Guard (CCG) Small Multi Task Utility Craft built in 1982 and retired from CCG in 2005. Acquired as to act as backup to William Lyon Mackenzie but was not used during winter as does not have icebreaking capabilities. Retired October 31, 2015.
William Thornton		October 2015–July 2025	In June 2015 Toronto Fire Services announced that Sora was to be replaced by another former CCG vessel, Cape Hurd, which would be renamed after William Thornton, a 22-year-old volunteer firefighter who died while fighting a fire in 1848. Like Sora, William Thornton does not have icebreaking features.
Fire Boat 334		July 2025-present	Replaces William Thornton. 15.34m Metalcraft Marine Firestorm. Does not have ice breaking features.
Rescue Boat 334		July 2025-present	.* 8.05 m Hurricane Zodiac rescue boat.
