= Flag of Toronto =

City of Toronto
- City of Toronto flag
- Toronto flag
- Use: >
- Proportion: 1:2
- Adopted: November 1999; 27 years ago
- Flag for the pre-amalgamated former City of Toronto
- Use: >
- Proportion: 2:3
- Adopted: 6 November 1974
- Relinquished: 1 January 1998 (Note: In 1998, the City of Toronto Act, 1997 went into effect, dissolving the Metropolitan Toronto region and amalgamating its former lower-tier municipalities into the new City of Toronto.)
- Design: A blue field and a white outline of Toronto City Hall slightly left-of-centre with a red maple leaf at the base.
- Designed by: Renato De Santis

The city flag of Toronto, also known as the Toronto flag, was adopted by Toronto City Council in 1974. It includes a white outline of Toronto City Hall on a blue field, and a red maple leaf at the base of the towers.

The first flag of Toronto was adopted by the former City of Toronto in 1967 and included the city's coat of arms on a blue and white field. However, that flag was replaced by a design by Renato De Santis in 1974, a design that remained in use until 1998, when the former city was amalgamated into the new City of Toronto. A 1:2 proportioned version of De Santis' flag was adopted by the new City of Toronto in 1999.

== Description ==
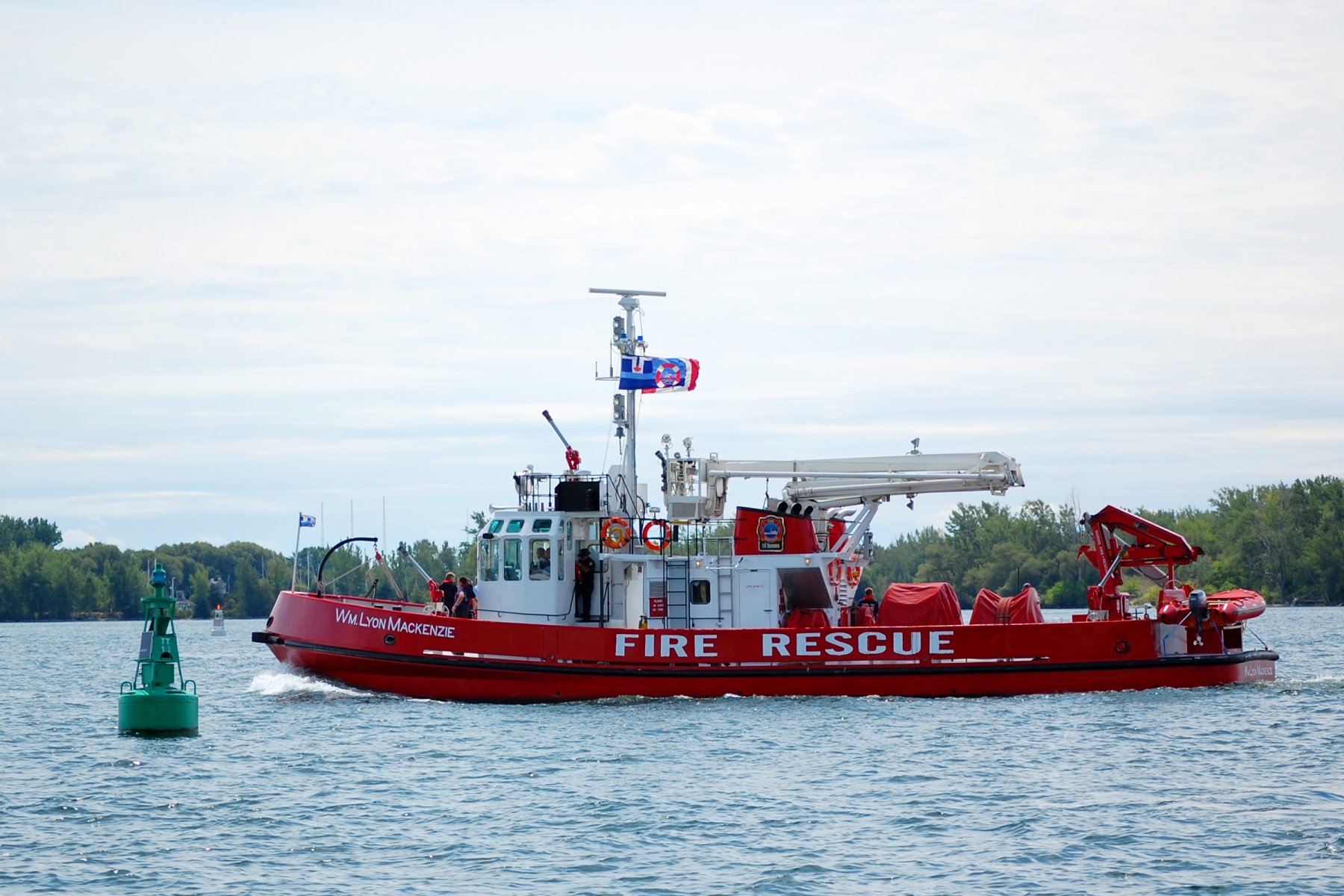
William Lyon Mackenzie, a fireboat of Toronto Fire Services, with an ensign variant of the flag of Toronto

The flag of Toronto includes a white outline of the twin towers of the Toronto City Hall slightly left-of-centre on a blue field. The red maple leaf from the Canadian flag sits at the base of the towers, representing the city council chambers. The shape of the space above and between the towers suggests the letter 'T', the city's initial. The design adopted by the City of Toronto in 1999 is proportioned at 1:2, although its original design created by De Santis was proportioned at 2:3.

As a municipal flag, the flag of Toronto follows the flag of Canada, the flags of other sovereign countries, and flags of provinces and territories in Canadian flag etiquette.

A variation of this flag is used by Toronto Fire Services fireboats. The marine ensign consists of the city's flag in the upper canton, with a lifebuoy on a two-tone blue background.

== History ==
=== Former City of Toronto ===
An early flag of Toronto was designed by the New Zealand architect Eric Arthur and his son, and adopted in 1967 by the former City of Toronto. It featured the city's coat of arms imposed on a blue and white field. The design was criticized by the then mayor of Toronto, William Dennison.

On 28 August 1974, a committee was appointed by Toronto City Council to design a new flag. A competition to design a new flag was launched later that year that was open to all residents of Metropolitan Toronto. More than 700 submissions were received, more than half of which incorporated a maple leaf. A flag design committee, headed by Robert Woadden of the City of Toronto Archives, was created to select submissions from the competition.

The committee eventually submitted its selection to the city council on 6 November 1974, where its members unanimously voted for a design submitted by Renato De Santis, a 21-year-old graphic design student at George Brown College. On 7 November 1974, a flag-raising ceremony was conducted outside Toronto City Hall, where De Santis also received a prize of $500 for winning the competition. The flag used during the flag-raising was later stolen from the flagpole.

=== Amalgamated Toronto ===
Proposed flags for the new City of Toronto

A design recommended and preferred by city staff in 1997.

A design created by a graphic designer during the 1999 flag design competition.

In 1997, a new design competition was launched to find a new flag for the new amalgamated City of Toronto to be formed on 1 January 1998. The design competition in 1997 laid out more specific criteria than the competition in 1974, with designs being limited to three colours and a proportion of 1:2. The competition had a prize of $3000. However, no prize was ever awarded, with city council approving none of the 161 designs submitted they received.

After the design competition, Toronto City Council asked city design staff to submit their own proposals. The council eventually selected a design recommended by councillor Brad Duguid. During the council's review of staff designs, De Santis had suggested his original design be modified to fit the 1:2 proportions desired by the city council. The two designs were put to the public during an open council meeting in November 1999, with De Santis' design being received the most favourably by the public in attendance. The council voted to adopt De Santis' modified old design by a vote of 31 to 14.

== Flags of Metropolitan Toronto ==
From 1954 to 1998, the former city of Toronto and its surrounding municipalities formed a part of an upper-tier municipal government known as Metropolitan Toronto.

By the end of the 1970s, Metropolitan Toronto, along with its six lower-tier municipalities, had adopted regional or municipal flags to represent their respective jurisdictions. East York was the last municipality in Metropolitan Toronto to adopt a municipal flag, having adopted a design in 1978 after holding a flag design contest.

=== Metropolitan Toronto ===
Flag for Metropolitan Toronto

The Metropolitan Toronto government eventually adopted its own flag, which consisted of the region's six-ringed emblem on the left side, representing Metropolitan Toronto's six regions centred vertically on a blue and green background. Use of the Metropolitan Toronto flag was discontinued in 1998 with the dissolution of Metropolitan Toronto and the amalgamation of its lower-tier municipalities into the new City of Toronto.

Proposals have been made to reintroduce a modified version of the Metropolitan Toronto flag as a new flag of Toronto, with its supporters claiming the design better represents the various areas amalgamated into the city.

== See also ==
- List of Canadian flags
- List of city flags in North America
