= William Lyon Mackenzie (disambiguation) =

William Lyon Mackenzie (1795–1861) was a Canadian-American journalist and politician.

William Lyon Mackenzie may also refer to:

- William Lyon Mackenzie Collegiate Institute
- William Lyon Mackenzie (fireboat)

== See also ==
- William Lyon Mackenzie King (1874–1950), tenth Prime Minister of Canada
