= CCGS Sora =

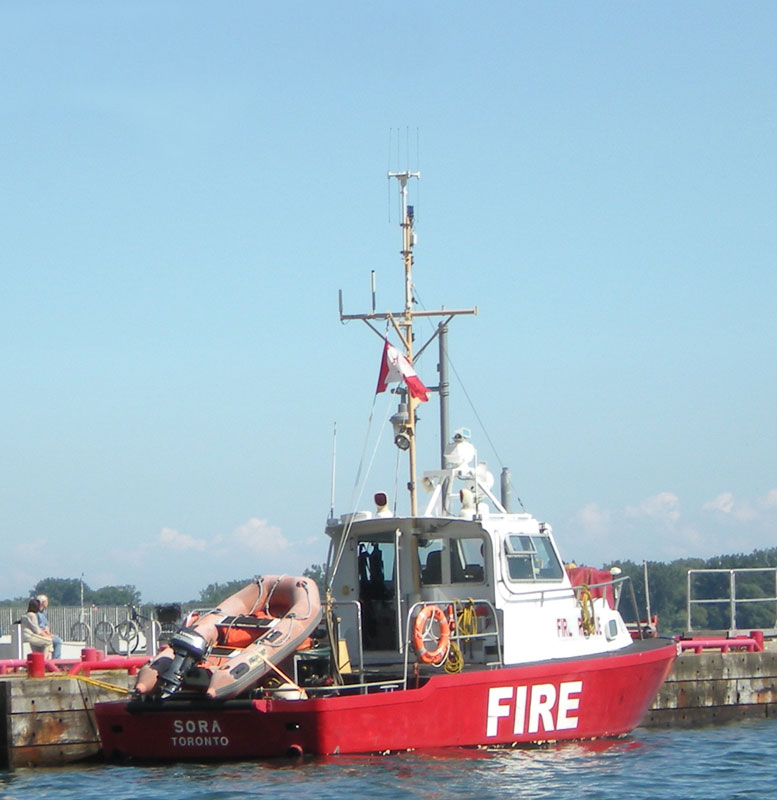
- As the fireboat Sora

History

Canada
- Name: Sora
- Operator: Canadian Coast Guard; Toronto Fire Services
- Builder: Canadian Dredge & Dock Ltd., Kingston
- Commissioned: 1982
- Recommissioned: 2005 with Toronto Fire Services
- Decommissioned: 2005 from CCG
- In service: 1982–2005 (CCG); 2005–2015 (TFS)
- Stricken: 2005
- Home port: CCG Base Amherstburg, Ontario 1982–2005; Toronto Fire Services Station 334: 2005–2015
- Fate: Transferred as reserve ship for the Toronto Fire Services
- Status: Retired with Toronto Fire Services on October 31, 2015

General characteristics
- Type: Multiple Task Utility Craft
- Tonnage: 21 gross tons
- Length: 12.5 m (41 ft 0 in)
- Beam: 4.3 m (14 ft 1 in)
- Draft: 1.24 m (4 ft 1 in)
- Propulsion: Diesel engines
- Speed: 26 knots (48 km/h)
- Range: 300 nautical miles (560 km)
- Endurance: 1 day
- Complement: 3

CCGS Sora was a 12.5 metre small multi-task utility craft that has seen service with the Canadian Coast Guard (CCG) and Toronto Fire Services (TFS). It was deployed for medium range task and perform under moderate to high speed in moderate weather conditions and in sheltered waters in station mode. In 2005, it was purchased by the City of Toronto for use by TFS. It was finally retired in 2015.

== Career with Canadian Coast Guard ==
During her career with the Canadian Coast Guard, Sora was a search and rescue boat along the Detroit River and western Lake Erie.

Her task included:

- towing disabled/grounded light watercraft
- medical evacuation calls
- searching for missing vessels or aircraft over water

The vessel is not ice class and did not operate between December and April.

== Career with Toronto Fire Services ==
She was declared surplus in late 2005 and sold to the City of Toronto in 2006. It was a back-up fireboat for William Lyon Mackenzie. In November 2014, TFS acquired another former CCG vessel, CCGS Cape Hurd, which replaced Sora as its second fireboat

== See also ==
Other utility ships in CCG:

- CCGS Waubuno
- CCGS Bittern
- CCGS CG 119
- CCGS Mallard
- CCGS Osprey
- CCGS Skua
- CCGS Sterne
