= CCGS Cape Hurd =

Canadian Coast Guard vessel

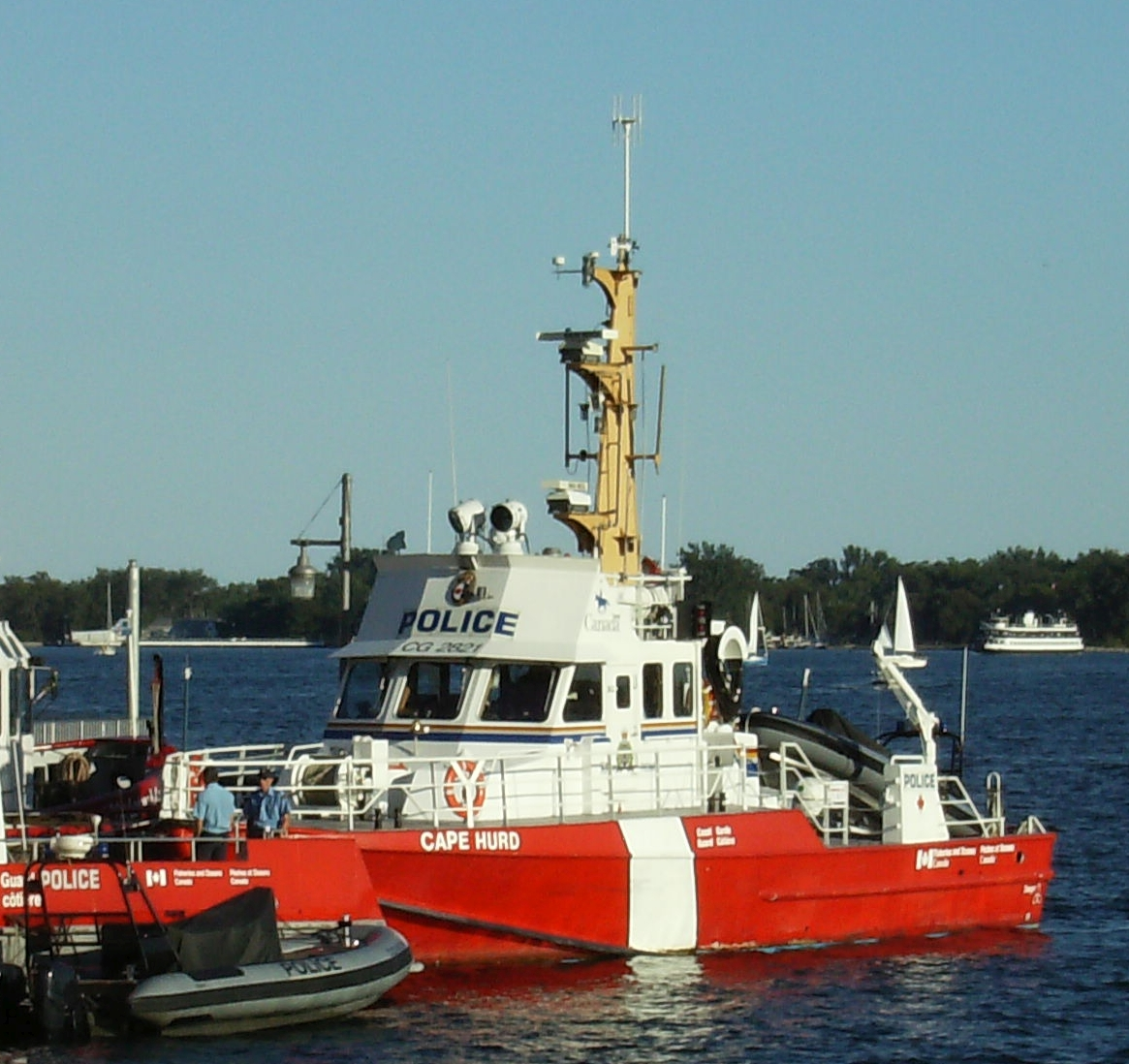
- ex-CCGS Cape Hurd berthed in Toronto

History

Canada
- Name: Cape Hurd; William Thornton
- Operator: Canadian Coast Guard; Toronto Fire Services (City of Toronto government)
- Builder: Breton Industries Limited, Port Hawkesbury, Nova Scotia
- Yard number: 800748
- Launched: 1982
- Christened: 1982
- Completed: 1982
- Acquired: 1982
- Commissioned: 1982
- Recommissioned: 2015 with Toronto Fire Services
- Decommissioned: 2015 from CGS
- In service: 1982–2025
- Stricken: 2015
- Home port: CCG Base Sarnia, Ontario 1982–2015; Toronto Fire Services Station 334: 2015–2025
- Identification: MMSI number: 316007022; Callsign: CG2821
- Fate: Transferred as reserve ship for the Toronto Fire Services
- Status: Retired from CCG in 2015 and active service with TFS from 2015 till 2025.

General characteristics
- Type: Inland waters patrol boat / utility fireboat
- Tonnage: 55 gross tons
- Length: 21.4 m (70 ft 3 in)
- Beam: 5.5 m (18 ft 1 in)
- Draft: 1.3 m (4 ft 3 in)
- Propulsion: 2 MTU 8V396 Diesel engines
- Speed: 18 knots (33 km/h)
- Range: 1,400 nautical miles (2,600 km)
- Endurance: 2 days
- Complement: 4

CCGS Cape Hurd is a 21.4-metre (70 ft) mid-shore patrol vessel formerly serving with the Canadian Coast Guard and last stationed in Sarnia, Ontario. The vessel is classed for inland waters (Great Lakes) with no ice-class. It served as a fireboat in Toronto until 2025.

== History ==
Cape Hurd was built by the now defunct Breton Industries Limited in Port Hawkesbury, Nova Scotia and delivered to the CCG in 1982. The ship was decommissioned by the Coast Guard and acquired by the Toronto Fire Services The ship entered service as William Thornton, named for William Thornton, the first Toronto fire fighter to die on duty. The ship replaced Sora, another ex-Coast Guard vessel. William Thornton is berthed at Station 334 along Queens Quay.

The vessel offers more capability than Sora as backup to the main fireboat William Lyon Mackenzie, but it does not have ice-breaking capabilities and removed from the waters during the winter. The vessel is equipped with a small crane and can launch a RHIB from the rear of the vessel. Upgrades were performed before it entered service with the TFS.
