= Matthew Pegg =

Canadian firefighter

Matthew D. Pegg

Chief of Toronto Fire Services
- In office May 2016 – January 2025
- Mayor: John Tory
- Preceded by: Jim Sales
- Succeeded by: Jim Jessop

President of the Ontario Association of Fire Chiefs
- In office 2013–2015

Deputy Fire Chief, City of Brampton
- In office 2008–2013

Deputy Fire Chief, Town of Ajax
- In office 2002–2008

Deputy Fire Chief, Town of Georgina
- In office 2001–2002

Personal details
- Born: Matthew Pegg; 1973 (age 52–53) Keswick, Ontario, Canada
- Profession: Firefighter

Matthew Pegg is a Canadian firefighter most recently serving as the fourth chief of Toronto Fire Services (TFS) from May 2016 to January 2025. He was succeeded by Chief Jim Jessop.

Pegg was also appointed general manager of emergency management for the City of Toronto in 2018.

In March 2020, Chief Pegg, as the general manager of the Toronto Office of Emergency Management, was appointed to lead the City of Toronto's response to the COVID-19 pandemic. As the incident commander for the COVID-19 pandemic, he led the development and operation of the most complex incident management system in Toronto's history, including the longest-ever continuous deployment of the Emergency Operations Centre.

== Early life and education ==
Matthew Pegg was born in Keswick, Ontario in 1973 and grew up on his family farm.

He has completed university education in Leadership and Administration from Dalhousie University, Industrial Relations from Queen's University and Public Management from the Schulich School of Business at York University.

He has been awarded the Executive Chief Fire Officer professional designation by the Canadian Association of Fire Chiefs.

== Career ==
While working as a mechanic, Pegg joined the Georgina Fire Department as a volunteer firefighter in 1992 before continuing as a full-time firefighter in 1994. He was promoted to Deputy Fire Chief in 2001.

Pegg served as Deputy Fire Chief for the town of Ajax, ON from 2002 to 2008 before serving as the City of Brampton's Deputy Fire Chief until 2013.

He joined Toronto Fire Services as Deputy Fire Chief and Director of Administrative Services in 2013 before being appointed as interim Fire Chief following the retirement of Jim Sales in May 2016.

Toronto's City Council appointed Pegg as permanent Fire Chief in April 2017 following a “North America-wide recruitment search”.

He was the President of the Ontario Association of Fire Chiefs from May 2013 through May 2016.

Pegg is a licensed Commercial Pilot and worked as a part-time Corporate pilot, on a part-time basis, from 2000–2006.

Pegg led fire services through the six-alarm Toronto Badminton and Racquet Club fire in February 2017, the six-alarm Cherry Street recycling fire in May 2017.

Pegg and his team developed and implemented the new Operations-Based Fire Code Reinspection Program and the Toronto Fire Services Transformation Plan in 2017.

During Pegg's tenure, Toronto Fire Services achieved International Accreditation through the Commission on Fire Accreditation International (CFAI) in 2019. This made Toronto the largest city with an accredited fire service in North America.

In March 2020, Chief Pegg was appointed as the incident commander of the City of Toronto's COVID-19 incident management system. In this role, he led the City of Toronto's response to the COVID-19 pandemic, working with the city's Mayor John Tory and its Medical Officer of Health Dr Eileen de Villa. Chief Pegg led all aspects of the city's planning and response to COVID-19, led the COVID-19 Strategic Command Team and the Immunization Task Force.

COVID-19 is the first and only declared emergency in the City of Toronto.

== Honors and awards ==
- Ontario Fire Service Long Service Medal – 2017
- Fire Services Exemplary Service Medal – 2012
- Ontario Medal for Firefighters Bravery – 1996
- John C. Maxwell Transformational Leadership Award Top 30 Finalist – 2018]

== Publications ==
- "Taking the Lead" – February 2020
- "Social Media Followers Don't Make a Leader" – November 2019
- "When I Was" – August 2019
- "Being a Leader is not a Spectator Sport" – May 2019
- "Maximum Thrust" – February 2019
- “Reputation Management” - November 2018
- “Inner Circles” - September 2018
- “Top 5 Ways to Ruin Your Career” - February 2018
- “Steps to Solving Your Personal Problems” - November 2017
- “Aim for Influence Over Rank” - August 2017
- “Finding Leadership Between the Lines” - May 2017
- “Boldly Going Outside Your Comfort Zone” - March 2017
- “Preparing for Promotion” - December 2016
- “Seize Opportunities for Career Success” - November 2016
