= Mighty Machines =

Canadian television series

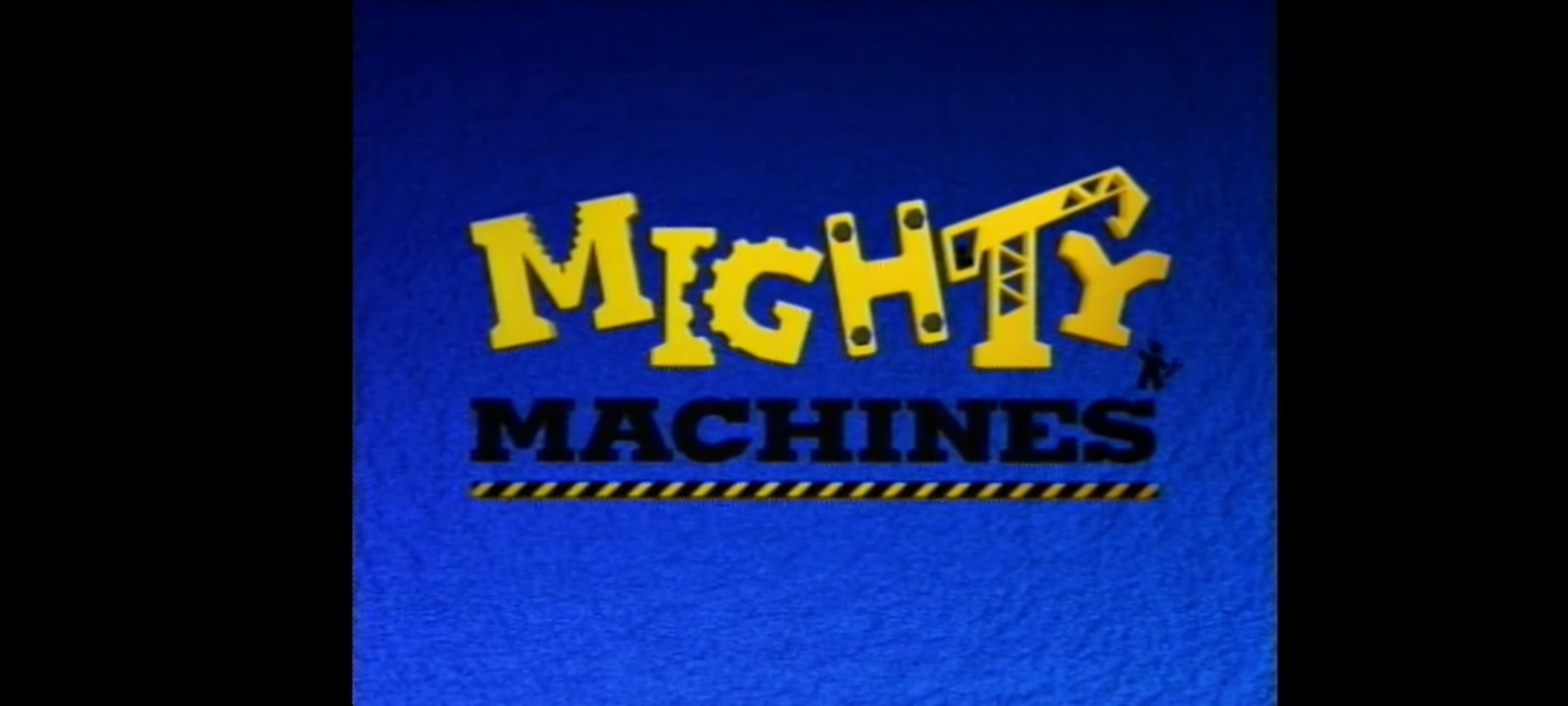
- Genre: Educational children's television series
- Opening theme: "Mighty Machines" by Marvin Dolgay and Glenn Morley
- Country of origin: Canada
- No. of episodes: 39

Production
- Running time: 23 minutes
- Production companies: Mighty Machines Productions; TVOKids

Original release
- Network: Family Channel (Season 1); TVOntario (English, Seasons 2-3); TFO (French, Seasons 2-3); Knowledge Network (English, Seasons 2-3); Access (Season 3); SCN (Season 3); Qubo (United States)
- Release: October 1994 – 2008

Mighty Machines is a Canadian educational children's television series. The series is about how machines work and what they do. The show premiered in October 1994 on Family Channel. 39 episodes over three seasons were produced.

== Format ==
Each Mighty Machines episode focuses on a specific type of heavy equipment or work environment. The machines talk to the viewers. Documentary footage of actual machines in action doing their day-to-day work is presented with voiceovers of the machines addressing the viewers. The audience is invited to follow the machines during a typical day. The machines explain their abilities and duties in detail over the course of the episode. The machines talk to each other too. Each machine is given its own personality and they often have conversations with each other as they work. Unlike most documentary-style shows, there is no external narrator.

All Season 1 episodes were done in two formats for the airing: 22-minute episodes and five-minute excerpts for use as filler.

== Production ==
The first season of Mighty Machines aired as a production of Malofilm in 1994-1995. The second and third seasons, which aired in 2004 and 2008, respectively, were done by Loten Media and distributed by Seville Pictures. Most of the episodes were filmed in Toronto, Ontario while others were filmed in Montreal, Quebec. Three episodes were filmed in the United States.

== List of episodes ==
=== Season 1 (1994-1995) – Malofilm / Seville Pictures ===
The first six episodes of season 1 were written by Doug Atkinson and Fiona Zippan (Denzey) while the remaining episodes were written by Bryan A. Auld. Credited voice actors of season 1 are Loredana Cunti, Tim Brown, Jennifer Martin, Noah Segal, Joel Cohen, Greg Blanchard, Gord Rutherford, Claire Rothman, Arthur Holden, John Metcalfe, and Steve Murphy.

1. At the Airport

At Toronto Pearson International Airport, DC, a Canadian Airlines DC-10 jet (Noah Segal), explains (and shows) his journey from the hangar to the terminal, before picking up passengers and taking off. He also shows the viewers how he gets inspected in the hangar. Many other aircraft are featured in the episode including a Canadian Airlines Boeing 737 (misnamed as an A320) (Jennifer Martin) who carries a talking suitcase named Sammy,(Gord Rutherford) a British Airways, Air Canada, and Lufthansa Boeing 747, an American Airlines Boeing 757 and a few others. An airport tug named Tug (Greg Blanchard) also explains his job. This episode is the series premiere.

2. At the Quarry

Euclid, a Euclid R170 quarry dump truck (Noah Segal) shows how he and his brother Ernie, also a Euclid R170 quarry dump truck are loaded with rocks by LeTourneau, a LeTourneau L-1100 front end loader and bring the rocks from the quarry to a rock crusher, turning them into gravel. A gravel conveyor brings the gravel to a gravel pit where an unnamed Volvo BM L180 front-end loader loads the gravel into trucks that deliver the gravel to where it's needed. Also included is a magical boulder named Roxy, who makes the pile of gravel.

3. In the City

Little Mac, a small municipal first-generation Chevrolet S-10 pickup truck, from the City of Toronto, shows viewers how the city streets are cleaned. The featured machines that do this include Dusty, an FMC Vanguard 3000 street sweeper who sweeps the roads, Vacuum Vic, a Navistar International S2500 vacuum truck who cleans out sewers, Gusher, a Ford CT8000 street sprinkler semi-truck who sprays water on the roads. Other machines doing work around the city include Stumper, a mobile chainsaw who obliterates stumps, and a Ford F-Series boom truck named Stretch with a shredder named Chipper, who trims trees. At the yard, Jaws, a Case W20C front-end loader picks up the street garbage to load into The Dump Truck Brothers to take to the dump. The main location is the public works city garage.

4. In the Harbour

Murphy, a Toronto Police boat, takes viewers out into Toronto Harbour to show many of his harbour friends, including Blackie and Thor, two large freighters; William Lyon Mackenzie, a fireboat; and Flo and Merryweather, a couple of ferry boats Oriole, a Toronto city tours boat; a working replica of a square rigger ship and the two ferries that go to Toronto Island, all of which explain their use of operating in the harbour. Cranes named Hook and Claw play a role in unloading ships. Murphy speaks with an Irish accent.

5. At the Construction Site

Big Cat, a Koehring excavator shows viewers how he and his friends help build a hospital from digging the foundation to building the walls. Big Cat’s job is digging the foundations. Other members of the construction company include Skinny, a mobile crane who helps build concrete walls by dumping concrete into molds using a concrete hopper, Treads, a bulldozer, Charlie, a concrete mixer truck who brings concrete to the construction site, Mallory, a forklift who moves construction materials around the construction site and works with Lurch, another mobile crane who unloads construction materials off trucks and also brings the construction materials to where they're needed, George, a semi-dump truck who brings sand to the construction, Boomer, another mobile crane who helps set up wall molds for Skinny to dump concrete into, and Putt Putt, a mini dumper who helps build concrete floors. Meanwhile, in Downtown Toronto two tower cranes named SkyHook and Carmen help build a skyscraper that is almost finished (the same skyscraper in "At The Cement Yard"). The building under construction in Downtown Toronto is the Princess Margaret Cancer Centre, it was built as an extension to The Campbell Family Building which became part of the Princess Margaret Cancer Centre and was completed in 1995. The glass skyscraper SkyHook mentions is located at 777 Bay Street and was built in 1980.

6. At the Race Track

Two versions of this episode were made. The second version replaced the first version in circulation because the alcohol and tobacco company sponsors in the episode were deemed inappropriate to be seen by the show's target audience.

First Version

Blue, a Reynard 94I race car (driven by Jacques Villeneuve) shows viewers how race cars are transported to races, how race cars are prepared before a race, qualifying, racing, and making pit stops. The race in this version took place during the 1994 Molson Indy Toronto at Exhibition Place in Toronto, Ontario on July 17, 1994. Emerson Fittipaldi was shown to have supposedly won the race but in reality Michael Andretti won the race.

Footage of Alessandro Zampedri in his number 19 Mi-Jack Lola T93/00 race car during the 1994 Molson Indy Toronto was used for the show's intro.

Second Version

Yellow, a Vector Zetec Formula Ford race car (driven by Martin Guimont), and GoldStar, a Van Diemen RF91 Formula Ford race car (driven by Martin Roy) show viewers how race cars are transported to races, how race cars are prepared before a race, qualifying, racing against other racers, and making pit stops. The race in this version took place during the Esso Protec BFGoodrich Formula 1600 Series at Circuit Mont-Tremblant in Mont-Tremblant, Quebec on September 24, 1995. Alex Tagliani was shown to have supposedly won the race but in reality, he finished the race in 5th place with a penalty while Andrew Bordin won the race, whether the shot of Alex Tagliani driving around the race track in his race car while holding a checkered flag near the end of the episode is from this race or a different race is unknown. GoldStar is voiced by Arthur Holden.

7. At the Demolition Site

Dino, a Caterpillar 245 hydraulic shear excavator shows viewers around a demolition site and how he demolishes an old factory building with his shears. Crane, a stationary truck crane lifts out pipes and a motor from the building. Dozer, a Caterpillar 973 tracked loader smooths the roads in the demolition site. Dynamite is used to collapse two water towers and a tall concrete chimney. Big Mack arrives to pick up the scrap metal from the demolition site. Grapple, a Komatsu hydraulic claw excavator loads scrap metal into Mack. This episode was filmed at the former St. Lawrence Starch Company factory in Port Credit, Mississauga which was located at Hurontario Street and Lakeshore Road East. The factory permanently closed on March 31, 1990. The demolition was done by Teperman and took approximately 8 months to complete, the demolition was completed in June 1994, the administration building was preserved and is now used as the head office for building and real estate group FRAM + Slokker who redeveloped the area into a residential area starting in 1999 and completed in 2011. It's unknown if there is any truth to Dino's claim that the area was supposed to be redeveloped into a "great big park for kids". A portion of this episode was filmed on June 19, 1994. Some of the footage used for the episode is not in chronological order, the tall concrete chimney can be seen already demolished in some shots despite the demolition segment of it having not been shown yet.

8. At the Train Yard

Two Canadian Pacific SW1200RS switchers and a Canadian National GP38-2 road switcher named Shunty, Diesel, and Freddie explain how work goes on in the train yard, including switching, putting the cars on the right train and transporting materials long distances. Spike and his tie gang maintain the rails to keep them safe for the trains to run on.

9. At the Fire Hall

King, a Mack / King Snorkel truck from the North York Fire Department shows viewers how his aerial platform works, while Pumper, a Spartan pumper truck, also from the North York Fire Department, shows how the hoses work. Sparky, a fire hydrant supervises them and delivers water for their training exercise. This was before North York merged into Toronto in 1998.

10. On the Road

Big Hoss, a Peterbilt 379 semi-truck shows viewers how he gets hooked up to a refrigerated trailer, then he takes viewers out on the road as he travels to a Husky truck stop to get his fuel tanks filled up, deliver empty pallets, and pick up a load of carrots. Forky, a forklift unloads the empty pallets from Big Hoss's trailer. Little Joe, a forklift loads carrots into Big Hoss's trailer. Big Hoss speaks with a Texan accent. This episode was filmed in the Greater Toronto Area mainly in Bradford, Ontario.

11. At the Garbage Dump

A garbage truck named Trasher explains his job, collecting garbage in neighbourhoods with Mario, his driver. Later, Whitey, another garbage truck, explains the operations of the transfer station, showing how garbage is pushed down a chute and compacted into large semi-trailers used for garbage transfer. The trailer of garbage is then picked up by Big Red, a garbage transfer truck. The story continues at the dump where Big Red, a semi-garbage truck introduces the machines that work at the dump; Pee-Wee, a bulldozer, Spike, a compactor, and Scoop, a scraper explain how a landfill works. Scoop and Pee-Wee spread the garbage out after the garbage trucks unload it. Pee-Wee spreads out the garbage while Spike compacts it, Scoop brings dirt to the dump to cover up the garbage, and Pee-Wee finishes it by spreading the dirt out. This episode was filmed at the Disco Transfer Station in Etobicoke and the Keele Valley landfill in Vaughan.

12. At the Cement Yard

Big Boy, a cement mixer truck, shows viewers how concrete is made and what it is used for. The cement yard receives a load of sand from Red, a Mack hopper semi-truck, and a load of gravel from Blue, a Western Star hopper semi-truck who dump their loads into grates, the gravel is taken by a conveyor belt and the different sizes of gravel are sorted into piles. Sally, a Caterpillar front-end loader, keeps the gravel piles in the yard tidy. Big Boy is loaded with concrete and takes his load to replace a road while Tiny, also a cement mixer, takes his load of concrete to a skyscraper under construction (the same skyscraper in "At The Construction Site", the Princess Margaret Cancer Centre).

=== Season 2 (2004) – Seville Pictures ===
Episodes of this season were written by Bill Freeman. Credited voice actors for season 2 are Edward Daranyi, Santo Lupo, Christopher Quinn, Patte Rosebank, Tanya Schneider, Chuck Vollmar, Alan Bacchus, Suzanne Hersh, Oliver Svendsen, and Hannah Cheesman.

13. In the Snowstorm

Buzz, Stretch, and Ranger, a snow removal crew in Montreal, go out to clear the streets after a big snowstorm. The different tasks involved in this process are detailed by Blower, a snowblower machine, Bobcat, a Bobcat loader, Casey, a backhoe loader, Grader, a motor grader and Big Dude, a snowplow.

14. Deep Underground

Ranger, Scoop, Cutter, Driller, Scaler, and Crusher, machines operating in a salt mine, explain how to find the salt, scoop it up, and carry it to the surface of the mine. Ranger, a jeep inspects while Driller pokes holes for explosives, Cutter digs the opening of the mine, Scoop, a front loader picks up the rocks, Scaler, a wheeled continuous mining excavator with a wall scraper scrapes off all of the salt. Loader then dumps it into Dumper. After all the salt has been dug up, it gets loaded on a conveyor belt into a cargo ship named Selene to be taken to the public works to be used for icy roads. This was filmed in Goderich Harbour, Ontario at the Sifto Canada salt mine on Lake Huron.

15. At the Ski Hill

Groomer, a snow groomer, explains how he grooms snow at night while the ski hill is closed. A gondola lift and chairlift also explain their jobs. This episode was filmed in Mont-Tremblant.

16. In the Sky!

A blue and yellow biplane named Stearman visits an airshow. All helicopters report on what goes on at the airshow. Old-fashioned and modern-day airplanes appear. This episode was filmed at the Sun 'n Fun airshow in Lakeland, Florida and is one of three episodes filmed outside Canada.

17. In the Forest

Feller, a Feller Buncher machine, explains how he cuts only marked trees in the forest. Skidders then explain how they skid logs to the log loader, which demonstrates its agility between loading logging trucks.

18. At the Sawmill

At a busy sawmill, Jaws, a front-end loader, explains how the trees are turned into lumber and what he does with the cut logs. His friends Cat, Grapple, Buzz, Scoop, and Big Red are many of the other machines that explain how the lumber will soon be turned into wood. Chip truck comes to collect all the chips to be made into paper.

19. All About Recycling

An unnamed recycling truck explains how he collects recyclables in neighbourhoods and sends it through many other machines, so it can be reused again. Big Blue, the sorting machine, shows how all the recycling is compacted. Kurt, a skid steer shovels it up. You also get to see how metal is recycled in a junkyard, and how asphalt to make a road can be recycled too. At the junkyard, the operations are explained by Grapple, a grapple truck, at the road repair site, Chewy, a pavement profiler, a mixer-paver, and Roller, an asphalt roller work together. The episode was filmed in Toronto, Ontario, Scarborough, Ontario, and Burlington, Ontario at Cascades Recovery Plus (45 Thornmount Drive) in Scarborough and Dominion Nickel Alloys Ltd. (834 Appleby Line) in Burlington, Ontario.

20. Building a Truck!

A number of machines explain and show how much work it takes to build a truck. The episode is hosted by an unnamed tractor unit who was built in the factory. This episode was filmed at the Navistar International plant Chatham. The plant was closed and demolished in 2011.

21. Making Waves!

Skipper takes viewers into Halifax Harbour, and while meeting many ferries, cargo ships, navy ships and one cruise ship “Voyager of the Seas”, he shows how waves were formed.

22. Making a Road

Sammy, an excavator, explains how a new road is built and prepared for vehicles to drive over. Tommy, an articulated dump truck dumps the dirt. Bulldozers, scrapers, and soil compactors help out with the foundations, then the asphalt crew lays down the road. Dozer, a bulldozer, and the scrapers level the ground, then Packer, and Rolland, two soil compactors flatten the ground. Roxy and Mack, two gravel dump trucks dump piles of gravel, Rocky, another bulldozer levels down the gravel, with help from Gary, a grader, and Biggest Heaviest Roller. There is also footage down at an Asphalt plant, where Lea, a front loader dumps crushed stones into a chute to make the asphalt. Jock, a dump truck brings the asphalt to the site, Lenny, a Paver, and Rod, a roller flatten it all down.

23. On the Farm

Allis a tractor explains how he must pull Polly, a plowing machine, to keep the fields ready for farming.

24. To the Rescue!

Sambraro, a coast guard lifeboat, and a rescue lifeboat explains how they recover a man overboard from stormy seas. Hercules, a fireboat is his Lieutenant.

25. Trucks, Trucks, Trucks!

Vehicles include a gas truck, a carnival truck, and a cement pumper truck Filmed at Flying J London.

26. Buses, Subways, and Trains!

Various public transport vehicles are featured in this episode, including Buddy, an OC Transpo bus, Humber and Neville, two streetcars, an O-Train, a GO Train and a Toronto subway train, who in turn explain their jobs of picking up the passengers and dropping them off exactly where they want to be.

=== Season 3 (2008) – Loten Media / Seville Pictures ===
Credited voice actors for season 3 are Chris Quinn, Kim Godfrey, Shawn Colin, Todd Schick, Dave Crichton, Blair Bailey, Nick Tracey, Colin Kirley, Suzanne Hersh, Wesley Cudlip, Bill Freeman, Derek Pert, Joe Pillitteri, and Chandra Wohleber.

27. Building an Airplane

JetGirl, a Bombardier Challenger 300, visits Montréal–Trudeau International Airport and explains and shows how she was made in the nearby Bombardier plant to the viewers.

28. Ride the Mountain Rails

On the White Pass and Yukon Route, diesel locomotive 95 pulls a maintenance of way train while three other locomotives pull a tourist train. This is one of three episodes filmed outside Canada. It was filmed in Skagway, Alaska, White Pass, and Carcross, Yukon.

29. Car Wreckers

Forks, a forklift shows children what he does in the car scrap yard. This episode was filmed in Ontario notably in Guelph.

30. Laying Down the Pipeline

Excavator, an excavator, shows how he digs deep in the ground for pipelines that are to be installed. His friends show how pipelines are connected and installed into the ground.

31. At the Steel Mill

Slab haulers and other machines show how steel is made. The cast includes a Slab Hauler named Stevie and his friend Sami, also a Slab Hauler. Benny, a Bulldozer piles up fresh coal in the yard near the building, Scott, a Scraper scoops up the coal and dumps it from his bin into the chute to be made into coke. Electro, a magnetic crane picks up the steel and loads them onto freight cars. Pusher and Quencher work inside the steel mill plant and a switcher locomotive moves freight cars around. This episode was filmed at ArcelorMittal Dofasco in Hamilton, Ontario.

32. Hot Off the Press

Charlie, a printing press, and other printing machines show how the Toronto Star newspaper is made. The other machines include Stuffer, who inserts 'supplements', like brochures and coupons into newspapers, Bundler, who packs up the newspapers, and the machines which print onto metal sheets the design of a page so it can be transferred onto newsprint.

33. Giant Tow Trucks

TT, a tow truck shows viewers all of the gear he carries to different jobs, and with the help of another tow truck they pull a tanker that has tipped over.

34. Bringing in the Harvest

Harvesters harvest tomatoes and grapes from farms, which are loaded onto trailers pulled by tractors. The fruit is later taken to factories; tomatoes to be made into different varieties like ketchup or tomato soup (according to one of the machines), the grapes being made into wine.

35. Reach for the Sky!

Stretch, a mobile crane, replaces a large air conditioner on the top of a tall building, with help from another crane, Little Brother. Stretch is ready to make the big lift while "Gypsy" Lady a Sikorsky S-64 Skycrane lifts an AC unit to the roof of a factory.

36. Machines Go to School

Backhoes, bulldozers, and other machines go to school to learn about how to dig, push, and carry dirt. They also learn other construction procedures. This episode was filmed in Morrisburg, Ontario.

37. Go, Boats, Go!

Features Penac, a Canadian Coast Guard hovercraft, Fast-Forward, a Floridian airboat, and the Empress of the North, a paddle-wheeler. This is one of three episodes filmed outside Canada; Fast-Forward's segment takes place in the Floridian Everglades.

38. Under the Waves

Atlantis, a tour submarine, shows his passengers the Coral Reef, Newtsub, a submersible, searches for and finds a diving helmet underwater, and HMCS Corner Brook, a Navy submarine, shows the audience his features.

39. Board the Ferry

The Spirit of Vancouver Island, a BCFerries ferry, shows the audience what happens at the dock, the controls of the ship, and other things on the ship. This episode was mostly filmed in portions of Vancouver Island and is the series finale.

== Telecast and home media ==
The show aired on Family Channel, TVOKids, Treehouse TV and other channels in Canada, including Access in Alberta, the Saskatchewan Communications Network in Saskatchewan, and Knowledge in British Columbia. It also aired on Discovery Kids in the United Kingdom in 2005, on the now-defunct Qubo in the United States until August 31, 2014, and a French-language version airs on TFO in Ontario and on channels in Quebec.

Some of the episodes from season 1 were put on direct-to-video tapes released by the Disney-owned Buena Vista Home Video as well as Anchor Bay Entertainment in the U.S.

All episodes are available on VHS and DVD, individually or in box sets. There is also a 60-minute VHS featuring all of the five-minute episodes from seasons 1 and 2, which was later released on DVD in six volumes as "The Best of Mighty Machines".

=== DVD releases ===
- Chomp! Crunch! Tear! features "Car Wreckers", "Giant Tow Trucks", and "Laying Down the Pipeline"
- Tremendous Tools features "On the Farm", "At the Sawmill", and "Deep Underground"
- Winter Blast features "In the Snowstorm", "At the Ski Hill", and "In the Forest"
- Revvved Up! features "Building an Airplane", "Ride the Mountain Rails", and "Reach for the Sky!"
- Diggers and Dozers features "At the Construction Site", "At the Demolition Site", and "At the Quarry"
- Machines on the Job features "Bringing in the Harvest", "At the Steel Mill", and "Hot off the Press"
- Big Wheels Rollin features "At the Cement Yard", "Building a Truck", and "Trucks, Trucks, Trucks!"
- Lights and Ladders features "At the Fire Hall", "At the Garbage Dump", and "In the City"
- Roadways to Runways features "At the Race Track", "At the Airport", and "On the Road"
- Boats to the Rescue features "To the Rescue!", "Making Waves!", and "In the Harbour"
- All About Garbage and Recycling features "All About Recycling" and "At the Garbage Dump"
- Making Tracks features "At the Train Yard", "Making a Road", and "Buses, Subways, and Trains!"
- Mega Machines features "Go, Boats, Go!", "Machines Go to School", "Under the Waves", "Board the Ferry", and "All About Recycling"
- Learning, Lifting, and Towing features "Machines Go to School", "Reach for the Sky!", and "Giant Tow Trucks"
- Planes, Trains, & Automobiles features "Building an Airplane", "Ride the Mountain Rails", and "Car Wreckers"
- Ships Ahoy! features "Under the Waves", "Go, Boats, Go!", and "Board the Ferry"
- Machines on the Job features "Bringing in the Harvest", "At the Steel Mill", and "Hot Off the Press"
- Producing the Goods features "Bringing in the Harvest", "At the Steel Mill", "Hot Off the Press", and "Laying Down the Pipeline"
- Smash, Mash, and Crash features 14 mini episodes.
- The Best of Mighty Machines Volumes 1-6 features different 5-minute versions of episodes from seasons 1 and 2.

== Honours ==
Mighty Machines was nominated for a Gemini Award in 1996 in the category of "Best Children's Program or Series".
