= William Thornton (firefighter) =

Canadian firefighter (1826–1848)

- Born: 1826
- Died: 1848 (aged 21–22); Toronto, Canada West, Province of Canada
- Occupations: Teamster, volunteer firefighter
- Known for: First firefighter to die in the line of duty in what is now Ontario

William Thornton (1826–1848) was a Canadian firefighter. He was the first firefighter in Toronto to die in the line of duty. He was mortally wounded by a falling wall on November 22, 1848, suffering a severely fractured skull and other injuries. He died of his injuries two days later.

Thornton, only 22 at the time of his death, was a volunteer with No. 1 Hook and Ladder Company, as were all his fellow firefighters, with the exception of the Chief Engineer. He worked as a teamster, and supported his mother and two sisters. In a profile of Thornton, in the Torontoist, Kevin Plummer remarked that "Little is known of Thornton.". He described how former firefighter Robert Kirkpatrick, author of Their Last Alarm, a book about firefighters who lost their lives in the line of duty in Ontario, was shocked to learn that Thornton had been buried in an unmarked grave. Kirkpatrick researched the approximate location of Thornton's grave and firefighters dedicated a monument to him in 2003.

Thornton was inside a burning office building near the southeast corner of Church and King streets, where he was hit by falling masonry. Plummer noted that Thornton was brought to the fire hall for treatment by Dr. Walter Telfer, who cleaned his wounds and treated him with a phlebotomy—bleeding. Plummer reported that, according to The Globe and Mail [sic] "About two inches square of the skull was driven into the brain,". After his phlebotomy Telfer "sent him home to recuperate."

In June 2015 a recommendation was made to Toronto City Council that when Toronto Fire Services replaced the Sora with another former Canadian Coast Guard vessel, the Cape Hurd, as its second string fireboat, she should be christened the William Thornton in remembrance of him.
