= CCGS CG 119 =

History

Canada
- Name: 119
- Operator: Canadian Coast Guard
- Builder: Eastern Equipment Ltd., Montreal
- Launched: 1972
- Completed: 1972
- Commissioned: 1972
- In service: 1972–present
- Status: in active service

General characteristics
- Type: Specialty Vessel – patrol
- Displacement: 21 grt
- Length: 13.45 m (44 ft 2 in)
- Beam: 3.65 m (12 ft 0 in)
- Draft: 0.98 m (3 ft 3 in)
- Propulsion: 2 Detroit Series 53 diesel engines
- Endurance: 1 day
- Complement: 3

CCGS CG 119 is a patrol vessel of the Canadian Coast Guard. The ship is a converted self-righting lifeboat similar to the Waveney-class lifeboat.
