= Nellie Bly (fireboat) =

Steam Tugboat

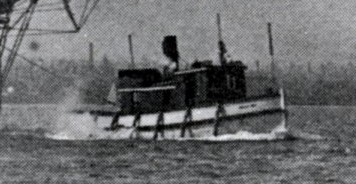
The Nellie Bly during her operation in Toronto, Ontario, Canada.

Nellie Bly was a steam-powered tugboat that served a number of roles in Ontario, Canada.

She was operated in Toronto, performing regular harbour duties, and also serving as a fireboat. She played a role in fighting an important fire in 1906.

Later she was owned by a series of timber companies, that used her to tow logs and scows of logging byproducts on the Magnetawan River and its tributaries. She ran aground and was holed on a rock on Duck Lake, but was quickly repaired.

The Nellie Bly was 52 feet (16 m) long, and her single cylinder steam engine propelled her with a 5 feet (1.5 m) propeller.

== Service History ==
Nellie Bly initially operated in Toronto, Ontario, performing a range of harbour duties that included towing barges, assisting larger commercial vessels, and transporting equipment and personnel for municipal operations. As part of the city’s auxiliary fleet, she contributed to the maintenance and functioning of the waterfront, supporting daily navigation and logistical tasks. In addition to her routine work, she was occasionally deployed in emergency situations, notably as a fireboat. Although not designed primarily for firefighting, she was equipped with a deck-mounted pump capable of delivering water to shore crews and other vessels. Her most significant documented firefighting role occurred during the 1906 Toronto waterfront fire, when she helped contain the spread of flames among warehouses and piers, demonstrating her versatility as a support vessel in urban maritime operations.

After her service in Toronto, Nellie Bly was acquired by timber companies operating on the Magnetawan River and its tributaries in northern Ontario. In this environment, she was primarily used for towing log booms, transporting scows carrying sawmill byproducts, and assisting with seasonal log drives. Her size, shallow draft, and steam propulsion made her well suited to navigate narrow river channels, shallow lakes, and the often challenging conditions of the region’s waterways. During her logging operations, she ran aground on a rock formation in Duck Lake, sustaining hull damage. The vessel was repaired locally and returned to service, continuing her duties along the river system.

Throughout her career in the logging industry, Nellie Bly served as an essential utility vessel, providing reliable transport and support in both commercial and industrial contexts. She remained active until the late 1920s and early 1930s, when the decline of steam-powered tugs and the reduction of river-based timber transport gradually limited her operational role. While specific records of her final disposition are scarce, it is understood that she was eventually retired as newer technologies and changing industry practices rendered her design obsolete.
