= Toronto Fire Services =

Fire service of Toronto, Ontario, Canada

Agency overview
- Established: 1874 (as Toronto Fire Department), 1998 (as Toronto Fire Services)
- Annual calls: 469,056 (2023)
- Employees: 3,258 (2023)
- Annual budget: C$524.440 million (2019)
- Staffing: Career
- Fire chief: Jim Jessop
- EMS level: First Responder
- Motto: "Courage, Compassion, Service"

Facilities and equipment
- Stations: 84
- Engines: 86
- Trucks: 6
- Quints: 26
- Squads: 5
- Tenders: 2
- HAZMAT: 4
- Fireboats: 2

Website
- www.toronto.ca/fire-services

Toronto Fire Services (TFS), commonly called Toronto Fire, provides fire protection, technical rescue services, hazardous materials response, and first responder emergency medical assistance in Toronto, Ontario. TFS is currently the largest municipal fire department in Canada.

== History ==
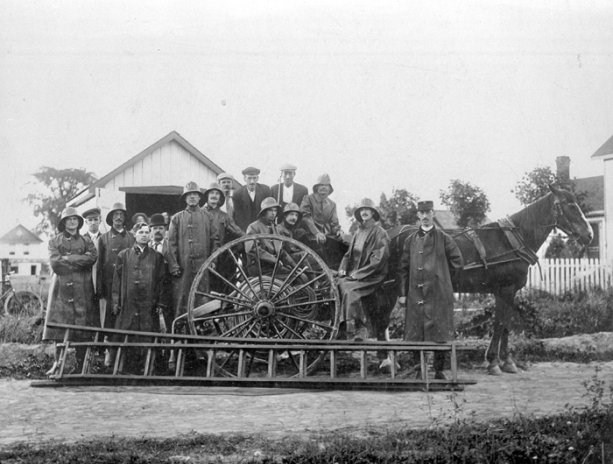
The Bedford Park Volunteer Fire Brigade, c. 1900.

The first fire company in what is now Toronto was the York Fire Company created in 1826, followed by the Hook and Ladder Fire Company in 1831. These early companies consisted of able-bodied volunteers that were not well trained. A wooden pumper presented to Toronto by the British America Assurance Company c. 1837 has been preserved at Black Creek Pioneer Village.

The city's vulnerability to fire was highlighted by the Great Toronto Fire of 1849 and that of 1904. After the latter fire, which destroyed much of Bay Street from The Esplanade West to Melinda Street, Toronto's Fire Department was recognized as a critical city service.

With the amalgamation of Toronto, the fire departments of Metropolitan Toronto's six constituent municipalities were merged in 1998 to form Toronto Fire Services, the largest fire department in Canada and the fifth-largest municipal fire department in North America.

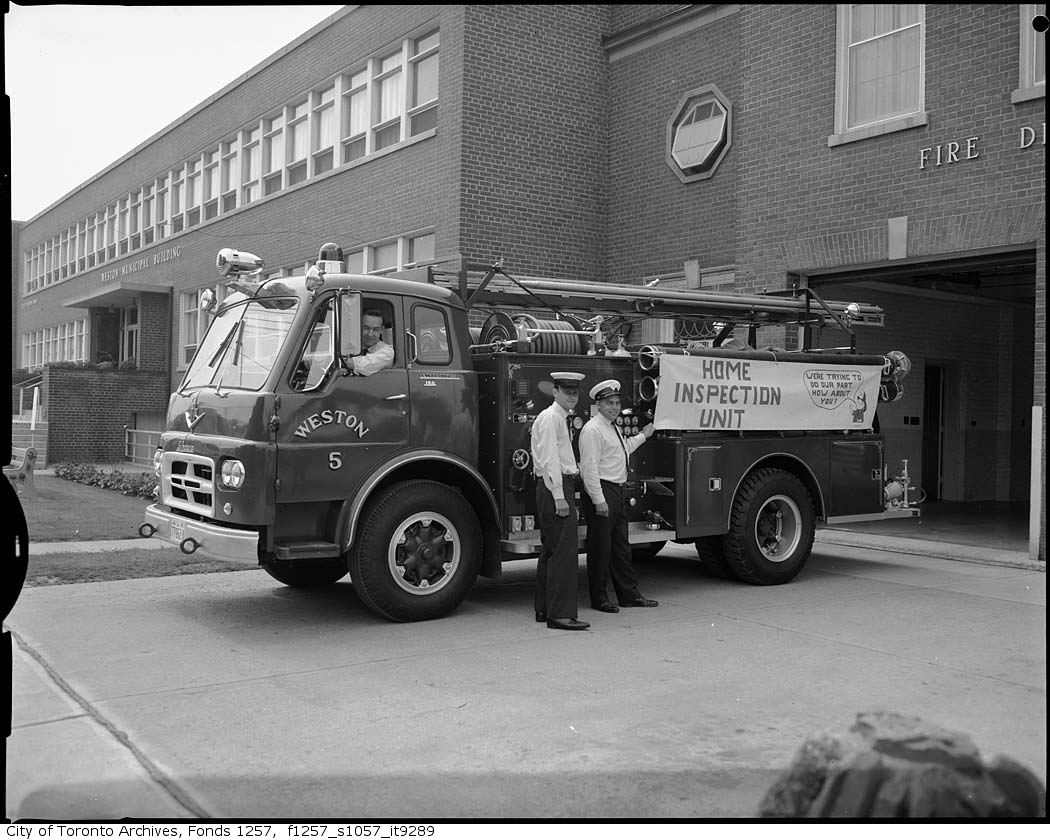
The Weston Fire Department, c. 1964.

In the 2010s, Station 424 and four pumper trucks were taken out of service and Fire District 12 was disbanded, due to budgetary constraints and obsolescence. A new plan was introduced seeing to inclusion in staffing, a permanent safety task force for the needs of Toronto Community Housing, and a new station was opened in Downsview Park.

TFS holds accreditation from the Commission on Fire Accreditation International (CFAI) and the Center for Public Safety Excellence, recognizing the organization's delivery of "world-class fire protection services". As of 2024, Toronto was the largest city in North America to receive international fire service accreditation.

=== Predecessor organizations ===
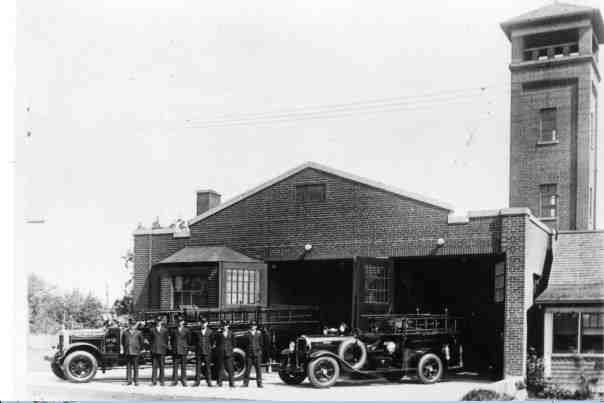
A fire hall on Birchmount Road, which was used by the Scarborough Fire Department until its amalgamation with other Metro Toronto fire services.

==== Former borough departments ====
- North York Fire Department, est. 1923 – merged seven volunteer brigades
- Scarborough Fire Department, est. 1925 – replaced five volunteer bucket brigades dating to the 1850s
- New Toronto Fire Department, est. 1930
- Township of Etobicoke Fire Department, est. 1955, merged with New Toronto Fire Department 1967

== Organization ==
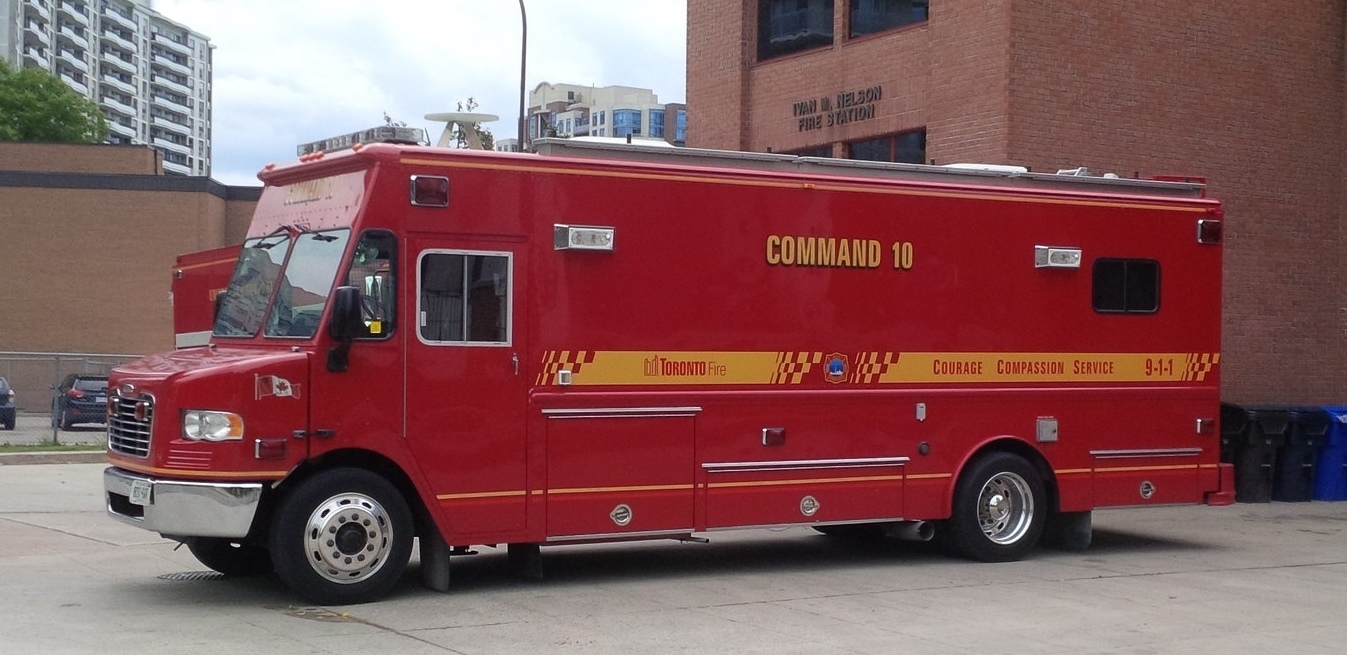
A command vehicle used by Toronto Fire leadership to coordinate activity on the scene of a large incident.

The fire chief (Chief Jim Jessop) as well as the four commanding deputy chiefs (Paul Fitzgerald, Steven Darling, Therese Chen, Steven Wilson) are all based at 4330 Dufferin Street, which is the central headquarters for both Toronto Fire and Toronto Paramedic Services. There are four division commanders (Paul O’Brien, Robert Hewson, John Carson and John Davidson), each based in their respective commands: north, east, south and west.

=== List of chiefs ===
Toronto Fire Services chiefs have been promoted from within the service's ranks – with the exception of Jim Sales, who was Edmonton's fire chief (1988–2000) and Markham fire chief (2000–2001) before serving as a bureaucrat and general manager of the City of Barrie.

- Alan F. Speed: 1997–2003
- William A. Stewart: 2003–2012
- Jim W. Sales: 2012–2016
- Matthew Pegg: 2016–2024
- Jim Jessop: 2024–present

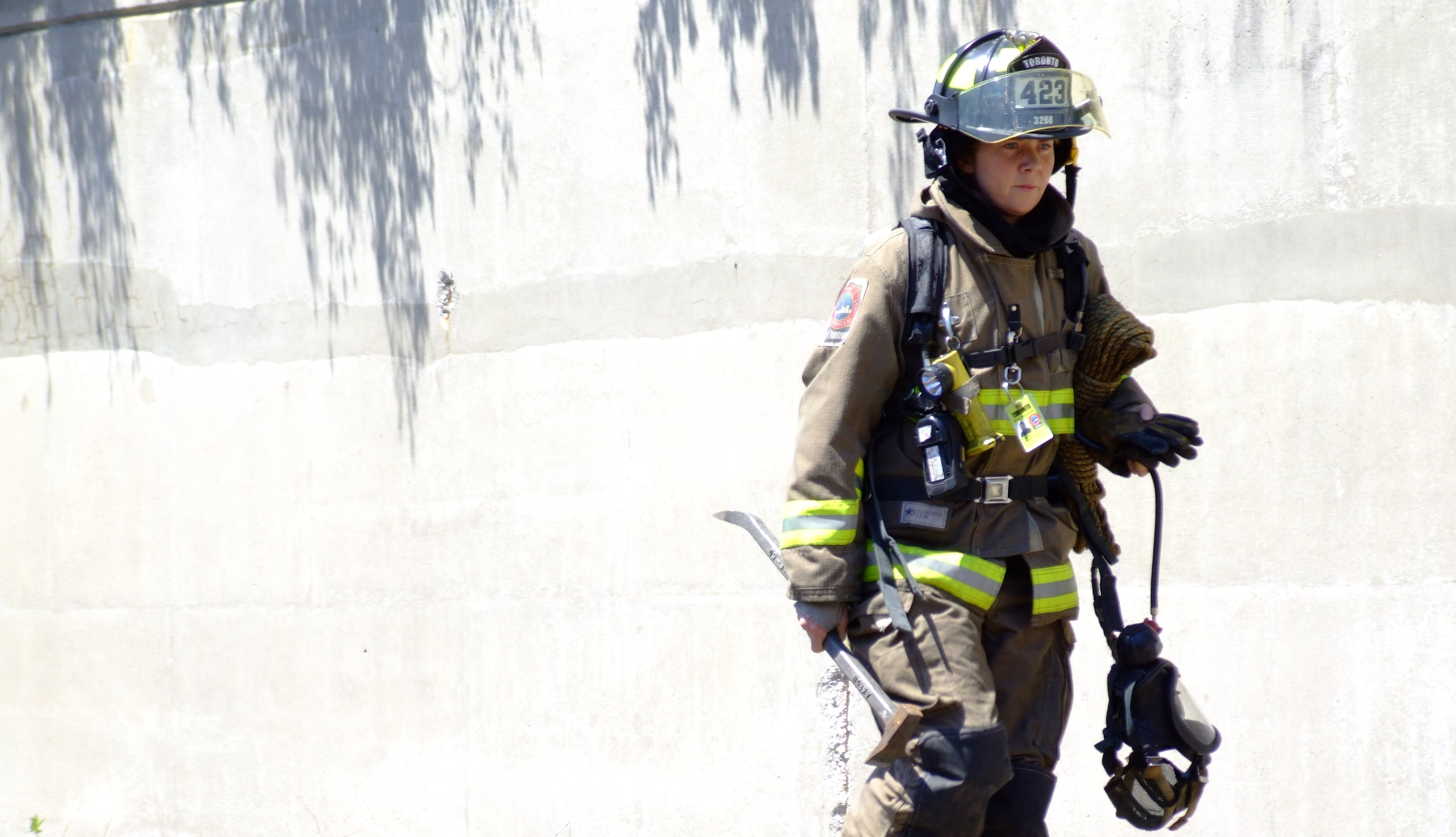
A firefighter from the Toronto Fire Services in firefighting gear

=== Vehicles ===
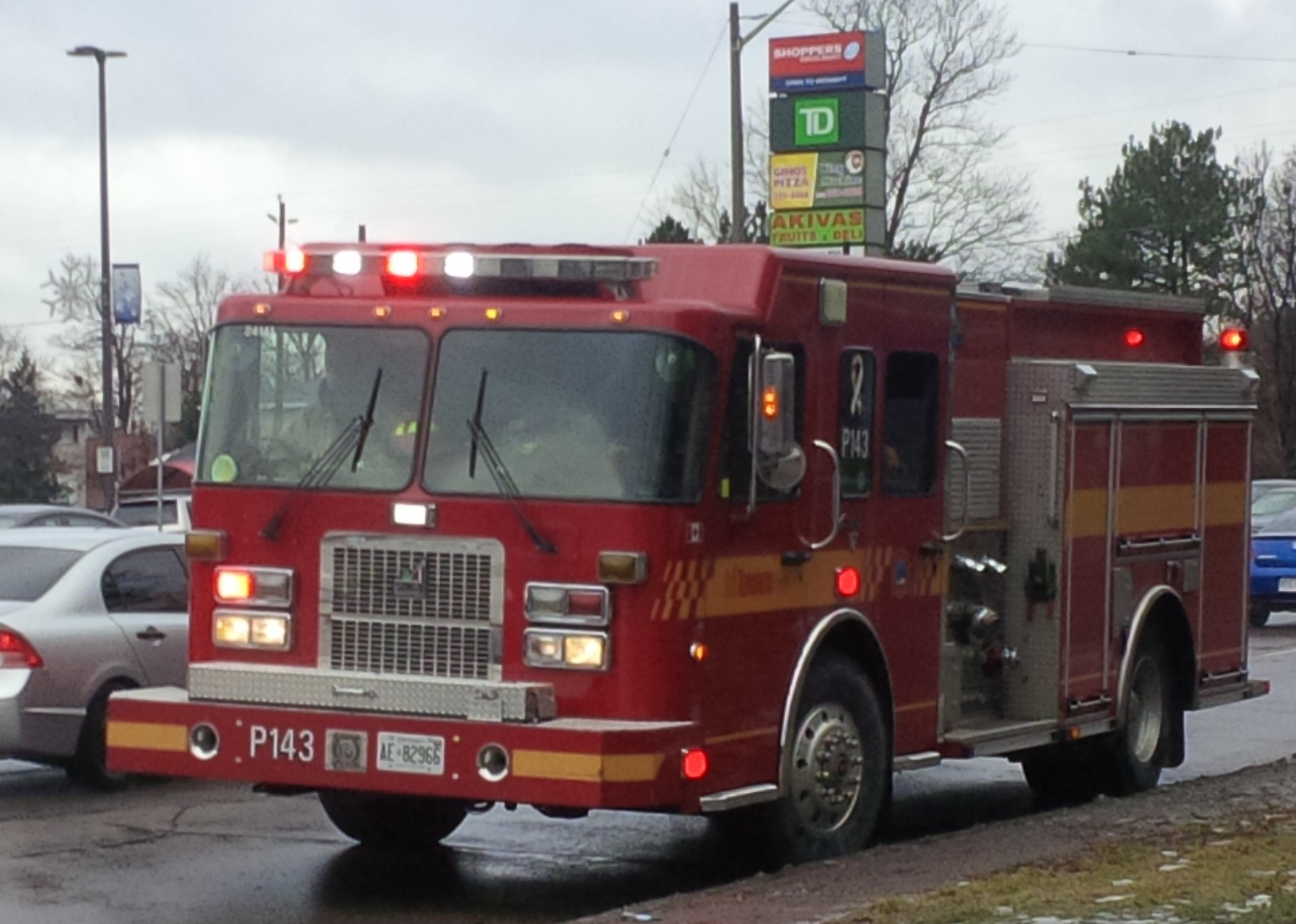
Pumper apparatus (P143)

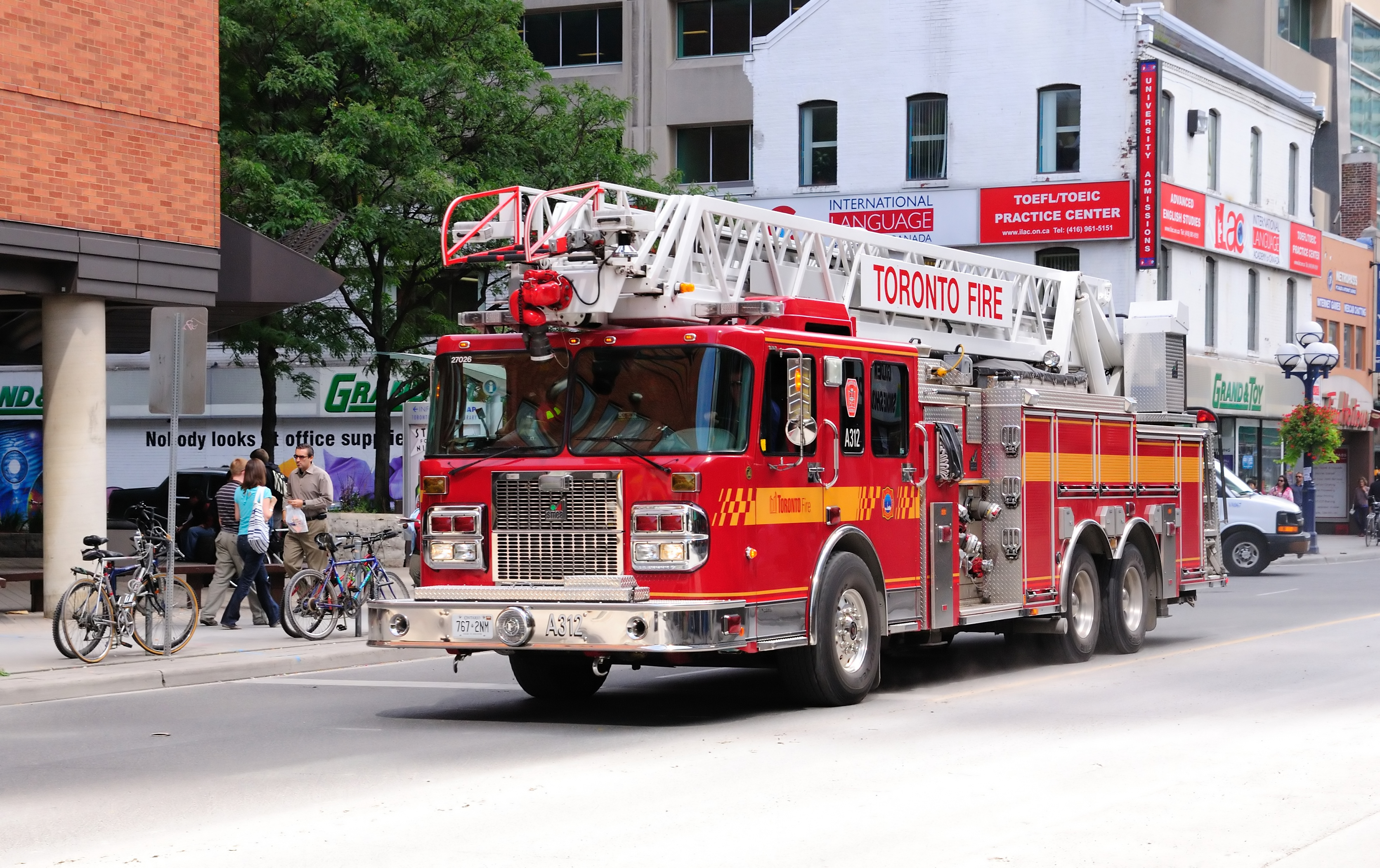
Aerial apparatus (A312)

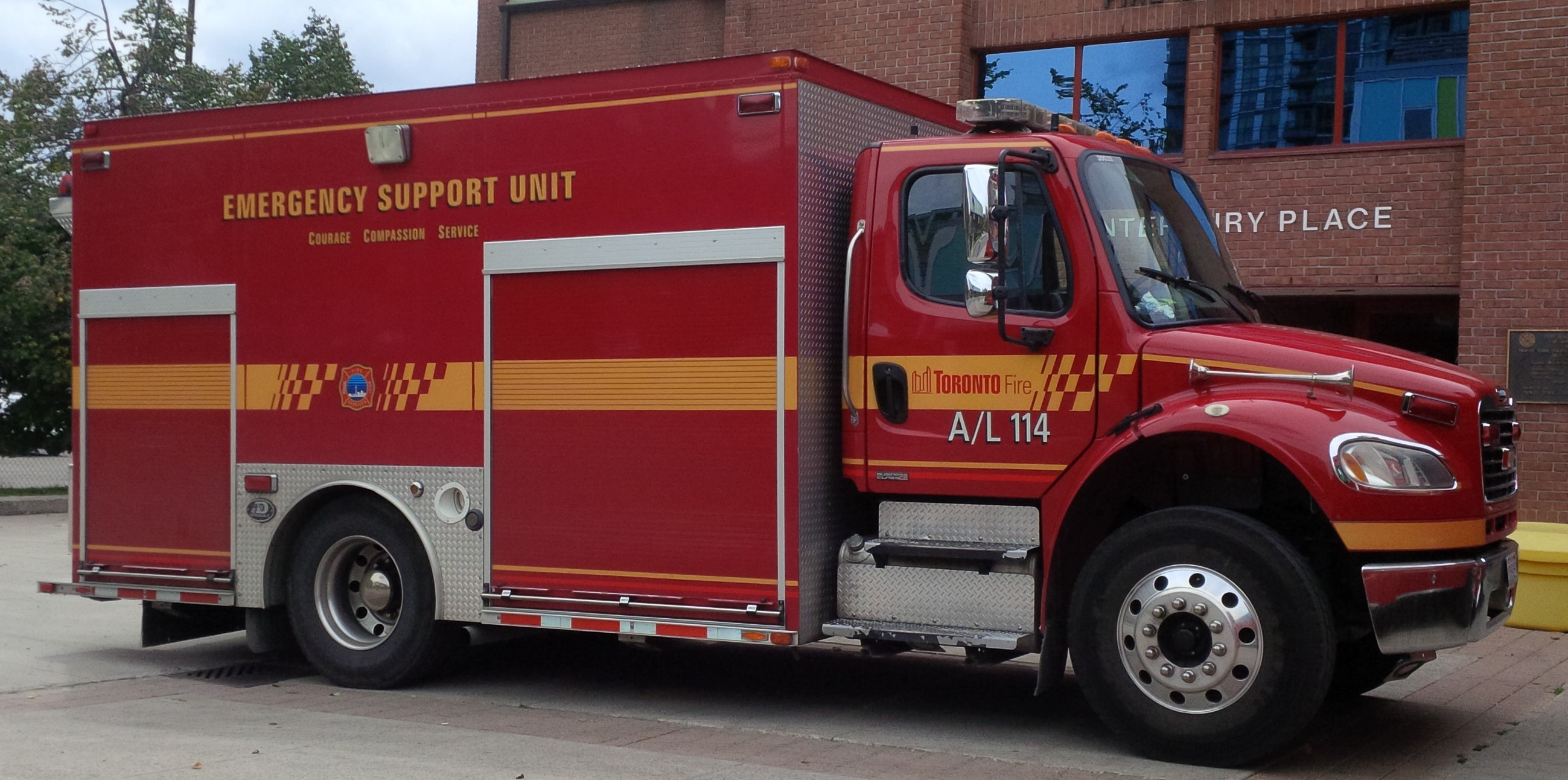
Light and air unit (AL114)

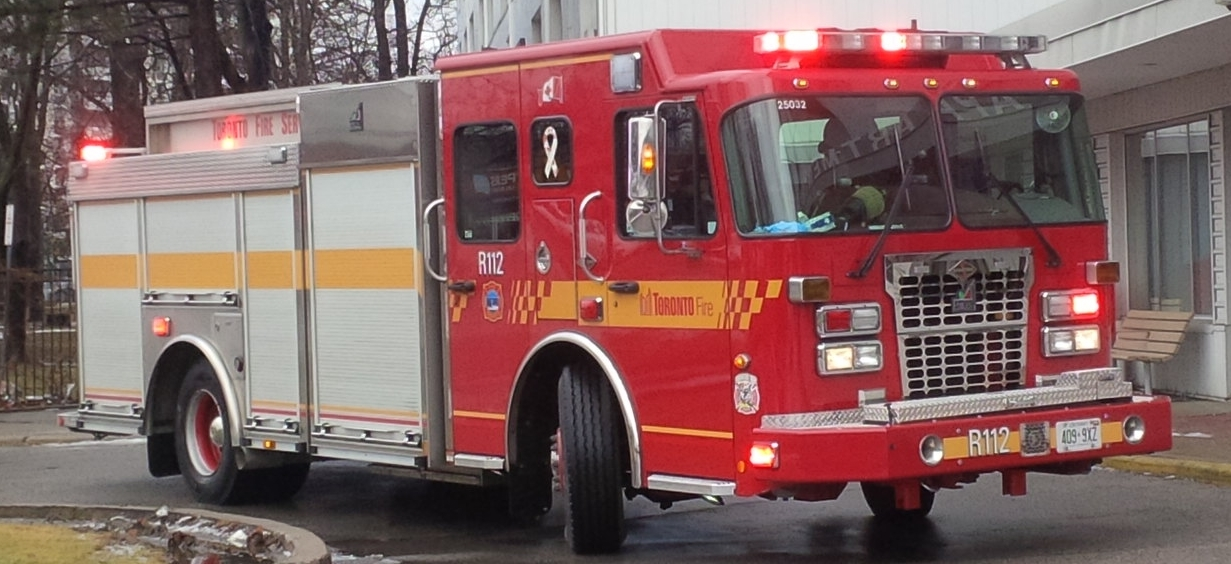
Rescue pumper apparatus (R112)

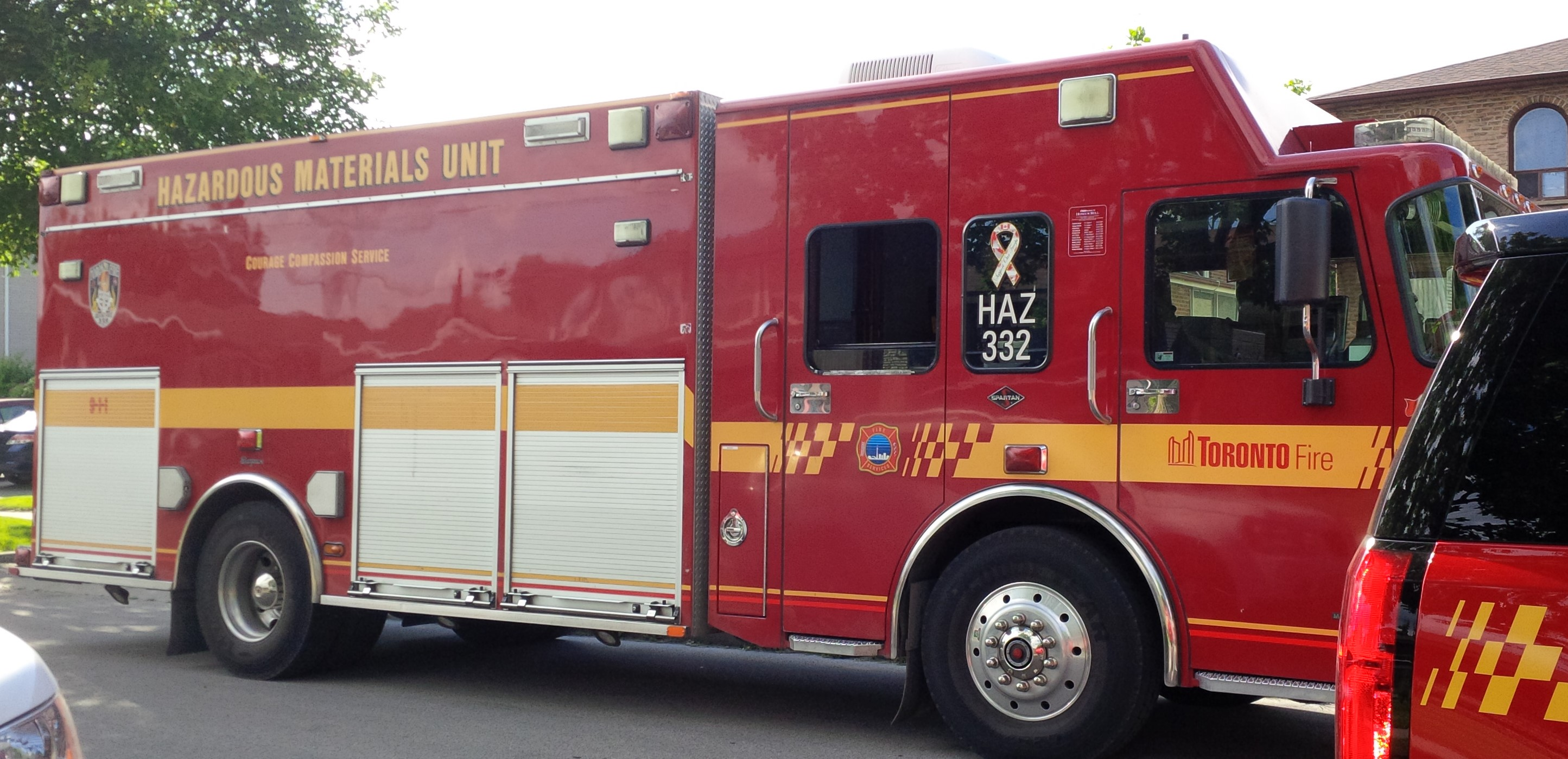
Hazardous materials unit (HAZ332)

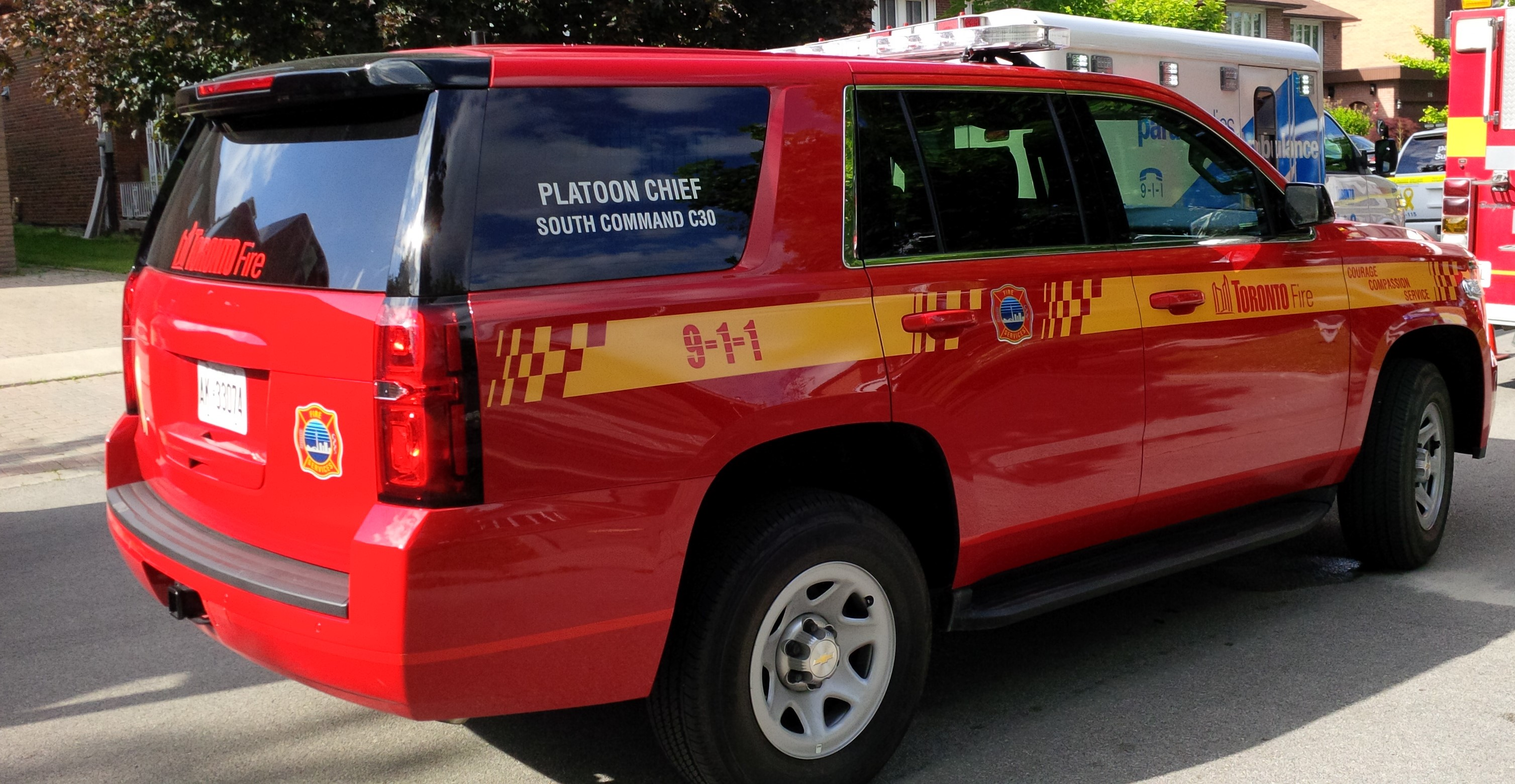
Platoon chief vehicle (C30)

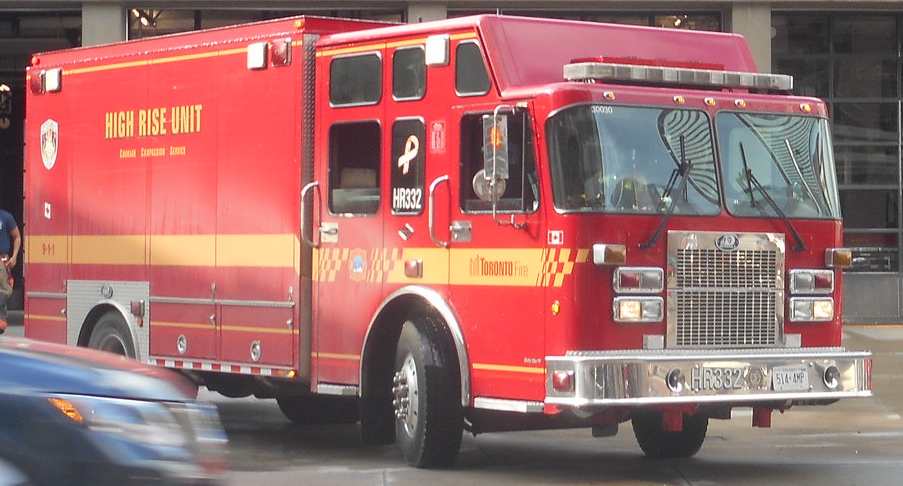
High rise unit (HR332)

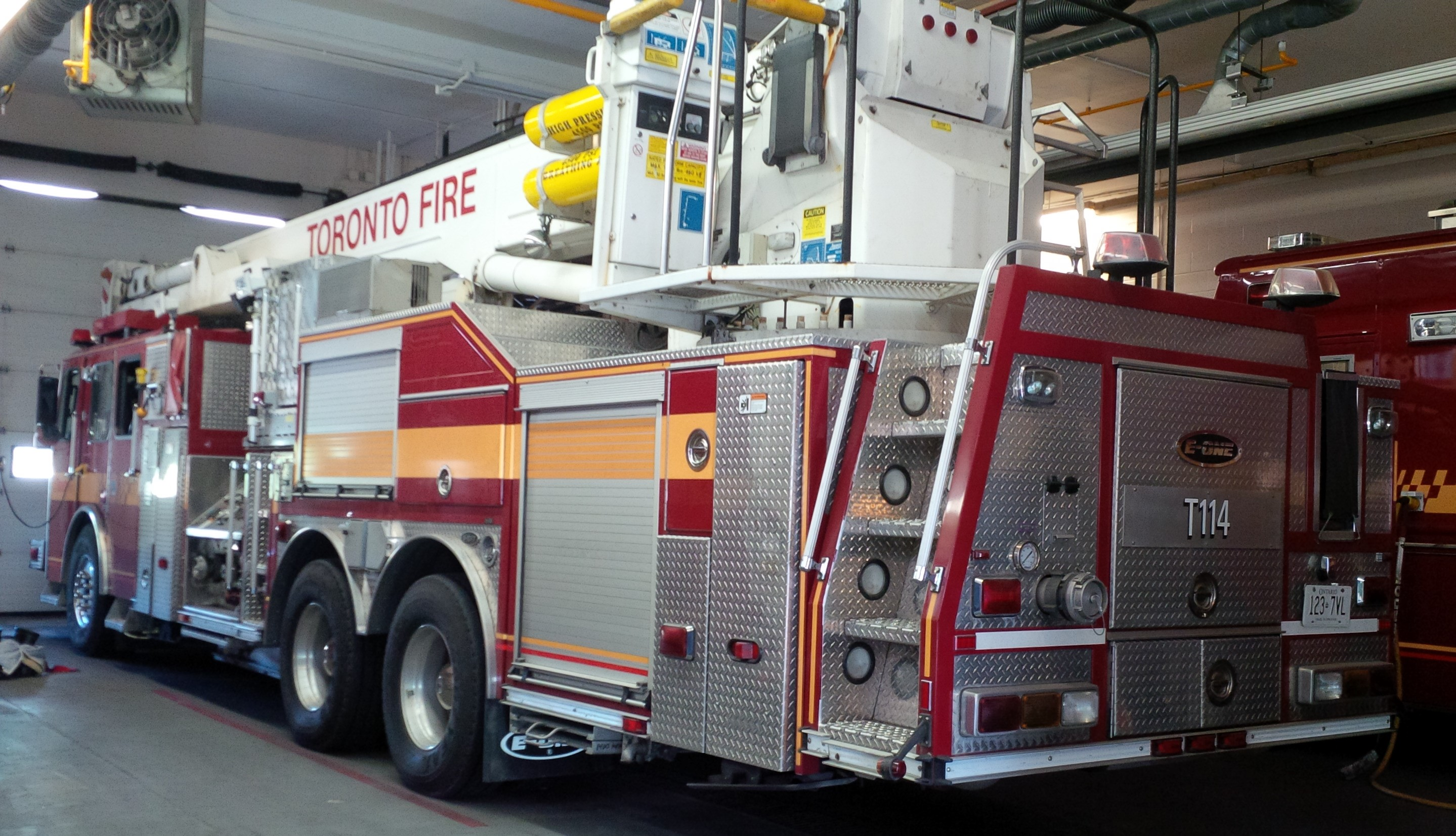
Tower aerial apparatus (T114)

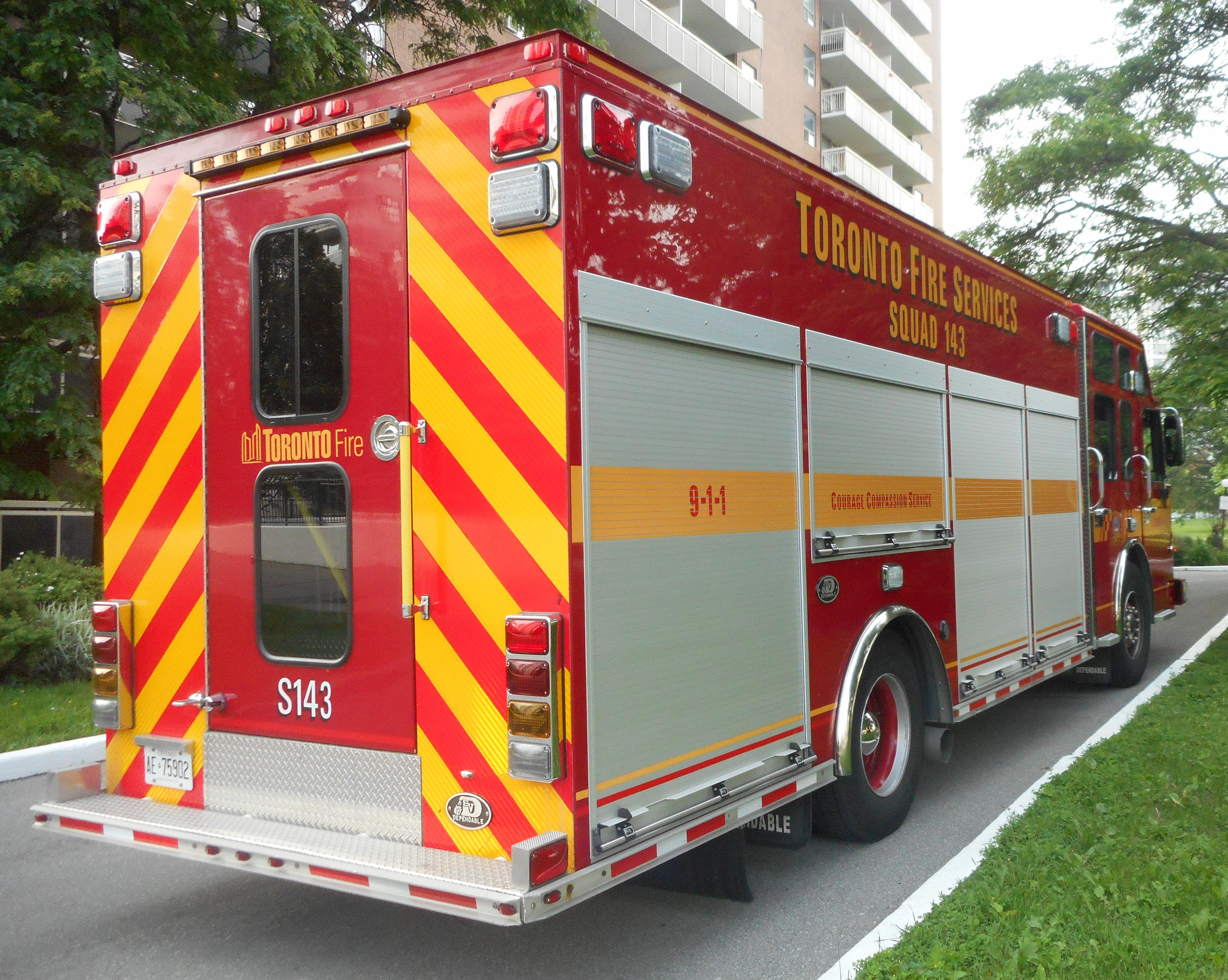
Squad heavy rescue unit (S143)

Early fire companies in Toronto used horse drawn engines and ladders. The first motorized pumper, based in the College Street station, came into use in 1911. Tiller-ladder trucks were used until the 1950s, when smaller aerial trucks were adopted to operate in narrow streets. In the 1970s, the last open air vehicles were phased out and Metro's fire departments had vehicles with fully enclosed cabs. In 2024, North America's first fully-electric fire truck was built for TFS.

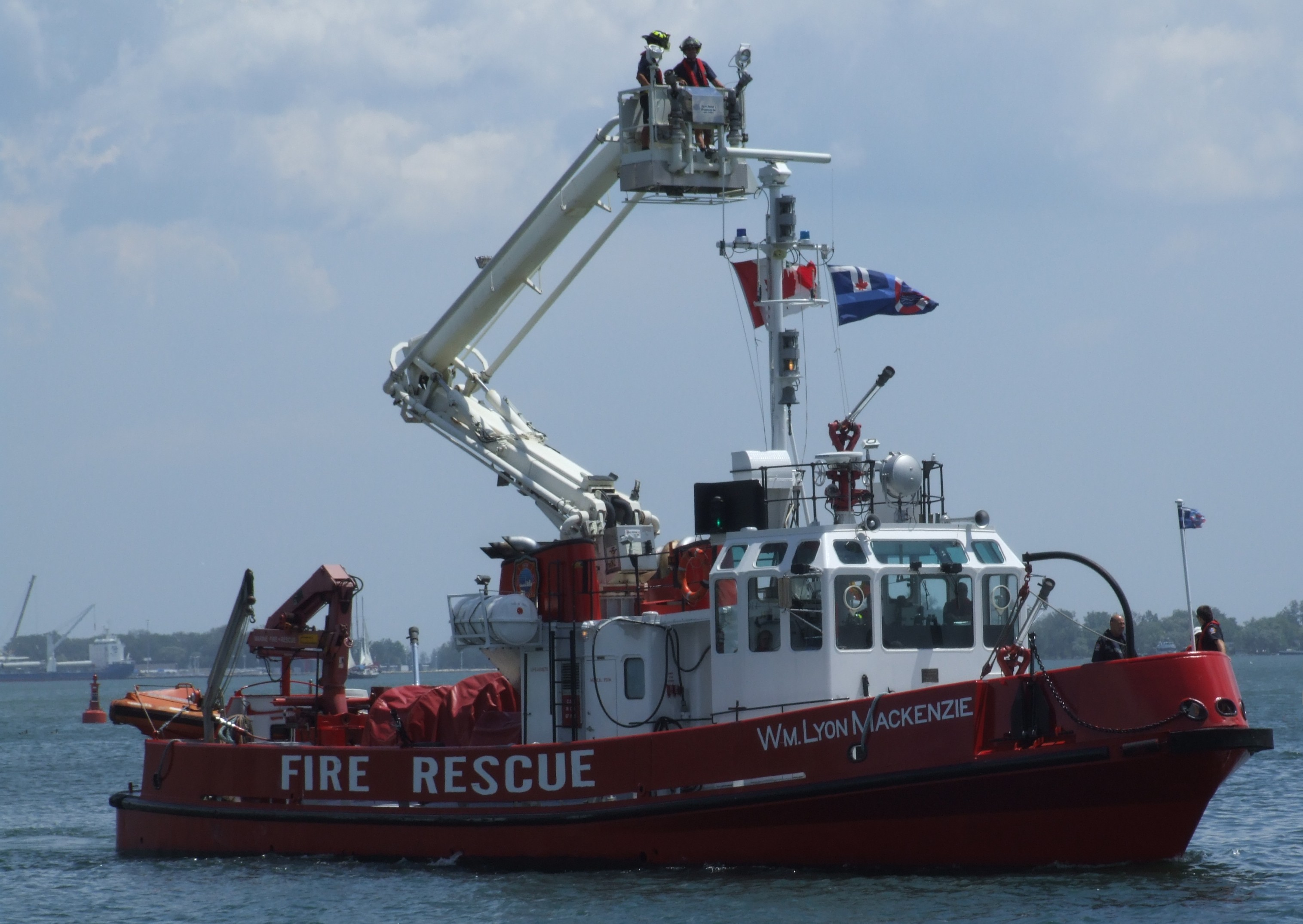
Fire boat William Lyon Mackenzie is one of two TFS fire boats.

==== Fire boats ====
The Toronto Fire Department and successor Toronto Fire Services has operated fire boats since 1923. The service presently has two fire boats in service: William Lyon Mackenzie, which entered service in 1964 and is the department's main fire boat and icebreaker; and William Thornton, a former Canadian Coast Guard cutter acquired by TFS in 2015.

== Fire stations ==
As of 2014, TFS operates 83 fire stations.These Fire Stations are organized into 15 districts.These Districts are located in 4 geographical divisions.Several companies have been disbanded or reassigned over the years.

=== North Command ===
The North Command's office (Command 1) is located at Fire Station 114. There are 21 stations in the 3 districts of North Command. (District 12 was disbanded in 2013, its 4 stations absorbed into the surrounding districts.)

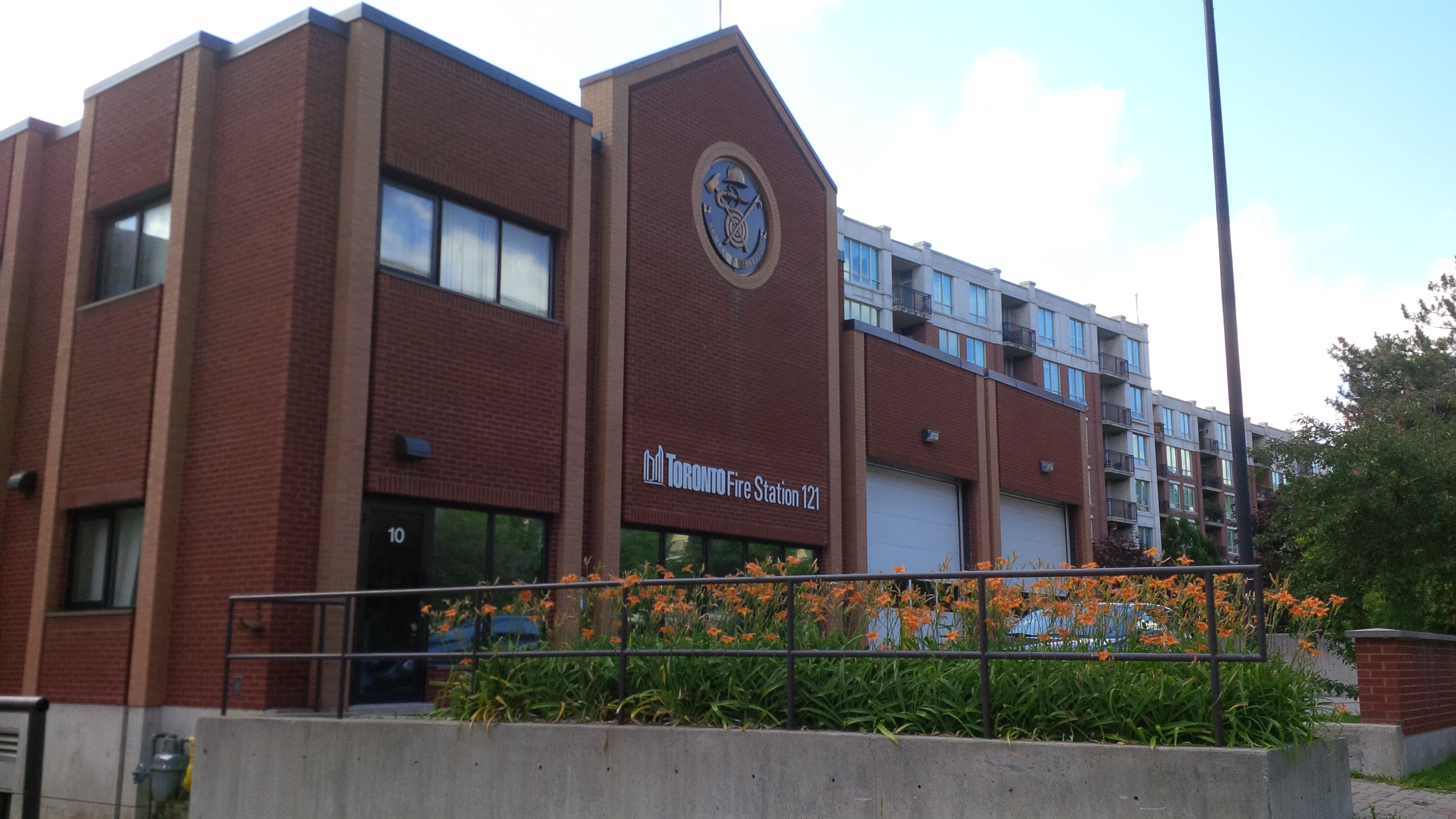
Station 121 serves the neighbourhood of Hoggs Hollow.

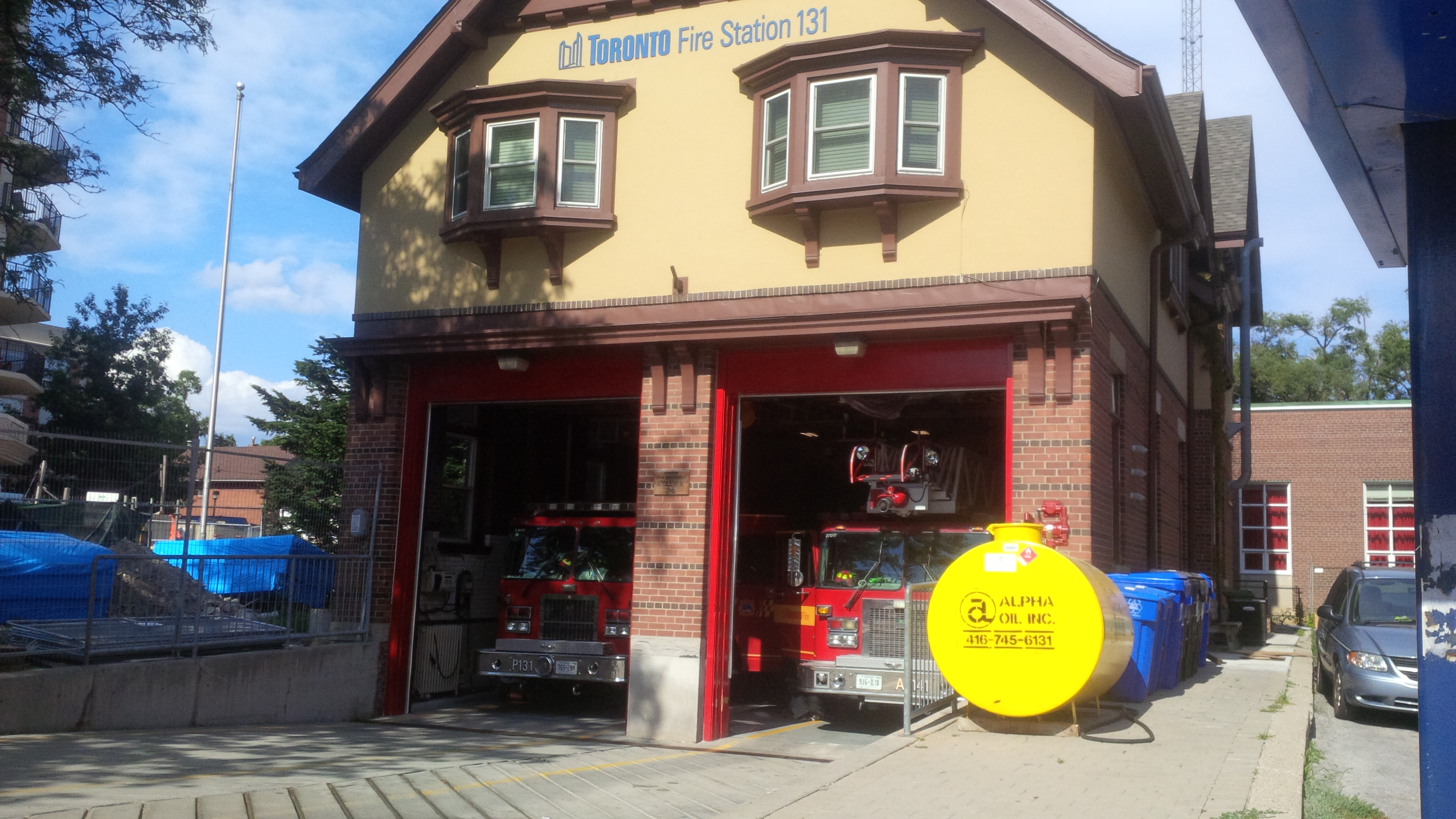
Station 131 is situated on Yonge Street.

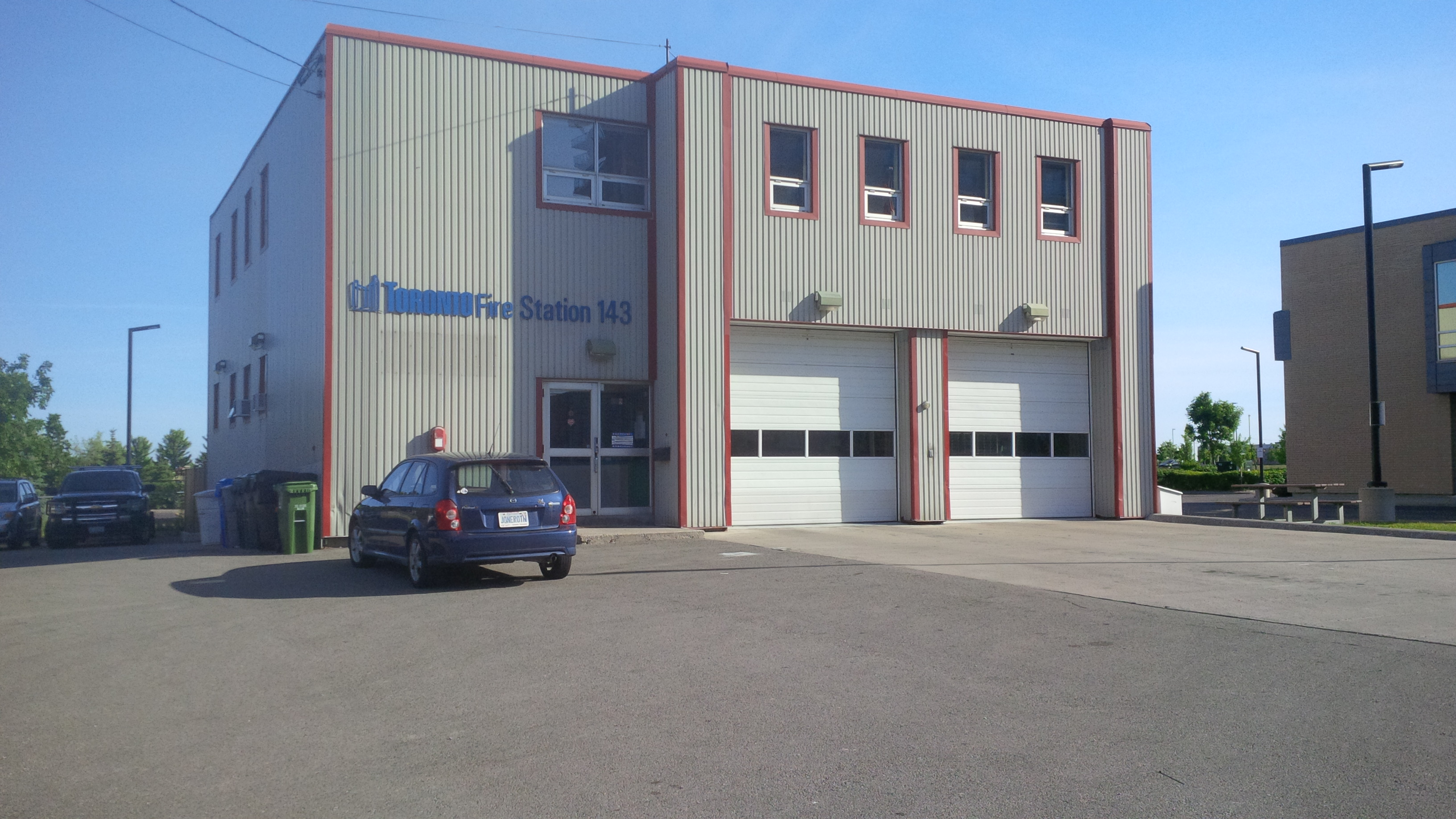
Station 143 serves the neighbourhood of Clanton Park.

=== East Command ===
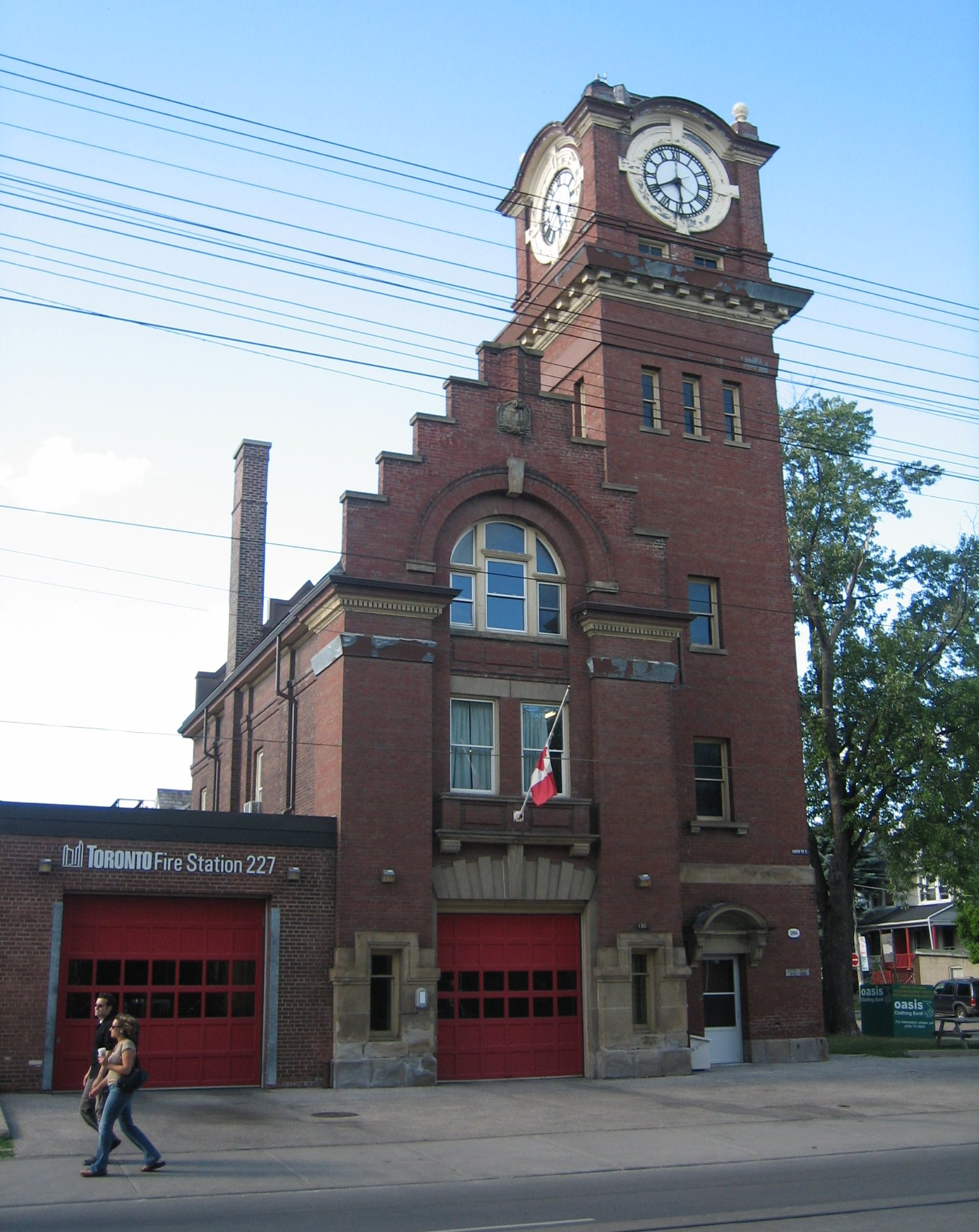
Station 227 serves the Beaches neighborhood in Toronto.

The East Command's office (Command 2) is located at Fire Station 221. There are 22 stations in the 4 districts of East Command.

=== South Command ===
The South Command's office (Command 3) is located at Fire Station 332. There are 22 stations in 4 districts of South Command.

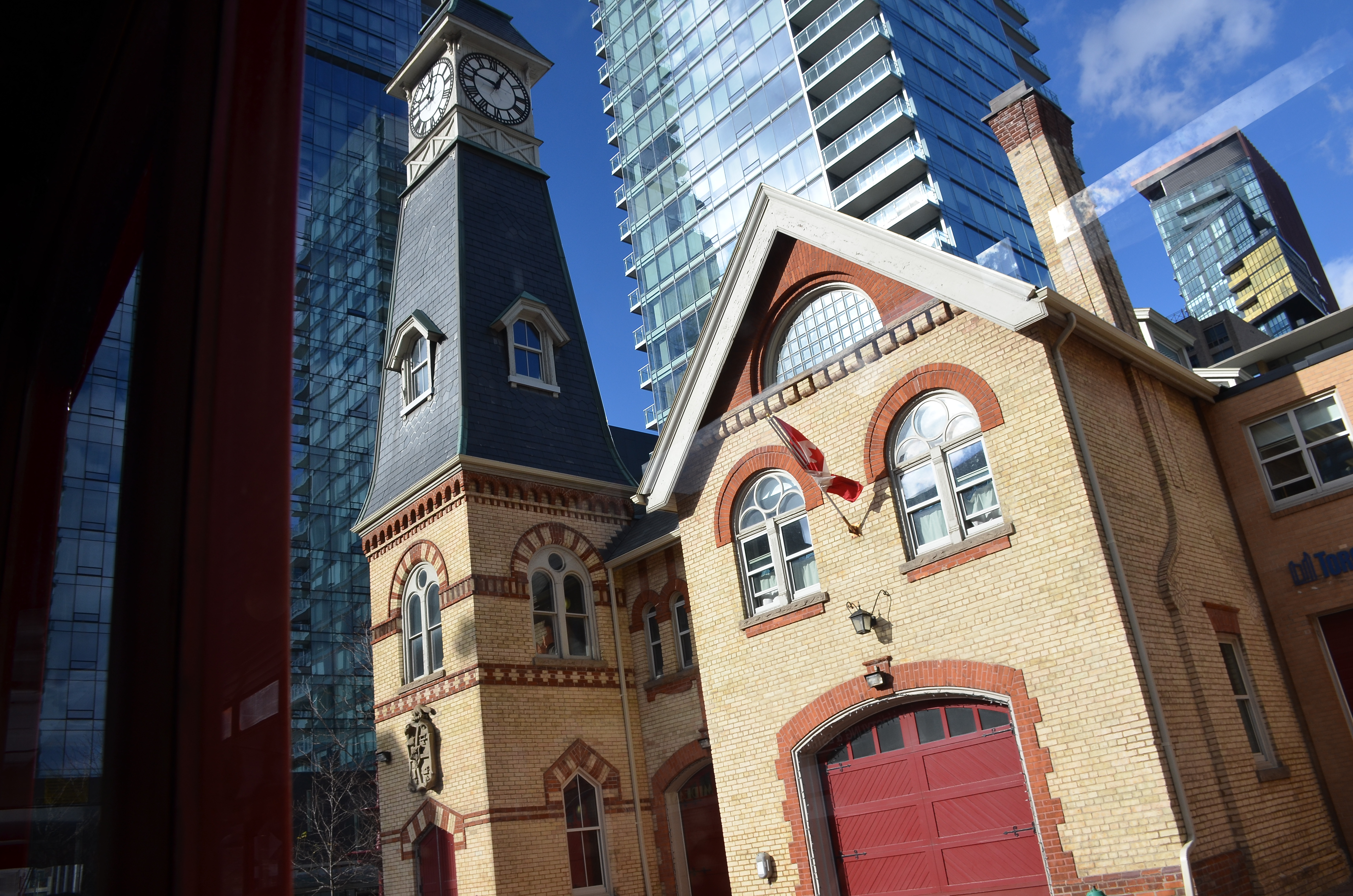
Station 312, serving the neighbourhood of Yorkville, is the oldest active fire station in Toronto.

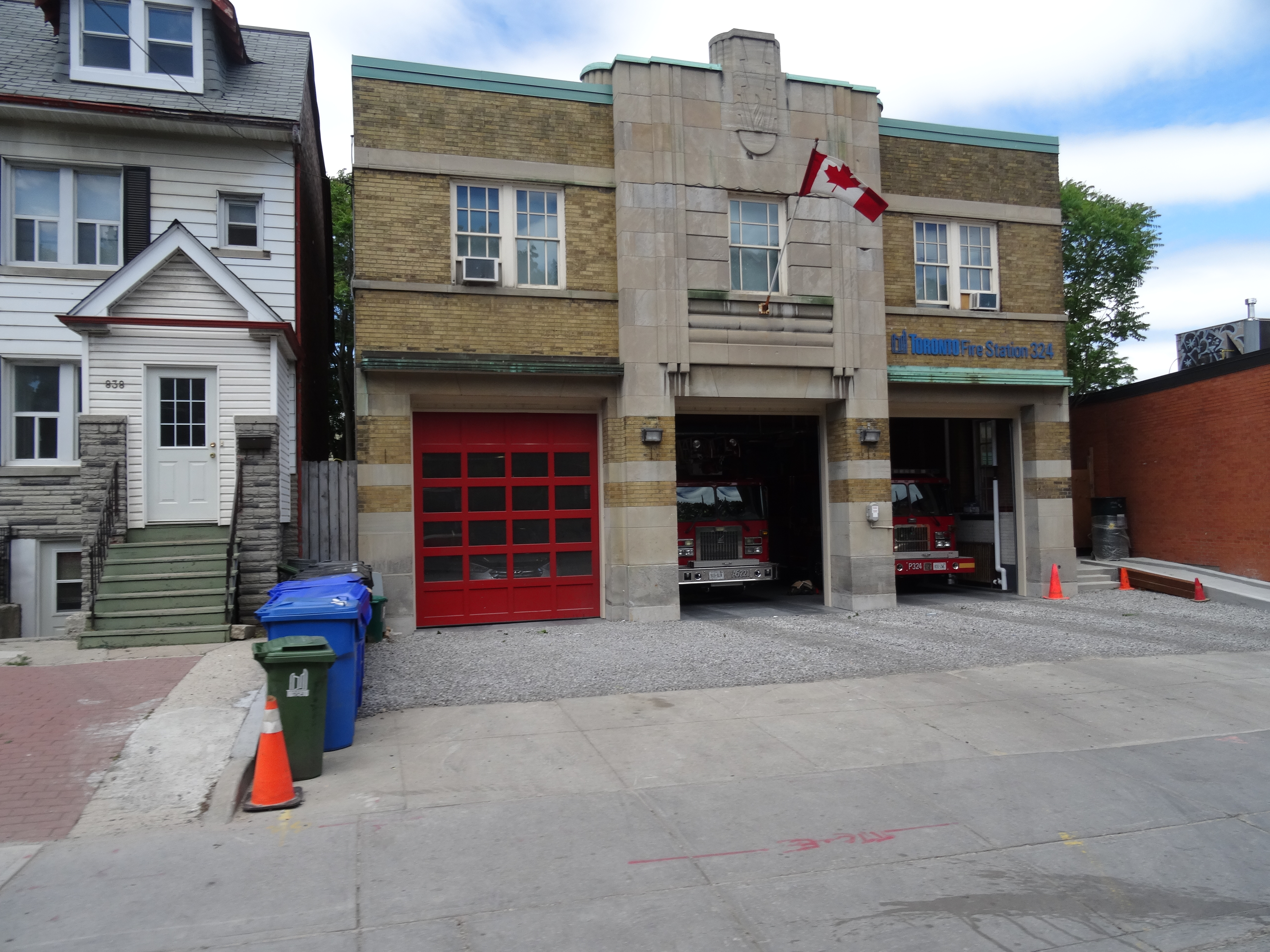
Station 324 serves the neighbourhood of Riverdale.

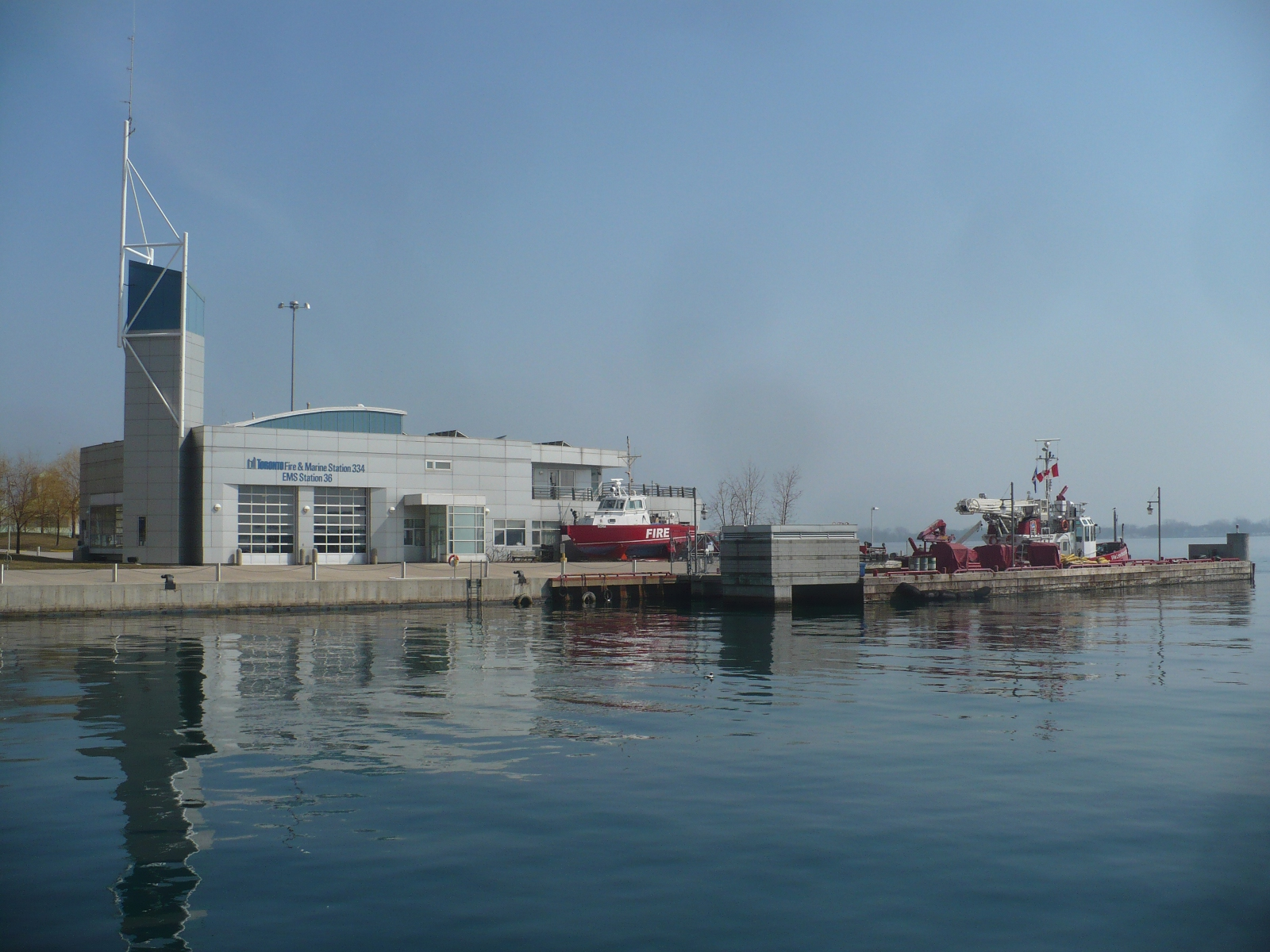
Fireboats of TFS are stored at Station 334.

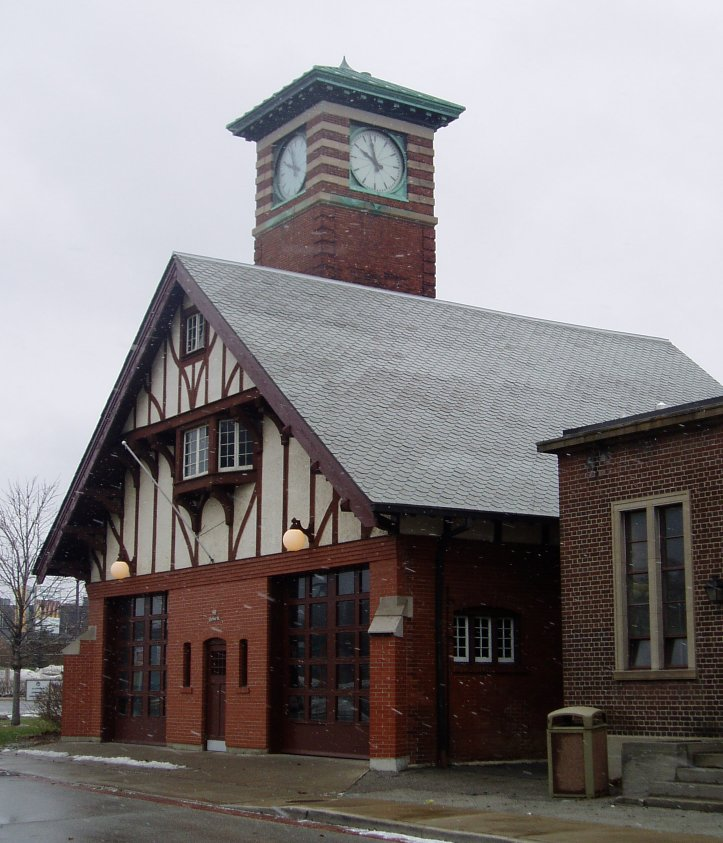
Station 346 is a seasonally open station based in Exhibition Place.

=== West Command ===
The West Command's office (Command 4) is located at Fire Station 442. There are 19 stations in the 4 districts of West Command. (Fire Station 424 at 462 Runnymede Road closed permanently in 2014.)

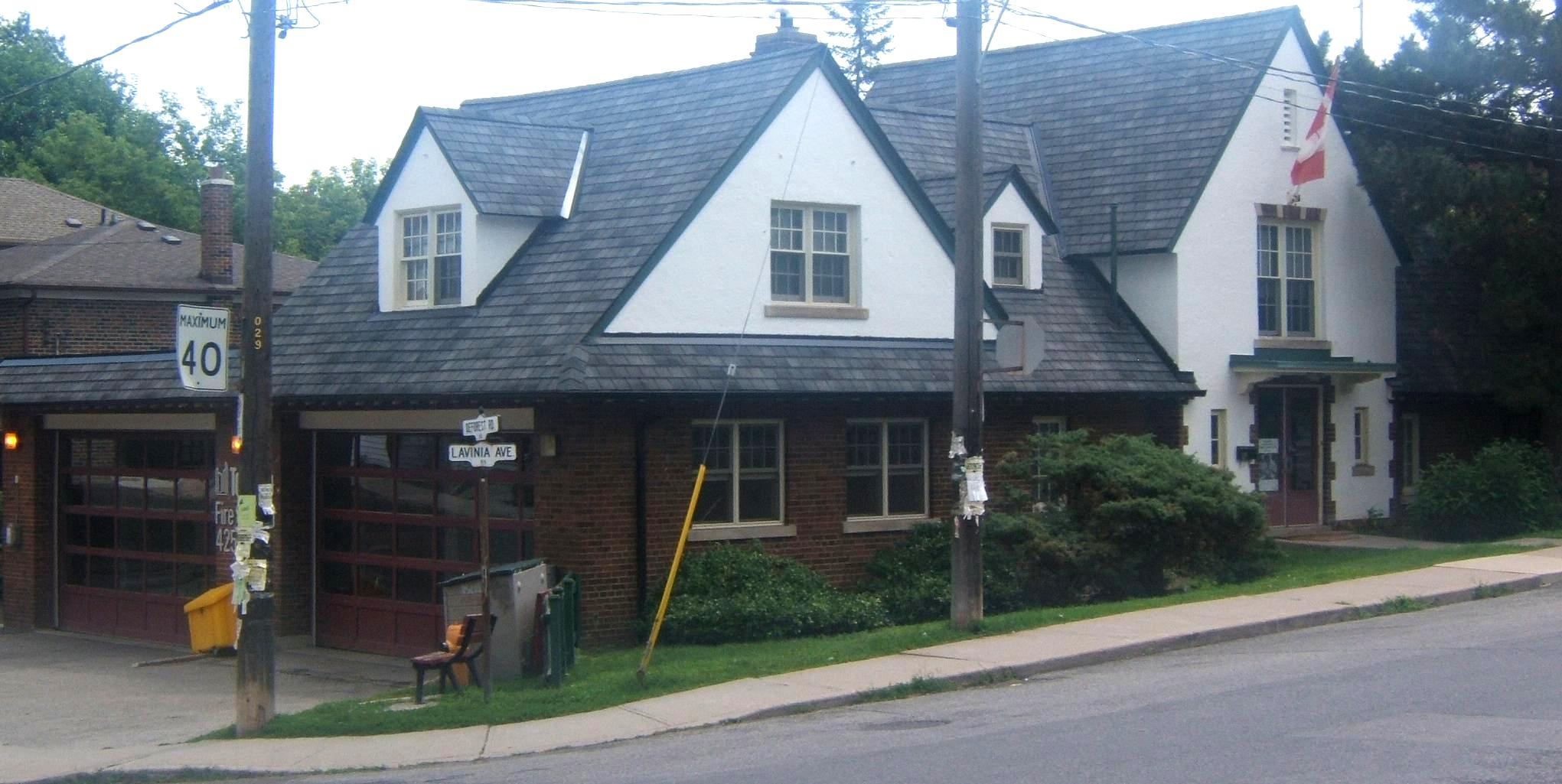
Station 425 serves the neighbourhood of Swansea.

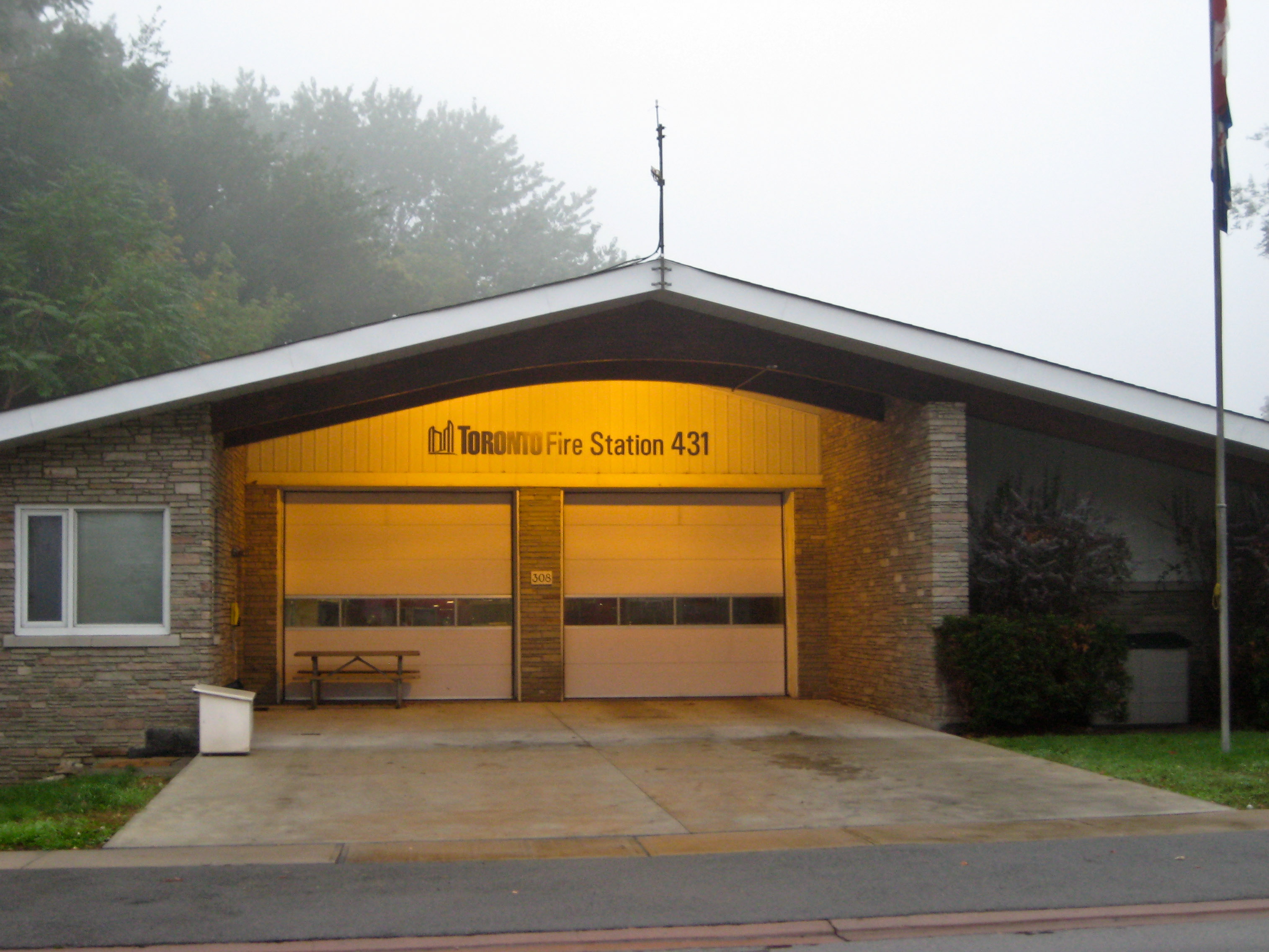
Station 431 serves the Kingsway neighbourhood.

== See also ==
- List of historic Toronto fire stations
- Woodbine Building Supply fire

Other members of Toronto's Emergency Services structure include:

- Toronto (CAN-TF3) Heavy Urban Search and Rescue
- Toronto Paramedic Services
- Toronto Police Service
