= William Lyon Mackenzie (fireboat) =

Fireboat for the Toronto Fire Services

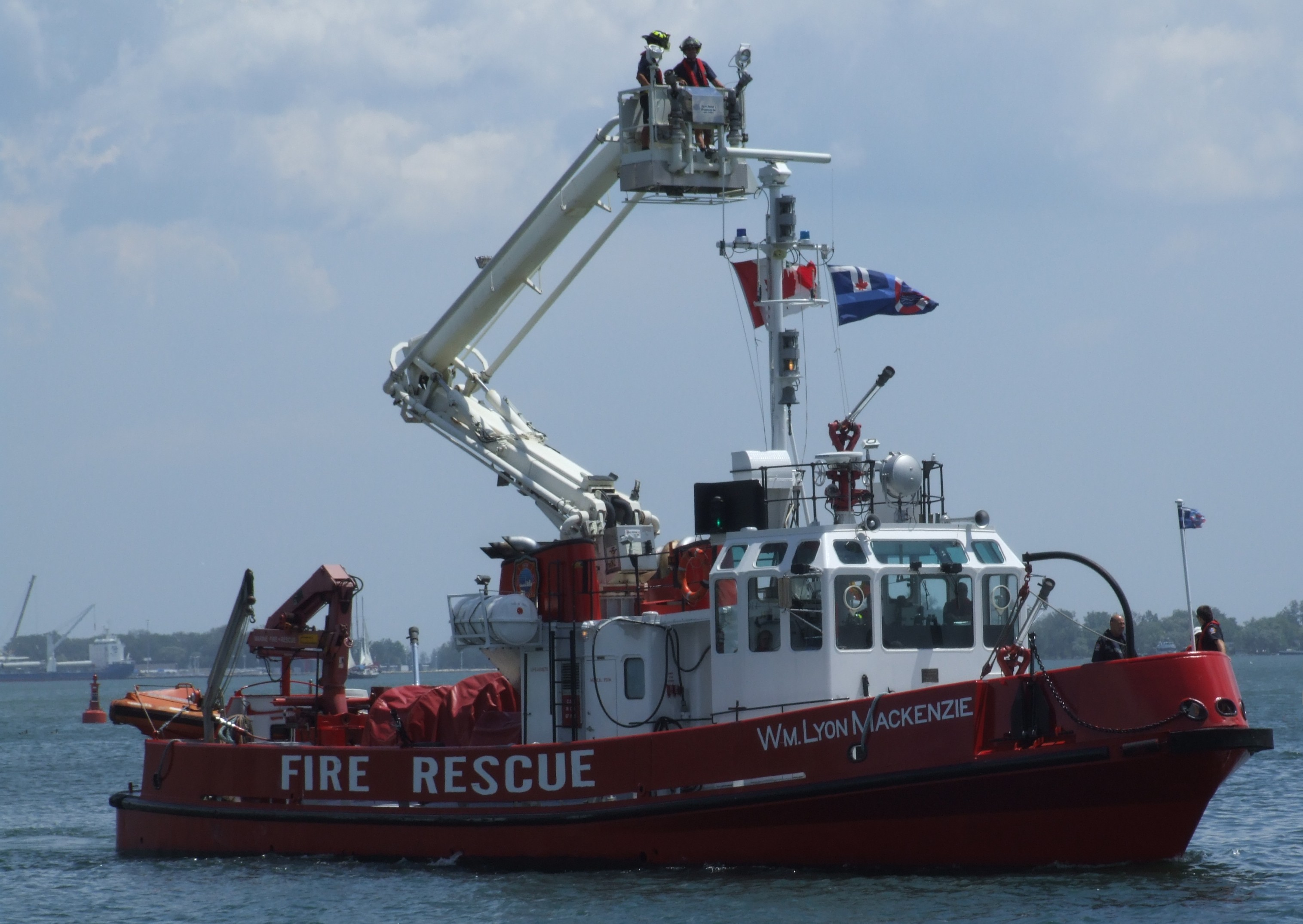

History

Toronto, Ontario
- Name: William Lyon Mackenzie
- Namesake: William Lyon Mackenzie
- Owner: City of Toronto
- Operator: Toronto Fire Services (previous Toronto Fire Department 1964-1997)
- Ordered: 1963
- Awarded: 1963
- Builder: Russel Brothers Limited, Owen Sound, Ontario
- Cost: CAD$605,000
- Yard number: 1216
- Laid down: 1963
- Launched: November 7, 1963
- Sponsored by: Canadian Maritime Commission
- Christened: 1963
- Completed: 1963
- Acquired: December 1963
- Commissioned: 1964
- Maiden voyage: December 1964
- In service: 1964-present
- Out of service: 2004 (refit)
- Reinstated: 2004
- Home port: Toronto
- Nickname(s): Mac
- Status: Active
- Notes: Named after William Lyon Mackenzie

General characteristics
- Type: Fireboat-Icebreaker
- Tonnage: 102 gt
- Displacement: 200 tonnes
- Length: 24.7m (81 feet)
- Beam: 6m (20 feet)
- Draft: 2.5m (7 feet)
- Depth: 3m
- Ice class: 1C
- Propulsion: 2 x 3412 Caterpillar Diesel
- Speed: 12 knots (13.8 mph; 22.2 km/h) - max 22km/hr
- Complement: 3, (can use boost crew of 4)
- Crew: 22

William Lyon Mackenzie, is a fireboat operated by Toronto Fire Services (TFS) which provides marine fire fighting and icebreaking capabilities within the Toronto Harbour. Built by Russel Brothers in 1964, it is named after William Lyon Mackenzie, the first mayor of Toronto. In 2004 the fireboat was refurbished and it is expected to be in service until 2037.

== Design and equipment ==
As designed, the vessel was to be equipped with radar, echo sounder, radio, and daytime accommodation for the off-duty shift.

The fireboat is equipped with:

- Aerial tower – 54' Amador/Trump Limited Giraffe (refurbished 2004)
- Hiab 5 ton crane
- 2 diesel driven water pumps
- ~10 water nozzles

== Operational history ==
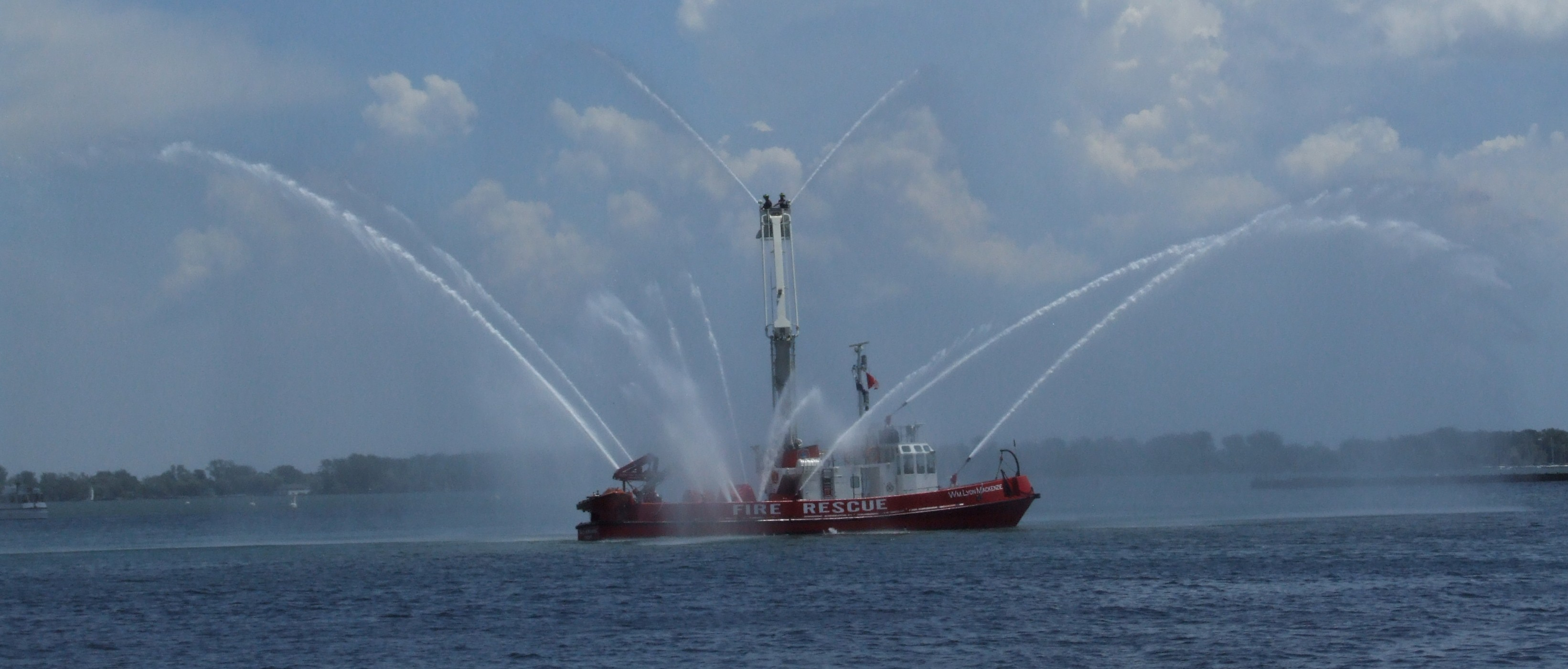
William Lyon Mackenzie in action.

Built in Owen Sound, Ontario by Russel Brothers Limited with a modified Tugboat hull. William Lyon Mackenzie operates 12 months a year, providing emergency services within Toronto Harbour and the adjacent waters of Lake Ontario. The boat is mainly docked at 339 Queen's Quay West next to Fire Station #334. It is the main fireboat for Toronto Fire Services as well as an icebreaker for the City of Toronto. William Lyon Mackenzie is one of a few fireboats to ply the Great Lakes, Edward M. Cotter is operated by Buffalo Fire Department and operates in Lake Erie. William Lyon Mackenzie does duty during the Canadian International Air Show, using its spray to make a very visible visual point of reference at the centre of the display area.

In 2004, the vessel completed a CA$1+ million refurbishment that will extend the in-service life of the vessel by approximately 30 years. The main propulsion diesels engines were replaced and the aerial platform was refurbished.

In 2015, the TFS purchased the William Thorton, a mid-shore patrol built in 1982 for the Canadian Coast Guard. The Thornton will be staffed by the crew of the Mackenzie as a backup/additional boat. The Thornton replaced the Sora which the TFS had bought in 2006. The Thornton is named after William Thornton, the first known Toronto firefighter to die fighting a fire. Thornton died in 1848.

William Lyon Mackenzie was called upon to give the newly commissioned tugboat Iron Guppy a ceremonial shower when she joined PortsToronto's fleet, on July 23, 2016.

== In popular culture ==
William Lyon Mackenzie has been featured in the TV series Mighty Machines, filmed in action by their film crew during an exercise.
