= Boats of the Mackenzie River watershed =

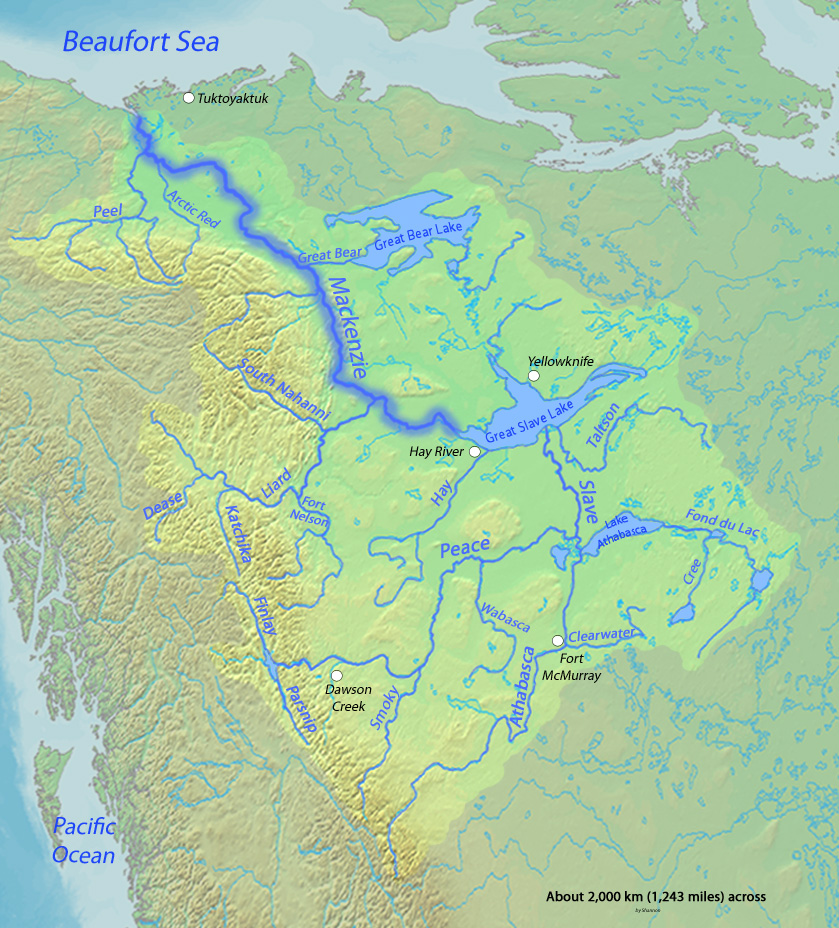
The Mackenzie River and its watershed

The Mackenzie River in Canada's Northwest Territories is a historic waterway, used for centuries by Indigenous peoples, specifically the Dene, as a travel and hunting corridor. Also known as the Deh Cho, it is part of a larger watershed that includes the Slave, Athabasca, and Peace rivers extending from northern Alberta. In the 1780s, Peter Pond, a trader with the North West Company became the first known European to visit this watershed and begin viable trade with the Athapascan-speaking Dene of these rivers. The Mackenzie River itself, the great waterway extending to the Arctic Ocean, was first put on European maps by Alexander Mackenzie in 1789, the Scottish trader who explored the river. The watershed thus became a vital part of the North American fur trade, and before the advent of the airplane or road networks, the river was the only communication link between northern trading posts and the south. Water travel increased in the late 19th century as traders, dominated primarily by the Hudson's Bay Company (HBC), looked to increase water services in the Mackenzie River District.

== Steamboat service established ==
The first steamship to ply the Mackenzie River watershed was on the Athabasca River in 1882, and its name was SS Grahame, a sternwheeler built by the HBC, operating from Athabasca Landing north of Edmonton to the Slave River rapids, the only significant obstacle en route to the Mackenzie. In 1886, SS Wrigley was launched on the other side of these rapids, at Fort Smith, and for the first time a steam-driven vessel operated on the Mackenzie River as far as Aklavik in the river delta before it spilled into the Arctic Ocean. A series of small portage trails were established between Smith's Landing (later Fort Fitzgerald) and Fort Smith to skirt the 26 km (16 mi) rapids – this was later upgraded into a full road in the 1920s.

== Effect of the Klondike Gold Rush ==
In 1898 the Klondike Gold Rush gave an impetus to the exploration of the Canadian North and the Mackenzie River basin was promoted as the best route to the Yukon if one was departing from Edmonton. The 1898–1900 period was very busy for the waterways, with many new private vessels built and running between the Athabasca and Mackenzie Rivers. In 1908, the HBC launched SS Mackenzie River, the first steam-powered shallow-draught sternwheeler ship on the Mackenzie River. In the 1920s, police, church missions, government agents, oil and mining companies, prospectors, and competing fur trade interests descended on the Northwest Territories and water transportation services boomed. Three companies competed for supremacy of the fur trade and water transportation: the HBC, Lamson & Hubbard Trading Company, Alberta & Arctic Transportation Co., and Northern Traders Company each with a fleet of steam vessels. A series of amalgamations and takeovers left only two main water operators after 1924: the HBC and Northern Traders Co. which later became the Northern Transportation Company Limited, commonly known as NTCL and now Marine Transportation Services or MTS, in the 1930s. The HBC continued in the business of transportation in conjunction with serving its own posts through Mackenzie River Transport, until 1947 when it got out of public freighting. Distributor, built in 1920 by Lamson & Hubbard, was the flagship of the HBC on the Mackenzie River for over 20 years. Communities such as Waterways (now a neighbourhood in Fort McMurray) and Fort Smith thrived as the base for shipyards along the Athabasca and Slave Rivers, respectively.

== Later years ==
Most of the old steam-driven vessels were replaced by diesel or gasoline-powered tug boats in the 1930s and 1940s. NTCL inaugurated a new fleet of steel-hull, diesel tugs in 1937, and the HBC and its transportation arm, Mackenzie River Transport Limited, got out of the common carrier business in 1947. The last steam-propelled sternwheelers, SS Distributor and SS Mackenzie, were retired around the same time. In later years, with the construction of the Mackenzie Highway from Alberta to Great Slave Lake, the importance of the Athabasca–Slave River route dwindled and NTCL operations were based from shipyards in Hay River, after 1959. NTCL became the primary water operator in the Mackenzie River watershed with the purchase of HBC's fleet and equipment in 1958, and the total buyout of Yellowknife Transportation Company in 1965 including its fleet of diesel tug boats. Other small commercial operators on the Mackenzie River included Kap's Transport, owned by Ron Kapchinsky, starting barge service out of Fort Providence in 1969–70; and Streepers Brothers Marine Transport and Cooper Barging Services based out of Fort Nelson, British Columbia, in the 1960s–1970s with operations mostly on the Fort Nelson and Liard Rivers. The northern barge traffic, now almost solely provided by Cooper Barging Services basing their marine services from Fort Simpson and Marine Transportation Services, now owned by the territorial government, based in Hay River are still essential to the heavy freight as fuel, food, and heavy equipment can be moved economically in the summer months to communities along the Mackenzie River and oil fields of the Beaufort Sea.

== List of historical vessels ==
Only boats used in a commercial or industrial capacity are listed here. Ship prefixes used historically but often interchangeably depending on convention at the time: AS (auxiliary sloop), CGS (coast guard ship), CCGS (Canadian coast guard ship), MB (motorboat), MS (motor ship), MT (motor transport), MV (motor vessel), SS (steamship). All measurements were originally imperial.

Image	Name	Launched	Notes
	Adanac		Schooner operating out of Aklavik in the Mackenzie Delta c. 1940. It was an Anglican mission boat and was for sale in 1945.
	Aggie May	1956	Steel-hulled fish packer (17 m (55 ft) long, 4.3 m (14 ft) wide, 2.1 m (7 ft) draft, two 95 hp (71 kW) engines) owned by Menzies Fisheries on Great Slave Lake 1961–1967. Between 1977 and 2008 it was owned by Alaska Fisheries (166) Limited.
	Aklavik	1923	Motor schooner (18 m (58 ft) long, 4.9 m (16 ft) beam, 1.5 m (5 ft) draft, Fairbanks-Morse diesel engine) built in Fort Smith 1923 by George Askew, and used by the Hudson's Bay Company in the western Arctic Ocean and Mackenzie Delta from 1923 to 1928, followed after salvage and repairs with service in the Northwest Passage to Cambridge Bay and King William Island. In 1942 it was sold to Patsy Klengenberg, son of Christian Klengenberg, of Cambridge Bay. It was destroyed by fire on August 31, 1946, in port at Cambridge Bay, killing Patsy Klengenberg.
	Aklavik I	1930	Motor schooner (14 m (47 ft) long, 3.7 m (12 ft) wide, 1.1 m (3.5 ft) draft, 15-ton capacity, 35 hp (26 kW) Fairbanks-Morse engine) used by the Royal Canadian Mounted Police (RCMP) for patrols in the Mackenzie Delta, Aklavik and Herschel Island areas 1933-c.1936. Built by George Askew in Vancouver in 1930, it was originally called the Akuvik and owned by the Hudson's Bay Company. The boat was renamed the Herschel I in 1933 by the RCMP and then the Aklavik I in 1936. In 1945 the vessel was surplused and sold by the RCMP.
	Aklavik II	1946	Apparently a separate vessel from the other Aklavik II built in 1953? Wood patrol vessel (9.8 m (32 ft) long, 2.7 m (9 ft) wide, screw propulsion) used by the Royal Canadian Mounted Police for patrols in the Mackenzie Delta, Aklavik area 1946-1965 when it was surplused and sold.
	Aklavik II	1953	Motor schooner (14 m (45 ft) long, 83 hp (62 kW) diesel engine) used by the Royal Canadian Mounted Police for patrols in the Mackenzie Delta, Aklavik and Inuvik area 1954–1960. Renamed the RCMP Jennings in 1961.
	Alcan	1942	Steamboat sternwheeler operated from 1942 to 1961 on the Peace River near Fort St. John. In 1946, it was purchased by Imperial Oil Limited and moved over the Vermilion Chutes for use on the Slave/Athabasca Rivers and possibly further north in the Mackenzie River routes. In 1954 it was owned by the Northern Transportation Company Limited (NTCL). It was the last paddlewheeler to operate on the Peace River system.
	Alcan II	1947	Motor tugboat (18 m (58 ft) long, 5.2 m (17 ft) wide, 1.1 m (3.5 ft) draft, 140 hp (100 kW) engine) owned by Pfeffer Trading Company on the Mackenzie River with home port of Inuvik, Northwest Territories, between 1954 and 1979.
	Alpha (AKA Alfa)	1903	Steamship built in 1902/1903 by Nagle & Hislop Traders at Fort Resolution, Great Slave Lake. It was moved over the portage in 1903 to serve the Slave/Athabasca River routes between Fort Fitzgerald and Fort McMurray.
	Angus Sherwood	1969	Diesel tugboat (49 m (160 ft) long, 12 m (40 ft) beam, 1.68 m (5 ft 6 in) draft, 4,300 hp (3,200 kW)) launched by Northern Transportation Company Limited in 1969 for use in the Western Arctic of the NWT. Renamed the Kitikmeot, and then Pat Lyall in 2006.
	Arctic Circle No. 1	1969	Diesel tugboat launched by Kaps Transport Ltd in 1969 for use on the Mackenzie River.
	Arctic Duchess	1961	See the Eckaloo and Hay River II.
	Arctic Kugaluk	1973	Diesel tugboat (31 m (102 ft) long, 11.6 m (38 ft) beam, 1.4 m (4 ft 7 in) draft) launched by Arctic Navigation Ltd (Arcnav) as the Edwin Lindberg in 1973 for use on the Mackenzie River. New engines installed 2003. Home port is Hay River. In 2019 it is owned by the Government of the Northwest Territories and dry docked in Hay River.
	Arctic Lady	1934	Originally called the Dease Lake. In 1963 it was owned by Yellowknife Transportation Company on Great Slave Lake and operating under the name Arctic Lady. In 1966, it was planned to use the boat, together with the 'Liard River' boat, to ferry tourists from Yellowknife to the Frontier Fishing Tours camp near Snowdrift (Lutselk'e) on Great Slave Lake. It operated as a luxury tour boat for approximately five years and then sold to Menzies Fisheries as a fish cleaning station, first at Dawson Landing, Marnine Point and finally, in 1969, at Moose Bay on the North Arm of Great Slave Lake, where it was abandoned. Ruins of the boat are still visible today in Moose Bay. According to the official registry, from 1979 to 2004 it was owned by Robert Harcourt of Edmonton, Alberta.
	Arctic Rover	1918	Tug boat owned by Arctic Shipping Limited in the western Arctic Ocean to Tuktoyaktuk, 1958–1962. It was formerly a Royal Canadian Navy minesweeper, HMCS Armentières from 1918 to 1947.
	Argo		Steamship used on Great Slave Lake in 1899 during early gold prospecting in the area. Owned by Fred Gaudet in 1899.
	Aspen		Boat built in 1947 by Masterbilt Boats Limited for use of the government game warden in the Wood Buffalo National Park area (Slave/Peace Rivers) where it was still being used in 1952.
	Atha (MV)	1957	The Atha was originally owned by the federal government on the Athabasca River system. It was still operating on the Athabasca in the 2010s owned by Guy Thacker of Fort Chipewyan, Alberta. Still in service in 2019 by Fort Chip Marine Transport Limited.
	Athabasca (SS)	1888	Steam-driven sternwheeler (41 m (135 ft) long, 8.5 m (28 ft) beam) operated by the Hudson's Bay Company, built in 1888 to operate from Athabasca Landing to Grand Rapids on the Athabasca River and Lesser Slave Lake. It was decommissioned in 1899.
	Athabasca River (SS)	1912	Steam-driven sternwheeler (41 m (136 ft) long, 8.5 m (28 ft) beam, 340 tons gross tonnage) built and launched in 1912 at Athabasca Landing by the Hudson's Bay Company to operate on the Athabasca and upper Peace River. The vessel was decommissioned in 1920 and hauled up on the banks of Peace River, Alberta and used as a warehouse by the HBC until destroyed by fire in 1930.
	Athabasca River	1922	Steam-driven sternwheeler (45 m (146 ft) long, 11 m (36 ft) beam, 200 tons cargo, 48 passengers) built and launched in 1922 by the Hudson's Bay Company to operate between Fort McMurray and Fort Fitzgerald on the Athabasca and Slave Rivers. The vessel was overhauled in 1936, and operated until 1946 when it was retired. It was not used during the 1947 shipping season.
	Aurora Surveyor	1970	A research vessel (24.7 m (81 ft) long, 7.3 m (24 ft) beam, steel-hulled, twin screw 240 bhp (180 kW) engines) built by Alem Construction Company in 1970 in Hay River. It was later used as a freighter by Arctic Transportation Ltd. In 1990, it was sold to Steve McGovern and Wendy Irvine and towed to Yellowknife for conversion into a houseboat, where it remains today (2017).
	Aurous		Boat owned by R.M. Wynn, sawmill operator on the Jean/Slave River c. 1942, who used it for hauling lumber to Yellowknife and other communities around Great Slave Lake.
	B.E.A.R.	1932	Diesel boat cabin cruiser (11 m (35 ft) long) commissioned by Bear Exploration and Radium Limited for use on Great Bear Lake, Northwest Territories and used to support its silver and uranium mine 1932–1939. Built by Captain J. Matheson in Edmonton. Later abandoned near Port Radium.
	Banksland (MV)	1953	Diesel tug boat (51 m (166 ft) long, 8.2 m (27 ft) beam, 3.0 m (10 ft) draft, 500 hp (370 kW), 650-ton cargo capacity). It was originally the MS Auriga, purchased by the HBC in 1956 and used in the western Arctic Ocean to supply its trading posts for many years. From 1965 to 1980 it was owned by the Northern Transportation Company Limited.
	Barbara J II	1965	Diesel tug boat (12 m (40 ft) long, 400 hp (300 kW)) owned by Ed Cooper operating on the Liard River below Fort Nelson in 1968. Retired, on display beside Cooper Barging Services’ office in Fort Nelson.
	Barbara Jean		Boat owned by Fred Norris at Aklavik, Mackenzie Delta c.1956.
	Beaufort Sea Explorer	1971	Tug boat (2,500 hp (1,900 kW)) owned by Kaps Transport Limited for use on the Mackenzie River and Beaufort Sea, launched in June 1971. In 1976, Kap's marine transport division was sold to Arctic Transportation Company. Subsequent owners renamed the vessel Hudson's Bay Explorer in 1996. Still in service in 2005.
	Beaver	1947	Boat built in 1947 by Palmer & Williams for use of the government game warden in Fort Liard, Fort Simpson, and Wrigley, but appears to have been used on the Slave/Athabasca River network during 1947 season. In 1948 the Beaver was transferred to Aklavik for the game warden and then to Fort Fitzgerald on the Slave River and was based at Wood Buffalo National Park in 1952.
	Beaver Lake	1938	Diesel tug (22 m (73 ft) long, 4.7 m (15.5 ft) wide, 1.5 m (5 ft) draft) owned by the Hudson's Bay Company on the Athabasca/Slave River routes 1938-c.1946, serving the gold mining town of Goldfields, on Lake Athabasca, Saskatchewan. In 1958–1961, it was owned by McInnes Products Limited as part of a commercial fishing fleet on Lake Athabasca.
	Beaver River		Tug boat owned by Ed Cooper on the Liard River and Fort Nelson River based out of Fort Nelson in 1942.
	Birch	1952	Motor boat owned by Government of Canada on Great Slave Lake with home port in Yellowknife. It was used by the game warden and other federal officials during summer patrols, 1952–c.1957 in Yellowknife and Fort Resolution areas.
	Blue		Diesel tug (100 hp (75 kW)) owned by Jim McRitchie, operator of a sawmill on the Slave River in 1947. The boat moved milled lumber to customers in Yellowknife and around Great Slave Lake.
	Broadhead	1971	A commercial fish-packing vessel (26 m (84 ft) long, 440 bhp (330 kW) engine) operating on Great Slave Lake in 1976. It was owned by Freshwater Fish Marketing Corporation in 1979–2003.
	Buffalo	1948	Motor boat built in 1947 by Cliff Richardon Boat Works, and used by the Government of Canada on Great Slave Lake 1948–1961 with home ports in Fort Smith/Fort Fitzgerald, Slave River. It was used by the game warden and other federal officials in management and patrols of the Slave River and Great Slave Lake areas until its retirement in 1961. Captained by Billy McNeill from 1951 to 1961. Replaced by the MV Inconnu in 1962.
	Buffalo Lake	1930	Gas freight boat (28 m (91 ft) long, 5.9 m (19.5 ft) wide, 1.4 m (4.6 ft) draft) owned by Hudson's Bay Company and built in 1930 at Peace River Crossing. In 1938 it was converted into a tugboat. In 1956 it was converted to a barge.
	C.E. Sloan	1932	Diesel boat cabin cruiser (11 m (35 ft) long) commissioned by Great Bear Minerals Limited for use on Great Bear Lake and used to support its silver prospecting 1932–1933. Built by Captain J. Matheson in Edmonton.
	Cally		A motor schooner wrecked at Anderson River during a storm in September 1944.
	Canadusa	1919	Gas boat (16.6 m (54.5 ft) long, 3.4 m (11 ft) wide, 1.1 m (3.6 ft) draft) operated by Alberta Arctic Transportation Company in 1921, followed by the Hudson's Bay Company (1924 – c. 1932) on the Athabasca River and lower Peace River, and on Lake Athabasca to Fond du Lac.
	Cameron Bay		Motor boat used by the Royal Canadian Mounted Police at its post at Cameron Bay/Port Radium on Great Bear Lake in 1935.
	Cariboo	1902	Steamboat built by Bill Connor at Fort Smith and launched in 1902. It was purchased by free-traders Hislop & Nagle in 1903 and used to supply its trading posts along the Slave/Mackenzie Rivers and Great Slave Lake. Northern Traders Company purchased all Hislop & Nagle assets in 1911. The Cariboo was eventually replaced by Northern Trader's smaller more efficient schooner Speed. The old boat was derelict at Nagle Snye (former shipyard for Hislop & Nagle) outside of Fort Resolution in 1927.
	Caribou	1930	Originally the Medico (12 m (38 ft) long, 3.7 m (12 ft) wide, 50 hp (37 kW) Kermath engine). In 1946, after extensive repairs in Fort Smith, it was renamed the Caribou and during 1947-1948 was used by the government game warden on Great Slave Lake and the Slave River with home port of Fort Resolution. During 1952-1957 it was being used by the Game Warden in Aklavik, Mackenzie River delta and between Fort Good Hope and Tuktoyaktuk.
	Cecilia		Fish packer owned by Alaska Fisheries on Great Slave Lake c. 1962/1963.
	Cheyenne	1881	An HBC sidewheeler
	Clearwater	1943	Diesel tug (24 m (80 ft) long, 6.1 m (20 ft) wide, 1.5 m (5 ft) draft, 270 bhp (200 kW) engine) owned by the Northern Transportation Company Limited on the Athabasca and Slave Rivers in northern Alberta, 1946–1956. On August 26, 1956, the vessel sank on Lake Athabasca killing eight crew members. The Clearwater was later salvaged and renamed the Horn River. It may have originally been a United States Army tug boat used on the Mackenzie River during construction of the Canol pipeline c. 1944, carrying the designation RT-903.
	Coregonus		Motor boat used by Department of Fisheries patrols on Great Slave Lake 1945–1955, with home port of Hay River.
	Cross Fox	1937	Diesel tug (18 m (58 ft) long, 3.2 m (10.5 ft) wide, 1.1 m (3.6 ft) draft) owned by the Hudson's Bay Company on the Athabasca and Slave Rivers in northern Alberta, 1937 – c. 1946. In 1958, it was owned by McInnes Products Corporation and was probably used as a fish packer vessel on Lake Athabasca.
	D.A. Thomas	1916	Steam-driven sternwheeler (57 m (187 ft) long, 11 m (37 ft) beam, 300-ton cargo, 300 passenger) built for Peace River Development in 1916 to operate on the Peace River above the Vermilion Chutes. Sold to Lamson & Hubbard Trading Company in 1920, then to Alberta Arctic Transportation in 1921 and finally to the HBC in 1924. The shipped was badly damaged while trying to run the Vermilion Chutes on the Peace River and scrapped in 1930. It was one of the larger paddle wheeler steamships to ply in the Mackenzie watershed.
	Dease Lake	1934	Diesel tug (25 m (81 ft) long, 6.1 m (20 ft) wide, 1.8 m (5.8 ft) draft, 72 hp (54 kW) Fairbanks-Morse engine) launched at Fort Smith in 1934 and owned by the Hudson's Bay Company for use on the Slave/Mackenzie Rivers/Great Slave Lake. Sister ship was the Hearne Lake. In 1950–1961, it was owned by McInnes Products Corporation and used as part of a commercial fisheries fleet on Great Slave Lake. In 1963 it was renamed the Arctic Lady and owned by Yellowknife Transport Limited and later Robert Harcourt. See Arctic Lady. It operated as a luxury tour boat for approximately 5 years and then sold to Menzies Fisheries as a fish cleaning station, first at Dawson Landing, Marnine Point and finally, in 1969, at Moose Bay on the North Arm of Great Slave Lake, where it was abandoned. Ruins of the boat are still visible today in Moose Bay.
Delta Eagle tug boat 2018	Delta Eagle	1973	Diesel tug (19 m (61 ft) long, 365 hp (272 kW)) originally owned by Eagle Industries Limited, and later Delta North Transportation (1993), A Frame Contracting in Fort McMurray (1995-2003), Beaufort Oilfield Services in Tuktoyaktuk (2004), and ITB Marine Group (2012-2017). It was observed in the winter of 2018 dry docked in Inuvik, NWT.
	Delta Transporter	1970	Originally called the Takla Transporter when launched in 1970. In 1974, it was dismantled and moved by truck to Hay River and rebuilt by the Arctic Navigation Company, and renamed the Delta Transporter in 1975. In the NWT, it was in service as a dredge tender for oil and gas exploration in the Beaufort Sea/Mackenzie Delta until 1982 when it was sold. It was renamed the Inlet Transporter in 1986 and is now in service outside of the Northwest Territories.
	Diana H		Fishing boat owned by Carter Fisheries c. 1961 – c. 1963 on Great Slave Lake, home port of Hay River.
	Distributor	1920	Steam-driven sternwheeler (54 m (176 ft) long, 9.1 m (30 ft) beam, 200 ton cargo, 250 passengers) placed in service in 1920 by the Lamson & Hubbard Trading Company, acquired by the Alberta Arctic Transportation Co. in 1921, and the Hudson's Bay Company in 1924. Operated on the Slave-Mackenzie River network, below Fort Smith on the Slave River, in the 1920s–1940s. Converted to oil in 1944. Decommissioned in 1946. Scrapped in the 1950s.
	CCGS Dumit	1958	Canadian Coast Guard vessel operated by the Department of Transport on Great Slave Lake beginning in 1958. It was replaced with a new vessel called Dumit in 1979, and this vessel renamed the Hay River I. At the end of the 1979 season, the boat was dry docked in Fort Providence awaiting a decision on whether to surplus or sell.
	CCGS Dumit	1979	Built by Allied Shipbuilders in Vancouver in 1979. It was a Canadian Coast Guard vessel (49 m (160 ft) long, 12 m (40 ft) wide, 1.2 m (4 ft) draft, two Caterpillar D399 engines) operated by the Department of Transport on the Mackenzie River and Great Slave Lake beginning in 1979, replacing the original Dumit.
	CCGS Eckaloo	1961	Canadian Coast Guard vessel built by Allied Shipbuilders in 1961 at Fort Smith on the Slave River. The Department of Transport used it for coast guard activities and Aids to Navigation from Great Slave Lake and up the Mackenzie River. Rebuilt in 1967. It was replaced by a new Eckaloo vessel in 1988, and renamed the Hay River II, and then the Arctic Duchess in 1995 at which time it was owned by the Department of Fisheries. It was sold to RTL in 2001 and again in 2014 to a private owner in Yellowknife, where it is currently (2020) being used as a living quarters on Yellowknife Bay south of Jolliffe Island.
	CCGS Eckaloo	1988	Canadian Coast Guard vessel launched in 1988 replacing the original Eckaloo.
	Edjack		Tug boat (13 m (42 ft) long, 3.7 m (12 ft) wide, 1.8 m (6 ft) draft, 130 hp (97 kW)) originally owned by the United States Army at Fort Smith on the Slave River in the early 1940s. It was not used much due to the deep draft and was put up for sale in 1945. It may have been purchased at that time by Robert Porritt, who also had a boat called Edjack. Porritt's boat operated on Great Slave Lake, used for hauling lumber to Yellowknife and other communities around Great Slave Lake/Mackenzie River from his sawmill on the Slave River c. 1940s
	Edgar Kotokak	1973	Diesel tugboat (45 m (148 ft) long, 16 m (52 ft) beam, 1.14 m (3 ft 9 in) draft, 4,500 hp (3,400 kW)) launched by the Northern Transportation Company Limited in 1973 for use in the Western Arctic of the NWT. Originally called the Johnny Hope in 1973, it was renamed the Edgar Kotokak in 1995.
	Edwin Lindberg	1973	A diesel tug boat (31 m (102 ft) long, 12 m (38 ft) beam) launched in 1973 at Hay River by the Arctic Navigation Company for use on the Mackenzie River and Beaufort Sea. Sold to Arctic Transportation Ltd in 1978 and renamed "Arctic Kugaluk". All the assets of ATL were purchased by NTCL about 1983 and subsequently by the GNWT in 2017. It is currently dry docked in Hay River, NWT.
	Egaluppik (MV)		A diesel tug (12 m (40 ft) long, 4.0 m (13 ft) beam, 1.2 m (4 ft) draft) owned by the Government of the NWT in Inuvik in 1970.
	Eldora		Pleasure craft used by employees of the Port Radium uranium mine on Great Slave Lake c. 1939 – c. 1947.
	Ell-Too (MV)		Diesel tug owned by Yellowknife Transportation Company on the Mackenzie River c. 1946.
	Enterprise		Steamboat (15 m (50 ft) long) owned by Bill Connor, free trader, on Athabasca River c. 1898. He successfully floated the boat over the rapids on the Slave River (after removing the boiler and portaging it over the rapids) and was using it on Great Slave Lake that summer.
	Ethel		Steamlaunch used by prospectors on Great Slave Lake in 1899 and then sold to J.S. Camsell. Dr. Robert Bell of the Geological Survey of Canada was using the boat during his mineral examinations around the lake in 1899.
	Eva Nagle	1900	(originally the Sparrow). Purchased in 1898 by Hislop & Nagle free traders, and renamed the Eva Nagle. They moved it down the Slave River for use on Great Slave Lake and the Mackenzie River, relaunching it in 1900 when it travelled as far north as Fort Good Hope. Northern Traders Company purchased all Hislop & Nagle assets in 1911.
	Evelyn		Gas schooner owned by fur trader Jim Darwish on Great Slave Lake c. 1929–1932, home port Fort Rae (Behchokǫ̀). It was wrecked at Gypsum Point on Great Slave Lake in September 1932.
	Expeditor		See Yellowknife Expeditor
	Fond du Lac	1923	Gas schooner (12 m (41 ft) long, 2.7 m (9 ft) wide, 1.2 m (4 ft) draft) launched at Fort McMurray in 1923, used by the Hudson's Bay Company on Lake Athabasca in 1923–1931.
	Fort Hearne	1948	Freighting vessel owned by the Hudson's Bay Company and used to supply its post in the western Arctic Ocean of the Northwest Territories from 1948 to 1961 when it was damaged by ice.
	Fort James	1923	Freighting vessel owned by the Hudson's Bay Company and used to supply its post in the western Arctic Ocean of the Northwest Territories from 1923 to 1937 when it was crushed by ice. Originally called the Jean Revillon, renamed the Fort James in 1931.
	Fort McMurray	1916	Steam-driven sternwheeler (100 ton cargo, 40 passengers) built at Fort McMurray and launched in 1916 to operate between Fort McMurray and Fort Fitzgerald on the Athabasca River by the Hudson's Bay Company. Out of service by 1921.
	Fort McPherson		Schooner used by the Hudson's Bay Company at Herschel Island in the western Arctic Ocean from 1915 into the 1920s.
	Fort Rae		Schooner used on Great Slave Lake c.1921-1923 by the Hudson's Bay Company, and possibly, under charter, by the RCMP. In 1921, the Fort Rae was being used by the government agent in charge of signing Treaty 11 with various Dene bands on Great Slave Lake. It may have been built by the Alberta Motor Boat Company in Edmonton, Alberta.
	Fort Reliance		RCMP schooner used on Great Slave Lake c. 1928
	Fort Ross	1938	Freighting vessel (35 m (114 ft) long, 8.5 m (28 ft) beam) owned by the Hudson's Bay Company and used to supply its post in the western Arctic Ocean of the Northwest Territories from 1938 to 1950. In 1958, it was on an exploratory fishing voyage in the north Pacific Ocean for the Fisheries Research Board.
	Frank Broderick	1965	Diesel tugboat (85 m (280 ft) long, 13 m (42 ft) beam, 250 mm (10 in) draft, 2,880 hp (2,150 kW)) launched by the Northern Transportation Company Limited for use in the western Arctic Ocean of the NWT. It was based in Tuktoyaktuk. NTCL sold it in 1995.
	George Askew	1945	Steam-powered sternwheeler (27 m (87 ft) long, 6.4 m (21 ft) wide, 1.2 m (4 ft) draft, 135 hp (101 kW) engine) owned by the Northern Transportation Company Limited on the Slave River-Mackenzie River routes 1945–1958. In 1966, the boat was beached in Norman Wells and being used as NTCL crew quarters. The Inuvik Chamber of Commerce was interested in preserving the boat as a monument at that time.
	Golden Hind		Schooner owned by Harry Harrison at Aklavik, Mackenzie Delta c. 1940 – c. 1956.
	SS Grahame	1883	Steam-driven sternwheeler (40 m (130 ft) long, 7.3 m (24 ft) beam, 450 ton cargo) operated by the Hudson's Bay Company, launched in 1883 by Captain J.M. Smith, operating from Fort McMurray to Fort Fitzgerald on the Athabasca and Slave Rivers.
	Grandy	1943	Diesel tug (11 m (36 ft) long, 3.0 m (10 ft) wide, 1.2 m (4 ft) draft) owned by Yellowknife Transportation Company on Great Slave Lake c. 1962/1963. Originally the Marjory H in the United States, sold to Yellowknife Transportation Company and rebuilt in 1953; renamed the Grandy II in 1955 and the YT Grandy in 1957. It was later owned by the Northern Transportation Company Limited in Hay River.
	Great Bear	1934	Diesel freighter (27 m (90 ft) long, 240 bhp (180 kW), 135 ton capacity) used by the Northern Transportation Company Limited on Great Bear Lake from 1934 to 1960 when it was retired.
	Grenfell	1912	Built for service on the upper Peace River, by the Peace River Trading and Land Company. It was accidentally destroyed by fire in September 1914.
	GSI Mariner	1971	A research/survey ship, built and used originally by Geophysical Service. Beached on the banks of the Mackenzie River south of Inuvik, near the beginning of the Tuktoyaktuk Winter Road.
	Guy	1933	Diesel boat (14 m (47 ft) long, 3.8 m (12.5 ft) wide, 1.6 m (5.4 ft) draft, 75 hp (56 kW) screw propulsion engine in 1933) owned by the Catholic Mission in Fort Resolution (1933-1941). In 1941, when the boat was replaced with the Sant Anna, it was being captained by Catholic brother Kerautret. The Guy was then owned by sawmill operator A.J. McDonald (c. 1944), followed by the Sheck Brothers (c. 1945), and finally Charles Sanders (c. 1950s-60s) on Great Slave Lake based out of Yellowknife. The hull was derelict on Jolliffe Island at Yellowknife and destroyed by fire in the 1970s.
	Guy		Roman Catholic Mission boat on the Mackenzie River c. 1961.
	Hay River I	1958	Originally the CCGS Dumit and renamed the Hay River I in 1979 with the launching of the new CCGS Dumit. It was then sold, owned by the Government of the Northwest Territories until 2004, and then 851791 NWT Ltd. in Hay River in 2012.
	Hay River II	1961	Originally the CCGS Eckaloo and renamed the Hay River II in 1988 with the launching of the new CCGS Eckaloo. Renamed the Arctic Duchess in 1995 at which time it was owned by the Department of Fisheries. It was sold to RTL in 2001 and again in 2014 to a private owner in Yellowknife, where it is currently (2017) being used as a living quarters on Yellowknife Bay.
	Hearne Channel		Diesel tug boat operated by David Smith on Great Slave Lake with home port in Yellowknife, 1976– 2000s. Frequently used for freighting on the lake's East Arm to mining projects and the communities like Łutselk'e. It was first advertised for service in June 1976: "This 46 feet vessel is now available for custom charter work on Great Slave Lake. The Hearne Channel has a steel hull which can haul up to 20,000 pounds. She is comfortably outfitted to accommodate small groups for naturalist tours, wilderness cruises and parties. We have tents, camping gear, smaller boats and if you like dancing under the midnight sun, we have a generator for the stereo."
	Hearne Lake	1934	Diesel tug (72 hp (54 kW) Fairbanks-Morse engine) launched at Fort Smith in 1934 and owned by the Hudson's Bay Company for use on Great Bear Lake. Sister ship was the Dease Lake. It was later used on the Slave/Mackenzie Rivers/Great Slave Lake routes, and was still in service in 1956.
	Henry Christoffersen	1973	Diesel tugboat (45.3 m (148.5 ft) long, 16 m (52 ft) beam, 1.14 m (3 ft 9 in) draft, 4,500 hp (3,400 kW)) built at Burrard Yarrows, launched by the Northern Transportation Company Limited in 1973 for use in the Western Arctic of the NWT. Still in use 2013.
	Herschel I	1930	See the Aklavik I
	Herschel	1926	Originally the Lethbridge, an RCMP patrol boat in Aklavik, NWT. In 1933 it was renamed the Herschel and moved to Coppermine. In the summer of 1943, while engaged on a patrol in the vicinity of Reid Island, she was damaged beyond repair by drifting on a rocky ledge during the course of a gale. The hull was surplused and sold in 1945.
	Herschel Island		Schooner used by the Royal Canadian Mounted Police at Herschel Island starting in 1956.
Horn River at Hay River shipyards 2013	Horn River	1943	This vessel (24 m (80 ft) long, 6.1 m (20 ft) beam, 0.81 m (2 ft 8 in) draft, 460 hp (340 kW)) was the retrofitted Clearwater diesel tug that sank on Lake Athabasca in 1956 and then salvaged. It was rebuilt for service on the Mackenzie River by the Northern Transportation Company Limited after 1956. In 2013 it was observed dry docked at the NTCL shipyards in Hay River. In 2019 it is owned by the Government of the Northwest Territories, dry docked in Hay River shipyards, and scheduled for scrapping as it is no longer seaworthy.
	Hudson's Hope	1920	A steam-driven sternwheeler relaunched in 1920 on the Peace River, originally the Northland Call. Operated by Peace River Development from 1920 to 1924 when it was scrapped.
	Hubaco	1917	Gas boat (11 m (35 ft) long, 2.3 m (7.5 ft) wide, 0.82 m (2.7 ft) draft) owned by the Hudson's Bay Company c. 1921–1939 on the Mackenzie River/Great Slave Lake routes. In 1921, the Hubaco was being rented from the HBC by the government agent in charge of signing Treaty 11 with various Dene bands up the Mackenzie River. In 1931 it was still registered as being owned by the HBC.
	Hudson Hope	1915	see Northland Call II
	Hugh A. Young	1962	A survey vessel (27 m (87 ft) long, 7.9 m (26 ft) beam, 1.07 m (3 ft 6 in) draft) built in 1961 by Allied Shipbuilders in Vancouver, and transported by rail to Waterways in the summer of 1962. It then travelled down the Athabasca/Slave Rivers, over the portage at Fort Smith, and commissioned at Hay River for the use of Department of Public Works on Great Slave Lake/Mackenzie River. In the 1980s it was assisting with dredge work at Tuktoyaktuk. The vessel was dry docked and ready for sale in 1991. It was retrofitted and put back to use during remediation of several old mine sites on Great Slave Lake in 1994. In 2003, it was owned by Cooper Barging Services in Fort Nelson, BC. Docked at Cooper Barging's landing in Fort Simpson as of 2021.
	Husky	1959	Diesel tug (37 m (121 ft) long, 9.1 m (30 ft) beam, 1.5 m (5 ft) draft, 2,880 hp (2,150 kW)) launched by the Yellowknife Transportation Company in 1959 for use on the Great Slave Lake/Mackenzie River routes. AKA YT Husky. It was the flagship of the YTCL. Sold to Northern Transportation Company Limited in 1965 and renamed NT Husky. Decommissioned in Hay River. In 2019 it is owned by the Government of the Northwest Territories, dry docked in Hay River shipyards, and scheduled for scrapping as it is no longer seaworthy.
	Immaculata	1928 or 1935	Roman Catholic mission boat (11.7 m (38.5 ft) long, 3.4 m (11 ft) wide, 1.2 m (4 ft) draft, 40 hp (30 kW) gas engine) based in Fort Resolution for use on Great Slave Lake/Mackenzie River/to the Arctic Ocean, 1935– c.1962. In 1962, it was hauling lumber from a sawmill near Fort Simpson to Fort Resolution. The hull was later abandoned at Sawmill Channel near Fort Resolution where it can still be seen today (2017). A boat with the same name was operated by the Catholic Mission out of Fort Resolution in 1928, so it is possible the Immaculata was built in 1928 or 1935.
	Inconnu	1962	Motor boat (12 m (39 ft) long, 3.7 m (12 ft) beam, 1.68 m (5 ft 6 in) draft) used by Government of Canada on Great Slave Lake and Slave River starting in 1962 with home port in Fort Smith, Slave River. It was used by the game warden and other federal officials in management and patrols of the Slave River and Great Slave Lake areas. Captained by Billy McNeill in 1962. In 1965, the boat was reported sunk following a heavy rainstorm while operating near Inuvik.
	Investigator	1945	Motor boat built by the Alberta Motor Boat Company in 1945 and used by the Government Fisheries Research on Great Slave Lake from 1945 to 1948 when it was transferred to Lake Winnipeg.
	Jock McNiven	1974	Diesel tugboat (45 m (148 ft) long, 16 m (52 ft) beam, 1.14 m (3 ft 9 in) draft, 4,500 hp (3,400 kW)) launched by the Northern Transportation Company Limited in 1974 for use on the Mackenzie River. Later owned by the Government of the Northwest Territories Department of Public Works. Named for Jock McNiven.
	Johnny B	1956	Diesel-powered tug boat launched in 1956 for us on Lake Athabasca by Gunnar Mines Limited, who operated Gunnar Mine near Uranium City, Saskatchewan.
	Johnny Berens	1961	Diesel-powered ferry built in Hay River in the winter of 1960/1961, and launched on July 20, 1961, as a ferry crossing the Mackenzie River. It was replaced by the ferry Merv Hardie in 1972. It is now used as a ferry crossing the Mackenzie River on the highway between Fort Simpson and Wrigley.
	Johnny Hope	1973	Diesel tugboat (45 m (148 ft) long, 16 m (52 ft) beam, 1.14 m (3 ft 9 in) draft, 4,500 hp (3,400 kW)) launched by the Northern Transportation Company Limited in 1973 for use in the Western Arctic of the NWT. Renamed the Edgar Kotokak in 1995.
	J.R. White	1945	Landing craft converted into motor vessel (15.5 m (50.9 ft) long, built in 1945 as a landing craft. Renamed the MV Snare and used as a temporary ferry on the Mackenzie River highway crossing in 1960. Purchased by Canadian National Telecommunications and used on the Mackenzie River from 1962 to 1966 in the construction of the Mackenzie Valley telephone line from Hay River to Inuvik. CNT listed the ship for sale in August 1966 upon completion of the project.
	Kakisa	1973	Diesel tugboat (25 m (83 ft) long, 11 m (35 ft) beam, 76 mm (3 in) draft, 1,450 hp (1,080 kW)) launched by the Northern Transportation Company Limited in 1973 for use on the Mackenzie River with home port of Hay River. Later purchased by the Government of the Northwest Territories, Department of Public Works.
	Kay Tee		A fishpacker owned by Kucher and Trefiak, commercial fishers, on Great Slave Lake c. 1961 – c. 1963. AKA Kaytee. Now derelict in Hay River.
	Keewatin	1974	Diesel tugboat (38 m (126 ft) long, 12 m (38 ft) beam, 1.98 m (6 ft 6 in) draft, 3,370 hp (2,510 kW)), built by Yarrows in Esquimalt, launched by the Northern Transportation Company Limited in 1974 for use in the Western Arctic of the NWT. In 2017 it was owned by R.J.G. Construction in St. John's, Newfoundland and Labrador.
	Kelly Hall	1969	Diesel tugboat (49 m (160 ft) long, 12 m (40 ft) beam, 1.68 m (5 ft 6 in) draft, 4,300 hp (3,200 kW)) launched by the Northern Transportation Company Limited in 1969 for use in the Western Arctic of the NWT. Renamed the Pisurayak Kootook in 1995 after David Pisurayak Kootook.
	Kitikmeot	1969	Diesel tugboat (49 m (160 ft) long, 12 m (40 ft) beam, 1.68 m (5 ft 6 in) draft, 4,300 hp (3,200 kW)) launched by the Northern Transportation Company Limited in 1969 for use in the Western Arctic of the NWT. Originally called the Angus Sherwood in 1969, renamed the Kitikmeot, and then the Pat Lyall in 2006. Operated in the western and eastern Arctic Ocean.
	Knut Lang	1969	Diesel tugboat (51 m (168 ft) long, 15 m (48 ft) beam, 1.68 m (5 ft 6 in) draft, 4,300 hp (3,200 kW)) launched by the Northern Transportation Company Limited in 1969 for use in the Western Arctic of the NWT. Renamed the Nunakput in 1994.
	Lady Mackworth	1916	Gas motor vessel (17 m (57 ft) long, 3.4 m (11 ft) wide, 1.1 m (3.7 ft) draft) built by the Lamson & Hubbard Trading Company and acquired by the Alberta Arctic Transportation Co. in 1921 to operate on the Mackenzie and Liard River network. Acquired by the Hudson's Bay Company in 1924. Broken up in 1930.
	Landa	1954	Commercial fishing vessel (17 m (57 ft) long) on Great Slave Lake c. 1961–c. 1972, home port of Hay River. Owned by Alaska Fisheries Ltd. in the 1960s-1970s.
	Lethbridge	1926	Gas-powered patrol boat (9.8 m (32 ft) long, 2.7 m (9 ft) wide) for the RCMP at Aklavik in 1926. Built by the Alberta Motor Boat Company in Edmonton. In 1933 it was renamed the Herschel and moved to Coppermine. In the summer of 1943, while engaged on a patrol in the vicinity of Reid Island, off of Victoria Island, she was damaged beyond repair by drifting on a rocky ledge during the course of a gale. The hull was surplused and sold in 1945.
	Liard	1919	Paddlewheeler (24 m (80 ft) long, 4.9 m (16 ft) beam) launched in 1919 at Fort Smith to operate from Fort Simpson up the Liard River to service Hudson's Bay Company posts. It was wrecked on the Nelson River in October 1922.
	Liard River	1923	Gas motor vessel launched in 1923 by the Hudson's Bay Company to operate on the Slave/Mackenzie/Liard Rivers. Built by Captain John Mathieson. It was moved to Great Bear Lake in 1932. The boat was still operating in 1946 by which time it was again operating on the Slave/Mackenzie River routes. In 1950 it was sold to McInnes Fish Products commercial fishers on Great Slave Lake. In 1962 the boat was purchased by Arctic Circle Shipping (a subsidiary of Yellowknife Transportation Ltd) and retrofitted as a tourism cruise vessel for the Mackenzie River. In 1966, the boat was planned to be used to ferry tourists between Yellowknife and the Frontier Fishing Tours camp near Snowdrift (Lutselk'e) on Great Slave Lake. In 1966, the boat was purchased by Rudy Steiner of Terrex Explorations for use in mineral exploration along the Mackenzie River and Arctic Coast. After Mr. Steiner's death around 1973, it was donated to the Hay River tourist centre for potential display. The ship was derelict in Hay River in the 1990s but has since been destroyed.
	Limnos		Motor boat used by Department of Fisheries patrols on Great Slave Lake 1945–1955, with home port of Hay River.
	Lister	1970	Diesel tugboat (22 m (72 ft) long, 7.0 m (23 ft) beam, 1.2 m (4 ft) draft, 680 hp (510 kW)), built by Lister's Welding in Edmonton, owned by the Northern Transportation Company Limited. In 2013 it was observed dry docked at the NTCL shipyards in Hay River. In 2019 it is owned by the Government of the Northwest Territories, dry docked in Hay River shipyards, and scheduled for scrapping as it is no longer seaworthy.
	Little Chief	1937	Diesel tugboat (15 m (50 ft) long, 4.3 m (14 ft) wide, 1.2 m (4 ft) draft) owned by Yellowknife Transportation Company on the Slave River/Great Slave Lake routes 1937 to c.1949. It was built in 1937 at Taylor Flats, British Columbia on the Peace River under a crew in charge of Bert Neiland, owner of Yellowknife Transportation Company. That first summer, the Little Chief and its barge made supply runs to Fort Nelson on the Liard River, Norman Wells, and was winched over the Great Bear River rapids to get to Port Radium on Great Bear Lake and transport out a shipment of uranium ore.
	Mabel		Boat used by Northern Waterways Limited (1932) and then Northern Transportation Company Limited (1934 – c. 1943) on the Athabasca/Slave River route. In the summer of 1934 the Mabel was operating between Waterways and Fort Fitzgerald with three barges carrying 250 tons of freight per week.
	Mackenzie River	1908	Steelframe steam-driven sternwheeler (38 m (125 ft) long, 115 ton cargo, 40 passengers) built at Fort Smith and launched in 1908 by Captain J.W. Mills operating on Great Slave Lake in the 1920s by the Hudson's Bay Company. It was mothballed by the HBC in 1923 but re-entered service during 1929/1930. In the 1940s it was commissioned for use during the Canol oil project along the Mackenzie River but was no longer being operated in 1947. In 1953 the retrofitted hulk was being used as living quarters and warehousing for commercial fisherman at Gros Cap on Great Slave Lake. The following year it ran aground at Hay River and was renovated into a fish processing barge for the fisheries there.
	Macleod		Motor boat used by the Royal Canadian Mounted Police at Fort Norman c. 1921.
	Malta		Tug boat used by Department of Public Works at Hay River to assist with dredging operations c. 1962/1963.
	Malta II	1947	Diesel tug boat (20 m (64 ft) long) owned by Cameron Cooper operating on the Liard River-based out of Fort Liard. Drydocked at Cooper Barging's landing in Fort Liard as of 2021
	Margaret A (MS)	1928	Schooner used by the Hudson's Bay Company c. 1934 – 1940 in the Western Arctic to Tuktoyaktuk, and later on the Mackenzie River and Great Slave Lake c.1941. Still owned by the HBC in 1954.
	Margaret A		Diesel tug used by the Yellowknife Transportation Company on the Mackenzie River/Great Slave Lake routes c.1961.
	Mareca	1951	Motor boat (10.0 m (32.7 ft) long, 3.4 m (11 ft) wide, 0.76 m (2.5 ft) draft) used by Department of Fisheries patrols on Great Slave Lake from 1951 to 1962, with home port of Hay River. From 1967 to 1979 it was owned by Charles Gordon in Aklavik, NWT under the name Theanne.
	Marila (MV)	1955	Motor boat (13.0 m (42.5 ft) long, 3.7 m (12 ft) wide, 0.76 m (2.5 ft) draft, 175 bhp (130 kW) diesel engine) used by Department of Fisheries patrols on Great Slave Lake 1955–1986, with home port of Hay River. In 1987–1995, it was owned by Robert Steen in Tuktoyaktuk and later sold to interests in British Columbia.
	Marjorie B		Diesel tug used by the Yellowknife Transportation Company on the Mackenzie River/Great Slave Lake routes c. 1946
	Marjory H	1943	Diesel tug built in 1943 in Seattle, Washington. Rebuilt at Hay River, NWT in 1953 by the Yellowknife Transportation Company (11 m (36 ft) long, 3.0 m (10 ft) wide, 1.2 m (4 ft) draft), and renamed the Grandy II in 1955, followed by the YT Grandy in 1957.
	Marjorie H	1956	Diesel tug (1,000 hp (750 kW)), built in Victoria used by the Yellowknife Transportation Company on the Mackenzie River/Great Slave Lake routes 1956–1965. Also known as the YT Marjory. Acquired by the Northern Transportation Company Limited in 1965 and renamed NT Marjory. The NT Marjory was rebuilt in 1973 and given new engines in 2001.
	Matt Berry	1974	Diesel tugboat (45 m (148 ft) long, 16 m (52 ft) beam, 1.14 m (3 ft 9 in) draft, 4,500 hp (3,400 kW)) launched by the Northern Transportation Company Limited in 1974 for use in the Western Arctic of the NWT. Later owned by the Government of the Northwest Territories Department of Public Works. Renamed the Kelly Ovayuak in 2011.
	McKinnon		Gas boat owned by the Hudson's Bay Company on the Slave/Mackenzie River routes c. 1946.
	McQuesten	1971	Ferry used at the Liard River crossing to Fort Simpson in the 1970s. Now retired and privately owned in Yellowknife.
	Medico	1930	Motor boat 12 m (38 ft) long, 3.7 m (12 ft) wide, 35-50 hp (37 kW) Kermath engine) used by Government of Canada in the Mackenzie Delta of the Northwest Territories. It was built in 1930 by Alberta Motor Boat Company in Edmonton. It was initially used by Dr. James Urquhart as a patrol hospital ship at Aklavik, who made visits to outlying communities with it including Herschel Island. The boat was condemned in 1944 and restored in 1945 at Fort Smith with a new engine and hull repairs. It was renamed the Caribou in 1946 and used by the game warden at Fort Smith from 1946 to 1952. See Caribou.
	Merv Hardie	1972	Diesel-powered ferry built and launched in 1972 as a ferry crossing the Mackenzie River near Fort Providence. Named for Merv Hardie it was decommissioned in 2012 with the completion of the Deh Cho Bridge.
	Messenger	1897	Steamboat (10 m (33 ft) long, 2.1 m (7 ft) beam, screw propeller) operated by the Hudson's Bay Company on the Peace River from 1905 to 1914.
	Messenger		Church mission boat used in the Aklavik area c. 1933 – c. 1940
	Midnight Sun	1904	Built in 1904 by Northern Traders Company. Operated on the Lesser Slave Lake and Lesser Slave River.
	Miller Delta	1974	Diesel tug boat (21 m (70 ft) long, 7.6 m (25 ft) beam, 1.37 m (4 ft 6 in) draft, twin 725 hp (541 kW) engines) owned by Mike Cooper operating on the Mackenzie River-based out of Fort Simpson in the early 2000s. Built by Allied Shipbuilders in 1974, purchased by Cooper Barging Services in 1997. Currently operating for Cooper Barging still based out of Fort Simpson as of 2021.
The 1958 Miskanaw coast guard ship	Miskanaw (CCGS)	1958	Canadian Coast Guard vessel operated by the Department of Transport on Mackenzie River beginning in 1958. In 1965-1980s, it was operating on the Slave/Athabasca River system in northern Alberta. Decommissioned and owned by the Fort McMurray Historical Society in 2003.
	Miss Norman	1921	Diesel tugboat (9.3 m (30.5 ft) long) built by Russ Denholm in Waterways, Alberta, for use carrying oil drilling equipment and supplies between Fort Norman and Fort Smith on the Mackenzie/Slave River routes. In 1931, she was owned by Northern Traders Ltd.
	Molly Hogan		Diesel tugboat used by the Northern Transportation Company Limited on the Slave River/Great Slave Lake routes c. 1935/1936.
	Moose	1947	Boat built in 1947 by Cliff Richardon Boat Works for use of the government game warden in Fort Good Hope to Aklavik, but appears to have been used on Great Slave Lake to Fort Simpson the Mackenzie River in the 1947 season. In 1948 the Moose was transferred to Reindeer Station and still being used there in 1952 transporting personnel and freight between Aklavik and Reindeer Station.
	Nahidik (CCGS)	1974	Canadian Coast Guard vessel (53.4 m (175 ft) long, 15.3 m (50 ft) breadth, 2 m (6 ft 7 in) draft) on Great Slave Lake and up the Mackenzie River to the Beaufort Sea. Launched in 1974, decommissioned and sold in 2011 to the Northern Transportation Company Limited in Hay River. In 2016 the vessel was acquired by the Government of the Northwest Territories following the bankruptcy of NTCL. It was relaunched under lease to Arctic Research Foundation in September–October 2019 as a survey vessel on Great Slave Lake's east arm. The vessel will be renamed soon.
	Nancy D	1942	A motor boat (15 m (48 ft) long, 3.7 m (12 ft) beam, 1.5 m (5 ft) draft, 125 hp (93 kW)) owned by the United States Army at Fort Smith, built in 1942 but not used very much due to its deep draft. It was put up for sale in 1943-1945 by Imperial Oil at which time the boat was at Fort Fitzgerald on the Slave River.
	Nanook (MV)		Boat owned by Imperial Oil at Norman Wells on the Mackenzie River during the early 1940s and put up for sale in 1946.
	Nanook		Schooner owned by Charlie Gruben of Aklavik in 1956, purchased used from the Government of Canada.
	Nanook II (MV)		Motor schooner (15 m (48 ft) long, 3.4 m (11 ft) beam, 1.2 m (4 ft) draft)used by the Government of Canada in the 1940s–1968 in the Mackenzie Delta with service between Aklavik, Inuvik and Reindeer Station. It was also used by game and forest wardens in that area. In the 1970s it was sold to the community of Délı̨nę on Great Bear Lake where it was abandoned and later (c. 1981) destroyed by arson. AKA Nanuk.
	Nanoon (MV)		Boat owned by Imperial Oil at Norman Wells on the Mackenzie River during the early 1940s. After the war, it was offered for sale and purchased by the government in 1947 and renamed Spruce. See Spruce (MB).
	Netchilik		Boat captained by Johnny Norberg in the Aklavik/Inuvik area 1956, used for freighting on the Distant Early Warning Line construction. In 1957, it was caught in ice and badly damaged near Paulatuk and the wreck is now on the beach near Clifton Point, NWT. AKA Nitchilik, or Natsilik?
	Niangua	1942	Transport vessel (12 m (39 ft) long, 3.4 m (11 ft) wide, 1.7 m (5.5 ft) draft) originally owned by the United States Army in 1942, later used by Eldorado Mining & Refining on Great Bear Lake to transport freight and personnel between its uranium mine at Port Radium and airstrip at Sawmill Bay c.1946. In 1953–1962, it was owned by Northern Transportation Company Limited and used as a yarding tug at Hay River shipyards.
	Nodaway (MV)	1942	Transport vessel (14.8 m (48.5 ft) long, 3.4 m (11 ft) wide, 1.4 m (4.5 ft) draft) originally owned by the US Army in 1942, later used by Yellowknife Transportation Company on the Mackenzie River routes c. 1946–1950. A boat by this name was still operating in 1962/1963 by the company, being used to assist with dredge work at Hay River on Great Slave Lake. In 1975-1985 it was owned by West Coast Salvage & Contracting Co. Ltd and in 2003-2009 by John R. Inglis of Fort Chipewyan.
	Nor-Alta	1929	Diesel tugboat (23.0 m (75.5 ft) long, 4.9 m (16 ft) wide, 2.3 m (7.5 ft) depth) used by McInnes Products Corporation, commercial fishers, on the Slave River/Great Slave Lake routes c. 1946–1961. It was their flagship vessel. In 1962, the ship was purchased by Carter Fisheries and used a fish packer on Great Slave Lake 1962-1963. The boat was damaged during the spring floods of 1963 and was left abandoned in the Hay River Channel and stripped of all valuable fixtures. To remove it as a navigable waterways hazard, the boat was finally torched by the Hay River fire department in July 1967.
	Nor-Basca	1930	Diesel tugboat (17 m (56 ft) long, 3.7 m (12 ft) wide, 1.2 m (4 ft) draft) used by McInnes Products Corporation, commercial fishers, on the Athabasca/Slave River routes 1930-c.1958.
	Norman		Diesel tugboat owned by the Northern Transportation Company Limited in the summer of 1934 with one 50-ton barge from Fort Norman up the Great Bear River to the foot of the rapids. From here, freight was transported to the Sternwheeler boat which continued between the next set of rapids on the Great Bear River.
	Northland Call	1910	Steam boat built in 1910 at Athabasca Landing by J.H. Woods and used by Northern Traders Company on the Athabasca/Lesser Slave Rivers until it was scrapped in 1913.
	Northland Call II	1915	Steam-driven sternwheeler, built in 1915 by George Magar at Peace River, operated by Peace River Navigation Company on the upper Peace River. Relaunched in 1920 as the Hudson's Hope on the Peace River.
	Northland Echo	1912	Steam-driven sternwheeler built in 1912 by Northern Traders Company, who thought its shallow draft would enable it to transit the who length of the Peace River. It only transited the Vermilion Chutes once, and only functioned until 1914. It may have been rebuilt (or a new ship of this name built) and operated by Northern Traders Company on the Athabasca and upper Slave Rivers between Fort McMurray and Fort Fitzgerald. Scrapped in 1923 and rebuilt as Northland Echo II.
	Northland Echo II	1923	Steam-driven sternwheeler (41 m (135 ft) long, 7.3 m (24 ft) beam) operated by Northern Traders Company on the Athabasca and upper Slave Rivers between Fort McMurray and Fort Fitzgerald from 1923 to 1928 and then by the Hudson's Bay Company from 1929 – 1946. Retired at Waterways in 1946. It was not used in the 1947 summer shipping season.
	Northland Pioneer	1921	Gas motor vessel (30 m (100 ft) long, 6.1 m (20 ft) beam, 90 tons cargo) launched in 1921 at Fort Smith, operated by Northern Traders Company on the Slave and Mackenzie Rivers and Great Slave Lake. It was the first crude oil burning boat used in the Northwest Territories. In September 1926, the Pioneer was badly damaged while proceeding down the Mackenzie River to Fort Norman when it struck a rock at Dory Point just above Fort Providence. The Pioneer struck hard, jamming the rudder and tearing away part of the keel, the starboard propeller, and the shaft. An attempt was made to continue navigation with the assistance of a smaller mission boat, and the Pioneer made it as far as Spence River to lay up for the winter when the engine back-fired and the boat caught fire. Drifting downstream, the Pioneer eventually beached on a sandbar and burned to the waterline.
	Northland Star (SS)	1911	Built in 1911 by Northern Traders Company. Operated on the Athabasca-Slave Rivers from Fort McMurray to Fort Fitzgerald.
	Northland Sun (SS)	1909	Built in 1909 by Northern Traders Company and operated on the Athabasca/Slave Rivers from Fort McMurray to Fort Fitzgerald. Abandoned in 1915.
	Northland Trader	1906	Steam ship (27 m (87 ft) long, 5.0 m (16.5 ft) wide, 3.7 m (12 ft) draft, screw propulsion). Originally called the St. Marie, built in 1906 and launched in 1907 by the Roman Catholic Mission at Fort Smith. The vessel was sold to the Northern Traders Company in 1912 and renamed the Northland Trader, and rebuilt in 1919 for passenger and freight service. It operated on the Slave River-Great Slave Lake network as far north as Aklavik. In October 1924 during a fall storm, the ship was wrecked on a beach while seeking shelter behind an island. All crew and passengers survived and were later rescued. The wreckage can still be seen today on Loutit Island near Fort Resolution.
	Northern Prospector	1934	A motor vessel used by the Northern Transportation Company Limited on the Slave/Great Slave Lake routes servicing the Yellowknife gold camp 1934-c. 1938. It was a derelict at Fort Resolution in 1946 and broken up.
	North Star		Schooner owned by A.W. Boland a free trader on Great Bear Lake c. 1928 - c. 1932, followed by the Northern Transportation Company Limited c. 1935. Also known as the Star?
	North Star of Herschel Island	1935	Schooner (18 m (58 ft) long, 4.6 m (15 ft) beam, 1.98 m (6 ft 6 in) draft, 30 tons tonnage) built in San Francisco in 1935/1936. It was owned by Fred Carpenter in the western Arctic Ocean near Herschel Island until 1960/1961. It was owned by Sven Johansson in 1967-1973 and used for Arctic scientific investigations. Purchased by Bruce Macdonald in 1996.
	Norweta (MS)	1971	A small cruise ship (30 m (99 ft) long) with 20-passenger capacity that operated on the Mackenzie River and the Beaufort Sea for many years. Original owners were Arctic Cruise Lines Ltd 1971–1980, followed by Arctic Offshore Ltd. 1982–1988, Pristine Tours 1989–1991, and George and Margaret Whitlock 1991–2009. The MS Norwetta was advertised for sale in January 2020.
	Our Lady of Lourdes	1930	Roman Catholic mission supply boat (17 m (56 ft) long, 5 m (16 ft) beam, 1.75 m (5 ft 9 in) draught) in the western Arctic Ocean, serving communities from Herschel Island in the Beaufort Sea, to Coppermine in the Coronation Gulf, 1930–1957. The construction of this schooner, flush-decked, sloop-rigged motor sailer, was overseen in San Francisco by Captain Christian Theodore Pedersen. Tuktoyaktuk became her home port in 1940. The vessel made its final journey in 1967 and was winched ashore at Tuktoyaktuk; since 1978, it has been on display near the community's Catholic church.
	Pat Lyall	1969	Diesel tugboat (49 m (160 ft) long, 12 m (40 ft) beam, 1.68 m (5 ft 6 in) draft, 4,300 hp (3,200 kW)) launched by the Northern Transportation Company Limited in 1969 for use in the Western Arctic of the NWT. Originally called the Angus Sherwood in 1969, renamed the Kitikmeot, and then the Pat Lyall in 2006. Operated in the western and eastern Arctic Ocean.
MV Slave and Peace	Peace (MV)	1942	Diesel tug (22.4 m (73.5 ft) long, 5.9 m (19.5 ft) wide, 1.5 m (5 ft) draft, 270 bhp (200 kW)) owned by the Northern Transportation Company Limited on the Slave/Mackenzie River routes c. 1946, and later on the Athabasca/Slave River routes c. 1950s. It may have originally been a United States Army tug boat used on the Mackenzie River during construction of the Canol pipeline c. 1944, carrying the designation RT-901. In 1999-2017 it was owned by Syncrude Canada at Fort McMurray.
	Peace River	1905	Steam-driven sternwheeler (34 m (110 ft) long, 7.3 m (24 ft) beam) built 1904/1905 at Fort Vermilion, Alberta and operated by the HBC on the upper Peace River from Vermilion Chutes to Hudson's Hope. Retired in 1915.
	Pelican		A boat owned by Phillip Lafferty-based out of Fort Rae on Great Slave Lake in 1946 and operating supply runs to Yellowknife.
	Pelican Rapids (MS)	1947	Diesel tug (30 m (98 ft) long, 8.5 m (28 ft) beam, 1.07 m (3 ft 6 in) draft, 929 hp (693 kW)), built by Standard Iron Works in Edmonton, used by the Hudson's Bay Company on the lower Slave River/Mackenzie River routes starting in 1947. It was acquired by the Northern Transportation Company Limited by 1956 and was still in service in 1973. It was later abandoned in Hay River Old Town, and by 2019 the rusting hulk had been cut up for scrap and removed.
	Pelly Lake	1930	Diesel tug (24 m (78 ft) long, 5.2 m (17 ft) beam, 1.7 m (5.5 ft) draft) owned by the Hudson's Bay Company on the Athabasca/Slave River routes (1930-c. 1933), on Great Slave Lake (c.1933), and back to the Athabasca/Slave River routes as far north as Fort Fitzgerald in c.1938-c.1946. New engines (330 hp (250 kW)) installed in 1957.
	Peter Pond	1929	Motor boat (12 m (41 ft) long, 3.7 m (12 ft) wide, 1.1 m (3.7 ft) draft) used by Government of Canada Indian Affairs agents and other government officials on Great Slave Lake 1929–1961, with home port in Fort Resolution. It was built in 1929 by the Alberta Motor Boat Company. It was overhauled with new engine in 1953 but was not used in the summer of 1957 as the Indian agent used floatplanes instead. In 1958, James E. McPherson of Fort Resolution acquired the boat and occasionally used it for charter fishing tours of Great Slave Lake. In 1963, it was wrecked during the flood of Hay River. Named for Peter Pond.
	Pilot I		Motor boat used by Government of Canada on Great Slave Lake and Mackenzie River for maintaining navigational beacons and channel markers, c.1942.
	Pilot II	1947	Motor vessel (17 m (57 ft) long, 4.6 m (15 ft) beam, 360 mm (14 in) draft, twin tunnel engine 250 hp (190 kW), crew of four) built in Owen Sound, Ontario, in 1947 and transported north on railway to Waterways, Alberta. Used by Government of Canada on Great Slave Lake/Mackenzie River for maintaining navigational beacons and channel markers. Rebuilt in 1970 and enlarged to 21 m (70 ft) long. In 1979 the boat was purchased by Arctic Offshore and converted into a drillship tender for use in the Arctic Ocean oil industry and was still owned and operated by this company in the 1990s.
	Pine		Boat built in 1947 by Masterbilt Boats Limited for use of the government game warden in the Wood Buffalo National Park area (Slave/Peace Rivers) where it was still being used in 1952.
	Pinnebog		Diesel tug (95 m (311 ft) long, 15 m (49 ft) beam, 5.5 m (18 ft) draft, 5,700 hp (4,300 kW)) owned by the Northern Transportation Company Limited c. 1970s.
	Polaris		Dominion Survey boat sunk at the south end of McGurran Island on the Mackenzie River on June 26, 1948.
	Porphyry	1938	Diesel tug (18.7 m (61.5 ft) long, 5.2 m (17 ft) wide, 2.6 m (8.5 ft) draft) built by Consolidated Mining & Smelting Company (Cominco) at Waterways, Alberta, in 1938 and used on the Slave/Mackenzie River routes for many years, first by Cominco, and then by the Hudson's Bay Company (1938-c.1946), and the Northern Transportation Company Limited on Great Slave Lake (c. 1949). It was said to be one of the last wooden-hull boats constructed for use in the NWT. The boat was later used by commercial fishers on Great Slave Lake and a R.M. Wynn, a sawmill operator on the Slave River. Last registered owner was the R.M. Wynn Company 1961–1979. By 1971, the hull was abandoned 97 km (60 mi) below Fort Smith on the Slave River and there were plans to restore it as a museum piece but this was never done. Its fate is unknown.
	Ptarmigan		A schooner (12 m (40 ft) long) used one summer in the 1920s by the Indian Affairs agent on Great Slave Lake/Mackenzie River.
	Radium Charles	1947	Diesel tug (34 m (111 ft) long, 8.5 m (28 ft) beam, 1.2 m (4 ft) draft, 1,530 hp (1,140 kW)), built by Yarrows in Esquimalt, launched by the Northern Transportation Company Limited in 1947 for use on the Mackenzie River routes. Still in use by NTCL in 1965. In 2004 it was observed dry docked at the NTCL shipyards in Hay River. As of Sept 2022 it remains dry docked in Hay River.
	Radium Cruiser	1939	Diesel tug (18 m (60 ft) long, 136 bhp (101 kW)) launched by the Northern Transportation Company Limited in 1939 for use on the Mackenzie River routes to Great Bear Lake. Registry closed 1985.
	Radium Dew	1955	Diesel tug (37 m (120 ft) long, 9.1 m (30 ft) beam, 1.5 m (5 ft) draft, 1,540 hp (1,150 kW)), built by Allied Shipbuilders in Vancouver, launched by the Northern Transportation Company Limited in 1955 for use on the Slave/Mackenzie River and Great Slave Lake routes. In 1962-1965 it was supplying communities in the western Arctic Ocean. Retired in 1976 and sold to Groenewagen family in Hay River.
Radium Express at Hay River 2013	Radium Express	1939	Diesel tug (21 m (70 ft) long, 6.1 m (20 ft) beam, 0.91 m (3 ft) draft, 240 bhp (180 kW)) launched by the Northern Transportation Company in 1939 for use on the Slave /Mackenzie River and Great Slave Lake routes. Rebuilt in 1953. In 2013 it was observed dry docked at the NTCL shipyards in Hay River. In 2019 it remains dry docked in Hay River and is scheduled to be scrapped by the Government of the Northwest Territories as the vessel is no longer seaworthy.
	Radium Franklin	1951	Diesel tug (19 m (61 ft) long, 7.3 m (24 ft) beam, 0.61 m (2 ft) draft, 460 hp (340 kW)), built by Allied Shipbuilders in Vancouver, launched by the Northern Transportation Company Limited in 1951 for use on the Mackenzie River/Great Bear River routes. In 2013 it was observed dry docked at the NTCL shipyards in Hay River. In 2019, the Government of the Northwest Territories donated the ship to the Hay River Museum Society.
	Radium Gilbert	1946	Diesel tug (34 m (113 ft) long, 8.5 m (28 ft) beam, 1.5 m (5 ft) draft, 926 hp (691 kW)), built by West Coast Shipbuilders in Vancouver, launched by the Northern Transportation Company Limited in 1946 for use on Great Bear Lake to transport uranium ores from Port Radium to the portage at Great Bear River. Between 1952 and 1957, the ship was captained by Allan McInnes. The route was abandoned in 1980 with the closure of the silver mine at Great Bear Lake, and the boat donated to the community of Délı̨nę for a potential heritage display. Contamination concerns lead to the boat being remediated and cut up for scrap by the Government of Canada in 2005.
	Radium King	1937	Diesel tug (29 m (96 ft) long, 6.1 m (20 ft) beam, 520 hp (390 kW)) launched by the Northern Transportation Company Limited in 1937 for use on the Slave/Mackenzie River/Great Slave Lake routes. The boat was retired in 1967 and donated to the Northern Life Museum in Fort Smith.
	Radium Lad	1937	Diesel tug (18 m (60 ft) long, 4.6 m (15 ft) wide, 1.2 m (4 ft) draft, 120 bhp (89 kW) in 1957) used by the Northern Transportation Company Limited on the Mackenzie/Great Bear River routes c. 1937 – 1960s. Registry closed 1985.
	Radium Miner	1956	Diesel tug (29 m (95 ft) long, 8.5 m (28 ft) beam, 0.86 m (2 ft 10 in) draft, 926 bhp (691 kW)), built by Yarrows in Esquimalt, used by the Northern Transportation Company Limited on the Slave/Mackenzie River routes. In 2019 it is dry docked at the NTCL shipyards in Hay River.
	Radium Prince	1943	Diesel tug (18 m (60 ft) long, 5.2 m (17 ft) wide, 1.0 m (3.3 ft) draft, 240 bhp (180 kW)) used by the Northern Transportation Company Limited on the Mackenzie/Great Bear River routes 1943–1966.
	Radium Prospector	1956	Diesel tug (29 m (95 ft) long, 8.5 m (28 ft) beam, 0.86 m (2 ft 10 in) draft, 926 bhp (691 kW)), built by Yarrows in Esquimalt, used by the Northern Transportation Company Limited on the Mackenzie River/Great Slave Lake routes. Still in use by NTCL in 1965. In 2005 it was observed dry docked at the NTCL shipyards in Hay River. In 2019 it remains dry docked in Hay River.
	Radium Queen	1937	Diesel tug (29 m (96 ft) long, 6.1 m (20 ft) beam, 520 hp (390 kW)) launched by the Northern Transportation Company Limited in 1937 for use on the Athabasca/Slave River routes. Still in use in the 1950s.
	Radium Scout	1946	Diesel tug (136 bhp (101 kW)) launched by the Northern Transportation Company Limited in 1946 for use on the Athabasca/Slave River routes. The boat was retired and donated to the museum in Fort McMurray.
	Radium Trader	1956	Diesel tug (29 m (95 ft) long, 8.5 m (28 ft) beam, 0.86 m (2 ft 10 in) draft, 926 bhp (691 kW)), built by Yarrows in Esquimalt, launched by the Northern Transportation Company Limited in 1956 for use on the Slave/Mackenzie River routes. In 1965, it was being used on the Slave/Athabasca River systems in northern Alberta. Still in use in 1982. In 2004 it was observed dry docked at the NTCL shipyards in Hay River. In 2019 it remains dry docked in Hay River.
	Radium Yellowknife	1948	Diesel tug (37 m (120 ft) long, 8.5 m (28 ft) beam, 1.2 m (4 ft) draft, 1,530 hp (1,140 kW)) launched by the Northern Transportation Company Limited in 1948 for use on the Slave/Mackenzie River/Great Slave Lake routes. Still in use by NTCL in 1963. In the 1990s, it was owned by McKeil Marine and in service on Lake Ontario.
	Rae (MV)	1947	Survey yacht (14 m (45 ft) long, 3.4 m (11 ft) wide, 1.8 m (6 ft) draft, 140 hp (100 kW) engine) used by the Canadian Hydrographic Survey on Great Slave Lake c.1950s-c.1962. Sold to Territorial Resorts Limited in Hay River in 1971 and then in 1979 to Lionel Gagnier in Hay River.
	Rae		RCMP motor launch used on Great Slave Lake between Fort Rae and Yellowknife in 1945.
	Rae II		Hudson's Bay Company schooner piloted by Louis Roy, post manager at Fort Resolution at Great Slave Lake in the early 20th century.
	Rae Point	1963	Diesel boat used by Department of Fisheries patrols on Great Slave Lake in 1963–1984, with home port of Hay River. In 2004, it was owned by John E. Stevenson of Courtenay.
	RAM (MS)		Boat owned by Imperial Oil at Norman Wells and put up for sale in 1947. Government considered purchasing as a game warden patrol boat. Not to be confused with the other boat RAM?.
	RAM	1930	Tug boat (9.8 m (32 ft) long, 25 hp (19 kW) engine) used by the government for moving supplies and freight from Aklavik to Reindeer Station in the Mackenzie River delta during 1930–1952. It was built in 1929 at Star Shipyards in New Westminster and delivered to Waterways Alberta in the fall of 1929 and launched at Aklavik in 1930 by the Porslid brothers who operated the Reindeer Station. It operated with a 15 m (50 ft) scow.
	Rambler		Gas boat used by the government game warden on buffalo patrols out of Fort Smith/Fort Fitzgerald on the Slave River in 1922–1923. On September 9, 1923, the Rambler was struck by the Hudson's Bay Company tug boat Liard River and partially sunk at Fort Smith while docked. The vessel was heavily damaged and not expected to be used in the future, as it was also unsuitable for work in the north, having originally been designed as a pleasure craft for the Saint Lawrence River in Ontario.
	Ranger		Boat used by the Government of Canada game warden in the Wood Buffalo National Park/Slave/Peace River area c. 1925–1948. AKA Ranger II?
	Rayrock		Boat owned by A.S. Hodgson on Great Slave Lake to move freight from Hay River to the Rayrock Mine road at the north end of Marian Lake, c.1957/1958. In 1972, the 'Rayrock' was a boat now owned by Richard Whitford and Peter Anderson and it was being used in Fort Rae (Behchoko) to haul logs for building a new dock.
	RCMP Coppermine	1944	A boat launched by the RCMP in 1944 for their post at Coppermine (Kugluktuk) on the Arctic Ocean. It was a Columbia River model boat (9.8 m (32 ft) long, 2.7 m (9 ft) beam, 0.91 m (3 ft) draft, 20 hp (15 kW) Kermath engine), built by the Alberta Motor Boat Company in Edmonton.
	RCMP Jennings	1953	Formerly the Aklavik II. Motor schooner used by the Royal Canadian Mounted Police for patrols in the Mackenzie Delta, Aklavik and Inuvik area 1961–1964, and Coppermine detachment 1964-1969. Surplused by the RCMP in 1969. Renamed the Amoulik in 1970 when purchased by the Coppermine Eskimo Cooperative. In 1982 it was purchased by Larry Whittaker and was renamed the Fort Hearne and refitted with new engine in 1988 and still in service in the Coronation Gulf area in 2000. In 2017 it is dry docked in Kugluktuk, Nunavut.
	Reindeer	1945	Boat (11 m (35 ft) long, 50 hp (37 kW) engine) built in 1945 by Alberta Motor Boat Company. It was a Columbia River fishing style boat. It was used by government warden patrols at Reindeer Station on the Mackenzie River in 1947-1952 and on patrols to Kittigazuit.
	Reliance (AS)		Formerly the Montreal. In 1927, the Montreal departed Fort Smith in charge of the Royal Canadian Mounted Police to set up an RCMP post at Fort Reliance on the east end of Great Slave Lake. The name of the boat was soon thereafter changed to Reliance. In 1949 it was condemned at Fort Reliance and presumably replaced with a vessel of the same name, as in 1962 there was another vessel named Reliance operating by the RCMP on Great Slave Lake.
	Resolute (MB)		Motor boat used by the Indian agent at Fort Resolution on Great Slave Lake and the Mackenzie River during 1924–1935.
	Resolution (AS)		Schooner used by the Royal Canadian Mounted Police for patrols on Great Slave Lake c. 1921 – c. 1941, based at Fort Resolution.
	Richard	1947	Diesel tug (25 m (82 ft) long, 6.2 m (20.5 ft) wide, 2.1 m (7 ft) draft, 1,000 bhp (750 kW) engine) used by the Yellowknife Transportation Company on the Mackenzie River/Great Slave Lake routes 1947–1965. The vessel was rebuilt with new superstructure in 1962. Originally called the Richard E (on launch in 1947) and renamed YT Richard in 1959. Acquired by the Northern Transportation Company Limited in 1965 and renamed NT Richard in 1967.
	Rumley		Fish packer boat owned by Menzies Ltd. in 1965 based out of Hay River, but going to spend the summer in Inuvik.
	Saline (MV)	1942	Originally owned by the United States Army at Norman Wells in 1942 and then Imperial Oil in 1945. Diesel tug (21.2 m (69.5 ft) long, 4.6 m (15 ft) wide, 1.8 m (6 ft) draft, 500 bhp (370 kW)) used by the Yellowknife Transportation Company on the Mackenzie River/Great Slave Lake routes 1947-c.1976. Renamed the YT Saline in 1956 after a rebuild in Hay River. In the spring of 1949, the YK Transportation Company reported that the Saline had been carried from its wintering moorage near Fort Good Hope on the Mackenzie River and swept downstream and not at the time of publication. It is not clear if this boat was ultimately found, or if a new boat named Saline was commissioned after 1949. The Saline vessel was rebuilt with new superstructure and relaunched on June 19, 1962, for use on the Slave River/Great Slave Lake routes.
	Sandy Jane (MV)	1946	Diesel tug (23 m (75 ft) long, 7.0 m (23 ft) wide, 1.5 m (5 ft) draft, 800 hp (600 kW)), built by Yarrows in Esquimalt, used by the Yellowknife Transportation Company on the Mackenzie River/Great Slave Lake routes from 1946 to October 1956 when it sank 40 km (25 mi) miles south of Yellowknife in a storm. The crew was rescued by another ship. The Sandy Jane was named after the daughter of Earle Harcourt, owner/manager of the Yellowknife Transportation Company.
	Sans Sault	1965	Diesel tug (23 m (75 ft) long, 7 m (23 ft) beam, 1 m (3 ft 3 in) draft, 925 kW) launched in 1965 by the Canadian Department of Transport as a dredge tender and tug boat on the Mackenzie River routes to Tuktoyaktuk. In 2004–2009, it was owned by the town of Hay River. In 2019 it is owned by the Government of the Northwest Territories and dry docked in Hay River.
	Santanna	1936 or 1938	Roman Catholic mission diesel boat (18.08 m (59 ft 4 in) long, 4.37 m (14 ft 4 in) beam, 1.63 m (5 ft 4 in) draft, 120 hp (89 kW) Atlas-Imperial diesel engine) based in Fort Resolution for use on the Slave/Mackenzie River/Great Slave Lake routes until 1960. It was built by Denholm and Curry in Fort McMurray in 1936 or 1938 as the MLD on order for the Consolidated Mining & Smelting for their gold prospecting on Lake Athabasca. Consolidated cancelled the order even though the boat was completed, and so it was put up for bid. The Roman Catholic Mission's bid was accepted and the boat was renamed Santanna in 1941. The pilot of the boat in 1941 was Catholic brother Henry Sareault. The boat with a small barge transported freight, food, mission personnel and children attending residential school in the Northwest Territories. After its long service ended in 1960, the boat was kept at the Mission Shipyard outside of Fort Resolution. It was for sale in June 1962 for $4,000. In 1983 it was dry docked in Hay River at Porritt's Landing for restoration by new owners; a few years later, it was destroyed by arson while beached in Hay River. AKA Sant Anna.
	Scamp	1957	Diesel tug (17 m (55 ft) long, 4.3 m (14 ft) wide, 1.2 m (4 ft) draft294 hp (219 kW)) used by the Yellowknife Transportation Company on the Mackenzie River/Liard River routes 1957–1976. AKA YT Scamp.
	Sheila J III	1970	Diesel tug boat (15 m (50 ft) long, 5.2 m (17 ft) beam, 0.91 m (3 ft) draft, twin 400 hp (300 kW) engines) owned by Mike Cooper operating on the Liard River-based out of Fort Liard, Still operating there for Cooper Barging as of 2021. Built in 1970 by Alberni Engineering. Rebuilt engines in 1989.
	Saskalta	1921	
	Sikanni Chief (MV)	1938	Diesel tug of wood construction (18 m (59 ft) long, 6.1 m (20 ft) wide, 1.8 m (5.8 ft) draft, 102 hp (76 kW) engine, 55 gross tonnage) used by the Yellowknife Transportation Company on the Mackenzie River routes 1938-c.1946. In 1973, it was a derelict wreck at Axe Point near Mills Lake on the Mackenzie River, YTCL's former shipyard. AKA Sickanni Chief.
	Silver Belle	1944	Motor vessel wood-hull vessel originally built for the Royal Canadian Navy by A.C. Benson shipyard Vancouver in 1944. There is operated as "YFP 12", probably in Esquimalt Harbour (YFP Yard Ferry Personnel). Later it was used in the NWT as a pleasure craft used on Great Bear Lake by employees at the Echo Bay silver mine 1960s-1970s. Brought to Yellowknife by Dave Lorenzen in 1976 and sold to David Smith who operated it on Great Slave Lake for many years before it was too far gone to keep in repair. It was disposed of at the Yellowknife city dump c.1994.
	Silver Queen		
MV Slave	Slave (MV)	1943	Diesel tug (22.5 m (73.7 ft) long, 5.9 m (19.5 ft) wide, 1.4 m (4.6 ft) draft, 270 bhp (200 kW)) owned by the Northern Transportation Company Limited on the Slave/Mackenzie River routes 1945–1961. It was originally a United States Army tug boat used on the Mackenzie River during construction of the Canol pipeline 1943–1944, carrying the designation RT-902.
	Slave River (SS)	1912	Steam-driven sternwheeler (38 m (125 ft) long, 7.0 m (23 ft) beam, 1.5 m (5 ft) draft, 125 ton cargo, 100 passengers) owned by the Hudson's Bay Company (1912-1914), the Lamson & Hubbard Trading Company (1919), Alberta Arctic Transportation (1921), and the Hudson's Bay Company (1924) for use on the Athabasca/Peace/Slave River routes. It was no longer in service by 1924 and broken up in 1925.
	Slave River	1929	Diesel tug (21 m (70 ft) long, 4.3 m (14 ft) wide, 0.91 m (3 ft) draft) operated by Hudson's Bay Company from 1929 to 1949 on the Athabasca/Slave River routes, and then by the Northern Transportation Company Limited from 1956 to 1962.
	Sparrow	1897	Steamboat (steel frame covered in oak, 20 m (65 ft) long, two 60 hp (45 kW) marine engines) built at Athabasca Landing in 1897 by George T. Leitch. Sold to Dick Secord in 1898 and then to Hislop & Nagle soon after, who floated it down the Athabasca/Slave Rivers to Fort Fitzgerald and then over the portage to Fort Smith. It was then renamed the Eva Nagle.
	Speed		Gasoline schooner operated by the Northern Traders Company c. 1921 – c. 1924 along the Slave/Mackenzie Rivers and Great Slave Lake. It caught fire and sank on Great Slave Lake and was replaced by the Speed II which ironically later suffered the same fate.
	Speed II		Gasoline schooner (14 m (45 ft) long) operated by Northern Traders Company on Great Slave Lake c. 1927, and later by Northern Waterways Limited on Great Bear Lake 1932–1933. It caught fire and sank on Great Bear Lake in October 1933 killing two people. At the time it was skippered by prominent Yellowknife businessman, Vic Ingraham, who later had a boat named after him.
	Spruce (MB)		Motor boat (9.8 m (32 ft) long, 1.63 m (5 ft 4 in) beam, 0.97 m (3 ft 2 in) draft). Originally the Nanoon, it was purchased from Imperial Oil in 1947 by the Government of Canada for use by the Yellowknife game warden. Retrofitted at Fort Smith winter 1947/1948. Briefly in the summers of 1948 and 1949 it was operating on Great Slave Lake with home port in Yellowknife. It was used by the game warden and other federal officials during summer patrols. By 1950 the boat was no longer being used as it was thought to be unsuitable for warden patrols. In 1952 the Spruce was sold to Walter England of Yellowknife.
	St. Alphonse	1894	An Missionary Oblates of Mary Immaculate steam-ship (16 m (54 ft) long, 3.2 m (10.5 ft) wide, 1.5 m (4.8 ft) draft, 3 hp (2.2 kW)), on the Mackenzie and lower Slave Rivers. In 1895–1901, it was built for Bishop Émile Grouard, Fort Chipewyan.
	St. Ann		Roman Catholic mission boat from 1941 to 1963 in the western Arctic Ocean, at Tuktoyaktuk. In 1963 it was sold to someone in Hay River.
	St. Charles	1903	Roman Catholic mission boat (20 m (67 ft) long, 3.7 m (12 ft) wide) on the upper Peace River from 1903 to 1915, the first steamship on the upper Peace River. It was later owned by Fred Lawrence. In 1915 it was grounded during freeze-up and dismantled in 1916–1917.
	St. Emile	1902–1903	An Missionary Oblates of Mary Immaculate ship, on Lesser Slave Lake.
	St. Gabriel	1945	Catholic Mission boat on Great Slave Lake based in Fort Resolution c.1945.
	St. Joseph	1893	An Missionary Oblates of Mary Immaculate ship, on the Athabasca, Peace and upper Slave Rivers.
	St. Marie	1907	Catholic Mission boat built and launched in 1907 at Fort Smith on the Slave River. In 1912 it was purchased by Northern Traders Company and renamed the Northland Trader in 1912. See Northland Trader.
	Stanton		The Stanton was a former Japanese fishing boat (12 m (38 ft) long, 2.7 m (9 ft) wide, 0.91 m (3 ft) draft, 30 hp (22 kW) Palmer engine) purchased by the Catholic mission in 1942 for use in the Mackenzie Delta and western Arctic Ocean. It was stationed at the trading posts Stanton and Paulatuk in the 1940s. In 1944, the Catholic mission put the boat up for sale as it was too small for mission work. The boat was then used by the Government of Canada for game warden patrols at Reindeer Station, Tuktoyaktuk, and Anderson River areas in 1947–1948. In 1952 it was based in Hay River. Another source says that in 1952, the boat was out of service all season at Aklavik.
	Stenodus (MV)	1956	Department of Fisheries cabin cruiser patrol boat (13 m (43 ft) long, 3.7 m (12 ft) beam, 1.5 m (5 ft) draft, 15 tons displacement, 165 hp (123 kW) Cummins diesel engine, V-bottom hull) on Great Slave Lake, built by Matheson Boat Works in Ontario. Used as a patrol boat on Great Slave Lake 1956-c.1962.
	Sternwheeler	1934	Steam-powered sternwheeler (26 m (84 ft) long, 4.7 m (15.4 ft) wide, 1.2 m (4 ft) draft, 100 hp (75 kW)) used by the Northern Transportation Company Limited for use on the Mackenzie/Great Bear River routes 1934–1946. In 1934, it was described as a 20-ton capacity boat running between two sets of rapids on the Great Bear River, in conjunction with other boats below and above the rapids. After the portage around the rapids was completed in 1937, the Sternwheeler was brought down river, and ran the route from Fort Norman on the Mackenzie River up the Great Bear River to where the portage into Great Bear Lake started.
	Stuart Lake	1944	A gas boat (14 m (45 ft) long, 2.9 m (9.5 ft) wide, 0.85 m (2.8 ft) draft, 160 bhp (120 kW)) used by the Hudson's Bay Company on the Mackenzie/Liard River routes 1944–1958, with service as far north as Aklavik. In 1961, it was owned by the Northern Transportation Company Limited. AKA Stewart Lake.
	Tembah	1963	The original ship by this name, a Department of Transport vessel operating on the Mackenzie River and based in Hay River in 1965.
	Tembah (CCGS)	1972	Canadian Coast Guard vessel 37.5 m (123 ft) long, 8 m (26 ft) breadth, 0.9 m (2 ft 11 in) draft) on Great Slave Lake and up the Mackenzie River starting in 1972. Dry docked in Hay River for potential retrofitting in 2010. The vessel was sold to Buffalo Airways in Hay River in 2019. In the winter of 2019/2020, the Tembah with its name removed from the hull was frozen in at Yellowknife's Old Town docks.
	Tern		Survey boat used by Canadian Hydrographic Survey on Great Slave Lake c. 1962/1963.
	Thomas G. Murphy		Motor boat used by the Indian agent at Fort Simpson and on the Liard River during 1935–1937.
	Thunder River		Tug boat operating on the Mackenzie River between Norman Wells and Hay River in 1949, was involved in the transportation of the former Canol pipeline infrastructure after it was salvaged for resale. In 1950, the Thunder River boat was advertised for sale in Edmonton newspapers. It was described as 57 feet long and 12 feet beam, with twin 160-horsepower engines, and came with two 150-ton barges and auxiliary equipment. At the time of sale, it was in Hay River.
	Tilirak	1962	Boat built in Hay River by Don Violette and launched in 1962 for mission work in the Mackenzie River and western Arctic Ocean. Tilirak means "messenger" in the Inuit language. AKA Tiliruk.
	Utikuma (MV)		Tug boat operated by Yellowknife Transportation Company on the Mackenzie River near Aklavik in 1942, captained by Walter Furstenworth.
	Vancouver		RCMP motor launched used by the detachment at Fort Rae on Great Slave Lake, 1930.
	Velox (MB)		Motor boat based in Aklavik c. 1936/1937, used by the Royal Canadian Corps of Signals to supply their radio stations in the Mackenzie Delta and Arctic Coast.
	Vic Ingraham	1971	Diesel tugboat (45.6 m (149.5 ft) long, 15 m (50 ft) beam, 1.14 m (3 ft 9 in) draft, 4,700 hp (3,500 kW)) launched by the Northern Transportation Company Limited in 1971 for use in the Western Arctic of the NWT, with home port in Inuvik. Still in use in 2016. Like the Ingraham Trail it is named for Vic Ingraham a prominent Yellowknife businessman.
	Watson Lake (MV)	1946	Diesel tug (23 m (75 ft), 5.5 m (18 ft) beam, 0.69 m (2 ft 3 in) draft, 294 hp (219 kW)), built by Standard Iron Works in Edmonton, owned by the Hudson's Bay Company, first on the Peace River by Captain Jack O'Sullivan until 1952, and then on the Slave/Mackenzie River routes. It was said to be the last commercial tug boat to operate on the Peace River. The Northern Transportation Company Limited owned the boat in c.1963 and later (2016) the Government of the Northwest Territories Department of Public Works.
	Weenusk	1921	Motor boat (18 m (60 ft) long, 3.4 m (11 ft) wide, 1.2 m (4 ft) draft, 3 hp (2.2 kW)) owned by the Hudson's Bay Company on the Peace River from 1921 to 1939.
	Weenusk II	1940	Diesel tug (85 hp (63 kW)) owned by the Hudson's Bay Company on the Peace River from 1940 to 1951, captained by Douglas Cadenhead.
	W.L. Taylor (MV)		Diesel tug (13 m (42 ft) long, 3.7 m (12 ft) wide, 0.76 m (2.5 ft) draft) owned by Imperial Oil at Norman Wells in 1945–1946, during which time it was rented to the government for fire patrols along the Mackenzie River. The boat was named after Walker L. Taylor, Imperial Oil manager during that time.
	Wrigley (SS)	1886	Screw-prop steamer (27 m (90 ft) long, 4.3 m (14 ft) beam, 130 ton cargo) operated by the Hudson's Bay Company, commissioned at Fort Smith in 1886, operating on the Slave and Mackenzie Rivers below Fort Smith. Captain J.W. Mills piloted this vessel from 1893 to 1903. The Wrigley was overhauled and rebuilt in Fort Smith in early 1898, and continued to serve until it was replaced by the S.S. Mackenzie River launched in 1908.
	Yellowknife Expeditor	1943	A war-surplus United States Navy landing craft (built in 1943), converted in 1949 into a passenger and freight carrying vessel (34 m (112 ft) long, 7.2 m (23.5 ft) wide, 2.3 m (7.7 ft) draft, 1,000 hp (750 kW)) by Yellowknife Transportation Company. It provided scheduled service between Hay River and Yellowknife on Great Slave Lake during the summers of 1949, 1950, and 1951 only. It was damaged by hitting a reef in 1951 so was not used the following summer. In 1955 it was rebuilt as a tug with the front 18 m (60 ft) bow cut off and flattened in order to push barges. In 1958, the craft was transporting freight between Hay River and Aklavik on the Mackenzie River, and in 1962 it was servicing communities in the Western Arctic Ocean where it had overwintered. Following the sale of YTC to the NTCL in 1965, the vessel was taken out of service, and later scrapped at the Fort Smith Bell Rock shipyards in 1969. AKA YT Expeditor and NT Expeditor

== See also ==
- Steamboats of the Peace River
- Northern Alberta Railways
