= Hudson Hope =

Hudson Hope may refer to:

- Hudson's Hope, a community, on the Peace River, in British Columbia
- Hudson's Hope (ship, 1920), see Boats of the Mackenzie River watershed
- Hudson Hope (ship, 1915), see Boats of the Mackenzie River watershed
