= Owen Forrester Browne =

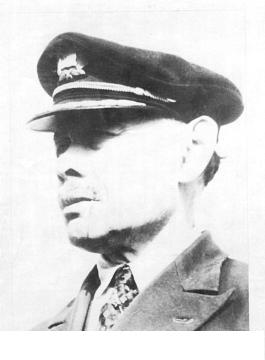
- Captain Owen Forrester Browne
- Born: March 17th, 1869; New Westminster, British Columbia
- Died: Sept. 14th, 1948; New Westminster, British Columbia
- Occupation: steamship captain
- Spouse: Margaret Seymour
- Parent(s): Owen W Browne and Teresa Aponi

Owen Forrester Browne was a paddle steamer captain in British Columbia, and Alberta, Canada. He was born in New Westminster and worked on the lower Fraser and Yukon River sternwheelers before coming to the upper Fraser River in the early 1900s.

== Career ==
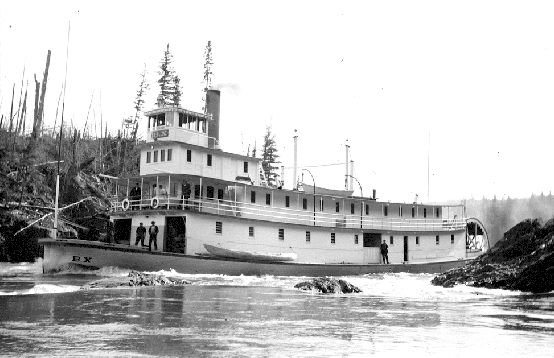
BX 1911

Owen Forrester Browne, of Hawaiian heritage, began work on the upper Fraser River in 1906 piloting the pioneer sternwheeler Charlotte. Because of his familiarity with the river and his skill as a swift water pilot the BC Express Company hired him to pilot their first sternwheeler, the BX. Hawaiian pilots were known for their confidence in rough waters and intuitive navigational skills.

Browne skippered the BX for his entire career from May 13, 1910, until August 1919 when she sank in the Cottonwood Canyon carrying 100 tons of sacked cement bound for Soda Creek that had been intended for building the Deep Creek Bridge of the Pacific Great Eastern Railway.

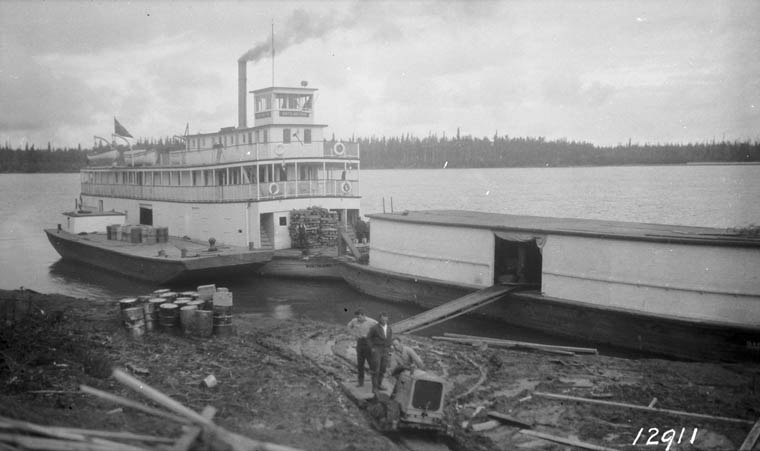
Northland Echo 1931

After he left the Fraser, Browne piloted the Northland Echo on the Athabasca River in Alberta.

== Family ==
In 1915, Browne married Margaret Seymour of South Fort George, daughter of the locally famous, Granny Seymour, and they had four sons and five daughters. One of Browne's daughters was named Tito who married Ranford Messer in 1952 and 4 children, 2 sons and 2 daughters. One of Messer's daughters was Colleen Messer, who married Bruce Holbrook and had 2 daughters, Stephanie and Sasha.

Browne's Children include Hugh M. Browne, Betty O'Donnell, Tito Messer, Oni Browne, Blani Olson, William Browne, Earl Browne, May Thomas, and Leila Johnston.

Browne retired in New Westminster, where he died in 1948.

Browne's mother-in-law Granny Seymour (née Margaret Boucher) came to be known as the holder of important traditional herbal medicine and Indigenous knowledge and her longevity attracted local and international attention. Seymour's home was South Fort George, at the northern end of the BX route.

== See also ==
- Steamboats of the Upper Fraser River in British Columbia
