= Peace River (1905 ship) =

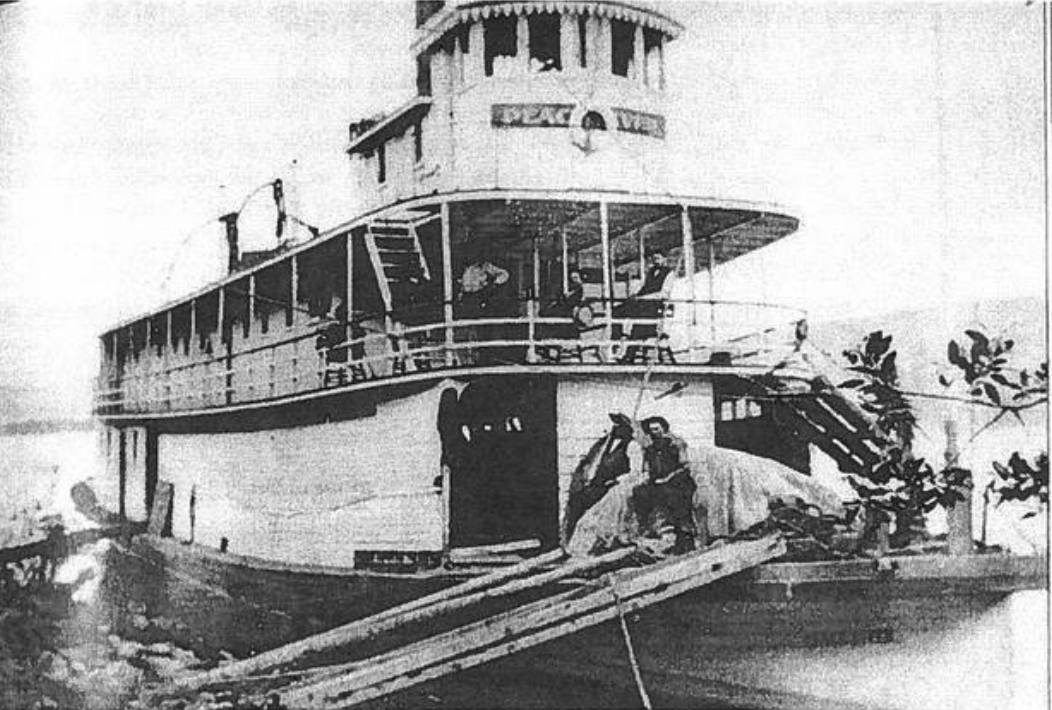
The steamship Peace River, at Hudon's Hope, July 1912.

The Peace River was a sternwheel steamship that provided transportation on the river of the same name. She was 110 feet (34 m) long, and could carry 80 tons of cargo and 25 passengers. The Peace River had navigational difficulties. The Vermilion Chutes was the first impassable barrier, and the Peace River operated on the 500 miles (800 km) between Fort Vermilion and Fort St John.

She was launched in 1905, and she usually managed three round trips per year.
