= Northern Trading Company =

Canadian fur trading company

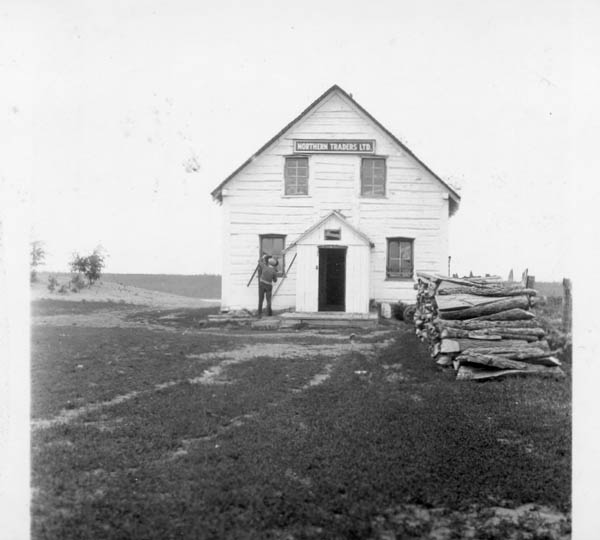
Northern Trading Co. at Fort Smith

The Northern Trading Company was an enterprise engaged in the fur trading business in the north of Canada, with outposts in the Athabasca-Mackenzie River district in Alberta and the Northwest Territories during the early 20th century. They were in direct competition with the Hudson's Bay Company, and controlled an estimated eight per cent of the fur trading market in the north by 1922.

Its principal was Colonel J.K. "Peace River Jim" Cornwall, who got a start in the Peace River and Lesser Slave Lake district in the early 1900s and expanded north after the 1911 takeover of Hislop & Nagle and their fur trading posts in the Northwest Territories.

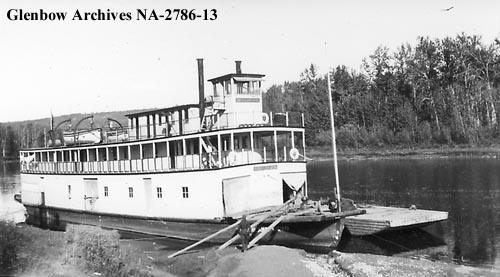

Northern Trading was engaged in river transportation, primarily to service its own fur trading posts, but they also provided commercial passenger and freight service on their steam-driven vessels. The company went into receivership in 1926, and struggled to remain in business for the next seven years while under the management of creditors. In 1931, the company was liquidated, with all stock being sold to the Hudson's Bay Company, and its transportation arm being sold and reorganized as Northern Waterways Limited.
