= Lamson & Hubbard Trading Company =

Lamson & Hubbard Trading Company (also referred to as Lamson & Hubbard Canadian Co. or Lamson Trading Co.) was an enterprise engaged in the fur trading business in the Canadian North during the early 20th century, with over fourteen outposts in the Athabasca-Mackenzie River district in Alberta and the Northwest Territories. The company was in direct competition with the Hudson's Bay Company and they controlled an estimated 10% of the fur trading market in the north by 1922.

Lamson & Hubbard was also engaged in river transportation. This was primarily to service the company's isolated fur trading posts along the Mackenzie River, although the company also offered a commercial service through its wholly owned subsidiary, Alberta & Arctic Transportation Company (incorporated in 1921). Its flagship on the Alberta to Arctic river route was the S.S. Distributor steam-driven paddlewheeler launched in 1920 at Fort Smith, Northwest Territories to service Lamson & Hubbard's posts along the Mackenzie River, all the way to the delta where it meets the Arctic Ocean.

The company made good profits until about 1921 when fur prices plummeted. Lamson & Hubbard had put all of its capital into expansion, keeping a small a liquid reserve leaving it vulnerable to market volatility. On the other hand, the larger Hudson's Bay Company weathered the storm of falling prices. As a result, the HBC was in a position to systematically attack its rivals' territory and business partners, which Lamson & Hubbard lacked the financial resources or manpower to battle back. This led to the HBC buying out all of the stock in Lamson & Hubbard in 1924, including its transportation wing Alberta & Arctic Transportation, giving the HBC a good measure of dominance in the fur trading and transportation industry of northern Alberta and the Northwest Territories.

== See also ==
- List of trading companies
