= Grenfell (1912 ship) =

Steamship

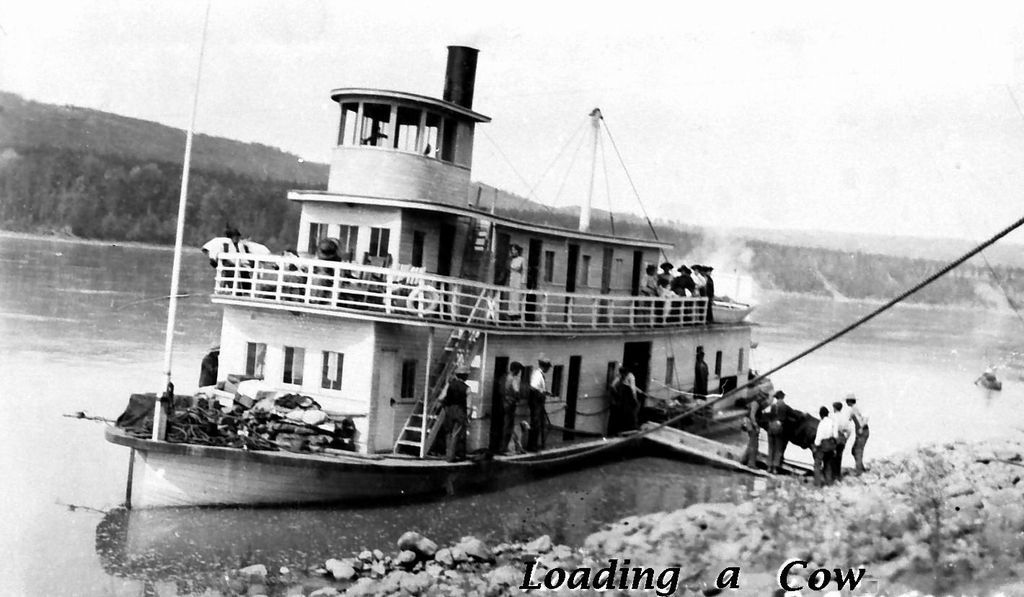
- Passengers loading a reluctant cow onto the Grenfell

General characteristics
- Type: Steam Ship

The Grenfell, built on the Peace River, for the Peace River Trading Company, was the first commercial steamship on the Peace River that was not built for the Hudson's Bay Company.

The impassible Vermilion Chutes divides the Peace River into two navigable sections. The Grenfell operated on the upper reach for only two years before she ran aground 15 miles (24 km) above Fort St. John. She subsequently burned before she could be refloated.
