= Radium Franklin =

Tugboat built in 1951

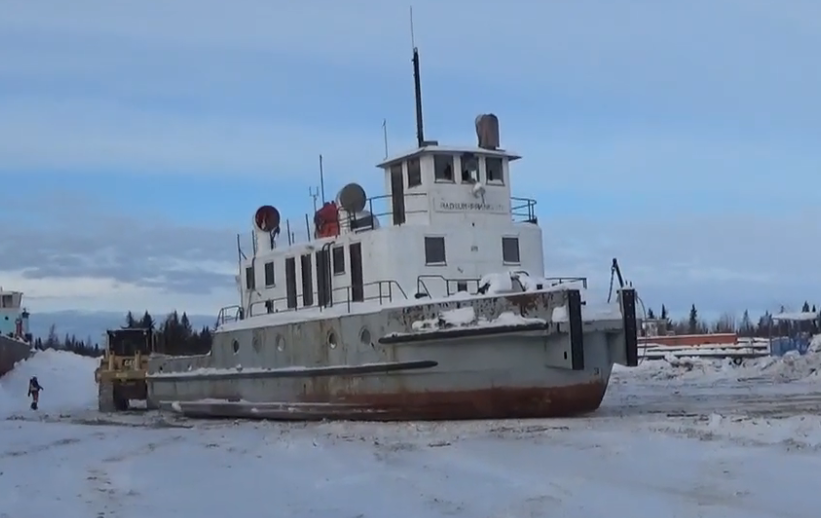

Radium Franklin was a tugboat built in 1951, and operated by the Northern Transportation Company - popularly known as the "Radium Line", because many of their tugboats contained Radium in their name, since they were originally built to haul Uranium ore from Port Radium, on Great Bear Lake. She was retired in 1979, after spending most of her career hauling barge packed with ore, and then briefly serving as a yard tug.

In 2005 the Atomic Energy Canada published a stody on the toxic legacy of the mining of radioactive ore at Port Radium. It said that the Radium Franklin and all other surviving vessels, with the exception of the Radium Gilbert, were uncontaminated.

The CBC News reported on March 31, 2019, that, after sitting in a dry dock in Hay River for four decades she was scheduled to be turned into a museum ship. The Hay River Historical Society plans to restore the vessel's appearance.
