= Radium Prospector =

Tugboat

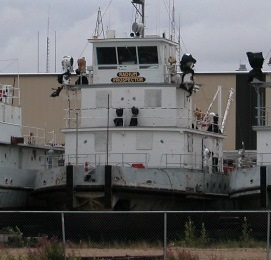
Radium Prospector drydocked in Hay River 2005

The Radium Prospector was a tugboat operated by the Northern Transportation Company's "Radium Line", on the tributaries of the Mackenzie River in Canada. She was launched in 1956. Many of her sister ships also included "Radium" in their name, hence the appellation "Radium line".

The Radium Prospector was launched in 1956. In 2005 the Atomic Energy Canada published a stody on the toxic legacy of the mining of radioactive ore at Port Radium. It said that the Radium Prospector and all other surviving vessels, with the exception of the Radium Gilbert, were uncontaminated. In 2005 she was stored in Tuktoyaktuk.

The Radium Prospector helped ship the materials used to construct the remote radar stations on the Distant Early Warning Line.

In his memoirs Mike Krutko described the Radium Prospector losing all the cargo on all the barges she was pushing due to a dangerous storm on Great Slave Lake.
