= Goldfields, Saskatchewan =

Human settlement in Saskatchewan, Canada

Coordinates: 59°28′N 108°29′W

Goldfields is an abandoned community in Division No. 18, Saskatchewan, Canada. It previously held the status of a village until April 1, 1950. The community was informally founded in 1936 by prospectors after the 1934 discovery of gold on the north shore of Lake Athabasca. The Box Mine, operated by Consolidated Mining & Smelting Company of Canada (Cominco) operated from 1939 to 1942. With the closure of the Box Mine during World War II, Goldfields became a ghost town. Uranium was then discovered in 1948 and a new mining community was built at Uranium City, a few kilometers to the north of Lake Athabasca. Many buildings from Goldfields were salvaged and moved to the new town in the 1950s.

== See also ==
- List of communities in Saskatchewan
