= Henry Christoffersen =

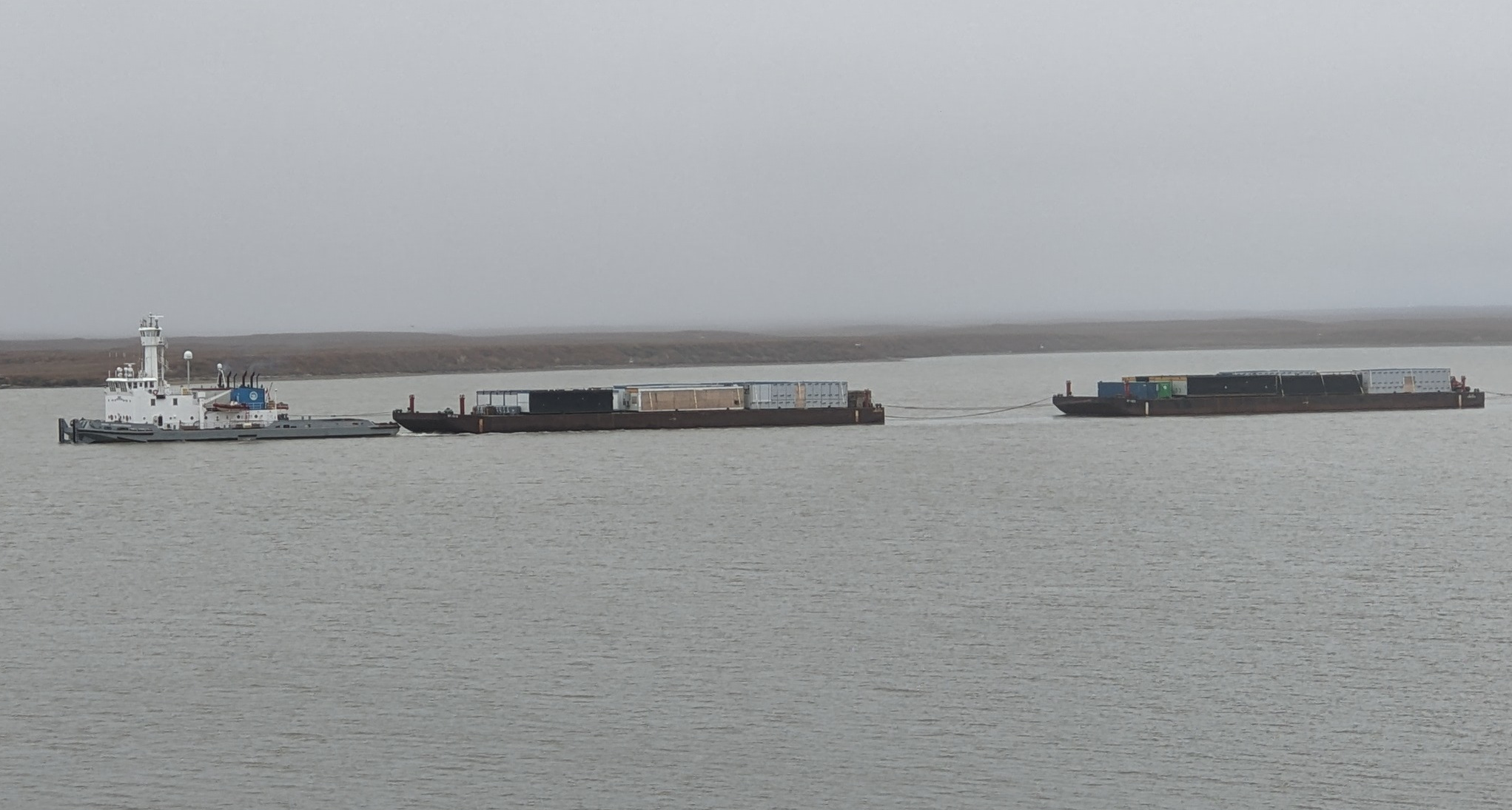

History
- Name: Henry Christoffersen
- Owner: Government of the Northwest Territories, Marine Transportation Services
- Port of registry: Edmonton, Alberta
- Builder: Burrard Yarrows
- In service: 1973

General characteristics
- Class & type: Henry Christoffersen Class
- Type: Tugboat
- Length: 45.23 metres (148.4 ft)
- Installed power: 4500 horsepower
- Speed: 12 knots (22 km/h)

Henry Christoffersen is a shallow draft pusher tug built to operate on Canada's Mackenzie River. She was launched in 1973, and was the name ship of her class. She was designed by the Robert Allan Ltd. ship architects. She was built in Esquimalt, BC at a shipyard known as Burrard Yarrows.

Like other pusher tugs, she has a tower, with a steering bridge, that rises high above her conventional bridge, to help navigate, when she is pushing a line of barges. She displaces 783 tons, and has a draft of just one metre. Her four propellers are mounted in tubes. Each is powered by an 839-horsepower diesel engine.

She has accommodations for thirteen crew members and five supernumaries or passengers.

In addition to towing barges loaded with cargo the Henry Christoffersen gets chartered to support survey expeditions. In 2003 she towed ground penetrating sonar equipment throughout the Mackenzie Delta. In 2007-2008 she was part of a survey of the Beaufort Sea, off Alaska.
