= GSI Mariner =

Stranded Canadian research ship

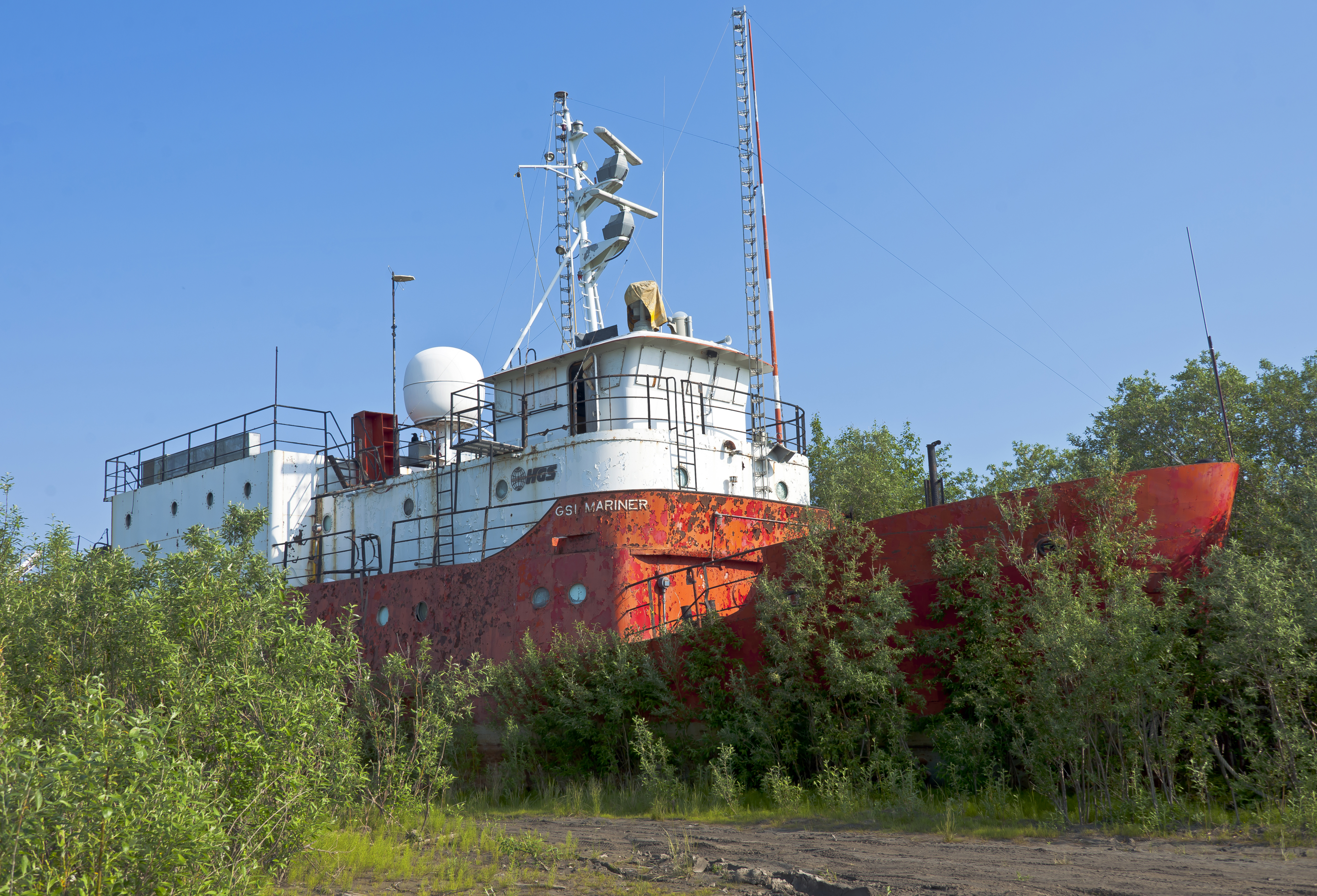
- GSI Mariner on the banks of the Mackenzie at Inuvik, 2015

History
- Name: GSI Mariner
- Owner: Geophysical Service Inc. (1971–1979); Geophoto Services Ltd. (1979–1992); Halliburton Canada (1993–1995); Brian A. Turner (1997–present)
- Port of registry: Edmonton, Alberta, Canada
- Builder: Alum Construction, Edmonton
- Launched: 1971
- Identification: Registry #344937; IMO number: 7629219; MMSI: 316023000
- Fate: Beached on the Mackenzie River near Inuvik, NT 68.33876°N 133.70588°W

General characteristics
- Type: Research/survey vessel
- Tonnage: 309 GT; 115 NT
- Length: 36.5 metres (120 ft)
- Beam: 9.1 metres (30 ft)
- Depth: 2.1 metres (6 ft 11 in)
- Installed power: 730 bhp (540 kW)
- Propulsion: Two diesel engines
- Speed: 11 kn (20 km/h; 13 mph)

GSI Mariner is a Canadian research/survey ship. She was built and used originally by Geophysical Service Inc. (GSI) to record seismic data on the Mackenzie River delta and the Beaufort Sea in the Arctic Ocean. Later she was owned by other companies, including Halliburton Canada. She is currently beached on the banks of the Mackenzie south of Inuvik, near the beginning of the Tuktoyaktuk Winter Road.

GSI Mariner was built in 1971 in Edmonton, and taken up in sections to Great Slave Lake later that year to be launched onto the Mackenzie. GSI ran surveys and did seismic research with her during the summers and beached her over winters, voyages that continued as Halliburton took over GSI and then after the company was reincorporated. Whether she will sail again is not known.

== Characteristics ==
GSI Mariner is built on a steel hull laid in carvel style. She is 36.5 metres (120 ft) long and 2.1 metres (6 ft 11 in) deep with a 9.1-metre (30 ft) beam. She has a gross tonnage of 308 with a net tonnage of 115.

In the engine room power is provided by two diesel engines. Together they deliver 730 brake horsepower (540 kilowatts) to the twin-screw propellers. The vessel can make 11 knots (20 km/h; 13 mph).

The vessel's outer hull and lower deck are painted red. The upper deck is painted white. On each side of the bridge is a logo featuring the capital letters "HGS" and a globe-shaped grid pattern. Various antennae protrude from this level.

== History ==
Davey Einarsson, a GSI executive and lifelong employee of the oilfield services company, returned to Canada from Libya after the 1969 coup d'état that brought Muammar Gaddafi to power. He was assigned to the company's Arctic operations, off the coasts of Alaska and Canada in the Beaufort Sea. At the time the company had only one boat to serve its clients, the MV Grebe, a modified former submarine chaser.

He decided the company needed its own bigger and newer boat. During the winter of 1970 Alum Construction of Edmonton built GSI Mariner in sections. The following summer the company placed those sections on trucks and took them up from Alberta to Hay River, Northwest Territories, where they were welded together and launched into the waters of Great Slave Lake. From there her maiden voyage took her up the Mackenzie River to the Arctic Ocean doing seismic analysis.

The company continued to operate during summers in the 1970s and '80s, even as GSI became part of Halliburton. In 1982 its encounter with a pack of bowhead whales while taking seismic shots off the coast of Alaska was used in scientific research suggesting the species is quite tolerant of offshore oil and gas exploration taking place near its habitat.

During the winters she was moored in ice near Tuktoyaktuk, where the Mackenize drains into the Arctic. By the late 1990s she became the property of an Inuvik man and was beached on the east shore of the river's eastern channel south of Inuvik, where the Tuktoyaktuk Winter Road begins. In that capacity she was often seen as a landmark on the second season of the History Channel series Ice Road Truckers, which took place in the area. Her current certificate of registry expires in May 2025.
