= Distributor (HBC vessel) =

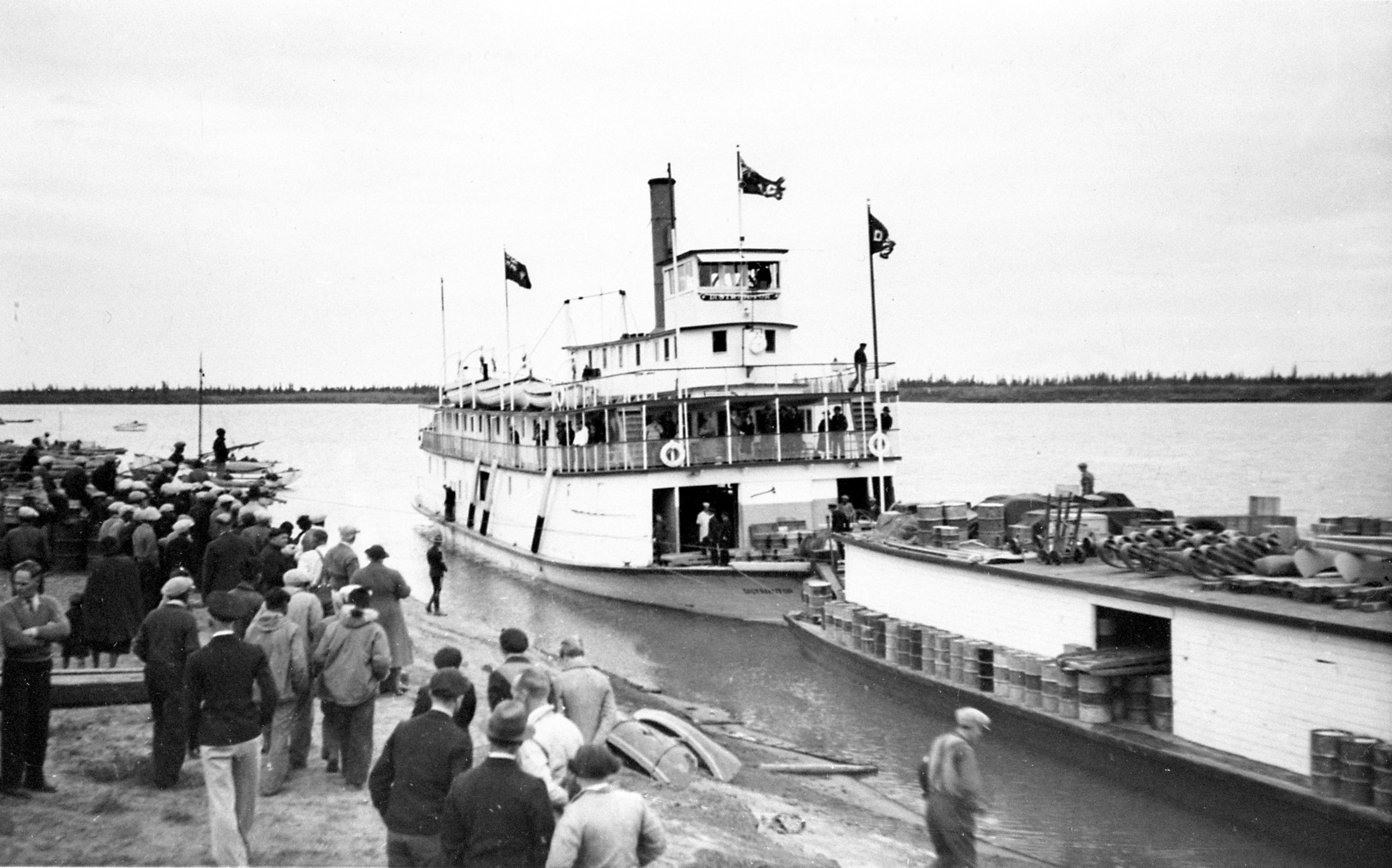
Sternwheeler Distributor at Aklavik, in 1945.

Distributor was a steamship built for service on the Mackenzie River System. The fast moving waters of the Mackenzie River, and the lower reaches of many of its tributaries, were navigable. Cargo was transported to the north on the Slave River, and had to be portaged overland over a long portage between Fort Smith and Fort Fitzgerald. Some steamship were assembled on tributaries of the Slave River, hauled by tractors over the portage, for service on the lower rivers. Distributor was larger than those vessels, and was built in the north.

She had several owners. She was built for Lamson & Hubbard Canadian Company, in 1920, with her construction led by engineers from the yard of George Askew of Vancouver, British Columbia. In 1921 she was sold to Alberta & Arctic Transportation Company. The Hudson's Bay Company bought Alberta & Arctic Transportation, in 1924, acquiring all its assets, including Distributor.

During World War II she was employed helping to build the Canol Project, a companion project to the Alaska Highway.

She was retired in 1947.
