= SS Grahame =

Athabasca River steamship

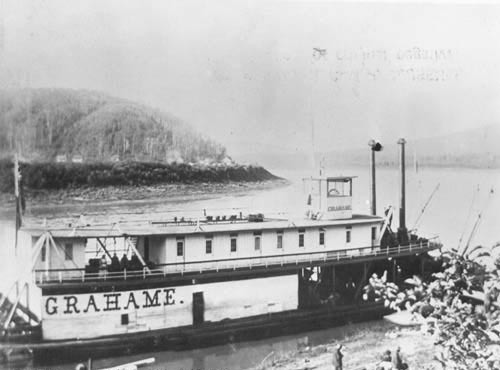
- SS Grahame, at Fort McMurray, in 1899

History
- Name: S.S. Grahame
- Owner: Hudson's Bay Company
- Builder: John W. Smith
- Laid down: 1882
- Launched: 1883

General characteristics
- Length: 135 ft (41 m)

SS Grahame was a wooden sternwheeled steamship built in Fort Chipewyan, District of Athabasca, by the Hudson's Bay Company in 1882–1883 for service on the Athabasca River, lower Peace River, the Clearwater River, and the upper Slave River.

Grahame was the first steam powered vessel in the region.

The engines were built in the south, and shipped overland. The ship was 135 feet (41 m) long, and could carry 140–150 tons of cargo. Construction began under the direction of John W. Smith in August 1882, and Grahame was completed in September 1883 and began regular service in the district in the summer of 1884.

The vessel carried an official delegation from Canada's federal government to negotiate Treaty 8 with the First Nations in 1899.
