= Yellowknife Expeditor =

Cargo and passenger vessel in Canada's Arctic

The Yellowknife Expeditor was a small freighter that operated in Canada's Arctic. She was built for the United States Navy, during World War II, as a shallow draft Landing Craft Infantry, displacing approximately 250 tons. She was acquired by the Yellowknife Transportation Company, who had her converted to carry passengers and freight at the Victoria Machinery Depot, in 1949.

Upon her arrival in Yellowknife, in the fall of 1949, she was said to be the biggest ship in the Mackenzie basin.

Her main use was to provide twice weekly crossings from Hay River, on the south shore of Great Slave Lake, then the terminus of the Mackenzie Highway, a dirt road to the south, and Yellowknife, on the north shore, the territorial capital. She was able to carry up to 50 passengers, an up to 50 tons of refrigerated food, plus up to 200 tons of other cargo. Each crossing was estimated to take seven hours, and were scheduled for twice a week.

In 1957 she was damaged, when she struck a rock. Her repairs included cutting down her superstructure and converting her to a tugboat.
