= Lister (1970 ship) =

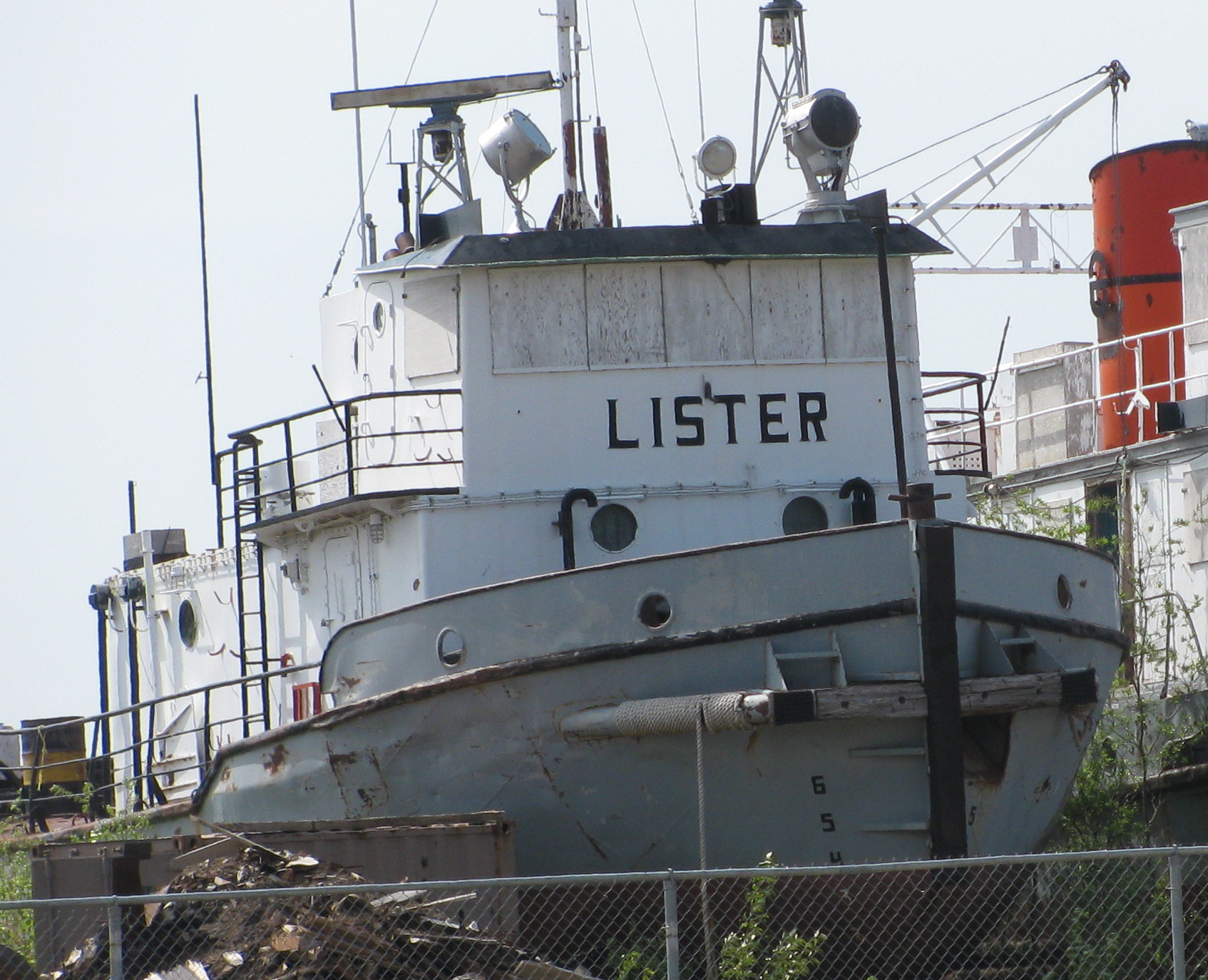
Lister, mothballed, in Hay River, in 2008.

The Lister was a tugboat built for the Northern Transportation Company (NTCL), in 1970. She operated out of the intermodal terminal at Hay River, NWT.

She was 72 feet (22 m) long, and her gross tonnage was 117 tons.

Her design was specified by Harold Lister, her namesake. He wanted a tug shallow enough for river navigation, while still being capable of deep sea navigation.

Her service included pushing barges of supplies down the Mackenzie River from the railhead at Hay River to offshore drilling platforms in the Beaufort Sea.

In April 2019 it was announced she would be scrapped, together with several other older tugboats from the now defunct NTCL.
