= Politics of the Northwest Territories =

Governance of the Northwest Territories

The politics of the Northwest Territories involves not only the governance of the Northwest Territories but also the social, economic and political issues specific to the territory. This includes matters relating to local governance and governance by the federal government of Canada, the inclusion of the aboriginal population in territorial affairs, and the matter of official languages for the territory.

Key to the politics and governance of the Northwest Territories are the limits on the jurisdiction of the territorial government. Territories of Canada have no inherent jurisdiction and only have those powers devolved to them by the federal government. The devolution and delegation of power to the territory has always been a factor in the territory's politics.

A hallmark of politics in the Northwest Territories is that it operates as under a “consensus government” system. Candidates for election to the territorial legislature do not stand as members of a political party. While some candidates may express an affiliation or membership with a party, party membership is not recognized in the legislature. As a result, the Members of the Legislative Assembly select a Premier by way of a secret ballot, rather than on the basis of party affiliation (see Responsible government).

Local governance has been a long-standing issue in the territory. This includes not only the loss of local government authority from the period from 1905 to 1951, when Ottawa asserted direct control over the governance of the territory, but also related matters of aboriginal self-governance and land claims. This latter issue lead, in part, to the division of the territory into the Northwest Territories and Nunavut.

Language has also been a long-standing issue in Northwest Territory politics. French became an official language, along with English, in 1877. This resulted in heated debates in the territorial assembly and the establishment of English as the only official language until pressure from the federal government in the 1980s lead to not only the inclusion of French as an official language, but also nine aboriginal languages.

== See also ==
- History of Northwest Territories
- Legislative Assembly of the Northwest Territories
- Executive Council of the Northwest Territories
- Politics of Canada
- Political Culture of Canada
- Council of the Federation
