= Mackenzie River (1908 ship) =

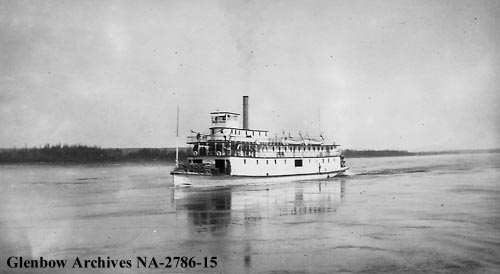

The Mackenzie River was a steamship built by the Hudson's Bay Company, to transport passengers and cargo on the river of the same name.

She was designed in 1906, and completed and launched in 1908. From 1908 to 1923 she mainly served the route from the portage on the Slave River, at Fort Smith, across Great Slave Lake, and down the Mackenzie River to Aklavik, in its delta. Mothballed for a few years starting in 1923, she was returned to service in 1929. During World War II she helped supply American construction troops building the Canol pipeline.

During 1953-1954 she was being used as a floating bunkhouse for fishermen on Great Slave Lake and Hay River.
