= Pilot II =

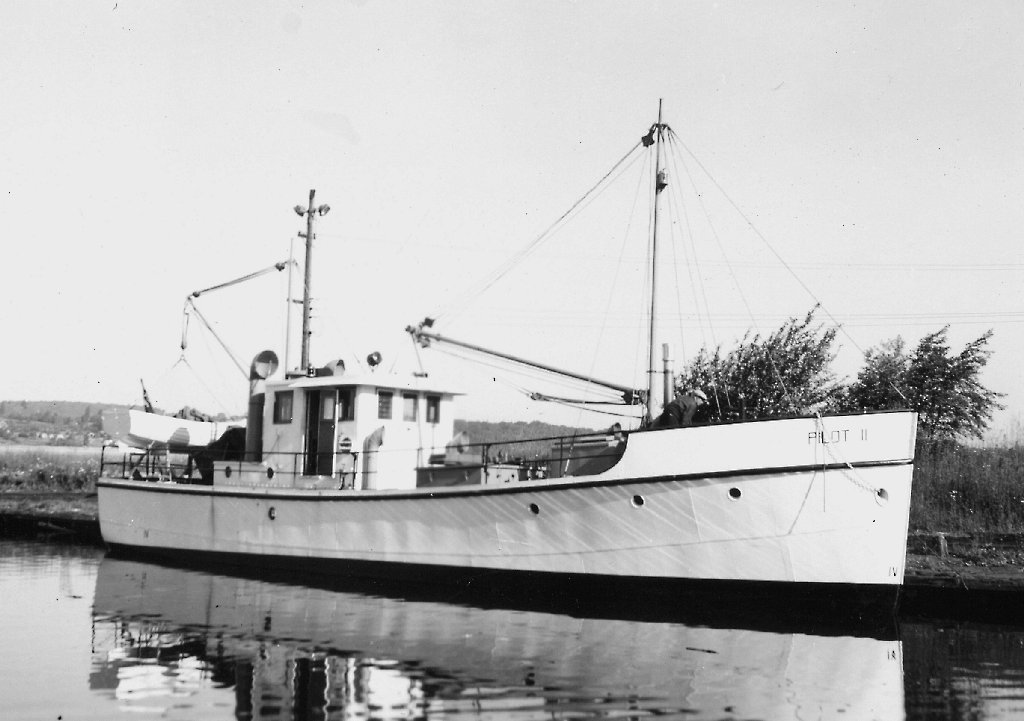
The Pilot II in Owen Sound

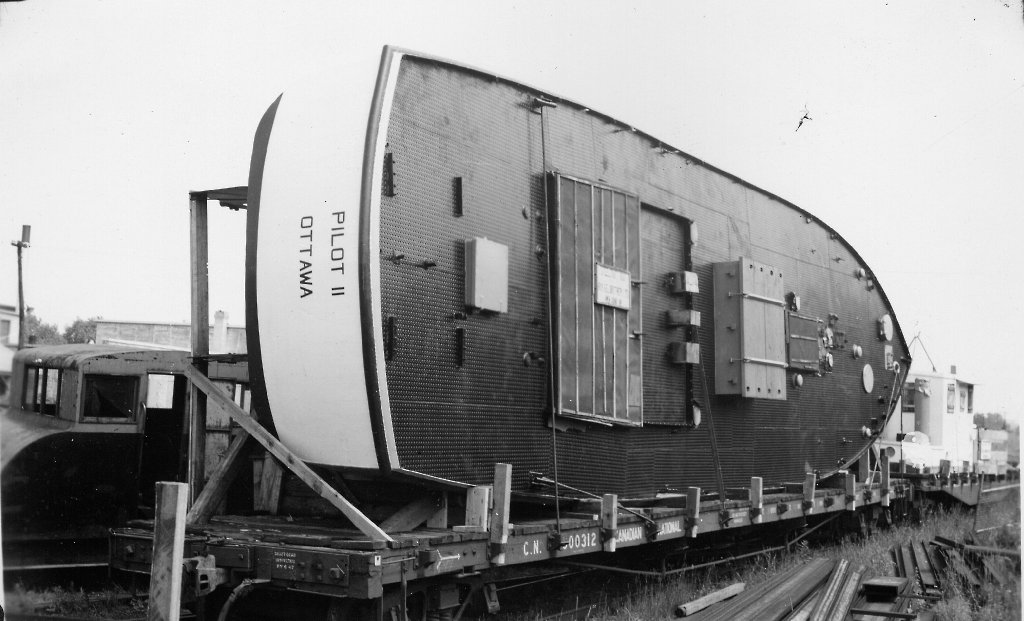
The Pilot II being shipped by rail to Waterways Alberta.

The Pilot II was a buoy tender operated by Canada's Ministry of Transport on Great Slave Lake and the rest of the Mackenzie River system in the Northwest Territories.

The Pilot II draft was only 42 inches, and her twin propellers were enclosed in tunnels. She was built in the Russel Brothers shipyard in Owen Sound, Ontario, then disassembled so she could be shipped by rail to Waterways, Alberta, a riverport on the Clearwater River. Her parts were shipped by barge to Fort Smith, Northwest Territories, where they were portaged around the extensive rapids there, so she could be reassembled and launched on the lower Slave River.

She was rebuilt in 1970, when her length was extended by 14 feet. By 1971 the vessel's ownership had been transferred to Arctic Offshore, but continued to be chartered to perform her usual duties.

Her crew of four live aboard during the short northern shipping season, where their accommodation includes a "full galley", and a "jacketed heater" for domestic hot water.

Specifications
Constructed	1947
Rebuilt	1971
Draft	42 inches (1.1 m)
Length in 1947	56.5 feet (17.2 m)
Length in 1971	70 feet (21 m)
Gross tonnage in 1947	51 gross tons
Gross tonnage in 1971	68 gross tons
Beam	15 feet (4.6 m)
Power	260 horsepower
Complement	4
Cargo Capacity	10 tons
