= Northland Echo =

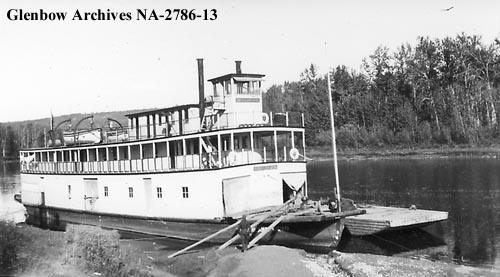
The vessel had a long bow for beaching where there were no docks

Northland Echo was a sternwheel steamship operated by the Northern Transportation Company on the Mackenzie River system.

In 1910 the vessel carried the first buffalo to the new Buffalo National Park in Alberta.

In 1911 when the ice broke up in Lake Athabasca she competed with Athabasca River II in the rival fleet of the Hudson's Bay Company to see which vessel would be the first to travel from the railhead at Fort McMurray to Fort Fitzgerald, the southern terminus of the portage that connected the Mackenzie River system to the south.
