= Vermilion Falls =

Waterfall on the Peace River in Mackenzie County, Alberta, Canada

- nepegabeketik (Cree)
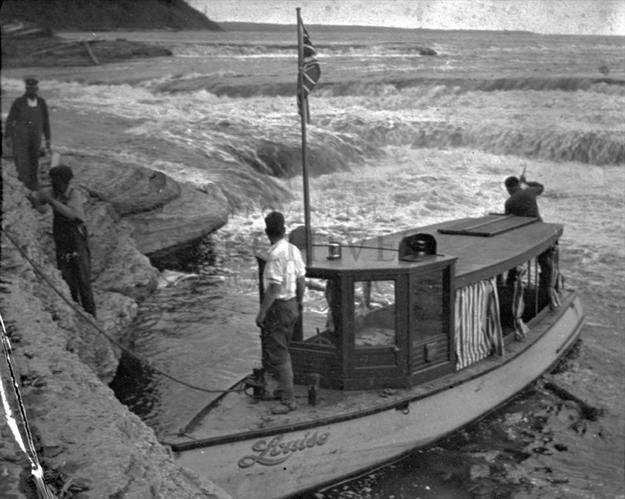
- Location: Alberta, Canada
- Coordinates: 58°22′11″N 114°52′18″W
- Type: Wide gradual cascade
- Total height: 4.6 m (15 ft)
- Average width: 1.8 km (6,000 ft)
- Watercourse: Peace River
- Average flow rate: 1,800 m^{3}/s (64,000 cu ft/s)

Vermilion Falls (French: chutes Vermilion; Cree: nepegabeketik, lit. 'where the water falls') is a waterfall on the Peace River in Alberta, Canada. It is the second largest waterfall in Canada by average flow rate after the Niagara Falls, and the largest entirely within the country. It is also the 6th widest waterfall in the world. The falls prevent the continuous navigation of the Peace River between its confluence with the Athabasca River and Hudson's Hope.

== Description ==
Vermilion Falls is a series of fan-shaped steps made of limestone and shale that vary from 4.6–7.6 m (15–25 ft) in height depending on the season. The falls are navigable by small, flat-bottomed boats during high water. During all other times boaters have to dock below the falls and walk along an 8-kilometre (5.0 mi) trail running parallel to the south bank of the river before joining up with the river above the falls.

A substantial stretch of rapids called Vermilion Rapids (Cree: meatina powistik, lit. 'the real rapids') lie 2.75 km (1.71 mi) upstream of the falls.

== See also ==
- List of waterfalls
- List of waterfalls by flow rate
- List of waterfalls of Canada
