= Radium Cruiser =

Canadian tugboat

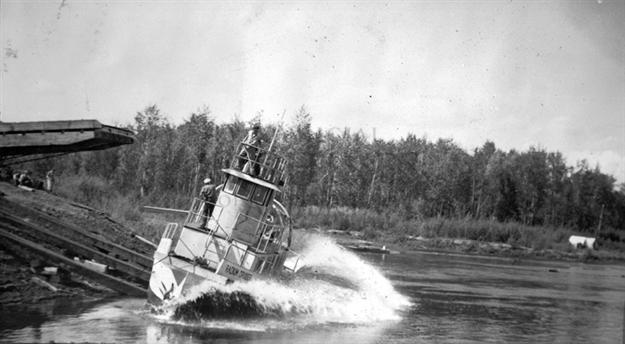
Launching the Radium Cruiser at Waterways, 1939.

The Radium Cruiser was a Russel Brothers tugboat operated on the Mackenzie River system for the "Radium Line". She was constructed in Owen Sound, Ontario, in 1939, then disassembled and shipped by rail to Waterways, Alberta. Waterways is a river port, and was then the northern terminus of the North American railway grid. Waterways is on the Clearwater River, not far upstream from where the river empties into Lake Athabasca. The waters of Lake Athabasca flow into Great Slave Lake down the Slave River, and then down the Mackenzie River to the Arctic Ocean.

A 16-mile series of large rapids at Fort Smith, NWT, on the Slave River, required a long portage. Most of the vessels of the Radium Line were reassembled at waterways, sailed to Fort Smith, then portaged overland to the lower river, and where they could navigate most of the tributaries of the Mackenzie River, and reach the Arctic Ocean without further portages. The Radium Cruiser, like the earlier Radium Queen, was intended to move cargo from the railhead to the Fort Smith portage, and to navigate the Athabasca River, Clearwater River, Peace River and Lake Athabasca and her tributaries.

Ice prevents navigation of the Mackenzie River for almost eight months of the year.

Like her sister ship, Radium Express, she was smaller than the Radium King and Radium Queen, just 60 feet (18 m) long.

In 2005 Atomic Energy of Canada published a study of the toxic legacy of the mining of radioactive ore at Port Radium. According to the report all but one of the surviving vessels of the Radium line were found to be free of contamination, with the exception of the Radium Gilbert, but the disposition of the Radium Cruiser was not known.
