= Radium (disambiguation) =

Radium is a chemical element with symbol Ra and atomic number 88.

Radium may also refer to:

== Places ==
- Radium, Colorado, United States
- Radium, Kansas, United States
- Radium, Minnesota, United States
- Radium, Virginia, United States
- Radium Hot Springs (British Columbia), Canada

== Computing ==
- Radium, software for Sirius Satellite Radio
- Radium, software for module files
- Radium (warez), a software piracy group

== Other uses ==
- Radium Futebol Clube, a Brazilian association football club
- Radium (Australian horse), an Australian campdrafting horse and sire
- Radium (British horse), a British Thoroughbred racehorse
- Radium (Ruoska album), 2005
- Radium (Either Orchestra album), 1988
- FiXT Radium, the Radium label from music company FiXT
- Radium Flour, a former brand of flour sold in Canada produced by the maker of Robin Hood Flour
- Radium Line, a marine transportation company operating out of Port Radium, NWT, Canada
- Radium weed, Euphorbia peplus, also known as Petty Spurge
- Radium Lavans, a fictional character from Zone of the Enders

== See also ==
- Ra (disambiguation)
- Radium Springs (disambiguation)
- Radium Queen (disambiguation)
- Radium Institute (disambiguation)
- Radium Express (disambiguation)
