= Radium Queen (ship) =

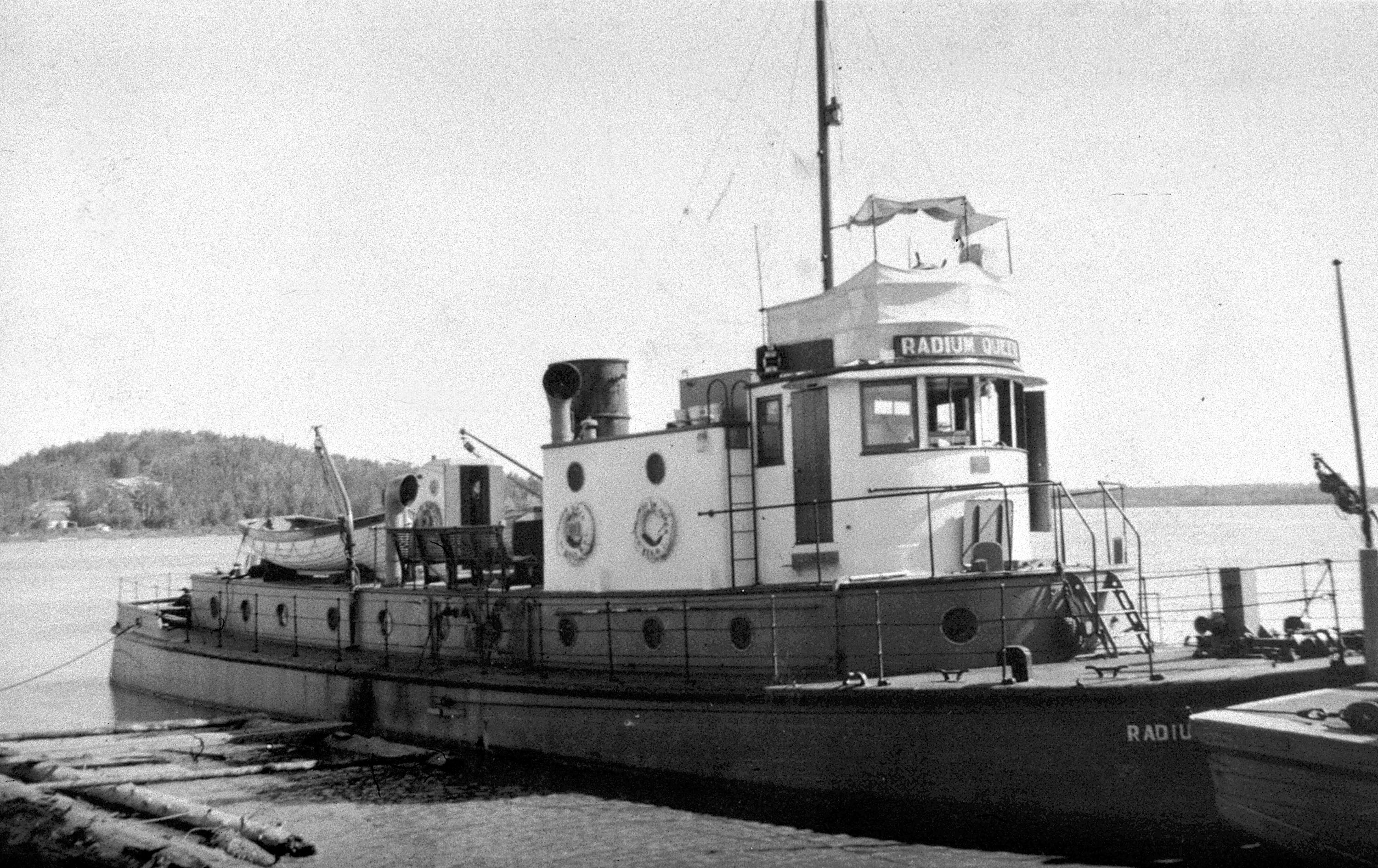
- The Radium Queen, at her northern terminus, Fort Fitzgerald on the upper Slave River.

History

Canada
- Name: Radium Queen
- Owner: Northern Transportation Company
- Operator: Northern Transportation Company
- Builder: Manseau Shipyards, Sorel
- Laid down: 1937
- Launched: Waterways, Alberta
- Completed: 1937
- Commissioned: as Radium Queen
- Homeport: Registered: Sorel, Quebec Actual:Registry closed
- Identification: IMO number: 5288932
- Fate: Decommissioned

General characteristics
- Class & type: Cargo/Tug
- Tonnage: 36 metric tons (35 long tons; 40 short tons)
- Length: 96 feet (29 m)
- Beam: 20 feet (6.1 m)
- Draught: 4 feet (1.2 m)
- Depth of hold: 108 metric tons (106 long tons; 119 short tons)
- Installed power: 2x 240 horsepower (180 kW) diesel engines, 9nhp 16-cylinder engine (1937), 500 horsepower (370 kW) engine (1957)
- Propulsion: Screw
- Crew: 10

The Radium Queen and her sister ship the Radium King were built in Sorel, Quebec in 1937, for the Northern Transportation Company, a subsidiary of Eldorado Gold Mines. The Radium Queen was a cargo/tug ship that served on the Slave River. It made runs between Lake Athabaska and Great Slave Lake which is generally navigable. The Radium Queen towed barges from the railhead at Waterways, Alberta to a portage around the rapids. Cargo was unloaded there and transported by land, and loaded on barges on the lower river that were towed by the Radium King, and later by other tugboats, like the Radium Charles, Radium Express and Radium Yellowknife.

It was built at the Manseau Shipyards, then disassembled and shipped by railroad to Waterways. The Radium Queen was shipped first, and reassembled at Waterways, so she could tow the parts to assemble the Radium King downstream to the rapids on the Slave River. The parts to the Radium King were then portaged around the rapids to be assembled on the lower reaches.

In 2005 Atomic Energy of Canada published a study of the toxic legacy of the mining of radioactive ore at Port Radium. According to the report all but one of the surviving vessels of the Radium Line were found to be free of contamination, with the exception of the Radium Gilbert, but whether the Radium Queen had been contaminated could not be determined, as she had been scrapped.
