= Radium Yellowknife =

Canadian tugboat

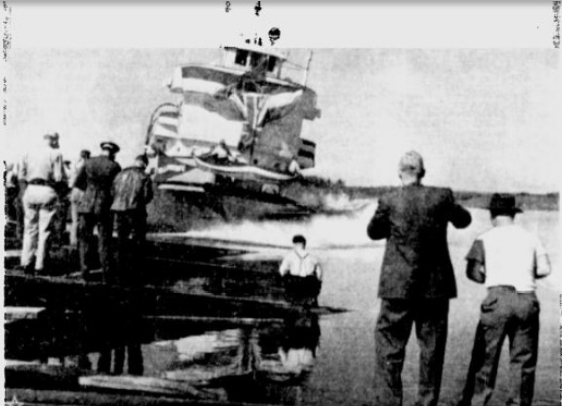
Launch of the Radium Yellowknife at Waterways Alberta.

The Radium Yellowknife is a Canadian tugboat. Like other vessels built for service on the Mackenzie River, its tributaries, and Great Bear Lake and Great Slave Lake, she was first built in a shipyard in Vancouver, British Columbia, then disassembled and shipped by rail to Waterways, Alberta. There she was reassembled and launched into Clearwater River on August 18, 1948 - late in the season, as the rivers used to freeze in late September or early October. Her reassembly was delayed initially by floods in the Fraser valley in May hindering transport, and then by a derailment of several of the railway cars carrying her components. After launch, she sailed to the portage on the Slave River at Fort Smith, Northwest Territories and was dragged overland across the portage to the lower river, where she could then access the Great Slave Lake, the MacKenzie River, and the Beaufort Sea.

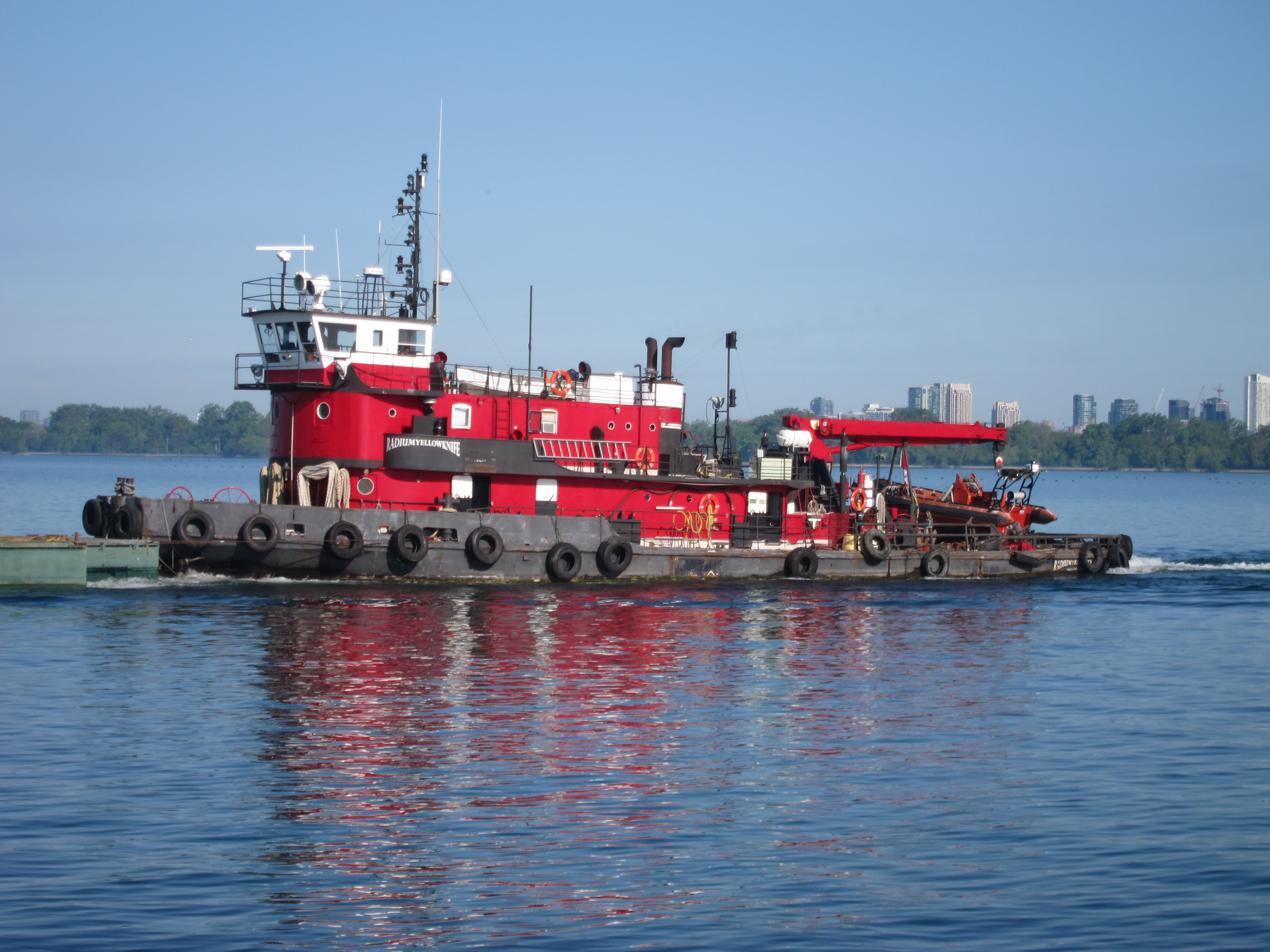
Radium Yellowknife outside Toronto Harbour, 2017.

When she was launched she was the fifteenth and largest vessel operated by the Northern Transportation Line – also known as the "Radium Line" as many of the vessels contained the prefix "radium" in their name. One of the fleet's most important ports of call was Port Radium, on Great Bear Lake, the source of much of the uranium used by the Manhattan Project during World War II.

The spring thaw comes late on the Mackenzie River and her tributaries. In 1950, she arrived at Hay River on June 15. In 1953, the Radium Yellowknife was frozen-in at Norman Wells on Great Slave Lake as late as June 8.

In 2003, she transited the Northwest Passage, overwintering in Iqaluit, Nunavut, when the ice came early. Since then she has served on the Great Lakes.

Radium Yellowknife at Toronto

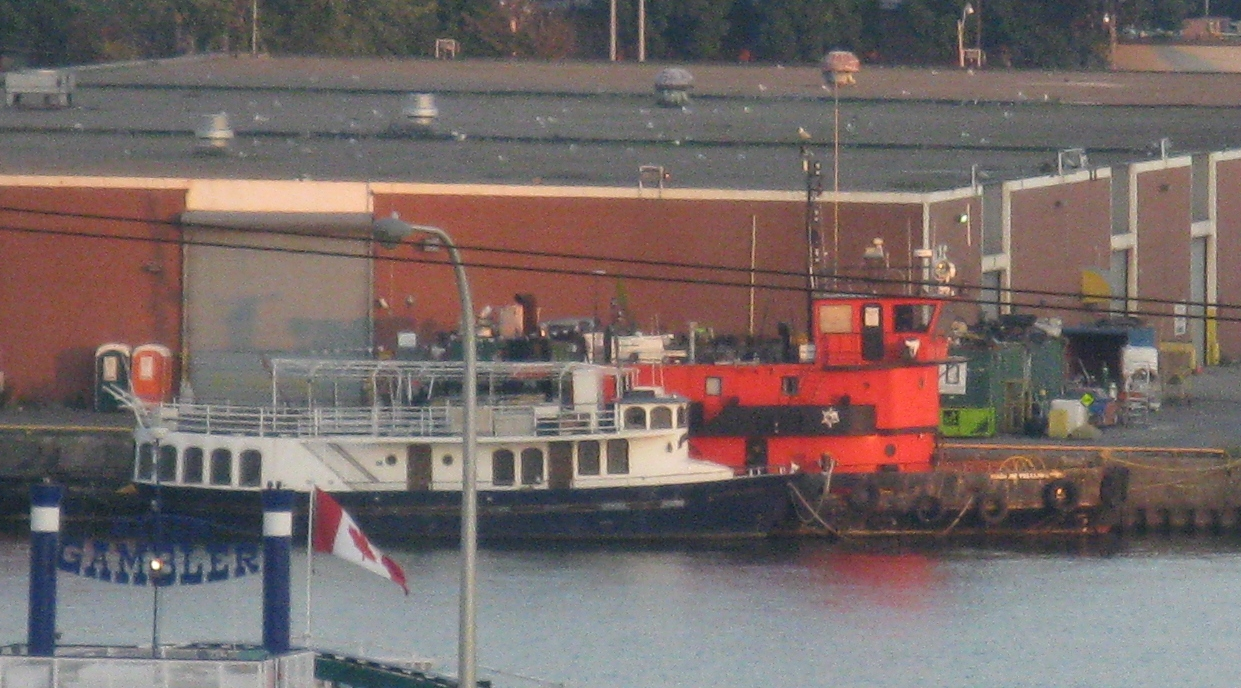
Moored in Toronto Harbour.

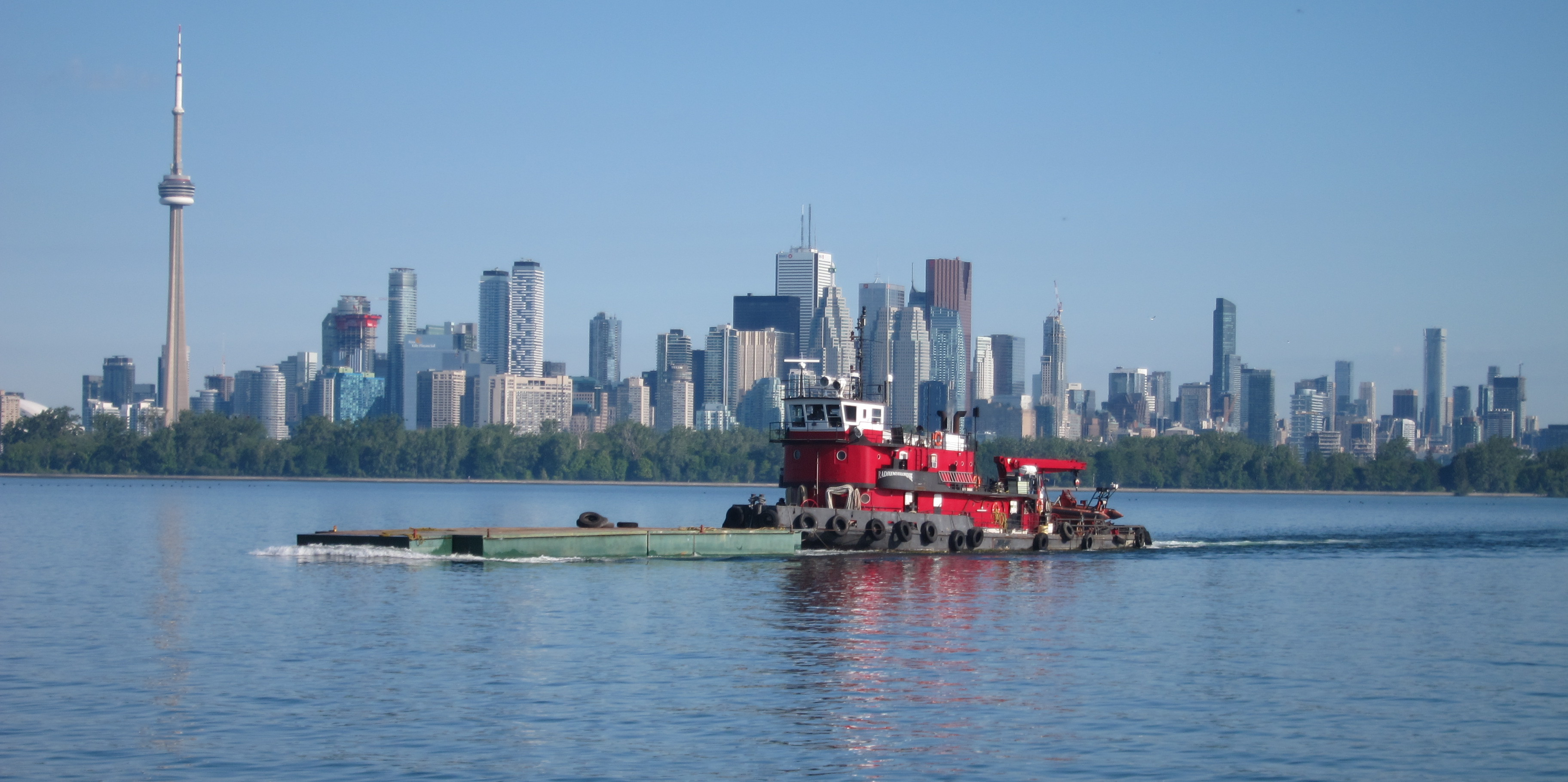
Leaving port against skyline.

specifications
tonnage	235 tonnes
length	40 metres (130 ft)
draft	1.6 metres (5 ft 3 in)
beam	8.6 metres (28 ft)
IMO number	5288956
power	2 × 750-horsepower diesels
launched	1948

In 2005 Atomic Energy of Canada published a study of the toxic legacy of the mining of radioactive ore at Port Radium. According to the report of the Radium Yellowknife and all the other surviving vessels of the Radium line were found to be free of contamination, with the exception of the Radium Gilbert.

The boat was used in the fictional television drama The Handmaid's Tale Season 4 Episode "Vows", portraying a vessel used by a humanitarian agency sending supplies to Chicago from Canada.
