= Radium Queen =

Radium Queen may refer to:

- Radium Queen (ship), a tugboat of Northern Transportation Company, serving on the upper Slave River
- Radium Queen (sternwheeler)—see Steamboats of the upper Columbia and Kootenay Rivers

== See also ==
- Radium King
