= MV Robert W. =

Diesel tugboat

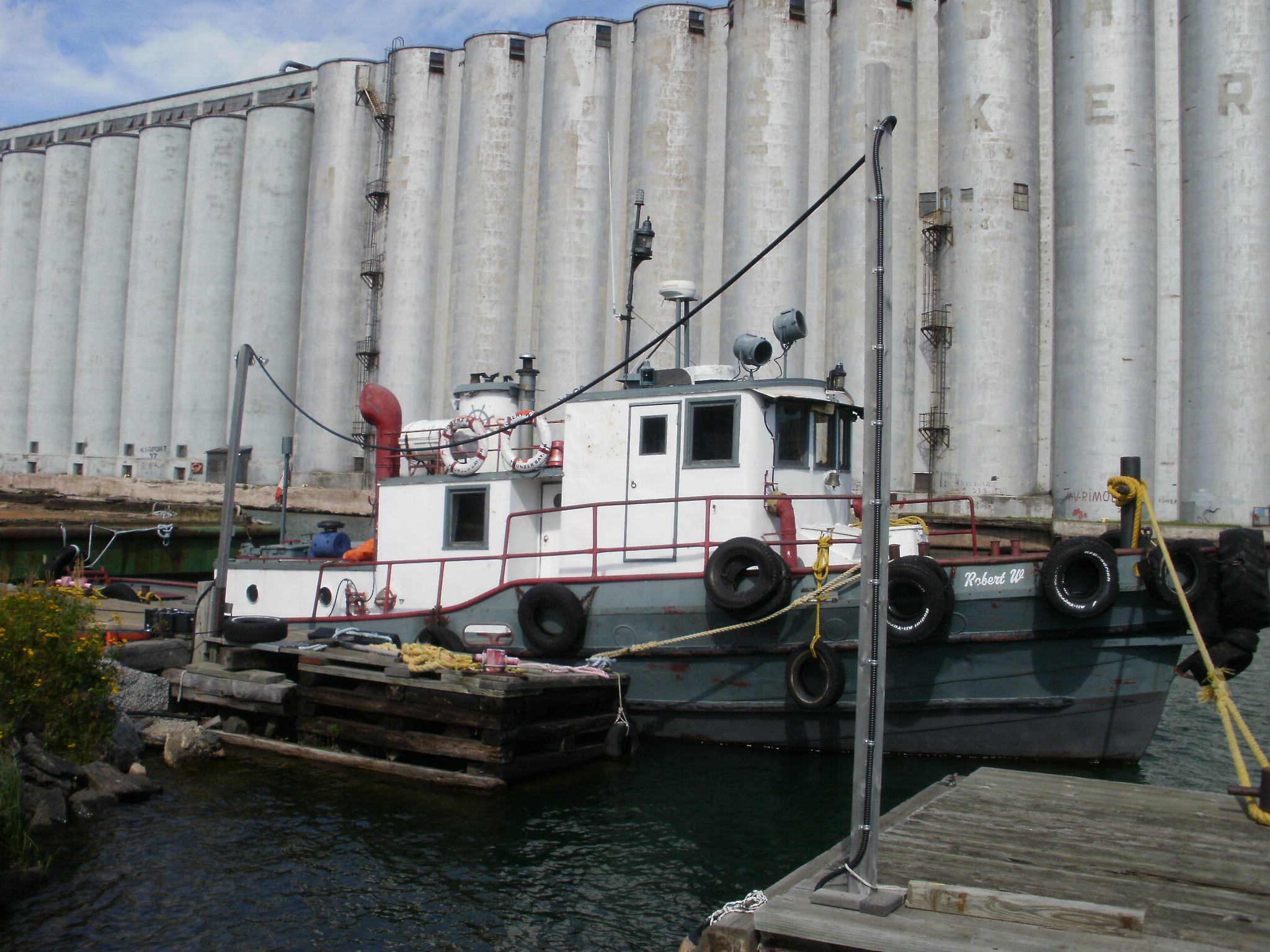
- Robert W. at dock.

History
- Name: MV Robert W.
- Owner: Long Lac Pulp & Paper Co. Ltd (1948–1990); Thunder Bay Marine Services/Thunder Bay Tug Services (1990-)
- Builder: Russel Brothers Ltd., Owen Sound, Canada
- Launched: 1948
- Identification: Official number: 190027
- Status: in active service, as of 2022

General characteristics
- Type: Tugboat
- Tonnage: 48.52 GT; 29.51 NT
- Length: 17.07 m (56 ft 0 in)
- Beam: 4.88 m (16 ft 0 in)
- Depth: 2.53 m (8 ft 4 in)
- Installed power: Lister ST2 diesel genset.
- Propulsion: 2 × 400 hp (298 kW) Cummins NT380-M 6-cylinder diesel engines; 2 × shafts
- Speed: 10 knots (19 km/h; 12 mph)
- Complement: 6
- Notes: 4-ton bollard pull

M/V Robert W. is a tugboat that was built by the Russel Brothers Ltd. shipbuilding company in Owen Sound, Ontario, in 1948. The tug is 60 feet long, 16 feet wide, 8 feet 4 inches in depth, and of 48.5 gross tons. It was originally powered by two Cummins NHMS 6-cylinder marine diesel engines originally producing 175 hp each but has been repowered with 2 cummins model NT380M marine engines producing approximately 400 BHP each; the tug originally had a Sheppard 32-volt DC diesel generator for auxiliary power but has been replaced in the mid-1990s with a Lister Diesel model ST2 2-cylinder air-cooled diesel 120-volt AC generator. It was built in 1948 for the Long Lac Pulp & Paper Co. Ltd in Toronto, Ontario, until purchased by Thunder Bay Marine Services in Thunder Bay, Ontario, in 1990. In 2 locations on the Robert W. there are factory brass plaques that state the vessel is boat number 791, length is 60 feet, beam is 16 feet, and year 1948.

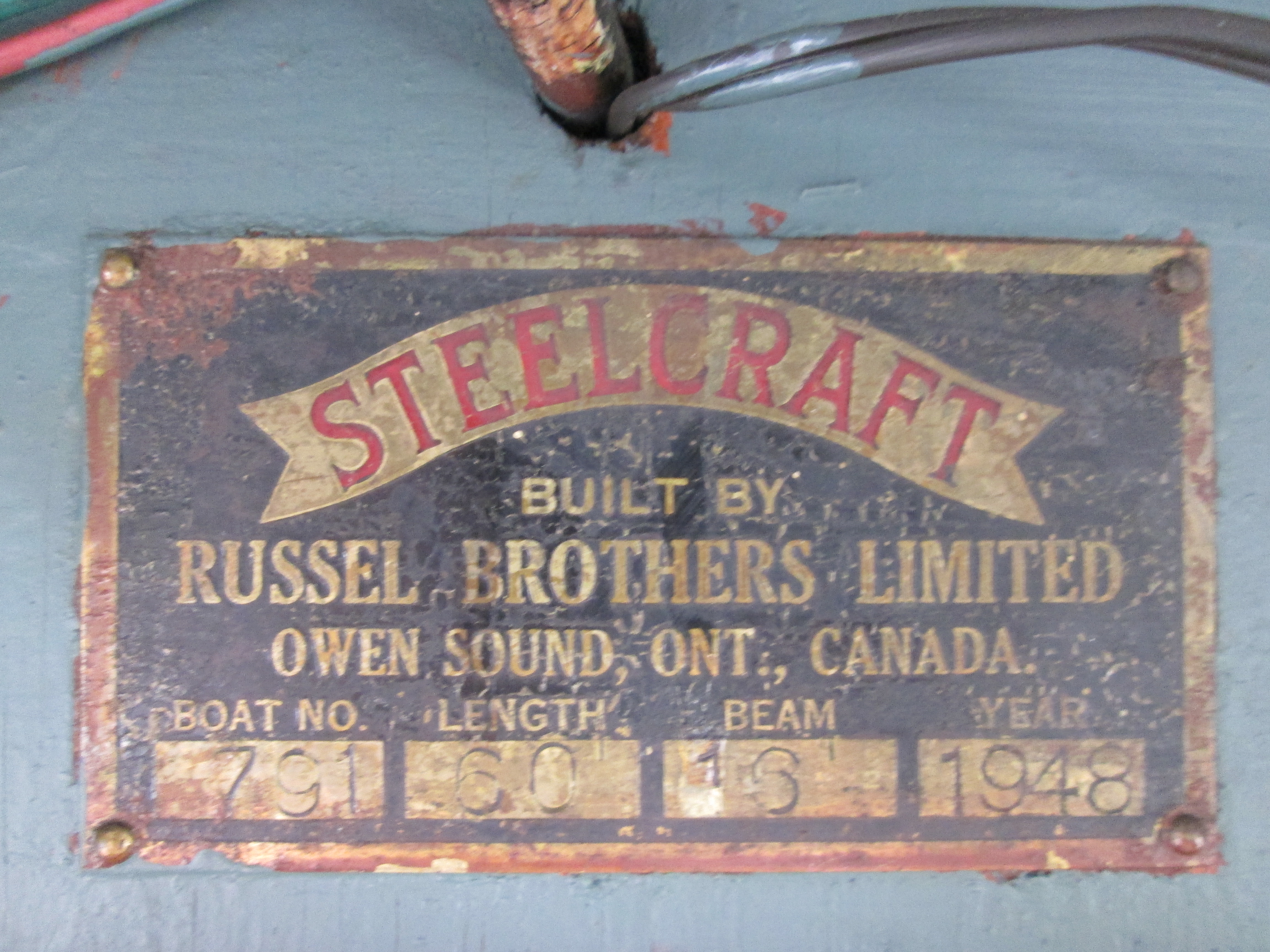

== See also ==
- MV Point Valour
- MV Glenada
- MV Miseford
