= Glenada =

Glenada may refer to:

- MV Glenada, a tugboat, built for the Royal Canadian Navy, then active for decades as a civilian vessel
- SS Glenada, a steamboat, built in 1904, that operated on the Magnetawan River, in Ontario
- Glenada, Oregon
