= Radium King =

Coordinates: 60.004827°N 111.888603°W

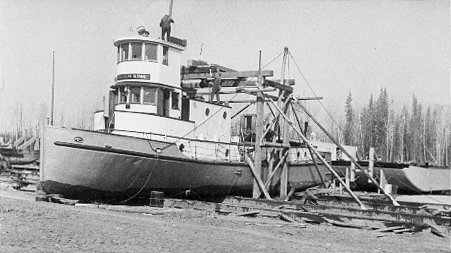
- Reassembly of the Radium King, 1937.

History

Canada
- Name: Radium King
- Operator: Northern Transportation Company
- Builder: Manseau Shipyards, Montreal
- Laid down: 1937
- Completed: 1937
- Commissioned: as Radium King
- Decommissioned: 1967
- Identification: IMO number: 5288906
- Status: Museum Ship, Northern Life Museum in Fort Smith, Northwest Territories.

General characteristics
- Length: 96 feet (29 m)
- Beam: 20 feet (6.1 m)
- Draught: 4 feet (1.2 m)
- Installed power: 2 x 240 horsepower (180 kW) diesel engines
- Crew: 10

The Radium King was built in 1937 to haul ore on the Mackenzie River, and her tributaries. This included uranium used in the US atom bombs of World War II. Later in her active career she hauled barges on Great Slave Lake.

The Radium King, and a sister ship, the Radium Queen, were built in the Manseau shipyards in Montreal. They were then disassembled and the pieces were loaded on flatcars for shipment by railroad to Waterways, Alberta, which was then the northern terminus of the North American railway grid, to be reassembled and launched on the Mackenzie River. It required nine flatcars to completely load all the parts of the vessel. The Radium King was staffed by a crew of 10, and could carry 10 passengers.

The shipping season was short during the working lifetime of the Radium King. In 1942 she was to be the last vessel to make the round trip down the Mackenzie River, and had to leave on August 17, in order arrive back on time. On November 16, 1945, the Radium King and the Radium Express were caught by freeze up in Yellowknife. The Edmonton Journal reported in 1953 that the Radium King was the first vessel to cross Great Slave Lake—arriving in Yellowknife on June 8. While the lake's ice had broken up, it hadn't moved out.

Northern Transportation added additional vessels to her fleet, many of which, like the Radium Charles and Radium Yellowknife also bore the prefix "Radium", and the line was known locally as the "Radium Line".

In 1956 the Radium King survived the explosion of mining supplies on a barge she was towing.

In 1959 noted English professor Hugh MacLennan described a trip he took down the Mackenzie on the Radium King for Maclean's magazine. He said the vessel was suddenly frozen in, on Great Slave Lake, for over a week, due to a sudden cold snap at the beginning of the shipping season in 1958.

In 1967 the boat was retired. Currently she is on display outside the Northern Life Museum in Fort Smith, Northwest Territories. The Radium King was restored, and turned into a museum.

In 2005 Atomic Energy of Canada published a study of the toxic legacy of the mining of radioactive ore at Port Radium. According to the report the Radium King and all the other surviving vessels of the Radium line were found to be free of contamination, with the exception of the Radium Gilbert.
