= MV Point Valour =

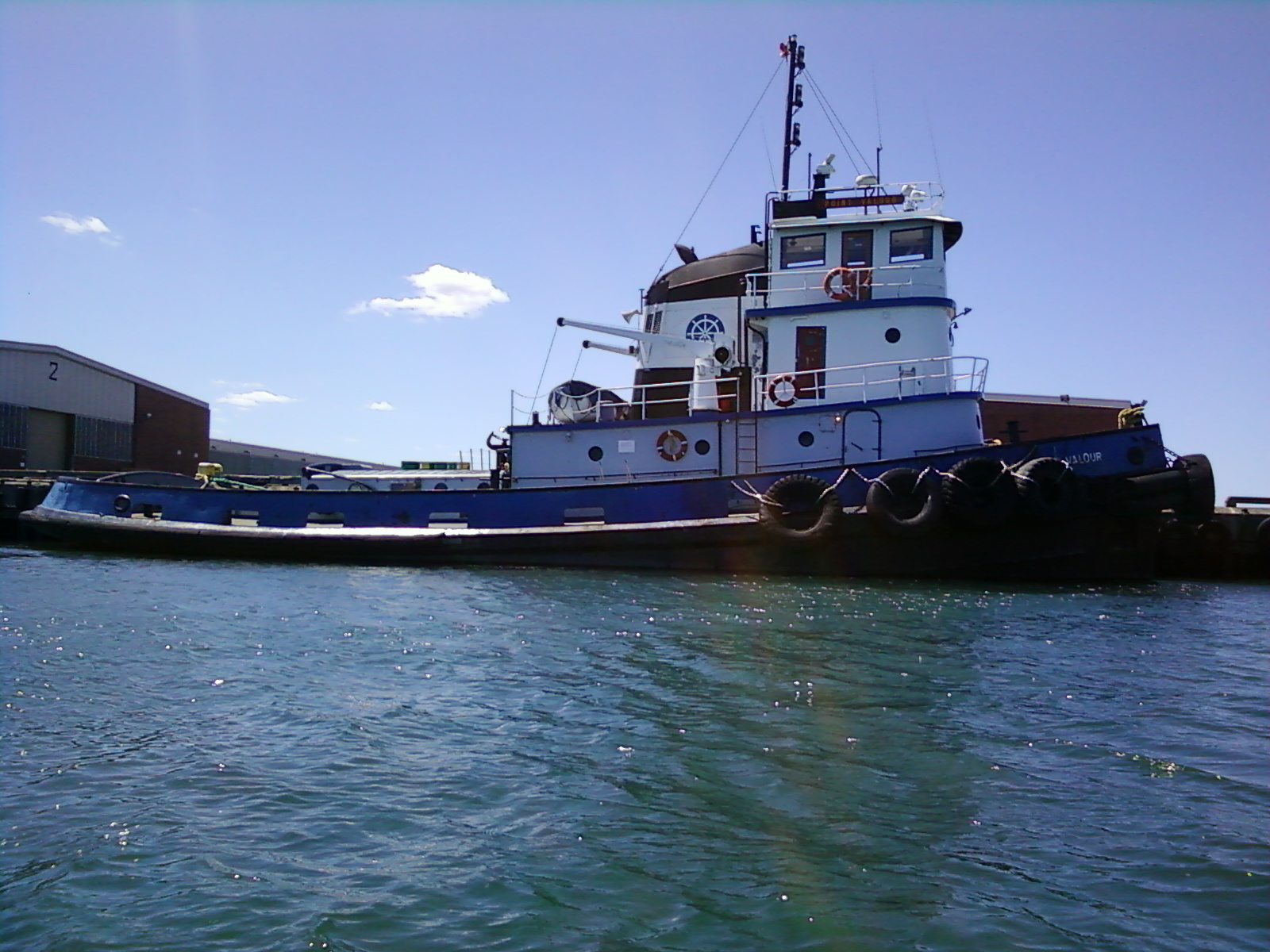
- Starboard (right) side of the Point Valour.

History

Canada
- Name: Point Valour
- Operator: Thunder Bay Tug Services LTD.
- Port of registry: Thunder Bay, Ontario
- Builder: Davie Shipbuilding, Lauzon
- Launched: Sept. 1958
- Completed: 1958
- Renamed: 1958–1973 Foundation Valour, 1973-Present Point Valour
- Identification: IMO number: 5118759; MMSI number: 316032539; Callsign: VC3237

General characteristics
- Class & type: Tugboat
- Tonnage: 247 gross tons
- Length: 30 m (98 ft 5 in)
- Beam: 8.90 m (29 ft 2 in)
- Draft: 3.96 m (13 ft 0 in)
- Propulsion: Fairbanks Morse 38d-8 1/8x10" OP 8cyl. 2 stroke diesel 1280hp
- Speed: 11 knots (20 km/h; 13 mph)
- Complement: 3

The Point Valour is a Canadian tug which was built by the Davie Shipbuilding Company in 1958 and is hull # 621. The Point Valour was originally ordered by the Foundation Maritime company and the original name was the Foundation Valour. There are two other "sister" boats to the Valour and the original names are Foundation Victor (Ex Jerry Newberry, currently R. J. Ballott ) and the Foundation Vibert (currently Florence M.). The Point Valour is 98' long by 28' wide, but because of the rubber strips and the tires which are chained to the side of the bulwarks to act as bumpers the tug is approximately 104' long by approximately 30' wide and has a reinforcing hull able to break ice up to five feet thick. The propeller on this tug measure approximately 9' straight across. Unlike many other tugs which are "modernized", there has been very little done to this tug - most of it is all original from 1958.

== History ==
In 1973 when the Foundation Maritime company sold their tug fleet, they renamed the company Eastern Canada Towing Ltd. and when they sold the tug fleet they renamed the tugs from "Foundation" to "Point". In 1992 Thunder Bay Tug Services purchased the Point Valour and has since become one of the main work boats for Thunder Bay Tug Services. The Point Valour is also known for bringing the historical James Whalen tugboat back to Thunder Bay in 1992.

While the tug was on the east coast it inspired the children's TV show Theodore The Tugboat.

== See also ==
- MV Glenada
- MV Miseford
- MV Robert W.
- Fairbanks Morse
- Detroit Diesel
- Davie Shipbuilding
- Thunder Bay
