= HBC Wrigley =

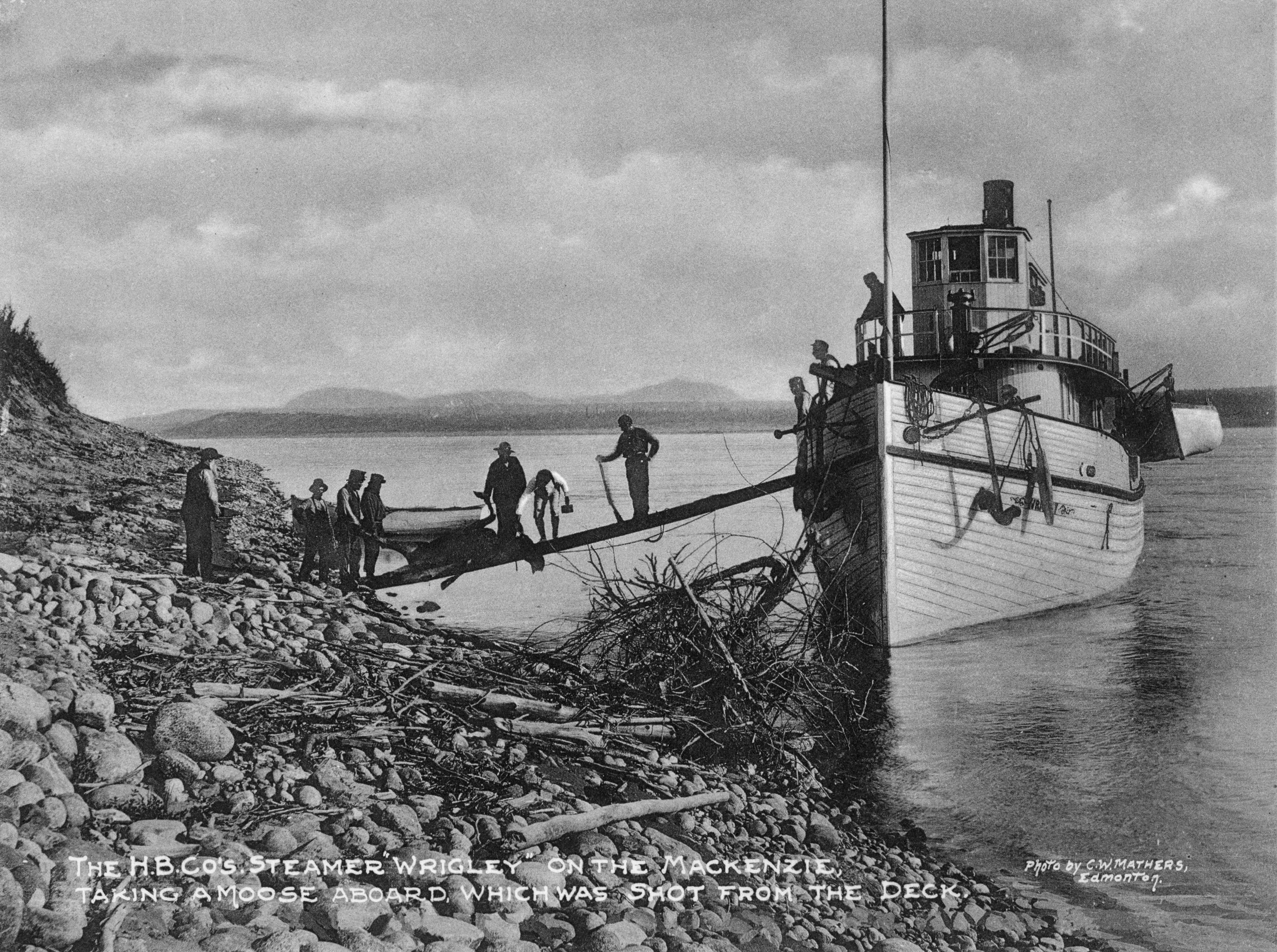
The Wrigley was built so she could load and unload by beaching herself on the shore where no docks existed.

The Wrigley was a wooden steamship operated by the Hudson's Bay Company on the Mackenzie River, and its tributaries, including the Peel River, Great Slave Lake, and the lower reaches of the Slave River.

She was built on the Slave River, downstream of the very large rapids between Fort Smith and Fitzgerald, Alberta, in 1885. Her steam engine and other components would have had to have been shipped from central Canada, and hauled over the 16 miles (26 km) portage. Her hull was built from Spruce, harvested locally. She was screw-propelled, and drew approximately 5 to 6 feet, "when fully laden". Her length is not stated in any official documents however she was 14 feet (4.3 m) wide and displaced 60 tons.

According to documents from the Senate of Canada she was one of just three steamships on the Mackenzie River system, and the only one downstream of the Fort Smith-Fort Resolution rapids.

In August 1889 the Wrigley surveyed shallows "50 miles downstream from Fort Good Hope" and found the deepest passage she could find was "one fathom".

Vilhjalmur Stefansson, author of My Life With the Eskimo described a voyage on the Wrigley. He wrote that she coped with frequently running aground on the river's shifting sandbars she carried her heaviest cargo, like lead shot, right in her bow. Then, when she ran aground, she could be set free by moving that heavy cargo to her stern. He wrote she only had room for six passengers.
