= Northern Life Museum =

Northern Life Museum and Cultural Centre
- Location within Northwest Territories
- Established: 1964
- Location: 110 King Street, Fort Smith Northwest Territories, Canada
- Coordinates: 60.0053°N 111.8877°W
- Type: Rural history museum
- Director: Daniel Stewart
- Website: Official Northern Life Museum Website

The Northern Life Museum is in Fort Smith, Northwest Territories, Canada. The museum has a collection of over 13,000 artifacts representing the peoples and history of the North. Many of the artifacts were collected by the Oblate Fathers and the Grey Nuns during their missionary work in the North.

== History ==
The artifacts were first displayed in 1964 in the basement of Grandin College. In 1972, the Northern Anthropological and Cultural Society was formed in Fort Smith with the purpose of promoting, building and maintaining a museum. The Northern Life Museum is the oldest museum in the Northwest Territories.

== Collection ==
The outside gallery is home to a collection of agriculture equipment and machinery that was used in and around Fort Smith. This exhibit includes a Holt tractor that was brought north in 1919 to work the portage route between Fort Fitzgerald and Fort Smith. It also includes the Radium King, a vessel used first to haul uranium and radium ore and then later to push barges.

The Northern Life Museum displays are built around 5 themes. It hosts displays of an authentic northern trading post, a typical northern kitchen from the 1940s, 2 mounted adult bison, a traditional trapper's cabin, a 1965 Polaris Sno-Traveler, and a river bank scene featuring a birch bark canoe.

The Northern Life Museum also hosts a whooping crane display. The last remaining natural migratory flock of whooping cranes in the world nest in and around Wood Buffalo National Park. Canus was discovered as an injured chick by researchers in 1964. Unable to be released back into the wild, Canus (named after the joint CANadian/US effort) took up residence at Patuxent Wildlife Refuge in Maryland as the first participant in their new captive breeding program. The program enjoyed great success and Canus' contribution brought him international recognition. Canus was welcomed in 2004 as a part of the Northern Life Museum's permanent exhibits.

The museum also hosts an outdoor aboriginal cultural Centre that showcases Canada's first peoples' ways of traditional living before European contact occurred in the early 1800s. It host as functional cold cache, smokehouse and tipi for public use.

There is a virtual tour that can be found online, though the displays have changed significantly since this tour was posted.

== Affiliations ==
The Museum is affiliated with: CMA, CHIN, and Virtual Museum of Canada.
