= Glen-class tug (1943) =

Class of tugboats

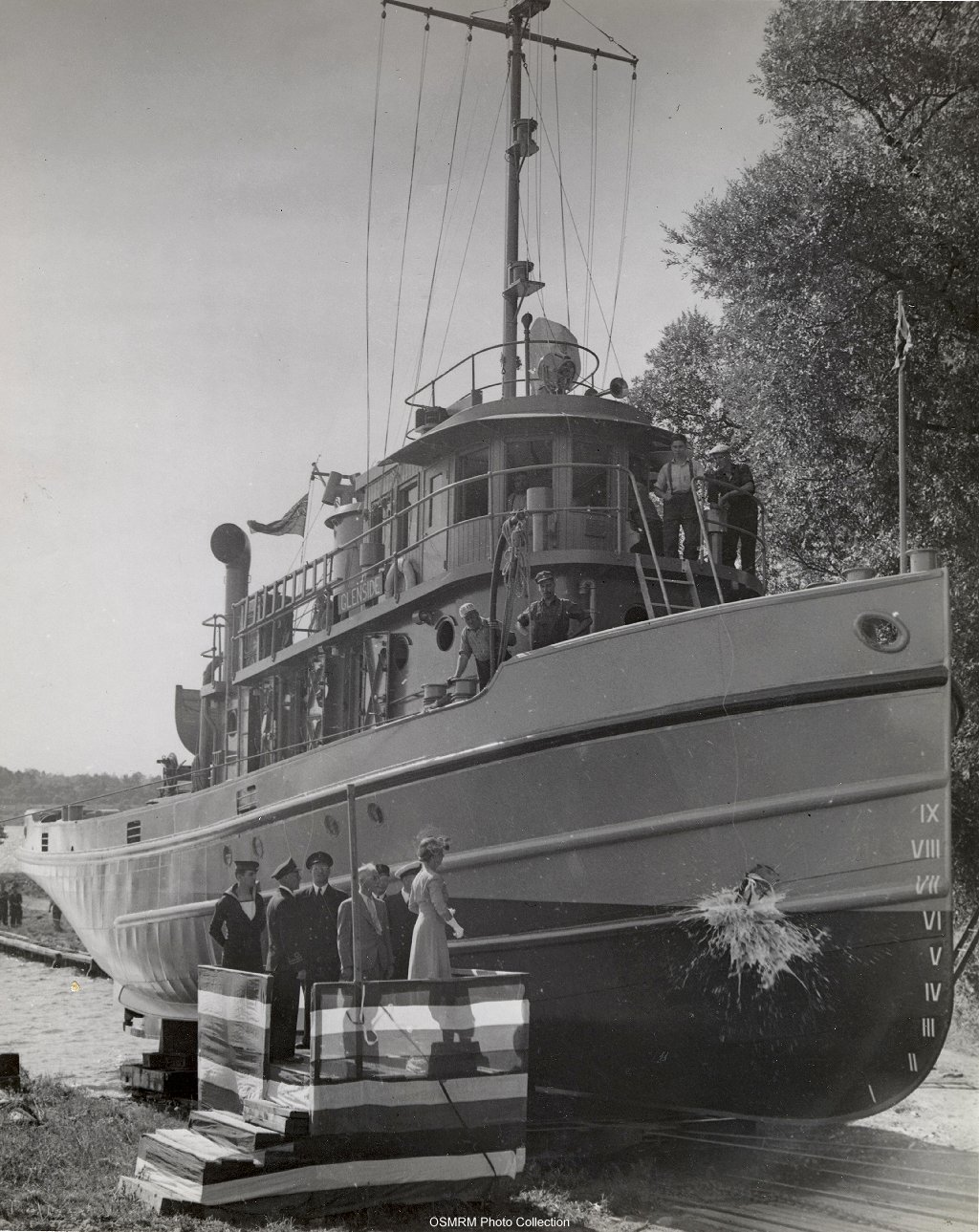
- Launch of the Second World War tugboat HMCS Glenside.

Class overview
- Name: Glen class
- Operators: Royal Canadian Navy
- Built: 1943–1945
- In commission: 1943–1979
- Completed: 20

General characteristics
- Type: Tugboat
- Displacement: Steel-hulled : 170 long tons (173 t); Wooden-hulled : 155 long tons (157 t)
- Length: Steel-hulled : 80 ft 6 in (24.54 m); Wooden-hulled : 80 ft (24 m)
- Beam: Steel-hulled : 20 ft 7 in (6.27 m); Wooden-hulled : 18 ft 4 in (5.59 m)
- Draught: Steel-hulled : 9 ft 8 in (2.95 m); Wooden-hulled : 10 ft 4 in (3.15 m)
- Propulsion: Steel-hulled : Long House-type; 1 × 320 hp (239 kW) Vivian 8-cylinder diesel engine (400 hp (298 kW) with supercharger); Short House-type; 1 × 400 hp (298 kW) Enterprise 6-cylinder diesel engine; Wooden-hulled : Glendevon & Glendon : 1 × Vivian 6-cylinder diesel engine; Glenholme : 1 × Enterprise 6-cylinder diesel engine

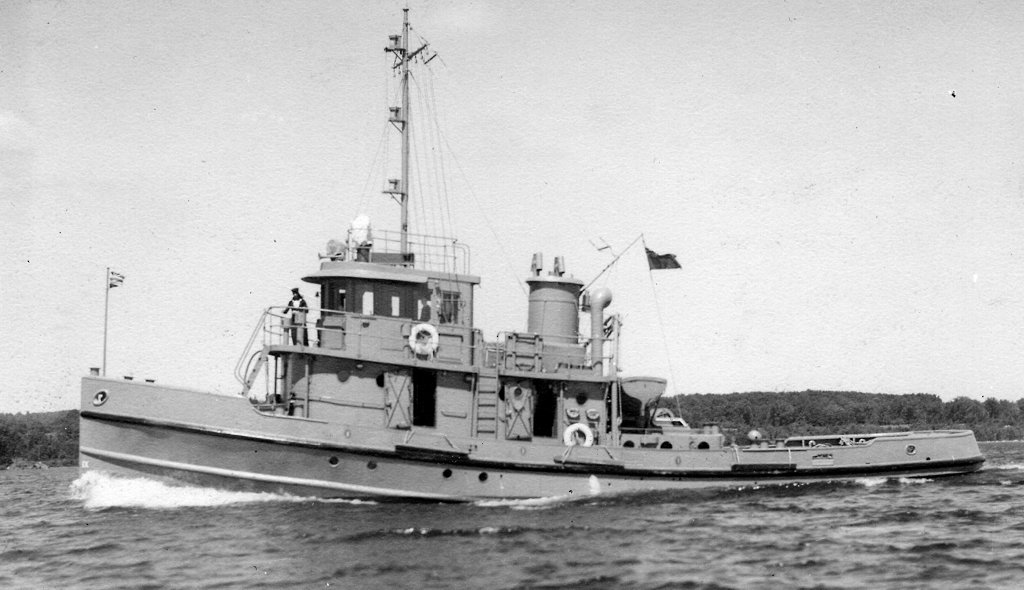
Glenside at sea.

The Glen-class tugs were a class of tugboats of the Royal Canadian Navy built during the Second World War. There were three designs of the tugboat; two were of steel-hulled construction and the other was wooden-hulled. Of the 20 of the class built, 16 were of the steel-hulled type; 11 built by Russel Bros. of Owen Sound, Ontario and 5 by Canadian Dredge & Dock Co., Kingston, Ontario. Of the four wooden-hulled type; three were built by McKenzie Barge and Derrick, Vancouver, British Columbia, and one by LeBlanc Shipbuilding, Weymouth, Nova Scotia. All but one – Glendyne – were sold into commercial service after the war.

== Ships ==
Steel-hulled Long House type

- M/V Glenada, launched 23 November 1943, sold post-war. Owned by Sandrin Bros., Sarnia, Ontario, until 1995.
- Glendower, launched 19 May 1943, commissioned 18 June 1943. Sold in 1946. Renamed E. A. Rockett (1946–1976), then Paul E. No. 1 (1976–2007). Owned by LeBrun Constructors, Ltd., Thunder Bay, Ontario, since 1983.
- Glenora, launched 18 September 1943. Sold post-war. Renamed Lotbiniere and then Glenshiel. Owned by Glenshiel Towing Co, Ltd., Vancouver to 2004.
- Glenmont, launched 27 October 1943. Sold to the Province of Newfoundland's Ministry of Public Works in 1947. Sold mid-1980s. In 1997 owned by Shepherd Boats Ltd. Rexdale, Ontario. Sold, rebuilt as a charter ship and renamed Carolina Borealis in 2002.
- Glenlea, launched 20 July 1943. Sold to Foundation Maritime Ltd. in 1947 and renamed Bansaga. Sold to Gravel & Lake Services Ltd., Thunder Bay, Ontario, in 1964 and renamed George N. Carleton. Still in service in 2008.

Steel-hulled Short House type

- Glenbrook, launched 23 September 1944, sold post-war. Rebuilt in 1980 while owned by McKeil Work Boats Ltd., Hamilton, Ontario. Sold in 2000.
- Glencove, launched 10 June 1944, commissioned 7 July 1944. Sold in 1946 to Anticosti Shipping Company, Montreal, and renamed Consol II. Sold to Canadian Dredge and Dock Co., Midland, Ontario, in 1953 and renamed Glen Rover. Sold 1986. In 2006 was for sale through Newcastle Boat Brokers Ltd., Nanaimo, British Columbia Currently owned and operated by Star Marine in Seattle Washington under the name Glen Cove.
- Glendyne was launched in 1945 to serve at Halifax. She was sunk in 1957 while berthing the aircraft carrier HMCS Magnificent, but was re-floated a few days later, returning to serve the navy until retired in 1979.
- Glenevis, launched 21 October 1944 and sold post-war. In 1994 she was owned by McKeil Work Boats Ltd., Hamilton, Ontario. Sold in 2007.
- Glenlivet, launched 11 July 1944, and commissioned 21 July 1944. In 1947 she was loaned to the Canadian Ministry of Public Works, and was renamed Glenlivet II. She was returned to the Navy in December 1973. Sold in 1977 to Francisco Petroleum Enterprises Inc. and renamed Canadian Franco. Reverted to Glenlivet II in 1984, and owned by Nadro Marine, Port Dover, Ontario, since 2001.
- Glenside, launched 22 August 1944. Sold post-war, she was acquired from Remorqueurs et Barges Montreal Ltd., Valleyfield, Quebec, by McKeil Marine Ltd. Rebuilt in 1979, she was sold in 1998, and renamed Tycoon was working in Nassau, Bahamas.

Plus five built by Canadian Dredge & Dock Co., types and names unknown.

Wooden-hulled type

- Glendevon, currently under restoration.
- Glendon
- Glenholme
- Glenwood
