= Radium Springs =

Radium Springs may refer to:

== Canada ==
- Radium Hot Springs, British Columbia, a village in British Columbia
  - Radium Hot Springs Airport

== United States ==
- Radium Springs, Georgia
- Radium Springs, New Mexico
- Radium Hot Springs, Colorado
- Radium Sulphur Springs, Los Angeles
- Alternative name for White Point Hot Springs, California
- Alternative name for Keough Hot Springs, California

== See also ==
- Radium (disambiguation)
