= MV Miseford =

1915 Canadian tugboat

History
- Name: MV Miseford
- Builder: M. Beatty & Sons Ltd., Welland, Canada
- Launched: 1915
- Identification: IMO number: 8745345

General characteristics
- Class & type: Former Ministry of Game & Fisheries for the Province of Ontario (1922–1940) tugboat
- Tonnage: 114 GT
- Length: 24.39 m (80 ft 0 in)
- Beam: 6.1 m (20 ft 0 in)
- Draught: 3 m (9 ft 10 in)
- Propulsion: 4 × Detroit Diesel 6-71 engine's, 680 hp (507 kW); 1 × propeller
- Speed: 11 knots (20 km/h; 13 mph)
- Complement: 4

MV Miseford is a tugboat built in 1915 by M. Beatty & Sons Ltd. in Welland, Ontario.

Miseford is 80 feet long, 20 feet wide and has a draught of 9.42 feet. It measures 114 gross tons and was originally powered by a triple-expansion steam engine with two coal-fired boilers (make, size, and info unknown). The hull is riveted plate steel from when the tug was originally made. This tug was originally built for Alvin J. Misener & Erwin G. Tedford (owned from 1915 to 1922); then it was in possession of the Minister of Game & Fisheries for the Province of Ontario (from 1922 to 1940). Since then it has been sold a few times, until 2005, when it was purchased by Thunder Bay Tug Services.

MV Miseford

On November 4, 1965, the Miseford was driven aground by strong winds in the St. Marys River. It was salvaged in 1966. The tug was rebuilt and re-powered with a Detroit Diesel Quad-71 power pack, which has 4 Detroit Diesel 6-71 marine engines producing approximately 680 hp, mounted on a single gearbox in 1953, 2 Caterpillar D311 (4-cylinder) diesel generators producing 30 KW each, and a Perkins 4-cylinder diesel hydraulic pump to power the hydraulic bow thruster.

As of 2005, Miseford is operating in Thunder Bay as a harbor tug owned by Thunder Bay Tug Services along with two other tugs, MV Glenada and MV Point Valour.

== See also ==
- MV Point Valour
- MV Glenada
- MV Robert W.
