= Radium Express (ship) =

Tugboat

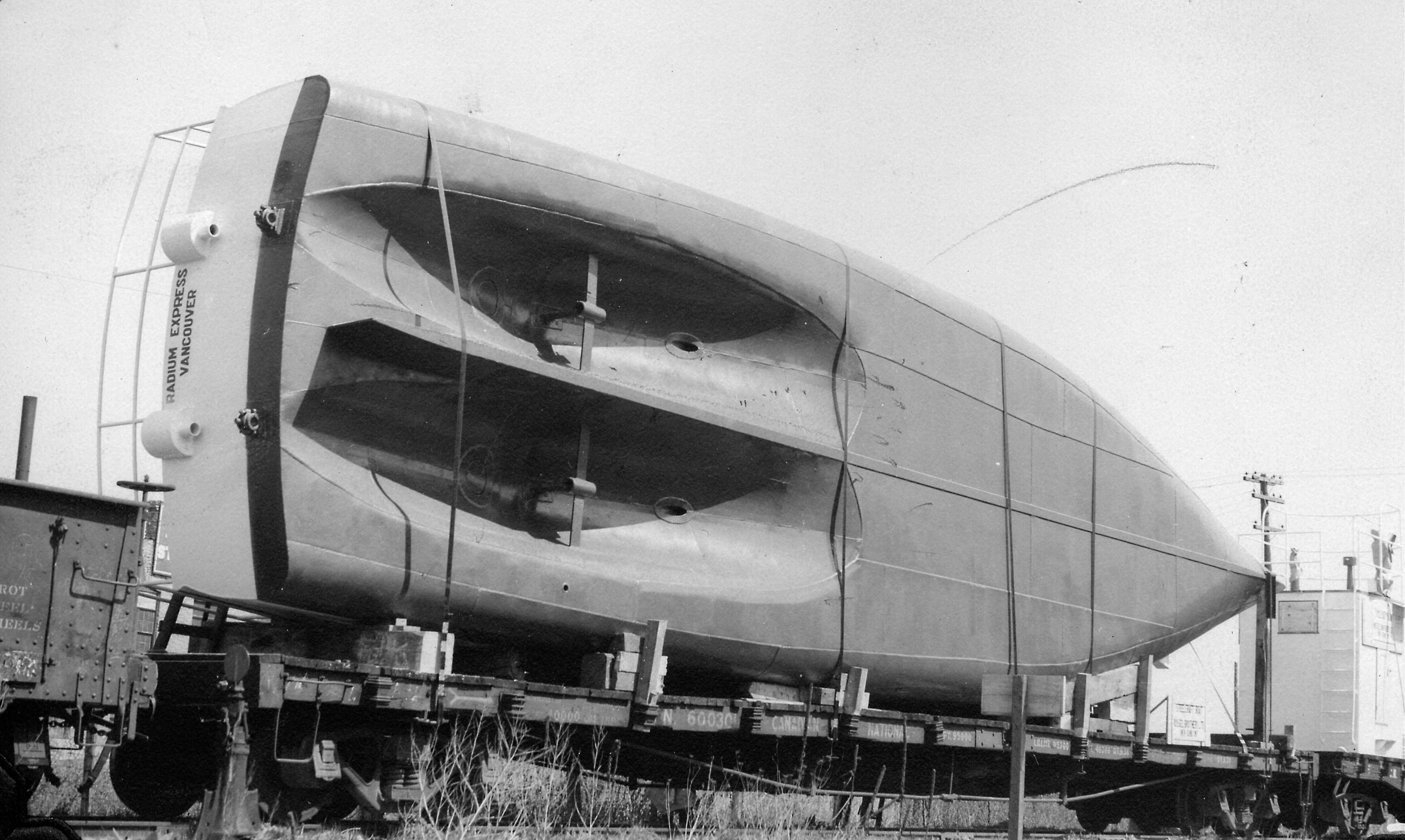
- Hull of Radium Express being shipped to Waterways, Alberta, 1939.

History

Canada
- Name: Radium Express
- Operator: Northern Transportation Company
- Builder: Russel Brothers, Owen Sound
- Laid down: 1939
- Launched: 1939
- Completed: 1939
- Commissioned: as Radium Express

General characteristics
- Tonnage: 60 tons
- Displacement: 88 tons
- Length: 21.94 m (72.0 ft)
- Beam: 6.03 m (19.8 ft)
- Draught: 2 ft (0.61 m)
- Installed power: 100 hp (75 kW) diesel engine
- Speed: 9 kn (17 km/h; 10 mph)

The Radium Express is a Russel Brothers tugboat operated by the Northern Transportation Company. The vessel was built in Owen Sound, Ontario, disassembled, and then shipped by rail to Waterways, Alberta, which was then the terminus of the North American railway grid.

Like the other vessels in the "Radium Line", she was reassembled in Waterways, on the Clearwater River, a tributary of the Mackenzie, and then proceeded down the Athabasca River and Slave River to Fort Smith, and portaged to the lower river, where she could navigate most of the remainder of the extensive Mackenzie River system.

== Operational career ==
In 1938, the Saskatoon Star-Phoenix reported the vessel was designed to travel at up to 20 knots (37 km/h; 23 mph), faster than the Radium Line's larger vessels, so it could take over tows in regions of particularly rapid current. The Canadian Transportation Agency reported her speed as 9 knots (17 km/h; 10 mph) in 2011.

On November 16, 1945, the Radium Express and the Radium King were caught by freeze up in Yellowknife.

An account, published in 1953, of her first trip up the Bear River, said her propellers were first removed from their tunnels, and the ship slowly hauled herself up the river's 27 miles (43 km) of rapids with her winch. The account said the winching was complicated because permafrost caused the trees to which she tied her winch-line had shallow roots. The account said this took 13 and a half hours.

== Specifications ==
specifications
Gross tonnage:	88 t
Net tonnage:	60 t
Length:	21.94 metres
Breadth:	6.03 metres
Depth:	1.67 metres
Draught:	0.91 metres
Self-propelled power:	474 brake horsepower
Speed:	9.0 knots [sic]

== Disposal ==
In 2005 Atomic Energy of Canada published a study of the toxic legacy of the mining of radioactive ore at Port Radium. According to the report the Radium Express and all the other surviving vessels of the Radium line were found to be free of contamination, with the exception of the Radium Gilbert. The 2005 study said the Radium Express was being stored, in Hay River.
