= MV Glenada =

Tugboat

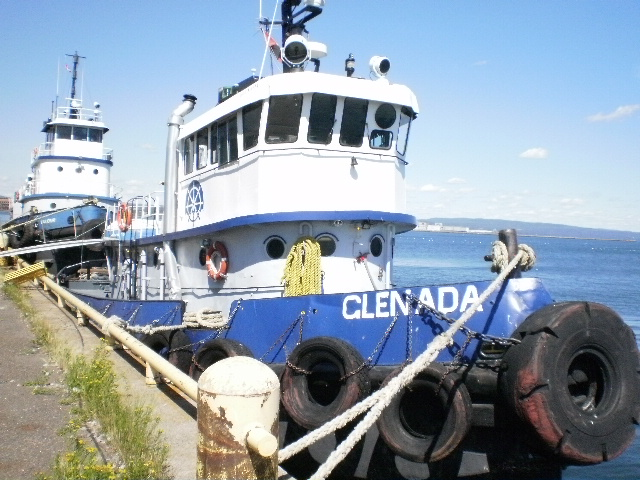
- Glenada in 2011

History

Canada
- Name: Glenada (C.N.534)
- Builder: Russel Brothers Limited, Owen Sound, Ontario
- Launched: 23 November 1943
- Decommissioned: 1956
- Identification: IMO number: 8745371; Official Number: 177886
- Fate: Sold 1956
- Name: Glenada
- Owner: Sandrin Brothers, Sarnia, Ontario (1956-1995); Thunder Bay Tug Services Ltd, Thunder Bay, Ontario (from 1995)
- Identification: IMO number: 8745371
- Status: In service

General characteristics
- Class & type: Glen-class tugboat
- Tonnage: 107 GRT
- Length: 22.4 m (73 ft 6 in)
- Beam: 7 m (23 ft 0 in)
- Draught: 2 m (6 ft 7 in)
- Installed power: 2 generators
- Propulsion: Caterpillar D399 diesel engine, 1,100 hp (820 kW)
- Speed: 11 knots (20 km/h; 13 mph)
- Complement: 3

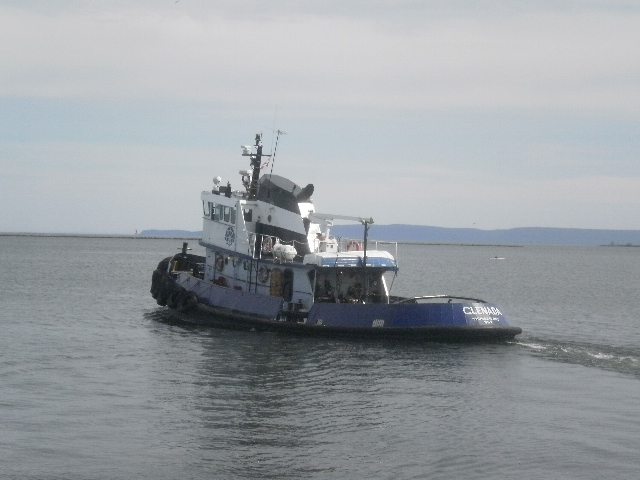
Glenada leaving dock

Glenada is an ex-Canadian navy tugboat that was launched in 1943. Glenada was built by Russel Brothers Limited in Owen Sound, Ontario. It is one of twenty 1943 Glen-class tugs, eleven of which were built by the Russel Brothers Company. When it served for the Royal Canadian Navy the official number for this boat was (W30) 177886 and the Canadian Navy number was 534. The Glen-class tugs were made in two designs (designated "A" and "B"); Glenada is an "A" design, with a longer main deck house, extending aft over the engine room, and uniform height bulwarks from forward to aft. A lifeboat is mounted on the bridgedeck aft of the stack. Glenada was originally powered by one Vivian 320 hp (240 kW) 8-cylinder diesel (400 hp (300 kW) with supercharger).

After it was decommissioned from the navy it was registered in Montreal in 1956, and used by Sandrin Bros. in Sarnia, Ontario until 1995 when it was purchased by Thunder Bay Tug Services which still owns/runs it in Lake Superior.

In 1977, Glenada was widened 2 feet (0.61 m) on each side. In 1977 the main engine suffered serious damage while assisting a ship named Hilda Marjanne in the St. Clair River. This led to the engine was being swapped out for a Caterpillar D399 V16 turbo-charged diesel engine that produces 1,100 hp (820 kW) at 1200 RPM. The tug has two generators, a Detroit Diesel 3-71 generator and a John Deere 4-cylinder diesel generator.

== Service history ==
Glenada and its crew were on hand to assist in the 1996 rescue of a cruise ship named Grampa Woo that had broken free from its dock while undergoing repairs. At the time of the incident, Grampa Woo had no propulsion capability, and was adrift. The Medal of Bravery was awarded to Captain Gerry Dawson, M.B. and Engineer John E. Olson, M.B., while deckhand James Harding, received the Star of Courage on 10 May 1999.

Glenada rescued a fishing vessel on 7 April 2007. Glenada is on display once a year at the Thunder Bay River Fest, alongside the historical James Whalen tugboat and the TBay Coast Guard boat.

== See also ==
- MV Point Valour
- MV Miseford
- MV Robert W.
