= Radium Express =

Radium Express may refer to:

- Radium Express (air charter), a single small plane that provided quick access to Port Radium in the Northwest Territories
- Radium Express (ship, 1939), a tugboat operated by the Northern Transportation Company in the Northwest Territories
