= Radium Institute =

Radium Institute can refer to:

- Curie Institute, Paris
- Curie Institute, Warsaw
- V. G. Khlopin Radium Institute, Saint Petersburg, Russia
- London Radium Institute
- Manchester and District Radium Institute
- National Radium Institute, Denver, Colorado, United States
- Sino-Belgium Radium Institute

== See also ==
- Institute for Radium Research, Vienna
- American Radium Society
- National Radium Trust, UK
- Radium (disambiguation)
