= Russel Brothers =

Defunct Boat, engine and steel manufacturer

- Predecessor: Russel-Hipwell Engines Limited
- Founded: 1907; 118 years ago in Fort Frances, Ontario, Canada
- Founders: Colin and Jardine Russel
- Defunct: 2006
- Headquarters: Owen Sound, Ontario, Canada
- Key people: Colin and Jardine Russel
- Products: Boats, diesel engines, steel

Russel Brothers Limited was a Canadian steel boat builder, diesel engine manufacturer and steel fabricator. The company operated in Fort Frances, Ontario from 1907 to 1937 and then in Owen Sound, Ontario from 1937 to 1994. The old site was later used by Fort Frances Steel & Welding and Busch’s Auto Supply before being demolished and now parking lot for LaVerendrye General Hospital along Front Street and Armit Avenue

== History ==
=== Fort Frances years 1907-1937 ===
Founded in Fort Frances, Ontario in 1907 by Colin and Jardine Russel,

=== Owen Sound years 1937-1994 ===
The company moved to Owen Sound in 1937 and remained there until 1974.

After 1950 Russel Brothers became Russel-Hipwell Engines Limited (named of unit founded in 1943). In 1961 the name Russel Brothers Limited reemerged and lasted until 1994.

The company built 1200 boats in its lifetime as Russel Brothers and Russel-Hipwell. The company built mostly tugs and logging boats, but made diesel switching locomotives as well. During World War II they made boats used in the D-Day landings.

While the company ceased manufacturing boats in 1974, the company continued metal fabrication until 1994. The company went bankrupt and property was sold for condos in 2006, but the land remains vacant for remediation.

== Products ==
- Radium Express, tugboat built for the Northern Transportation Company's "Radium Line" in 1939
- Radium Cruiser, tugboat built for the Northern Transportation Company's "Radium Line" in 1939
- R.J. Foote, tugboat built for the Canadian Dredge and Dock Company in 1939
- Workboy, tugboat built for the Canadian Dredge and Dock Company in 1939
- Toronto Fire Services William Mackenzie fire boat
- Maid of the Mist 2 and 2 (1955-1956)
- Atomic - icebreaker (1946)
- Okiko - Logging Tug, Hull number 608 (1946)
- Annie Mac / Bluefin - workboat (1934)
- Beaver's Helper - sluicer (1974)
- Ancaster - tug (1951)
- Missinaibi - tug (1952)
- Trent - tug (1948)
- Ongiara - ferry boat (1963)

== Manufacturing Locations ==
- Fort Frances, Ontario 1907-1937 - former machine shop location at Armit Ave and Front Street now residential homes across from La Verendrye General Hospital.
- Owen Sound, Ontario 1937-1994 - 2198 3rd Avenue East, at 22nd Street East (former Polson Iron Works) and now vacant (all buildings demolished) with area around dockyard surrounded by grass
- Halifax, Nova Scotia 1944 to late 1940s (for war effort)
- Port Arthur, Ontario 1948-?
- Toronto, Ontario 1956 - later as head office
- St John's, Newfoundland and Labrador 1957-?
