= Marine Transportation Services =

Former Canadian marine transportation company

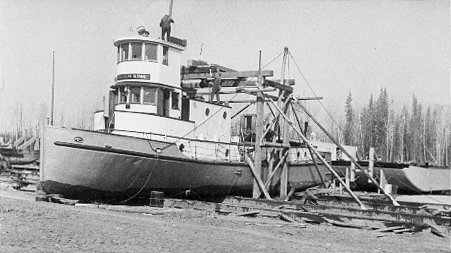
Reassembly of the Radium King, 1937.

Marine Transportation Services (MTS) formerly Northern Transportation Company Limited (NTCL) is a marine transportation company operating primarily in the Mackenzie River watershed of the Northwest Territories and northern Alberta, and the Arctic Ocean using a fleet of diesel tug boats and shallow-draft barges. NTCL filed for bankruptcy in 2016 and its assets were acquired by the Government of the Northwest Territories later that year.

== History ==
The company was an outgrowth of the competition in the Northwest Territories and Northern Alberta between the new Northern Traders Company and the entrenched Hudson's Bay Company. Colonel James Cornwall, one of the principals of the Northern Traders Company, ran his first steamer, a stern wheeler The Midnight Sun, on the Lesser Slave River in 1904. The company acted as a kind of subsidiary of the Northern Trading Company until its formal creation in 1930 as Northern Waterways Limited, but its name was changed in 1934 to the Northern Transportation Company Limited.

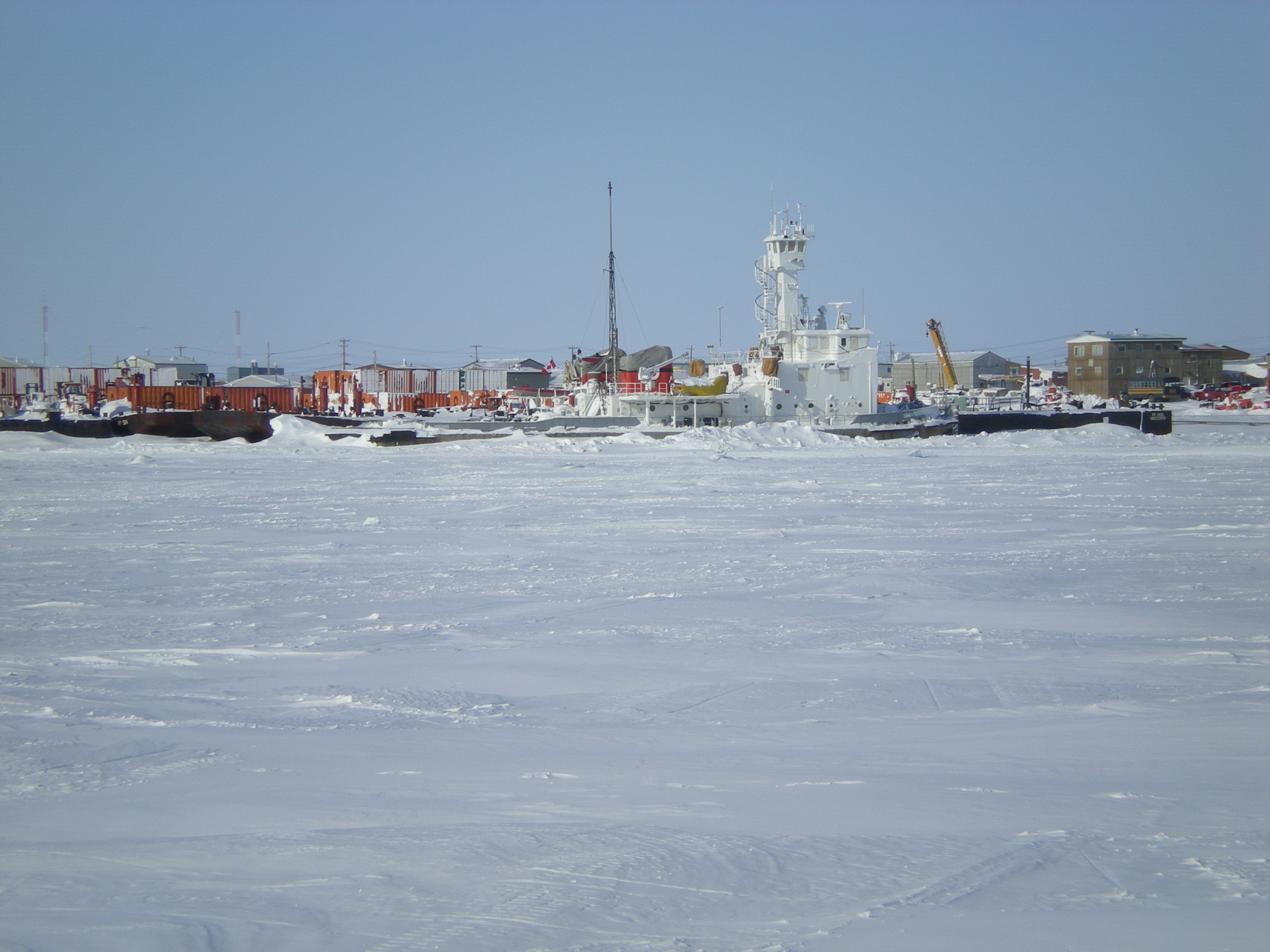
NTCL tug and barges overwintering in Cambridge Bay after the annual sealift

In the summer of 1934, the company's first season, it operated with small tugboats and power barges. From Waterways to Fort Fitzgerald on the Athabasca/Slave River, it used the motor tugboat Mabel with three barges; from Fort Smith to Aklavik on the Slave/Mackenzie Rivers, it used a 90-foot twin diesel powered barge with two barges carrying 300-tons per trip; from Fort Smith to Fort Rae (now Behchokǫ̀) on the north end of Great Slave Lake it used a power barge with 100-ton capacity. On the Bear River route into Great Bear Lake, where significant silver and uranium mineral exploration was underway in 1934, the company used a series of boats and barges. The tugboat Norman operated from Fort Norman (now Tulita) to the head of the first rapids with a 50-ton barge. Freight was then transferred around the rapid portage to the vessel Sternwheeler with 20-ton capacity, operating up the Bear River to the next set of rapids. After that portage, freight was transferred to a tugboat pushing a 50-ton barge to Fort Franklin (now Délı̨nę) on Great Bear Lake. Finally, freight was transferred onto a 90-foot power barge suitable for lake traffic pushing two 90-foot barges with carrying capacity of 350-tons, destined for Port Radium and Cameron Bay mining camps.

In 1936, NTCL was taken over by the Eldorado Gold Mines Limited and Arthur Berry was appointed manager in Edmonton. In 1944, it became a Crown corporation when its parent, then known as Eldorado Mining and Refining, was nationalized by the Government of Canada.

NTCL's water freighting activities in the early years were focused on the Athabasca/Slave/Mackenzie River systems as a means to supply the Northwest Territories and northern Alberta with freight. Mineral development, commercial sawmills, wartime strategic projects (such as the Canol pipeline in 1942), and the growth of settlements in these districts lead to a growth in demand for NTCL's services. Its flagships were the Radium Queen and Radium King both commissioned in 1937 for use on the upper and lower Slave Rivers. Other vessels in this fleet included the Radium Express, Radium Yellowknife, Radium Prince, Radium Cruiser, Radium Scout, Radium Charles, Radium Gilbert and Radium Lad, earning the fleet the name "The Radium Line". Port Radium on Great Bear Lake, a mine that supplied much of the uranium used by the Manhattan Project, and later the uranium mines on Lake Athabasca in northern Saskatchewan, were key destinations for the fleet. All of the tugs had extremely shallow draft, and mounted their propellers in cavities under their hull. Five vessels in the fleet, the George Askew, the Watson Lake, Horn River, Sandy Jane and Great Bear, did not include "Radium" in their name.

Construction of Distant Early Warning communication sites along the Arctic Ocean coastline in the 1950s provided an opportunity for the company to expand and engineer larger and more efficient tugboats and barges. In 1975, then under the jurisdiction of the Coast Guard Northern Division of Transport Canada, it became the sole marine shipper in the Canadian Arctic operating of out of Churchill, Manitoba. In 1959, it moved its operational headquarters from Fort Smith on the Slave River, to the town of Hay River. In 1965 NTCL purchased Yellowknife Transportation Company and Arctic Transportation to become sole commercial marine freighter in the Northwest Territories and Arctic Ocean.

In 1985, NTCL was purchased by the Inuvialuit Development Corporation and Nunasi Corporation, two native-owned corporations. On April 1, 2014, the Inuvialuit Development Corporation (IDC) bought the 50% share of NorTerra held by Nunasi. This purchase of NorTerra gave the IDC complete control of Canadian North, NTCL and other companies that were jointly held. NTCL filed for bankruptcy in 2016 and its assets were acquired by the Government of the Northwest Territories later that year in order to ensure that the essential fuel transportation service continued for residents of the Northwest Territories.
