= Radium Gilbert =

Canadian tugboat

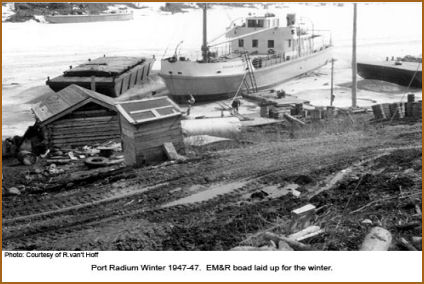
Radium Gilbert moored in Port Radium, in 1947.

The Radium Gilbert was a tugboat built for transporting supplies to, and ore from, the radium and uranium mines in Canada's Northwest Territories. Like the other tugs in the Radium Line she was steel-hulled.

She was named after Gilbert Labine, the prospector who discovered radioactive ore where Port Radium was built. She was built in Vancouver, in 1946 disassembled, so she could be shipped by rail to Waterways, Alberta. Like all vessels assembled in Waterways that operated on the Mackenzie River, and its tributaries, after she was reassembled she first proceeded downstream to Lake Athabasca, and down the Slave River, to the portage at Fort Smith. Large tractors towed even large cargo overland around large rapids there.

The Radium Gilbert spent her operational life 1946 to 1980 on Great Bear Lake.

She ran aground near Deline, the small community at the outlet for Great Bear Lake. Her wreck remained radioactive decades after she was used to ship radioactive ore.

She was dismantled, and removed, in 2003, after lying grounded, for decades. By that time the population of Deline understood the toxic legacy of the trade in radioactive ore, and the nearby wreck was a painful reminder.

In 2005 Atomic Energy of Canada published a study of the toxic legacy of the mining of radioactive ore at Port Radium. According to the report all the other surviving vessels of the Radium line were found to be free of contamination. But the Radium Gilbert was significantly contaminated—particularly her showers.
