= Fort Smith, Northwest Territories =

Fort Smith Thebacha
- Town
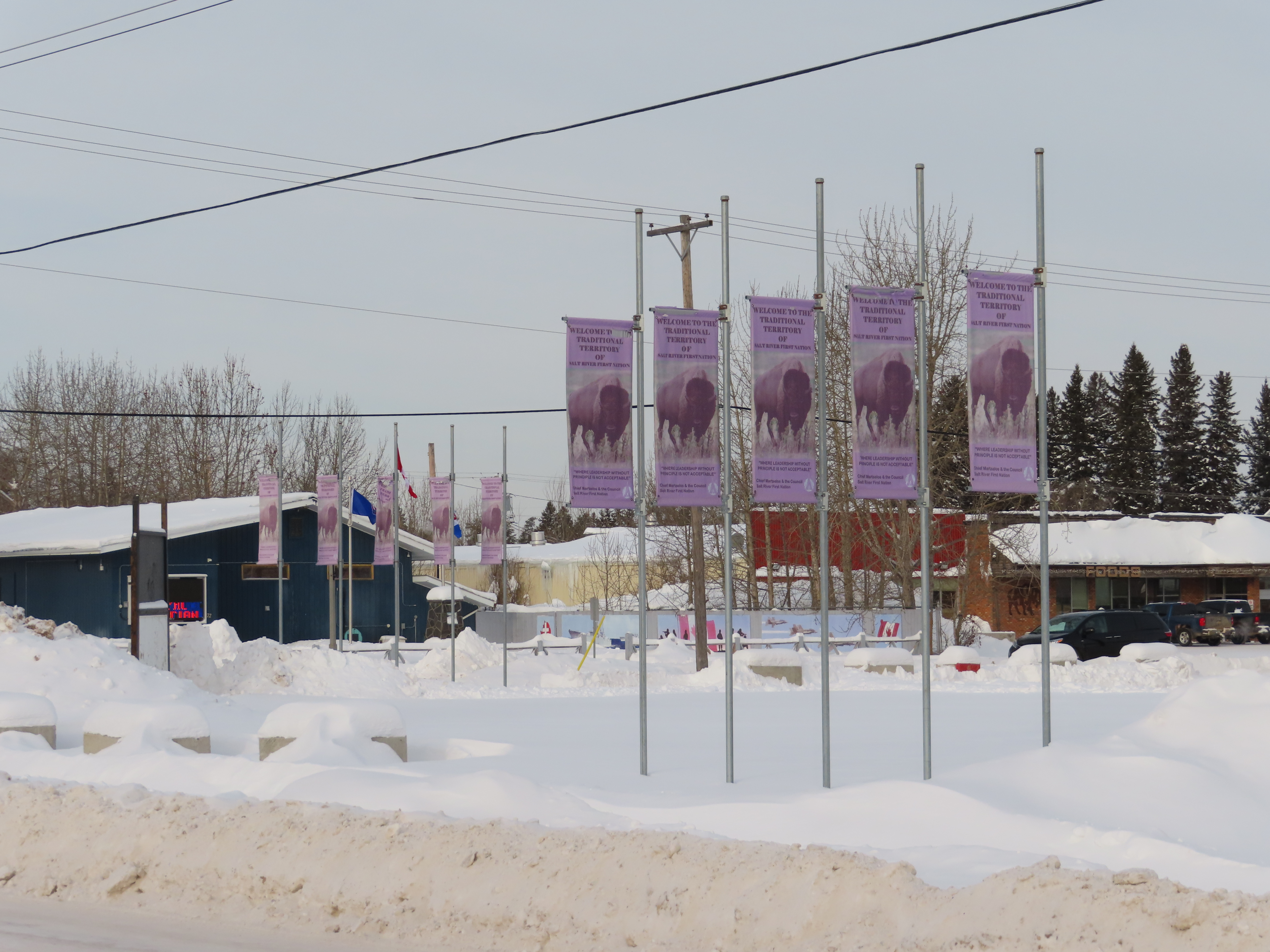
- Motto: Perseverance
- Location within Northwest Territories Location within Canada
- Coordinates: 60°00′19″N 111°52′58″W
- Country: Canada
- Territory: Northwest Territories
- Region: South Slave Region
- Electoral district: Thebacha
- Census division: Region 5
- Town: 1 October 1966

Government
  - Mayor: Dana Fergusson
  - Senior administrative officer: Tracy Thomas
  - MLA: Jay MacDonald

Area (2021)
  - Land: 91.21 km^{2} (35.22 sq mi)
  - Population Centre: 2.04 km^{2} (0.79 sq mi)
- Elevation: 205 m (673 ft)

Population (2021)
  - Total: 2,248
  - Density: 24.6/km^{2} (64/sq mi)
  - Population Centre: 1,749
  - Population Centre density: 855.8/km^{2} (2,217/sq mi)
- Time zone: UTC−06:00 (Northwest Territories Time)
- Postal code: X0E 0P0
- Area code: 867
- Telephone exchange: 872 621 870
- GNBC Code: LAILN
- Living cost (2018): 132.5^{A}
- Food price index (2019): 118.8^{B}
- Climate: Dfc
- NTS Map: 75D4 Fort Smith
- Website: Town of Fort Smith
- Sources: Department of Municipal and Community Affairs, Prince of Wales Northern Heritage Centre, Canada Flight Supplement^A2018 figure based on Edmonton = 100^B2019 figure based on Yellowknife = 100

Fort Smith (Chipewyan: Thebacha "beside the rapids") is a town in the South Slave Region of the Northwest Territories (NWT), Canada. It is located in the southeastern portion of the Northwest Territories, on the Slave River and adjacent to the Alberta border along the 60th parallel north.

== History ==
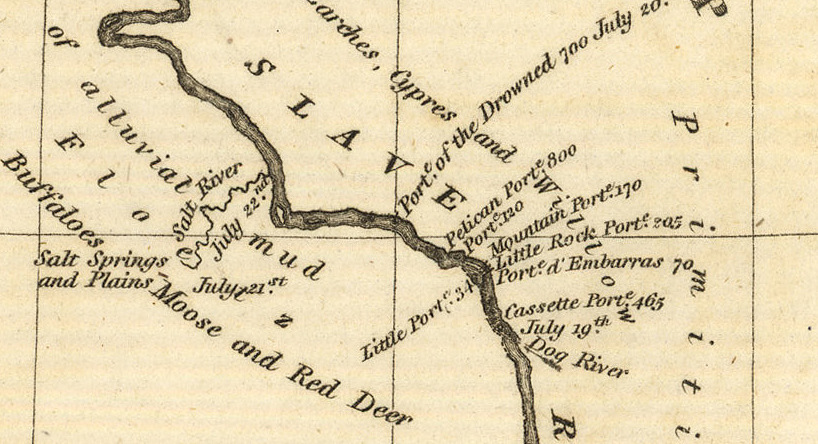
John Franklin's 1819–1820 expedition map showing Slave River, Salt River and portages

Fort Smith was founded around the Slave River. It served a vital link for water transportation between southern Canada and the western Arctic. Early fur traders found a portage route, long established by indigenous peoples, from what is now Fort Fitzgerald on the western bank of the Slave River to Fort Smith. This route allowed its users to bypass the four sets of impassable rapids (Cassette Rapids, Pelican Rapids, Mountain Rapids, and Rapids of the Drowned). The portage trail had been traditionally used for centuries by generations of local Indigenous peoples.

The make up of the Indigenous population of the region shifted as the fortunes of the tribes changed. By 1870, the Slavey had moved north and the Cree had occupied the Slave River Valley. The Chipewyan had also begun moving into the area.

Peter Pond of the North West Company was the first white trader recorded to have traveled on the Slave River and made contact with Indigenous peoples in this region. In the 1780s, he established a post on Lake Athabasca called Fort Chipewyan, at the head of the Slave River.

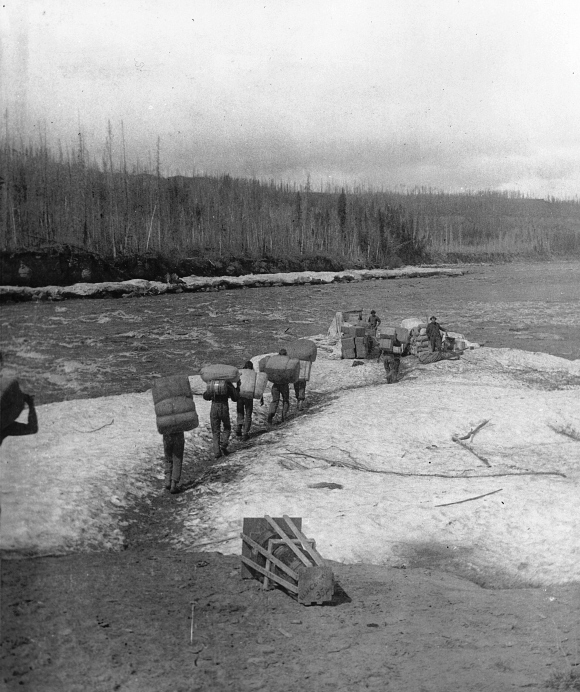
Portage on the Slave River circa 1900

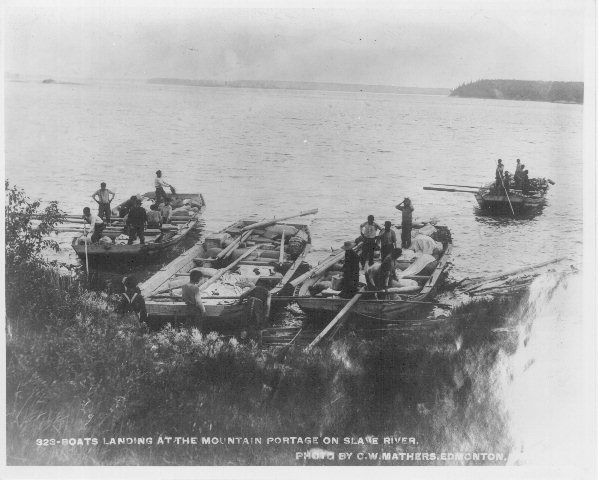
Boats landing at Mountain Portage on the Slave River circa 1900

Dominated by the activities of the Hudson's Bay Company, the fur trade penetrated more deeply into the Mackenzie River district in the 19th century. York boats were used to run the Slave River rapids; where needed, small portages were also established to bypass the most dangerous areas. Nonetheless, serious mishaps were bound to happen. This section of the Slave River became known as 'The Rapids of the Drowned'.

In 1872, the Hudson's Bay Company built an outpost called Smith's Landing (Fort Fitzgerald) at the most southern set of the Slave River rapids. In 1874, another outpost was constructed at the most northern set of rapids. It was called Fort Smith. Both posts were named in honour of Donald Alexander Smith, who in August 1897, was elevated to the Peerage of the United Kingdom as The 1st Baron Strathcona and Mount Royal.

In 1876, the Roman Catholic Mission was moved from Salt River to Fort Smith while the community was prospering.

In 1886, the Hudson's Bay Company launched the steam-propelled vessel SS Wrigley to run from Fort Smith to the Mackenzie River. The steamer SS Grahame ran the Slave River from Fort McMurray to the head of the rapids at Smith's Landing beginning in 1882. In 1898, the Yukon Gold Rush brought many gold seekers over the portages and through Fort Smith. In 1908, a new HBC steamer paddlewheeler, SS Mackenzie River, was launched to operate on the Slave and Mackenzie rivers below Fort Smith (see boats of the Mackenzie River watershed).

In 1911, government was established in Fort Smith when Ottawa sent an Indian agent and a regional medical doctor, and the Royal Northwest Mounted Police opened a detachment. With these developments, Fort Smith became not only the transportation centre for the western Arctic but the administrative centre as well.

The mission sawmill produced lumber for the first hospital, St. Anne's, built in 1914 for the Grey Nuns. The sawmill also supplied the lumber for the first school, built in 1915. The Roman Catholic Mission also operated St. Bruno's Farm, which supplied produce, meat, and dairy products. Until it was closed in the 1920s, the farm supplied all the church's missions in the western Arctic. Its workers maintained a herd of more than 140 cattle.

Horse-drawn freight services were complemented by tractors in 1919, when the Alberta & Arctic Transportation Company, a subsidiary of Lamson & Hubbard Trading Company, commissioned two 75-horsepower (56 kW) tractors on the Slave River portage to haul commercial freight from one side of the rapids to the other.

With the discovery of oil at Norman Wells in 1920, a federal government administration building was constructed to house the new Northwest Territories branch and the first court of justice in the Mackenzie District. The Union Bank of Canada, making use of a tent, opened the first bank in the Northwest Territories in Fort Smith in June 1921.

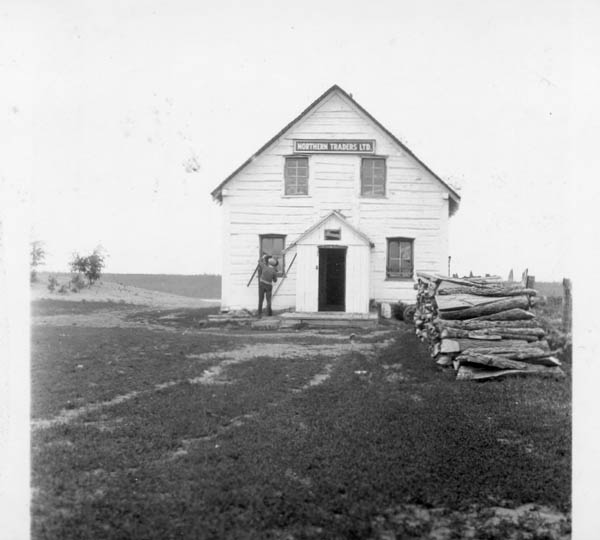
Northern Trading Co. at Fort Smith

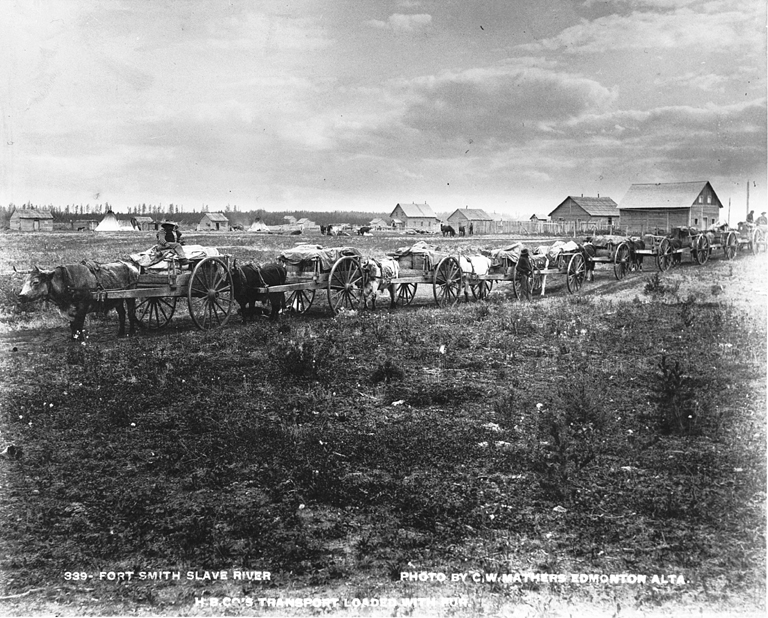
HBC transport loaded with fur, Fort Smith circa 1900

In 1920, the Lamson & Hubbard Trading Company launched Distributor to service its trading posts along the Mackenzie River. This group was taken over by the HBC in 1924. By the 1930s, a significant part of the Fort Smith economy was centred around ship and barge building. The HBC and Northern Transportation Company Limited (NTCL) established shipyards below Fort Smith.

Wood Buffalo National Park was established in 1922; its operations and administration headquarters were in Fort Smith.

In 1924, Fort Smith received the first of the Northwest Territories and Yukon Radio System installed by the Royal Canadian Corps of Signals. In 1928, Fort Smith Airport was built.

The discovery of gold in Yellowknife in 1938 was a catalyst for an economic boost to Fort Smith, as many prospectors came passing through and bought supplies at the post. In the same year, an Anglican Mission house was built; a church was built in 1939.

In 1942–1943, Fort Smith played a small part in the war effort when huge armies raged across the globe in the Second World War. With a population of 250, Fort Smith hosted 2,000 United States Army soldiers who were en route to the Canol Oil Pipeline Project at Norman Wells and the Canol Road. They brought hundreds of barge loads of supplies; and in order to move these, they built a tractor road from Fort Smith to Hay River and even farther north.

The continued gold fever that fuelled Yellowknife's growth also stimulated the five-fold growth of Fort Smith's population in the decade following 1945. Government administrative facilities were increased to keep up with population needs and the village developed as a transportation hub for the Mackenzie District.

Fort Smith was incorporated as a village in 1964; two years later, with a population of 2,130, the village became a town on October 1, 1966. The all-weather road to Hay River was officially completed in 1966, permanently linking Fort Smith to the south.

The completion of a southern rail link to Hay River in 1964 meant that Fort Smith's role as the transportation hub was largely negated. Shipping operations on the Slave River ceased in 1968.

When Yellowknife was designated as the territorial capital in 1967, Fort Smith was kept as the administrative centre of the government of the Northwest Territories' vast region. See history of Northwest Territories capital cities.

On Friday August 9, 1968, disaster struck Fort Smith when a landslide some 1,010 by 300 m (3,300 by 990 ft) broke away from the riverbank; it caused property damage and killed one person. The riverbank area has since been sloped to stabilize it. Reshaped as a gentle hillside, it is known as Riverbank Park, and features groomed trails, picnic areas, and a viewing platform to oversee the Rapids of the Drowned.

In 1970, the Adult Vocational Training Centre was opened. Its operations were later expanded and in 1981 it became Thebacha College. A few years later, Arctic College was created by the government of the Northwest Territories. The Thebacha Campus was home to government headquarters offices. In 1995, the college changed its name to Aurora College in order to allow Nunavut the use of the Arctic College name for their tribal college.

Today, Fort Smith's economy is based on the federal, territorial, and aboriginal governments, along with education and tourism. In 2008, interest began to develop to re-establish a portage route to supply the Fort McMurray oilsands operations by river.

== Geography ==
The town is approximately 300 km (190 mi) southeast of Yellowknife, the territorial capital. The park headquarters for Wood Buffalo National Park is located in Fort Smith. The headquarters and Thebacha Campus of Aurora College is located in Fort Smith; it is the largest of the three campus locations in the Northwest Territories. Fort Smith is located in the South Slave Region (administrative) and Region 5, Northwest Territories (census division). The town was previously in the Fort Smith Region census division.

Fort Smith is accessible all year long via the Fort Smith Highway. A winter road operates for several months to connect Fort Smith to Fort Chipewyan and from there to Fort McMurray. An all-weather road named Pine Lake Road links Fitzgerald.

=== Climate ===
Fort Smith has a dry continental subarctic climate (Koppen: Dfc) with very long winters combined with warm but relatively short summers.

The highest temperature ever recorded in Fort Smith was 39.9 °C (103.8 °F) on June 30, 2021, breaking the previous record of 39.4 °C (102.9 °F) on July 18, 1941. The coldest temperature ever recorded was −57.2 °C (−71.0 °F) on December 26, 1917. These are both the hottest and coldest temperatures ever recorded in the Northwest Territories.

Climate data for Fort Smith (Fort Smith Airport) WMO ID: 71934; coordinates 60°01′13″N 111°57′43″W; elevation: 205.1 m (673 ft); 1991−2020 normals, extremes 1913−present (Note: Climate data was recorded at Fort Smith from July 1913 to May 1946 and at Fort Smith Airport from September 1943 to present.)
Month	Jan	Feb	Mar	Apr	May	Jun	Jul	Aug	Sep	Oct	Nov	Dec	Year
Record high humidex	8.4	11.6	16.1	29.6	32.7	38.9	41.7	38.5	31.9	25.9	12.2	8.9	41.7
Record high °C (°F)	8.7 (47.7)	9.9 (49.8)	16.7 (62.1)	24.0 (75.2)	31.0 (87.8)	39.9 (103.8)	39.4 (102.9)	33.9 (93.0)	29.4 (84.9)	24.6 (76.3)	12.0 (53.6)	9.4 (48.9)	39.9 (103.8)
Mean daily maximum °C (°F)	−17.4 (0.7)	−13.2 (8.2)	−5.1 (22.8)	5.6 (42.1)	14.8 (58.6)	21.6 (70.9)	23.6 (74.5)	21.2 (70.2)	14.2 (57.6)	4.3 (39.7)	−7.0 (19.4)	−14.5 (5.9)	4.0 (39.2)
Daily mean °C (°F)	−21.9 (−7.4)	−18.8 (−1.8)	−11.9 (10.6)	−0.7 (30.7)	8.2 (46.8)	15.0 (59.0)	17.4 (63.3)	15.1 (59.2)	8.9 (48.0)	0.5 (32.9)	−10.6 (12.9)	−18.6 (−1.5)	−1.4 (29.5)
Mean daily minimum °C (°F)	−26.2 (−15.2)	−24.3 (−11.7)	−18.6 (−1.5)	−7.1 (19.2)	1.6 (34.9)	8.4 (47.1)	11.1 (52.0)	9.0 (48.2)	3.5 (38.3)	−3.3 (26.1)	−14.1 (6.6)	−22.6 (−8.7)	−6.9 (19.6)
Record low °C (°F)	−49.4 (−56.9)	−53.9 (−65.0)	−44.4 (−47.9)	−40.6 (−41.1)	−23.0 (−9.4)	−6.1 (21.0)	−3.3 (26.1)	−5.6 (21.9)	−12.8 (9.0)	−27.9 (−18.2)	−40.6 (−41.1)	−57.2 (−71.0)	−57.2 (−71.0)
Record low wind chill	−60.4	−58.4	−55.7	−50.4	−26.2	−8.0	0.0	−4.7	−17.8	−35.3	−48.8	−59.6	−60.4
Average precipitation mm (inches)	17.6 (0.69)	12.7 (0.50)	14.6 (0.57)	13.7 (0.54)	27.2 (1.07)	47.0 (1.85)	58.5 (2.30)	57.4 (2.26)	42.9 (1.69)	30.1 (1.19)	21.9 (0.86)	16.5 (0.65)	360.1 (14.18)
Average rainfall mm (inches)	0.1 (0.00)	0.1 (0.00)	0.4 (0.02)	6.6 (0.26)	22.0 (0.87)	48.2 (1.90)	60.2 (2.37)	61.8 (2.43)	45.2 (1.78)	15.7 (0.62)	1.1 (0.04)	0.4 (0.02)	261.7 (10.30)
Average snowfall cm (inches)	24.5 (9.6)	17.2 (6.8)	17.0 (6.7)	7.5 (3.0)	5.6 (2.2)	0.0 (0.0)	0.0 (0.0)	0.0 (0.0)	0.8 (0.3)	18.9 (7.4)	29.0 (11.4)	21.9 (8.6)	142.2 (56.0)
Average precipitation days (≥ 0.2 mm)	13.3	10.4	10.0	7.5	9.2	10.7	12.2	13.5	12.6	14.6	13.7	13.0	140.8
Average rainy days (≥ 0.2 mm)	0.15	0.12	0.54	2.7	6.6	10.0	12.2	13.2	12	8.2	1.4	0.46	67.6
Average snowy days (≥ 0.2 cm)	12.9	10.2	8.6	3.6	1.9	0.0	0.0	0.0	0.64	8.0	14.8	14.0	74.6
Average relative humidity (%) (at 1500 LST)	78.6	74.7	62.2	47.7	40.1	43.0	48.3	52.6	56.8	71.1	83.1	81.9	61.7
Mean monthly sunshine hours	57.1	113.7	176.7	243	285.9	299.1	301	261.7	132	87.3	43.5	28.3	2,029.3
Source: Environment and Climate Change Canada (June maximum) (December minimum) (sun 1951–1980)

== Demographics ==
Federal census population history of Fort Smith
Year	Pop.	±%
1941	531	—
1951	442	−16.8%
1956	1,164	+163.3%
1961	1,681	+44.4%
1966	2,120	+26.1%
1971	2,364	+11.5%
1976	2,288	−3.2%
1981	2,298	+0.4%
1986	2,460	+7.0%
1991	2,480	+0.8%
1996	2,441	−1.6%
2001	2,185	−10.5%
2006	2,364	+8.2%
2011	2,496	+5.6%
2016	2,542	+1.8%
2021	2,248	−11.6%
Source: Statistics Canada

In the 2021 Canadian census conducted by Statistics Canada, Fort Smith had a population of 2,248 living in 881 of its 1,009 total private dwellings, a change of −11.6% from its 2016 population of 2,542. With a land area of 91.21 km^{2} (35.22 sq mi), it had a population density of 24.6/km^{2} (63.8/sq mi) in 2021.

Annual population estimates

Year	Pop.	±%
1996	2,560	—
1997	2,548	−0.5%
1998	2,428	−4.7%
1999	2,452	+1.0%
2000	2,430	−0.9%
2001	2,328	−4.2%
2002	2,369	+1.8%
2003	2,438	+2.9%
2004	2,487	+2.0%
2005	2,444	−1.7%
2006	2,461	+0.7%
2007	2,506	+1.8%

Year	Pop.	±%
2008	2,463	−1.7%
2009	2,498	+1.4%
2010	2,473	−1.0%
2011	2,575	+4.1%
2012	2,573	−0.1%
2013	2,580	+0.3%
2014	2,555	−1.0%
2015	2,516	−1.5%
2016	2,581	+2.6%
2017	2,562	−0.7%
2018	2,690	+5.0%
2019	2,639	−1.9%

Sources: NWT Bureau of Statistics (2008 - 2019), NWT Bureau of Statistics (2001 - 2017)

=== Ethnicity ===
According to the 2016 census, the majority of people in Fort Smith (1,395) were Indigenous of which 740 were First Nations, 510 were Métis, 110 Inuit, and another 30 people gave multiple Indigenous responses.

Panethnic groups in the Town of Fort Smith (2001−2021)
Panethnic group	2021		2016		2011		2006		2001	
Panethnic group	Pop.	%	Pop.	%	Pop.	%	Pop.	%	Pop.	%
Indigenous	1,395	63.12%	1,650	66%	1,325	65.76%	1,460	63.2%	1,300	60.19%
European (Note: Statistic includes all persons that did not make up part of a visible minority or an indigenous identity.)	710	32.13%	785	31.4%	645	32.01%	780	33.77%	810	37.5%
South Asian	30	1.36%	10	0.4%	10	0.5%	15	0.65%	10	0.46%
Southeast Asian (Note: Statistic includes total responses of "Filipino" and "Southeast Asian" under visible minority section on census.)	25	1.13%	20	0.8%	20	0.99%	10	0.43%	10	0.46%
African	25	1.13%	20	0.8%	10	0.5%	10	0.43%	10	0.46%
East Asian (Note: Statistic includes total responses of "Chinese", "Korean", and "Japanese" under visible minority section on census.)	20	0.9%	10	0.4%	10	0.5%	20	0.87%	35	1.62%
Middle Eastern (Note: Statistic includes total responses of "West Asian" and "Arab" under visible minority section on census.)	0	0%	10	0.4%	0	0%	20	0.87%	10	0.46%
Latin American	0	0%	10	0.4%	0	0%	0	0%	0	0%
Other / multiracial (Note: Statistic includes total responses of "Visible minority, n.i.e." and "Multiple visible minorities" under visible minority section on census.)	0	0%	0	0%	0	0%	0	0%	0	0%
Total responses	2,210	98.31%	2,500	98.35%	2,015	80.73%	2,310	97.72%	2,160	98.86%
Total population	2,248	100%	2,542	100%	2,496	100%	2,364	100%	2,185	100%
Note: Totals greater than 100% due to multiple origin responses

=== Language ===
The main languages are English, Chipewyan (Dene), Cree, Dogrib (Tłı̨chǫ), Slavey-Hare, Inuinnaqtun (Inuvialuktun) and Inuktitut.

- Mother tongue (2021):
  - Official languages
    - English as first language: 1,945 (88.0%)
    - French as first language: 65 (2.95)
    - English and French as first language: 15 (0.7%)
    - English and non-official language(s): 45 (2.0%)
  - Indigenous Canadian languages
    - Dene : 60 (1.4%)
    - Cree : 25 (1.1%)
    - Inuktut (Inuit) languages: 10 (0.5%)
    - Nehiyawewin (Plains Cree) : 10 (0.5%)
    - Inuktitut| : 5 (0.2%)
    - Deh Gah Ghotie Zhatie (South Slavey) : 5 (0.2%)
    - Satuotine Yati (North Slavey) : 5 (0.2%)
  - Other languages of Canada
    - Balto-Slavic : 10 (0.5%)
    - Slavic: 10 (0.5%)
    - Chinese : 5 (0.2%)
    - Dravidian : 5 (0.2%)
    - German : 5 (0.2%)
    - Indo-Aryan : 5 (0.2%)
    - Italian : 5 (0.2%)
    - Multiple non-official languages : 5 (0.2%)
    - Tagalog (Pilipino, Filipino) : 5 (0.2%)

== Government ==
Fort Smith federal election results
Year	Liberal		Conservative		New Democratic		Green	
2021	31%	183	11%	68	43%	258	4%	24
2019	36%	264	19%	139	40%	293	5%	37

Local government consists of the Town of Fort Smith Council with 9 members (7 councillors, deputy mayor and mayor). The mayor works part-time and council is elected every three years. As of 2021 the current mayor of Fort Smith is Fred Daniels.

Fort Smith is represented by the Salt River First Nation #195 and are part of the Akaitcho Territory Government. As of June 2012, the Salt River First Nation had given the Akaitcho Territory Government the mandatory six months notice that they would be separating from the organization.

The Fort Smith Métis Council is the local representation for members of the Northwest Territory Métis Nation. In 1996, a framework agreement was signed with the government of the Northwest Territories and the government of Canada to commence negotiations on land, resources and self-government.

== Attractions ==
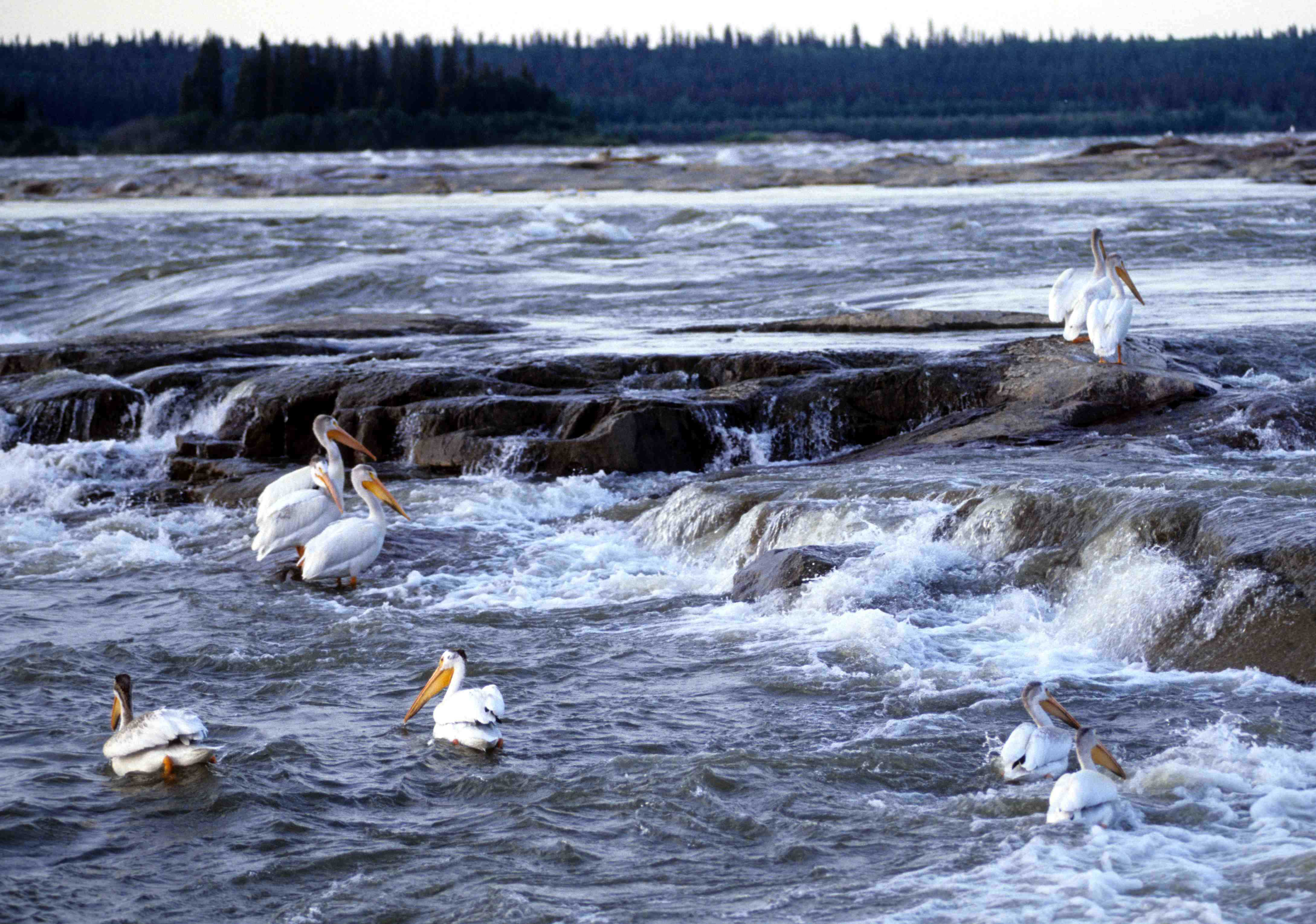
Pelicans on the Rapids of the Drowned

Fort Smith is the home of the Northern Life Museum and the museum ship Radium King. Wood Buffalo National Park can also be accessed from Fort Smith.

Every year the South Slave Friendship Festival, a music and arts festival, occurs in Fort Smith, usually in August. Musicians and artists from across the Northwest Territories and many other faraway places come to interact with other artists and show off their talents to the public.

Many tourists come to see Slave River, where many kayakers also attempt to kayak the rapids of Slave River.

Fort Smith Mission Park is a popular tourist attraction featuring historic buildings and a grotto from the Oblate Catholic Mission.

In the summer months, pelicans can be seen nesting on the various rapids near Fort Smith. Whooping cranes, an endangered species, also nest in the area during the summer and can be viewed via air charters as ground access is prohibited.

== Education ==
There are a number of educational facilities in Fort Smith including Joseph Burr Tyrrell Elementary School, Paul William Kaeser High School and the Thebacha Campus of Aurora College. Additionally, the main office of the South Slave Divisional Education Council is located in the town.

== Notable people ==
- Mark Carney, 24th Prime Minister of Canada, former governor of the Bank of Canada and the Bank of England.

== See also ==
- List of municipalities in the Northwest Territories
- Fort Smith (District) Heliport
