= Waterways, Alberta =

Coordinates: 56.700°N 111.340°W

Location of Waterways, Alberta

Waterways is a locality within the Regional Municipality of Wood Buffalo in northern Alberta, Canada. It is now a neighbourhood within the Fort McMurray urban service area along the west bank of the Clearwater River, south of the river's confluence with the Athabasca River.

== History ==
In 1921, Waterways became a major shipping hub when the Alberta and Great Waterways Railway reached the town, making it the northernmost point on the North American railroad grid. Cargo for destinations farther north was shipped to Waterways and then transferred to barges, after which fleets of tugboats took them to destinations in the Mackenzie River watershed.

In 1930, Karl Clark shipped a plant designed to separate bitumen from the Athabasca oil sands to Waterways and set it up nearby across the Clearwater River. Since that time, the rail line to Waterways has played an important role in transporting heavy equipment and supplies needed for the development of the oil sands and the accompanying growth of the surrounding communities.

In 1933, Waterways gave its name to the Waterways Formation, a sequence of limestones and calcareous shales that outcrops along the Clearwater and Athabasca Rivers near the town.

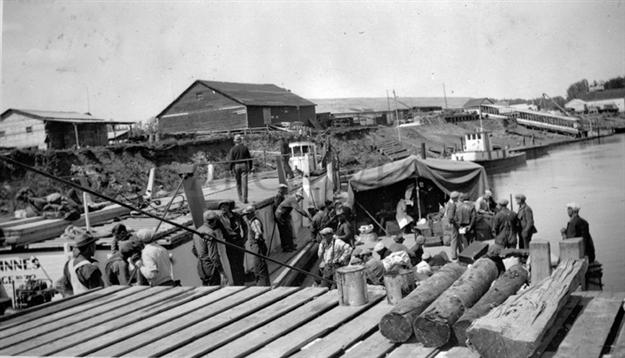
Waterways in 1939

In 1937, a salt plant was built at Waterways to recover rock salt from the subsurface by solution mining and evaporation. The salt was part of the Prairie Evaporite Formation, which was about 61 metres (200 ft) thick and lay at a depth of about 210 metres (700 ft) at that location. The plant operated until 1950, producing 207,000 tonnes (228,000 short tons) of salt.

Waterways was an important, transfer point for pitchblende ore during the Second World War. The ore was mined at Eldorado Mine, then shipped by barges to Waterways, where it was transferred to rail cars for shipping onwards to Port Hope, Ontario. The whole operation was all a top-secret uranium source for the Manhattan Project. An unwanted legacy was nuclear contamination of soils around Waterways, which were much later cleaned up.

In 1964, shipping from Waterways to the Mackenzie River region ceased after Hay River, on Great Slave Lake in the Northwest Territories, became the northern terminus of the rail grid. Local shipping from Waterways continued, however, and the rail line to Waterways eventually became part of the Northern Alberta Railway, the Canadian National Railway, and then the Athabasca Northern Railway, and finally back to the CNR.

During the 2016 Fort McMurray Wildfire, Waterways was critically damaged. According to fire damage reports on May 4, 90% of homes in Waterways had already been lost to the wildfire.

== Demographics ==
The population of the Waterways neighbourhood in the Regional Municipality of Wood Buffalo's 2006 municipal census was 750.

== See also ==
- List of communities in Alberta
