= Canol shale play =

The Canol shale play is the name for a region of Canada's Northwest Territories that is being investigated as a potential source of tight oil (also referred to as shale oil). The region centers around the known reserves of conventionally exploitable petroleum at Norman Wells.

Oil industry commentators see the region as a potentially rich source of future revenue. Local native groups are concerned over the regions remoteness and extreme environmental sensitivity, and to the lack of any testing standards to scientifically measure whether the use of toxic chemicals in hydraulic fracking is causing irredeemable damage to groundwater overlaying the regions of fractured rock. The Northern Journal quoted some of the objections of Sahtu elder Madeline Karkagie:

"Who would give our land and water for money? The oil companies will only be here until they ruin the land, then they will go. That's like our back yard. We hunted there and trapped. They built a landing strip in an area where moose calved."

The first test fracturing was conducted in the region in 2012, without any prior environmental assessments being performed. On October 6, 2013, The Globe and Mail reported that Henry Sykes, the CEO of MGM Energy, complained that environmental concerns were causing financially troubling delays. Canada's National Energy Board gave ConocoPhillips permission to build fracking wells in the region on October 30, 2013. On January 17, 2014, The Globe and Mail reported drilling would begin in February.

The Canol pipeline (short for "Canadian Oil") was a small diameter pipeline completed by the US Army in 1944 to help supply conventional crude oil from Norman Wells to Alaska. It was built as a short-term project during World War II, and was operated barely more than a year.
