= Haines-Fairbanks Pipeline =

The Haines-Fairbanks Pipeline, also called the ALCANGO Pipeline (for Alaska-Canada Gas Oil) , was a 626-mile (1,007 km) 8-inch (20 cm) military pipeline transporting petroleum products such as Jet fuel, mogas, diesel, and avgas from Haines, Alaska through the Yukon Territory, Canada and on into Fairbanks, Alaska terminating at Fort Wainwright.

== History ==
The first attempt to build a fuel pipeline to Alaska was the WWII-era Canol Project, a system of pipelines and related infrastructure hurriedly constructed for the U.S. Army at great expense. The Army, fearful of Japanese attacks on Alaska, sought an alternative fuel supply, and chose the oil fields at Norman Wells. The project consisted of a pipeline from Norman Wells to Whitehorse (Canol No. 1) a refinery in Whitehorse, and pipelines to Skagway (Canol No. 2), Watson Lake (Canol No. 3), and Fairbanks (Canol No. 4). With the conclusion of the war, the high cost of operation of Canol project could no longer be justified, and Canol No. 1 and No. 3 were shut down, while the Whitehorse refinery was dismantled. Canol No. 2 and No. 4 remained in use to ship fuel from Skagway, where it arrived by tanker, to military installations around Fairbanks.

By the early 1950s the remaining sections of the Canol pipelines, which was as small as 3 inches (7.6 cm) in diameter, were no longer adequate to deliver sufficient amounts of JP-4 jet fuel required for Strategic Air Command B-47 and B-52 bombers operating out of Eielson Air Force Base. The U.S. Army Corps of Engineers commissioned the Fluor Corporation to design a replacement 8-inch (20 cm) pipeline, and the construction was complete by October 1955. The cost, including a dock in Haines, was US$43,749,796 (equivalent to $525,812,766 in 2025).

== Closure ==
On 23 May 1968 the pipeline spilled approximately 4,000 US barrels (480,000 L) of diesel or jet fuel into Dezadeash Lake Subsequent inspections revealed the cause to be corroded pipe and identified several other major sections of corroded pipe. The Army assessed the cost of repairing the entire pipeline at US$96 million (equivalent to $8,428,312,160 in 2025) and evaluated alternatives such as constructing new pipelines from Whittier or Valdez. However given the forthcoming opening of a commercial refinery in Fairbanks and the a shift in nuclear strategy that emphasized Intercontinental ballistic missiles such as the LGM-30 Minuteman (which used solid fuel) over long-range bombers diminished the case for the pipeline.

The Haines-Tok section of the pipeline was decommissioned in 1971, and declared permanently closed in 1972. The Tok-Eielson section followed in 1973, although it was briefly repaired and re-opened to drain the Tok Tank Farm when the Army decided to close it in 1979. The pipeline was declared surplus to military use and listed for sale by the General Services Administration. While there was some interest from the private sector, the pipeline was never sold, and a Canadian government report deemed civilian use unfeasible.

In 1996, the United States Government entered into an agreement with the Government of Canada on the environmental remediation of the pipeline in Canada, alongside the remediation of the DEW Line, Naval Station Argentia in Newfoundland, and U.S. installations at CFB Goose Bay in Labrador. While asserting it had no legal obligation to reimburse Canada for the costs of remediation, the U.S. agreed to deposit US$100 million (equivalent to $211,290,675 in 2025) into Canada's Foreign Military Sales Trust Account as compensation for the costs of cleanup of the four sites.

The Fairbanks-Eielson section remains in use, other sections have been repurposed as conduit for communications or electrical cables.
