= Canol Project =

Former pipeline in Canada and Alaska

The Canol Project was an oil pipeline project constructed during World War II to ensure a supply of oil for the defense of Alaska and the North American west coast. The project included a section of crude petroleum transport by barge, a refinery, and a 4-inch pipeline. It was completed in two years at great cost and was abandoned less than a year later.

== History ==
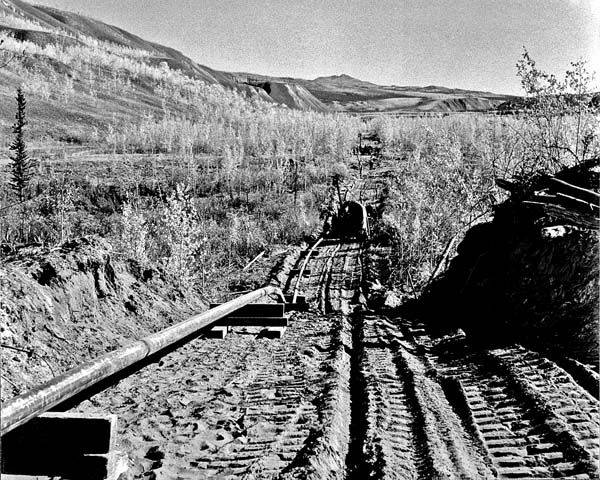
Pipeline construction near Ross River

The entry of the United States in World War II highlighted the strategic role and vulnerability of Alaska. Military operations in Alaska depended on fuel transported by sea from the U.S. West Coast, and the U.S. Army became increasingly concerned about the vulnerability of that supply line to Japanese attacks, particularly after the Japanese invasion of the Aleutian Islands and the attack on the Ellwood Oil Field in Southern California.

The construction of infrastructure to Alaska from Norman Wells was first raised by the arctic explorer Vilhjalmur Stefansson, who proposed a water connection from the railhead at Waterways, Alberta to Norman Wells, and then a road to Fairbanks via Dawson City as an alternative to the Alaska Highway. Claims for oil in the Norman Wells area were first staked in 1914 by the geologist T.O. Bosworth, and they were subsequently acquired by Imperial Oil, which drilled three producing wells and built a small refinery by 1924. Local demand was so small that refinery soon closed, but it re-opened in the early 1930s to supply the Eldorado Mine at Port Radium.

The order to construct a pipeline from Norman Wells to Whitehorse was issued by Brigadier General Brehon B. Somervell, head of the Construction Division of the Quartermaster Corps, based on the recommendation of Colonel James Graham, the Dean of Engineering at the University of Kentucky. Graham based his recommendation on a one-day conference he organized, attended mostly by Army officials, where no one present was familiar with the area the pipeline was to be built. Somervill's directive set the completion date for the project as 1 October 1942, a mere six months after the order was issued, although Somervill later told a U.S. Senate Committee reviewing the project that at the time he thought the project might actually be completed by the summer of 1943. The US War Department decided to construct the project in April 1942 and it was assigned to the United States Army Corps of Engineers.

== Construction ==
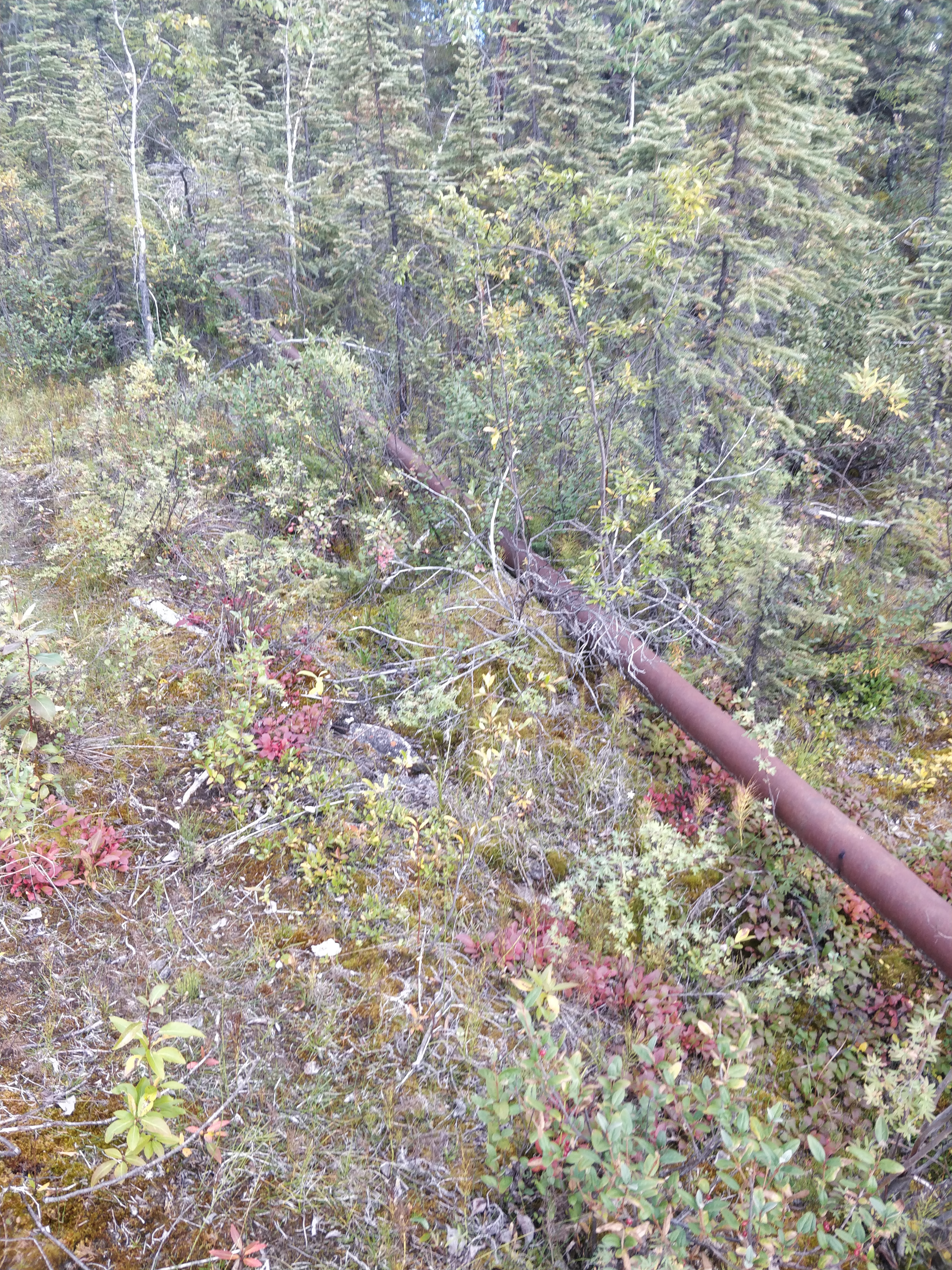
Remains of the Canol Pipeline along the Canol Heritage Trail, 2020

W.A. Bechtel Co, H. Price & Co. and W. E. Callahan Construction Co. formed a consortium to construct the project. Known as Bechtel-Price-Callahan (BPC) it also included six associated companies. Standard Oil Company was a consultant on the project and would operate the refinery in Whitehorse. Imperial Oil owned the Norman Wells field and would be responsible for the supply of oil. J. Gordon Turnbull and Sverdrup and Parcel were chosen to the project's architect and engineer of record.

The eventual scope of the project included:

- An 1,100-mile-long (1,800 km) barge supply route from Waterways, Alberta to Norman Wells
- A series of ten airfields stretching from Edmonton to Norman Wells
- An 1,000-mile-long (1,600 km) winter road from Peace River, Alberta to Norman Wells
- A water and rail-based supply route via Prince Rupert and Skagway, Alaska
- An all-weather road between Norman Wells and Johnson's Crossing, Yukon
- A refinery in Whitehorse, Yukon
- A total of 1,600 miles (2,600 km) of pipelines connecting Whitehorse to:
  - Norman Wells (Canol No. 1)
  - Skagway (Canol No.2)
  - Watson Lake (Canol No.3), and
  - Fairbanks (Canol No. 4)
- A telegraph system connecting all key points of the project

=== Survey ===
In 1942, non-indigenous people had limited knowledge of the area between Norman Wells and Whitehorse, as the Mountain Dene or Shutagot'ine would come down from the mountains to trade with settlers along the Mackenzie River. BPC hired a land surveyor named Guy Blanchet to identify a route. Interviews with Dene from Fort Norman (now Tulita) identified a trail through the Mackenzie Mountains that was the most suitable, and in October 1942 Blanchet, four guides from Fort Norman (Fred Andrew, Little Edward Blondin, George Blondin, and Paul Wright) and two others set out by dog sled to survey the route that would eventually become the crossing of the pipeline over the Mackenzie Mountains. (though construction on the road had already begun by then) Subsequent surveys along this route by teams using heavy equipment were abandoned as the extreme cold caused machinery to fail. While there were several aerial photo projects, they were inconsistent and it is not clear how much they were used to guide location. Typically, much of the route decisions were made during construction, resulting in numerous "false starts" and reroutes of the road.

=== Logistics ===
Much of the pipeline and equipment for the eastern section of Canol No.1 was moved by rail to Waterways, Alberta (today a suburb of Fort McMurray), where it was transferred to barges to take it up the Athabasca River. The Army was initially unaware that the unnavigable Slave Rapids made navigation to Great Slave Lake impossible, and barges had to be portaged by truck from Fort Fitzgerald to Fort Smith. Once the Mackenzie River froze over, the army constructed an ice road to Norman Wells.

The work of loading barges cutting wood to supply the boilers of paddle boats was assigned to the 388th Engineer Battalion (Separate), a segregated unit of 1,000 black men with white officers from Camp Claiborne, Louisiana. The men of the 388th were given the most demanding work, and were the lowest priority for rations, equipment, and accommodations, with some of them spending the harsh sub-arctic winter in tents.

The western portion of the Canol was comparatively easy to supply, as supplies could be shipped to the port Skagway and then transported to Whitehorse on the White Pass Railroad.

=== Building the pipeline ===
The pipeline itself was built by the civilian BPC consortium, which hired 52,900 people, mostly men who were ineligible for military service. While the contractors were permitted to hire Canadian workers, the Canadian government did not want the Canada's wartime industries to lose workers to what was seen as a U.S. project, and Canadians made up less than 20% of the workers on the project. While BPC emphasized the challenging conditions in its hiring, with posters warning prospective workers that they "will be required to work and live under the most extreme conditions imaginable," the project experience high rates of turnover, with 28,000 workers not finishing their 9-month contracts.

The pipeline was just 4 inches (10 cm) in diameter. The low gravity crude oil from Norman Wells had a pour point well below the freezing mark and could be run through a narrow pipeline without being heated. The pipeline was laid on the surface of the ground to simplify construction and maintenance. Ten pump stations were needed to move the crude oil to Whitehorse. The pumps were specially designed to be able to use the Norman Wells crude as fuel. An additional 19 pump stations moved the refined fuel along the Alaska Highway from Whitehorse as far as Watson Lake and Fairbanks.

The Whitehorse refinery was purchased used and shipped up from Corpus Christi, Texas. It was operated by Standard Oil and located in the Marwell Industrial Area north of present-day Downtown Whitehorse.

The final construction cost for the Canol Project construction has been estimated at US$133 million (equivalent to $2.432466919×10^{9} in 2025) and may have been closer to $300 million when military personnel are included.

== Operation ==
The last pipeline weld was completed on February 16, 1944, near Macmillan Pass. Oil first entered the pipeline at Norman Wells on 19 December 1943, but due to construction issues oil did not reach the Whitehorse refinery until 1 April 1945. The grand opening was held on April 30. Initially only able to produce gasoline, it was finally able to produce aviation gas in November 1944.

Over the life of the Canol No.1 pipeline 1,161,394 US barrels (138,485,200 L) were pumped into the line at Norman Wells. Only 83.7% of that arrived in Whitehorse. Most of the remaining 189,709 US barrels (22,621,000 L) is believed to have been lost due to pipeline breaks. The pipeline had been fully operational for 331 days when it was shut down on 13 March 1945.

=== Camps and pump stations ===
The Canol System had a network of manned pump stations and maintenance camps, many of which were not remediated until decades after the project was shut down.

Canol No. 1 Pumping stations and camps
Name	Location	Notes	Status
Pump Station No. 1 "Camp Canol"	Mile 8 65.2394°N 127.1075°W	Base camp on the Mackenzie River, included airstrip	Demolished by Imperial Oil in 1977
Pump Station No. 2 "Dodo Canyon"	Mile 36.5 64.8983°N 127.2606°W		Site remediated 2019, pumphouse and garage left standing but boarded up.
Little Keele River	Mile 50 64.7486°N 127.1239°W	Highway Maintenance Camp	Remediated 2019, no buildings remaining.
Little Keele River/Blue Mountain	Mile 67.5	Highway Maintenance Camp	Remediated 2019, no buildings remaining.
Pump Station No. 3 "Plains of Abraham"	Mile 76 64.6547°N 127.6356°W	Highway Maintenance Camp	Remediated 2019, some buildings and storage tanks remain but sealed.
Plains of Abraham	Mile 80 64.575°N 127.7333°W	Highway Maintenance Camp	Remediated 2019, no buildings remaining, but large amounts of historical equipment remain on site.
Bolstead Creek	Mile 100 64.4514°N 128.0478°W	Highway Maintenance Camp	Remediated 2019, no buildings remaining.
Pump Station No. 4 "Bolstead Creek"	Mile 108 64.3411°N 128.1°W		Remediated 2019, pumphouse and garage left standing but boarded up.
Twitya River	Mile 131 64.1333°N 128.3833°W	Highway Maintenance Camp	Remediated 2019, no buildings remaining, but large amounts of historical equipment remain on site.
Pump Station No. 5 "Ekwi River"	Mile 170 63.7469°N 128.7467°W		Remediated 2019, no buildings remaining, but large amounts of historical equipment remain on site.
Pump Station No. 6 "lntga River"	Mile 208 63.4319°N 129.5172°W		Remediated 2019, one building left standing but boarded up.
Tsichy River	Mile 22263.3°N 129.8189°W	Highway Maintenance Camp Last camp in the Northwest Territories.	Airstrip and NWT Government environmental station. Remediated 2019.
Macmillan River	Mile 238.5 (Macmillan Pass Airport)	Highway Maintenance Camp	Cleaned up 1975/76, except for three buildings left standing.
Macmillan River	Mile 246	Highway Maintenance Camp	Cleaned up 1975/76.
Macmillan River	Mile 279	Highway Maintenance Camp	Cleaned up 1975/76.
Pump Station No. 7 "Macmillan River"	Mile 280		Cleaned up 1975/76, except for one building left standing.
Sheldon Lake	Mile 299	Highway Maintenance Camp	Cleaned up 1975/76.
Ross River	Mile 372.4	Highway Maintenance Camp	?
Pump Station No. 8 "Orchie Lake"	Mile 337		Cleaned up 1975/76, except for one building left standing.
Pump Station No. 9 "Lapie River"	Mile 387		No structures remaining during 1975/76 cleanup operations, garbage removed.
Murphy Creek	Mile 491	Highway Maintenance Camp	?
Pump Station No. 10 "Gravel Creek"	Mile 437		Cleaned up 1975/76, except for one building left standing.
Camp Canol "Johnson's Crossing"	Mile 513 60.4897°N 133.2953°E	Highway Maintenance Camp	Buildings demolished 1974-1976.

Canol No. 2 Pumping stations
Name	Location	Notes	Status
Carcross	MP66 Klondike Highway	also part of Canol No. 3	Dismantled in 1974.
Summit	Summit of White Pass		?

Canol No. 3 Pumping stations
Name	Location	Notes	Status
Carcross	MP66 Klondike Highway	also part of Canol No. 2	Dismantled in 1974.
Station W	MP855 Alaska Highway		Site cleaned up, likely in 1975-1976.
Station X	MP794 Alaska Highway		Site destroyed in a forest fire in 1956 In 1996 site inspection the site was used as a firing range by a gun club.
Station Y	MP748 Alaska Highway 59.8888°N 131.4513°W		?
Station Z	MP693 Alaska Highway		?

Canol No. 4 Pumping stations
Name	Location	Notes	Status
Station A	Whitehorse		?
Station B	MP957 Alaska Highway60.7916°N 136.0083°W		No buildings left in 1996 inspection.
Station C	MP1000 Alaska Highway 60.8569°N 137.125°W		?
Station D	MP1036 Alaska Highway 60.925°N 137.9291°W		Only building foundations remained in 1996 assessment.
Station E	MP1081 Alaska Highway (Destruction Bay) 61.2291°N 138.75°W		Site repurposed for Haines-Fairbanks Pipeline pumping station.
Station F	MP1126 Alaska Highway		Temporarily repurposed as a highway maintenance camp in the 1950s, only pump building remained in 1996 inspection.
Station G	MP1166 Alaska Highway 62.4416°N 140.8583°W		Only building foundations remained in 1996 inspection.
Station H	MP1206 Alaska Highway (Beaver Creek)	Last station in Canada	?
Station I	62.8714°N 141.4816°W		?
Station J	63.2091°N 142.1963°W		Site now houses a private cabin.
Station K	Tanacross 63.3629°N 143.3511°W		?
Station L	Dot Lake63.6792°N 144.1559°W		Only foundations and debris observed in 2016 inspection.
Station M	Delta Junction 63.8908°N 145.1985°W		Only building foundations observed in 2019 site inspection.
Station N	Big Delta 64.2629°N 146.0981°W		?
Station O	Salcha64.4825°N 146.9738°W		?

== Decommissioning ==
Due to its remoteness and challenging conditions the costs to provide fuel from the Canol were considerably higher than having fuel arrive via tanker. On March 8, 1945, the US War Department made the decision to shut the project down. Work began immediately to winterize all equipment, clean and stock camps and remove all personnel.

The Canadian government had right of first refusal to purchase the pipeline, but prior to shutdown had already concluded that the cost of operating the project was far greater than shipping in oil. The U.S. Army hoped to find a private-sector buyer for the entire project, but was unsuccessful. Instead the project was sold off in pieces while Canol No. 1 was sold for scrap and abandoned.

Imperial Oil purchased equipment at Norman Wells for $3 million. Imperial also paid $1 million for the Whitehorse refinery, which had been installed at a cost of $27 million, which they then dismantled and shipped to Alberta. The salvage rights for the remainder of the line were sold for $700,000 and carried out by George Price of Dawson Creek, British Columbia. Some valuable equipment was salvaged but much of the pipeline, telegraph wire, vehicles and buildings were left in place.

The Skagway-Whitehorse (Canol No.2) and Whitehorse-Fairbanks (Canol No.4) sections remained in use for fuel delivery from tankers at the Port of Skagway to Whitehorse and Fairbanks until 1958, when it was replaced by the larger Haines-Fairbanks Pipeline. It was then sold to the White Pass & Yukon Company (WPY). WPY dismantled the Canol No.4 by 1962, but continued to operate Canol No.2 until 1994, when the pipeline was removed.

The Whitehorse refinery was dismantled in 1948 and shipped to Edmonton to process oil from the recent discovery at Leduc.

== Controversy ==
[I]n the spring of 1942, we had many needs for transportation, materials, and manpower on military and naval projects vital to the prosecution of the war, and we did not have sufficient of any of them to fill all of our needs. We had to study all of the projects and their possible contributions to the war effort, weigh them against each other, and allocate what we had to those projects which were most essential. It is in the light of this background and these facts that the Canol project must be judged.

— Senate Special Committee to Investigate the National Defense Program (the Truman Committee), Additional report of Special Committee report No. 10, Part 14

Canol, like the Alaska Highway project, involved a enormous investment of U.S. government resources in a foreign country. This attracted criticism that became stronger as the Army's rationale for the project began to appear weaker.

In 1942 the Budget Bureau conducted a review of the project, and recommended the Norman Wells-Whitehorse portion be cancelled in favour of shipping oil through the Skagway-Whitehorse Pipeline. The Army maintained that the project that was a wartime necessity.

In 1943 the Truman Committee struck a subcommittee investigate the project, which travelled to the Yukon and held hearings in Washington. During hearings both Colonel Graham and Under Secretary of War Robert P. Patterson, defended the project, with Paterson comparing it to the allied landing at Salerno and arguing that the fuel the project would provide to Alaska was invaluable. This causing Hugh Fulton, the Truman Committee's Chief Counsel to burst into laughter. When Patterson asked Fulton why he was laughing, Fulton replied "I have been laughing at the concept that any supply, no matter what it was, would be valuable, without regard to the cost in man-hours and materials together."

In January 1944 the Committee reported to the Senate on the Canol Project. It reported that the project had begun without an understanding of costs or sufficient technical review, the completion date was impossible, there had been no consideration of alternatives, and the Army had ignored warnings from experts on the exceptional difficulty and expense of the project. The Committee concluded by stating that "Instead of making a contribution to the war effort, the project was a drain on our resources during 1942 and 1943."

The Committee recommended the project be cancelled. However when Senators discovered additional funding for Canol in an appropriations bill, Senator Ferguson argued against defunding the project, as he did not want to second guess the decisions of the Joint Chiefs of Staff during wartime. Ferguson called for a review of their decision after the war ended.

In 1946, with the end of the war and the idling of the Whitehorse refinery, the Truman Committee requested that Admiral Ernest J. King, who had since retired, provide the additional justification for the project used by the Joint Chiefs of Staff, as there was no longer a need for wartime secrecy. The Committee found the reply unsatisfactory, and complained that it was simply a reiteration of the statement that Canol was important to undisclosed military plans.

In its postwar reporting to the Senate, the Truman Committee cited the Canol project as prime example of wartime waste driven by officers who refused to admit their mistakes and insisted projects continue even as they consumed enormous amounts of scarce resources. This extreme waste "if accomplished by a saboteur would have resulted in execution." In the Committee's opinion, the damage to the war effort caused by the wastefulness of Canol far exceeded the damage caused by actual enemy sabotage.

== Current status ==
The Canol Road is still seasonally maintained within the Yukon and is known as Highway 6. A ferry in the community of Ross River, Yukon is used to cross the Pelly River. There are several old vehicle dumps remaining on the Yukon side and an old pipeline crossing remains in Ross River. The bridge has been used as a footbridge and was refurbished in 2018.

In the Northwest Territories the road is no longer maintained and is now the Canol Heritage Trail. It is estimated that 46,000 barrels of crude oil were spilled along the pipeline route. Many of the abandoned buildings and vehicles contain hazardous materials and telegraph wire has entangled animals such as moose and caribou. Clean-up of telegraph wire began in 2015 and most of the wire along the trail has been coiled up for removal. Remediation work began in 2018 to remove contaminants, telegraph wire and other safety hazards along the trail and expected to be completed in 2020. Remediation of the trail will allow the creation of Doi T'oh territorial park to proceed as set out in the Sahtu Dene and Metis Comprehensive Land Claim Agreement.

Cleanup began in 2018 at the former site of the refinery in Whitehorse, known locally as the Marwell tar pit. Work was expected to be completed in 2020 at a cost of almost $7 million.

Imperial Oil's Norman Wells operations continued after the closure of the Canol pipeline, supplying local demand up and down the Mackenzie River with barges. Additional wells and a new processing facility were opened in 1985, alongside Enbridge's Line 21 pipeline, which links Norman Wells to the broader Canadian pipeline network at Zama City, Alberta along a much simpler southeastern route that follows the Mackenzie River. Production at Norman Wells is scheduled to end in the 3rd quarter of 2026, with reclamation work to begin in 2030 once a reclamation plan is developed.

== See also ==
- Big Inch, a WWII-era U.S. Government pipeline project in the Contiguous United States
- Oil campaign of World War II Allied attacks on the petroleum supply of Nazi Germany in Europe.
- Canol Road
- Canol Heritage Trail
