= MGM Energy =

MGM Energy Corp.
- Company type: Public
- Traded as: TSX: MGX
- Industry: Conventional Oil & Natural Gas
- Headquarters: Calgary, Alberta, Canada
- Key people: Henry W. Sykes (CEO)
- Parent: Paramount Resources
- Website: www.mgmenergy.com

MGM Energy Corp. is a Canadian petroleum company that was spun off from Paramount Resources in 2007. The company is involved in the acquisition and development of petroleum in Canada's Northwest Territories. The CEO is Henry Sykes. In October 2013 Sykes complained that the requirement to conduct environmental assessments was impeding Canadian companies, compared with their US competitors, when his firm was seeking permission to engage in hydraulic fracking in the environmentally sensitive Canol shale play region—even though the first fracking well were drilled without any environmental assessment at all.
