= Canol Heritage Trail =

Multiuse trail in Yukon and Northwest Territories, Canada

Coordinates: 63°9′9.1″N 129°55′47.3″W

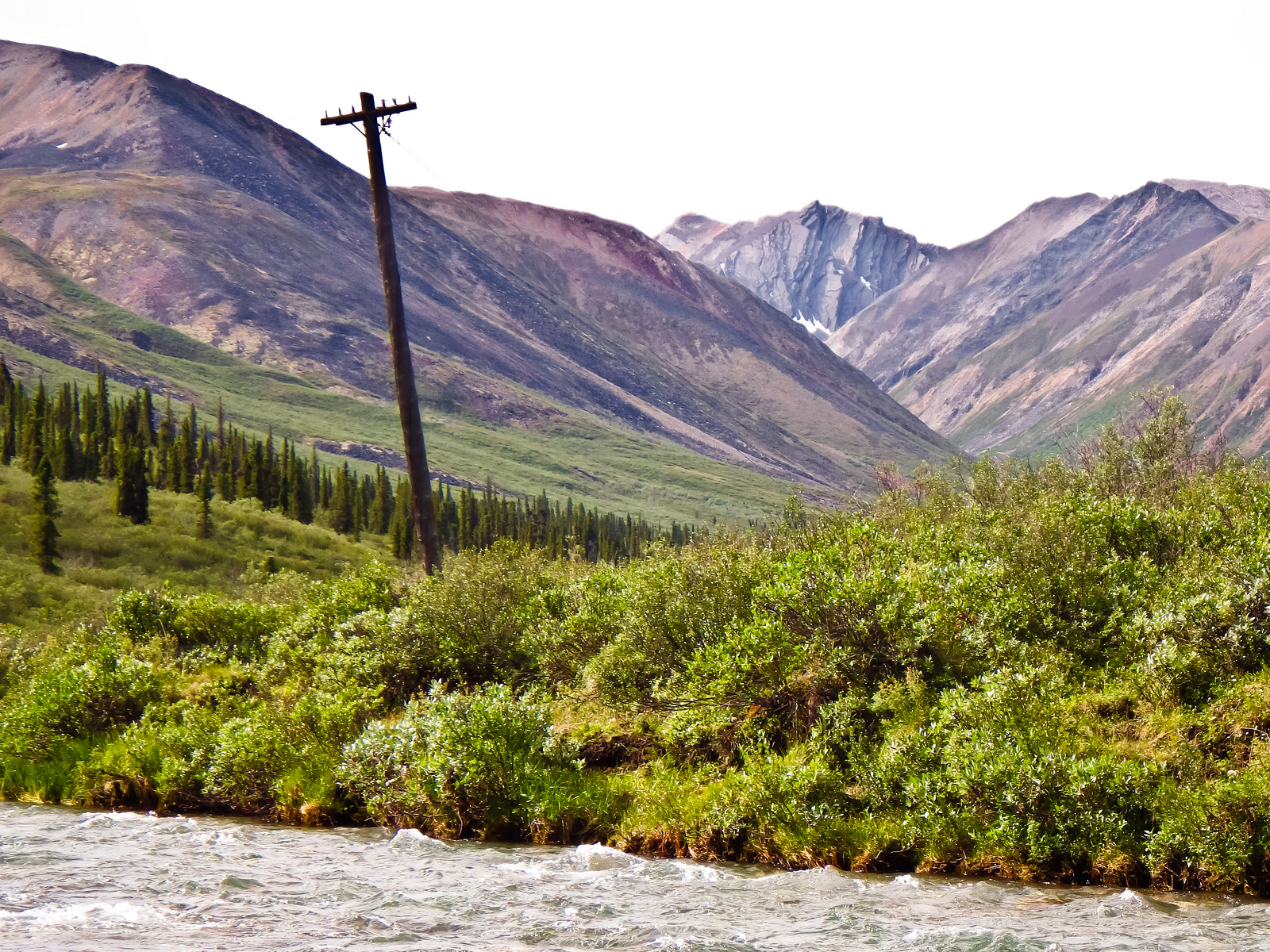
Telegraph pole beside Ekwi River

The Canol Heritage Trail is a 350-kilometre-long (220 mi) trail running from Norman Wells, Northwest Territories, through the Mackenzie Mountains, to the Yukon border. Because of its remoteness, length and river crossings it is considered one of the most challenging trails in Canada. The trail is in the process of becoming a territorial park.

== History ==
The trail follows the route of the Canol Road lying within the Northwest Territories where it is no longer maintained beyond the Yukon border. The road was constructed during the Second World War by the United States Army Corps of Engineers to build and service a pipeline bringing oil from Norman Wells to a refinery in Whitehorse, Yukon. Though built at huge expense, it was abandoned after only thirteen months of operation.

== Logistics ==
The eastern end of the trail is at Milepost 4, across the Mackenzie River from Norman Wells, requiring arrangements to be made to cross the river by either air or boat. The western end can be reached by plane from either Norman Wells or Whitehorse. In summer, it can also be reached by road along Yukon Highway 6/North Canol Road. The road receives minimal maintenance and can be a rough ride up to the Yukon-NWT border where it is no longer maintained and quickly becomes impassable to most vehicles. The western end of the trail is officially the airstrip at Milepost 222 in the NWT. The small airstrip at Macmillan Pass near the Yukon border is also used, which brings the total distance to the Mackenzie River to 375 kilometres (233 mi).

Due to its length and difficulty, it should only be undertaken by experienced and fit hikers. Most hikers will take between 14 and 22 days to complete the trail. There are no services along the trail and, though it has been hiked with no resupply, most people arrange for one to three food drops to be made by aircraft. The fastest known time to hike the trail is just over 5 days.

Major river crossings include the third and fourth crossings of the Ekwi, the Twitya, the Little Keele and the second crossing of the Carcajou. Depending on water levels these can be difficult or impossible to cross on foot. There are also many smaller creek and river crossings that may be difficult at high water. A hiker died in 2016 after being swept away crossing the Little Keele. In 2016 a seasonal cable ferry system was tested to provide a safer crossing of the Twitya, however it has not been reinstalled.

In 2018 the Government of the Northwest Territories began building emergency shelters on the trail. As of 2025, nine shelters have been completed with plans to add more.

The trail crosses grizzly bear and black bear habitat, so precautions should be taken.

== Environmental clean-up and park status ==
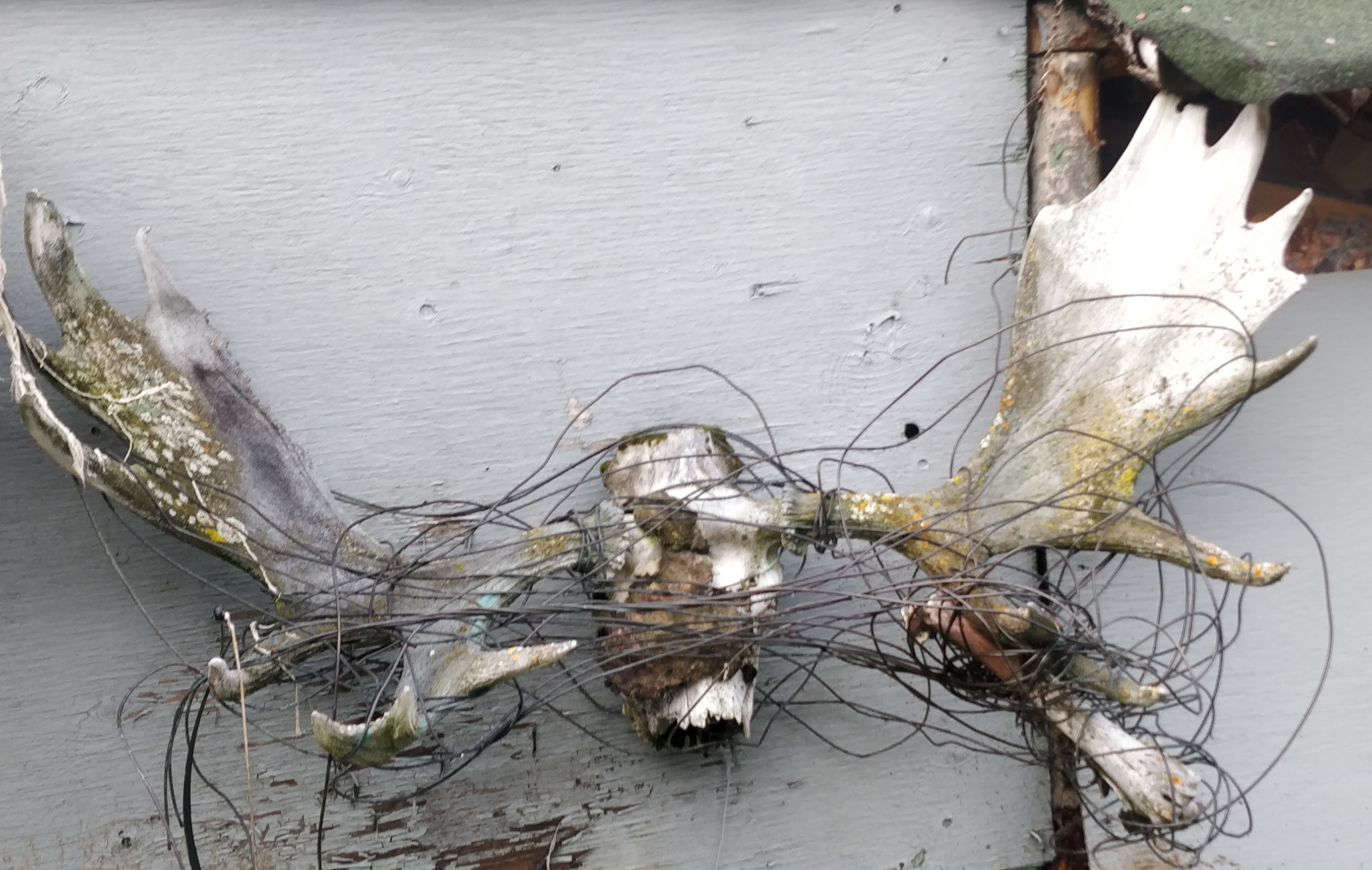
A set of moose antlers tangled in telephone wires at Mile 170 on the Canol Trail

After the Americans decided the Canol project was a failure, it was abandoned and sold for scrap to Imperial Oil. Some valuable equipment was salvaged but a great deal of pipeline, wire, vehicles and buildings remained as well as various contaminants.

Clean-up of telegraph wire began in 2015 and at the end of 2016 over 70% of wire on the trail had been cut and stockpiled for future removal. Work to remove contaminants, collect bundles of wire, secure standing buildings and address physical hazards was completed between 2017 and 2019 and long-term monitoring is now underway. Remediation of the trail will allow the creation of a territorial park to proceed as set out in the Sahtu Dene and Metis Comprehensive Land Claim Agreement.

In 2021, the trail was designated as part of the Trans Canada Trail network.

== Other modes of travel ==
The first successful summer motorized expedition, crossing from Ross River, YT to Norman Wells, NWT, occurred in July 1973. Unassisted, seven Honda ATC90 trikes and riders traveled 589 km (366 mi) in 10 days.

The entire trail was first completed by bicycle in 1991. In 2012 the trail was completed in eight days, with no food drops, from Macmillan Pass to the Mackenzie River using mountain bikes and packrafts and since that time cycling attempts have become more common.

The trail has been traversed by snowmobile and dog team in the winter and by All-terrain vehicle in the summer.

Attempts to travel it by off road vehicles in 2009 and 2011 sparked controversy in the Northwest Territories over motorized use of the trail.

== Images ==
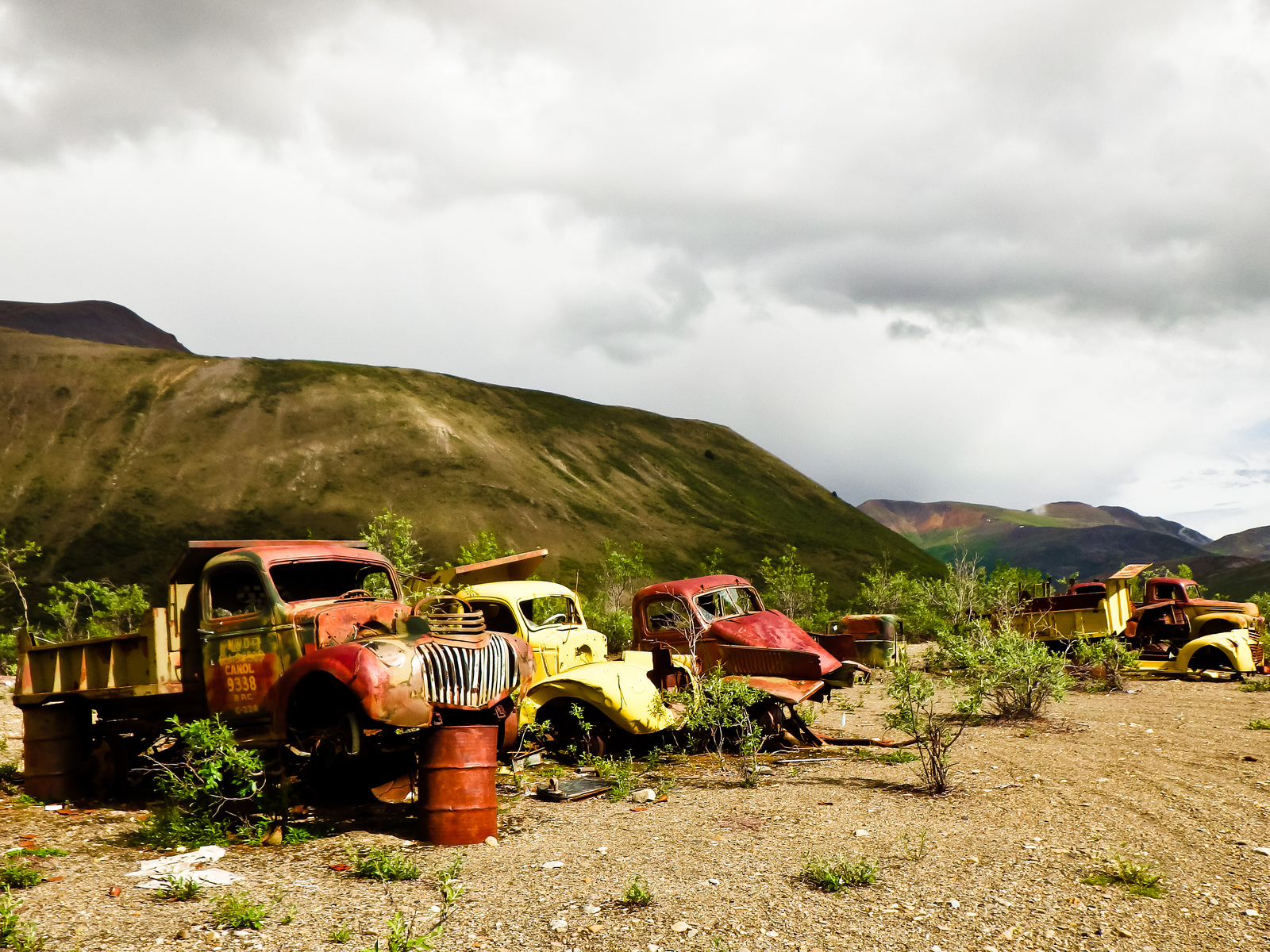
Abandoned trucks near Mile 222

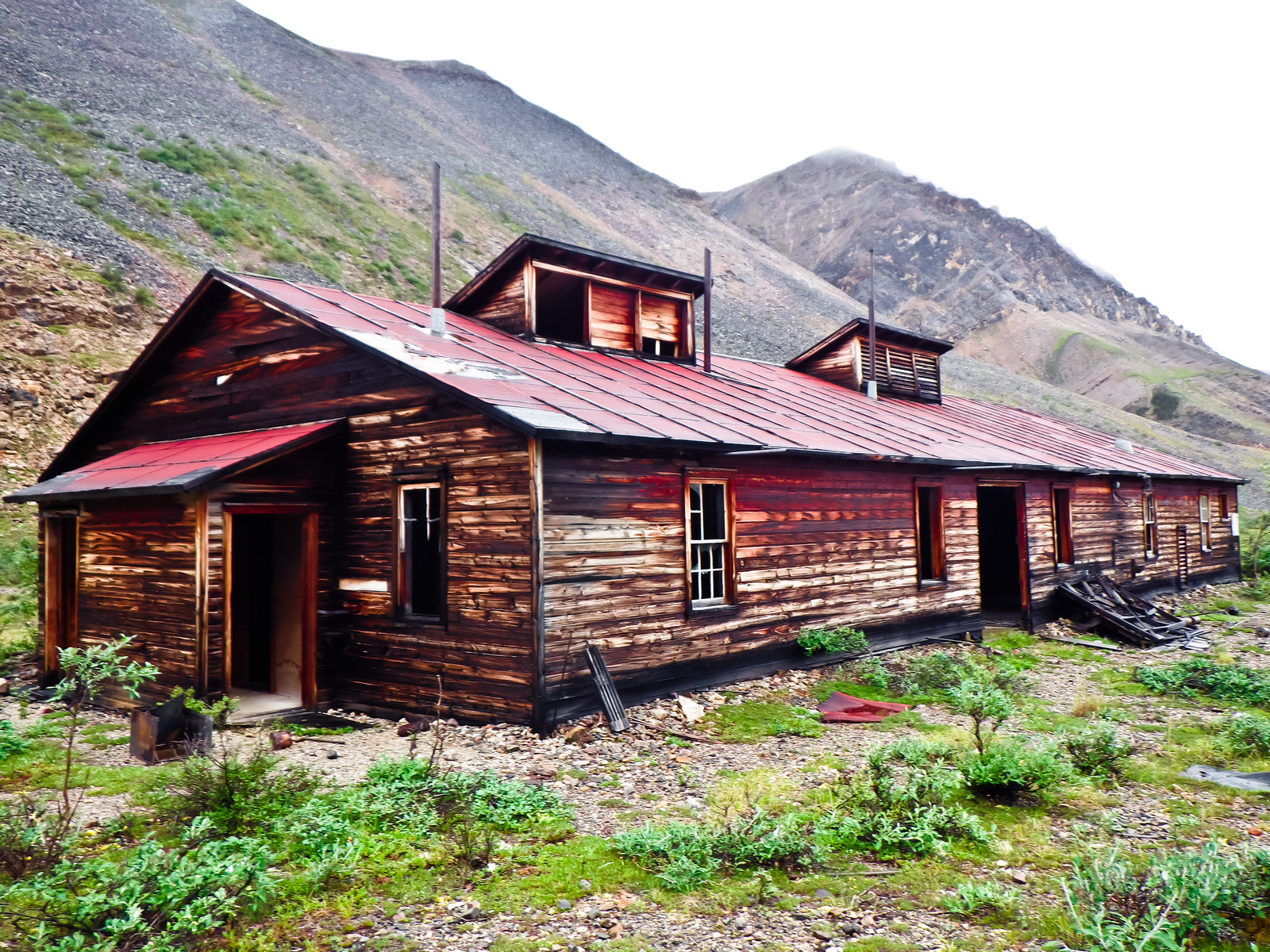
Pump station at Mile 108

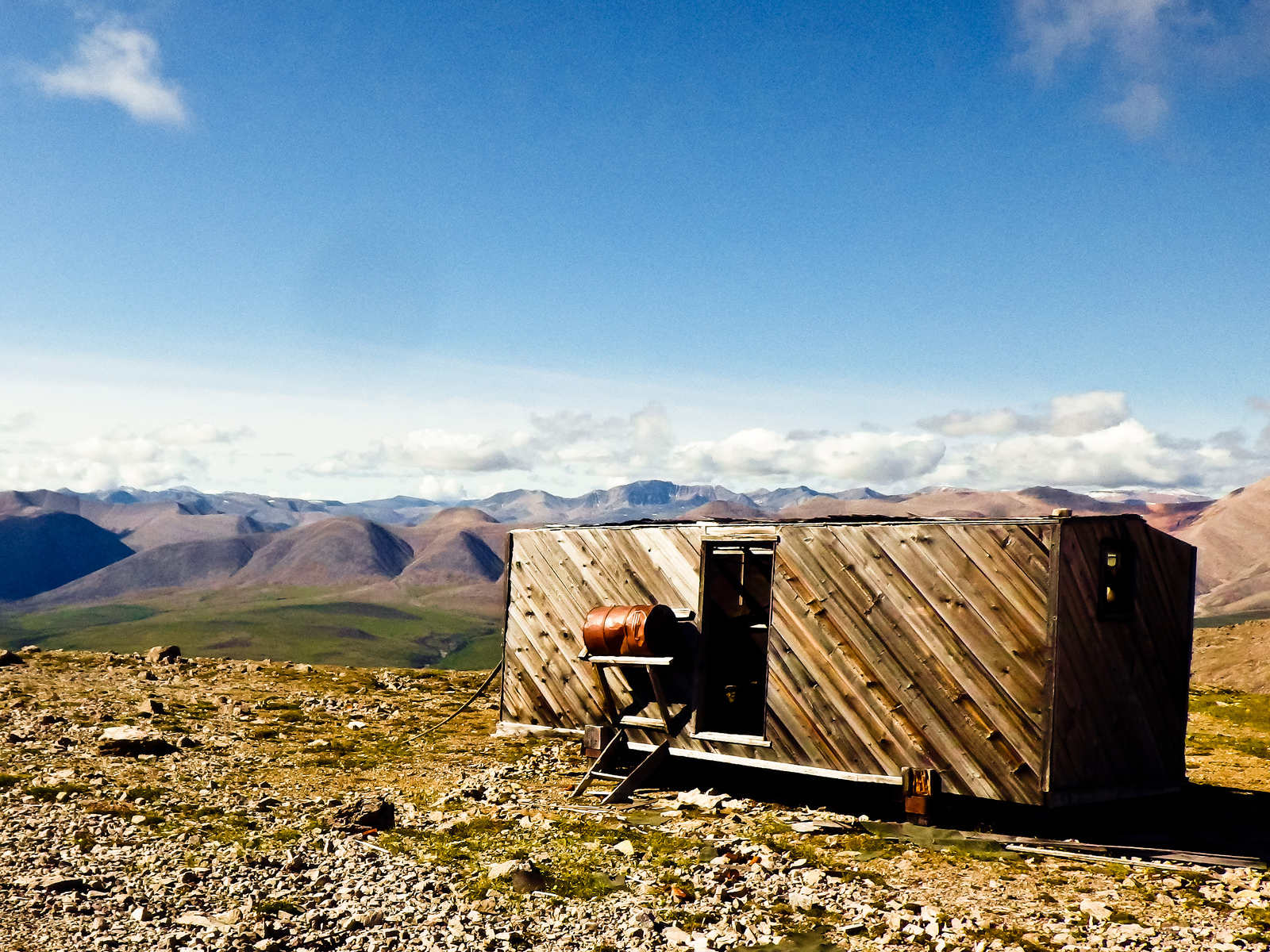
Wanagon on the Plains of Abraham

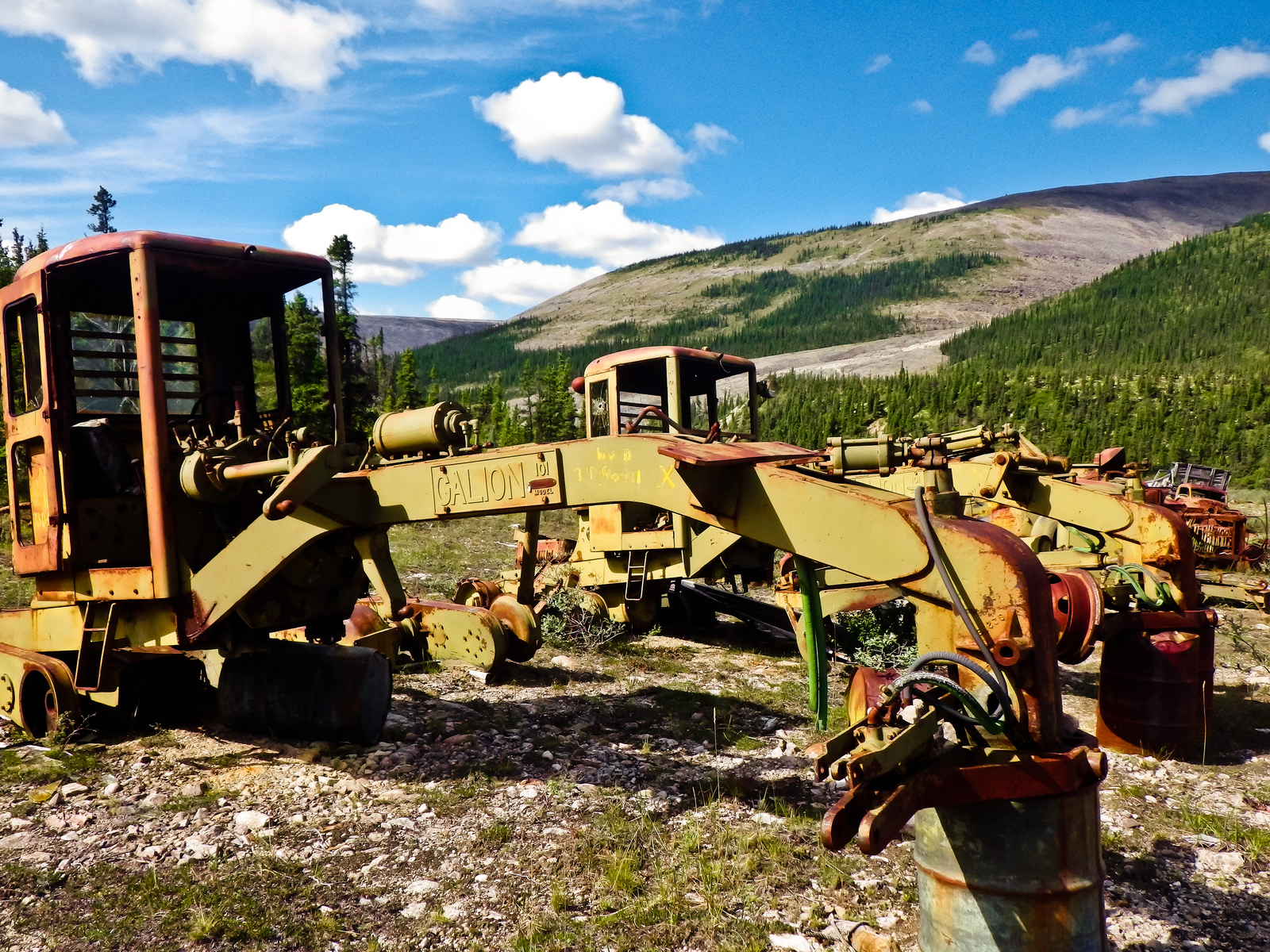
Graders at Little Keele River

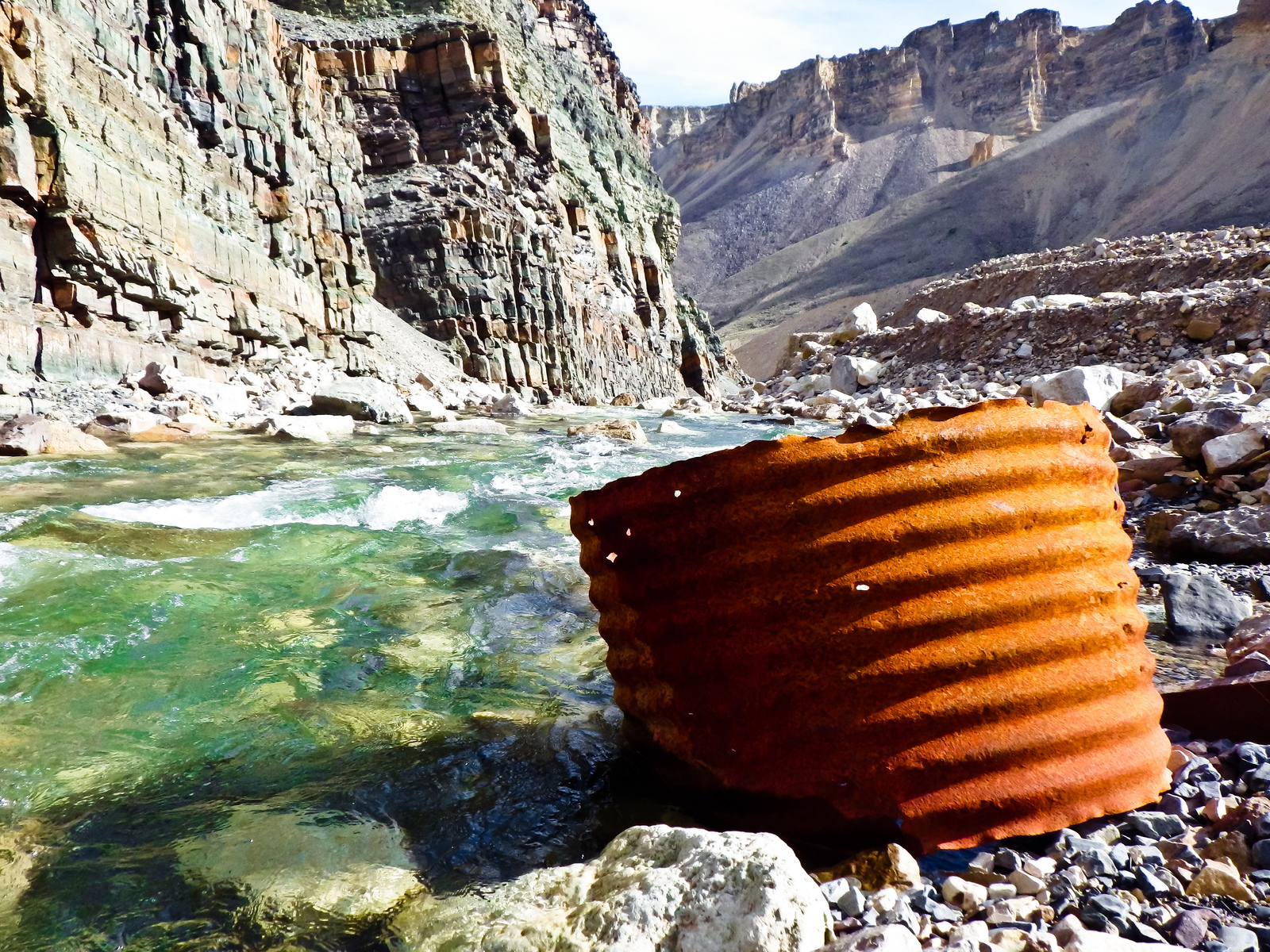
Dodo Canyon
