= Sahtu Divisional Education Council =

School district in Northwest Territories, Canada

Address
- 1 Harbourview Crescent, Box 9 Sahtu Region Norman Wells, Northwest Territories, X0E 0V0; Canada

District information
- Type: Public
- Grades: JK-12
- Superintendent: Lorraine Kuer
- School board: 6 trustees
- Chair of the board: Heather Bourassa
- Schools: 5

Students and staff
- Students: 936 (Note: Student enrollment as of the 2022 / 2023 school year)
- Staff: 8 (Note: Board office staff only)

Other information
- Website: Official website

The Sahtu Divisional Education Council is the public school board for the Sahtu Region, in the Northwest Territories. Located in Norman Wells, the education council represents five schools in five communities.

As of 2024, the board is made up of five trustees and a chair, Heather Bourassa from Fort Good Hope.

== List of schools ==
The following are the schools in the SDEC

Community	School	Grades	Principal	Staff (Note: Includes all support staff)	Students	Notes / References
Colville Lake	Colville Lake School	JK – 12	Mitchell MacDonald	17	99	
Délı̨nę	Ɂehtseo Ayha School	JK – 12	Jason Dayman	25	210	
Fort Good Hope	Chief T'Selehye School	JK – 12	Richard Darrah	27	232	
Norman Wells	Mackenzie Mountain School	JK – 12	Matthew Zink	25	228	
Tulita	Chief Albert Wright School	JK – 12	Stephen Slattery	20	167	
