= Northern Journal =

Coordinates: 60°00′24″N 111°53′17″W

- Type: Weekly newspaper
- Founder: Don Jaque
- Publisher: Don Jaque
- Editor: Craig Gilbert
- Managing editor: Don Jaque
- Photo editor: Paul Bannister
- Staff writers: Dali Carmichael
- Founded: 1977
- Language: English
- Headquarters: 207 McDougal Road, P.O. Box 990, Fort Smith, N.W.T. Canada X0E 0P0
- Country: Canada
- ISSN: 0707-4964
- Website: http://www.norj.ca

The Northern Journal was a weekly newspaper based out of Fort Smith, Northwest Territories, Canada.

== History ==
The newspaper was founded in 1977 as the Slave River Journal. In 2011, owner and publisher Don Jaque renamed the paper to expand its coverage beyond Fort Smith. The Northern Journal had a stated circulation of 4,000, as of June 2013.

Coverage of the Northern Journal included Fort Smith, the N.W.T.'s South Slave region, Fort Chipewyan and the oilsands industry near Fort McMurray. Staff were based in the Fort Smith newsroom, although the newspaper also relied on freelancers across the Northwest Territories and had regular contributors based in Yellowknife.

Jaque announced on March 1, 2016 that the newspaper would be closing because of "a perfect storm" of circumstances.

The region's small population and business community made it difficult to keep the newspaper profitable. Most businesses had also moved their advertising to Facebook.

The newspaper had also lost advertising from oil companies because of coverage of health concerns towards the oilsands shared by people living in Fort McKay and Fort Chipewyan. The collapsing oil prices of the 2010s oil glut forced most remaining businesses to withdraw advertising.

The biggest shortfall came when the government of the Northwest Territories stopped advertising.
