= Johnsons Crossing =

Settlement in Yukon, Canada

Coordinates: 60°29′21.93″N 133°17′40.33″W

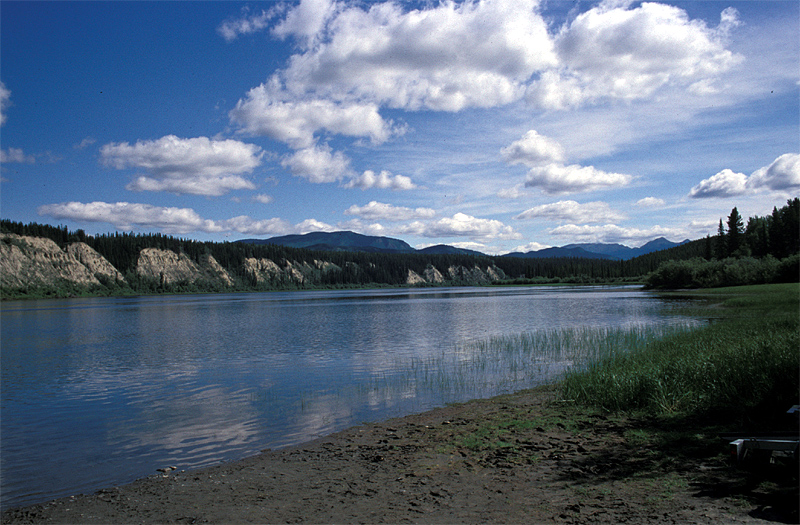
Teslin River in Yukon, British Columbia

Johnsons Crossing or Johnson's Crossing is a settlement in Yukon, Canada. It is located at historical mile 836 of the Alaska Highway, at the junction of the Canol Road where the highway crosses the Teslin River.

== Geography ==
=== Climate ===
Climate data for Johnsons Crossing
Month	Jan	Feb	Mar	Apr	May	Jun	Jul	Aug	Sep	Oct	Nov	Dec	Year
Record high °C (°F)	7.2 (45.0)	12.2 (54.0)	12.8 (55.0)	20.6 (69.1)	34.0 (93.2)	32.2 (90.0)	31.1 (88.0)	31.0 (87.8)	25.6 (78.1)	18.0 (64.4)	8.9 (48.0)	7.5 (45.5)	34.0 (93.2)
Mean daily maximum °C (°F)	−11.7 (10.9)	−8.8 (16.2)	0.5 (32.9)	6.9 (44.4)	13.4 (56.1)	18.8 (65.8)	20.6 (69.1)	18.3 (64.9)	12.1 (53.8)	3.9 (39.0)	−6.4 (20.5)	−10.4 (13.3)	4.8 (40.6)
Daily mean °C (°F)	−16.2 (2.8)	−14.6 (5.7)	−6.2 (20.8)	0.4 (32.7)	6.4 (43.5)	11.2 (52.2)	13.6 (56.5)	11.4 (52.5)	6.4 (43.5)	0.0 (32.0)	−10.5 (13.1)	−14.8 (5.4)	−1.1 (30.0)
Mean daily minimum °C (°F)	−20.7 (−5.3)	−20.4 (−4.7)	−12.9 (8.8)	−6.1 (21.0)	−0.7 (30.7)	3.6 (38.5)	6.6 (43.9)	4.5 (40.1)	0.7 (33.3)	−3.8 (25.2)	−14.5 (5.9)	−19.3 (−2.7)	−6.9 (19.6)
Record low °C (°F)	−52.2 (−62.0)	−51.2 (−60.2)	−40.6 (−41.1)	−27.5 (−17.5)	−11.1 (12.0)	−3.9 (25.0)	−2.2 (28.0)	−4.0 (24.8)	−16.0 (3.2)	−31.0 (−23.8)	−42.0 (−43.6)	−55.0 (−67.0)	−55.0 (−67.0)
Average precipitation mm (inches)	29.9 (1.18)	20.0 (0.79)	13.6 (0.54)	8.8 (0.35)	22.8 (0.90)	40.4 (1.59)	56.2 (2.21)	45.0 (1.77)	52.0 (2.05)	39.1 (1.54)	34.8 (1.37)	28.4 (1.12)	391.0 (15.39)
Average rainfall mm (inches)	0.0 (0.0)	0.0 (0.0)	0.0 (0.0)	1.8 (0.07)	22.2 (0.87)	40.4 (1.59)	56.2 (2.21)	45.0 (1.77)	49.9 (1.96)	25.0 (0.98)	2.0 (0.08)	0.0 (0.0)	242.6 (9.55)
Average snowfall cm (inches)	29.9 (11.8)	20.0 (7.9)	13.6 (5.4)	6.9 (2.7)	0.6 (0.2)	0.0 (0.0)	0.0 (0.0)	0.1 (0.0)	2.1 (0.8)	14.1 (5.6)	32.8 (12.9)	28.4 (11.2)	148.5 (58.5)
Average precipitation days (≥ 0.2 mm)	9.4	6.9	5.6	3.9	8.6	12.2	14.6	12.2	12.8	12.6	13.4	10.1	122.2
Average rainy days (≥ 0.2 mm)	0.0	0.0	0.0	1.1	8.5	12.2	14.6	12.1	12.6	8.2	0.9	0.0	70.1
Average snowy days (≥ 0.2 cm)	9.4	6.9	5.6	2.9	0.4	0.0	0.0	0.1	0.4	5.5	12.5	10.1	53.9
Source: Environment Canada Canadian Climate Normals 1981–2010

== Demographics ==
Federal census population history of Johnsons Crossing
Year	Pop.	±%
1981	13	—
1986	18	+38.5%
1991	17	−5.6%
1996	5	−70.6%
2001	20	+300.0%
2006	15	−25.0%
2011	15	+0.0%
2016	10	−33.3%
2021	10	+0.0%
Source: Statistics Canada

In the 2021 Census of Population conducted by Statistics Canada, Johnsons Crossing had a population of 10 living in 3 of its 12 total private dwellings, a change of 0% from its 2016 population of 10. With a land area of 21.98 km^{2} (8.49 sq mi), it had a population density of 0.5/km^{2} (1.2/sq mi) in 2021.
