= Norman Wells =

Norman Wells Tłegǫ́hłı̨ The Wells
- Town
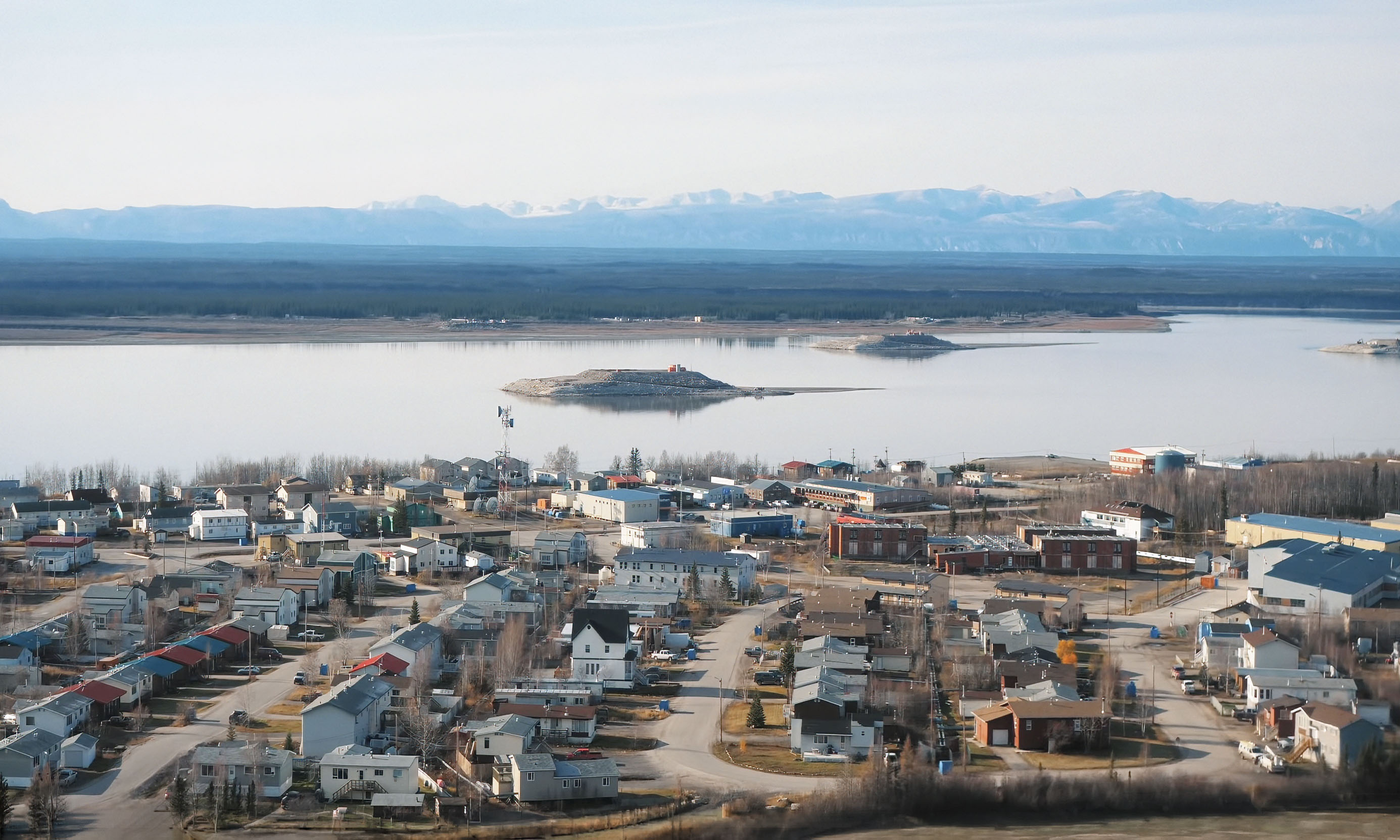
- Norman Wells with the Mackenzie River in the background, 2019
- Motto: Where Adventures Begin
- Location within Northwest Territories Location within Canada
- Coordinates: 65°16′52″N 126°49′54″W
- Country: Canada
- Territory: Northwest Territories
- Region: Sahtu
- Settlement area: Sahtu
- Constituency: Sahtu
- Incorporated (town): 12 April 1992

Government
  - Mayor: Frank Pope
  - Senior Administrative Officer: Cathy Clarke
  - MLA: Daniel McNeely

Area (2021)
  - Land: 82.09 km^{2} (31.70 sq mi)
- Elevation: 73 m (240 ft)

Population (2021)
  - Total: 673
  - Density: 9.2/km^{2} (24/sq mi)
- Time zone: UTC−06:00 (Northwest Territories Time)
- Canadian postal code: X0E 0V0
- Area code: 867
- Telephone exchange: 587
- Living cost (2018): 162.5^{A}
- Food price index (2019): 170.5^{B}
- Website: www.normanwells.com
- Sources: Department of Municipal and Community Affairs, Prince of Wales Northern Heritage Centre, Canada Flight Supplement^A2018 figure based on Edmonton = 100^B2019 figure based on Yellowknife = 100

Norman Wells (Slavey language: Tłegǫ́hłı̨ [t͡ɬʰɛkṍhɬĩ] "where there is oil") is a town located in the Sahtu Region, Northwest Territories, Canada. The town, which hosts the Sahtu Regional office, is situated on the north side of the Mackenzie River and provides a view down the valley of the Franklin and Richardson mountains.

== Demographics ==
In the 2021 Canadian census conducted by Statistics Canada, Norman Wells had a population of 673 living in 269 of its 404 total private dwellings, a change of −13.5% from its 2016 population of 778. With a land area of 82.09 km^{2} (31.70 sq mi), it had a population density of 8.2/km^{2} (21.2/sq mi) in 2021.

A total of 315 people identified as Indigenous, and of these, 195 were First Nations, 80 were Métis, 15 were Inuit and 20 gave multiple Indigenous responses. The main languages in the town are North Slavey and English. Of the population, 78.1% is 15 and older, with the median age being 32.8, slightly less than the NWT averages of 79.3% and 34.0.

Federal census population history of Norman Wells
Year	Pop.	±%
1976	367	—
1981	420	+14.4%
1986	627	+49.3%
1991	627	+0.0%
1996	798	+27.3%
2001	775	−2.9%
2006	761	−1.8%
2011	727	−4.5%
2016	778	+7.0%
2021	673	−13.5%
Source: Statistics Canada

Annual population estimates

Year	Pop.	±%
1996	840	—
1997	808	−3.8%
1998	826	+2.2%
1999	747	−9.6%
2000	755	+1.1%
2001	762	+0.9%
2002	744	−2.4%
2003	798	+7.3%
2004	837	+4.9%
2005	826	−1.3%
2006	802	−2.9%
2007	821	+2.4%

Year	Pop.	±%
2008	782	−4.8%
2009	779	−0.4%
2010	763	−2.1%
2011	772	+1.2%
2012	763	−1.2%
2013	789	+3.4%
2014	777	−1.5%
2015	805	+3.6%
2016	816	+1.4%
2017	809	−0.9%
2018	804	−0.6%
2019	768	−4.5%

Sources: NWT Bureau of Statistics (2008–2019), NWT Bureau of Statistics (2001–2017)

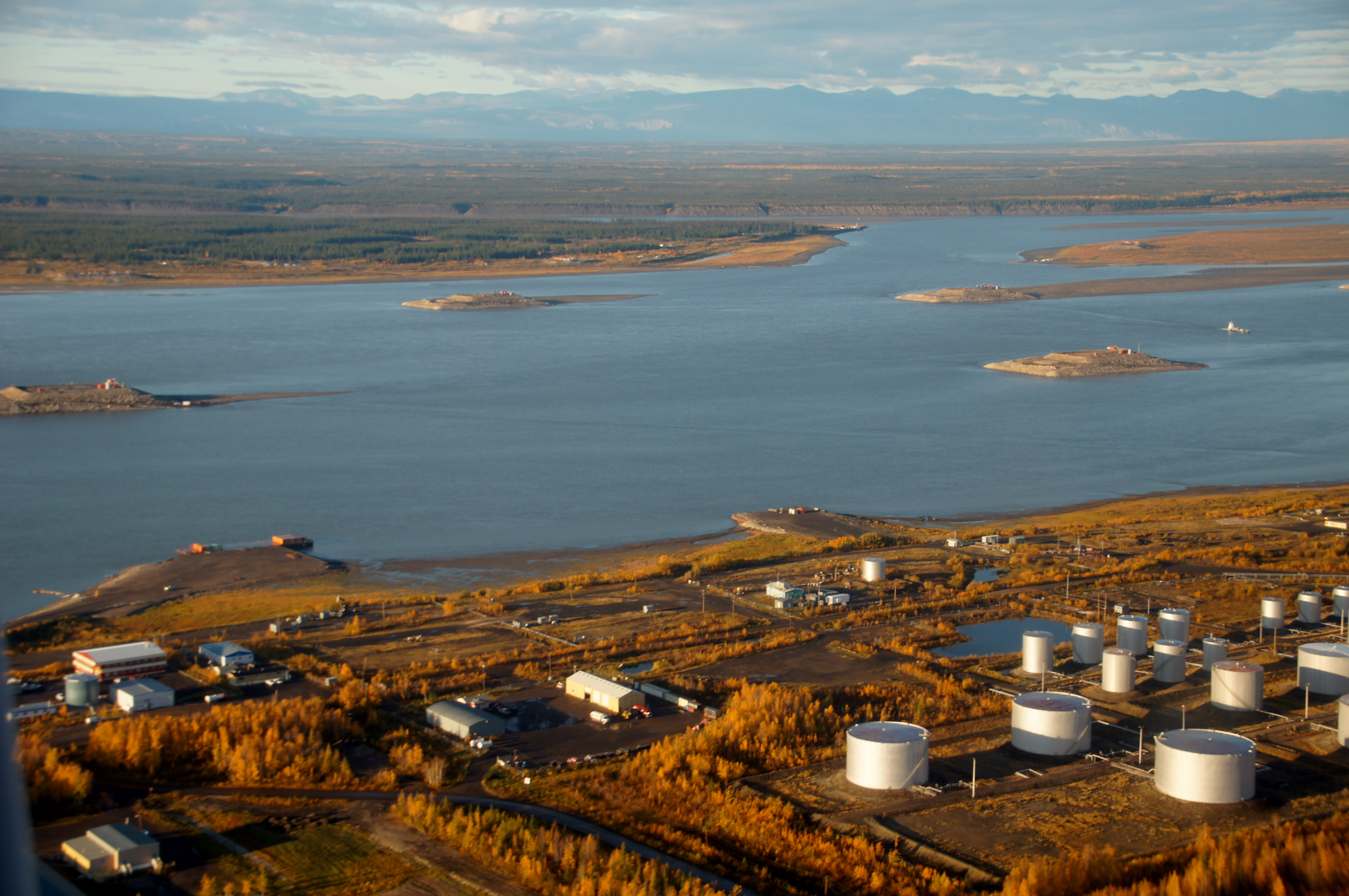
The artificial islands used as drilling platforms to the oil deposits underneath the Mackenzie River (Dehcho River) are clearly visible on takeoff from the Norman Wells airport, Norman Wells, Northwest Territories, Canada.

== History ==
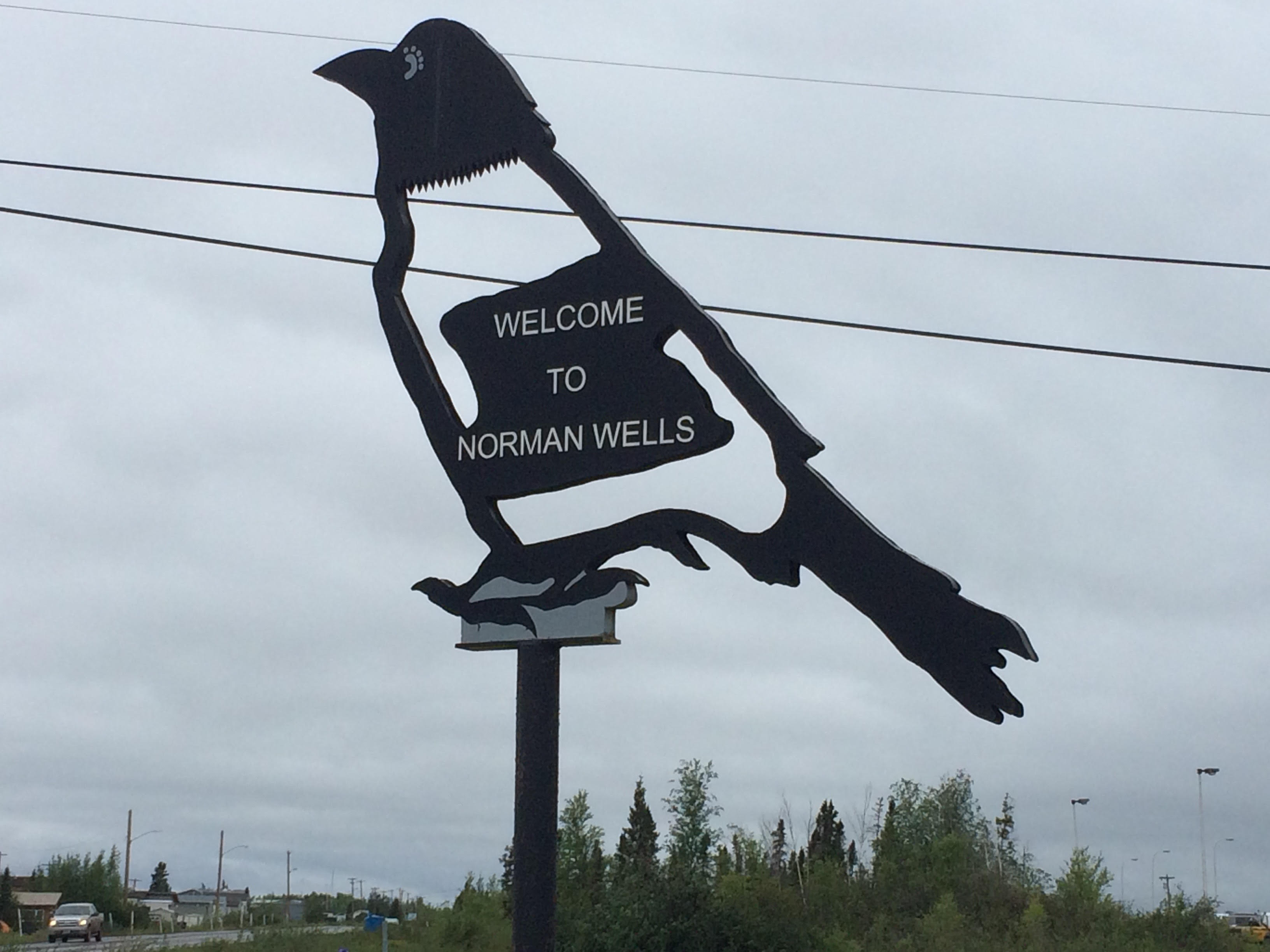
Welcome sign

While the first discovery of petroleum along the Mackenzie River is typically attributed to Alexander Mackenzie during his exploration of the river in 1789, Mackenzie's journal describes a waxy, yellow substance that may instead be fossilized plant resin. On his 1888 trip up the Mackenzie River the explorer Richard McConnell noted that the Hudson Bay Company was using "tar springs" for pitch and observed bituminous limestone in the areas around Bear Rock and Fort Good Hope. But it was not until 1911 that an oil bearing formation was discovered. The first wells were drilled by Imperial Oil, now a major employer in the town, in 1919.

During the Second World War, Norman Wells was deemed important as a source of oil for military operations in Alaska and Yukon. The Canol Road and Canol Project was undertaken to enable the piping of oil to Whitehorse, with the flow starting in 1944. Although Norman Wells crude was light and easily flowed at temperatures as low as −62 °C (−80 °F), the line did not work well and was shut down shortly after the war ended. The road, which began at Canol Camp across the river, was abandoned. The road's remains now make up the Canol Heritage Trail in the NWT.

The Norman Wells Proven Area Agreement of 1944 is a partnership between Imperial Oil and the federal government (administered by Indigenous and Northern Affairs Canada) that has lasted to this day. The completion of an oil pipeline from Norman Wells to Zama City in 1985 connected to the North American pipeline grid and resulted in increased activity.

In January 2026 Imperial Oil announced it would be shutting down its operations in the third quarter of 2026, because of declining production combined with the low price of oil. Their operations employ about 80 people in Norman Wells, paying about $6 million in taxes, about 70% of the town's budget.

== Indigenous people ==
The Norman Wells Metis, a Métis group which is signatory to the Sahtu Dene and Metis Comprehensive Land Claim Agreement, are currently negotiating self-government powers and recently signed a framework agreement towards a new treaty.

== Transportation ==
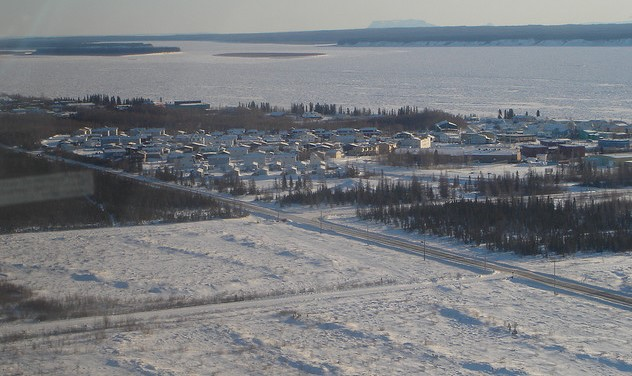
Norman Wells from the air

Norman Wells is accessible by navigating the Mackenzie River in summer, or by driving over the winter ice road, December to March, that connects with Wrigley and Fort Simpson. The most common method of travel into Norman Wells is by air via the Norman Wells Airport and the town is connected with both Yellowknife and Inuvik. Scheduled flights are provided by Canadian North and North-Wright Airways. Beginning in June 2010 and until its amalgamation with Canadian North, First Air offered a scheduled service into the community. In the summer floatplane access to the town is possible at the Norman Wells Water Aerodrome. During the summer months there are barge services, sealifts to the town by Marine Transportation Services from Hay River and Cooper Barging Services from Fort Simpson. Other aviation companies that have a presence in the community include Canadian Helicopters and Air Tindi.

== Services ==
Services include a three-member Royal Canadian Mounted Police detachment and a community health centre with two nurses with dental visits two or three times a year. There is a branch of the Canadian Imperial Bank of Commerce and two grocery stores including the Northern store and Rampart Rentals along with three hotels and two restaurants. Norman Wells also has a liquor store, currently the only one in the Sahtu Region. Phone service is provided by Northwestel with cable television and Internet access available. Mobile phone services are available through Bell Mobility or Northwestel's Latitude Wireless service, which is now owned by Bell. Former member of parliament for the Western Arctic, Ethel Blondin-Andrew, has a consulting service, Mountain Dene Ventures, in the town.

== Education ==
The community is part of the Sahtu Divisional Education Council and they operate, through the Norman Wells District Education Authority, the Mackenzie Mountain School. The school, which has an enrolment of 150, provides education from Junior Kindergarten to Grade 12. Aurora College has a presence in the community with a community learning centre and a career centre.

== Climate ==
Norman Wells has a subarctic climate (Köppen Dfc) with summer lasting for about three months. Although winter temperatures are usually below freezing, every month of the year has seen temperatures above 5 °C (41 °F). Rainfall averages 171.7 mm (6.76 in) and snowfall 161.5 cm (63.58 in). On average, there are 35.9 days between November and April, when the wind chill is equal to or below −40, which indicates that frostbite may occur within 5–10 minutes. Wind chills can drop below −48 indicating that frostbite can occur in less than 5 minutes.

On 8 July 2023, Norman Wells experienced its record high temperature of 37.9 °C (100.2 °F), which is the farthest north a temperature above 37.8 °C (100.0 °F) has been observed in Canada. The lowest recorded temperature was −54.4 °C (−65.9 °F) on 4 February 1947.

Climate data for Norman Wells (Norman Wells Airport) WMO ID: 71043; coordinates 65°16′53″N 126°47′55″W; elevation: 72.5 m (238 ft); 1991–2020 normals, extremes 1943–present
Month	Jan	Feb	Mar	Apr	May	Jun	Jul	Aug	Sep	Oct	Nov	Dec	Year
Record high humidex	12.2	6.3	17.5	20.0	29.7	36.2	37.2	36.0	29.7	19.8	12.2	10.7	37.2
Record high °C (°F)	12.5 (54.5)	7.9 (46.2)	17.8 (64.0)	20.0 (68.0)	31.3 (88.3)	33.5 (92.3)	37.9 (100.2)	34.8 (94.6)	28.7 (83.7)	21.0 (69.8)	13.3 (55.9)	11.1 (52.0)	37.9 (100.2)
Mean daily maximum °C (°F)	−21.4 (−6.5)	−18.0 (−0.4)	−12.0 (10.4)	0.9 (33.6)	13.0 (55.4)	21.0 (69.8)	22.6 (72.7)	19.1 (66.4)	11.3 (52.3)	−0.5 (31.1)	−13.6 (7.5)	−19.6 (−3.3)	0.2 (32.4)
Daily mean °C (°F)	−25.4 (−13.7)	−22.8 (−9.0)	−18.2 (−0.8)	−5.3 (22.5)	6.9 (44.4)	15.0 (59.0)	16.8 (62.2)	13.7 (56.7)	6.5 (43.7)	−3.9 (25.0)	−17.4 (0.7)	−23.6 (−10.5)	−4.8 (23.4)
Mean daily minimum °C (°F)	−29.4 (−20.9)	−27.5 (−17.5)	−24.3 (−11.7)	−11.5 (11.3)	0.8 (33.4)	8.8 (47.8)	10.9 (51.6)	8.2 (46.8)	1.5 (34.7)	−7.2 (19.0)	−21.2 (−6.2)	−27.5 (−17.5)	−9.9 (14.2)
Record low °C (°F)	−52.2 (−62.0)	−54.4 (−65.9)	−46.1 (−51.0)	−37.2 (−35.0)	−17.8 (0.0)	−4.3 (24.3)	−1.1 (30.0)	−6.1 (21.0)	−15.7 (3.7)	−31.7 (−25.1)	−42.8 (−45.0)	−47.8 (−54.0)	−54.4 (−65.9)
Record low wind chill	−61.7	−60.2	−57.5	−43.8	−25.1	−6.9	−2.2	−9.6	−17.7	−39.9	−52.4	−62.4	−62.4
Average precipitation mm (inches)	18.0 (0.71)	17.2 (0.68)	11.3 (0.44)	11.1 (0.44)	20.5 (0.81)	35.8 (1.41)	49.0 (1.93)	52.5 (2.07)	33.9 (1.33)	23.5 (0.93)	27.2 (1.07)	21.6 (0.85)	321.6 (12.66)
Average rainfall mm (inches)	0.2 (0.01)	0.0 (0.0)	0.4 (0.02)	1.3 (0.05)	11.6 (0.46)	35.7 (1.41)	46.4 (1.83)	49.1 (1.93)	23.9 (0.94)	3.3 (0.13)	0.1 (0.00)	0.0 (0.0)	171.9 (6.77)
Average snowfall cm (inches)	22.7 (8.9)	21.7 (8.5)	15.8 (6.2)	14.2 (5.6)	7.5 (3.0)	0.4 (0.2)	0.0 (0.0)	0.1 (0.0)	6.4 (2.5)	24.8 (9.8)	27.5 (10.8)	24.8 (9.8)	165.8 (65.3)
Average precipitation days (≥ 0.2 mm)	12.8	11.9	10.9	7.4	8.3	10.7	13.5	14.8	13.4	14.2	15.4	14.1	147.3
Average rainy days (≥ 0.2 mm)	0.17	0.04	0.21	0.92	4.8	9.6	12.0	12.1	9.9	2.5	0.22	0.0	52.4
Average snowy days (≥ 0.2 cm)	11.8	11.3	10.5	6.7	3.1	0.16	0.0	0.08	3.3	12.4	13.6	12.4	85.3
Average relative humidity (%) (at 1500 LST)	67.1	62.5	53.0	50.8	45.2	44.2	50.2	56.2	61.5	75.3	75.0	69.6	59.2
Source: Environment and Climate Change Canada (1991-2020 climate normals) (July Maximum temperature)

== See also ==
- List of municipalities in the Northwest Territories
