= 4th North-West Legislative Assembly =

4th North-West Assembly

Type
- Type: Unicameral

History
- Established: 1898
- Disbanded: 1902
- Preceded by: 3rd North-West Legislative Assembly
- Succeeded by: 5th North-West Legislative Assembly
- Seats: 30

Elections
- Last election: 1898

Meeting place
- Regina

The 4th North-West Legislative Assembly was the 6th meeting of the Northwest Territories Legislature. It lasted from 1898 to 1902. This was also the first new council after the creation of the Yukon from the extreme northwest portion of the territories on June 13, 1898.

== List of Members of the Legislative Assembly ==
4th North-West Legislative Assembly
District	Member	Party	First elected / previously elected	No. of terms
Banff	Robert Brett	Liberal	1888	4th term
Banff	Arthur Sifton (1901)	Liberal-Conservative	1901	1st term
Batoche	Charles Fisher	Independent	1898	1st term
Battleford	Joseph Benjamin Prince	Independent	1898	1st term
Cannington	Ewan McDiarmid	Independent	1898	1st term
East Calgary	Alfred Cross	Liberal-Conservative	1898	1st term
Edmonton	Matthew McCauley	Independent	1896	2nd term
Grenfell	Richard Stuart Lake	Liberal-Conservative	1898	1st term
High River	Richard Alfred Wallace	Independent	1898	1st term
Kinistino	William Frederick Meyers	Independent	1891	3rd term
Lethbridge	Leverett DeVeber	Independent	1898	1st term
Macleod	Frederick Haultain	Liberal-Conservative	1887	5th term
Medicine Hat	Horace Greeley	Independent	1898	1st term
Mitchell	Joseph McIntyre	Independent	1898	1st term
Moose Jaw	James Hamilton Ross	Liberal	1883	6th term
Moose Jaw	George Malcolm Annable (1901)	Liberal	1901	1st term
Moosomin	Alexander S. Smith	Independent	1898	1st term
North Qu'Appelle	Donald H. McDonald	Independent	1896	2nd term
North Regina	George W. Brown	Independent	1894	2nd term
Prince Albert East	Samuel McLeod	Independent	1898	1st term
Prince Albert West	Thomas McKay	Independent	1891, 1898	2nd term*
Red Deer	John A. Simpson	Independent	1894	2nd term
Saltcoats	William Eakin	Independent	1894	2nd term
Souris	John Connell	Independent	1898	1st term
South Qu'Appelle	George Bulyea	Liberal-Conservative	1894	2nd term
South Regina	James Hawkes	Independent	1898	1st term
St. Albert	Fredric Villeneuve	Independent	1898	1st term
Victoria	Jack Shera	Independent	1898	1st term
West Calgary	Richard Bennett	Independent	1898	1st term
Wetaskiwin	Anthony Rosenroll	Liberal-Conservative	1898	1st term
Whitewood	Archibald Gillis	Independent	1894	2nd term
Wolseley	William Elliott	Liberal-Conservative	1898	1st term
Yorkton	Thomas Alfred Patrick	Liberal-Conservative	1897	2nd term
