= 5th North-West Legislative Assembly =

Canadian legislative assembly

5th North-West Assembly

Type
- Type: Unicameral

History
- Established: 1902
- Disbanded: 1905
- Preceded by: 4th North-West Legislative Assembly
- Succeeded by: 2nd Council of the Northwest Territories
- Seats: 35

Elections
- Last election: 1902

Meeting place
- Regina

The 5th North-West Legislative Assembly lasted from 1902 until dissolution in 1905. This was the largest membership of any Assembly in the Northwest Territories of Canada, and the only one that truly had political parties. It was also the last one to be fully elected and have a speaker until 1975 and the last one to have a premier and executive council until 1980. It was dissolved due to the division of Alberta and Saskatchewan from the territories.

== Member changes after the election ==
Daniel Maloney, the member for St. Albert was unseated for bribery in 1903, and subsequently lost the by-election to fill the seat to Louis Joseph Alphonse Lambert by a vote of 363 to 332.

== List of Members of the Legislative Assembly ==
5th North-West Legislative Assembly
District	Member	Party	First elected / previously elected	No. of terms
Banff	Arthur Sifton	Liberal-Conservative	1901	2nd term
Banff	Charles W. Fisher (1903)	Liberal	1903	1st term
Batoche	Charles Fisher	Liberal	1898	2nd term
Battleford	Joseph Benjamin Prince	Liberal-Conservative	1898	2nd term
Cannington	Ewan McDiarmid	Independent Liberal	1898	2nd term
Cardston	John William Woolf	Liberal	1902	1st term
East Calgary	John Jackson Young	Independent	1902	1st term
Edmonton	Richard Secord	Independent	1902	1st term
Grenfell	Richard Stuart Lake	Liberal-Conservative	1898	2nd term
High River	Richard Alfred Wallace	Liberal-Conservative	1898	2nd term
Innisfail	John A. Simpson	Liberal-Conservative	1894	3rd term
Kinistino	William Frederick Meyers	Liberal	1891	4th term
Lacombe	Peter Talbot	Liberal-Conservative	1902	1st term
Lethbridge	Leverett DeVeber	Liberal-Conservative	1898	2nd term
Macleod	Frederick Haultain	Liberal-Conservative	1887	6th term
Maple Creek	Horace Greeley	Liberal-Conservative	1898	2nd term
Medicine Hat	William Finlay	Liberal-Conservative	1902	1st term
Mitchell	Alexander McIntyre	Liberal-Conservative	1902	1st term
Moose Jaw	George Annable	Liberal	1901	2nd term
Moosomin	Alexander S. Smith	Liberal-Conservative	1898	2nd term
North Qu'Appelle	Donald H. McDonald	Liberal	1896	3rd term
North Regina	George W. Brown	Liberal-Conservative	1894	3rd term
Prince Albert	Thomas McKay	Liberal	1891, 1898	3rd term*
Saltcoats	Thomas MacNutt	Liberal-Conservative	1902	1st term
Saskatoon	William Henry Sinclair	Liberal-Conservative	1902	1st term
Saskatoon	James Clinkskill	Liberal-Conservative	1888, (Note: Battleford) 1902	2nd term*
Souris	John Connell	Liberal-Conservative	1898	2nd term
South Qu'Appelle	George Bulyea	Liberal-Conservative	1894	3rd term
South Regina	James Hawkes	Independent	1898	2nd term
Strathcona	Alexander Rutherford	Liberal-Conservative	1902	1st term
St. Albert	Daniel Maloney	Independent	1894, 1902	2nd term*
St. Albert	Louis Joseph Alphonse Lambert (1903)	Independent	1903	1st term
Victoria	Jack Shera	Independent	1898	2nd term
West Calgary	Richard Bennett	Independent	1898	2nd term
Wetaskiwin	Anthony Rosenroll	Liberal-Conservative	1898	2nd term
Whitewood	Archibald Gillis	Liberal-Conservative	1894	3rd term
Wolseley	William Elliott	Liberal-Conservative	1898	2nd term
Yorkton	Thomas Alfred Patrick	Liberal	1897	3rd term
