= 1898 North-West Territories general election =

- 4 November 1898

31 seats in the North-West Legislative Assembly
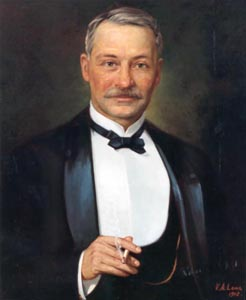

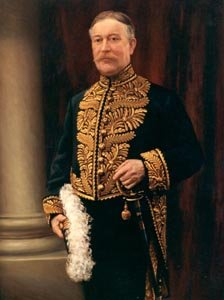
	First party	Second party
Leader	Frederick W. A. G. Haultain	Robert Brett
Party	Liberal-Conservative	Liberal
Leader since	1897	1897
Leader's seat	Macleod	Banff
Seats won	7	2
Premier before election
Frederick W. A. G. Haultain
Liberal-Conservative
Premier after election
Frederick W. A. G. Haultain
Liberal-Conservative

The 1898 North-West Territories general election took place on 4 November 1898. This was the fourth general election in the history of the North-West Territories, Canada. It was held to elect members of the Legislative Assembly of the North-West Territories. In 1897 Responsible Government had been secured, and this was the first election where voters elected an assembly that would control the executive members that would conduct the business of the NWT government.

Frederick W. A. G. Haultain was still the first premier of the North-West Territories (NWT). That title was given by legislation passed in 1897. He was the last premier of the NWT until 1980.

There were three big issues in this election. One was acquiring provincial rights and how to divide the NWT into provinces.

The second issue was the transfer of education from the federal to the territorial level. This was Haultain's personal project. It was achieved for some of the NWT residents by the creation of the provinces of Alberta and Saskatchewan. Unfortunately for the rest of the NWT, that power was not turned over to the Territorial Assembly until 1970, long after Haultain's passing.

The third issue was the territory's budget deficit and growing debt. The territory was facing pressure from a rapidly increasing population in all parts of the territory. Earlier in 1898 the territorial government tried to get the liquor revenue in the Klondike, since it was footing the bill for increased services and policing. The federal government however blocked that project by carving the Yukon Territory out of the NWT and appointing a council loyal to the federal government.

The 1898 election was the first general election in which the election was contested along party lines in the NWT. Frederick W. A. G. Haultain sustained the governing North-West Territories Liberal-Conservative Party in coalition with James Hamilton Ross, who was a member of the Hautain cabinet but a Liberal member. Robert Brett remained leader of the official opposition. Their use was controversial. A Calgary Herald editorial in the 17 November 1898 Weekly edition debated the pros and cons of bringing "Dominion party lines" to the territorial legislature.

== Election results ==
=== Members of the Legislative Assembly elected ===
For complete electoral history, see individual districts

Electoral District	First	Second	Third	Fourth	Fifth	Incumbent
Banff	Robert Brett; 181; 50.28%	Arthur Sifton; 179; 49.72%				Robert Brett
Batoche	Charles Fisher; 76; 58.46%	Charles Eugene Boucher; 54; 41.54%				Charles Eugene Boucher
Battleford	Joseph Benjamin Prince; 185; 58.54%	James M. Skelton; 131; 41.46%				James Clinkskill
Cannington	Ewan Cameron McDiarmid; 228; 52.66%	Samuel Page; 114; 26.33%	William Hislop; 91; 21.02%			Samuel Page
East Calgary	Alfred Ernest Cross; 182; 33.21%	Simon John Clarke; 127; 23.18%	James Reilly; 120; 21.90%	Joseph Bannerman; 119; 21.72%		Joseph Bannerman
Edmonton	Matthew McCauley; 582; 48.83%	Alexander Cameron Rutherford; 498; 41.78%	Harry Havelock Robertson; 112; 9.40%			Frank Oliver
Grenfell	Richard Stuart Lake; 351; 69.64%	Benjamin Parkyn Richardson; 153; 30.36%				
High River	Richard Alfred Wallace; 176; 38.51%	Albert Edward Banister; 126; 27.57%	Walter C. Skrine; 114; 24.95%	Alfred Wyndham; 37; 8.1%	Alexander Begg; 4; 0.88%	John Lineham
Kinistino	William Frederick Meyers; 98; 65.77%	Thomas Sanderson; 51; 34.23%				William Frederick Meyers
Lethbridge	Leverett George DeVeber; Acclamation					Charles Alexander Magrath
Macleod	Frederick W. A. G. Haultain; Acclamation					Frederick W. A. G. Haultain
Medicine Hat	Horace Greeley; 327; 36.50%	William Finlay; 285; 31.81%	John George Calder; 284; 31.70%			Edward Fearon
Mitchell	Joseph Albert McIntyre; 200; 51.68%	Archibald Blyth Stewart; 187; 48.32%				Hilliard Mitchell
Moose Jaw	James Hamilton Ross; Acclamation					James Hamilton Ross
Moosomin	Alexander S. Smith; 614; 61.03%	John Ryerson Neff; 392; 38.97%				John Ryerson Neff
North Qu’Appelle	Donald H. McDonald; Acclamation					William Sutherland
North Regina	George W. Brown; 436; 68.55%	John Henry Charles Willoughby; 200; 31.45%				George W. Brown
Prince Albert East	Samuel McLeod; 315; 53.03%	John Felton Betts; 279; 46.97%				John Felton Betts
Prince Albert West	Thomas McKay; 237; 55.50%	Thomas James Agnew; 190; 44.50%				John Lestock Reid
Red Deer	John A. Simpson; 349; 46.10%	George Wellington Greene; 253; 33.42%	James Speakman; 155; 20.48%			John A. Simpson
St. Albert	Fredric Edmond Villeneuve; 429; 53.56%	Daniel Maloney; 292; 36.45%	G.W. Gardiner; 80; 9.99%			Daniel Maloney
Saltcoats	William Eakin; 215; 51.44%	James Nixon; 203; 48.56%				William Eakin
Souris	John Wesley Connell; 424; 56.16%	John Young; 331; 43.84%				George Knowling
South Qu’Appelle	George H. V. Bulyea; 403; 55.21%	William G. Vickers; 327; 44.79%				George H. V. Bulyea
South Regina	James B. Hawkes; 273; 51.03%	Jacob W. Smith; 210; 39.25%	William F. Eddy; 52; 9.72%			Daniel Mowat
Victoria	Jack Shera; 242; 52.27%	Frank Fraser Tims; 221; 47.73%				Frank Fraser Tims
West Calgary	R. B. Bennett; 291; 40.87%	William W. Stuart; 205; 28.79%	James Muir; 169; 23.74%	Thomas Riley; 47; 6.60%		Oswald Critchley
Wetaskiwin	Anthony Rosenroll; Acclamation					
Whitewood	Archibald Beaton Gillis; Acclamation					Archibald Beaton Gillis
Wolseley	William Elliott; 317; 54.56%	Levi Thomson; 264; 45.44%				James Dill
Yorkton	Thomas Alfred Patrick; Acclamation					Thomas Alfred Patrick

- Robert Brett (Banff) was elected in a contentiously close election, however the results were challenged by opponent Arthur Sifton, who won the subsequent by-election.

== See also ==
- List of Northwest Territories general elections
