= 1902 North-West Territories general election =

← 1898	21 May 1902	1905 (AB) → 1905 (SK) →

35 seats in the North-West Legislative Assembly 18 seats were needed for a majority
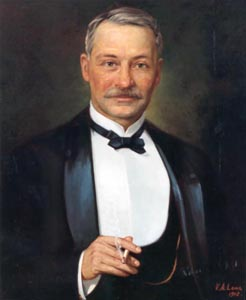
	Majority party	Minority party
		LIB
Leader	Frederick W. A. G. Haultain	Donald H. McDonald
Party	Liberal-Conservative	Liberal
Leader since	1897	1902
Leader's seat	Macleod	North Qu'Appelle
Last election	7	2
Seats won	21	7
Popular vote	8,319	5,067
Percentage	47.8%	29.1%
Premier before election
Frederick W. A. G. Haultain
Liberal-Conservative
Premier after election
Frederick W. A. G. Haultain
Liberal-Conservative

The 1902 North-West Territories general election, occurred on 21 May 1902 and was the fifth general election in the history of the North-West Territories, Canada. It was held to elect 35 Members of the Legislative Assembly of the North-West Territories.

The Liberal-Conservatives led by incumbent North-West Territories Premier Frederick W. A. G. Haultain, received 8,319 votes, taking 21 of 35 seats. The North-West Territories Liberal Party under the leadership of Donald H. McDonaldr received 5,067 votes, and received 7 seats in the Legislative Assembly.

The main issue of the 1902 election was provincial autonomy for the North-West Territories. Political leaders across the North-West Territories had been pushing the federal Laurier Liberal government for provincial status for the Territories since 1896. Support for provincial autonomy was largely unanimous amongst all candidates, and most ran largely on a platform focused on the issue.

Candidates in this election were not nominated by the party in a contested nomination as with modern elections, but rather proclaimed their support for the governing party or opposition party, or Independent. During the election race some candidates shifted their alignment. The result was a confusing mess, and the bulk of candidates proclaimed support for the already governing Liberal-Conservative party, leaving the Liberals without candidates in many districts. Lethbridge ended up being contested by two government supporting candidates.

Three years after the 1902 election, the provinces of Alberta and Saskatchewan were carved out of North-West Territories in 1905, and they took most of the voting population with them. The 1902 election was the last election held in the NWT until 1951, and it elected the last assembly in the Northwest Territories (NWT) to use political parties. After 1905, the NWT government reverted to an appointed consensus model of government. Since 1951, the government of NWT has been of the elected consensus model of government.

1902 would also see the largest number of MLAs elected to the North-West Territories Legislature in the territories' history.

== Election summary ==
Party	Party Leader	# of candidates	Elected	Popular Vote	
Party	Party Leader	# of candidates	Elected	#	%
Liberal-Conservative	Frederick Haultain	32	21	8,319	47.70%
Liberal	Donald H. McDonald	21	7	5,067	29.06%
Independent		11	6	3,381	19.39%
Independent Liberal		1	1	362	2.07%
Independent Liberal-Conservative		1	-	310	1.78%
Total		66	35	17,439	100%

Note:

- Sources are conflicted about the affiliation of some candidates, vote counts and total number of candidates are accurate, standings and votes by party may change upon further research.

== Members of the Legislative Assembly elected ==
For complete electoral history, see individual districts

5th North-West Legislative Assembly
District	Member	Party
Banff	Arthur Sifton	Liberal-Conservative
Batoche	Charles Fisher	Liberal
Battleford	Joseph Benjamin Prince	Liberal-Conservative
Cannington	Ewan McDiarmid	Independent Liberal
Cardston	John William Woolf	Liberal
East Calgary	John Jackson Young	Independent
Edmonton	Richard Secord	Independent
Grenfell	Richard Stuart Lake	Liberal-Conservative
High River	Richard Alfred Wallace	Liberal-Conservative
Innisfail	John A. Simpson	Liberal-Conservative
Kinistino	William Frederick Meyers	Liberal
Lacombe	Peter Talbot	Liberal-Conservative
Lethbridge	Leverett DeVeber	Liberal-Conservative
Macleod	Frederick Haultain	Liberal-Conservative
Maple Creek	Horace Greeley	Liberal-Conservative
Medicine Hat	William Finlay	Liberal-Conservative
Mitchell	Alexander McIntyre	Liberal-Conservative
Moose Jaw	George Annable	Liberal
Moosomin	Alexander S. Smith	Liberal-Conservative
North Qu'Appelle	Donald H. McDonald	Liberal
North Regina	George W. Brown	Liberal-Conservative
Prince Albert	Thomas McKay	Liberal
Saltcoats	Thomas MacNutt	Liberal-Conservative
Saskatoon	William Henry Sinclair	Liberal-Conservative
Souris	John Connell	Liberal-Conservative
South Qu'Appelle	George Bulyea	Liberal-Conservative
South Regina	James Hawkes	Independent
Strathcona	Alexander Rutherford	Liberal-Conservative
St. Albert	Daniel Maloney	Independent
Victoria	Jack Shera	Independent
West Calgary	Richard Bennett^{*}	Independent
Wetaskiwin	Anthony Rosenroll	Liberal-Conservative
Whitewood	Archibald Gillis	Liberal-Conservative
Wolseley	William Elliott	Liberal-Conservative
Yorkton	Thomas Alfred Patrick	Liberal

Note: ^{*} Sources are conflicted on Richard Bennett as to whether he was a Liberal or Independent

== See also ==
- 1905 Alberta general election
- 1905 Saskatchewan general election
- List of Northwest Territories general elections
- 2nd Council of the Northwest Territories
