= Banff (territorial electoral district) =

Former territorial electoral district in the North-West Territories, Canada

Northwest Territories electoral district

Defunct territorial electoral district
- Legislature: Legislative Assembly of the Northwest Territories
- District created: 1891
- District abolished: 1905
- First contested: 1891
- Last contested: 1902

Banff was a territorial electoral district that was mandated to return a single member to the North-West Legislative Assembly from 1891 until Alberta became a province in 1905.

== Geography ==
The electoral district was named for Banff, covering the Alberta portion of the Rocky Mountains and foothills west of Calgary.

== Members of the Legislative Assembly (MLAs) ==
Members of the Legislative Assembly for Banff
Assembly	Years	Member|	Party
See Calgary 1884-1891
2nd	1891–1894	Robert Brett	Independent
3rd	1894–1898	Robert Brett	Independent
4th	1898–1899	Robert Brett	Liberal
4th	1899-1902	Arthur Sifton	Liberal-Conservative
5th	1902–1903	Arthur Sifton	Liberal-Conservative
5th	1903	Vacant	
5th	1903-1905	Charles Fisher	Liberal
See Banff (Alberta) 1905–1940

Banff's first representative was physician Robert Brett, who had already served one term as MLA for Red Deer, and served two full terms in Banff. There were no official parties in these early assemblies, but Brett aligned himself with the North-West Territories Liberal Party when the Dominion party lines were introduced in 1898.

In the 1898 election, Brett appeared to have held his seat against challenger Arthur Sifton, but Sifton challenged the results in court and proceeded to win the ensuing by-election. In 1902, he easily defended his seat.

When Sifton was appointed as a judge in early 1903, another by-election was held in Banff, this time won by Liberal candidate Charles Fisher. In 1905 when Alberta became a province, Fisher ran in the new Banff district and defeated previous MLA Robert Brett (now running as a Conservative) to retain the seat.

== Election results ==
=== Elections in the 1890s ===
1891 North-West Territories general election
Party	Candidate	Votes
Independent	Robert George Brett	Acclaimed
Total valid votes		0
Source(s) "North-West Territories: Council and Legislative Assembly, 1876-1905" (PDF). Saskatchewan Archives. Archived from the original (PDF) on September 28, 2007.

1894 North-West Territories general election
Party	Candidate	Votes	%
Independent	Robert George Brett	238	64.15
Independent	T. F. English	133	35.85
Total valid votes		371	100.00
Source(s) "North-West Territories: Council and Legislative Assembly, 1876-1905" (PDF). Saskatchewan Archives. Archived from the original (PDF) on September 28, 2007.

1898 North-West Territories general election
Party	Candidate	Votes	%	±%
Liberal	Robert George Brett	181	50.28	−13.87
Liberal–Conservative	Arthur Lewis Sifton	179	49.72	
Total valid votes		360	100.00	
Liberal hold		Swing		−13.87
Source(s) "North-West Territories: Council and Legislative Assembly, 1876-1905" (PDF). Saskatchewan Archives. Archived from the original (PDF) on September 28, 2007.

North-West Territories territorial by-election, June 27, 1899 Upon the invalidation of the 1898 result
Party	Candidate	Votes	%	±%
Liberal–Conservative	Arthur Lewis Sifton	193	54.83	+5.11
Liberal	Robert George Brett	159	45.17	−5.11
Total valid votes		352	100.00	
Liberal–Conservative gain from Liberal		Swing		+5.11
Source(s) "North-West Territories: Council and Legislative Assembly, 1876-1905" (PDF). Saskatchewan Archives. Archived from the original (PDF) on September 28, 2007.

=== Elections in the 1900s ===
North-West Territories territorial by-election, March 22, 1901 Upon the appointment of Arthur Lewis Sifton to the territorial cabinet
Party	Candidate	Votes	
Liberal–Conservative	Arthur Lewis Sifton	Acclaimed	
Total valid votes		0	
Liberal–Conservative hold		Swing	N/A
Source(s) "North-West Territories: Council and Legislative Assembly, 1876-1905" (PDF). Saskatchewan Archives. Archived from the original (PDF) on September 28, 2007.

1902 North-West Territories general election
Party	Candidate	Votes	%	±%
Liberal–Conservative	Arthur Lewis Sifton	296	81.32	+26.49
Liberal	Robert Smith	68	18.68	
Total valid votes		364	100.00	
Liberal–Conservative hold		Swing		+26.49
Source(s) "North-West Territories: Council and Legislative Assembly, 1876-1905" (PDF). Saskatchewan Archives. Archived from the original (PDF) on September 28, 2007.

North-West Territories territorial by-election, February 4, 1903 Upon the resignation of Arthur Lewis Sifton
Party	Candidate	Votes	%	±%
Liberal	Charles Wellington Fisher	263	57.67	+38.99
Liberal–Conservative	H.J. Richardson	193	42.33	-38.99
Total valid votes		456	100.00	
Liberal gain from Liberal–Conservative		Swing		+38.99
Source(s) "North-West Territories: Council and Legislative Assembly, 1876-1905" (PDF). Saskatchewan Archives. Archived from the original (PDF) on September 28, 2007.

== See also ==
- List of Northwest Territories territorial electoral districts
- Canadian provincial electoral districts
