= Red Deer (territorial electoral district) =

Former territorial electoral district in the North-West Territories, Canada

Northwest Territories electoral district

Defunct territorial electoral district
- Legislature: Legislative Assembly of the Northwest Territories
- District created: 1888
- District abolished: 1902
- First contested: 1888
- Last contested: 1898

Red Deer was a territorial electoral district that was mandated to return a single member to the North-West Legislative Assembly from 1888 until 1902.

== Geography ==
The electoral district was named for Red Deer, a community which was incorporated as a village in 1894 and town in 1901.

== Members of the Legislative Assembly (MLAs) ==
Members of the Legislative Assembly for Red Deer
Assembly	Years	Member	Party
1st	1888–1891	Robert Brett	Independent
2nd	1891–1894	Francis Wilkins	Independent
3rd	1894–1898	John A. Simpson	Independent
4th	1898–1902	John A. Simpson	Independent

Red Deer's first representative was physician Robert Brett. There were no official parties in these early assemblies, but Brett aligned himself with the North-West Territories Liberal Party when the Dominion party lines were introduced in 1898.

In the 1891 election, Brett contested the Banff electoral district and Francis Wilkins was acclaimed as the member for Red Deer. In the 1894 election, Wilkins came in third to the elected John A. Simpson and behind Leonard Gaetz. Simpson held the seat in the 1898 election, defeating George Wellington Greene and J. Speakman.

== Election results ==
1888 North-West Territories general election
Party	Candidate	Votes	%
Independent	Robert George Brett	325	60.98
Independent	Alfred Brealey	208	39.02
Total valid votes		538	100.00

1891 North-West Territories general election
Party	Candidate	Votes
Francis Edward Wilkins	Acclaimed	
Total valid votes		0

1894 North-West Territories general election
Party	Candidate	Votes	%
John A. Simpson	282	37.55	
Leonard Gaetz	257	34.22	
Francis Edward Wilkins	212	28.23	
Total valid votes		751	100.00

1898 North-West Territories general election
Party	Candidate	Votes	%
John A. Simpson	349	46.10	
George Wellington Greene	253	33.42	
J. Speakman	155	20.48	
Total valid votes		757	100.00

== See also ==
- List of Northwest Territories territorial electoral districts
- Canadian provincial electoral districts
