= Province of Buffalo =

Proposed Canadian province in the 20th century

Coordinates: 55.362°N 110.046°W

The Province of Buffalo was a proposal for the creation of a new Canadian province in the early 20th century. Its main proponent was Sir Frederick Haultain, the premier of the North-West Territories.

However, Haultain's frosty relations with Canadian prime minister Sir Wilfrid Laurier did not help his cause, and in 1905, his proposed province was divided into Alberta in the west and Saskatchewan in the east.

== History ==
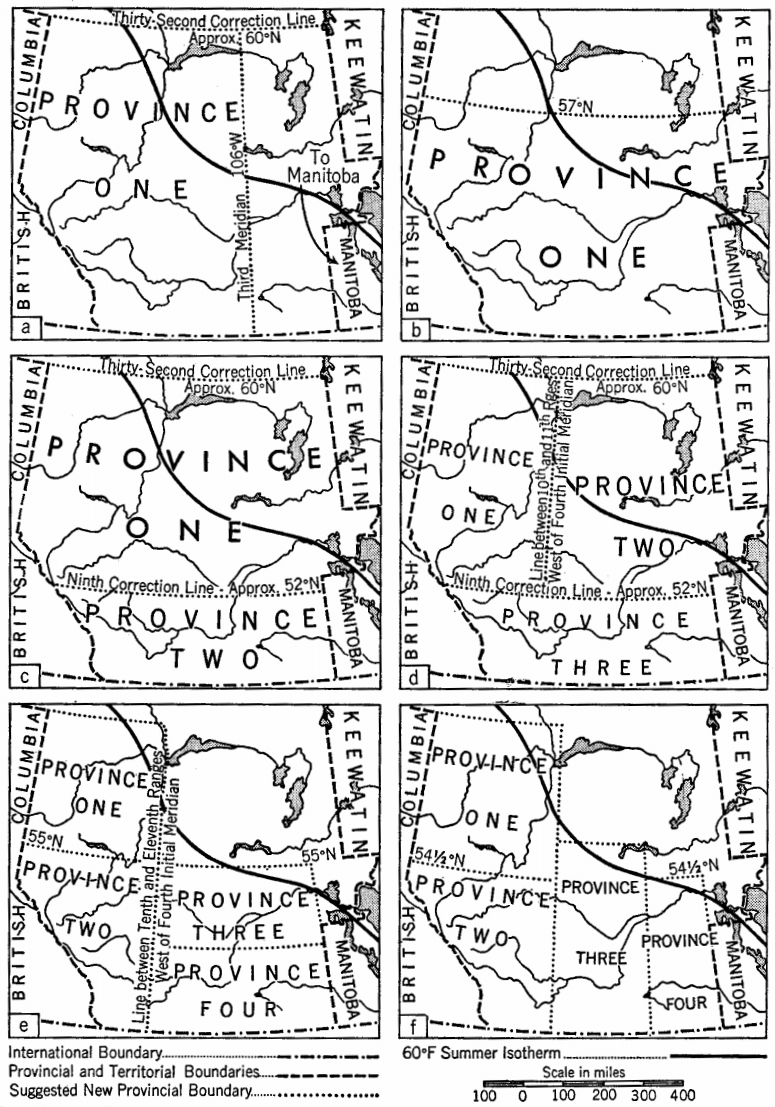
Divisions considered by the federal government to divide Western Canada.

The Province of Buffalo was one of several proposals for the area of what would become Alberta and Saskatchewan. Haultain proposed the idea in 1904, stating that "One big province would be able to do things no other province could." At the time many Calgarians and Edmontonians disagreed with the proposal, since Haultain thought the capital of the new province should be Regina, with him as its first premier, but Edmonton and Calgary each had their own ambitions to be a capital city (Edmonton eventually becoming the capital of Alberta).

Laurier eventually carved two provinces out of that section of the North-West Territories by dividing the land up with a north–south line at the 110 longitude. This created Alberta in the west, and Saskatchewan in the east. This dividing line was about where Yorkton NWT member Thomas Alfred Patrick had envisioned it.

In 2005 Canadian Geographic magazine ran a cover story, "How the West was divided", on Haultain's proposal.
