= Lacombe (territorial electoral district) =

Former territorial electoral district in the North-West Territories, Canada

Northwest Territories electoral district

Defunct territorial electoral district
- Legislature: Legislative Assembly of the Northwest Territories
- District created: 1902
- District abolished: 1905
- First contested: 1902
- Last contested: 1902

Lacombe was a territorial electoral district for the Legislative Assembly of the North-West Territories, Canada. The riding was only contested once, in 1902, prior to the formation of the Province of Alberta in 1905.

== Members of the Legislative Assembly (MLAs) ==
Peter Talbot served from 1902 to 1905, being the district's only representative.

== Election results ==
=== 1902 election ===
1902 North-West Territories general election: Lacombe
Party	Candidate	Votes	%
Liberal–Conservative	Peter Talbot	556	63.83
-	John Thomas Moore	315	36.17
Total valid votes		871	100.00

== See also ==
- List of Northwest Territories territorial electoral districts
- Canadian provincial electoral districts
- Lacombe Alberta provincial electoral district.
