= Strathcona (territorial electoral district) =

Former territorial electoral district in the North-West Territories, Canada

Strathcona was a territorial electoral district in the North-West Territories from 1902 to 1905. In 1905, the province of Alberta was split from the North-West Territories. The provincial district of Strathcona carried on from the old territorial district. It became Edmonton-South in 1913, then was abolished in 1921 when Edmonton started to elect its MLAs in one city-wide district (through block voting, then the single transferable vote). The "Strathcona" name was reborn in 1959 when Edmonton reverted to electing its MLAs in single-member districts (through first-past-the-post voting). Under the name Edmonton-Strathcona, it exists to the present day.

== 1902 election results ==
1902 North-West Territories general election
Party	Candidate	Votes	%
Liberal–Conservative	Alexander Rutherford	577	89.46%
Independent	N.D. Mills	68	10.54%
Source(s) Source: "Territories" (PDF). Saskatchewan Archives Board. Archived from the original (PDF) on 28 September 2007.

== See also ==
- List of Northwest Territories territorial electoral districts
- Canadian provincial electoral districts
- Strathcona Alberta provincial electoral district
- Strathcona Federal electoral district
