= Arthur Sifton =

Premier of Alberta from 1910 to 1917

The Right Honourable Arthur Sifton PC KC
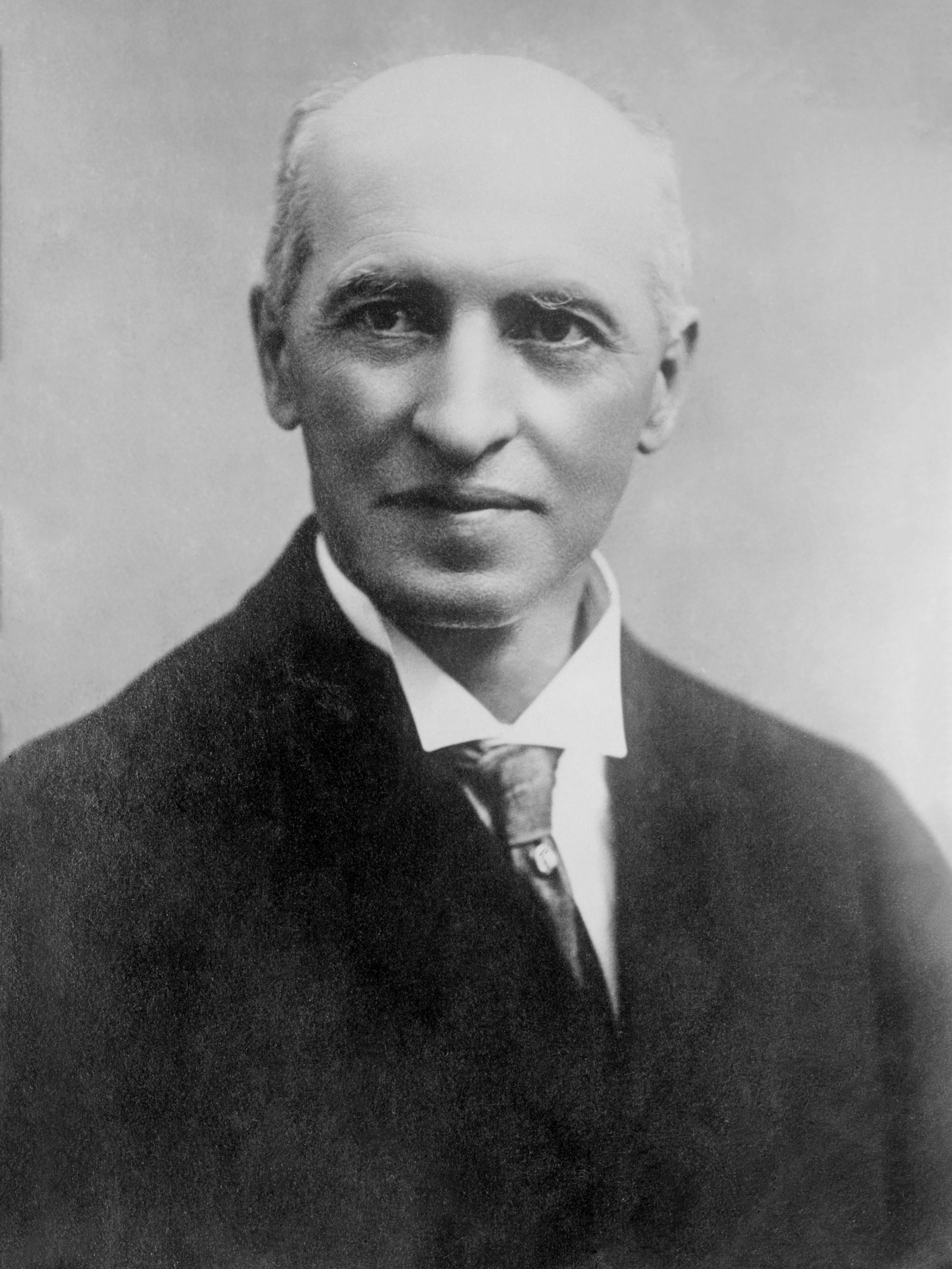

2nd Premier of Alberta
- In office May 26, 1910 – October 30, 1917
- Monarch: George V
- Lieutenant Governor: George H. V. Bulyea; Robert Brett
- Preceded by: Alexander Cameron Rutherford
- Succeeded by: Charles Stewart

Treasurer of Alberta
- In office March 26, 1913 – November 28, 1913
- Preceded by: Malcolm McKenzie
- Succeeded by: Charles R. Mitchell
- In office June 1, 1910 – May 4, 1912
- Preceded by: Alexander Cameron Rutherford
- Succeeded by: Malcolm McKenzie

Alberta Minister of Railways and Telephones
- In office December 20, 1912 – October 30, 1917
- Preceded by: Alexander Cameron Rutherford^{1}
- Succeeded by: Charles Stewart

Alberta Minister of Public Works
- In office June 1, 1910 – May 4, 1912
- Preceded by: William Henry Cushing
- Succeeded by: Charles R. Mitchell

Secretary of State for Canada
- In office December 31, 1919 – January 21, 1921
- Prime Minister: Robert Borden; Arthur Meighen
- Preceded by: Martin Burrell
- Succeeded by: Henry Lumley Drayton

Canadian Minister of Public Works
- In office September 3, 1919 – December 30, 1919
- Prime Minister: Robert Borden
- Preceded by: John Dowsley Reid
- Succeeded by: John Dowsley Reid

Canadian Minister of Customs and Inland Revenue
- In office May 14, 1918 – September 1, 1919
- Prime Minister: Robert Borden
- Preceded by: Albert Sévigny (as Minister of Inland Revenue); Continuing (as Minister of Customs)
- Succeeded by: John Dowsley Reid

Canadian Minister of Customs
- In office October 12, 1917 – May 14, 1918
- Prime Minister: Robert Borden
- Preceded by: John Dowsley Reid
- Succeeded by: Continuing

Northwest Territories Treasurer
- In office March 1, 1901 – January 14, 1903
- Preceded by: James Hamilton Ross
- Succeeded by: Frederick Haultain

Northwest Territories Minister of Public Works
- In office March 1, 1901 – January 14, 1903
- Preceded by: James Hamilton Ross
- Succeeded by: George Bulyea

Member of the Canadian Parliament for Medicine Hat
- In office December 17, 1917 – January 21, 1921
- Preceded by: William Ashbury Buchanan
- Succeeded by: Robert Gardiner

Member of the Alberta Legislative Assembly for Vermilion
- In office June 29, 1910 – October 12, 1917
- Preceded by: Archibald Campbell
- Succeeded by: Arthur Ebbett

Member of the Northwest Territories Legislative Assembly for Banff
- In office June 27, 1899 – January 1903
- Preceded by: Robert Brett
- Succeeded by: Charles Wellington Fisher

Member of the Brandon City Council
- In office 1882–1884

Personal details
- Born: Arthur Lewis Watkins Sifton; October 26, 1858 Middlesex County, Canada West
- Died: January 21, 1921 (aged 62) Ottawa, Ontario, Canada
- Party: Alberta Liberal (1910–1917)
- Other political affiliations: Liberal-Conservative (1902–1903); Unionist Party (1917–1921)
- Spouse: Mary H. Deering
- Children: 2
- Education: University of Toronto
- ^{1 Rutherford served as Minister of Railways until June 1, 1910, after which the position was vacant until Sifton took it. Minister of Telephones was a new position.}

Arthur Lewis Watkins Sifton PC KC (October 26, 1858 – January 21, 1921) was a Canadian lawyer, judge and politician who served as the second premier of Alberta from 1910 until 1917. He became a minister in the federal cabinet of Canada thereafter. Born in Canada West (now Ontario), he grew up there and in Winnipeg, where he became a lawyer. He subsequently practised law with his brother Clifford Sifton in Brandon, where he was also active in municipal politics. He moved west to Prince Albert in 1885 and to Calgary in 1889. There, he was elected to the 4th and 5th North-West Legislative Assemblies; he served as a minister in the government of premier Frederick Haultain. In 1903, the federal government, at the instigation of his brother (who was then one of its ministers), made Sifton the Chief Justice of the Northwest Territories. After Alberta was created out of a portion of the Northwest Territories in 1905, Sifton became the first Chief Justice of Alberta in 1907 and served until 1910.

In 1910, the Liberal government of Alberta premier Alexander Cameron Rutherford was embroiled in the Alberta and Great Waterways Railway scandal. The Lieutenant Governor of Alberta, George Bulyea, was a Liberal and determined that for the sake of the Alberta Liberal Party, Rutherford had to be pushed aside in favour of a new premier. When other prominent Liberals declined it, the position was offered to Sifton, who accepted it. As premier, Sifton smoothed over the divisions in the party that had caused and been exacerbated by the railway scandal. He made attempts to break with the Rutherford railway policy; when these were rebuffed by the courts, he adopted a course similar to Rutherford's. He unsuccessfully pursued the transfer of rights over Alberta's natural resources from the federal government, which had retained them by the terms of Alberta's provincehood.

While Sifton was premier, the United Farmers of Alberta rose as a political force. Sifton tried to accommodate many of their demands: his government constructed agricultural colleges, incorporated a farmer-run grain elevator cooperative, and implemented a municipal system of hail insurance. Outside of agriculture, the UFA was instrumental in the Sifton government's implementation of some direct democracy measures (which resulted in prohibition) and the extension of the vote to women.

During the conscription crisis of 1917, Sifton supported the Conservative prime minister, Sir Robert Borden, in his attempt to impose conscription to help win the First World War. He backed the creation of a federal Union government composed of Conservatives and pro-conscription Liberals. In 1917, he left provincial politics and became a cabinet minister in the Union government. Over the next three and a half years, he served briefly in four different ministries and was a delegate to the Paris Peace Conference of 1919. He died in Ottawa in January 1921 after a brief illness.

== Early life ==
Arthur Sifton was born on October 26, 1858, in Arva, Canada West (now Ontario), to John Wright Sifton and Catherine "Kate" Watkins. He was the older brother of politician Clifford Sifton. He attended public schools across southern Ontario, culminating with a boys' school in Dundas and high school in London. His father was a devout Methodist and a staunch Reformer and, later, Liberal. These allegiances permeated his home life; the Sifton household was often visited by clergy, laity, businessmen, lawyers, and politicians. In 1874 or 1875, John Sifton won contracts for preliminary construction work on the Canadian Pacific Railway (CPR) and moved the family to Winnipeg, where Arthur completed high school at Wesley College. Following his graduation, he and Clifford attended Victoria College, then located in Cobourg, Ontario. In 1880, he graduated with a Bachelor of Arts. While in Cobourg, he was not a devoted student: he skipped many classes, and was judged by his classmates to be "intellectually, morally, physically and erratically preeminent in virtue and otherwise, especially otherwise".

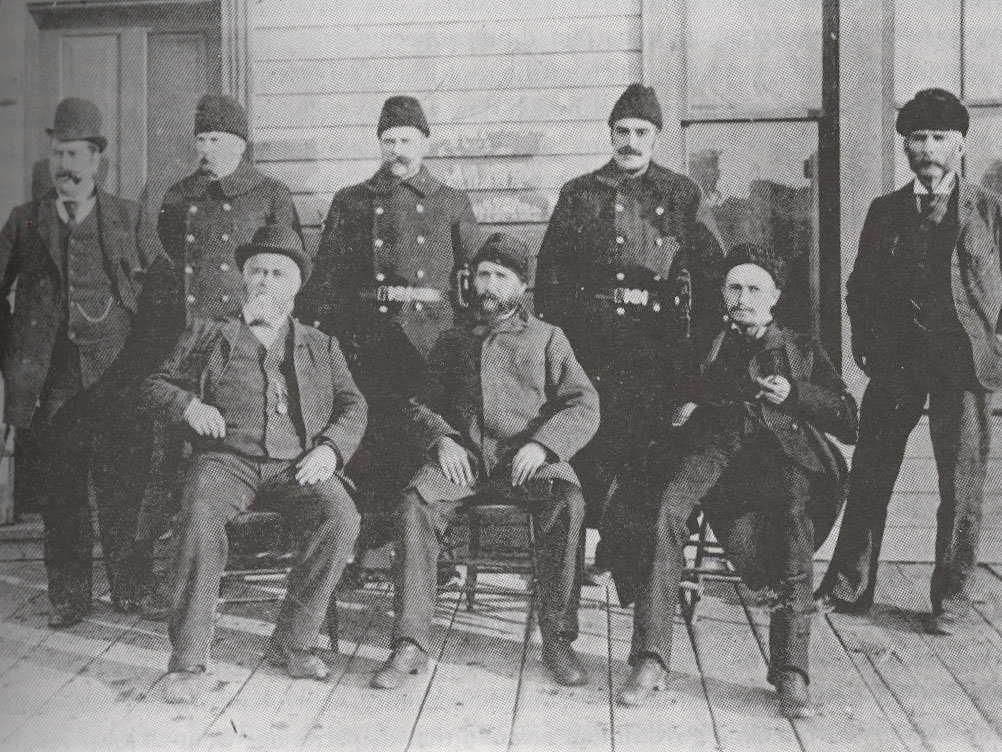
Sifton, front row right, as Calgary's city solicitor, 1892

Upon graduation, Arthur Sifton returned to Winnipeg to article with Albert Monkman until 1881, when he followed his father to Brandon. John hoped to take advantage of a local real estate boom; nominally, Arthur was running a Brandon branch of Monkman's law firm, though he had not yet finished his articling and was accordingly unqualified to practise law. On September 20, 1882, he married Mary Deering of Cobourg; the pair had two children, Nellie Louise Sifton (born August 1883) and Lewis Raymond St Clair Sifton (born February 1898). In 1883, he wrote and passed his bar exam and joined Clifford's Brandon law firm, now styled Sifton and Sifton.

University of Alberta historian David Hall describes the next phase of Sifton's life as "shrouded in mystery". For reasons that are not clear, in 1885 Sifton dissolved his partnership with his brother and moved his family to Prince Albert. (Hall speculates that the brothers had a falling out, but notes that their later working relationship appears to have been amicable.) In 1885, Prince Albert's prospects did not appear bright, as it had been bypassed by the CPR line. Regardless, Sifton practised law and was in 1885 made a notary public. Three years later, he earned a Master of Arts from Victoria College and a Bachelor of Laws from the University of Toronto. In 1889, he relocated again, to Calgary; there is some suggestion that this move was for the sake of his wife's health. There he opened a law office, worked in the office of the city solicitor, and became a partner in the firm of Sifton, Short, and Stuart. At one point he was a crown prosecutor. In 1892, he was appointed Queen's Counsel.

=== Early political career ===
Sifton's first foray into politics was in 1878, when he campaigned for the introduction of prohibition under the auspices of the Canada Temperance Act in the Manitoba electoral districts of Lisgar and Marquette. His first bid for elected office took place in 1882, when he was elected to Brandon's first city council. He was re-elected in 1883, and did not seek re-election at the conclusion of this second term, though he did briefly consider running for mayor before concluding that he had insufficient support to be elected. He also served on the local school board. When his brother Clifford became Wilfrid Laurier's Minister of the Interior in November 1896, Sifton advised him on Liberal Party affairs in western Canada. This advice included suggested patronage appointments, one of which was an unimplemented proposal that Arthur himself be appointed chief justice of the Northwest Territories (a position that did not at the time exist). In 1898, Sifton re-entered politics—Hall speculates to increase his chances at a judgeship—by challenging Robert Brett, the long-time Member of the Legislative Assembly of the Northwest Territories for Banff, in the 1898 territorial election. Election day returns showed Sifton with a plurality of thirty-six votes, but by the time contested ballots were dealt with this had turned into a majority of two votes for Brett. Sifton successfully challenged this result in court, and in the ensuing by-election he defeated Brett by a comfortable margin. One oft-repeated anecdote from the campaign involved a campaign forum for which Brett was late. After giving his own speech, Sifton offered to give the still-absent Brett's speech as well, since he had heard it so many times. He did so, and when Brett eventually arrived to give a speech nearly identical to the one Sifton had given on his behalf he was puzzled by the audience's amusement.

Having defeated Brett, Sifton was immediately one of the area's most prominent Liberals, and he was named president of the District of Alberta Liberals shortly thereafter. In 1901, Clifford Sifton appointed James Hamilton Ross, Northwest Territories Treasurer and Minister of Public Works, as Commissioner of Yukon. It fell to Northwest Territories Premier Frederick William Gordon Haultain to fill the ensuing vacancy and, to preserve the delicate non-partisan balance of his administration, he had to pick a successor who was, like Ross, a Liberal. The role fell to Sifton. Soon after his appointment, Clifford offered him his sought-after position of Northwest Territories Chief Justice. Arthur declined on the basis of his recently assumed ministerial duties, but he made it clear that he was still interested in receiving the judicial post eventually.

As minister, Sifton had to cope with increasing expenses and with grants from the federal government that did not keep pace. He dealt with this through support for territorial autonomy—the creation of one or more new provinces from the Northwest Territories. Campaigning on this position, he was re-elected in the 1902 territorial election. Months later, however, T. H. Maguire retired as territorial chief justice, and this time Sifton accepted his brother's offer of the position. He resigned his political offices in January 1903.

=== Career as a jurist ===
Despite the accusations of nepotism that greeted his appointment on January 3, 1903, Sifton fast became a well-respected judge. He served as chief justice of the Northwest Territories until September 16, 1907, when the Supreme Court of Alberta was established, whereupon he headed this new court, sitting in Calgary as the first Chief Justice of Alberta. He was notoriously difficult for barristers to read: he generally heard arguments expressionlessly smoking a cigar, and it was as a judge that he first acquired his long-time nickname of the Sphinx for his inscrutability. In one trial, he sat apparently vigorously taking notes during both sides' lengthy closing arguments and, once they concluded, immediately delivered his judgment. The bewildered lawyers wondered what he had been writing down, since he had obviously made up his mind before closing arguments; once Sifton had left the courtroom, they found their answer in the form of page after page covered with the judge's signature. He rarely recorded his ratio decidendi but, despite this, few of his decisions were overturned on appeal. It has also been argued that his fellow judges had difficulty ruling on appeals from his decisions specifically because he rarely provided reasons. Much of his work was in criminal law, dealing especially with theft of livestock (in which cases he generally delivered a sentence of three years hard labour, severe by the standards of the day). By the end of his judicial career, he had convicted as many Americans as Canadians. His rulings were generally concerned with practicalities rather than legal theory, based more on social morality than legal precedent, and he did not establish any important precedents.

In 1907, Sifton was one member of a three-member commission assigned to investigate labour unrest between coal miners and mine operators. His colleagues were mining executive Lewis Stockett and miners' union executive William Haysom. Miners' demands included increased wages, a reduction in working hours to eight per day (from ten), the posting of mine inspection reports, the isolated storage of explosives, the use of non-freezing explosives, and semi-monthly rather than monthly pay. The mine operators objected to this last point on the basis that many miners did not report to work the day after payday, and it was thus desirable to keep paydays to a minimum. The commission recommended that children under sixteen should not be allowed to work in mines, that inspectors should post their reports, that mine sites should have bath houses, and that ventilation inspection should be improved. It also recommended that Albertans keep a supply of coal on hand during the summer for winter use. The commission was silent on wages (except to say that these should not be fixed by legislation), the operation of company stores (a sore point among the miners), and the incorporation of mine unions (which was recommended by mines but opposed by the unions). It made no recommendation about working hours, but Premier Alexander Rutherford's government legislated an eight-hour day anyway.

He resigned from the bench on May 25, 1910, to become Premier.

== Premier ==
=== Ascension and cabinet-building ===
In 1910, the Liberal government of Alexander Cameron Rutherford was embroiled in the Alberta and Great Waterways (A&GW) Railway scandal. Accusations of favouritism by the government towards the Alberta and Great Waterways Railway had split the Liberal Party, and Rutherford's ability to remain at its head was in doubt. Lieutenant-Governor George Bulyea, a Liberal who had reluctantly asked Rutherford to form a government in 1905, saw his doubts about the Premier's leadership skills validated and quietly began looking for candidates to replace him and save the Liberal Party. Several possibilities—including William Henry Cushing, Peter Talbot, and Frank Oliver—were considered and either rejected or found to be uninterested in the job. As early as March 14, Bulyea had concluded that Sifton might be "the only permanent solution", though it was not until May that the Lieutenant-Governor was able to secure Rutherford's agreement to resign and the agreement of both major factions in the Liberal caucus to accept Sifton as Premier. Even up until the last minute, Members of the Legislative Assembly (MLAs) loyal to Charles Wilson Cross—the province's Attorney-General and a staunch Rutherford ally—threatened to scuttle the arrangement unless Cross was kept on as attorney-general, to which Sifton refused to agree. On May 26, Rutherford resigned and Arthur Sifton became the second Premier of Alberta.

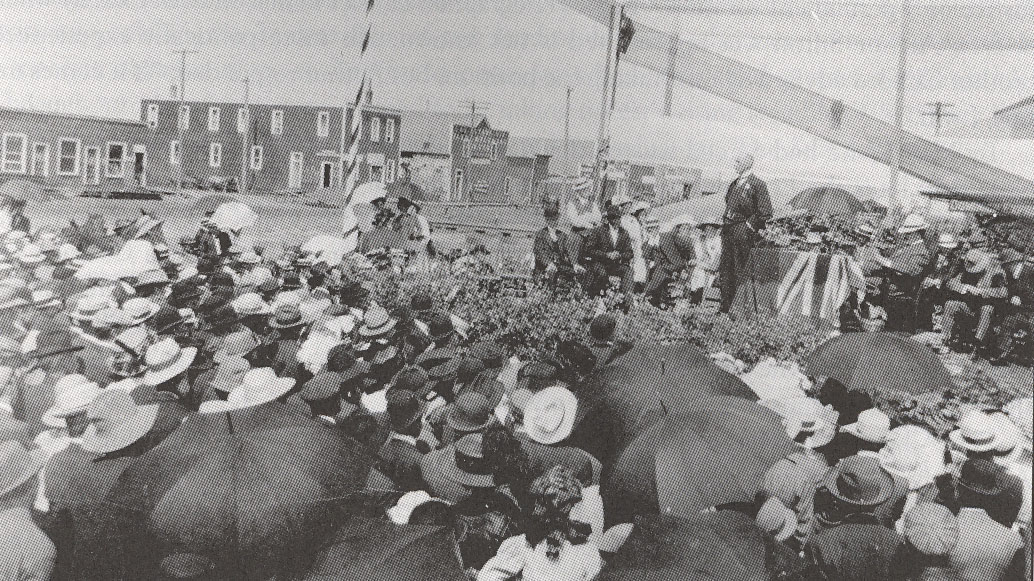
Sifton addressing a political meeting in Wetaskiwin, August 1910

One of his first challenges was to craft a cabinet satisfactory to all factions; this he did by excluding the leaders of all sides. He himself took the portfolios of Public Works and Provincial Treasurer. Charles R. Mitchell, who like Sifton had been a judge during the scandal and had accordingly played no part in it, became Minister of Education and Attorney-General. Archibald J. McLean was named Provincial Secretary. His support for the insurgents (though not as one of their leaders) was offset by the continuation of Rutherford's Agriculture Minister Duncan Marshall, who had played no particular role during the scandal but had remained loyal to Rutherford. To the consternation of the opposition Conservatives, Bulyea prorogued the legislation before this new government's strength could be tested by a vote of confidence. Still, its acceptance by the Liberal caucus can be measured by the fact that only one member, Ezra Riley, resigned in protest. Riley objected to the exclusion from cabinet of insurgency leader W. H. Cushing; after his resignation he ran as an independent Liberal in the ensuing by-election, but was defeated by Sifton supporter Archibald J. McArthur. As time began to heal old wounds, Sifton expanded his cabinet to include several of the old adversaries: in February 1912 Cross was re-instated as Attorney-General and rebel leader John R. Boyle was made Minister of Education (Mitchell, who had previously held both of these posts, was transferred to the Public Works portfolio). The other new additions to cabinet—Malcolm McKenzie as Provincial Treasurer and Charles Stewart in the new position of Minister of Municipal Affairs—had voted with the Rutherford government during the scandal.

Another early challenge for the new Premier was to win a seat in the Legislative Assembly of Alberta. Although he lived and worked in Calgary, his first cabinet was composed mostly of southern members (McLean represented Lethbridge District, Marshall represented Olds, and Mitchell was soon elected in Medicine Hat), so Sifton had Archibald Campbell resign his Vermilion seat and sought election there. Sifton made few promises during the campaign, though he did identify as his priorities "the development of [Alberta's] agricultural and mining resources and the transportation facilities". Despite accusations by the Conservatives that the Liberals bought "the foreign vote" with beer, whiskey, and tobacco, he won a comfortable majority.

=== Railway policy ===
Before resigning, Rutherford's government had called a Royal Commission into the Alberta and Great Waterways affair, and this commission had not reported by the time that Sifton took office. Between that and the proroguing of the legislature, the new Premier enjoyed a calm that lasted until November 10, when the legislature reconvened. Conservative leader Edward Michener attacked the government's speech from the throne for failing to commit itself on railway policy and attacked Sifton for failing to call a general election or seek the confidence of the legislature during his first half year in office. In the meantime, Sifton was facing a breach in his own party on the railway question. Many Liberals from the south of the province, including Sifton himself, felt inclined to abandon the construction of "pioneer" railways (such as the Alberta and Great Waterways Railway) designed to hasten the settlement of the province's emptier areas, and concentrate only on those connecting major population centres. Members from the north of the province, who comprised most of the Liberal caucus, disagreed, and were vehement in their insistence that the A&GW be built. Even among this latter group there were divisions: some Liberals agreed with the Conservatives that the railway should be directly built by the government, while others, including Cross, favoured a partnership with a "responsible company". These divisions were not calmed by the release of the commission's report, whose majority condemned Rutherford and Cross for poor judgment even as it concluded that there was insufficient evidence to find that they had engaged in improper behaviour.

It was against this backdrop that Sifton announced his government's policy with respect to the Alberta and Great Waterways Railway Company. Because it had failed to meet its construction obligations, Sifton introduced legislation to confiscate the proceeds of the sale of government-guaranteed bonds sold to finance the railway's construction. He gave no indication of how the money, which was being held in trust by several banks, would be used. Cross's faction of (primarily northern) Liberals opposed the bill on the grounds that it did not commit the government to using the money to construct the railway, while the Conservatives opposed it as an unjustified confiscation of private property. As Conservative R. B. Bennett said,

[The bill is] an act of confiscation, an act such as never before has been carried out in the British Empire, an act such as has few equals in the pages of history. Similar acts have been carried out, once in Nicaragua and Virginia, and in South Carolina and only in times of war or revolution ... In my opinion the bargain was an improvident one, but that does not justify confiscation ... I did not think the new road would pay. But it is a new doctrine that because a bargain did not pay it should be repudiated and one should become a repudiator of bargains and a confiscator of private rights.

In speaking of A&GW President William Clarke (an American), Bennett went on to say "Clarke I despise but Clarke I am bound to respect, because this province gave him a right by charter and if I know the United States I do not think it will allow this province to take his property without due process of the law." The Conservatives, however, had not been expected to support the legislation; the real question was whether Sifton could command enough support among Liberals to pass it. After all, during the Alberta and Great Waterways crisis only nine months earlier, a legislature of very similar makeup had endorsed the Rutherford government's handling of railway policy by a vote of twenty-three votes to fifteen; would Sifton's bill, effectively a repudiation of the Rutherford policy, convince enough Liberals to change sides? The answer came in December, when the bill passed third reading by a vote of twenty-five votes to fourteen. Nine Liberals had reversed themselves and saved Sifton's government, though both Cross and Rutherford were among those to vote against it.

Despite calls from Clarke for the federal government to use its power of reservation to stop the legislation, Bulyea granted royal assent December 16. Sifton, in his capacity as provincial treasurer, immediately tried to access the money; the Royal, Dominion, and Union banks, where the funds were deposited, refused payment. Attorney-General Mitchell sued the banks; on November 4, 1911, Justice Charles Allan Stuart of the Supreme Court of Alberta found in the government's favour. The Royal Bank appealed this ruling and unsuccessfully petitioned the federal government to use its powers of disallowance to strike down the provincial act. In the meantime, Sifton announced a new railway policy that would see eight new lines constructed by private companies with the assistance of provincial loan guarantees, including several pioneer lines; this policy, in its resemblance to the Rutherford policy, met with the approval of the Cross faction, and the Liberals were once more united.

In 1912, Justice Stuart's ruling was upheld by the Supreme Court of Alberta en banc. Again the Royal Bank appealed, and on January 31, 1913, the Judicial Committee of the Privy Council, which was at the time Canada's highest judicial authority, found for the Royal Bank, ruling that the provincial government did not have the right to confiscate money raised outside of the province. On September 22 Sifton announced new management of the AG&W agreeable to the bondholders, the government, and the banks. The Conservatives protested that other companies were prepared to construct the railroad for less than the sum agreed on with the A&GW, to which Sifton replied that the Privy Council's ruling meant that the government could not use the money raised to deal with any other company. The Conservatives filibustered the legislation and moved a series of amendments (including one calling for the scheme to be put to referendum), but the Liberals voted unanimously in its favour. The Alberta and Great Waterways saga had reached its end, and Sifton's caucus was never more united.

=== Natural resources ===
When Alberta and Saskatchewan were made provinces in 1905, the federal government retained control over their lands and natural resources, which made the new provinces unique in Canada. The Rutherford government acquiesced to this state of affairs; because the terms of confederation had been drawn up by the Liberal government of Sir Wilfrid Laurier, it was natural for the provincial Liberal Party to cast itself as their defender. In this capacity, Rutherford pointed to the $375,000 per year that the provincial government received from the federal government as compensation. In 1910, however, Liberal MLA Alwyn Bramley-Moore (who was a staunch provincial rights advocate and who many years later was called "Alberta's first separatist" by the Edmonton Journal) moved a resolution calling on the Sifton government to "take such steps as may be deemed necessary to acquire the control of all such natural resources as are of purely local concern". Sifton responded that it was already the intention of his government to begin negotiations with the federal government to this end. He asserted "I have always believed ... that we should administer our mines and timber. The question is not now whether we would like to control our natural resources, but what is the best way to get them."

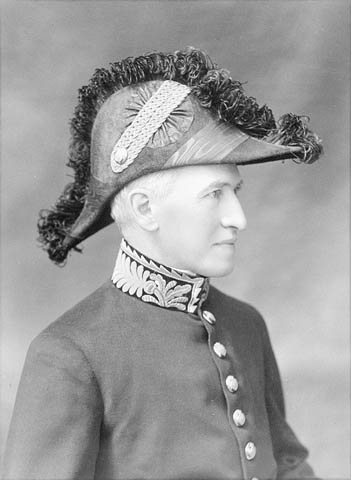
Sifton at the coronation of George V of the United Kingdom, 1910

Soon after, Sifton made a trip east and spoke on the subject of provincial resource control to the Canadian Club of Toronto, where his points were well received. In May 1910, Sifton and Saskatchewan Premier Walter Scott met with Laurier in Ottawa, where he was able to secure the Prime Minister's agreement that if the Liberals were re-elected in the 1911 federal election they would transfer to Alberta control over its resources. This election was fought primarily on the issue of reciprocity, which was popular in Alberta, and Sifton campaigned actively for Laurier (distinguishing himself from his brother, who broke with Laurier on reciprocity). Despite winning six of Alberta's seven seats, the Liberals were defeated nationally by Robert Borden's Conservatives.

Initially, this did not appear to be a problem; Borden had long called for the transfer of resource control to the prairie provinces, but when Sifton and Scott raised the issue with the new Prime Minister, little action resulted. Borden stalled for some time, and it emerged that he did not wish to buoy the fortunes of the provincial Liberal parties by giving them the political victory that would result from the transfer of resource control. Upon the outbreak of the First World War, the issue fell out of public prominence, and it was not until 1930 that Alberta achieved this long-time objective.

=== Agricultural policy ===
Sifton's time as Premier corresponded with the rise of the United Farmers of Alberta (UFA) as a political force. Formed in 1909 by the merger of the Society of Equity and the Alberta Farmers' Association, the UFA later became a political party and governed Alberta from 1921 until 1935. During Sifton's tenure, however, its entry into direct politics was still several years away, and it confined itself to advocating for farmers' interests. In a province in which 50,004 people voted in the 1909 provincial election, the UFA claimed an initial membership of 2,100, which climbed to 9,400 in 1913. Moreover, these figures did not include the many farmers who were active in the organization without paying dues; the UFA was a force to be reckoned with, and Sifton took notice.

The UFA's first provincial victory took place in 1910, and involved the construction of agricultural colleges. Premier Alexander Rutherford, always a stalwart ally of the University of Alberta, approved a plan to locate Alberta's first agricultural college on the university's campus, in Rutherford's home town of Strathcona. At the 1910 UFA convention, a resolution proposed putting the college in southern Alberta, though it was supplanted by an Edward Michener motion calling for the UFA's leadership to consult with the province on a mutually amenable location. After consultation with the UFA, Sifton agreed that, in addition to the college, agricultural schools would be built around the province, and that farmers would be guaranteed representation on the college's board. In fact, Sifton held off on the establishment of the college all together in favour of the creation of seven demonstration farms in different regions of the province. In 1912, the government announced the creation of agricultural colleges in connection with three of these farms (all of them in the ridings of provincial cabinet ministers: Duncan Marshall's Olds, Claresholm in Archibald McLean's Lethbridge District, and Sifton's Vermilion).

Another of the UFA's policies called for a single tax on land to replace most other forms of taxation. The farmers hoped that this tax would help replace tariffs, which made it harder for them to export their produce, and shift the tax burden towards cities, where land values were higher. They also called for a surtax on undeveloped land to curb land speculation and encourage the sale of land to farmers. On this demand too, Sifton acted: in 1911–1912 he allowed municipalities to levy property taxes and required that rural municipalities tax only land, and in 1914 he imposed a provincial tax on undeveloped land to discourage land speculation. Other UFA-motivated acts by Sifton's government included abandonment of a 1912 plan to privatize hail insurance (it instead enacted a municipal insurance scheme) and the prohibition of contract clauses that allowed farm machinery companies to avoid responsibility for their products. Perhaps the most important piece of farm legislation passed by Sifton's government was the incorporation of the Alberta Farmers' Co-operative Elevator Company (AFCEC). Though the UFA's first preference was for government ownership and operation of grain elevators, which Sifton refused, it gladly accepted the AFCEC, in which only farmers could hold shares and which was supported by provincial startup loans.

Hall writes that "the Sifton government in effect responded wholly or in part to practically every resolution from the 1913 UFA convention related to provincial powers." This rate could not sustain itself, however, especially once the First World War began to occupy an increasing share of the province's attention and resources. During the 1916 legislative session, the government acted on only two of the UFA's twenty-three demands of that year — one to allow the sale of gopher poison by UFA locals, and one dealing with brand inspection.

=== Democratic and moral reform ===
It was not only in agricultural policy that the UFA spread its influence. The organization had a strong progressive bent, and advocated direct democracy, women's suffrage, and prohibition. In response to the first of these, Sifton in 1913 introduced the Direct Democracy Act. Though it went somewhat less far than the UFA would have liked—for example, it made no provision for recall of elected officials—it did allow for Albertans to call a referendum directly by submitting a petition including the names of eligible voters totalling ten percent of the votes cast in the previous provincial election, including at least eight percent in each of eighty-five percent of the province's ridings. The Conservatives were on record as supporting direct democracy, and could therefore criticize the bill only in detail.

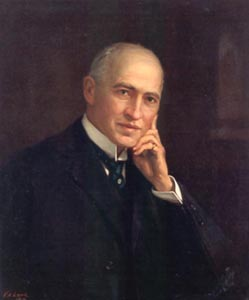
Sifton's official portrait, by Victor Albert Long

The large number of signatures required (beginning with the 1913 election, 9,399 signatures were required) meant that only an issue capable of galvanizing much of the province could lead to a referendum. Prohibition was such an issue. The Conservatives were advocates of such a referendum (during the 1st Alberta Legislative Assembly, Conservative Cornelius Hiebert had advocated prohibition or, failing that, a government monopoly on alcohol sales), but Sifton and his Liberals were less enthusiastic. They knew the boon to government coffers that liquor sales represented, and were not eager to alienate either the UFA's moral reformers or the province's hoteliers and saloonkeepers. Once the referendum legislation was in place, however, its advocates wasted no time: in 1914 the legislature accepted a petition bearing 23,656 names, and duly called a referendum on the subject. The Alberta prohibition referendum passed resoundingly, and the legislature passed the Prohibition Act in the spring of 1916. Initially the new Act appeared successful: in 1917 there were 5,151 convictions for all crimes across Alberta, as compared to an annual average of 12,706 over the preceding four years. By the time the province's enforcement of the act was exposed as being either deliberately lax or merely futile, depending on the observer, Sifton had left office.

Alberta's women, especially those of the UFA-affiliated United Farm Women of Alberta, were active in the province's moral reform movement. They were also active in seeking the vote: in 1913 a delegation of them arrived at the legislature demanding the vote; Sifton asked them "did you ladies wash up your luncheon dishes before you came down here to ask me for the vote? If you haven't you'd better go home because you're not going to get any votes from me." In October 1914 another delegation arrived, bearing the signatures of 40,000 people. At that time, the Premier agreed that most traditional objections to extension of the franchise were "played out", but expressed concern at the increases that would result to the cost of elections and uncertainty at whether most of the province's women actually wanted suffrage. In February 1915 a larger delegation arrived at the legislature and occupied the MLAs' seats, demanding that the franchise be extended quickly enough to allow women to vote in the upcoming prohibition referendum; an angry Sifton refused and suggested to the women that if they wanted the vote, they should contact their MLAs and promise that they would use their votes to re-elect them, "which is after all one of the strongest way in which you can appeal to male human nature, as represented in the legislature." Even so, he committed to raising the issue in the legislature after the referendum. On September 17, 1915, he told UFA President James Speakman that he had given instructions for the preparation of a statute "placing men and women in Alberta on the basis of absolute equality so far as Provincial matters are concerned." True to his word, he introduced legislation in the spring of 1916 giving women the vote in all provincial and municipal elections. The Conservatives supported it enthusiastically, and only St. Albert MLA Lucien Boudreau voted against it (though Ribstone Liberal James Gray Turgeon admitted that he was supporting his leader's legislation against his own convictions).

=== Style and political success ===
Arthur Sifton's political style was to remain aloof and detached, and to say no more than necessary; this cemented his reputation as "the Sphinx". He was authoritarian and, while he inspired respect, he was not loved; historian L. G. Thomas credits him with holding the Liberal Party together through his strength, but blames him for failing to heal its underlying divisions. Sifton was originally selected as Premier in the hopes that he would lead the Liberal Party to continued dominance of provincial politics in Alberta. His success in this regard was mixed: although he led the party to victory in the 1913 and 1917 elections, its majorities declined each time. Moreover, his victories were marred by accusations of unethical electoral tactics.

In advance of the 1913 election, government-sponsored redistribution legislation increased the number of ridings from 41 to 56 and left them of unequal size; only 103 votes were cast in Clearwater in its first election. The Liberals argued that a model of straight representation by population was inappropriate in a province in which some districts were growing far more quickly than others. David Hall has called the bill a "flagrant gerrymander" and the ensuing election the "crookedest election in Alberta history". There being few policy differences separating the Liberals from the Conservatives, the electoral battle was instead an organizational one, with the two sides accusing one another of bribing ethnic minorities with alcohol and importing elections workers from outside of the province to bribe, intimidate, and mislead rural voters. The Conservatives also accused the Liberals of using government-paid civil servants to campaign for their re-election. Sifton, not confident of victory in his own riding, sought election both there and in Macleod. In the event, he was defeated there but retained his Vermilion riding.

Since the 1917 election was held in the throes of the First World War, it was unlikely to be an election as usual—indeed, the Conservatives favoured prolonging the legislature until the end of the war. Sifton was not willing to go that far, but did introduce legislation to re-elect, by act of the legislature, the twelve MLAs who had enlisted in the armed forces—of these, seven were Liberals and five Conservatives; one of the Liberals, Joseph Stauffer of Disbury, was killed in action before the legislation took effect. The Conservatives supported this legislation, though they later cast aspersions on it by suggesting that of the Liberals re-elected, two had never left Canada. A second piece of election legislation provided for two special MLAs to be elected by the 38,000 Albertans serving overseas; the Conservatives protested that two MLAs was not sufficient for such a large number of voters, especially since Clearwater by this time had only 116 eligible voters.

After a sedate election that the Liberals won by a slightly reduced majority, Sifton announced his resignation as Premier to enter federal politics. Sifton's 1917 victory was the Liberals' last: his successor, Charles Stewart, lost the 1921 election to the newly-political UFA. In Thomas's estimation, Sifton would have faced a similar fate in 1917 if the UFA had run candidates then.

== Federal politics ==
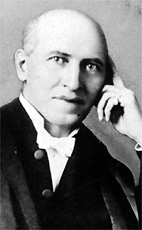
Sifton as a federal cabinet minister

The Conscription Crisis of 1917 divided the Liberal Party of Canada, and this division extended into the provincial camp. Federal Liberal leader Laurier opposed Prime Minister Borden's proposal to implement wartime conscription, a stand which many Liberals, especially those outside Quebec, denounced as unpatriotic. Borden reached out to these Liberals to propose a coalition government, to be led by him and to include Conservatives and pro-conscription Liberals. Clifford Sifton was a major broker of the resulting deal and, when the question of a suitable Alberta representative in the cabinet came up, Arthur Sifton was a natural choice. In 1914, he had announced Alberta's willingness to sacrifice "its last dollar and its last man", and was a staunch supporter of conscription. He had agreed by August 1917 to join the Unionist government, and resigned as Premier in October.

Although he was only 58 at the time of joining government, his health was suffering. He was short of energy and required a car to transport him even the several hundred metres from his Ottawa residence to the House of Commons of Canada. Because of this, he was given relatively undemanding portfolios: Minister of Customs and Inland Revenue, Minister of Public Works, and Secretary of State. Hall has called him among the least visible of Borden's ministers. Because of his health and his short tenure in each position, he made very little impact. Despite this, Sifton was highly regarded by his colleagues. Borden himself later stated "there was no one in whose judgment I placed firmer reliance". Sifton was appointed to the Imperial Privy Council in the 1920 New Year Honours, entitling him to the style "The Right Honourable".

Sifton was one of four Canadian delegates to the Paris Peace Conference of 1919, along with Borden, Charles Doherty, and George Eulas Foster. There, he acted as vice chair of the Commission on Ports, Waterways, and Railways, and served on the Commission on Aerial Navigation. In these capacities he argued for Canada to be treated as an independent state at a time when its foreign policy was still managed by the United Kingdom. On June 28, 1919, Arthur Sifton was one of two Canadians to sign the Treaty of Versailles.

== Death and legacy ==
In January 1921, Sifton became ill and took leave from his duties for a few days. Although his recovery seemed imminent, his condition suddenly worsened. He died at his home on January 21 at the age of 62. Borden mourned the loss of "a public servant of the highest ability and of the most conspicuous patriotism". He was buried in Ottawa's Beechwood Cemetery.

His public papers are in the Canadian archives, with some legal papers in a legal collection in Alberta, and others mixed in with those of his brother Clifford.

== Electoral record ==
=== As party leader ===
1917 Alberta provincial election
Party	Party leader	# of candidates	Seats			Popular vote		
Party	Party leader	# of candidates	1913	1917	% Change	#	%	% Change
Liberal	Arthur Sifton	49	38/39	34	-12.8%	54,212	48.14%	-1.09%
Conservative	Edward Michener	48	17	19	+11.8%	47,055	41.79%	-3.31%
Independent		11	-	2		6,569	5.83%	+2.08%
Labour		2		1		3,576	3.17%	
Socialist		3	-	-	-	784	0.70%	-1.17%
Nonpartisan League		1		-		416	0.37%	
Sub-total		114	55/56	56	-	112,612	100%	
Soldiers' vote (Province at large)		21		2		13,286	21.00%	
Total		135	55/56	58	+3.6%	125,898	100%	
1913 Alberta provincial election
Party	Party leader	# of candidates	Seats			Popular vote		
Party	Party leader	# of candidates	1909	1913	% Change	#	%	% Change
Liberal	Arthur Sifton	55/56	36	38/39	+8.3%	47,748	49.23%	-10.03%
Conservative	Edward Michener	56	2	17	+750%	43,737	45.10%	+13.4%
Independent		14	1	-	-100%	3,639	3.75%	+0.36%
Socialist	Charles M. O'Brien	5	1	-	-100%	1,814	1.87%	-0.73%
Independent	Independent Liberal		1	1	-	47	0.05%	-2.57%
Total		132	41	55/56	+36.6%	96,985	100%	

=== As MLA ===
1917 Alberta general election results (Vermilion)		Turnout N.A.	
Liberal	Arthur Sifton	2,063	63.0%
Conservative	John Baker Burch	1,210	37.0%
1913 Alberta general election results (Vermilion)		Turnout N.A.	
Liberal	Arthur Sifton	772	47.7%
Conservative	J. George Clark	571	35.3%
Independent	Gregory Krikevsky	276	17.0%
1913 Alberta general election results (Macleod)		Turnout N.A.	
Conservative	Robert Patterson	579	50.8%
Liberal	Arthur Sifton	560	49.2%
1910 by-election results (Vermilion)		Turnout N.A.	
Liberal	Arthur Sifton	1,018	58.9%
Conservative	J. George Clark	710	41.1%
1902 Northwest Territories general election results (Banff)		Turnout N.A.	
	Arthur Sifton	296	81.3%
	Robert Smith	68	18.7%
1901 by-election results (Banff)		Turnout N.A.	
	Arthur Sifton	Acclaimed	
1899 by-election results (Banff)		Turnout N.A.	
	Arthur Sifton	193	54.8%
	Robert Brett	159	45.2%
1898 Northwest Territories general election results (Banff)		Turnout N.A.	
	Robert Brett	181	50.3%
	Arthur Sifton	179	49.7%

=== As MP ===
1917 Canadian federal election: Medicine Hat
Party	Candidate	Votes	%	±%
Government (Unionist)	Arthur Sifton	6,869	63.04	–
Opposition (Laurier Liberals)	Clifford Bernardo Reilly	3,568	32.74	–
Nonpartisan League	George Paton	460	4.22	–
Total valid votes		10,897	100.00	
Total rejected ballots		–		
Turnout		10,897	80.15	+18.78
Eligible voters		13,596		
Government (Unionist) gain from Liberal		Swing		–
Source: Library of Parliament

== Archives ==
There are Arthur Sifton fonds at Library and Archives Canada and the Provincial Archives of Alberta.
