= Robert Brett =

Canadian politician (1851–1929)

The Honourable Robert Brett
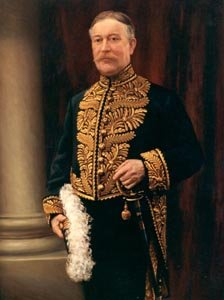

2nd Lieutenant Governor of Alberta
- In office October 20, 1915 – October 29, 1925
- Monarch: George V
- Governors General: The Duke of Connaught and Strathearn; The Duke of Devonshire; The Viscount Byng of Vimy
- Premier: Arthur Sifton; Charles Stewart; Herbert Greenfield
- Preceded by: George H. V. Bulyea
- Succeeded by: William Egbert

Chairman of the Lieutenant Governor's Advisory Council
- In office June 30, 1888 – November 7, 1891
- Monarch: Victoria
- Lieutenant Governor: Edgar Dewdney; Joseph Royal
- Preceded by: Office established
- Succeeded by: Frederick W. A. G. Haultain (as the Chairman of the Executive Committee)

Member of the Legislative Assembly of the Northwest Territories for Red Deer
- In office June 30, 1888 – November 7, 1891
- Preceded by: District established
- Succeeded by: Francis Wilkins

Member of the Legislative Assembly of the Northwest Territories for Banff
- In office November 7, 1891 – June 27, 1899
- Preceded by: District established
- Succeeded by: Arthur Lewis Sifton

Personal details
- Born: Robert George Brett; November 16, 1851 Strathroy, Canada West
- Died: September 16, 1929 (aged 77) Calgary, Alberta, Canada
- Party: Liberal; Conservative
- Spouse: Louise T. Hungerford (m. 1878)
- Children: Dr. Reginald Harry and Robert Earl
- Education: University of Toronto
- Occupation: Physician and surgeon, businessman
- Profession: Politician

Robert George Brett (November 16, 1851 – September 16, 1929) was a politician and physician in the North-West Territories and Alberta, Canada, and was the second lieutenant governor of Alberta.

== Early life ==
Robert George Brett was born on November 16, 1851, in Strathroy, Adelaide Township, Middlesex County, Canada West (Ontario), the eldest of four children to James Brett (b. 1821) and Catherine Mallon (b. 1825). Brett's parents were both immigrants from Ireland and early settlers of the Middlesex region. James Brett was a farmer and carpenter, and later worked as a merchant and insurance agent.

Brett was well educated, attending Strathroy Grammar School, leaving in 1867 to apprentice under Dr. F. R. Eccles before attending the University of Toronto's Victoria College and attaining his medical degree in 1872. Brett briefly practised in the small village of Arkona, Ontario, from 1874 to 1879, and during this time Brett also completed his postgraduate work in New York City, Philadelphia and later in 1894, Vienna, Austria.

Brett was married on June 26, 1878, to Louise T. Hungerford, and together they had four children, all four of whom predeceased their parents, their eldest daughter, Genevieve, died as a four-month-old infant in October 1881 and is buried at Arkona Cemetery.

== Medical career ==
In 1874 he located in Arkona to begin his practice with Dr. F. R. Eccles. While in Arkona, Brett served a term as the village reeve.

Brett moved west to Winnipeg sometime between 1880 and 1882 (his family were listed in the 1881 census in Arkona). Brett arrived during a real estate boom in Winnipeg, which subsequently crashed causing Brett to lose his investments. In August 1883, Brett travelled west on the second train to Calgary with his brother-in-law Dr. Neville James Lindsay, where he provided medical services on contract with the Canadian Pacific Railway (CPR) for railway workers in the Kicking Horse and Rogers passes. During this time Brett established a hospital in the Banff area.

Brett returned to Winnipeg in fall of 1883 when he was one of the founders of the Manitoba Medical College, where Brett was the first professor of materia medica and therapeutics, and was later appointed professor of obstetrics and gynaecology. Brett later sat as a board member on the University of Manitoba.

In June 1884, Brett returned to Calgary and the mountains to provide medical services to the CPR. Brett established a temporary field hospital in Laggan (later Lake Louise), where he was joined by his brother Dr. William Brett, who died during the period. After the railway was completed in 1885, Brett became the CPR surgeon for mining communities in the area and ran a small hospital in Canmore, Alberta. Later in 1889, Dr. Lindsay relinquished his CPR medical contract, which Brett added to his own, becoming responsible for all CPR medical care west of Calgary to Donald, British Columbia. In 1909, he established the Brett Hospital in Banff.

Brett was a strong proponent of standardized examination and licensing in the medical profession, and in 1909 proposed the four western provinces form a licensing body for medical practitioners in the West.

== Banff Sanitarium ==
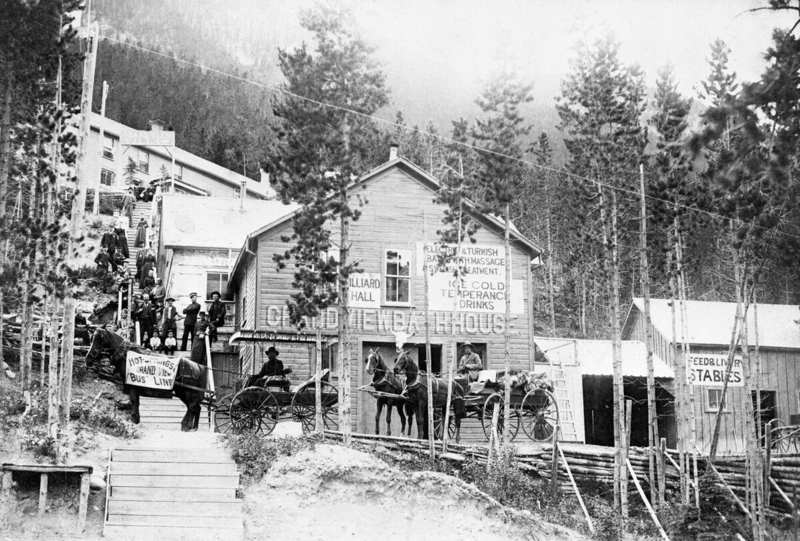
The Grand View Villa, 1890s

While working for the CPR, Brett became familiar with the hot springs on Sulphur Mountain. Desirous to capitalize on their potential, he secured a lease for the purposes of constructing a hotel in the Banff townsite in 1886 and began construction on the Banff Hot Springs Sanitarium, later renamed the Sanitarium Hotel. The hotel was extensively modern and had baths that drew water directly from the hot springs via pipes which ran from the hot springs to the hotel; a distance of over 2.4 kilometres. It also featured a state-of-the-art hospital, which attracted patients from all over North America. Brett also constructed the Grand View Villa at the hot springs themselves, which served as the first permanent bathing house at the hot springs. However, after a few years he divested from the Grand View Villa and focused his attention on the Sanitarium Hotel and medical contracts with the CPR.

Over the years extensive improvements were made to the Sanitarium Hotel. Bathing and guest facilities were expanded, an attached drug store and theatre were constructed, and a bottling plant selling water from the springs as a tonic. In 1909, following the construction of the Brett Hospital, the hospital facilities at the Sanitarium were closed and the hotel instead focused on providing strictly accommodations. In 1922, the Sanitarium Hotel changed its name to the Bretton Hall Hotel. In 1933, it fell victim to a catastrophic fire and was mostly destroyed. Rather than rebuild, the hotel was torn down and the land was used to build the Parks Canada administration building.

== Political career ==
In May 1888, the 6th Canadian Parliament passed The North-West Territories Act of 1888 which brought responsible government to the North-West Territories. The act abolished the 1st Council of the North-West Territories, which consisted of a mixture of appointed and elected seats, and formed a new primarily elected assembly; however, the assembly did lack aspects of responsible government in other Canadian provinces such as an Executive Council and control over federal grant spending.

=== Chairman of the Lieutenant Governor's Advisory Council ===
In the first election of the responsible government age in 1888, Brett was elected to the North-West Legislative Assembly as a member of the electoral district for Red Deer, defeating Alfred Brealey with 325 votes to 208. His nomination had taken place without his knowledge while he was on a trip in central Canada. He became a de facto leader of the government as chairman of the Lieutenant-Governor's Advisory Council. Robert Brett had a rivalry with long-time member Frederick Haultain.

Lieutenant-Governor Joseph Royal did not provide the assembly with significant autonomy, and instead viewed it as an advisory body. In 1889 Royal refused to allow the assembly to decide how the territorial grant would be spent, a decision which caused the Advisory Council, including Brett, to tender their resignations on October 29. Royal selected Brett as the leader of the new Advisory Council and provided Brett with clarity on the powers the Advisory Council could exercise, which included territorial finances. The expansion of power was viewed unfavourably by the assembly, which sought greater controls and expansion of responsible government. The assembly passed a non-confidence motion directed towards the new Advisory Council only a few days later on November 9. Brett tendered his resignation to Royal, who refused it; however, in the next week Brett was unable to gain control of the assembly, and once again tendered his resignation, which was accepted by Royal on November 16.

Following the resignation, Royal attempted to govern independent of the assembly on the advice of two selected officials, but his decision was disallowed by Federal Justice Minister John Sparrow David Thompson. Royal once again appointed Brett to lead the Advisory Council in January 1890, a decision which infuriated the majority of the assembly, which refused to appoint members of the Advisory Council to committees and support bills introduced by the Advisory Council. Brett continued to hold his position and, in 1891 with Advisory Council member John Felton Betts, travelled to Ottawa to advocate for constitutional change towards more responsible government. Brett and Betts left Ottawa believing they had failed to convince the government, but after John A. Macdonald's death, the changes came in 1892 with amendments to the North-West Territories Act providing that the lieutenant-governor could only expend monies on the advice of the assembly.

Brett was returned by acclamation in the 1891 Northwest Territories general election as the member for Banff. Royal formed a new Advisory Council was formed under Frederick Haultain, which Brett was not a part of. During the upcoming session Brett advocated for the assembly to choose the membership of the Advisory Committee rather than the lieutenant-governor, and the proposal was adopted a year later in 1892. Brett was subsequently re-elected in 1894.

=== In opposition ===
In 1898 Robert Brett became the first Leader of the Official Opposition during a time in which the territorial legislature made a transition to party politics.

In the 1898 Northwest Territories general election Brett was opposed by Arthur Sifton in Banff and lost the election by a small margin. Election day returns showed Sifton with a plurality of thirty-six votes, but by the time contested ballots were dealt with this had turned into a majority of two votes for Brett. Brett contested the results of the election on grounds of "irregularities" in accordance with Section 106 of The Territories Elections Ordinance. Judge Charles Rouleau of the Supreme Court of the Northwest Territories, in the jurisdiction of Northern Alberta, found in favour of Brett by two votes. Sifton appealed the decision, and a by-election was scheduled for June 27, 1899. Sifton ended up winning the seat by a comfortable margin. One oft-repeated anecdote from the campaign involved a campaign forum for which Brett was late. After giving his own speech, Sifton offered to give the still-absent Brett's speech as well, since he had heard it so many times. He did so, and when Brett eventually arrived to give a speech nearly identical to the one Sifton had given on his behalf he was puzzled by the audience's amusement.

Brett unexpectedly dropped out of the 1902 election, a move that hurt the North-West Territories Liberal Party.

=== Alberta politics ===
When Alberta became a province in 1905 Brett ran in Banff for the Conservative Party but was defeated by Liberal candidate and future Speaker of the Legislative Assembly Charles W. Fisher. Wilfrid Laurier's Liberal government provided for a provisional capital in Edmonton in the Alberta Act, but permitted the new government to choose the location of the permanent seat of government. Prior to this decision, Brett travelled to Ottawa to lobby the federal government to choose Banff as the new capital of Alberta.

In 1909 he became president of the Alberta Conservative Party, and later contested the 1909 election for the Cochrane electoral district which replaced the Banff electoral district, losing again to Charles W. Fisher.

During his time in the early 20th century he served on a number of boards in Alberta, including the Senate of the University of Alberta.

== Lieutenant governor of Alberta ==
Robert Brett was appointed the second lieutenant governor of Alberta by Prince Arthur, Duke of Connaught and Strathearn, Governor General, on October 20, 1915, on the advice of Prime Minister Robert Borden. Brett was re-appointed for a second term on December 16, 1920.

In 1918, Premier Charles Stewart requested Brett retire Attorney General Charles Wilson Cross, who had refused to tender his resignation in hopes a compromise with the premier could be reached. After 12 days had passed without a response from Cross, Brett signed an order in council removing Charles Cross from his position, the first time in Alberta a lieutenant governor removed a cabinet member.

Robert Brett's term as lieutenant governor ended upon his successor William Egbert's appointment on October 29, 1925.

== Later life ==
Robert Brett died in Calgary on September 16, 1929; he was buried in the Banff Cemetery.

== Honours ==
Brett received an honorary doctorate of laws from the University of Alberta in 1915. The City of Edmonton named Robert Brett Park in his honour. The Banff Curling Club, which Brett helped found in 1900, named the Brett Trophy in his honour.

Mount Brett, a 2,984-metre mountain southwest of Banff, was named in his honour in 1916.

== Election results ==
1888 North-West Territories general election: Red Deer
Party	Candidate	Votes	%
Independent	Robert George Brett	325	60.98
Independent	Alfred Brealey	208	39.02
Total valid votes		538	100.00

1891 North-West Territories general election: Banff
Party	Candidate	Votes
Independent	Robert George Brett	Acclaimed
Total valid votes		0
Source(s) "North-West Territories: Council and Legislative Assembly, 1876-1905" (PDF). Saskatchewan Archives. Archived from the original (PDF) on 2007-09-28.

1894 North-West Territories general election: Banff
Party	Candidate	Votes	%
Independent	Robert George Brett	238	64.15
Independent	T. F. English	133	35.85
Total valid votes		371	100.00
Source(s) "North-West Territories: Council and Legislative Assembly, 1876-1905" (PDF). Saskatchewan Archives. Archived from the original (PDF) on 2007-09-28.

1898 North-West Territories general election: Banff
Party	Candidate	Votes	%	±%
Liberal	Robert George Brett	181	50.28	−13.87
Liberal–Conservative	Arthur Lewis Sifton	179	49.72	
Total valid votes		360	100.00	
Liberal hold		Swing		−13.87
Source(s) "North-West Territories: Council and Legislative Assembly, 1876-1905" (PDF). Saskatchewan Archives. Archived from the original (PDF) on 2007-09-28.

North-West Territories territorial by-election, June 27, 1899: Banff Upon the invalidation of the 1898 result
Party	Candidate	Votes	%	±%
Liberal–Conservative	Arthur Lewis Sifton	193	54.83	+5.11
Liberal	Robert George Brett	159	45.17	−5.11
Total valid votes		352	100.00	
Liberal–Conservative gain from Liberal		Swing		+5.11
Source(s) "North-West Territories: Council and Legislative Assembly, 1876-1905" (PDF). Saskatchewan Archives. Archived from the original (PDF) on 2007-09-28.

== Works cited ==
- Perry, Sandra E.; Powell, Karen L. (2006). "The Honourable Robert George Brett". In Massolin, Philip A. (ed.). On Behalf of the Crown, Lieutenant Governors of the North-West Territories and Alberta, 1869–2005. Edmonton, Alberta: Legislative Assembly of Alberta. pp. 368–388. ISBN 978-0-9689217-1-5.
- Lampard, Robert (Spring 2003). "Robert George Brett: "We shall not look upon his like again"". Alberta History. 51 (2): 13–22. ISSN 0316-1552. Gale A100807304.
- Hall, David J. (2005). "Brett, Robert George". In Cook, Ramsay; Bélanger, Réal (eds.). Dictionary of Canadian Biography. Vol. XV (1921–1930) (online ed.). University of Toronto Press.
- Lingard, C. Cecil (1978) [1946]. Territorial Government in Canada: The Autonomy Question in the Old North-West Territories. Toronto: University of Toronto Press. ISBN 978-0-8020-7095-1.
- Johnson, Margery. The Arkona Cemetery and Mennonite Cemetery in Warwick Township (Arkona: Arkona and Area Historical Society, 1985).
- Johnson, William F. Arkona Through the Years (Forest, Ontario: Pole Printing, 1976).
- Stott, Greg. Arkona: A History of an Ontario Community(Arkona, Ontario: Anokra Press, 2011).
