= West Calgary =

Former territorial electoral district in the North-West Territories, Canada

West Calgary was a single member electoral district that was mandated to return members to the Legislative Assembly of the North-West Territories, Canada, from 1894 until it was abolished in 1905.

== History ==
West Calgary was created from the old Calgary electoral district. This took place after the passage of the North-West Representation Act 1894 passed through parliament. Calgary's electoral districts were split into this district East Calgary and High River.

== Members of the Legislative Assembly (MLAs) ==
Name	Elected	Left office
Oswald Critchley	1894	1898
Richard Bennett	1898	1900
Richard Bennett	1901	1905

== Election results ==
=== 1894 ===
1894 North-West Territories general election
Name	Vote	%
Oswald Critchley	236	35.33%
Alexander Lucas	228	34.13%
Arthur Lewis Sifton	204	30.54%
Total votes	668	100%

=== 1898 ===
1898 North-West Territories general election
Name	Vote	%
Richard Bennett	291	40.87%
William W. Stuart	205	28.79%
James Muir	169	23.74%
Thomas Riley	47	6.60%
Total votes	712	100%

=== 1901 ===
March 22, 1901 by-election
Name	Vote	%
Richard Bennett	562	66.20%
Charles Stuart	287	33.80%
Total votes	849	100%

The by-election was caused by the resignation of Richard Bennett, who resigned his seat to run for the House of Commons of Canada in the 1900 Canadian federal election.

=== 1902 ===
1902 North-West Territories general election
Name	Vote	%
Richard Bennett	457	73.59%
Thomas Riley	164	26.31%
Total votes	621	100%

== See also ==
- List of Northwest Territories territorial electoral districts
- Canadian provincial electoral districts
- Calgary West federal electoral district.
- Calgary-West provincial electoral district
