= Edward Ludlow Wetmore =

Canadian politician

Mayor of Fredericton, New Brunswick
- In office 1874–1876

Member of the Legislative Assembly of New Brunswick for York
- In office 1883–1886

Chief Justice of Saskatchewan
- In office 1907–1912
- Succeeded by: Frederick W. A. G. Haultain

Personal details
- Born: March 24, 1841 Fredericton, New Brunswick, Canada
- Died: January 19, 1922 (aged 80) Victoria, British Columbia, Canada

Edward Ludlow Wetmore (March 24, 1841 – January 19, 1922) was a Canadian judge and politician.

Born in Fredericton, New Brunswick, the son of Charles Peters Wetmore and Sarah Burr Ketchum, he received a Bachelor of Arts degree from the University of New Brunswick in 1859. He was called to the New Brunswick bar in 1864. From 1874 to 1876, he was the mayor of Fredericton. He was elected to Legislative Assembly of New Brunswick and was Leader of the Opposition from 1883 to 1886. In 1886, he was appointed to the Supreme Court of New Brunswick.

In 1887, he was appointed puisne judge of the first Supreme Court of the Northwest Territories and in 1907 he was appointed the first Chief Justice of Saskatchewan. He served in this position until 1912.

In 1907, he became the first Chancellor of the University of Saskatchewan and served in this position until 1917.

He died in Victoria, British Columbia on January 19, 1922.

Academic offices
Preceded by New Position	Chancellor of the University of Saskatchewan; 1907–1917	Succeeded by Frederick W. A. G. Haultain
