= East Calgary (territorial electoral district) =

Former territorial electoral district in the North-West Territories, Canada

Northwest Territories electoral district

Defunct territorial electoral district
- Legislature: Legislative Assembly of the Northwest Territories
- District created: 1894
- District abolished: 1905
- First contested: 1894
- Last contested: 1902

East Calgary was an electoral district in the North-West Territories from 1894 to 1905, which was created when Calgary was split into East and West Calgary.

The two ridings would later be merged to form the new Calgary Alberta provincial electoral district, when Alberta became a province separate from the North-West Territories.

== Election results 1894–1902 ==
1902 North-West Territories general election
Party	Candidate	Votes	%
Independent	John Jackson Young	408	52.04
Liberal–Conservative	Hugh McLeod	352	44.90
Independent	James A. Reilly	24	3.06
Total valid votes		784	100.00

1898 North-West Territories general election
Party	Candidate	Votes	%
Independent	Alfred Cross	182	33.21
Independent	S. J. Clarke	127	23.18
Independent	James A. Reilly	120	21.89
Independent	Joseph Bannerman	119	21.72
Total valid votes		548	100.00

1894 North-West Territories general election
Party	Candidate	Votes	%
Independent	Joseph Bannerman	209	33.55
Independent	S. J. Clarke	190	30.50
Independent	N. J. Lindsay	117	18.77
Independent	Patrick Nolan	57	9.15
Independent	James A. Reilly	50	8.03
Total valid votes		623	100.00

Note:

- North-West Territories is non-partisan except from after the 4th General Election in 1898 to 1905.

== See also ==
- List of Northwest Territories territorial electoral districts
- Canadian provincial electoral districts
- Calgary-East Alberta provincial electoral district
- Calgary East Federal electoral district
- East Calgary Federal electoral district
