= Thomas Alfred Patrick =

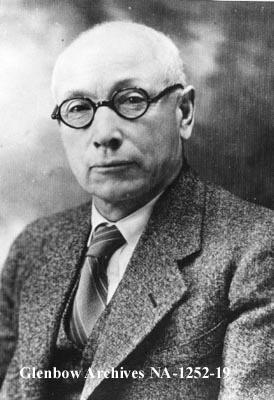
- Patrick in the 1930s.

Member of the North-West Legislative Assembly for Yorkton
- In office 1897–1904
- Preceded by: Fredrik Robert Insinger
- Succeeded by: Thomas Henry Garry

Personal details
- Born: December 23, 1864 Ilderton, Canada West
- Died: September 8, 1943 (aged 78)
- Spouse: Marion Griffith (m. 1890)
- Education: University of Western Ontario
- Occupation: Physician

Thomas Alfred Patrick (December 23, 1864 – September 8, 1943) was a Canadian politician and physician. A doctor residing in Yorkton, he served on the North-West Legislative Assembly for Yorkton from 1897 to 1904.

== Early life ==
Thomas Alfred Patrick was born on December 23, 1864, in Ilderton, Canada West to George Blackall Patrick (1832–1917) and Alicia Hobbs, the oldest of 12 children. He graduated medicine from the University of Western Ontario in 1888 and was a surgery in Saltcoats until 1894, then moved to Yorkton where he practiced until 1939.

== Political life ==
Patrick first contested the 1891 North-West Territories general election in the Wallace electoral district, finishing second to Joel Reaman. Patrick again ran for office in the October 1897 by-election for the Yorkton electoral district and was acclaimed, and in the subsequent 1898 North-West Territories general election, was acclaimed again. In the 1902 North-West Territories general election Patrick defeated J.E. Peake with 408 votes to Peake's 141.

In the Assembly, Patrick was a supporter of the Frederick W. A. G. Haultain government and responsible government for the North-West Territories until 1902 when he disagreed with Haultain's goal of a single large province across the western Prairies. Instead, Patrick envisioned provinces with boundaries similar to the borders that have been adopted for the provinces of Alberta and Saskatchewan. He authored the 1905 book The Five Province Heresy - a Menace to National Unity concerning the issue.

Patrick stepped down from the Assembly in 1904 to run in the 1904 Canadian federal election and bring forward the issue of provincial status for the North-West Territories. Shortly after Patrick accepted the Conservative nomination, Laurier announced that the Dominion government would provide province status to the southern parts of the North-West Territories. Patrick stated that he would not have run if he knew the announcement would occur. Patrick did not win, coming in a distant second in the Mackenzie electoral district to Liberal Edward L. Cash, who was also a doctor in Yorkton.

== Legacy ==
As a practicing physician, Patrick delivered the first child born in the province of Saskatchewan after becoming a province, a few seconds after midnight on September 1, 1905.

In 1898 he compiled the book Facts bearing on the Future of the North-West Territories. Compiled for electors of Yorkton.

In the 1920s Patrick was active in the local activities of the Progressive Party. Partly due to his influence, the party fought for proportional representation, Senate reform and the completion of the Hudson Bay railway.

He authored Our Senate Problem and its Solution [1924?]; and The County System for Saskatchewan [1921?].

Patrick died on September 8, 1943.

Patrick's memoirs were published in 1980 under the title Pioneer of vision : the reminiscences of T.A. Patrick, M.D., with the foreword written by former Prime Minister John G. Diefenbaker. Diefenbaker described Patrick as "one of the greats of the pioneer days in Saskatchewan" and that his "vision and determination" shaped the province of Saskatchewan to the present.
