= Archibald Beaton Gillis =

Canadian politician

Archibald Gillis
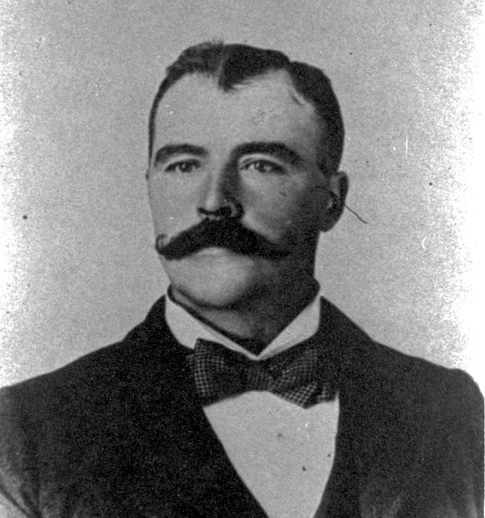

Speaker of the Legislative Assembly of the North-West Territories
- In office 1902–1905
- Preceded by: William Eakin

Personal details
- Born: January 28, 1864 Whycocomagh, Nova Scotia, Canada
- Died: January 18, 1940 (aged 75) Whitewood, Saskatchewan, Canada

Archibald Beaton Gillis (January 28, 1864 – January 18, 1940) was a farmer and political figure in Saskatchewan, Canada. He represented Whitewood in the Legislative Assembly of the Northwest Territories from 1894 to 1904 as a Liberal-Conservative, and Whitewood (and then Pipestone) in the Legislative Assembly of Saskatchewan from 1905 to 1912 as a Provincial Rights (Conservative) member. Gillis sat for Saskatchewan division in the Senate of Canada from 1921 to 1940.

== Background ==
He was born in Whycocomagh, Nova Scotia, the son of Donald Gillis, a native of Scotland. Gillis came to Saskatchewan, then part of the Northwest Territories, in 1880. He was postmaster at Whitewood from 1893 to 1908. He was also president of the Whitewood Trading Company and head of the Whitewood Implement Company. Gillis was Speaker of the Legislative Assembly of the Northwest Territories from 1901 to 1905. He served as lieutenant-colonel in the 217th Battalion, Canadian Expeditionary Force during World War I. In 1914, Gillis married Margaret Lamont. He died in office at the age of 75.

== Election results ==
1894 North-West Territories general election: Whitewood
Party	Candidate	Votes	%
Independent	Archibald Beaton Gillis	300	51.64%
Independent	Walter Claude Thorburn	281	48.36%

1898 North-West Territories general election: Whitewood
Party	Candidate	Votes
Independent	Archibald Beaton Gillis	Acclaimed

1902 North-West Territories general election: Whitewood
Party	Candidate	Votes
Liberal–Conservative	Archibald Beaton Gillis	Acclaimed

1905 Saskatchewan general election: Whitewood
Party	Candidate	Votes	%
Provincial Rights	Archibald Gillis	867	65.24%
Liberal	Archibald Cowan	462	34.76%
Total		1,329	100.00%

1908 Saskatchewan general election: Pipestone
Party	Candidate	Votes	%	±%
Provincial Rights	Archibald Gillis	1,001	64.13%	-1.11
Liberal	James Robinson	560	35.87%	+1.11
Total		1,561	100.00%	

1912 Saskatchewan general election: Pipestone
Party	Candidate	Votes	%	±%
Liberal	Richard James Phin	1,006	50.60%	+14.73
Conservative	Archibald Gillis	982	49.40%	-14.73
Total		1,988	100.00%	
