= John Henry Charles Willoughby =

John Henry Charles Willoughby (July 3, 1861 – May 22, 1940) was a physician, financial broker and political figure in Saskatchewan, Canada. He was mayor of Regina in 1893.

He was born in Cobourg, Canada West, the son of Reverend Nicholas Ramsay Willoughby, and was educated at Upper Canada College, in Peterborough, at Victoria University and the Toronto Medical College. Willoughby practised medicine in Saskatoon and then Regina, later returning to Saskatoon. He also farmed. Willoughby served during the North-West Rebellion. He was editor of the Saskatoon Phoenix and served as a school trustee. He was a member of Regina city council from 1891 to 1892 and from 1894 to 1895 and a member of Saskatoon town council from 1903 to 1904 and from 1907 to 1908. Willoughby also served as president of the Saskatoon Board of Trade. In 1904, he married Helen Gertrude Hilliard. He died in Dundas, Ontario on May 22, 1940.
