= Alfred Wyndham =

British and Canadian army officer

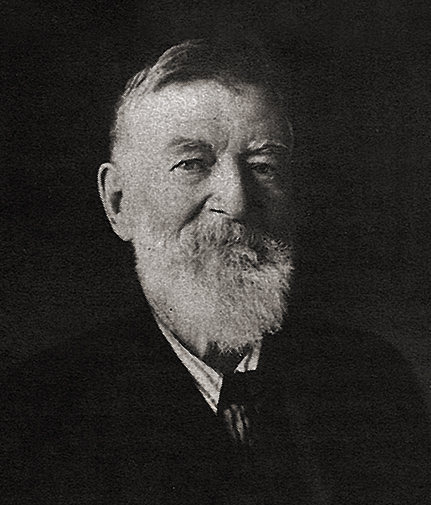
Lt Colonel Alfred Ernest Wyndham, of Dinton Ranch, Alberta, Canada

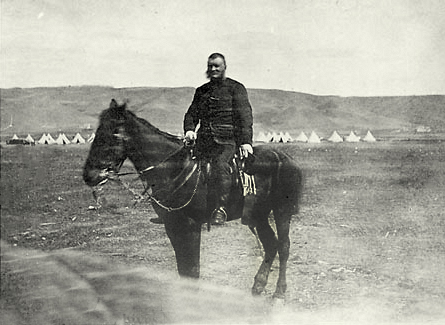
Colonel Arthur Wyndham, commander of the 12th York Rangers, taken at Fort Qu'Appelle at the time of the North-West Rebellion in 1885

Lt-Colonel Alfred Ernest Wyndham (4 November 1836 – 12 March 1914) was a British and Canadian army officer, pioneering rancher in Ontario and Alberta, Canada, and commander of the 12th Regiment, York Rangers at the decisive Battle of Batoche in the North-West Rebellion of 1885.

== Birth and education ==
Alfred Wyndham was the second son of Captain Alexander Wadham Wyndham (d1869) and Emma (née Trevelyan) of West Lodge, Blandford in Dorset. His mother, an accomplished artist, was the daughter of Sir John Trevelyan Bt of Nettlecombe, Somerset. Following his great-uncle Dr Thomas Wyndham (clergyman) and other members of the Wyndham family since the 17th century, he was educated at Sherborne in the Dorset town of that name.

He was brought up at the West Lodge estate in the Cranbourne Chase where hunting became a favourite pastime, and at the family's sporting estate at Burrishoole, co Mayo, Ireland. The Burrishoole estate had been acquired by Captain Wyndham in the 1850s from the Rev John Harvey Ashworth (author of The Saxon in Ireland, Rathlynn and other books), and there he built Burrishoole House which was completed in 1862.

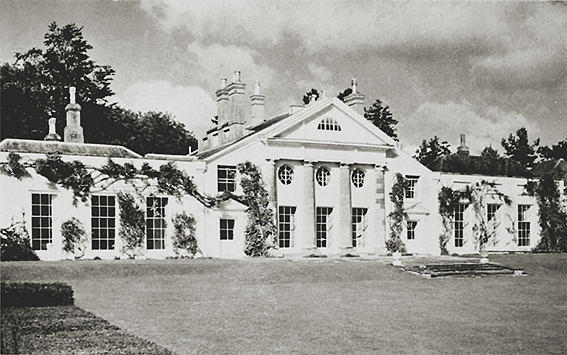
West Lodge, Dorset, where Colonel Alfred Wyndham was born and brought up

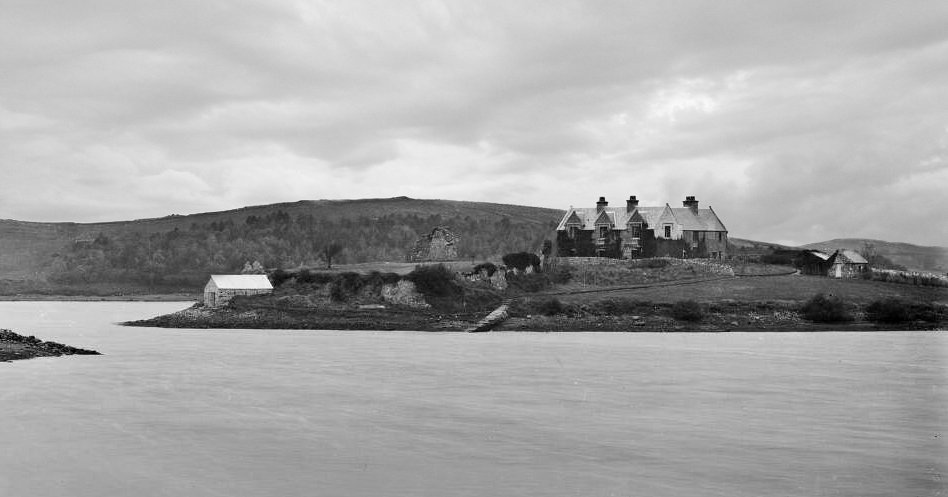
Burrishoole House, county Mayo, Ireland, built by Alfred Wyndham's father, Captain Alexander Wadham Wyndham

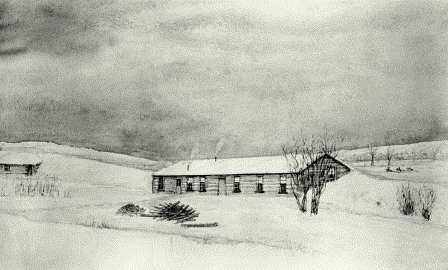
Dinton Ranch, Alberta, Canada, from a painting by Colonel Alfred Wyndham. Mrs Wyndham recorded moving in when the temperature was −20 °F in 1887

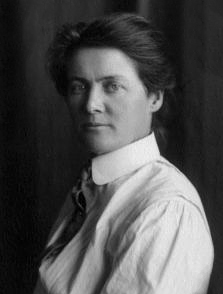
Beatrice Wyndham who inherited her father's political interests and after whom the Beatrice Wyndham Park nature reserve in Okotoks is named.

== Biography ==
Despite being born into one of the most influential and wealthy families in the West Country, Alfred Wyndham's early adult years were riddled with indecision. He left the Royal Naval College, having decided against a career at sea, and in 1855 enlisted as an ensign in the Royal Wiltshire Militia and spent a time on garrison duty in a number of Mediterranean outposts.

In 1858 Wyndham decided to emigrate to British North America and, leaving the Militia, he settled in Simcoe County in southern Ontario, where he became a prominent gentleman farmer with a pretty house on the shore of Lake Simcoe. He contracted a good marriage in the following year, and maintained his military connections by volunteering for the 12th Regiment, York Rangers, a militia regiment. His promotion was steady until in 1882 he was appointed Lt-Colonel commanding the regiment.

Thus it was that at the outbreak of the North-West Rebellion by the Métis people under Louis Riel in 1885, Colonel Wyndham commanded the 12th York Rangers in the field, where he and his regiment were involved in several hard skirmishes with the rebels across Northwest Territories. Colonel Wyndham also led his regiment into the Battle of Batoche where the success of federal government forces resulted in the crushing of the rebellion and the surrender and hanging of Louis Riel. One long-term outcome of this victory was that the Prairie Provinces became controlled by English rather than French speakers.

In leading his regiment across the Northwest Territories, Colonel Wyndham came to admire the wild beauty of Alberta and recognised its agricultural potential. He decided to return west in 1886 and was given a North-West Rebellion script on one quarter, and another quarter of homestead land, at a prime site by the Bow river near Carseland to the south east of Calgary, a combined total of 320 acres. His wife and children followed in 1887, Mrs Wyndham recording in her diary that the family moved into their cottonwood log house at a temperature of 20 °F (−7 °C) below zero. Colonel Wyndham soon became one of the most prominent ranchers in Alberta. He named his ranch Dinton, after his family's ancestral home and estate in Wiltshire, and soon the whole district became known as Dinton, acquiring a post office and an Anglican church dedicated to St Thomas which stands to this day.

Colonel Wyndham remained deeply interested in Territorial politics and ran for the Conservative party in the territorial government in 1898, losing to the Liberal candidate. He maintained a strong interest in political affairs and the pages of the Okotoks Review were often filled with his political commentary on provincial and national events. He was also a talented amateur artist, working mostly in watercolour, and one of his paintings can be found in the Royal Ontario Museum.

Colonel Wyndham has been described as the nearest thing to a squire in Okotoks although his eccentricity was sometimes marked. One of his wife's cousins said of him that he was an honest, true-hearted Christian gentleman, but having come to Canada with a good deal of money, he was of that type who seem to be born with a genius for muddling away wealth. She did concede however that if he lost money, he also won respect and affection, and that long after his death there were many who had cause to bless the name of The dear old Colonel.

== Family ==
A year after arriving in Simcoe County, Wyndham married Caroline Elizabeth, daughter of the prominent Ontario lawyer and politician John Stuart and Elizabeth (née Van Rensellaer Powell). In what was the first divorce in Upper Canada, John Stuart had sued his wife's lover, Lieutenant John Grogan, for adultery in 1839 and won £600 plus costs, forcing Grogan to sell his commission. Royal assent, in the form of An Act for the Relief of John Stuart, was granted in 1841.

Colonel and Mrs Wyndham had eleven children, Alexander (b. 1860), Agnes Stuart (b. 1862), Walter Trevelyan (b. 1864), Emma Ethel (b. 1866), Ernest Alfred (b. 1868), Spencer (b. 1869), Charles Wadham (b. 1872), Beatrice Ida Wyndham (b. 1874), Julia (b. 1876), Mary Sophia (b. 1878), and John Stuart (b. 1880). Most of the boys were educated in England and continued to farm and keep a hand in military service like their father.

Colonel Wyndham's political interests perhaps found the greatest expression in his daughter Beatrice who, in 1919, became the first woman ever elected to public office in Okotoks. She served on the Okotoks School Board for 12 years, on the Okotoks Agricultural Society's fair board, volunteered with the Red Cross, was a member of the St. Peter's Anglican Church women's auxiliary and the Okotoks Book Club; altogether a tireless community worker. She was also an avid curler with the Wild Cat Team, a fitting name for a tenacious woman who was not afraid to stand up for her beliefs. The Beatrice Wyndham Park, a nature reserve and bird sanctuary in Okotoks, is named after her.

Colonel Arthur Wyndham died on 10 March 1914 at the age 79, and was buried at Okotoks, Alberta.
