= George W. Brown (Saskatchewan politician) =

Canadian politician

The Honourable George William Brown
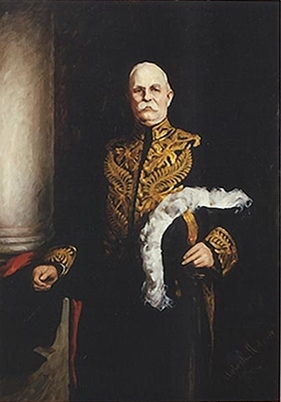

2nd Lieutenant Governor of Saskatchewan
- In office October 5, 1910 – October 6, 1915
- Monarch: George V
- Governors General: The Earl Grey; The Duke of Connaught and Strathearn
- Premier: Thomas Walter Scott
- Preceded by: Amédée E. Forget
- Succeeded by: Richard Stuart Lake

Member of the North-West Legislative Assembly for North Regina
- In office October 31, 1894 – June 9, 1903
- Preceded by: David Jelly
- Succeeded by: District abolished

Personal details
- Born: May 30, 1860 Holstein, Grey County, Canada West
- Died: February 17, 1919 (aged 58) Regina, Saskatchewan, Canada
- Party: Liberal-Conservative
- Spouse: Annie Gardner Barr
- Children: Beatrice Annie (b. 1897); Gordon Barr (b. 1901)

George William Brown (May 30, 1860 – February 17, 1919) was a Canadian politician and the second lieutenant governor of Saskatchewan from 1910 to 1915.

He was elected to the 3rd North-West Legislative Assembly, 4th North-West Legislative Assembly, and 5th North-West Legislative Assembly in the electoral division of North Regina.
