= Donald H. McDonald =

Canadian politician

Donald Hogarth McDonald (January 11, 1867 – 1928) was a Canadian politician.

Born in 1867 in Qu'Appelle, Rupert's Land (now Saskatchewan) Donald was first elected to the North-West Territories Legislature in an 1896 by-election, he was re-elected for 2 more terms until 1905.

In the 1902 North-West Territories election McDonald became leader of the Northwest Territories Liberal Party, and served as leader of the official opposition during the 5th North-West Legislative Assembly. He came out of retirement during the 1921 Saskatchewan general election and was elected as an Independent member for South Qu'Appelle to the Legislative Assembly of Saskatchewan. He served one term and was defeated by Anton Huck in 1925.

Preceded by William Sutherland	MLA North Qu'Appelle, NWT; 1886-1905	Succeeded by District Abolished
Preceded by Joseph Glenn	MLA South Qu'Appelle, SK; 1921-1925	Succeeded by Anton Huck
