= Richard Alfred Wallace =

Canadian politician

Richard Alfred Wallace (June 3, 1861 – March 12, 1935) was a Canadian teacher, cook, farmer and politician on the municipal and territorial level.

Wallace ran in his first election in the 1898 Northwest Territories general election. He defeated four other candidates in a closely contested election winning just over 38% of the vote to capture the High River electoral district.

He was re-elected with nearly 70% of the vote in the 1902 Northwest Territories general election.

He ran for re-election in 1905 but was not successful.

Legislative Assembly of the Northwest Territories
Preceded by John Lineham	MLA High River; 1894-1898	Succeeded by District Abolished
