= Macleod (territorial electoral district) =

Former territorial electoral district in the North-West Territories, Canada

Macleod was a territorial electoral district for the Legislative Assembly of the North-West Territories, Canada. The riding was created by royal proclamation in 1885 and abolished in 1905 when the provinces of Alberta and Saskatchewan were created.

== Members of the Legislative Assembly (MLAs) ==
Name	Elected	Left office
Richard Henry Boyle	September 15, 1885	August 10, 1887
Frederick Haultain	1887	1905

== Election results ==
=== 1885 ===
1885 North-West Territories election
Name	Vote	%
Richard Henry Boyle	130	65.99%
George C. Ives	67	34.01%
Total votes	197	100%

=== 1887 by-election ===
September 5, 1887 by-election
Name	Vote	%
Frederick Haultain	130	65.99%
Charles Conybeare	67	34.01%
Total votes	197	100%

The by-election was held after Viscount Richard Henry Boyle resigned his seat.

=== 1888 ===
1888 North-West Territories general election
Name	Vote	%
Frederick Haultain	Acclaimed	

=== 1891 ===
1891 North-West Territories general election
Name	Vote	%
Frederick Haultain	Acclaimed	

=== 1894 ===
1894 North-West Territories general election
Name	Vote	%
Frederick Haultain	Acclaimed	

=== 1897 ===
October 26, 1897 by-election
Name	Vote	%
Frederick Haultain	Acclaimed	

By-election was held to confirm Mr. Haultain to his appointment as Premier of the North-West Territories

=== 1898 ===
1898 Northwest Territories general election
Name	Vote	%
Frederick Haultain	Acclaimed	

=== 1902 ===
1902 Northwest Territories election
Name	Vote	%
Frederick Haultain	477	70.56%
Charles F. Harris	199	29.44%
Total votes	676	100%

== See also ==
- List of Northwest Territories territorial electoral districts
- Canadian provincial electoral districts
