= William Henry Sinclair =

Canadian politician

Member of the Legislative Assembly of the Northwest Territories for Saskatoon
- In office 1902 – September 27, 1902

Personal details
- Born: February 8, 1864 Canada West
- Died: September 27, 1902 (aged 38) Saskatoon, North-West Territories
- Party: Independent

William Henry Sinclair (February 8, 1864 – September 27, 1902) was a Canadian politician. He served on the Legislative Assembly of the Northwest Territories for Saskatoon in 1902.

He was elected in 1902 to the Legislative Assembly of the Northwest Territories, and served until his death on September 27, 1902, in a hunting accident which he accidentally shot himself while stowing his gun away.

== Electoral results ==
=== 1902 election ===
May 21, 1902 election
Name	Vote	%
William Henry Sinclair	239	72.42%
James Leslie	91	27.58%
Total Votes	330	100%
