= Alfred Ernest Cross =

Canadian politician (1861–1932)

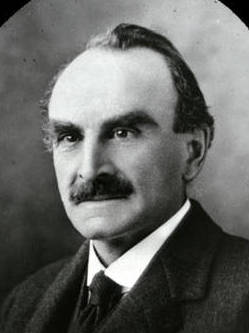

Member of the Legislative Assembly of the Northwest Territories
- In office 1898–1902
- Constituency: East Calgary

Personal details
- Born: June 26, 1861 Montreal, Canada East
- Died: March 10, 1932 (aged 70) Alberta, Canada
- Spouse: Helen Rothney MacLeod (m. 1899)
- Occupation: politician, rancher, brewer

Alfred Ernest Cross (June 26, 1861 – March 10, 1932) was a Canadian politician, rancher and brewer, known as one of the Big Four who founded the Calgary Stampede in 1912.

== Early life ==
Born in Montreal, Cross was the oldest of seven children. He trained as a veterinary surgeon.

Cross moved to Alberta in 1884 to work at a ranch near what is now Cochrane, Alberta owned by Matthew Henry Cochrane.

In 1899 he married Helen Rothney Macleod (1878-1959), the daughter of North-west Mounted Police Commissioner Colonel James Macleod, who gave Calgary its name.

== Business ==
By 1886 Cross owned his own ranch, the A7 Ranche, located near what is now Nanton, Alberta.

Cross returned to Montreal for hospital treatment for appendicitis. He returned to Calgary in 1891 holding a diploma that he had been trained as a brewer's apprentice and established the Calgary Brewing and Malting Company, the first brewery in what was then the Northwest Territories.

== Ranchmen's Club ==
That same year Calgary's oldest and most exclusive club, the Ranchmen's Club, was established; and A.E. Cross was a founding member.

== Politics ==
In 1898, Cross entered politics, and was elected as a Member of the Legislative Assembly (MLA) for East Calgary.

Cross was active in community affairs, serving as a director and president of Calgary General Hospital, as president of the Alberta Exhibition Association, and as president of the Calgary Board of Trade (now Calgary Chamber of Commerce) in 1909.

== Calgary Stampede ==
In the summer of 1912, Cross, along with Patrick Burns, George Lane, and Archie McLean ("The Big Four") put up the combined amount of $100,000 to finance the first Calgary Stampede held in September 1912

== Legacy ==
Cross died in 1932. The following have been dedicated in his name:

- A.E. Cross Junior High School located in Calgary, Alberta.
- The Big Four Building at the Stampede Grounds in Calgary, Alberta.

A.E. Cross' original house in Calgary, located in the community of Inglewood, is the location of Rouge Restaurant.
