= High River (territorial electoral district) =

Former territorial electoral district in the North-West Territories, Canada

High River was a single member territorial electoral district in the Northwest Territories, Canada, that elected members to the Legislative Assembly of the Northwest Territories from 1894 until 1905.

== Electoral history ==
The electoral district was created under the revised North-West Representation Act that was passed through the Parliament of Canada in 1894. The electoral district was created out of the old Calgary electoral district to meet the requirement of 2,500 residents per electoral district as outlined in the North-West Territories Act.

After Alberta and Saskatchewan were created, the electoral district was abolished in 1905. A new High River district was created to elect members to the Legislative Assembly of Alberta.

== Members of the Legislative Assembly (MLAs) ==
Name	Elected	Left office
John Lineham	1894	1898
Richard Alfred Wallace	1898	1905

== Election results ==
=== 1894 ===
1894 North-West Territories general election
Name	Vote	%
John Lineham	328	76.82%
Frederick James Boswell	99	23.18%
Total votes	427	100%

=== 1898 ===
1898 North-West Territories general election
Name	Vote	%
Richard Alfred Wallace	176	38.51%
Albert Edward Banister	126	27.57%
Walter C. Skrine	114	24.95%
Alfred Wyndham	37	8.10%
Alexander Begg	4	0.87%
Total votes	457	100%

=== 1902 ===
1902 North-West Territories general election
Name	Vote	%
Richard Alfred Wallace	249	69.55%
George Hoadley	109	30.45%
Total votes	358	100%

== See also ==
- List of Northwest Territories territorial electoral districts
- Canadian provincial electoral districts
