= William Elliott (Saskatchewan politician) =

Canadian politician

William Elliott (1863 – October 29, 1934) was a physician and political figure in Saskatchewan, Canada. He represented Wolseley from 1905 to 1908 and Moose Mountain from 1908 to 1912 in the Legislative Assembly of Saskatchewan as a Provincial Rights Party member.

He was born in Mitchell, Canada West, to James Elliott and Eleanor Durin, and was educated there and at the University of Toronto medical college. In 1893, Elliott settled in Wolseley, Saskatchewan. He married Margaret Jane Carter in 1896. He was elected to the Legislative Assembly of the Northwest Territories in 1898 and 1902. Elliott served in the executive council for the Territories as Minister of Agriculture. He was defeated when he ran for reelection to the Saskatchewan assembly in 1912 and 1917. Elliott died at home in Wolseley at the age of 71 following a heart attack.

Elliott Falls in Saskatchewan was named in his honour.
