= Thomas McKay (Northwest Territories politician) =

Canadian politician

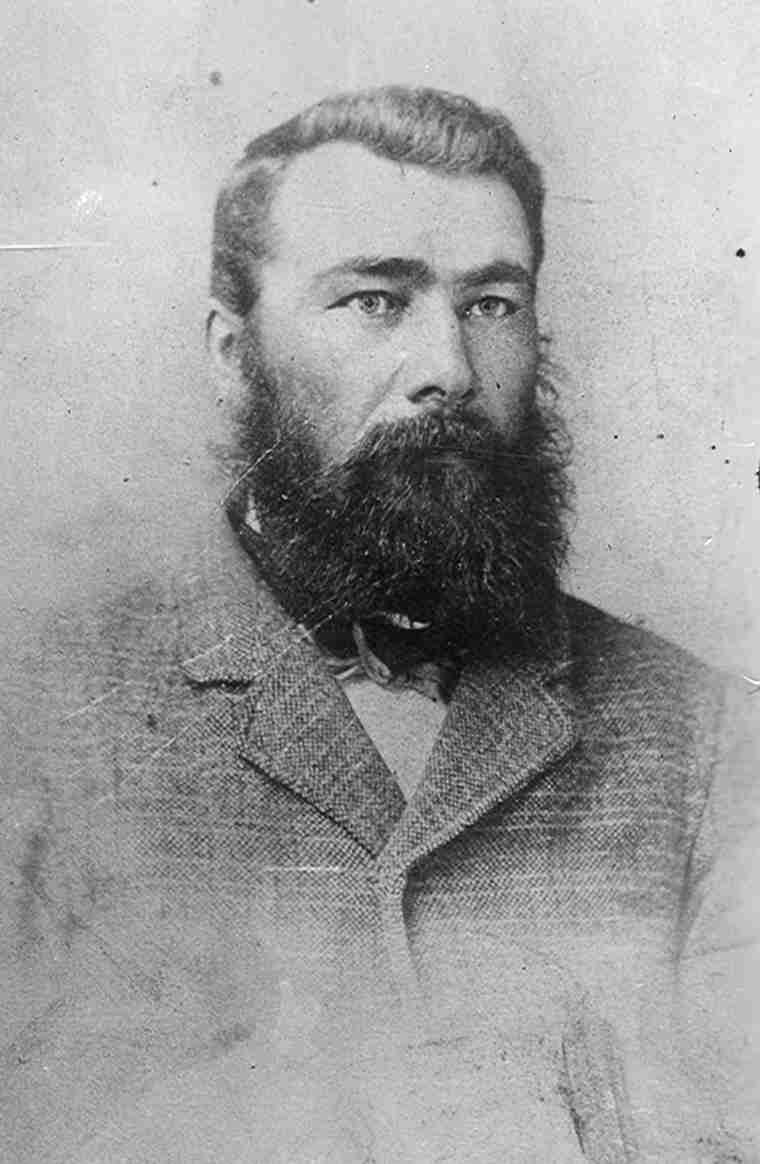

Member of the North-West Legislative Assembly for Prince Albert
- In office 1891–1894
- In office 1898–1905

Mayor of Prince Albert

Personal details
- Born: July 4, 1849 Fort Pelly
- Died: September 25, 1924 (aged 75)
- Spouse: Catherine McBeath (m. 1873)

Thomas McKay (July 4, 1849 – September 25, 1924) was a Metis farmer and political figure in Saskatchewan, Canada. He was the first mayor of Prince Albert, Saskatchewan, and represented Prince Albert in the Legislative Assembly of the North-West Territories from 1891 to 1894 and from 1898 to 1905.

McKay was the brother-in-law of Lawrence Clarke, and like Clarke was connected to the Conservative Party of Canada. A Protestant Métis or Anglo-Metis individual, McKay was involved in the 1885 North-West Rebellion on the side of the federal government. He was one of the first 40 men to volunteer to help Major Crozier of the North-West Mounted Police. He served as an envoy to negotiate with Métis at Duck Lake. He also operated as a scout, relaying messages between Major Crozier and Colonel Irving. His brother James McKay served with C Company of the Winnipeg Rifles during the 1885 Rebellion.

== Personal life ==
He was born on 4 July 1849 in Fort Pelly, the son of William McKay and Mary Cook, and the brother of James McKay. He was educated at St. John's School in the Red River settlement (today's Winnipeg). McKay worked as a clerk for the Hudson's Bay Company from 1864 to 1873, when he settled in Prince Albert. In 1873, he married Catherine McBeath.

McKay is buried at the Royal Anglican cemetery on Royal Road south of Prince Albert.

== Political career ==
In 1885, McKay became the first mayor of Prince Albert, Saskatchewan. From 1891 to 1894 and from 1898 to 1905, he represented Prince Albert in the Legislative Assembly of the Northwest Territories. (He did not run for reelection in 1894 and was defeated in an 1897 by-election.)

He also ran unsuccessfully for the Conservative Party in the federal election of 1904 for the riding of Saskatchewan when he was defeated by Liberal John Lamont.
