= William Frederick Meyers =

Canadian politician

Member of the Legislative Assembly of the Northwest Territories for Kinistino
- In office November 1891 – 1905
- Preceded by: James Hoey
- Succeeded by: none

Personal details
- Born: September 3, 1848 Trenton, Canada West
- Died: 1912 Kinistino, Saskatchewan
- Party: Independent

William Frederick Meyers (September 3, 1848 – 1912) was a Canadian politician. He served on the Legislative Assembly of the Northwest Territories for Kinistino from 1891 to 1905.

Meyers was a native of Trenton, Ontario. A member of the Church of England, he was a farmer and rancher. Though he was politically affiliated with the Conservative Party of Canada, he was opposed to partisanship in the Legislative Assembly.

He was elected in 1891 to the Legislative Assembly of the Northwest Territories, and served until the dissolution of the legislature in 1905 when the territory was split into Alberta and Saskatchewan.

== Electoral results ==
=== 1891 election ===
November 7, 1891 election
Name	Vote	%
William Frederick Meyers	32	52.46%
George Ellis	29	47.54%
Total Votes	61	100%

=== 1894 election ===
October 31, 1894 election
Name	Vote	%
William Frederick Meyers	60	51.28%
James Tennant	57	48.72%
Total Votes	117	100%

=== 1898 election ===
November 4, 1898 election
Name	Vote	%
William Frederick Meyers	98	65.77%
Thomas Sanderson	51	32.23%
Total Votes	149	100%

=== 1902 election ===
May 21, 1902 election
Name	Vote	%
William Frederick Meyers	425	62.32%
Alfred Schmitz Shadd	257	37.68%
Total Votes	682	100%
