= Yorkton (territorial electoral district) =

Former electoral district in the North-West Territories, Canada

Yorkton was a territorial electoral district in the North-West Territories from 1894 to 1905, After 1905 when Saskatchewan split from the territories, the district of Yorkton continues to exist to present day.

The riding was named after the city of Yorkton, Saskatchewan.

== Election results ==
Yorkton elected members to the Legislative Assembly of the North-West Territories from 1894 to 1902. The members it elected were:

- October 31, 1894 — Fredrik Robert Insinger
- November 4, 1898 — Thomas Alfred Patrick
- May 21, 1902 — Thomas Alfred Patrick

== See also ==
- List of Northwest Territories territorial electoral districts
- Canadian provincial electoral districts
- Yorkton (provincial electoral district)
- Yorkton (federal electoral district)
