= North-West Territories Liberal-Conservative Party =

Territorial political party in Canada

- Former territorial party
- Leader: Frederick Haultain
- President: Thomas Tweed
- Founded: 1897
- Dissolved: September 1, 1905
- Succeeded by: Conservative Party of Alberta; Provincial Rights Party
- Ideology: Conservatism
- Colours: Blue

The North-West Territories Liberal-Conservative Party also known formally as the Liberal-Conservative Association prior to 1903 and the Territorial Conservative Association after 1903, was a short lived political party in the Northwest Territories, Canada. The party was active between 1897 and 1905. It was a branch of the federal Conservative Party of Canada.

== The founding of the party ==
The Liberal-Conservatives formed government in October 1897, when Lieutenant Governor Charles H. Mackintosh returned to North-West Territories to enforce the new laws in the North-West Territories Act that gave new powers to the territories. It was speculated that Robert Brett was plotting to form a Conservative led Government backed by a majority coalition of MLAs in the Legislative Assembly of Northwest Territories. Members answered in the media and denied there was a plot. Mackintosh would stick with his original plan of asking Frederick Haultain who was already chairman of the executive committee to form the government, leaving Robert Brett to form the Official opposition of the Northwest Territories Liberal Party and oppose the Haultain administration as he had done so since 1891.

The influence and popularity of Premier Haultain helped him build his coalition of lawmakers in the Legislative Assembly. The party was formed as a consequence of executive powers being released to elected members from the Lieutenant Governor that had been held since 1870. The beginning of party politics in the territories sparked controversy and was not done through any Grass roots movement or formed on traditional ideological lines, and was done by Haultain in such a way that there was very little visibility to the public until years later after the party system began to mature.

Haultain's first appointment to his executive council was a Liberal by the name of James Hamilton Ross. Haultain led a large cabinet into the 4th Northwest Territories general election in 1898. Only Haultain and Ross held portfolios while the rest of the ministers did not. The government became widely known as the Haultain-Ross government.

== 4th general election ==
The party swept the 1898 general election with a large majority.

== 5th general election ==
It went on to win the 1902 election with a reduced majority. The party itself had little visibility as Haultain abhorred Dominion party lines and did not wish to promote it. He believed in the consensus model of government, and wanted it for all provinces and territories.

After the election of 1898, Haultain appointed two Liberals and one Conservative to his cabinet. Liberal-Conservative party members accused Haultain's government of being a "Grit hive". To appease party supporters, he subsequently appointed two Conservatives and one Liberal.

== 1903 Moose Jaw Convention ==
A large convention was held on 26 March 1903 in Moose Jaw. The convention attracted delegates from all parts of the populated Northwest Territories, some travelled more than 700 miles to make the journey. The convention attracted a large number of federal Conservative Members of Parliament and Conservative Senators.

The convention laid out a formal structure to the party for the first time, as well as setting creating a policy book and putting together an executive council to operate outside of the legislature. The main focus of the party was to put together a coherent policy which the party previously lacked and is thought to have led to the decline in seats for the Liberal-Conservative government.

Among the policy resolutions put forward and adopted was provincial rights, better conditions for settlers, and electoral reform in the creation of an enumerated voters list. The delegates voted to run the party banner in the next territorial election, and that includes contested nominations. One delegate stated in an interview to the Calgary Herald, if the Liberals don't want to address the provincial autonomy Robert Borden was also congratulated on becoming leader of the federal Conservative party to run for Prime Minister of Canada.

The Liberal party was also heavily attacked during the convention, with two different motions condemning them for corrupt electoral practice, and following the federal Liberal Party of Canada policy on the question of provincial powers, and labor laws for the Territories.

Premier Haultain was shocked by the convention and openly opposed the move towards defining the political lines in the legislature. The organizers of the convention planned the election of officers without Haultain's knowledge.

The great Moose Jaw convention stands to this day as the largest political gathering in Northwest Territories history.

== The 5th Legislature ==
From 1903 to 1905, there were three short sittings in the Legislative Assembly. The bulk of the Legislation moved by the Liberal-Conservative government was minor and had to do with incorporating organizations and communities and concurring municipal by-laws.

The remainder of the time was spent lobbying the federal government for more resources to deal with the huge influx of settlers to the territories. Haultain personally clashed with Wilfrid Laurier to settle the provincial rights question.

The last session of the legislature ended in October 1904 and would not be held again in the territories until 1921. Premier Haultain spent the early part of 1905 meeting with the federal government to work out an arrangement to settle provincial autonomy.

After the arrangement of creating Alberta and Saskatchewan were passed in the federal parliament. The party in its last months held nominations and began working on plans to prepare for the new elections in Saskatchewan and Alberta. On August 31, 1905, the 5th North-West Legislative Assembly was dissolved along with the Association and party politics in the Territories came to an end.

In September 1905, provinces of Alberta and Saskatchewan were created out of the more heavily populated, southern regions of the Northwest Territories. Party members then joined the Alberta Conservative Party, and the Provincial Rights Party in Saskatchewan. Many members, including some Members of the Legislative Assembly (MLAs) defected to the Alberta Liberal Party and Saskatchewan Liberal Party, draining the Conservative parties of manpower and experienced politicians.

There was a lot of anger among remaining Conservatives at Sir Wilfrid Laurier and the Liberals for passing over Haultain and appointing Liberal members to form government in both provinces. Laurier also appointed Liberal Party supporters to draw up the new electoral boundaries, which consequently were said to favour Liberal candidates.

== Party executive ==
No formal executive party structure aside from the Executive Council of the Haultain Government is known to exist prior to 1897; officers of the party were first elected in 1903.

- Party leader: Frederick Haultain (1897–1905)
- President: Thomas Tweed (1903-1905)
- Honorary President: Frederick Haultain (1903–1905)
- First Vice President: T.C. Spence (1903-1905)
- Second Vice President: William Carlos Ives (1903-1905)
- Alberta Region: Richard Bennett (1903-1905)
- Assiniboia Region: Dr. Creamer (1903-1905)
- Saskatchewan Region: Thomas McKay (1903-1905)
- Western Assiniboia Region: George Annable (1903-1905)

== See also ==
- List of Northwest Territories political parties
- Alberta Conservative Party
- Saskatchewan Conservative Party
