= Frederick W. A. G. Haultain =

Canadian politician (1857–1942)

Sir Frederick W. A. G. Haultain
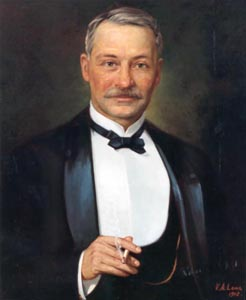
- 1916 painting by V.A. Long

1st Premier of the North-West Territories
- In office October 7, 1897 – September 1, 1905
- Lieutenant Governor: Charles H. Mackintosh; Malcolm Colin Cameron; Amédée E. Forget
- Preceded by: office created
- Succeeded by: George Braden (1980)

Chairman of the Executive Committee
- In office November 7, 1891 – August 1, 1892
- Monarch: Victoria
- Lieutenant Governor: Joseph Royal; Charles H. Mackintosh
- Preceded by: Robert Brett
- Succeeded by: Hugh Cayley
- In office December 1, 1892 – October 7, 1897
- Monarch: Victoria
- Lieutenant Governor: Charles H. Mackintosh
- Preceded by: Hugh Cayley
- Succeeded by: himself as Premier of the North-West Territories

MLA for Macleod
- In office September 5, 1887 – September 1, 1905
- Preceded by: Richard Henry Boyle
- Succeeded by: District abolished

Member of the Legislative Assembly of Saskatchewan for Lumsden
- In office December 13, 1905 – July 11, 1912
- Preceded by: none
- Succeeded by: Joseph Glenn

Chief Justice of the Saskatchewan Court of Appeal
- In office 1912–1938
- Preceded by: E. L. Wetmore
- Succeeded by: William F. A. Turgeon

1st Leader of the Opposition of Saskatchewan
- In office March 29, 1906 – June 15, 1912
- Preceded by: none
- Succeeded by: Wellington Willoughby

Personal details
- Born: Frederick William Alpin Gordon Haultain; November 25, 1857 Woolwich, London, England
- Died: January 30, 1942 (aged 84) Montreal, Quebec, Canada
- Resting place: Memorial Gates (University of Saskatchewan); 52°7′45.7″N 106°38′34.5″W
- Party: Liberal-Conservative 1897–1905 Provincial Rights Party 1905–1912
- Spouse: Marion St Clair Castellain née Mackintosh
- Education: University of Toronto; Osgoode Hall

Sir Frederick William Alpin Gordon Haultain (November 25, 1857 – January 30, 1942) was a lawyer and a long-serving Canadian politician and judge. His career in legislatures of the North-West Territories and Saskatchewan stretched into four decades. He served as the first premier of the North-West Territories from 1897 to 1905 and is recognized as having a significant contribution towards the creation of the provinces of Alberta and Saskatchewan. From 1905 on he served as Leader of the Official Opposition in Saskatchewan as well as leader of the Provincial Rights Party. His legislative career ended when he was appointed to the judiciary in 1912.

== Early life ==
He was born in Woolwich, England in 1857, the son of Frederick W. Haultain (1821–1882) and Lucinde Helen Gordon (1828–1915), and came to Peterborough, Canada West, with his family in 1860. He grew up in Peterborough and Montreal, where he was educated at the High School of Montreal, later receiving a Bachelor of Arts from the University of Toronto. He later studied law at Osgoode Hall and was called to the bar in Ontario in 1882 and in the North-West Territories in 1884.

== North-West territorial politics ==
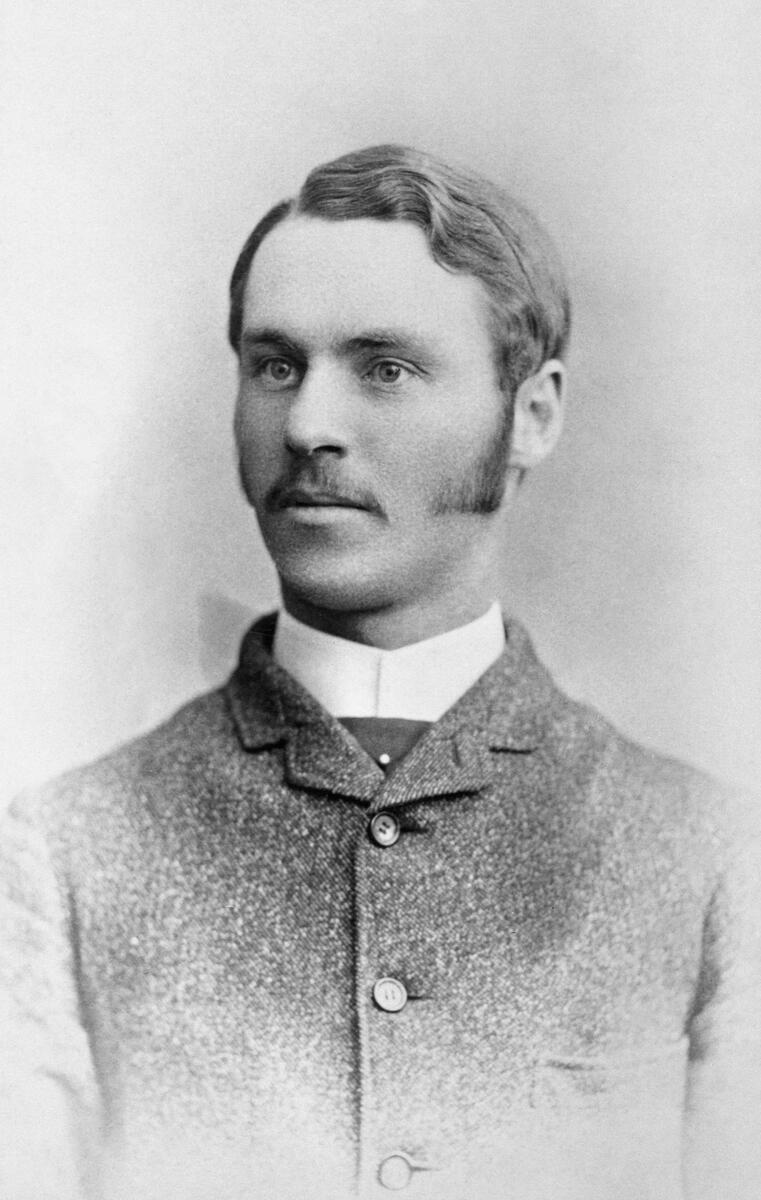
Haultain in 1884

In 1884, Haultain opened a law practice in Fort Macleod. He also served as Crown prosecutor there for several years, and also was an editor for newspapers in Fort Macleod and Lethbridge. Haultain was elected to the Legislative Assembly of the North-West Territories in a by-election held on September 5, 1887. He defeated Charles Conybeare by a large margin. Representing the electoral district of Macleod in the North-West Territorial Council from 1887 to 1888. Haultain won his next five elections by acclamation.

The editor of the Calgary Herald once wrote of him saying that "He is a man of academic training and large, clear perception; straightforward and manly even towards his enemies. In some respects, he is the most finished debater ever heard on a Western platform, arraying his Facts in crisp, clear-cut sentences, and then pressing home his argument with logic and Force?"

=== Premier ===
Haultain was appointed premier of the North-West Territories on October 7, 1897. Haultain also served as Attorney General and Commissioner of Education. As premier, Haultain led negotiations for the granting of provincial status. He argued for Alberta and Saskatchewan to be admitted as a single province named Buffalo, and wanted the new province to be governed by non-partisan governments. The federal Liberal government of Sir Wilfrid Laurier, however, decided against such a large province and favoured creating two provinces, Alberta and Saskatchewan, which eventually happened in 1905.

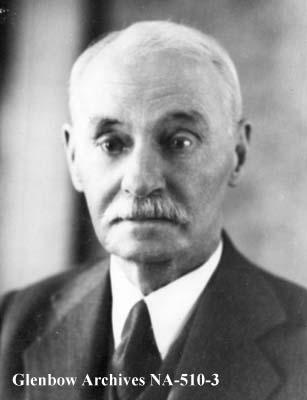
Haultain in 1941

Frustrated in negotiations with the federal Liberal government, Haultain increasingly identified with the Conservative Party and campaigned for it in the 1904 federal election. Laurier's Liberals were re-elected to a majority of seats in the House of Commons, and took two seats in the Alberta district, Conservative party candidates taking the other two.

== Saskatchewan politics ==
After Alberta and Saskatchewan became provinces in 1905, Haultain chose to be active in Saskatchewan. He led the Saskatchewan Provincial Rights Party in the 1905 Saskatchewan provincial election, which was won by the Liberal Party of Saskatchewan. From 1905 to 1912, Haultain sat in the Legislative Assembly of Saskatchewan as leader of the Opposition.

== Later life ==
In 1912, the newly elected Conservative federal government of Sir Robert Borden made Haultain Chief Justice of Saskatchewan's superior court. Haultain was knighted in 1916. The next year, he became Chief Justice of the Saskatchewan Court of Appeal, a position that he held until his retirement in 1938.

Haultain died on January 30, 1942, at Montreal.

== Bibliography ==
- Perry, Sandra E.; Craig, Jessica J. (2006). The Mantle of Leadership : Premiers of the Northwest Territories and Alberta. Edmonton, Alberta: Legislative Assembly of Alberta. ISBN 0-9689217-2-8.
- Spencer, Dick (2007). Singing the Blues: The Conservatives in Saskatchewan. University of Regina; Canadian Plains Research Center. ISBN 978-0-88977-206-9. OCLC 76481167.
- "The Honourable Sir Frederick W.A.G. Haultain, 1897–1905". Legislative Assembly of Alberta library. Archived from the original on 2013-04-22.
- "Sir Frederick William Alpin Gordon Haultain". Canadian Confederation, people. Library and Archives Canada. 2005.

Legislative Assembly of Saskatchewan
Preceded by New District	MLA South Qu'Appelle; 1905–1912	Succeeded by Joseph Glenn
Legal offices
Preceded by Edward Ludlow Wetmore	Chief Justice of Saskatchewan; 1912–1938	Succeeded by William Ferdinand Alphonse Turgeon
Academic offices
Preceded by Edward L. Wetmore	Chancellor of the University of Saskatchewan; 1917–1940	Succeeded by P. E. MacKenzie
