= List of Northwest Territories by-elections =

The list of Northwest Territories by-elections includes every by-election held in the Canadian territory of the Northwest Territories. By-elections occur whenever there is a vacancy in the Legislative Assembly, although an imminent general election may allow the vacancy to remain until the dissolution of the legislative assembly. Incumbent members were required to recontest their seats upon being appointed to Cabinet. Nearly all of these Ministerial by-elections were uncontested.

== 19th Northwest Territories Legislative Assembly 2019–2023 ==
By-election	Date	Incumbent	Party	Winner	Party	Cause	Retained
Tu Nedhé-Wiilideh	February 8, 2022	Steve Norn	Non-partisan consensus government	Richard Edjericon	Non-partisan consensus government	Expulsion	Yes
Monfwi	July 27, 2021	Jackson Lafferty	Non-partisan consensus government	Jane Weyallon Armstrong	Non-partisan consensus government	Resignation	Yes

== 15th Northwest Territories Legislative Assembly 2003–2007 ==
By-election	Date	Incumbent	Party	Winner	Party	Cause	Retained
North Slave	July 18, 2005	Henry Zoe	Non-partisan consensus government	Jackson Lafferty	Non-partisan consensus government	Resignation	Yes
Inuvik Twin Lakes	July 18, 2004	Roger Allen	Non-partisan consensus government	Robert C. McLeod	Non-partisan consensus government	Resignation	Yes

== 9th Northwest Territories Legislative Assembly 1979–1983 ==
By-election	Date	Incumbent	Party	Winner	Party	Cause	Retained
Baffin Central	September 15, 1980	James Arreak	Non-partisan consensus government	Ipeelee Kilabuk	Non-partisan consensus government	Resignation	No

== 8th Northwest Territories Legislative Assembly 1975–1979 ==
By-election	Date	Incumbent	Party	Winner	Party	Cause	Retained
Mackenzie–Great Bear	June 14, 1976	George Barnaby	Non-partisan consensus government	Peter Fraser	Non-partisan consensus government	Resignation	Yes
Great Slave Lake	June 9, 1976†	James Wah-Shee	Non-partisan consensus government	Richard D. J. Whitford	Non-partisan consensus government	Resignation	No

† Won by acclamation; this date is the date of the return of the writ.

== 6th Northwest Territories Legislative Council 1967–1970 ==
By-election	Date	Incumbent	Party	Winner	Party	Cause	Retained
Mackenzie River	January 2, 1969	Bill Berg	Non-partisan consensus government	Mark Duane Fairbrother	Non-partisan consensus government	Death	No

== 5th Northwest Territories Legislative Council 1964–1967 ==
By-election	Date	Incumbent	Party		Winner	Party	Cause	Retained
Eastern Arctic	September 19, 1966	District created	—N/a	—N/a	Simonie Michael	Non-partisan consensus government	New electoral district	Yes
Central Arctic	July 14, 1966†	District created	—N/a	—N/a	Duncan Pryde	Non-partisan consensus government	New electoral district	Yes
Keewatin	July 14, 1966†	District created	—N/a	—N/a	Robert Williamson	Non-partisan consensus government	New electoral district	Yes

† Won by acclamation; this date is the date of the return of the writ.

== 4th Northwest Territories Legislative Council 1960–1964 ==
By-election	Date	Incumbent	Party	Winner	Party	Cause	Retained
Mackenzie South	July 23, 1962	Ayliffe "Pat" Carey	Non-partisan consensus government	Paul William Kaeser	Non-partisan consensus government	Resignation	No

== 3rd Northwest Territories Legislative Council 1957–1960 ==
By-election	Date	Incumbent	Party	Winner	Party	Cause	Retained
Mackenzie North	October 5, 1959†	John Goodall	Non-partisan consensus government	Ernest James "Scotty" Gall	Non-partisan consensus government	Unknown	Yes

† Won by acclamation; this date is the date of the return of the writ.

== 5th North-West Legislative Assembly 1902–1905 ==
By-election	Date	Incumbent	Party	Winner	Party	Cause	Retained
St. Albert	June 9, 1903	Daniel Maloney	Independent	Louis Joseph Alphonse Lambert	Independent	Unseated due to bribery	No
Wolseley	February 18, 1903†	William Elliott	Independent	William Elliott	Independent	Unknown	Yes
Banff	February 4, 1903	Arthur Sifton	Liberal-Conservative	Charles W. Fisher	Liberal	Resignation	Yes
Saskatoon	December 9, 1902	William Henry Sinclair	Independent	James Clinkskill	Independent	Unknown	No

† Won by acclamation; this date is the date of the return of the writ.

== 4th North-West Legislative Assembly 1898–1902 ==
By-election	Date	Incumbent	Party	Winner	Party	Cause	Retained
Banff	March 22, 1901†	Arthur Sifton	Liberal-Conservative	Arthur Sifton	Liberal-Conservative	Ministerial appointment	Yes
Grenfell	March 22, 1901	Richard Stuart Lake	Liberal-Conservative	Richard Stuart Lake	Liberal-Conservative	Sought re-election after failing to enter federal politics	Yes
Moose Jaw	March 22, 1901	James Hamilton Ross	Independent	George Malcolm Annable	Independent	Unknown	Yes
West Calgary	March 22, 1901	R. B. Bennett	Independent	R. B. Bennett	Independent	Resignation	Yes
Banff	June 27, 1899	Robert Brett	Liberal	Arthur Sifton	Liberal-Conservative	Invalidation of the 1898 result	Yes

† Won by acclamation; this date is the date of the return of the writ.

== 3rd North-West Legislative Assembly 1894–1898 ==
By-election	Date	Incumbent	Party	Winner	Party	Cause	Retained
Lethbridge	October 26, 1897†	Charles Alexander Magrath	Independent	Charles Alexander Magrath	Independent	Unknown	No
Macleod	October 26, 1897†	Frederick Haultain	Independent	Frederick Haultain	Independent	Confirmation as Premier	Yes
Mitchell	October 26, 1897†	Hilliard Mitchell	Independent	Hilliard Mitchell	Independent	Unknown	Yes
Moose Jaw	October 26, 1897†	James Hamilton Ross	Independent	James Hamilton Ross	Independent	Confirmation as Territorial Secretary, Territorial Treasurer, Minister of Public Works, and Minister of Agriculture	Yes
South Qu'Appelle	October 26, 1897†	George H. V. Bulyea	Independent	George H. V. Bulyea	Independent	Unknown	Yes
Yorkton	October 26, 1897†	Fredrik Robert Insinger	Independent	Thomas Alfred Patrick	Independent	Unknown	Yes
Prince Albert West	July 7, 1897	John Lestock Reid	Independent	Thomas James Agnew	Independent	Unknown	No
North Qu'Appelle	December 7, 1896	William Sutherland	Independent	Donald H. McDonald	Independent	Unknown	Yes
Edmonton	August 4, 1896	Frank Oliver	Independent	Matthew McCauley	Independent	Resignation	No

† Won by acclamation; this date is the date of the return of the writ.

== 2nd North-West Legislative Assembly 1891–1894 ==
By-election	Date	Incumbent	Party	Winner	Party	Cause	Retained
Whitewood	February 16, 1894	Daniel Campbell	Independent	Joseph Clementson	Independent	Unknown	No
Wallace	November 12, 1892	Joel Reaman	Independent	Fredrik Robert Insinger	Independent	Unknown	No

== 1st Council of the North-West Territories 1876–1888 ==
By-election	Date	Incumbent	Party		Winner	Party	Cause	Retained
Macleod	September 5, 1887	Richard Henry Boyle		Independent	Frederick Haultain	Independent	Resignation	Yes
Qu'Appelle	May 24, 1887	Robert Crawford		Independent	William Sutherland	Independent	Resignation	Yes
Qu'Appelle	October 14, 1886	Thomas Wesley Jackson		Independent	Robert Crawford	Independent	Resignation	Yes
Calgary	July 14, 1886	James Davidson Geddes		Independent	John D. Lauder	Independent	Resignation	No
Calgary	July 14, 1886	James Davidson Geddes		Independent	Hugh Cayley	Independent	Resignation	Yes
Moose Mountain	July 8, 1886	John Gillanders Turriff		Independent	John Gillanders Turriff	Independent	Unknown	Yes
Calgary	June 28, 1884	District created	—N/a	—N/a	James Davidson Geddes	Independent	New electoral district	Yes
Moose Mountain	June 28, 1884	District created	—N/a	—N/a	John Gillanders Turriff	Independent	New electoral district	Yes
Broadview	August 31, 1883	District created	—N/a	—N/a	John Claude Hamilton	Independent	New electoral district	No
Moose Jaw	August 13, 1883	District created	—N/a	—N/a	James Hamilton Ross	Independent	New electoral district	Yes
Qu'Appelle	August 13, 1883	District created	—N/a	—N/a	Thomas Wesley Jackson	Independent	New electoral district	Yes
Regina	August 13, 1883	District created	—N/a	—N/a	William White	Independent	New electoral district	No
Lorne	June 5, 1883	Lawrence Clarke		Independent	Day Hort MacDowall	Independent	Retirement	No
Edmonton	May 29, 1883	District created	—N/a	—N/a	Frank Oliver	Independent	New electoral district	No
Lorne	March 23, 1881	District created	—N/a	—N/a	Lawrence Clarke	Independent	New electoral district	No

== See also ==
- List of federal by-elections in Canada
