= 1st Council of the North-West Territories =

Meeting period of the Parliament (Northwest Territories, Canada)

1st Council of the Northwest Territories
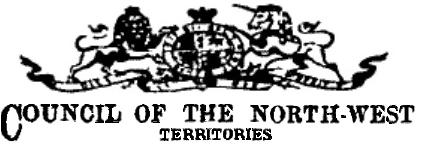

Type
- Type: Unicameral

History
- Established: 1876
- Disbanded: 1888
- Preceded by: Temporary North-West Council
- Succeeded by: 1st North-West Legislative Assembly
- Seats: 7 – 15

Elections
- Last election: 1885 North-West Territories election

Meeting place
- Fort Livingstone; Battleford; Regina

The 1st Council of the North-West Territories, also known as the North-West Council in Canada, lasted from October 7, 1876, to 1888. It was created as a permanent replacement to the Temporary North-West Council which existed prior to 1876.

A 2nd Council of the North-West Territories was elected in 1888. It was replaced in 1891 by the 1st North-West Assembly when the quota of elected members was reached.

(A different 2nd Council of the Northwest Territories (1905-1951) was created in 1905, when the NWT lost most of its population, to differentiate the new one from the two legislative councils of the NWT that had existed 1876 to 1891.)

== Early history and development ==
The first members of the new council were appointed under the North-West Territories Act and consisted of the Lieutenant Governor, appointed men and Stipendiary Magistrates. Elected representatives were added later and could join the council. If an area of 1,000 square miles (2,600 km^{2}) had 1,000 people, an electoral district could be set up and a district member elected. This created a patchwork of represented and unrepresented areas, and there was no official or independent boundaries commission; all electoral law at the beginning was under the purview of the Lieutenant Governor.

Three electoral districts were created in 1881 and for an unknown reason writs were only issued in the district of Lorne, which returned the first elected member, Lawrence Clarke.

Electors participating in the North-West Territories elections did not vote by secret ballot until the 1893 Whitewood by-election.

== Early sessions ==
When the first council formed under the new appointed government in 1876, the council consisted of the lieutenant governor who acted as the chairman (speaker), and two appointed members. Because a quorum could not be maintained, the council had to be adjourned if one member went to the washroom.

== Elections ==
Numerous elections took place during the period of 1876–1891 — 11 separate by-elections electing one or two members, 9 by-elections held on one day in September 1885 (1885 North-West Territories election), and the 1888 North-West Territories general election.

The election of 1885 took place on September 15, 1885. The election saw 11 members in 9 new districts returned to the council, due to high rate of population growth in the North-West Territories at the time.

After the 1885 election, elected members became the majority in the council vis a vis the appointed members, although they had to fight to wrest control from the "colonial" officials. It became a full assembly.

The other elections, other than the 1888 general election, are not considered general elections, as there was no dissolution of the assembly — not all the members were up for election. However, after three years from an election, a district had to have another election — the seat was declared empty to be filled in an election.

== By-election dates and summaries ==
=== March 23, 1881 Lorne by-election #1 ===
Election summary

Candidates	# of candidates	Popular vote	
Candidates	# of candidates	#	%
Elected candidates	1	250	63.61%
Defeated candidates	1	143	36.39%
Total	2	393	100%

=== May 29, 1883 Edmonton by-election ===
Election summary -- Frank Oliver elected

Candidates	# of candidates	Popular vote	
Candidates	# of candidates	#	%
Elected candidates	1	155	59.62%
Defeated candidates	2	105	40.38%
Total	3	260	100%

=== June 5, 1883 Lorne by-election ===
Election summary

Candidates	# of candidates	Popular vote	
Candidates	# of candidates	#	%
Elected candidates	1	279	69.92%
Defeated candidates	1	120	30.08%
Total	2	399	100%

=== August 13, 1883 Moose Jaw, Regina, Qu'Appelle sub-election ===
Election summary

Candidates	# of candidates	Popular vote	
Candidates	# of candidates	#	%
Elected candidates	3	517	72.82%
Defeated candidates	5	193	27.18%
Total	8	710	100%

=== August 31, 1883 Broadview by-election ===
Election summary

Candidates	# of candidates	Popular vote	
Candidates	# of candidates	#	%
Elected candidates	1	91	55.83%
Defeated candidates	1	72	44.17%
Total	2	163	100%

=== June 28, 1884 Calgary by-election ===
Election summary — James Geddes elected

Candidates	# of candidates	Popular vote	
Candidates	# of candidates	#	%
Elected candidates	1	100	53.19
Defeated candidates	1	88	46.81
Total	2	188	

(vote totals not recorded in Mardon and Mardon Alberta Election Results)

=== June 28, 1884 Moose Mountain by-election ===
Election summary

Candidates	# of candidates	Popular vote	
Candidates	# of candidates	#	%
Elected candidates	1	98	64.9
Defeated candidates	1	53	35.1
Total	2	151	

(1885 North-West Territories election -- almost a dozen by-elections were held in September 1885)

=== July 8, 1886 Moose Mountain by-election ===
Election summary

Candidates	# of candidates		Popular vote	
Candidates	Incumbent	New	#	%
Acclaimed candidates	1	-	-	-
Total	1		-	-

=== July 16, 1886 Calgary by-election ===
Each voter could cast up to two votes.

Election summary — Hugh St. Q. Cayley and John D. Lauder elected

Candidates	# of candidates	Popular vote	
Candidates	# of candidates	#	%
Elected candidates	2	427	61.88%
Defeated candidates	2	263	38.12%
Total	4	690	100%

=== October 14, 1886 Qu'Appelle by-election ===
Election summary

Candidates	# of candidates	Popular vote	
Candidates	# of candidates	#	%
Elected candidates	1	332	53.37%
Defeated candidates	1	290	46.62%
Total	2	622	100%

=== May 24, 1887 Qu'Appelle by-election ===
Election summary

Candidates	# of candidates	Popular vote	
Candidates	# of candidates	#	%
Elected candidates	1	427	61.88%
Defeated candidates	1	263	38.12%
Total	2	690	100%

=== September 5, 1887 Macleod by-election ===
Election summary

Candidates	# of candidates	Popular vote	
Candidates	# of candidates	#	%
Elected candidates	1	301	65.86%
Defeated candidates	1	156	34.14%
Total	2	457 (1888 North-West Territories general election)	100%

== Legislative session dates ==
- 1st Legislative Session, March 8, 1877, to March 22, 1877
- 2nd Legislative Session, July 10, 1878, to August 2, 1878
- 3rd Legislative Session, August 28, 1879, to September 22, 1879
- 4th Legislative Session, May 26, 1881, to June 11, 1881
- 5th Legislative Session, August 20, 1883, to October 4, 1883
- 6th Legislative Session, July 3, 1884, to August 16, 1884
- 7th Legislative Session, November 5, 1885, to December 18, 1885
- 8th Legislative Session, October 13, 1886, to November 19, 1886
- 9th Legislative Session, October 14, 1887, to November 19, 1887

== Elected members of the 1st Council of the North-West Territories ==
For complete electoral history, see individual districts

District	Member	Date elected	Date left office	No. of terms	Reason for leaving office
Broadview	John Claude Hamilton	August 31, 1883	September 16, 1885	1st term	Retirement?
Broadview	Charles Marshallsay	September 16, 1885	November 5, 1887	1st term	Death
Calgary	James Davidson Geddes	June 28, 1884	1886	1st term	
Calgary	John D. Lauder	July 14, 1886	June 30, 1888	1st term	Retirement
Calgary	Hugh Cayley	July 14, 1886	June 30, 1888	1st term	Re-elected 1888 election
Edmonton	Frank Oliver	May 29, 1883	September 15, 1885	1st term	Defeated
Edmonton	Herbert Charles Wilson	September 15, 1885	June 30, 1888	1st term	Re-elected 1888 election
Lorne	Lawrence Clarke	March 23, 1881	June 4, 1883	1st term	Retirement
Lorne	Day Hort MacDowall	June 5, 1883	September 14, 1885	1st term	Retirement
Lorne	Owen Hughes	September 15, 1885	June 30, 1888	1st term	Retirement
Macleod	Richard Henry Boyle	September 15, 1885	August, 1887	1st term	Resignation
Macleod	Frederick Haultain	September 5, 1887	June 30, 1888	1st term	Re-elected 1888 election
Moose Jaw	James Hamilton Ross	August 13, 1883	June 30, 1888	1st, 2nd term	Re-elected 1888 election
Moose Mountain	John Gillanders Turriff	June 29, 1884	June 30, 1888	1st, 2nd term	Re-elected 1888 election
Moosomin	Spencer Bedford	September 15, 1885	June 30, 1888	1st term	Retirement
Qu'Appelle	Thomas Wesley Jackson	August 13, 1883	September, 1886	1st, 2nd term	Resignation
Qu'Appelle	William Dell Perley	September 15, 1885	February 22, 1887	1st term	Elected in 1887 federal election
Qu'Appelle	Robert Crawford	October 14, 1886	June 30, 1888	1st term	Retirement
Qu'Appelle	William Sutherland	May 24, 1887	June 30, 1888	1st term	Re-elected 1888 election
Regina	William White	August 13, 1883	August 12, 1885	1st term	Retirement
Regina	David Jelly	September 15, 1885	June 30, 1888	1st term	Re-elected 1888 election
Regina	John Secord	September 15, 1885	June 30, 1888	1st term	Re-elected 1888 election
St. Albert	Samuel Cunningham	September 15, 1885	June 30, 1888	1st term	Defeated 1888 election

== Appointed members of the 1st Council of the North-West Territories ==
Member	Date joined council	Date left office	Reason for leaving office
Matthew Ryan	January 1, 1876	1883	Retirement?
Hugh Richardson	January 1, 1876	June 30, 1888	Re-appointed after the election of 1888
James Macleod, NWMP	January 1, 1876	June 30, 1888	Re-appointed after the election of 1888
Pascal Breland	July 10, 1878	June 30, 1888	Lost appointment when Legislature dissolved
Acheson Gosford Irvine	August 20, 1883	June 30, 1888	Lost appointment when Legislature dissolved
Hayter Reed	August 20, 1883	June 30, 1888	Lost appointment when Legislature dissolved
Charles Rouleau	July 3, 1883	June 30, 1888	Re-appointed after the election of 1888
Jeremiah Travis	1885?	?	?

== See also ==
- List of Northwest Territories premiers
- List of Northwest Territories commissioners
- List of Northwest Territories lieutenant-governors
- List of Northwest Territories general elections
