= 1888 North-West Territories general election =

- 20–30 June 1888

22 seats in the North-West Legislative Assembly
Chairman after election
Robert Brett

The 1888 North-West Territories general election elected members of the 2nd Legislative Council of the North-West Territories. The 2nd Legislative Council of the North-West Territories replaced the 1st Council of the North-West Territories. The 2nd Legislative Council of the North-West Territories was replaced by the 1st North-West Assembly in 1891 when the quota of elected members was reached. (A different 2nd Council of the Northwest Territories (1905–1951) was created in 1905, when the NWT lost most of its population, to differentiate the new one from the two legislative councils of the NWT that had existed 1876 to 1891.)

The 1888 election was the first general election in the history of the North-West Territories, Canada. Elections were held in various districts between 20 June and 30 June 1888. Although considered a general election, the writs were issued to return on various days. (1891 North-West Territories general election would be the first election where all the seats came empty on the same day.)

Prior to 1888, the elected members of the 1st Council of the North-West Territories were elected in by-elections to supplement members appointed by the Government of Canada. In order to have an elected member, a constituency needed to be set up in an area 1,000 square miles (2,600 km^{2}) in size that had 1,000 residents. This created a patchwork of represented and unrepresented areas across the sprawling and sparsely settled territory.

Twenty-one members were elected in this election.

Robert Brett, the member for Red Deer, was appointed government leader by Lieutenant Governor Joseph Royal. His official title was Chairman of the Lieutenant Governor's Advisory Council.

Three judges were appointed to the legislative assembly to provide legal advice, but they were not able to vote. They represented the territory at large.

Voters in this election cast their votes by telling the returning officer who they wanted to vote for. This system lasted until 1894 when a secret ballot was first used in a by-election in the Whitewood district.

== Election results ==
Voter turnout cannot be established as no voters lists were in use. Candidates were all elected on non-partisan basis. Decisions in the council were decided by majority vote.

Three members were elected by acclamation. One was re-elected; two were newly elected.

Calgary and Edmonton elected two members through Plurality block voting.

Election summary

Candidates	# of candidates		Popular vote	
Candidates	Incumbent	New	#	%
Acclaimed candidates	1	2	-	-
Elected candidates	8	10	5,081	62.53%
Defeated candidates	-	19	3,045	37.47%
Total	40		8,126	100%

== Legal advisors ==
Three members were appointed by Lieutenant Governor Joseph Royal after the election: James Macleod, Hugh Richardson and Charles Rouleau. The purpose of these three legal advisors was to bring experience in procedure, protocol and amending and introducing legislation. The legal advisors held seats at large, were allowed to participate in debates (but not vote) and were paid a salary of $250.

The three members of the assembly had already served as members of the Assembly previously. There were no legal advisors reappointed after dissolution of the 1st North-West Legislative Assembly in 1891.

== Members of the Legislative Assembly elected ==
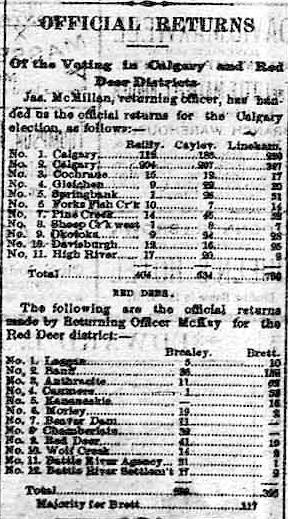
Results of Calgary and Red Deer, as published in the Calgary Tribune

For complete electoral history, see individual districts

Electoral District	Elected	Second	Third	Fourth	Incumbent
Batoche	Hilliard Mitchell; 82; 55.78%	James Fisher; 65; 44.22%			New District
Battleford	James Clinkskill; 180; 53.57%	David Livingstone Clink; 156; 46.43%			New District
Calgary (Note: Two representatives were elected from the district.)	John Lineham; 809; 43.80% Hugh Cayley; 634; 34.33%	James Reilly; 404; 21.87%			John D. Lauder and Hugh Cayley (elected on July 14, 1886)
Edmonton	Herbert Charles Wilson; 395; 32.54% Frank Oliver; 350; 28.83%	Samuel Cunningham; 319; 26.28%	Daniel Maloney; 150; 12.36%		Herbert Charles Wilson
Kinistino	James Hoey; 104; 53.89%	John C. Slater; 89; 46.11%			New District
Macleod	Frederick W. A. G. Haultain; Acclamation				Frederick W. A. G. Haultain
Medicine Hat	Thomas Tweed; Acclamation				New District
Moose Jaw	James Hamilton Ross; 161; 55.52%	George Malcolm Annable; 129; 44.48%			James Hamilton Ross
Moosomin	John Ryerson Neff; Acclamation				Spencer Bedford
North Qu’Appelle	William Sutherland; 268; 71.85%	William Albert Clark; 105; 28.15%			New District from Qu'Appelle; William Sutherland
North Regina	David Jelly; 227; 62.71%	George W. Brown; 135; 37.29%			New District from Regina; David Jelly
Prince Albert	William Plaxton; 383; 37.85% John Felton Betts; 322; 31.82%	Owen Hughes; 307; 30.34%		New District	
Red Deer	Robert Brett; 325; 60.98%	Alfred Brealey; 208; 39.02%			New District
Souris	John Gillanders Turriff; 236; 64.84%	John Wesley Connell; 92; 25.27%	Fraser; 36; 9.89%		New District from Moose Mountain; John Gillanders Turriff
South Qu’Appelle	George Davidson; 262; 57.33%	William Robert Bell; 195; 42.67%			New District from Qu'Appelle; Robert Crawford
South Regina	John Secord; 131; 52.19%	David Lynch Scott; 120; 47.81%			New District from Regina; John Secord
Wallace	Joel Reaman; 188; 72.31%	William Eakin; 72; 27.69%			New District
Whitewood	Alexander Thorburn; 166; 38.88%	Thomas Gamble Lyons; 158; 37.00%	John Hawkes; 103; 24.12%		New District
Wolseley	Benjamin Parkyn Richardson; 209; 50.73%	James Dill; 203; 49.27%			New District

== Medicine Hat ==
In the Medicine Hat electoral district, candidate William Finlay had withdrawn before election day. The returning officer declared Thomas Tweed elected by acclamation. Finlay lost his nomination deposit of $200.00

== Notes ==
- Plurality block voting was used; each voter had two votes
