= 1885 North-West Territories election =

- 15 September 1885

11 members to the Council of the North-West Territories

The 1885 North-West Territories election was the first major election in the history of the territory. On 15 September 1885, 11 members were elected in separate elections or by acclamation. The elections saw members acclaimed and elected in various electoral districts to the 1st Council of the North-West Territories.

The elections were held to elect members to new districts, created to cope with rapid growth of settlers in the NWT at the time. These new districts were drawn in the wake of the North-West Rebellion of spring 1885.

Elections were also held in established electoral districts to renew members terms at the end of three years as per North-West Territories law at the time.

The election was not considered a general election, since it did not involve every electoral district, and was not caused by the dissolution of the council.

The election was followed by the 1st North-West Territories general election three years later, in 1888 at the completion of the members' three-year terms. The election was conducted without political parties.

Qu'Appelle and Regina each elected two members. In these districts, the election was held using block voting – each voter could cast up to two votes.

== Summary ==
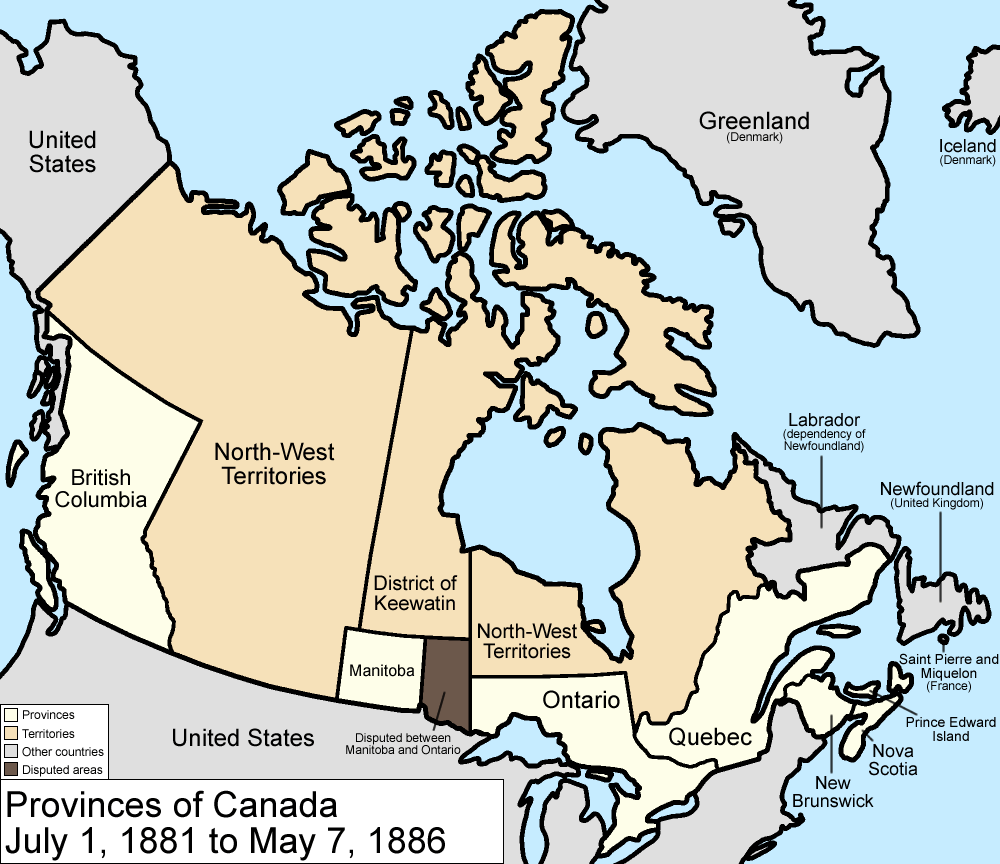
Map of the provinces and territories of Canada as they were between 1881 and 1886.

| Election summary | # of candidates | | Popular vote | |
| Election summary | Incumbent | New | # | % |
|---|---|---|---|---|
| Elected candidates | 2 | 7 | 2,056 | 61.54% |
| Acclaimed candidates | - | 2 | - | - |
| Defeated candidates | 1 | 8 | 1,285 | 38.46% |
| Total | 20 | | 3,341 | 100% |

== Members elected ==
| District | Name | First elected | No. of terms |
|---|---|---|---|
| Broadview | Charles Marshallsay | 1885 | 1st term |
| Edmonton | Herbert Charles Wilson | 1885 | 1st term |
| Lorne | Owen Edward Hughes | 1885 | 1st term |
| Macleod | Richard Henry Boyle | 1885 | 1st term |
| Macleod | Frederick W. A. G. Haultain (1887) | 1887 | 1st term |
| Moose Jaw | James Hamilton Ross | 1883 | 2nd term |
| Moosomin | Spencer Bedford | 1885 | 1st term |
| Qu'Appelle | Thomas Wesley Jackson | 1883 | 2nd term |
| Qu'Appelle | William Dell Perley | 1885 | 1st term |
| Qu'Appelle | Robert Crawford (1886) | 1886 | 1st term |
| Qu'Appelle | William Sutherland (1887) | 1887 | 1st term |
| Regina | David Jelly | 1885 | 1st term |
| Regina | John Secord | 1885 | 1st term |
| St. Albert | Samuel Cunningham | 1885 | 1st term |

Calgary and Moose Mountain did not participate in the 1885 election because they elected members to a three-year term in 1884. The Moosomin seat was won by acclamation.

=== St. Albert electoral district ===
Samuel Cunningham won over Daniel Maloney.
