= John Lineham =

Canadian politician and businessman

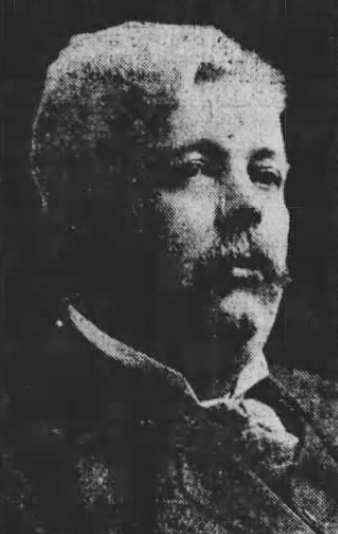

Member of the Legislative Assembly of the Northwest Territories
- In office 1894–1898
- Constituency: High River

Member of the Legislative Assembly of the Northwest Territories
- In office 1888–1894
- Constituency: Calgary

Personal details
- Born: March 21, 1857 Mitchell, Upper Canada
- Died: April 21, 1913 (aged 56) Calgary, Alberta, Canada
- Children: 2
- Occupation: Politician, businessman

John Lineham (21 March 1857 – 21 April 1913) was a territorial-level politician and businessman from Northwest Territories, Canada.

Lineham was born 21 March 1857 to Thomas Lineham and Barbara McIntyre in Mitchell, Canada West. He married Mary Elizabeth Martin in Collingwood, Ontario on 21 March 1894 and had two daughters. Lineham would head to Brandon, Manitoba and enter the cattle business, and later in 1883 he went to Calgary ahead of the Canadian Pacific Railway. Lineham purchased A. P. Samples' butcher shop with a partner and formed a successful meat business under the name "Dunn and Lineham", which would eventually be sold to William Roper Hull and later Patrick Burns.

Lineham was elected to the Legislative Assembly of the Northwest Territories in the 1888 Northwest Territories general election. He won the top place in the two-man district of Calgary. Three candidates ran for the two seats. Hugh Cayley was returned to the legislature as the second-place candidate. Lineham and Cayley were re-elected by acclamation in the 1891 Northwest Territories general election.

The electoral district was abolished and Lineham ran in the new High River electoral district in the 1894 Northwest Territories general election. He was easily re-elected and served his final term. He did not run for office after the assembly dissolved in 1898.

Lineham contested the November 1886 Calgary municipal election garnering 172 votes, but ultimately losing to George Clift King by 23 votes. In 1909 Lineham would be acclaimed as Mayor of Okotoks, Alberta, and subsequently acclaimed again in 1910.

Lineham formed the Rocky Mountain Development Company with George Leeson and engineer Allan Patrick, and on 21 September 1902 would make Alberta's first major oil strike in what is now Waterton Lakes National Park. The well site, Lineham Discovery Well No. 1 would be renamed First Oil Well in Western Canada and designated a National Historic Site of Canada on 17 May 1965.

John Lineham died in Calgary on 21 April 1913 from Bright's disease. Upon his death Lineham left a considerable estate worth approximately CA$500,000 which was mostly left to his daughters and other family members.

== Honours ==
- Canadian Petroleum Hall of Fame
- Mount Lineham, a 2,485-metre mountain in Waterton Lakes National Park
- Lineham Creek, a stream in Alberta
- Lineham Provincial Recreation Area, a provincial park in Alberta.

Legislative Assembly of the Northwest Territories
Preceded by John D. Lauder	MLA Calgary; 1888-1894	Succeeded by District Abolished
Preceded by New District	MLA High River; 1894-1898	Succeeded by Richard Alfred Wallace
