= Daniel Maloney =

Canadian politician

Member of the Legislative Assembly of the North-West Territories for St. Albert
- In office 1894–1898
- In office 1902–1903

Personal details
- Born: March 7, 1848 Picton, Canada West
- Died: February 12, 1910 (aged 61)
- Spouse: Hannah Ridsdale (m. 1873)
- Occupation: farmer, constable, politician

Daniel Maloney (March 7, 1848 – February 12, 1910) was a politician from Northwest Territories, Canada.

Maloney first ran for election to the Legislative Assembly of the Northwest Territories in the 1888 Northwest Territories general election in the Edmonton electoral district. He finished a distant fourth place in a field of four candidates behind the winners Herbert Charles Wilson and Frank Oliver and the third place finisher Samuel Cunningham.

Maloney ran for a second time in the 1891 Northwest Territories general election in the reconstituted St. Albert electoral district. He again finished last, this time in a field of three candidates.

In Maloney's third attempt for office, he won election in the 1894 Northwest Territories general election, defeating incumbent Antonio Prince.

Maloney was defeated running for a second term in the 1898 Northwest Territories general election by Frederic Villeneuve. Maloney would win his seat back in the 1902 Northwest Territories general election. In 1903 he was unseated after allegations of bribery that was committed by his official agents during his 1902 election campaign surfaced. A by-election was held on June 9, 1903 and Maloney ran to keep his seat. He was defeated by Louis Lambert who had lost to Maloney in the 1902 general election.

Policing and Military Career

In 1873 Sir John a MacDonald had created the North-West Mounted Police (Predecessor of the RCMP). He had participated in the Great March West and assisted on the assault at Fort Whoop-Up, which at the time was a location Americans traveled to, to illegally sell whiskey and other alcoholic beverages to the local indigenous populations.

Maloney was stationed at the local NWMP garrison in Edmonton as well as Calgary. He found himself in the area and built connections and relationships with the locals (Most of which being Metis). It is believed he met his wife around this time who was a Cree woman. Later on he moved to St. Albert, where he settled in the location. By the time he had retired from the NWMP, he was a staff sergeant.

In 1885 the North-West Rebellion had broken out. Canadian-Metis relations in the east were poor causing two rebellions in the span of a decade. The North-West Rebellion had established the Provisional Government of Saskatchewan. It had interest in expanding towards the west as the vast majority of the population was itself Metis. However, in Alberta the Metis were much more loyal and friendly with the Canadian government. Maloney helped establish a military unit known as the "St. Albert Mounted Rifles" which consisted of roughly 55 members at any given time. All officers of the unit were Metis, excluding Maloney, who was the first lieutenant (commander being a captain). The unit was recognized as a part of the Canadian militia by the governor general shortly after it was formed. All but five members were Metis.

The unit never ended up seeing combat in the open field. However did assist in protecting Catholic Churches from Metis protesters.

Legislative Assembly of the Northwest Territories
Preceded by Antonio Prince	MLA St. Albert; 1894-1898	Succeeded by Frederic Villeneuve
Preceded by Frederic Villeneuve	MLA St. Albert; 1902-1903	Succeeded by Louis Lambert
