= John Cunningham (voyageur) =

Canadian voyageur, postmaster, and clerk

- Born: John Patrick Daniel Cunningham; 16 February 1817; Île-à-la-Crosse, Saskatchewan, Canada
- Died: 12 October 1870 (aged 53); Paint Creek House, Alberta, Canada
- Citizenship: Irish
- Occupations: Voyageur; Postmaster; Clerk
- Children: Samuel Cunningham

John Patrick Daniel Cunningham (16 February 1817 – 12 October 1870) was a Canadian voyageur, postmaster, and clerk.

== Early life ==
John Cunningham was born in Île-à-la-Crosse, Saskatchewan, on 16 February 1817, as the eldest son of Patrick Cunningham, a postmaster from Sligo, Ireland, who had become a voyageur at Hudson's Bay Company (HBC), and of Nancy Anne Bruce, a native of Louisiana. He was baptized on 27 August 1826, at the age of 9.

During his childhood, the Cunningham family traveled to several destinations, such as Fort Chipewyan in 1823–26, Fort Churchill in 1826–27, the Islands of Lake District in 1827–29, and Fort Severn in 1931, where his father drowned in the River Severn, thus widowing his wife, who took her family to Red River of the North in Old Kildonan.

== Multiple marriages ==
On 1 June 1833, the 16-year-old Cunningham was employed by the HBC, who sent him back to the Lake District, so that he could start his journey as an apprentice labourer in a familiar setting, and his three years there were followed by another four years of apprenticeship at Fort Assiniboine, from 1836 until 1940. (Note: On 18 March 1836, a certain John Cunningham was baptized at Red River as an adult half-breed, and in the following year, on 26 January 1837, he married Jane Work, who also had an Irish father, and the couple only had one child, Jane (baptized on 14 July 1838). He is most likely the John Cunningham who emigrated to the Columbia River as a member of the Sinclair Party, led by James Sinclair (1811–1856), which consisted of a group of 23 families organized by the HBC, who hoped to bolster British claims to the Oregon territory, which at the time was also being contested by the United States. The Sinclair Party arrived at Fort Vancouver on 13 October 1841, and their journey was journaled by John Flett (1815–1892), whose accounts include a list of those who died, where many names were misspelled, such as "Mrs. Coneyham", most likely Cunningham's wife, Jane Work.) In the 1840s, Cunningham worked as a voyageur, like his father, and also as an interpreter in the journal of Reverend Robert Rundle (1811–1896). On 28 February 1841, at Rocky Mountain House, the 24-year-old Cunningham married Margaret Mondion, whose origins are uncertain, though she may have come from the White Horse Plains area in Manitoba. However, she died in Vancouver, Washington, in 1845, the year in which John returned to the Red River.

In the following year, Cunningham returned to the Saskatchewan district, where on 15 September 1846, he married Rosalie L'hirondelle at Lac Ste. Anne, Alberta, and the couple only had one child, Catherine, born on 18 December 1847, who died in the following month, as pointed out in Rundle's Journal on 24 January 1848, ironically the last time he is mentioned there. Three months later, on 8 April, their second child was born, Samuel, and they had a further eight children, John (1851–1904), James (1854–1940), Albert (1856–1925), Nancy (1859–1918), Edward (1862–1920), Daniel (1864–1935), Rachel (1866–1881), Alfred (1868–1931), and Henry (1869–1955).

== Later life ==
After a hiatus of seven years, Cunningham reappeared in 1855, aged 38, when he was hired as an interpreter by the HBC, being in charge at Lac Ste Anne in 1857–58, and then becoming a postmaster and clerk at Fort Edmonton, a position that he held for a decade, from 1858 until his retirement in 1868. In the autumn of 1866, Cunningham led a group that had 15 mixed-blood traders to a camp of Bloods, whose head chief had sent a messenger to Fort Edmonton requesting a trading party, but their journey was halted by a group of Blackfoot warriors who had previously attacked Fort Pitt, and one of its chiefs, the towering Big Swan, forced his way through the crowd and delivered a heated speech criticizing the traders. Recognizing the hostility toward his group, Cunningham began repacking the 30 Red River carts that he had brought, but he was shoved aside by Big Swan, who led his warriors to loot the traders' carts; however, the pillaging was stopped by Chief Crowfoot, who then, defying several warrior chiefs, provided an escort which allowed Cunningham to safely return to Fort Edmonton with his empty carts.

In addition to his sons, he also raised a certain John Grace Matheson, who was still a young boy when Cunningham spotted him wandering in a camp to escape the tedium of school and farm, and since he was a strong young man, with no ties to hold him, he brought him to St. Anne, where he was quickly accepted as a family member. His wife, a faith devotee, strove to influence her children and Matheson to become a priest, and she succeeded with her second son Edward, who was educated at Ottawa University and ordained by Bishop Grandin in Alberta in 1890. When he returned, he had forgotten his boyhood admiration of John Grace, so he referred to him by the term "cousin".

== Death and legacy ==
Cunningham died in Paint Creek House, Alberta, on 12 October 1870, at the age of 53, during the smallpox epidemic of 1870. His youngest son Henry went on to become a founding member of the Métis Association of Alberta.
