= Owen Hughes (politician) =

Canadian politician

Owen Edward Hughes (c. 1848–1932) was a British-born judge and territorial level politician in Canada. He served as a Member of the North-West Territories Legislative Assembly from 1885 until 1888.

== Early life ==
Owen Hughes was born in London, England, in about 1848. Hughes and his brother were sent to school in France following the death of his father around 1852. After finishing school in France, he moved to Germany to attend university at either Heidelberg or Hannover.

== Military career ==
According to Owen Hughes, he joined the German Army sometime between 1864 and 1866 and was still enlisted in 1870 at the beginning of the Franco-Prussian war. Upon learning that his brother was fighting for the other side, he deserted and returned to England. He claimed to then have been involved in running guns from England to France and in 1871, he was able to get his brother out of France. Hughes then moved to the North-West Territories as an employee of Kew Stobart and Co. and worked in Nelson River from 1873 to 1874 and in The Pas in 1875. In 1876, Stobard retired from Duck Lake and Hughes was appointed head of their fur trade business. In 1879, four militia companies were organised in the Prince Albert area and he was appointed the captain of the Duck Lake company that consisted mainly of Metis from the Duck Lake, Batoche and St. Laurent. Gabriel Dumont was one of his two lieutenants. The militia units were disbanded in 1884 only sightly prior to the North-West Rebellion. After Dumont's victory at Duck Lake, Hughes is reported to have said to Middleton, "Gabriel Dumont, my lieutenant, and my half-breeds who have just driven your army back. Great Scot, had I been there to lead them, we'd have driven you out of the country." Despite the fact that many of his friends fought with Riel, Hughes fought on the Federal Government side, was present at the Battle of Battoche and accompanied Middleton's men aboard the Northcoate.

== Judicial career ==
Hughes is listed as a witness to the signing of Treaty 5 at Norway House in 1875. In 1876, Hughes was appointed as a Senior Magistrate of the District of Keewatin and of the North-West Territories in 1878. He also served as Sheriff of the District of Saskatchewan from 1887 to 1899.

== Political career ==
Hughes was first elected to the North-West Territories Legislature in the 1885 North-West Territories election. He defeated candidate Andrew Porter by eight votes to win the Lorne electoral district and his first term in office.

Hughes ran for re-election in the Prince Albert electoral district in the 1888 North-West Territories general election. The electoral district was mandated to return two members to the assembly in that election. He was defeated by William Plaxton and John Felton Betts finishing third place in a field of three candidates.

== Family ==
In 1881, Hughes married Isabella Inkster, a member of a prominent Anglo-Metis family in Winnipeg. They had two sons.

Legislative Assembly of the Northwest Territories
Preceded by Day Hort MacDowall	MLA Lorne; 1885-1888	Succeeded by District Abolished
