= William Dell Perley =

Canadian politician (1838–1909)

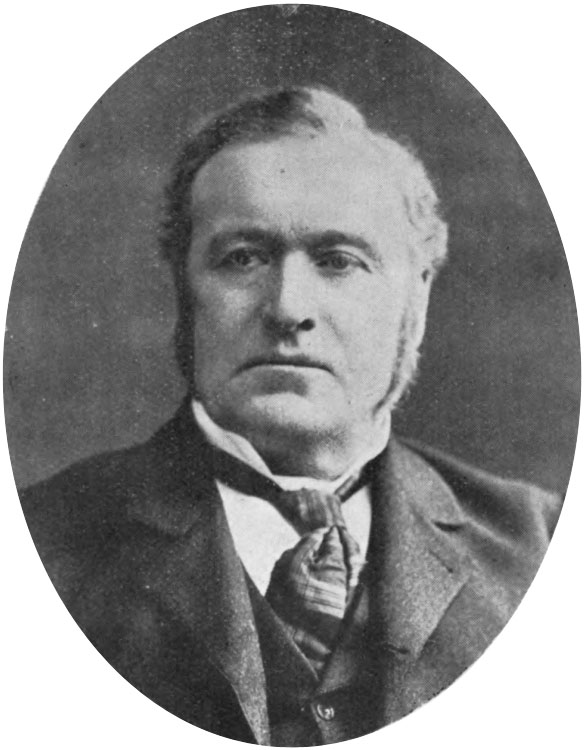

Member of Parliament for Assiniboia East
- In office 1887–1888
- Succeeded by: Edgar Dewdney

Personal details
- Born: February 6, 1838 Gladstone, New Brunswick, Canada
- Died: July 15, 1909 (aged 71) Wolseley, Saskatchewan, Canada
- Profession: Politician; farmer

William Dell Perley (February 6, 1838 – July 15, 1909) was a farmer and politician from western Canada. He served as a member of the North-West Territories Council from 1885 to 1887, MP in the House of Commons from 1887 to 1888, and then as a Canadian senator.

== Background ==
William had an extensive political career, he ran at least twice for the House of Commons of Canada in Sunbury electoral district as a Conservative being defeated both times in 1878 and 1882 in hotly contested and very close elections.

He moved out west to the Regina area in the North-West Territories and ran for the Legislative Assembly of the North-West Territories in the brand new Qu'Appelle electoral district in the 1885 North-West Territories election and won the second of two seats in the district.

He resigned his territorial seat two years prior to running in the 1887 Canadian federal election when he won one of the first House of Commons of Canada seats in the North-West Territories.

A forceful speaker, Perley served in the House of Commons for a year before being appointed to the Senate of Canada on the advice of John A. Macdonald. He served as a Senator for the North-West Territories, and then the province of Saskatchewan after it was created in 1905.

He died while still in office in 1909.

His son, Ernest Perley, would also become a parliamentarian.

1887 Canadian federal election: Assiniboia East
| Party | Candidate | Votes | % |
|---|---|---|---|
| Conservative | William Dell Perley | 1,736 | 63.22 |
| Liberal | James Hay Dickie | 1,010 | 36.78 |
| Total valid votes | | 2,746 | 100.00 |
| Total rejected ballots | | unknown | |
| Turnout | | 2,746 | 72.80 |
| Eligible voters | | 3,772 | |
Source: Library of Parliament

Legislative Assembly of the Northwest Territories
| Preceded by Thomas Wesley Jackson | MLA Qu'Appelle; 1885–1887 | Succeeded by William Sutherland |
