= Yellowknife (disambiguation) =

Yellowknife is the capital city of the Northwest Territories, Canada.

Yellowknife may also refer to:

- Yellowknife River, a river in the Northwest Territories, Canada
- Yellowknives, a tribe of North American indigenous people who gave their name to the city
- Yellowknife (administrative district), a former electoral district in the Northwest Territories, Canada
- HMCS Yellowknife, a Canadian coastal defence vessel
- Yellowknife (film), a 2002 film by Canadian director Rodrigue Jean
