= Canada and the American Civil War =

At the time of the American Civil War (1861–1865), Canada did not yet exist as a federated nation. Instead, British North America consisted of the Province of Canada (parts of modern southern Ontario and southern Quebec) and the separate colonies of Newfoundland, New Brunswick, Prince Edward Island, Nova Scotia, British Columbia and Vancouver Island, as well as a crown territory administered by the Hudson's Bay Company called Rupert's Land. Britain and its colonies were officially neutral for the duration of the war. Despite this, tensions between Britain and the United States were high due to incidents such as the Trent Affair, blockade runners loaded with British arms supplies bound for the Confederacy, and the Confederate Navy commissioning of the CSS Alabama from Britain.

Canadians were largely opposed to slavery, and Canada had recently become the terminus of the Underground Railroad. Close economic and cultural links across the long border, also encouraged Canadian sympathy towards the Union. Yet relations were not all good with the US. Secretary of State William H. Seward, while campaigning on behalf of presidential candidate Abraham Lincoln, made no secret of their desire to annex Canada. Seward believed in manifest destiny, the doctrine that the United States would inevitably expand across the entire North American continent. While he seems to have preferred to acquire territory through negotiation rather than aggression, Canadians were not wholly assured of America's peaceful intentions, and indeed Seward proposed an invasion of Canada, but Lincoln declared he would fight only one war at a time. Between 33,000 and 55,000 men from British North America enlisted in the war, almost all of them fighting for Union forces. Some press and churches in Canada supported the secession, and some others did not. There was talk in London in 1861–1862 of mediating the war or recognizing the Confederacy. Washington warned this meant war, and London feared Canada would quickly be seized by the Union army.

== Trent Affair ==
In November 1861 tensions escalated between Washington and London when an American warship stopped the British mail ship RMS Trent on the high seas and seized two Confederate diplomats, James Mason and John Slidell. London demanded their return and an apology, and to signal its intention to defend its possessions sent 14,000 combat troops to Canada and the Maritimes, while the Canadians planned to raise 40,000 militia. President Abraham Lincoln defused the crisis by releasing the diplomats, though he did not issue an apology. He cautioned his Secretary of State William H. Seward, "One war at a time." The British decided that unification of the North American colonies was now a high priority, as a new strong dominion would relieve London of the need to station large British forces to defend British North America.

== The Grand Trunk Railway Brigade ==
Rising concerns over the security of railways in Canada while the Civil War raged in the United States led to the 1862 creation of the Grand Trunk Railway Brigade. This unit of Canadian Volunteer Militia recruited amongst railway employees had infantry and artillery companies deployed along the railway lines in Canada East and Canada West.

== Confederate activity in British North America ==
Confederate operators secretly used Canada and particularly the Maritimes as a base against the North, in violation of British neutrality. The Maritimes' struggle to maintain their independence from Canada led some Maritimers to be sympathetic to the Confederate desire to secede from the United States. For example, Halifax merchant Benjamin Wier (1805–1868) acted as Halifax agent for many of the Confederate blockade runners carrying British arms during the Civil War. In return for ship repair facilities in Halifax, the Confederates supplied him with valuable cotton for re-export to Britain, a lucrative but hazardous course for Wier which required severing his business connections with New England. Halifax's role in arms trafficking for the South was so noticeable that the Acadian Recorder in 1864 described the city's effort as a "mercenary aid to a fratricidal war, which, without outside intervention, would have long ago ended." U.S. Secretary of State Seward complained on March 14, 1865:

Halifax has been for more than one year, and yet is, a naval station for vessels which, running the blockade, furnish supplies and munitions of war to our enemy, and it has been made a rendezvous for those piratical cruisers which come out from Liverpool and Glasgow, to destroy our commerce on the high seas, and even to carry war into the ports of the United States. Halifax is a postal and despatch station in the correspondence between the rebels at Richmond and their emissaries in Europe. Halifax merchants are known to have surreptitiously imported provisions, arms, and ammunition from our seaports, and then transshipped them to the rebels. The governor of Nova Scotia has been neutral, just, and friendly; so were the judges of the province who presided on the trial of the Chesapeake. But then it is understood that, on the other hand, merchant shippers of Halifax, and many of the people of Halifax, are willing agents and abettors of the enemies of the United States, and their hostility has proved not merely offensive but deeply injurious.

Confederate Secret Service agents operating in Canada were considerable enough to be widely tolerated. For example, in Toronto,

Southern agents operated freely and openly with little to no concern from local authorities who were governed by British North America’s official policy of neutrality. Indeed, Southerners enjoyed the sympathy of most of Toronto’s political, social, and business elite—although few were as enthusiastic in supporting the Confederate cause as George Taylor Denison III.

Canadian banks funded their activities and Toronto, Montreal, St. Catharines, and Halifax were among the centers of well-financed Confederate networks by Confederate agents and sympathizers in these cities. Several Canadian hotels across the territory, including the Queen's Hotel, Toronto and St. Louis hotel in Quebec City, acted as informal headquarters for Confederate Secret Service activities.

=== Chesapeake ===
On 7 December 1863, while the new Union tug Chesapeake was preparing for service in the South Atlantic Blockading Squadron, 17 Canadians disguised as passengers seized it off Cape Cod, Massachusetts. Word of the takeover reached Portland on the morning of 9 December and quickly spread from there. The news prompted federal officials at northern ports along the coast to speedy action.

On 17 December, the recently captured blockade runner Ella and Annie — which had been hastily manned, armed and sent to sea — caught up with the Chesapeake at Sambro, Nova Scotia. Shortly thereafter, the Northern gunboat Dacotah arrived on the scene; and its commanding officer prevented Ella and Annie from taking the recaptured tug back to Boston, lest such action seriously undermine British–U.S. relations. Instead, to observe diplomatic protocols, he escorted Chesapeake to Halifax where he asked the colonial Admiralty court to restore it to its owner. The court ruled the Confederate attack was illegal and returned SS Chesapeake to its Union owners but the Confederate sympathizers escaped with the help of some Haligonians, creating tensions that received international attention.

=== CSS Tallahassee ===
On 18 August 1864, the Confederate States Ship Tallahassee under the command of John Taylor Wood sailed into Halifax harbour for supplies, coal and to make repairs to its mainmast. Wood could only stay 48 hours under neutrality laws and began loading coal at Woodside, on the Dartmouth shore. Union ships Nansemont and Huron were making their way toward Halifax when Wood slipped out of the harbor at 9 p.m. on 19 August. It is believed he departed by the seldom-used Eastern Passage between McNabs Island and the Dartmouth shore to avoid Union warships in case they had arrived. The channel was narrow and crooked with a shallow tide, so Wood hired a local pilot, Jock Flemming. All the lights were out, but the residents on the Eastern Passage mainland could see the dark hull moving through the water, successfully evading capture.

=== St. Albans Raid ===
The most-controversial incident was the St. Albans Raid. Montreal was used as the secret base for a team of Confederates attempting to launch covert and intelligence operations from Canada against the United States. To finance their cause in October 1864, they robbed three banks in St. Albans, Vermont, killed an American citizen, and escaped with US$170,000. They were pursued across the Canada–U.S. border by Union forces, creating an international incident. The Canadians then arrested the Confederate raiders, but the judge ruled the raid was an authorized Confederate government operation, not a felony, which would have permitted extradition via the Webster–Ashburton Treaty.

Many Americans falsely suspected that the Canadian government knew of the raid ahead of time. There was widespread anger when the raiders were released by a local court in Canada. U.S. Secretary of State William H. Seward let the British government know, "it is impossible to consider those proceedings as either legal, just or friendly towards the United States."

== Canadian volunteers ==
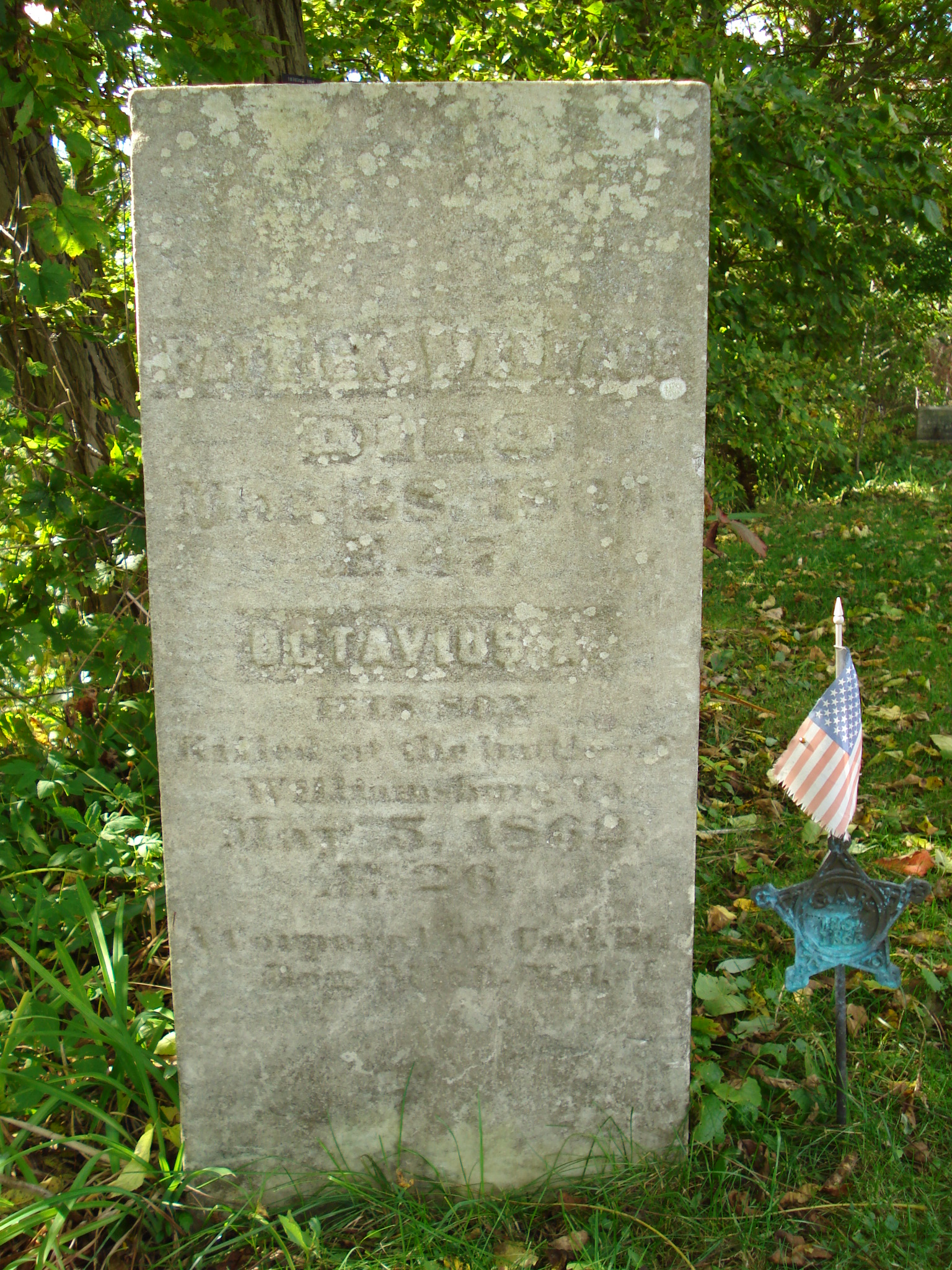
Grave of a Canadian soldier who fought in the US Civil War, at Old St. Thomas Church, St. Thomas, Ontario

The best recent estimates are that between 33,000 and 55,000 men from British North America (BNA) served in the Union army, and a few hundred in the Confederate army. Many of them already lived in the United States and were joined by volunteers signed up in Canada by Union recruiters. About 2,500 of those British North Americans were Black, with most serving in the US Army and a few hundred in the navy.

Canada refused to return about 15,000 American deserters and draft dodgers.

Calixa Lavallée was a French-Canadian musician and Union officer during the American Civil War who later composed the music for "O Canada", which officially became the national anthem of Canada in 1980. In 1857, he moved to the United States and lived in Rhode Island where he enlisted in the 4th Rhode Island Volunteers of the Union army during the American Civil War, attaining the rank of lieutenant.

Canadian-born Edward P. Doherty was a Union Army officer who formed and led the detachment of Union soldiers that captured and killed John Wilkes Booth, the assassin of Lincoln, in a Virginia barn on April 26, 1865, 12 days after Lincoln was fatally shot.

Canadian-born Sarah Emma Edmonds was a noted Union spy.

One of the longest-living Canadians to have fought in the American Civil War was James Beach Moore, who died on August 29, 1931.

Anderson Ruffin Abbott was a Toronto-born son of free people of color who had fled Alabama after their store was ransacked. Canada's first Black physician, he applied for a commission as an assistant surgeon in the Union Army in February 1863, but his offer was evidently not accepted. That April, he applied to be a "medical cadet" in the United States Colored Troops, but was finally accepted as a civilian surgeon under contract. He served in Washington, D.C., from June 1863 to August 1865, first at the Contraband Hospital which became Freedmen's Hospital. He then went to a hospital in Arlington, Virginia. Receiving numerous commendations and becoming popular in Washington society, Abbott was one of only 13 black surgeons to serve in the Civil War, a fact that fostered a friendly relationship between him and the president. On the night of Lincoln's assassination, Abbott accompanied Elizabeth Keckley to the Petersen House and returned to his lodgings that evening. After Lincoln's death, Mary Todd Lincoln presented Abbott with the plaid shawl that Lincoln had worn to his 1861 inauguration.

At least 29 Canadian-born men were awarded the Medal of Honor.

== Economic effects ==
The Civil War period was one of booming economic growth for the BNA colonies. The war in the United States created a huge market for Canada's agricultural and manufactured goods, most of which went to the Union. Maritime shipbuilders and owners prospered in the wartime trade boom.

== Political effects ==
The American Civil War had decisive political effects on the BNA colonies. The tensions between the United States and Britain, which had been ignited by the war and made worse by the Fenian raids, led to concern for the security and independence of the colonies, helping to consolidate momentum for the confederation of the colonies in 1867.

In this regard, the conflict also had an important effect on discussions concerning the nature of the emerging federation. Many Fathers of Confederation concluded that the secessionist war was caused by too much power being given to the states, and thus resolved to create a more centralized federation. It was also believed that too much democracy was a contributing factor and the Canadian system was thus equipped with checks and balances such as the appointed Senate and powers of the British appointed Governor General. The guiding principles of the legislation which created Canada – the British North America Act – were peace, order, and good government. This was a collectivist antithesis to American individualism that became central to Canadian identity.

== See also ==
- Military history of Nova Scotia
- United Kingdom and the American Civil War
- Bahamas and the American Civil War
- France and the American Civil War
- Foreign enlistment in the American Civil War

== Bibliography ==
- Adams, Ephraim Douglass. Great Britain and the American Civil War Archived June 4, 2011, at the Wayback Machine (2 vol. 1925)
- Bourne, Kenneth. British Preparations for War with the North, 1861-1862. The English Historical Review Vol 76 No 301 (Oct 1961) pp 600–632
- Bovey, Wilfrid. "Confederate Agents in Canada During the American Civil War," Canadian Historical Review (1921) 2#1 pp: 46–57 online
- Boyko, John. Blood and Daring: How Canada Fought the American Civil War and Forged a Nation (2013)
- Careless, J.M.S. Brown of the Globe: Volume Two: Statesman of Confederation 1860-1880. (vol 2 1963) on George Brown, Toronto publisher & politician; excerpt
- Crook, David Paul. Diplomacy during the American Civil War (1975), on Canadian diplomacy
- Ferris, Norman B. Desperate Diplomacy: William H. Seward's Foreign Policy, 1861. (1976) 265pp., On Union diplomacy
- Hubbard, Charles M. The Burden of Confederate Diplomacy (1998) 271pp
- Jenkins, Brian. Britain and the War for the Union. (2 vol 1974), by a Canadian scholar
- Jenkins, Danny R. "British North Americans who fought in the American Civil War, 1861-1865," (MA thesis, U. Of Ottawa, 1993), online edition.
- Johnson, Clint. A Vast and Fiendish Plot: The Confederate Attack on New York City. New York: Kensington Publishing Corp. (2010). Discusses a failed plot by Confederates coming from Canada to burn New York City on Election Day 1864.
- Jones, Howard. Abraham Lincoln and a New Birth of Freedom: the Union and Slavery in the Diplomacy of the Civil War, (1999)
- Jones, Preston. "Civil War, Culture War: French Quebec and the American War between the States," Catholic Historical Review. 87#`1 (2001). pp 55+ online edition Archived June 4, 2011, at the Wayback Machine
- Kazar, John D. "The Canadian View of the Confederate Raid on Saint Albans," Vermont History 1964 (1): 255–273,
- Macdonald, Helen Grace. Canadian Public Opinion and the American Civil War (1926)
- Marquis, Greg. Armageddon's Shadow: The Civil War and Canada's Maritime Provinces. (McGill-Queen's University Press, 1998) online
- Mayers, Adam (2003). Dixie & the Dominion: Canada, the Confederacy, and the War for the Union. Toronto: Dundurn. Archived from the original on November 18, 2015 – via Questia.
- Morton, W.L. The Critical Years: The Union of British North America, 1857-1873 (1964)
- Owsley, Frank Lawrence. King Cotton Diplomacy: Foreign Relations of the Confederate States of America (1931)
- Shippee, Lester Burrell. Canadian-American Relations, 1849–1874. Yale University Press, 1939.
- Stouffer, Allen P. "Canadian-American Relations in the Shadow of the Civil War," Dalhousie Review 1977 57(2): 332–346
- Wilson, Dennis K. Justice under Pressure: The Saint Albans Raid and Its Aftermath (1992). 224 pp.
- Winks Robin W. Canada and the United States: The Civil War Years (1971). onlinw, a standard scholarly history
