= Matthew Ryan (politician) =

Canadian politician

The Honourable Matthew Ryan

Stipendiary Magistrate of the Council of the Northwest Territories
- In office January 1, 1876 – August 13, 1883
- Succeeded by: Hugh Richardson

Personal details
- Born: December 24, 1810 St. John's, Colony of Newfoundland
- Died: June 12, 1888 (aged 77) St. Boniface, Manitoba
- Party: Independent
- Occupation: lawyer, judge

Matthew Ryan (December 24, 1810 – June 12, 1888) was a Canadian politician. He served on the 1st Council of the Northwest Territories from 1876 to 1883, as Stipendiary Magistrate.

== Biography ==
Ryan was born in Newfoundland in the 1810, of Irish lineage. He moved to Quebec and was educated in Montreal where he was trained to be a lawyer. Ryan was a member of the bar of Lower Canada, and practiced in Montreal. An "able writer", he also spent some time in journalism. He was a secretary to Sir Francis Hincks and also served in the government of Louis-Hippolyte Lafontaine and Robert Baldwin as a clerk.

Ryan came to the North West Territories in 1873 where he was to adjudicate claims of local First Nations tribes. During his time he was appointed to the North West Territories Council as Stipendiary Magistrate in 1876, and he served until his retirement in 1883. Though not officially a part of a party during his time on the council, he was affiliated with the Liberal Party of Canada.

He died in 1888 at St. Boniface, Manitoba and was buried at the St. Boniface Cemetery.
