= Antonio Prince =

Canadian politician

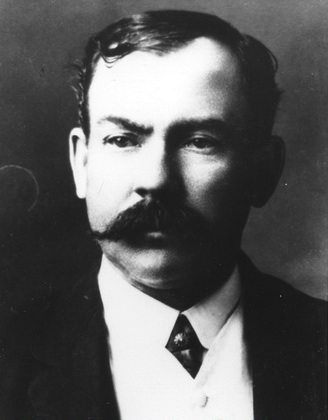
- Antonio Prince, circa 1905

Member of the Legislative Assembly of the Northwest Territories for St. Albert
- In office November 1891 – November 1894
- Preceded by: Samuel Cunningham
- Succeeded by: Daniel Maloney

Personal details
- Born: October 22, 1859 St. Gregoire, Canada East, Province of Canada
- Died: April 8, 1906 (aged 46) Edmonton, Alberta, Canada
- Party: Independent
- Spouse: Georgette Prince
- Occupation: Lawyer

Marie François Antonio Prince (October 22, 1859 – April 8, 1906) was a Canadian politician. He served on the Legislative Assembly of the Northwest Territories for St. Albert from 1891 to 1894.

Born in Quebec, Prince attended Nicolet College and studied law under Sir Wilfrid Laurier. He was later a cattle rancher from Battleford, Saskatchewan, and came to Edmonton in 1887. During his time in the legislature he was a lawyer who lived in Edmonton. He was president of the St. Albert Liberal Association. He was also a former deputy registrar in the Territories' Land Titles' office at Regina. He was elected in 1891 to the Legislative Assembly of the Northwest Territories, and served until his defeat in the 1894 election.

He died suddenly of heart failure in Edmonton in 1906. At the time of his death he was working for the Edmonton land registry, and was survived by his wife and three children.

== Electoral results ==
=== 1891 election ===
November 7, 1891, election
| Name | Vote | % |
| Antonio Prince | 210 | — |
| L. Garneau | n/a | — |
| Daniel Maloney | 183 | — |
| Total Votes | n/a | — |

=== 1894 election ===
October 31, 1894, election
| Name | Vote | % |
| Daniel Maloney | 368 | 53.10% |
| Antonio Prince | 325 | 48.90% |
| Total Votes | 693 | 100% |
