= Bahamas and the American Civil War =

Despite being a territory of the British Empire, the Bahamas was affected by the American Civil War. Much as it was during the Golden Age of Piracy, the Bahamas was a haven for swashbucklers and blockade runners that were aligned with the Confederate States. Although Florida is only 55 miles away, the state then had few ports of any real consequence and so blockade runners would make their trips from Nassau to Charleston, South Carolina, the largest Confederate port on the East Coast.

Grand Bahama Island had a decreasing population in the 19th century because of Nassau, but after the Civil War began in 1861, Grand Bahama Island's population doubled because of the blockade runners' actions.

Nassau was also altered by the war. The first blockade runner docked there on December 5, 1861. By the end of the war, 397 ships sailed from the Confederacy to Nassau, and 588 went from Nassau to the Confederacy. Nassau imports were valued at £234,029, and its exports were worth £157,350. In 1864, at the pinnacle of trade from the Confederacy to Nassau, imports were valued at £5,346,112 and exports at £4,672,398.

Blockade runners would take cotton from Charleston to Nassau, a trip of 560 miles with 48 hours of sailing. As the Union had blockaded all Confederate ports, blockade runners had to be fast. They traded cotton at Nassau for British goods, with the cotton eventually finding its way to British cotton mills.

After the end of the war, the Bahamas fell into hard times and would not recover from until another period of American turmoil. During American Prohibition, Scotch whisky was exported illegally to the United States. Like the end of the Civil War, the end of Prohibition also ended the fortunes of the Bahamas. A considerable number of Bahamians can trace their ancestry back to Southerners who left America before and during the war.

== See also ==
- History of the Bahamas
- Blockade runners of the American Civil War
- United Kingdom in the American Civil War
- Canada in the American Civil War
- African Americans in the American Civil War
- Foreign enlistment in the American Civil War
