= Old St. Thomas Church =

Coordinates: 42.7771°N 81.2060°W

Old St. Thomas Church St. Thomas, Ontario
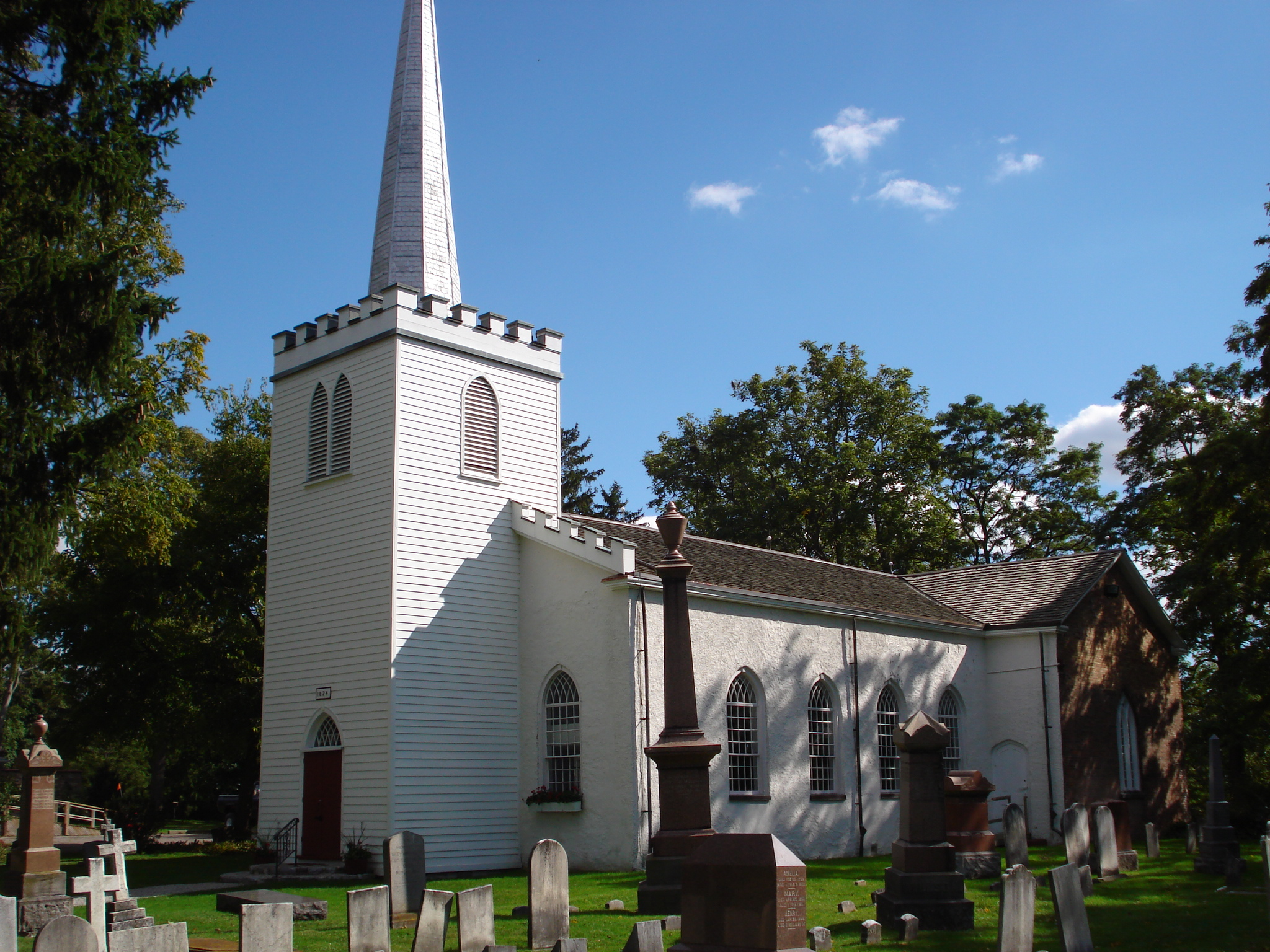
- Old St. Thomas Anglican Church built in 1822
- Old St. Thomas Church St. Thomas, Ontario
- Denomination: Anglican Church of Canada

Administration
- Province: Ecclesiastical Province of Ontario
- Diocese: Anglican Diocese of Huron
- Parish: Chapel of ease administered by Trinity Anglican Church St. Thomas

Built between 1822 and 1824, the St. Thomas Anglican Church, today called the Old St. Thomas Church, is one of the oldest structures in St. Thomas, Ontario The Church was continuously used between its founding and 1877. The church was made a designated heritage property in 1982.

== History ==
The church was founded on land donated by Captain Daniel Rapelje, the founder of St. Thomas. It is considered an early example of North American pioneer architecture. The church was completed in 1824 and tower was added in 1825 with the aid of Col. Thomas Talbot. One of the earliest churches in the Talbot Settlement, the building is an example of Gothic Revival architecture.

The first incumbent, the Rev. Alexander Mackintosh, served from 1824 to 1829, was also the village’s schoolmaster. The congregation began with only 12 parishioners in 1825 but quickly grew to 41 by 1827. In 1833 the church was consecrated. By 1840 the church was enlarged. In 1877 the church congregation moved to the Trinity Anglican church in St. Thomas. Trinity Anglican Church has amalgamated with St. John's Anglican Church and the combined congregations are now known as The New St. Thomas Church. By 1982 the church site was made an Ontario heritage site and in 1986 the church was restored and renovated.

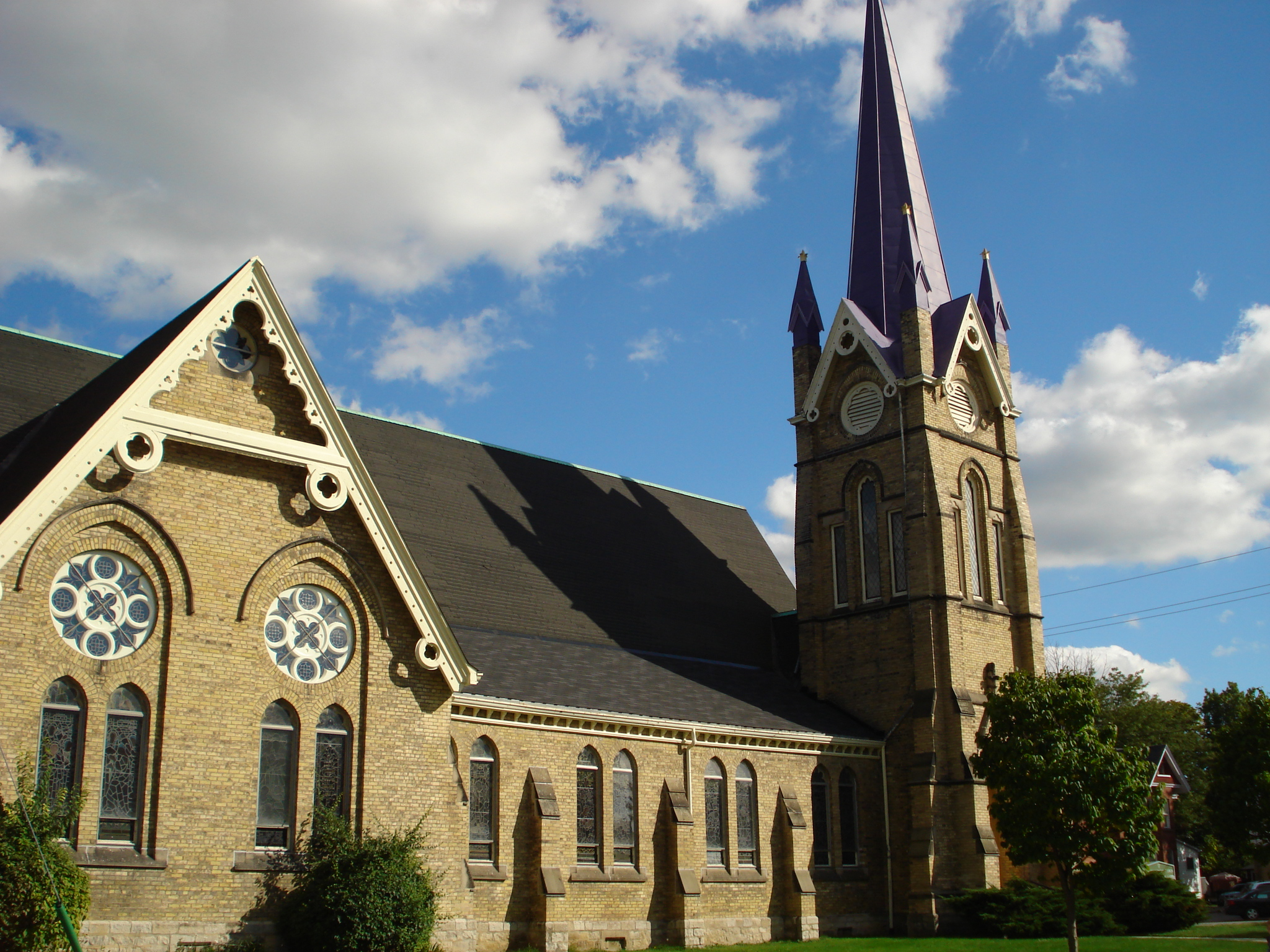
In 1877 the congregation built a larger church, Trinity

== Famous grave sites ==
The church is surrounded by a pioneer cemetery with many notable grave sites both nationally recognized and locally significant. The oldest grave site is that of Daniel Rapelje’s son George in 1819; the newest are modern. Nationally significant sites include that of Judge Hugh Richardson, who in 1885 sentenced Louis Riel to death. Locally significant folklore tells of the story of the "witch’s grave" (in fact, the grave of a woman named Maria Baldwin, who died in 1863, and who was not in life accused of witchcraft), the Irish family curse of the Chisholm family where 7 family members died within 7 years, and that of Canadian soldier Octavius Wallace, who fought in the American Civil War as a corporal of the 2nd Michigan Volunteer Infantry, and died at the Battle of Williamsburg in 1862.

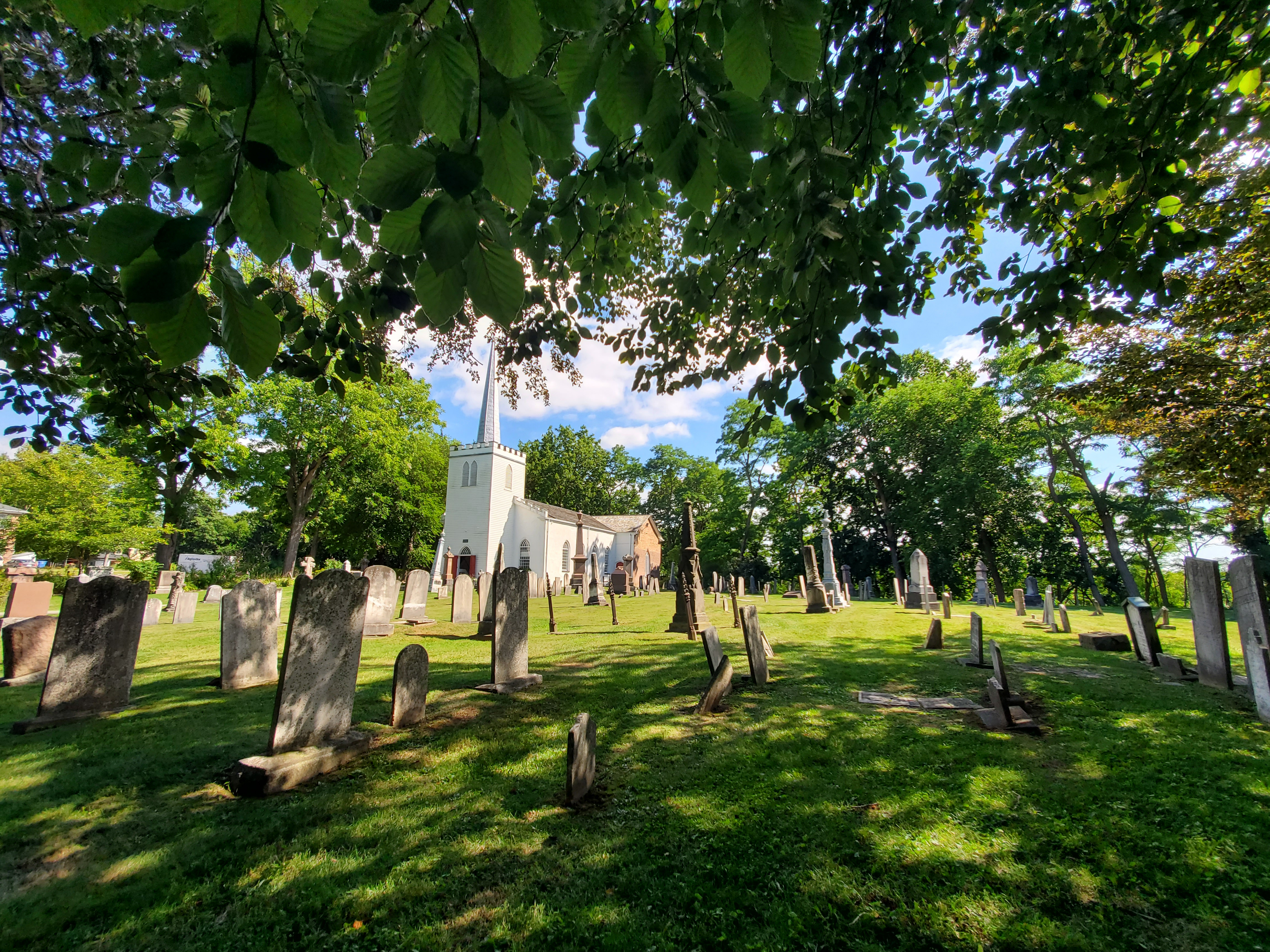
Cemetery at the old St Thomas Anglican Church, St Thomas, Ontario.
