= Charles Marshallsay =

Canadian politician

Member of the Council of the Northwest Territories for Broadview
- In office September 16, 1885 – November 5, 1887
- Preceded by: John Claude Hamilton

Personal details
- Born: 1843 Yeovil, Somerset, England
- Died: November 5, 1887 (aged 43–44) Regina, North West Territories
- Party: Independent
- Spouse: Isabella Robertson Blaikie
- Occupation: farmer, merchant

Charles Marshallsay (1843 – November 5, 1887) was an English-born Canadian politician. He served on the 1st Council of the Northwest Territories for Broadview from 1885 to 1887.

Marshallsay was born at Yeovil, Somerset, England, the son of Charles Marshallsay and received his education at Godalming, Surrey. He also attended Battersea College (where he was a Queen's scholar), Saltley College and a school of art in South Kensington, London. He then entered the teaching profession, but in 1868 would enter the revenue department, raising to be a divisional officer. In this capacity he travelled around to England, Scotland and Wales. Upon his arrival in Canada, he was one of the first settlers at Whitewood, Saskatchewan.

He served as a customs officer, and as a merchant and farmer. Also a member of his local education board, he was appointed a justice of the peace in 1884. In 1872, he married Isabella Robertson Blaikie.

He was elected in 1885 to the Council of the North West Territories, and served until his death on November 5, 1887. During his time on the council he compiled the North West Territories School Act of 1885, and lobbied for a bridges to cross the Qu'Appelle River and Pipestone River. He resided at Whitewood, Saskatchewan, where he was active in the Church of England, and ran an accounting office. He also farmed in Qu'Appelle. He died of typhoid fever at Regina in 1887.

== Electoral results ==
=== 1885 election ===
1885 Northwest Territories election
Name	Vote	%
Charles Marshallsay	187	53.28%
James Reilly	164	46.72%
Total Votes	351	100%
