= John Claude Hamilton =

Canadian politician (1854–1908)

John Claude Campbell Hamilton

Member of the Council of the Northwest Territories for Broadview
- In office 31 August 1883 – 16 September 1885
- Succeeded by: Charles Marshallsay

Personal details
- Born: 17 February 1854 Edinburgh, Scotland
- Party: Independent
- Occupation: farmer

John Claude Campbell Hamilton (17 February 1854 – 19 June 1908) was a Canadian politician. He served on the 1st Council of the Northwest Territories for Broadview from 1883 to 1885.

Hamilton was born in Edinburgh, Scotland. After receiving education at Merchiston Castle School, and in Godesberg, Germany, he later lived in Sundrum, Ayr, Scotland. He was a justice of the peace and farmer in County Ayr. Hamilton was also a lieutenant in the Ayrshire Yeomanry.

He was elected in 1883 to the Council of the North West Territories, and retired at the next election, in 1885.

== Electoral results ==
=== 1883 election ===
31 August 1883 by-election
Name	Vote	%
John Claude Hamilton	91	55.82%
John Leckie	72	44.18%
Total Votes	163	100%
