= James Davidson Geddes =

Canadian politician

Member of the Council of the Northwest Territories for Calgary
- In office 1884–1886
- Succeeded by: John D. Lauder; Hugh Cayley

Personal details
- Born: c. 1844 United States
- Died: March 30, 1895 (aged 50–51) Calgary, North West Territories
- Occupation: Accountant

James Davidson Geddes (c. 1844 – March 30, 1895) was a Canadian accountant, rancher and politician who served a term in the Northwest Territories Legislature.

== Early life ==
Geddes, originally from the United States, lived in Galt, Ontario and worked as an accountant for the Merchants Bank. He married his wife, Eliza Fanning at the Trinity Church in Galt on June 12, 1866.

He moved out west in 1882 to the District of Alberta in the Northwest Territories. His ranch was established on land where the Ghost River intersects the Bow River and in 1885 he had 200 head of cattle. The land is now part of Ghost Reservoir Provincial Park.

== Political career ==
Geddes ran for public office to a seat on the North-West Legislative Council in a by-election held on June 28, 1884. (The Calgary NWT district had never existed before and was filled by itself at time of creation in 1884.) Geddes was the first member of the NWT council to be elected in Calgary. Geddes defeated James Oswald in a hotly contested election, when emotions were inflamed by the Nor'Wester newspaper, newly started in Calgary. Geddes did not run for re-election when his term was up in 1886.

Geddes died of influenza in March 1895.
