= St. Albert (territorial electoral district) =

Former territorial electoral district in the North-West Territories, Canada

St. Albert was a territorial electoral district that existed twice in the North-West Territories, Canada. The first district existed from 1885 until 1888. The district was recreated in 1891 and was abolished in 1905.

== History ==
Members of the Legislative Assembly for St. Albert
| Assembly | Years | Member | Party |
|---|---|---|---|
| 1st Council | 1885–1888 | Samuel Cunningham | Independent |
See Edmonton 1888–1891
| 2nd | 1891–1894 | Antonio Prince | Independent |
| 3rd | 1894–1898 | Daniel Maloney | Independent |
| 4th | 1898–1902 | Fredric Villeneuve | Independent |
| 5th | 1902–1903 | Daniel Maloney | Independent |
| 5th | 1903 | Vacant | |
| 5th | 1903–1905 | Louis Lambert | Independent |
See St. Albert (Alberta) 1905–present

The electoral district was created by Royal Proclamation in 1885. The electoral district was named after the settlement of St. Albert situated just northwest of Edmonton. The first incarnation of the district was abolished in 1888 after it was merged to become part of the Edmonton electoral district under the North-West Representation Act 1888. Edmonton would be broken up again after dissolution of the 1st North-West Legislative Assembly in 1891 and the district recreated. The electoral district was abolished in 1905 when Alberta and Saskatchewan were created.

== See also ==
- List of Northwest Territories territorial electoral districts
- Canadian provincial electoral districts
