= Edmonton (territorial electoral district) =

Former territorial electoral district in the North-West Territories, Canada

Northwest Territories electoral district

Defunct territorial electoral district
- Legislature: Legislative Assembly of the Northwest Territories
- District created: 1883
- District abolished: 1905
- First contested: 1883 by-election
- Last contested: 1902 general election

Edmonton was a territorial electoral district for the Legislative Assembly of the North-West Territories, Canada.

== History ==
The riding was created by royal proclamation in 1883, the second district to elect a representative to the North-West Legislative Assembly, and the first within the Alberta provisional district.

In 1885 the riding of St. Albert was split off from Edmonton's northwestern area, but in 1888 two ridings were combined again, with Edmonton briefly becoming a two-member district. St. Albert was re-established in 1891, and Edmonton again elected only one member. Strathcona was also split off from Edmonton's southern part in 1902.

When Alberta became a province in 1905, the district continued on as Edmonton (Alberta).

== Members of the Legislative Assembly (MLAs) ==
Members of the Legislative Assembly for Edmonton
Assembly	Years	Seat 1		Seat 2	
Assembly	Years	Member	Party	Member	Party
1st Council	1883–1885	Frank Oliver	Independent	—	
1st Council	18851888	Herbert Wilson	Independent	—	
1st	1888–1891	Herbert Wilson	Independent	Frank Oliver	Independent
2nd	1891-1894	Frank Oliver	Independent	—	
3rd	1894-1896	Frank Oliver	Independent	—	
3rd	1896	Vacant		—	
3rd	1896–1898	Matthew McCauley	Independent	—	
4th	1898–1902	Matthew McCauley	Independent	—	
5th	1902–1905	Richard Secord	Independent	—	
See Edmonton (Alberta) 1905-1909

Edmonton elected its first representative in the North-West Assembly, Edmonton Bulletin founder Frank Oliver, in a by-election in 1883. Although the Legislative Council was not dissolved, elections were held in most of the North-West Territories in 1885, and Oliver was defeated by local physician and businessman Herbert Charles Wilson, who became speaker of the Assembly.

The first general election of the territory was held in 1888, after the dissolution of the Legislative Council. This was the only election in which Edmonton was a double-member district, and both Wilson and Oliver were elected. Wilson retired from politics when the Assembly was dissolved in 1891.

As Edmonton was now a single-member district again, Oliver remained MLA for another five years, with no challengers in the 1891 or 1894 elections. He resigned to run for the House of Commons seat for Alberta, which he successfully captured.

The resulting by-election was a close race between former Edmonton mayor Matthew McCauley and the future premier of Alberta Alexander Rutherford, which McCauley won. Both men contested the seat again in the general election of 1898, but McCauley triumphed a second time.

In 1902, however, McCauley was defeated by former alderman Richard Secord. While MLA, Secord challenged Frank Oliver for his House of Commons seat in the 1904 federal election, but was defeated. He did not seek re-election when Alberta was created in 1905 (although both Rutherford and McCauley went on to become MLAs in the new province).

== Election results ==
=== Elections in the 1880s ===
North-West Territories territorial by-election, May 29, 1883
Party	Candidate	Votes	%
Independent	Frank Oliver	155	58.94%
Independent	Francis Lamoureux	94	35.74%
Independent	Stewart D. Mulkins	14	5.32%
Total votes		263	
Source(s) "North-West Territories: Council and Legislative Assembly, 1876-1905" (PDF). Saskatchewan Archives. Archived from the original (PDF) on 28 September 2007.

1885 North-West Territories general election
Party	Candidate	Votes	%
Independent	Herbert Charles Wilson	120	51.95%
Independent	Frank Oliver	111	48.05%
Total votes		231	
Source(s) "North-West Territories: Council and Legislative Assembly, 1876-1905" (PDF). Saskatchewan Archives. Archived from the original (PDF) on 28 September 2007.

1888 North-West Territories general election
Party	Candidate	Votes	%	Elected
Independent	Herbert Charles Wilson	395	32.54%	✓
Independent	Frank Oliver	350	28.83%	✓
Independent	Samuel Cunningham	319	26.28%	
Independent	Daniel Maloney	150	12.35%	
Total votes		1,214		
Source(s) "North-West Territories: Council and Legislative Assembly, 1876-1905" (PDF). Saskatchewan Archives. Archived from the original (PDF) on 28 September 2007.

=== Elections in the 1890s ===
1891 North-West Territories general election
Party	Candidate	Votes
Independent	Frank Oliver	Acclaimed
Source(s) "North-West Territories: Council and Legislative Assembly, 1876-1905" (PDF). Saskatchewan Archives. Archived from the original (PDF) on 28 September 2007.

1894 North-West Territories general election
Party	Candidate	Votes
Independent	Frank Oliver	Acclaimed
Source(s) "North-West Territories: Council and Legislative Assembly, 1876-1905" (PDF). Saskatchewan Archives. Archived from the original (PDF) on 28 September 2007.

North-West Territories territorial by-election, August 4, 1896
Party	Candidate	Votes	%
Independent	Matthew McCauley	567	58.64%
Independent	Alexander Cameron Rutherford	400	41.36%
Total votes		967	
Source(s) "North-West Territories: Council and Legislative Assembly, 1876-1905" (PDF). Saskatchewan Archives. Archived from the original (PDF) on 28 September 2007.

1898 North-West Territories general election
Party	Candidate	Votes	%
Independent	Matthew McCauley	582	48.83%
Independent	Alexander Cameron Rutherford	498	41.77%
Independent	Harry Havelock Robertson	112	9.40%
Total votes		1,192	
Source(s) "North-West Territories: Council and Legislative Assembly, 1876-1905" (PDF). Saskatchewan Archives. Archived from the original (PDF) on 28 September 2007.

=== 1902 election ===
1902 North-West Territories general election
Party	Candidate	Votes	%
Independent	Richard Secord	527	47.96%
Independent	Matthew McCauley	519	46.97%
Independent	Don Brox	59	5.07%
Total votes		1,105	
Source(s) "North-West Territories: Council and Legislative Assembly, 1876-1905" (PDF). Saskatchewan Archives. Archived from the original (PDF) on 28 September 2007.

== See also ==
- List of Northwest Territories territorial electoral districts
- Canadian provincial electoral districts
- Edmonton Alberta provincial electoral district
- Edmonton federal electoral district
