= Moosomin (territorial electoral district) =

Former territorial electoral district in the North-West Territories, Canada

Moosomin was a territorial electoral district in North-West Territories, Canada that came into existence by Royal Proclamation in 1885 and was abolished when Alberta and Saskatchewan were created in 1905.

== History ==
The electoral district was mandated to return a single member to the Legislative Assembly of the Northwest Territories. The electoral district was named after the town of Moosomin, North-West Territories and the town's name sake Chief Moosomin, a well known leader of the Cree in the late 19th century.

== Members of the Legislative Assembly (MLAs) ==
Name	Elected	Left office
Spencer Bedford	1885	1888
John Ryerson Neff	1888	1898
Alexander S. Smith	1898	1905

== Election results ==
=== 1885 ===
1885 North-West Territories election
Name	Vote	%
Spencer Bedford	Acclaimed	

=== 1888 ===
1888 North-West Territories general election
Name	Vote	%
John Ryerson Neff	Acclaimed	

=== 1891 election ===
1891 North-West Territories general election
Name	Vote	%
John Ryerson Neff	Acclaimed	

=== 1894 ===
1894 North-West Territories general election
Name	Vote	%
John Ryerson Neff	561	57.78%
Neil G. McCallum	410	42.22%
Total votes	971	100%

=== 1898 ===
1898 North-West Territories general election
Name	Vote	%
Alexander S. Smith	614	60.91%
John Ryerson Neff	392	39.09%
Total votes	1,008	100%

=== 1902 ===
1902 North-West Territories general election
Name	Vote	%
Alexander S. Smith	525	60.69%
John McCurdy	340	39.31%
Total votes	865	100%

== See also ==
- List of Northwest Territories territorial electoral districts
- Canadian provincial electoral districts
