= Day Hort MacDowall =

Canadian politician

Day Hort MacDowall (March 6, 1850 – October 28, 1927) was a politician from old Northwest Territories, Canada.

Born in Carruth House, Renfrewshire, Scotland, MacDowall immigrated to Canada in 1879. He was elected as a member of the Legislative Assembly of Northwest Territories in 1883 and served until 1885. He was an early prominent resident of Prince Albert, Saskatchewan and connected to the Conservative Party of Canada.

He was elected to the House of Commons of Canada in 1887 and re-elected in 1891 for the Saskatchewan (Provisional District) defeating the father of famed author Lucy Maud Montgomery. He served until 1896.

The village of MacDowall, Saskatchewan is named after him.

Legislative Assembly of the Northwest Territories
Preceded by Lawrence Clarke	MLA Lorne; 1883-1885	Succeeded by Owen Hughes
Parliament of Canada
Preceded by New District	Member of Parliament Saskatchewan (Provisional District); 1887-1896	Succeeded by Wilfrid Laurier
