= Spencer Bedford =

Canadian politician (1851–1933)

Member of the Council of the North-West Territories for Moosomin
- In office September 15, 1885 – June 30, 1888
- Succeeded by: John Ryerson Neff

Personal details
- Born: February 1, 1851 Busted, Sussex, England
- Died: December 15, 1933 (aged 82) Winnipeg, Manitoba, Canada
- Party: Independent
- Occupation: farmer

Spencer Argyle Bedford (February 1, 1851 – December 15, 1933) was an English-born Canadian politician. He served on the 1st Council of the North-West Territories for Moosomin from 1885 to 1888.

Bedford was born at Busted, Sussex, England in 1851, the son of J. Bedford, and was raised in the vicinity of the English Channel. He came to Canada in 1877 and settled in Manitoba, purchasing land there. He worked for land offices as well as a booster for the North-West Territories, to encourage immigration there, drawing settlers to the Pembina Mountains and Rock Lake areas. Bedford was also a land inspector, for Scottish Ontario, the British Canadian Loan Company, and the Canadian Northwest Land Company. He resided in Moosomin where he farmed. He married Minnie Bolton in 1880. His wife would die in the 1918 flu pandemic.

He was acclaimed in 1885 to the Council of the North-West Territories, and retired at the next election, in 1888. Upon his retirement he was named the first superintendent of the Brandon Experimental Farm in Brandon, Manitoba, a position which he would serve for 20 years.

Bedford later was Professor of Field Husbandry at the Manitoba Agricultural College in Winnipeg, Chairman of the Manitoba Weed Commission, and was appointed the position of Deputy Minister of Agriculture in the Manitoba government. He is a member of the Manitoba Agricultural Hall of Fame, and received an honorary doctorate from the University of Manitoba in 1921. He died at his Winnipeg home in 1933.

== Electoral results ==
=== 1885 election ===
1885 North-West Territories election
Name	Vote	%
Spencer Bedford	Acclaimed	
