= Lorne (electoral district) =

Former territorial electoral district in the North-West Territories, Canada

Coordinates: 53°12′N 105°45′W

Northwest Territories electoral district

Defunct territorial electoral district
- Legislature: Legislative Assembly of the Northwest Territories
- District created: 1881
- District abolished: 1888
- First contested: 1881
- Last contested: 1885

Lorne was an electoral district that existed in the District of Saskatchewan, North-West Territories from 1880 until 1888. The district was one of the first three electoral districts in the Territories. It was created by statutory proclamation in 1880. Of the three electoral districts proclaimed, it was the only one to actually have an election held in it.

Under the North-West Territories Act 1880 the district was mandated at its inception to return a single member to the North-West Territories Legislature under the first past the post electoral system. The district was named in the honour of then-Governor General, the Marquess of Lorne. Lorne toured through the North-West Territories just after the electoral district was created in 1881.

The electoral district ceased to exist following electoral redistribution before the 1888 North-West Territories general election was called. The redistribution was due to a population boom in the area caused by an influx of settlers. The electoral district was redistributed and split between the electoral districts of Batoche and Prince Albert. During the nine years the district existed, it returned three members through three elections who served roughly three-year terms.

== Overview ==
The electoral district was one of three proclaimed by Lieutenant-Governor David Laird on November 13, 1880, under the authority of the North-West Territories Act. The other two electoral districts were Salisbury, named after the Marquess of Salisbury and Kimberley name after the Lord of Kimberley. Kimberley's contribution to the North-West Territories was transferring the Canadian Arctic Archipelago to Canada on September 1, 1880.

The electoral district was created with the provision to cover an area of 1,000 square miles (2,600 km^{2}) and have a population of 1,000 electors. The major population centres in the electoral district at the time of creation were Prince Albert, and Fort Carlton. The land around the district boomed due to a high rate of settlement in that period. The cause of this was due to the possibility of the Canadian Pacific transcontinental railway line being built through the area.

The North-West Territories political system used at this time was run by an early form of consensus government. Candidates stood for election independent of the political parties that exist in other provinces and territories and the federal level within Canada. The government had not yet developed to the point of being a Responsible Government as the majority of members were appointed and not elected. The district was served by three representatives during its eight-year history.

== Members of the Legislative Assembly (MLAs) ==
Name	Elected	Left office
Lawrence Clarke	1881	1883
Day Hort MacDowall	1883	1885
Owen Hughes	1885	1888

== Election results ==
=== 1881 ===
The 1881 by-election held on March 23, 1881 was a pivotal milestone towards Responsible Government being attained in the North-West Territories. The election marked the first time the provision of the North-West Territories Act 1880 that allowed for an electoral district to be proclaimed if an area the size of 1,000 square miles (2,600 km^{2}) had 1,000 residents had been activated.

March 23, 1881 by-election
Name	Vote	%
Lawrence Clarke	250	63.61%
Henry Stewart Moore	143	36.39%
Total votes	393	100%

The election was conducted by voice vote, a qualified elector would tell the returning officer at a polling station who he was going to vote for and the results would be tallied. Under the terms of the Act eligible electors were males who had reached the age of majority, which was 21 years of age at that time. The act specified that electors must be bona fide males who were not aliens or unenfranchised Indians. Electors must also have resided in the territory for at least 12 months to the day of the writ being dropped.

The election commenced when Lieutenant-Governor David Laird dropped the writ on 1881. The election was contested by two candidates, Lawrence Clarke who was a fur trader and Chief Factor of the District of Saskatchewan for the Hudson's Bay Company. Clarke's opponent was Henry Stewart Moore a local French speaking businessman from Prince Albert who had been operating a flour mill since 1875.

Clarke held a big advantage in the campaign as he was supported by the Métis who had been looking for someone to locally represent them in the Legislature since the territory was formed in 1870. Clarke had also built his popularity and name recognition as a prominent fur trader. On election day Clarke carried the district winning a solid victory. He defeated Moore winning nearly 64% of popular vote. His resounding win would make him the first elected member to sit on the Northwest Territories council.

=== 1883 ===
Nearing the end of his term in office Clarke decided not to run for re-election in 1883. He was losing too much support due to his ties with the Hudson's Bay Company. The electorate suspected him of working under the influence of his office to locate important government offices on the land owned by the company. Two completely new candidates ran in the 1883 election, Captain Day Hort MacDowall and Dr. Andrew Everett Porter.

June 5, 1883 by-election
Name	Vote	%
Day Hort MacDowall	279	69.92%
Andrew Porter	120	30.08%
Total votes	399	100%

Andrew Porter was famous for being the first registered private practicing medical doctor in the history of the North-West Territories. He originally settled in Prince Albert in 1878. MacDowall campaigned by appealing to the concerns of the Métis who comprised the largest demographic in the district. He promised them that he would go to the Federal Government with their demands for better representation. He also helped win support by donating $1,100 out of pocket towards the construction of a new church for the community of Batoche. MacDowall's campaign efforts and donation proved to be very popular.

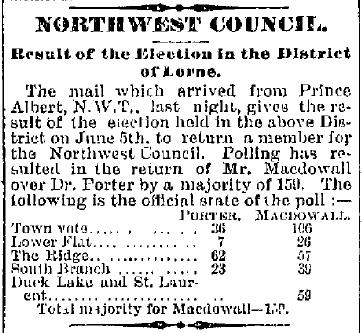
Official results published June 20, 1883

MacDowall's appeal for representation translated into a landslide victory on election day. On June 5, 1883 he defeated Andrew Porter capturing nearly 70% of the popular vote. His win was the largest majority of the three elections held in the electoral district.

The official results for the race showed MacDowall won big in most of the polls, winning four out of five. Porter's support was concentrated in The Ridge where he won his only poll. MacDowall swept the south end of the district winning a shut out in the Métis communities of Duck Lake and St. Laurent de Grandin. Along with the shut out he held strong support in the rest of the riding, with his biggest single vote tally of votes coming from within the town of Prince Albert.

=== 1885 ===
The 1885 election in this district was held on September 17, 1885 as part of the 1885 North-West Territories election. This was the first major election held in the North-West Territories. The election grouped together a number of old districts that had been coming up for renewal on their three-year cycle and by-elections in new districts that were created by a population boom of settlers moving into the territory.

1885 North-West Territories election
Name	Vote	%
Owen Hughes	141	51.46%
Andrew Porter	133	48.54%
Total votes	274	100%

Incumbent MacDowall, had played a major role in subduing the North-West Rebellion at the end of his term in office. He would not run for re-election instead choosing to campaign for a seat in the House of Commons of Canada. Dr. Porter attempted to win a seat by running for office a second time. Porter was challenged by Captain Owen E. Hughes, a business man from Duck Lake. Hughes had been the captain of the Prince Albert militia unit that was disbanded by the Federal Government prior to the start of the North-West Rebellion. Many of his former unit, including his lieutenant, Gabriel Dumont, were among the Metis who drove the loyalist forces back at the Battle of Fish Creek.

On election day, despite increasing his popular share of the vote over the 1883 election even with lower turnout, Porter was defeated by Hughes. The race was very tight and hotly contested nearly ending in a tie vote. Hughes captured the electoral district by a margin of eight votes winning just over 51% of the popular vote.

== See also ==
- List of Northwest Territories territorial electoral districts
- Canadian provincial electoral districts
