= David Jelly =

Canadian politician

David F. Jelly
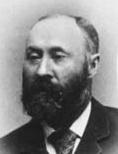
- D. F. Jelly, 1891

MLA for Regina
- In office 1885–1888
- Preceded by: William White
- Succeeded by: John Secord

Personal details
- Born: September 28, 1847 North Dorchester Township, Canada West
- Died: December 27, 1911 (aged 64) Queensland, Australia

David Finlay Jelly (September 28, 1847 – December 27, 1911) was an educator, farmer and political figure in the Northwest Territories, Canada. He represented Regina from 1885 to 1888 in the 1st Council of the Northwest Territories and North Regina from 1888 to 1894 in the Legislative Assembly of the Northwest Territories as an Independent member.

He was born in North Dorchester Township, Middlesex County, Canada West, the son of William Jelly and his wife Mary (née Finlay). He was educated in Harrietsville, London and Toronto. In 1877, Jelly married Ida Findlay. He taught school for five years in Harrietsville and then served as managing director for the Belmont Flax Company. He came to the Northwest Territories, where he farmed and raised livestock, in 1882.

It is unknown when he arrived in Brisbane, Queensland, but he was admitted to Dunwich Benevolent Asylum in September 1911. On December 27, 1911, he jumped from a jetty and drowned. He was buried in an unmarked grave in the Dunwich Cemetery. Admission records for this time frame are missing.
