= William White (Canadian politician) =

Canadian politician (1856–1953)

Member of the Council of the Northwest Territories for Regina
- In office August 13, 1883 – August 12, 1885
- Succeeded by: David Jelly

Personal details
- Born: April 29, 1856 Hamilton, Canada West
- Died: May 9, 1953 (aged 97)
- Party: Independent
- Occupation: lawyer

William White, Q.C. (April 29, 1856 – May 9, 1953) was a Canadian politician. He served on the 1st Council of the Northwest Territories for Regina from 1883 to 1885.

White was born in 1856 at Hamilton, Canada West, the son of Thomas White. After receiving education at the Upper Canada College and the University of Toronto, he became a lawyer. Though he served on the Northwest Territories Council as an independent as it was non-partisan, White affiliated himself later with the Conservative Party of Canada. He would practice law at Moosomin where he was also a prosecutor. He later moved to British Columbia, Yukon and England. In 1887, he married Frances Louisa Cholerton-Hall.

He was elected in 1883 to the Council of the North West Territories, and retired at the next election, in 1885.

== Electoral results ==
=== 1883 election ===
August 13, 1883 by-election
Name	Vote	%
William White	89	59.33%
Joseph O. Boucher	31	20.67%
Edward Carss	30	20.00%
Total Votes	150	100%
