= Robert Crawford (Canadian politician) =

Canadian politician

Member of the Council of the Northwest Territories for Qu'Appelle
- In office 14 October 1886 – 30 June 1888
- Preceded by: Thomas Wesley Jackson
- Succeeded by: William Sutherland

Personal details
- Born: 11 August 1834 Port Glasgow, Scotland
- Died: 22 September 1897 (aged 63) Indian Head, North West Territories
- Party: Independent
- Occupation: merchant, postmaster

Robert Crawford (11 August 1834 – 22 September 1897) was a Scottish-born Canadian politician. He served on the 1st Council of the Northwest Territories for Qu'Appelle from 1886 to 1888.

Crawford was born in Port Glasgow, the son of Andrew Crawford. After receiving his education at Greenock, he came to Canada in 1849. He initially farmed at the Island of Montreal, but would later gain employment with the Hudson's Bay Company as a clerk in 1854. He earned a commission in 1867 as Chief Trader at Lindsay, Ontario, then worked as Chief Trader or Factor at Nipigon, Ontario, Red Rock, Ontario and Fort Chimo until 1877 when he retired. He moved to Brockville, Ontario where he lived until 1882, when he moved west to Indian Head, North West Territories. At Indian Head he operated a general store, Crawford & Robinson. He married Elizabeth Miles, the daughter of Robert Seaborn Miles, a fellow Hudson's Bay Company employee, in August 1863. He resided at Indian Head where he operated his store and was also the postmaster. During the 1885 North-West Rebellion, he was Paymaster to the Commissariat and Transport Service.

He was elected in 1886 to the Council of the North West Territories, triggered by the resignation of Thomas Wesley Jackson. Crawford retired at the next election, in 1888.

== Electoral results ==
=== 1886 election ===
14 October 1886 by-election
Name	Vote	%
Robert Crawford	332	53.38%
George Davidson	290	46.62%
Total Votes	622	100%
