= Calgary (territorial electoral district) =

Former electoral district in the North-West Territories, Canada

Coordinates: 51°02′42″N 114°03′26″W

Northwest Territories electoral district

Defunct territorial electoral district
- Legislature: Legislative Assembly of the Northwest Territories
- District created: 1884
- District abolished: 1894
- First contested: 1884
- Last contested: 1891

Calgary was a territorial electoral district for the Legislative Assembly of the North-West Territories, Canada. The riding was created by royal proclamation in 1884, and split into East Calgary, West Calgary, and High River in 1894.

Calgary 1884 Boundaries
Bordering districts
North	East	West	South
Legal description from Ordinances of the North-West Territories 1884
Namely: West of Fourth Principal Meridian: Range XXVIII, Townships numbered 19, 20, 21, 22 and 23; Range XXIX, Township numbered 18 and Fractional Townships numbered 19, 20, 21, 22, 23, 24 and 25; Range XXX, Fractional Township numbered 18.; West of Fifth Principal Meridian: Range I, Townships numbered 18, 19, 20, 21, 22, 23, 24 and 25; Range II, Townships numbered 18, 19, 20, 21, 22, 24 and 26; Range III, Township numbered 25.

== Calgary Members of the Legislative Assembly (MLAs) ==
Members of the Territorial Council / Legislative Assembly for Calgary
Assembly	Years	Seat 1		Seat 2	
Assembly	Years	Member	Party	Member	Party
1st Council	1884–1886	James Geddes	Independent	—	
1st Council	1886–1888	John Lauder	Independent	Hugh Cayley	Independent
1st	1888–1891	John Lineham	Independent	Hugh Cayley	Independent
2nd	1891–1894	John Lineham	Independent	Hugh Cayley	Independent
See East Calgary, West Calgary and High River 1894–1905

== History of the Calgary district ==
When the Calgary district was created in 1884, it elected accountant and rancher James Geddes as its representative in the 1st Council of the North-West Territories. Although most of the represented parts of the Territories held elections in 1885, Geddes' term was not over after just one year. His term ended in 1886.

In 1886 the Calgary district was made a double-member district, with two members elected by the plurality block voting method. Four candidates contested the by-election, with North-West Rebellion veteran John Lauder and Calgary Herald publisher Hugh Cayley becoming Members of the Territorial Council. Lauder retired after two years.

When the Council was dissolved and the Territories' first general election was held in 1888, three challengers ran in Calgary. Cayley was re-elected alongside newcomer John Lineham, who won the most votes of the three men.

In the second general election, there were no challengers, and Cayley and Lineham were re-elected by acclamation.

The Calgary district was split into East Calgary, West Calgary and High River in 1894. Cayley retired from politics, while Lineham won re-election in High River.

== Election results ==
=== 1891 election ===
1891 North-West Territories general election
Party	Candidate	Votes
Independent	John Lineham	Acclaimed
Independent	Hugh Cayley	Acclaimed
Source(s) "North-West Territories: Council and Legislative Assembly, 1876-1905" (PDF). Saskatchewan Archives. Archived from the original (PDF) on 28 September 2007.

=== 1888 election ===
Each voter could cast two votes.

1888 North-West Territories general election
Party	Candidate	Votes	%	Elected
Independent	John Lineham	809	43.80%	✓
Independent	Hugh Cayley	634	34.44%	✓
Independent	James A. Reilly	404	21.76%	
Total votes		1,847		
Source(s) "North-West Territories: Council and Legislative Assembly, 1876-1905" (PDF). Saskatchewan Archives. Archived from the original (PDF) on 28 September 2007.

=== 1886 by-election — July 16, 1886 ===
Each voter could cast two votes.

North-West Territories territorial by-election, July 14, 1886
Party	Candidate	Votes	%	Elected
Independent	John D. Lauder	232	33.62%	✓
Independent	Hugh Cayley	195	28.25%	✓
Independent	Augustus Carney	164	23.77%	
Independent	Simon Jackson Hogg	99	14.36%	
Total votes		690		
Source(s) "North-West Territories: Council and Legislative Assembly, 1876-1905" (PDF). Saskatchewan Archives. Archived from the original (PDF) on 28 September 2007.

=== 1884 election ===
North-West Territories territorial by-election, June 28, 1884
Party	Candidate	Votes	%
Independent	James Davidson Geddes	100	53.19%
Independent	James Kidd Oswald	88	46.81%
Total votes		188	
Source(s) "North-West Territories: Council and Legislative Assembly, 1876-1905" (PDF). Saskatchewan Archives. Archived from the original (PDF) on 28 September 2007.

== See also ==
- List of Northwest Territories territorial electoral districts
- Canadian provincial electoral districts
- Calgary Alberta provincial electoral district
- Calgary federal electoral district
