= Broadview (territorial electoral district) =

Former territorial electoral district in the North-West Territories, Canada

Broadview was a territorial electoral district for the Legislative Assembly of the North-West Territories, Canada. The riding was created by royal proclamation in 1883 and abolished in 1888 when the electoral districts were redistributed under the North-West Representation Act after it passed through the Parliament of Canada in 1888.

== Members of the Legislative Assembly (MLAs) ==
Name	Elected	Left Office
John Claude Hamilton	1883	1885
Charles Marshallsay	1885	1888

== Election results ==
=== 1883 election ===
North-West Territories territorial by-election, August 31, 1883
Party	Candidate	Votes	%
Independent	John Claude Hamilton	91	55.82%
Independent	John Leckie	72	44.18%
Total votes		163	
Source(s) "North-West Territories: Council and Legislative Assembly, 1876-1905" (PDF). Saskatchewan Archives. Archived from the original (PDF) on 28 September 2007.

=== 1885 election ===
1885 North-West Territories general election
Party	Candidate	Votes	%
Independent	Charles Marshallsay	187	53.28%
Independent	James Reilly	164	46.72%
Total votes		351	
Source(s) "North-West Territories: Council and Legislative Assembly, 1876-1905" (PDF). Saskatchewan Archives. Archived from the original (PDF) on 28 September 2007.

== See also ==
- List of Northwest Territories territorial electoral districts
- Canadian provincial electoral districts
