= Thomas Wesley Jackson =

Canadian politician

Member of the Council of the North-West Territories for Qu'Appelle
- In office 13 August 1884 – September 1886
- Succeeded by: William Dell Perley

Personal details
- Born: 6 June 1859 Downsview, Canada West
- Died: 26 February 1934 (aged 74) Vancouver, British Columbia
- Party: Independent
- Occupation: lawyer, farmer

Thomas Wesley Jackson (6 June 1859 – 26 February 1934) was a Canadian politician. He served on the 1st Council of the North-West Territories for Qu'Appelle from 1884 to 1886.

Jackson was born in Downsview, Canada West, of Irish ancestry. He worked as a lawyer for a time in Chatham, Ontario, before moving to the Qu'Appelle Valley in 1880. At Qu'Appelle he would farm and get involved with the railway, eventually raising to the position of President of the Qu'Appelle and Wood Mountain Railway. He was also a justice of the peace.

He was elected in 1883 to the Council of the North-West Territories, and resigned his seat in September 1886, owing to his activities as president of the railway. He later resided at Indian Head, Saskatchewan. He died at Vancouver, British Columbia in 1934.

== Electoral results ==
=== 1884 election ===
13 August 1883 by-election
| Name | Vote | % |
| Thomas Wesley Jackson | 344 | 75.44% |
| William Robert Bell | 112 | 24.56% |
| Total Votes | 456 | 100% |

=== 1885 election ===
1885 North-West Territories election
| Name | Vote | % | Elected |
| Thomas Wesley Jackson | 440 | 34.22% | X |
| William Dell Perley | 301 | 23.41% | X |
| Angus McKay | 290 | 22.55% | |
| Leslie Gordon | 137 | 10.65% | |
| Charles Edmund Phipps | 118 | 9.17% | |
| Total Votes | 1,286 | 100% | |
