= Samuel Cunningham (Canadian politician) =

Canadian politician

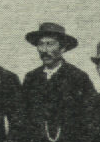

MLA for St. Albert
- In office 1885–1888
- Succeeded by: Antonio Prince

Personal details
- Born: April 8, 1848 Lac Ste. Anne, District of Alberta
- Died: January 14, 1919 (aged 70) Grouard, Alberta
- Spouse: Suzanne Grey

Samuel Cunningham (April 8, 1848 – January 14, 1919) was a politician from Northwest Territories, Canada. Although of mixed blood (Metis), he fought in the 1885 resistance on the government side, later serving on the NWT Council.

Cunningham was the son of John Cunningham, and Rosalie L' Hirondelle. His grandfather Patrick Cunningham was from Soligo Ireland who came to work for the Hudson's Bay Company, and his grandmother was Nancy Anne Bruce from Luisianna (daughter of Benjamin Bruce from the Orkney Islands of Scotland and Matilda who was Mohawk) Sam Cunningham was born at Lac Ste. Anne, Alberta District. He was married to Susan Gray. He was a pioneer in the St. Albert area, He opened St. Albert Trail. He helped suppress the Riel Rebellion of 1885 as a member of the St. Albert Mounted Riflemen.

He was elected to the Northwest Territories Legislative Assembly for the electoral district of St. Albert by acclamation in the 1885 Northwest Territories election. His district was merged into the Edmonton electoral district for the first general election held on June 30, 1888. In that election he was defeated finishing third out of four candidates behind Frank Oliver and Herbert Charles Wilson.

Samuel Cunningham was experienced in acting as an advisor and intermediary between Aboriginal and European People and was fluent in English, French, and Cree. He was one of the interpreters during the negotiations of Treaty No. 8 in Grouard in 1899. He was also literate in English and well acquainted with Canadian law, politics, and business practices. Benoit v. Canada, 2002 FCT 243 (CanLII) at paras. 99–103.

He died in 1919 in Grouard, Alberta.

Legislative Assembly of the Northwest Territories
Preceded by New District	MLA St. Albert; 1885–1888	Succeeded by Antonio Prince
