= Hugh Richardson (magistrate) =

Canadian lawyer and judge (1826–1913)

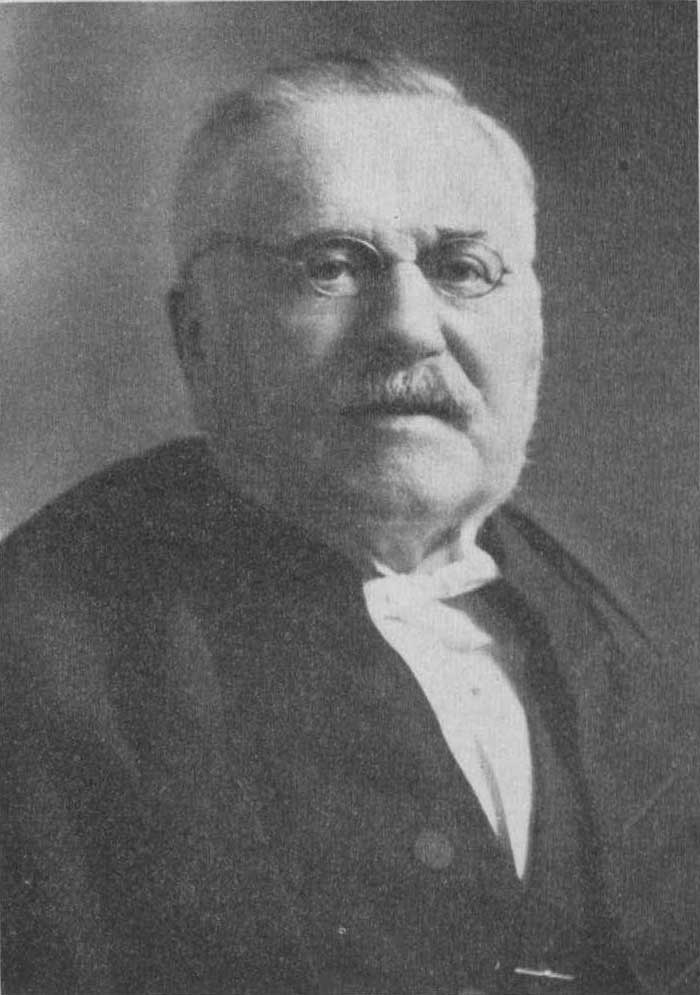
Lieutenant-Colonel Hugh Richardson

Hugh Richardson (21 July 1826 – 15 July 1913) was a stipendiary magistrate for the Assiniboia district of the North-West Territories of Canada. Richardson was the man who, at the conclusion of the 1885 trial of Louis Riel, sentenced Riel to hang, and who at the 1885 trial of Big Bear sentenced Big Bear to three years in prison.

Richardson was born in London, England in 1826 and came to York (later Toronto) with his family in 1831. He studied at Osgoode Hall Law School, was called to the bar in 1847 and set up practice in Woodstock. He was crown attorney for Oxford County from 1856 to 1862. He helped organize the local militia battalion, later becoming commander, and served at La Prairie, Canada East in 1865 with Colonel Garnet Joseph Wolseley and at Sarnia during the Fenian raids. After he was named a stipendiary magistrate in 1876, he moved to Battleford, North-West Territories; in 1883, he moved to Regina after the seat of government for the territories was moved there. He was in 1887 appointed senior judge of the Supreme Court of the Northwest Territories. Richardson served as acting lieutenant governor for the territories in 1897 and in 1898. He retired in 1903 and returned to Ottawa; his daughter Mary, who had married Donald Alexander Macdonald, was living there.

He died in Ottawa in 1913 and is interred in the cemetery of the St. Thomas Anglican ("Old English") Church, in St. Thomas, Ontario.

Legislative Assembly of the Northwest Territories
Preceded by Matthew Ryan	Presiding Officer of the Northwest Territories Assembly; 1882-1888	Succeeded by Herbert Charles Wilson
