= Moose Jaw (territorial electoral district) =

Former territorial electoral district in the North-West Territories, Canada

Moose Jaw was a territorial electoral district for the Legislative Assembly of the North-West Territories, Canada. The riding was created by royal proclamation in 1883 and abolished in 1905 when Alberta and Saskatchewan were created.

== Members of the Legislative Assembly (MLAs) ==
Name	Elected	Left office
James Hamilton Ross	1883	1901
George Annable	1901	1905

== Election results ==
=== 1883 ===
August 13, 1883 by-election
Name	Vote	%
James Hamilton Ross	42	67.74%
John McKay	20	32.26%
Total votes	62	100%

=== 1885 ===
1885 North-West Territories election
Name	Vote	%
James Hamilton Ross	161	60.99%
Edward W. Hopkins	103	39.01%
Total votes	264	100%

=== 1888 ===
1888 North-West Territories general election
Name	Vote	%
James Hamilton Ross	161	55.72%
George Annable	129	44.28%
Total votes	290	100%

=== 1891 ===
1891 North-West Territories general election
Name	Vote	%
James Hamilton Ross	232	55.11%
John Gilbert Gordon	189	44.89%
Total votes	421	100%

=== 1894 ===
1894 North-West Territories general election
Name	Vote	%
James Hamilton Ross	413	55.59%
George Annable	330	44.41%
Total votes	743	100%

=== 1897 ===
October 26, 1897 by-election
Name	Vote	%
James Hamilton Ross	Acclaimed	

The by-election was held to confirm Mr. Ross to his appointment as the Territorial Secretary, the Territorial Treasurer and Minister of Public Works and Minister of Agriculture in the North-West Territories cabinet.

=== 1898 ===
1898 North-West Territories general election
Name	Vote	%
James Hamilton Ross	Acclaimed	

=== 1901 ===
March 22, 1901 by-election
Name	Vote	%
George Annable	498	50.15%
Arthur Hitchcock	495	49.85%
Total votes	993	100%

=== 1902 ===
1902 North-West Territories general election
Name	Vote	%
George Annable	579	55.14%
William Riddell	471	44.86%
Total votes	1,050	100%

== See also ==
- List of Northwest Territories territorial electoral districts
- Canadian provincial electoral districts
