= John D. Lauder =

Canadian politician

Dr. John D. Lauder

MLA for Calgary
- In office 1886–1888
- Preceded by: James Davidson Geddes
- Succeeded by: John Lineham

Personal details
- Born: January 27, 1854 Trim, Ireland
- Died: July 4, 1934 (aged 80) Innisfail, Alberta, Canada
- Party: Independent
- Spouse: Marguerite Thomson
- Occupation: Doctor, Rancher, Police Officer, Civil Servant

John Drought Lauder (January 27, 1854 – July 4, 1934) was a Canadian territorial level politician, rancher, police officer, civil servant, and medical doctor. As a police officer for the North-West Mounted Police he saw active service during the North-West Rebellion. He served as a member of the Legislative Assembly of the North-West Territories from 1885 until 1888.

== Early life ==
John Drought Lauder was born in Trim, Ireland, in 1855. He went to post secondary education at Trinity College, Dublin and learned medicine. He moved to North America, arriving in Fort Macleod, North-West Territories in 1876. Shortly after arriving he joined the North-West Mounted Police. As a police officer Lauder saw active combat duties during the North-West Rebellion. He was part of the Alberta Field Force led by Major General Thomas Bland Strange and served at the Battle of Frenchman's Butte.

Lauder was a pioneer cattle rancher. He settled in the Innisfail, area in the central portion of the District of Alberta. He registered the second cattle brand with the North-West Territories government. He married his wife Marguerite Thomson, a French-Canadian woman from Quebec, in Calgary in 1885. They would have five children together.

As a civil servant Lauder worked as an Indian agent on the Blackfoot Reserve.

== Political career ==
Lauder was elected to the North-West Territories Legislature in his first attempt as a candidate. He won first of two places in the Calgary electoral district in the July 14, 1886 by-election. Lauder won almost 34% of the votes cast (each voter could cast two votes). He had 37 more votes than Hugh Cayley who won the other seat. He served in the legislature until it was dissolved in 1888, choosing not to run again.

Lauder ran again for a NWT Assembly seat 14 years later in the 1902 North-West Territories general election. He ran in the Innisfail electoral district. He was defeated by John Simpson, losing by 21 votes .

== Late life ==
Lauder lived out his entire life in the Innisfail area of Alberta. He died in 1934.

Legislative Assembly of the Northwest Territories
Preceded by James Davidson Geddes	MLA Calgary; 1886-1888	Succeeded by John Lineham
