= Regina (territorial electoral district) =

Former territorial electoral district in the North-West Territories, Canada

Regina was a territorial electoral district for the Legislative Assembly of the North-West Territories, Canada.

The riding was created by royal proclamation in 1883 and abolished in 1888. The North-West Representation Act 1888 split the riding into South Regina and North Regina.

== Members of the Legislative Assembly (MLAs) ==
Name	Elected	Left office
William White	1883	1885
David Jelly	1885	1888
John Secord	1885	1888

== Election results ==
=== 1883 ===
August 13, 1883 by-election
Name	Vote	%
William White	89	59.33%
Joseph O. Boucher	31	20.67%
Edward Carss	30	20.00%
Total votes	150	100%

=== 1885 ===
1885 North-West Territories election
Name	Vote	%	Elected
David Jelly	315	42.68%	X
John Secord	261	35.37%	X
Henry Fisher	162	21.95%	
Total votes	738	100%	

== See also ==
- List of Northwest Territories territorial electoral districts
- Canadian provincial electoral districts
