= Moose Mountain (territorial electoral district) =

Former territorial electoral district in the North-West Territories, Canada

Moose Mountain was a territorial electoral district for the Legislative Assembly of the North-West Territories, Canada. The riding was created by royal proclamation in 1884 and abolished in 1888. The riding was abolished during redistribution after the North-West Representation Act passed through the Parliament of Canada.

== Members of the Legislative Assembly (MLAs) ==
Name	Elected	Left office
John Gillanders Turriff	1884	1888

== Election results ==
=== 1884 ===
June 28, 1884 by-election
Name	Vote	%
John Gillanders Turriff	98	64.90%
Frank Taylor	53	35.10%
Total votes	151	100%

=== 1886 ===
July 8, 1884 by-election
Name	Vote	%
John Gillanders Turriff	Acclaimed	

== See also ==
- List of Northwest Territories territorial electoral districts
- Canadian provincial electoral districts
