= Qu'Appelle (territorial electoral district) =

Former territorial electoral district in the North-West Territories, Canada

Qu'Appelle was a territorial electoral district for the Legislative Assembly of North-West Territories, Canada. The riding was created as a single member electoral district by royal proclamation in 1883. In 1885 the riding was mandated to return two members to the Assembly (elected by block voting). In 1888 the riding was split into North Qu'Appelle and South Qu'Appelle. The redistribution was caused by the North-West Representation Act 1880 passing through the Parliament of Canada.

== Members of the Legislative Assembly (MLAs) ==
Name	Elected	Left office
Thomas Wesley Jackson	1883	1886
William Dell Perley	1885	1887
Robert Crawford	1886	1888
William Sutherland	1887	1888

== Election results ==
=== 1883 ===
August 13, 1883 by-election
Name	Vote	%
Thomas Wesley Jackson	344	75.44%
William Robert Bell	112	24.56%
Total votes	456	100%

=== 1885 ===
in 1885, the district elected two members. Each voter could cast up to two votes.

1885 North-West Territories election
Name	Vote	%	Elected
Thomas Wesley Jackson	440	34.22%	X
William Dell Perley	301	23.41%	X
Angus McKay	290	22.55%	
Leslie Gordon	137	10.65%	
Charles Edmund Phipps	118	9.17%	
Total votes	1,286	100%	

=== 1886 ===
October 14, 1886 by-election
Name	Vote	%
Robert Crawford	332	53.38%
George Davidson	290	46.62%
Total votes	622	100%

=== 1887 ===
May 24, 1887 by-election
Name	Vote	%
William Sutherland	310	63.92%
Levi Thompson	137	28.25%
George L. Dobbs	38	7.83%
Total votes	485	100%

== See also ==
- List of Northwest Territories territorial electoral districts
- Canadian provincial electoral districts
