= Lawrence Clarke (politician) =

Canadian politician

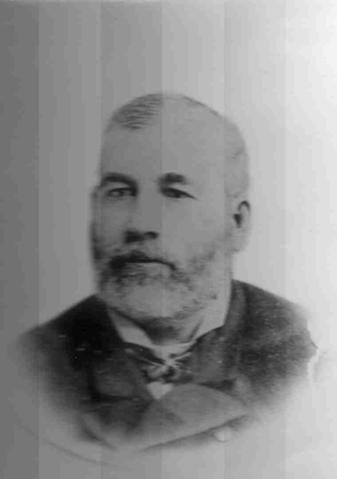
- Lawrence Clarke in 1882
- Born: June 26, 1832; Fermoy, Ireland
- Died: October 5, 1890 (aged 58); Prince Albert, Northwest Territories (now Saskatchewan)
- Occupations: Politician and HBC official

Lawrence Clarke (June 26, 1832 – October 5, 1890, Prince Albert, Northwest Territories) was the Chief Factor of the Saskatchewan District of the Hudson's Bay Company. He resided at Fort Carlton in Canada. He later became a magistrate. Clarke moved to what is today Prince Albert, Saskatchewan in the early 1880s and was a prominent local citizen with connections in the Conservative Party of Canada.

He is regarded by some as worsening the living conditions for the Métis.. He questioned Gabriel Dumont for fining a group of Métis who had begun to hunt bison before the official hunt of the St. Laurent community in the spring of 1875, but after investigation, the Crown carried no action against Dumont or the St. Laurent group. However, after this interaction the concern the government had over the St. Laurent settlement being seen as a 'provisional' government as with Riel in 1869–70, saw the St Laurent group become less organized in their political structure to prevent tensions with the crown. Some figures in the Métis community, notably James Isbister, also blamed him for inciting the Métis to violence in 1885 by spreading false rumours of an impending government attack. Thomas McKay, first mayor of Prince Albert was Clarke's brother-in-law.

He was the first elected Member of the Legislative Assembly in Northwest Territories' history.

Legislative Assembly of the Northwest Territories
New district	MLA Lorne; 1881–1883	Succeeded by Dan Howell
