= John Gillanders Turriff =

Canadian politician

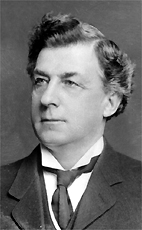
John Turriff

John Gillanders Turriff (14 December 1855 – 10 November 1930) was a Canadian politician, serving as a member of the North-West Council/Assembly, as a Liberal member of the House of Commons (1904-1917) and as a Unionist/Conservative member of the Canadian Senate.

Born in Petit-Métis, Canada East, Turriff as a young man established himself as a farmer in Western Canada, first in Manitoba. After moving to Carlyle (Saskatchewan), he became a successful merchant.

He served as the member for Moose Mountain in the Council of the North West Territories from 1884 to 1888, then as a member of the North-West Territories Assembly, 1888-1891.

A Liberal, he ran for a seat as a Member of Parliament in the Assiniboia East riding in 1891, but was defeated by Conservative candidate Edgar Dewdney. He ran again in the Canadian federal election of 1904 and secured the Assiniboia East seat. He was re-elected in 1908, 1911, and 1917.

In April 1917, he spoke in the House of Commons in favor of electoral reform, proportional representation, and single transferable voting.

During the last years of World War I, Turriff sat as a Liberal-Unionist MP and was a reluctant supporter of the Unionist coalition government led by Conservative Robert Laird Borden.

In recognition of his support and long service, Turriff was appointed on 23 September 1918 to the Senate of Canada on Borden's recommendation, and represented the senatorial division of Assiniboia, Manitoba as a Liberal until his death.

1904 Canadian federal election: Assiniboia East
Party	Candidate	Votes	%	±%
Liberal	John Gillanders Turriff	3,770	55.39	+3.75
Conservative	J.R. Brigham	3,036	44.61	–3.75
Total valid votes		6,806	100.00	
Total rejected ballots		unknown		
Turnout		6,806	73.95	–2.64
Eligible voters		9,204		
Liberal hold		Swing		+3.75
Source: Library of Parliament

Legislative Assembly of the Northwest Territories
Preceded by New District	MLA Moose Mountain; 1884-1888	Succeeded by District Abolished
Preceded by New District	MLA Souris; 1888-1891	Succeeded by George Knowling
Parliament of Canada
Preceded by James Moffat Douglas	Member of Parliament Assiniboia East; 1904-1907	Succeeded by District Abolished
