= John Secord =

Canadian politician

John Secord, QC (April 15, 1850 – December 9, 1898) was a lawyer and political figure in the Northwest Territories, Canada. He represented Regina in the 1st Council of the Northwest Territories from 1885 to 1888 and South Regina in the Legislative Assembly of the Northwest Territories from 1888 to 1891 as a Liberal-Conservative.

He was born in Niagara, Canada West, the son of Daniel Secord, and was educated in Brantford. In 1875, he married Ida May Christopher. Secord was called to the Ontario bar in 1877. In 1890, he was named Queen's Counsel. He served as town clerk for Tillsonburg, Ontario and Regina.
