= Hugh Cayley =

Canadian politician

Hugh S. Cayley
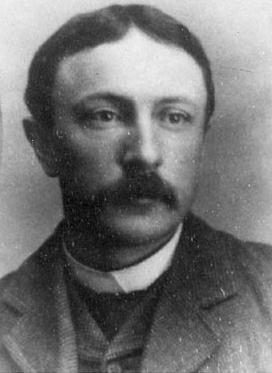

Chairman of the Executive Committee
- In office August 1, 1892 – October 31, 1892
- Monarch: Victoria
- Lieutenant Governor: Joseph Royal
- Preceded by: Frederick W. A. G. Haultain
- Succeeded by: Frederick W. A. G. Haultain

MLA for Calgary
- In office July 14, 1886 – October 31, 1894
- Preceded by: James Davidson Geddes
- Succeeded by: district abolished

Personal details
- Born: November 19, 1857 Toronto, Canada West
- Died: April 13, 1934 (aged 76) Vancouver, British Columbia
- Party: Independent
- Spouse: Leonora Adelaide Cochrane (m. 1897)
- Education: University of Toronto
- Occupation: lawyer, news reporter

Hugh St. Quentin Cayley (November 19, 1857 – April 13, 1934) was a Canadian lawyer, news reporter, and politician.

== Early life ==
Hugh St. Quentin Cayley was born on November 19, 1857, in Toronto. He was raised in Upper Canada and one of eleven children fathered by William Cayley. William Cayley was a lawyer and member of the Legislative Assembly of Canada.

Cayley studied law at the University of Toronto. After he graduated he worked for the law firm of Black, Kerr, Las and Cassels. Cayley later moved to New York City and became a news reporter.

Cayley married his wife Leonora Adelaide Cochrane on September 6, 1897.

They had one son, Beverley Cochrane Cayley, who was born October 25, 1898 and died from tuberculosis in June, 1928.

== News career ==
Cayley's first job as a news reporter was at the New York Herald-Tribune. He later moved west settling in Calgary, North-West Territories in 1884. He joined the staff at the Calgary Herald which was founded a year earlier. He quickly rose to be a partner in ownership of the Herald.

The biggest story of his career was the Travis Affair. In the fall of 1885 Stipendiary Magistrate Jeremiah Travis was sent by the federal government to enforce prohibition in Calgary. Travis took on the popular municipal council, and sentenced Alderman Simon J. Clarke to hard six months hard labour. Cayley, both clerk of the district court as well as editor of the Calgary Herald, wrote an unfavourable editorial on the magistrate. Travis accused Cayley of showing up at court drunk, dismissed him as clerk, charged him with contempt, and sentenced him to prison.

The height of Cayley's career at the Herald was serving as Publisher. He served that role from February 1885 to January 2, 1887.

He left the Herald selling off his interests in the newspaper when he ran for election in 1886.

== North-West Territories Legislature ==
Cayley was elected to the North-West Territories Legislature in a by-election held on July 14, 1886. The election was held to elect two members from the Calgary electoral district. Cayley won one of the two seats with 28.5% of the votes cast. John D. Lauder finished first in the four man field of candidates, winning 33.6% of the votes cast.

Cayley was re-elected to a second term in the first North-West Territories general election held in 1888. He won second place out of three with 34% of the vote. Cayley was acclaimed to his third term in the 1891 North-West Territories general election.

== Late life ==
After leaving politics, the mid-1890s saw Cayley resume his career as a lawyer, taking him to British Columbia where he practiced in Golden, Vernon, Grand Forks and Revelstoke, before arriving in Vancouver, British Columbia in 1905. In mid-1917 he was appointed as Judge of County Court, spending just over 15 years in that position, retiring in early 1933. The town of Cayley, Alberta is named in his honour. He died on April 13, 1934.

Legislative Assembly of the Northwest Territories
Preceded by James Davidson Geddes	MLA Calgary; 1886-1894	Succeeded by District Abolished
