= James Hamilton Ross =

Canadian politician (1856–1932)

James H. Ross
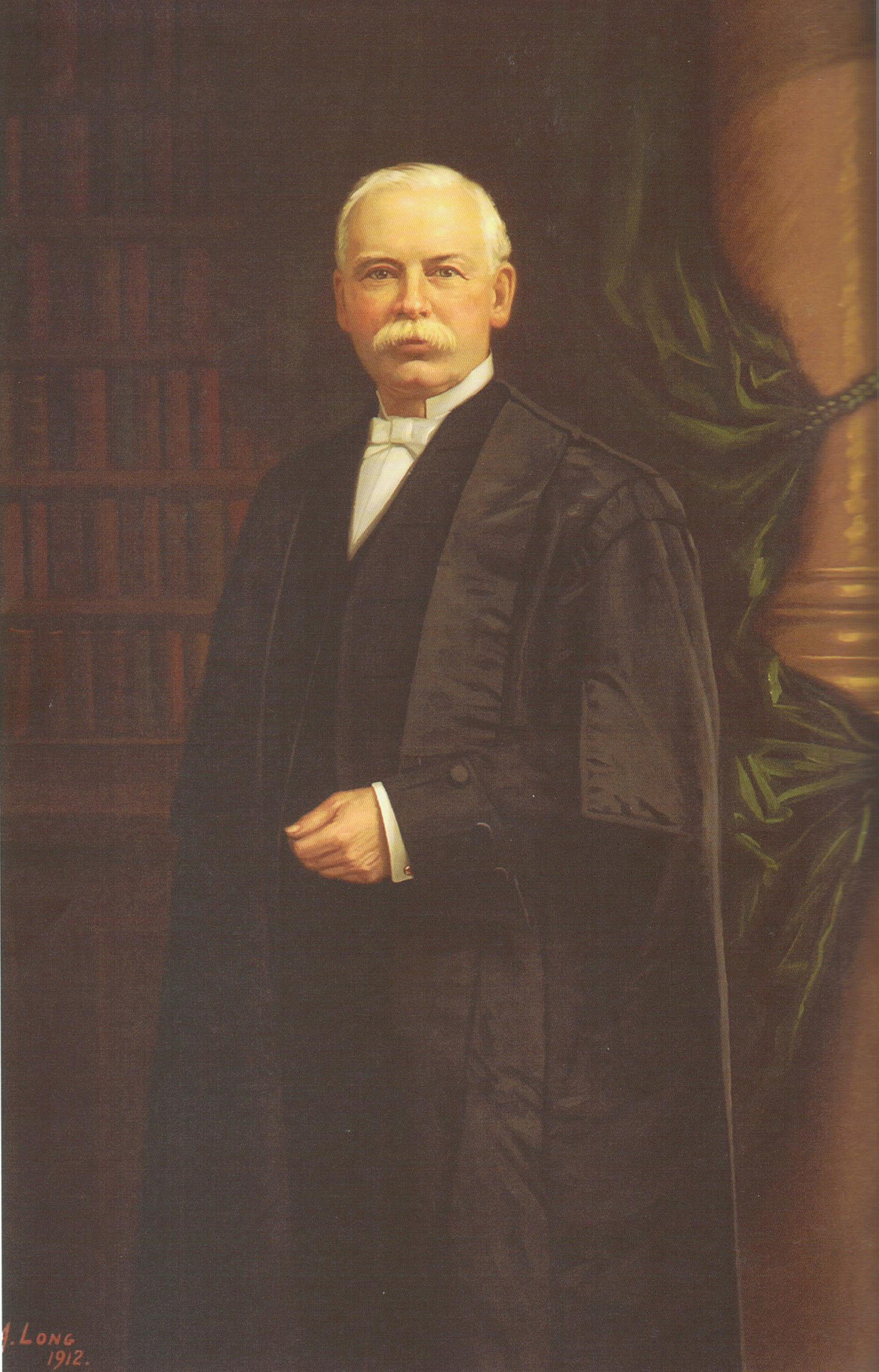

Speaker of the Legislative Assembly of the North-West Territories
- In office 1891–1894
- Preceded by: Herbert Charles Wilson
- Succeeded by: John Felton Betts

Commissioner of Yukon
- In office 1901–1902
- Preceded by: William Ogilvie
- Succeeded by: Frederick Tennyson Congdon

Personal details
- Born: May 12, 1856 London, Canada West
- Died: December 14, 1932 (aged 76) Victoria, British Columbia, Canada
- Party: Liberal Party of Canada
- Spouse: Barbara Elizabeth McKay (m. ca. 1885 - 1901, her death)
- Children: Mary Hathern Ross; Jane Graeme Ross; John Gordon Ross; Christina Graeme Ross; James Hamilton Ross; Barbara Elizabeth Ross; William McKay Ross

James Hamilton Ross (May 12, 1856 – December 14, 1932) was a Canadian politician, the third commissioner of Yukon, and an ardent defender of territorial rights. He is also considered to be the first resident of Moose Jaw, Saskatchewan.

== Early life ==
Ross was born in 1856 to John Edgar Ross and Christina Graeme (Hathern) Ross. On January 2, 1882, Ross, a western Canadian rancher born in London, Canada West, and four other men were scouting the location for the Canadian Pacific Railway divisional point when they became the first residents of the modern-day town of Moose Jaw, Saskatchewan.

4.5 days later, Ross established a homestead on the site, becoming the town's first permanent resident.

== Territorial political career ==
Soon after, Ross became an active participant in territorial government. He continuously campaigned for responsible government and was active in the negotiations to create the provinces of Alberta and Saskatchewan.

Ross sat in the Legislative Assembly of the Northwest Territories between 1883 and 1901, and was Speaker from 1891 to 1894 and a member of the Executive Council between 1895 and 1897. Ross also served as treasurer and then became the Commissioner of the Yukon Territory on March 11, 1901, becoming the first Yukon Commissioner to reside in Government House in Dawson City.

== Personal life and family ==
On August 15, 1901, his wife and youngest son, William, were lost in the sinking of the SS Islander near Juneau.

Another of his daughters, Jane Ross, married Alistair Fraser, the son of Lieutenant-Governor of Nova Scotia Duncan Cameron Fraser, who later went on to become Lieutenant-Governor in his own right.

His son, James Hamilton Ross, a chemist at McGill University, developed and patented a new method of synthesizing RDX used by the Allies in the Second World War. He was awarded the Medal of Freedom as well as Member of the Order of the British Empire.

Ross's granddaughter, Elizabeth Furse, grew up in apartheid-era South Africa. An Indigenous rights advocate, she naturalized in 1972 and went on to represent Oregon in the US House of Representatives for three terms.

== Federal political career ==
Ross ran for a seat to the House of Commons of Canada in a by-election held on December 2, 1902. He became the Yukon's first Member of Parliament defeating Yukon territorial councilor Joseph Clarke. He did not visit the Yukon Territory during the campaign and incurred no election expenses other than his deposit.

Ross was appointed to the Senate in 1904. Between 1904 and 1905, Ross represented Regina, Northwest Territories and after 1905 until his death, he continued to represent Regina after the creation of the province of Saskatchewan. From 1902 until his death, Ross was a member of the Liberal Party caucus.

James Hamilton Ross died in 1932 in Victoria, British Columbia.

1887 Canadian federal election: Assiniboia West
Party	Candidate	Votes	%
Conservative	Nicholas Flood Davin	726	63.19
Liberal	James Hamilton Ross	423	36.81
Total valid votes		1,149	100.00
Total rejected ballots		unknown	
Turnout		1,149	60.95
Eligible voters		1,885	
Source: Library of Parliament

Legislative Assembly of the Northwest Territories
New constituency	Member of the Legislative Assembly of the Northwest Territories for Moose Jaw; 1883–1901	Succeeded by George Annable
Preceded by Herbert Charles Wilson	Speaker of the Legislative Assembly of the Northwest Territories; 1891–1894	Succeeded by John Betts
Parliament of Canada
New constituency	Member of Parliament for Yukon; 1902–1904	Succeeded by Alfred Thompson
Government offices
Preceded by William Ogilvie	Commissioner of Yukon; 1901–1902	Succeeded by Frederick Tennyson Congdon
