= William Sutherland (Northwest Territories politician) =

Canadian politician

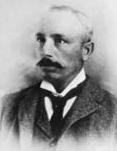
- William Sutherland, 1896

MLA for Qu'Appelle and North Qu'Appelle
- In office 1887–1898
- Succeeded by: Donald H. McDonald

Personal details
- Born: September 3, 1854 Ottawa, Canada West
- Died: June 30, 1930 (aged 75) Bridgeburg, Ontario
- Spouse(s): Henrietta Aquas Traveller married 1888

William Sutherland (September 3, 1854 – June 13, 1930) was a general merchant and political figure in the Northwest Territories, Canada. He represented Qu'Appelle in the 1st Council of the Northwest Territories from 1887 to 1888 and North Qu'Appelle in the Legislative Assembly of the Northwest Territories from 1888 to 1898 as a Conservative.

He was born in Ottawa, the son of a Scottish immigrant, and was educated in Ottawa. In 1888, he married Henrietta Aquas Traveller. He went to the Northwest Territories in 1881. Sutherland also served as postmaster for Qu'Appelle. Sutherland died of heart failure at Bridgeburg, Ontario in 1930 and was buried at Beechwood Cemetery in Ottawa.
