= 3rd North-West Legislative Assembly =

3rd North-West Assembly

Type
- Type: Unicameral

History
- Established: 1894
- Disbanded: 1898
- Preceded by: 2nd North-West Legislative Assembly
- Succeeded by: 4th North-West Legislative Assembly
- Seats: 29

Elections
- Last election: 1894

Meeting place
- Regina

The 3rd North-West Legislative Assembly was constituted after the 1894 North-West Territories general election which took place on October 31, 1984. It lasted from 1894 to 1898. Several important developments happened during this Assembly. The Northwest Territories was granted a Premier and a full Executive Council in 1897, and the Yukon was carved from the territory in 1898 due to the territorial government trying to collect taxes from settlers heading to the Klondike Gold Rush.

== List of Members of the Legislative Assembly ==
3rd North-West Legislative Assembly
District	Member	First elected	No. of terms
Banff	Robert Brett	1888	3rd term
Batoche	Charles Eugene Boucher	1892	2nd term
Battleford	James Clinkskill	1888	3rd term
Cannington	Samuel Page	1891	2nd term
East Calgary	Joseph Bannerman	1894	1st term
Edmonton	Frank Oliver	1888	3rd term
Edmonton	Matthew McCauley (1896)	1896	1st term
High River	John Lineham	1888	3rd term
Kinistino	William Frederick Meyers	1891	2nd term
Lethbridge	Charles Alexander Magrath	1891	2nd term
Macleod	Frederick Haultain	1887	4th term
Medicine Hat	Edward Fearon	1894	1st term
Mitchell	Hilliard Mitchell	1888	3rd term
Moose Jaw	James Hamilton Ross	1883	5th term
Moosomin	John Ryerson Neff	1888	3rd term
North Qu'Appelle	William Sutherland	1887	4th term
North Qu'Appelle	Donald H. McDonald (1896)	1896	1st term
North Regina	George W. Brown	1894	1st term
Prince Albert East	John Betts	1888	3rd term
Prince Albert West	John Reid	1894	1st term
Prince Albert West	T.J. Agnew (1897)	1897	1st term
Red Deer	John A. Simpson	1894	1st term
Saltcoats	William Eakin	1894	1st term
Souris	George Knowling	1891	2nd term
South Qu'Appelle	George Bulyea	1894	1st term
South Regina	Daniel Mowat	1891	2nd term
St. Albert	Daniel Maloney	1894	1st term
Victoria	Frank Fraser Tims	1894	1st term
West Calgary	Oswald Critchley	1894	1st term
Whitewood	Archibald Gillis	1894	1st term
Wolseley	James Dill	1891	2nd term
Yorkton	Frederick Insinger	1892	2nd term
Yorkton	Thomas Alfred Patrick (1897)	1897	1st term
