= 2nd North-West Legislative Assembly =

19th-century Canadian territorial assembly

2nd North-West Assembly

Type
- Type: Unicameral

History
- Established: 1891
- Disbanded: 1894
- Preceded by: 1st North-West Legislative Assembly
- Succeeded by: 3rd North-West Legislative Assembly
- Seats: 26

Elections
- Last election: 1891

Meeting place
- Regina

The 2nd North-West Legislative Assembly was constituted after the 1891 North-West Territories general election which took place on 7 November 1891. The Legislative Assembly lasted from 1891 to 1894.

== List of Members of the Legislative Assembly ==
2nd North-West Legislative Assembly
District of Alberta
District	Member	First elected	No. of terms
Banff	Robert Brett	1888	2nd term
Calgary	John Lineham	1888	2nd term
Calgary	Hugh Cayley	1886	3rd term
Edmonton	Frank Oliver	1888	2nd term
Lethbridge	Charles Alexander Magrath	1891	1st term
Macleod	Frederick Haultain	1887	3rd term
Medicine Hat	Thomas Tweed	1888	2nd term
Red Deer	Francis Wilkins	1891	1st term
St. Albert	Antonio Prince	1891	1st term
District of Assiniboia
District	Member	First elected	No. of terms
Cannington	Samuel Page	1891	1st term
Moose Jaw	James Hamilton Ross	1883	4th term
Moosomin	John Ryerson Neff	1888	2nd term
North Qu'Appelle	William Sutherland	1887	3rd term
Prince Albert	Thomas McKay	1891	1st term
Souris	George Knowling	1891	1st term
South Qu'Appelle	George Davidson	1888	2nd term
Wallace	Joel Reaman	1888	2nd term
Wallace	Fredrik Robert Insinger (1892)	1892	1st term
Whitewood	Daniel Campbell	1891	1st term
Whitewood	Joseph Clementson (1894)	1894	1st term
Wolseley	James Dill	1891	1st term
District of Saskatchewan
District	Member	First elected	No. of terms
Batoche	Charles Nolin (Note: In 1892 Charles Eugene Boucher was appointed by judicial order, and Charles Nolin was forced to step down.)	1891	1st term
Batoche	Charles Eugene Boucher (1892)	1892	1st term
Battleford	James Clinkskill	1888	2nd term
Cumberland	John Betts	1888	2nd term
Kinistino	William Frederick Meyers	1891	1st term
Mitchell	Hilliard Mitchell	1888	2nd term
North Regina	David Jelly	1885	3rd term
South Regina	Daniel Mowat	1891	1st term
