= 1st North-West Legislative Assembly =

1st Legislature
- Consensus parliament
- c. 1888 – c. 1891

Parliament leaders
- First minister: Robert Brett; 30 June 1888 – 7 November 1891

Lower House
- Speaker of the Lower House: Herbert Charles Wilson; 31 October 1888 – 10 October 1891
- Members: 25 seats

Sovereign
- Monarch: Victoria; 20 June 1837 – 22 January 1901
- Joseph Royal; 4 July 1888 – 31 October 1893

Sessions
- 1st session 31 October 1888 – 11 December 1888
- 2nd session 16 October 1889 – 22 November 1889
- 3rd session 29 October 1890 – 29 November 1890
← 1st Council of the North-West Territories	→ 2nd North-West Legislative Assembly

The 1st North-West Legislative Assembly lasted from 1888 to 1891. This Assembly was the third in the history of the North-West Territories. It marked a huge milestone, bringing responsible government to the territory for the first time.

== Background ==
The 1st North-West Territories Council was dissolved after reaching the quota of elected members prescribed under the North-West Territories Act. This precipitated the 1888 North-West Territories general election.

Despite being an elected body, there were three remaining appointed members left to serve in the Assembly. The three appointees were legal advisers; they could actively participate in debates and move motions, but did not have a vote.

== 1st Session ==
The 1st Session of the 1st North-West Legislative Assembly began on 31 October 1888. The festivities began in the morning, with music provided by the North-West Mounted Police Band. The session began at 3:00pm with Lieutenant Governor Joseph Royal entering the chamber escorted by Mounties.

The Council opened by electing the first speaker in North-West Territories history. Herbert Charles Wilson was nominated in a motion moved by Hugh Cayley. Wilson was acclaimed with the unanimous consent of the Assembly. The election for speaker was decided in a caucus meeting prior to the opening of the Assembly. There were two candidates for speaker presented. The first vote resulted in an 11 to 11 tie between James Ross and Wilson. Ross asked that his name be withdrawn but his supporters refused. After two more tie votes, Ross withdrew and Wilson was acclaimed as the choice for speaker.

Lieutenant Governor Advisory Council
Frederick Haultain
David Jelly
Hilliard Mitchell
William Sutherland

The throne speech outlined five main areas of concern. The first was the need for provisions to deal with and prevent prairie fires. The Lieutenant Governor then called for the repeal of the liquor laws passed by the Temporary North-West Council. The speech also announced the introduction of a bill to provide provisions for collecting vital statistics. Royal also reported on the efforts of his legal committee to consolidate the legislation of the North-West Territories. The last major portion of the speech outlined the upcoming budgetary estimates to be provided to members from the Lieutenant Governor advisory Council.

== Members ==
District of Alberta
District	Member	First elected	No. of terms
Calgary	John Lineham	1888	1st term
Calgary	Hugh Cayley	1886	2nd term
Edmonton	Herbert Charles Wilson	1885	2nd term
Edmonton	Frank Oliver	1888	1st term
Macleod	Frederick Haultain	1887	2nd term
Medicine Hat	Thomas Tweed	1888	1st term
Red Deer	Robert Brett	1888	1st term
District of Assiniboia
District	Member	First elected	No. of terms
Moose Jaw	James Hamilton Ross	1883	3rd term
Moosomin	John Ryerson Neff	1888	1st term
North Qu'Appelle	William Sutherland	1887	2nd term
Prince Albert	William Plaxton	1888	1st term
Prince Albert	John Felton Betts	1888	1st term
Souris	John Gillanders Turriff	1884	3rd term
South Qu'Appelle	George Davidson	1888	1st term
Wallace	Joel Reaman	1888	1st term
Whitewood	Alexander Thorburn	1888	1st term
Wolseley	Benjamin Parkyn Richardson	1888	1st term
District of Saskatchewan
District	Member	First elected	No. of terms
Batoche	Hilliard Mitchell	1888	1st term
Battleford	James Clinkskill	1888	1st term
Kinistino	James Hoey	1888	1st term
North Regina	David Jelly	1885	2nd term
South Regina	John Secord	1885	2nd term
Appointed legal advisors
James Macleod
Hugh Richardson
Charles Rouleau
