= 1894 North-West Territories general election =

- 31 October 1894

29 seats in the North-West Legislative Assembly
Chairman before election
Frederick Haultain
Chairman after election
Frederick Haultain

The 1894 North-West Territories general election was held on 31 October 1894. This was the third general election in the history of the North-West Territories, Canada. It was held to elect 29 members of the Legislative Assembly of the North-West Territories, the writs were dropped on 3 October 1894. Frederick Haultain continued to lead the government.

This was the first general election a secret ballot was held, with voters marking an X on a blank piece of paper in the colour that corresponds to their candidate.

== Election results ==
The turnout cannot be established, as no voters lists were in use.

Members were elected on non-partisan basis but decisions were decided by majority vote in the chamber.

Election summary	# of candidates		Popular vote	
Election summary	Incumbent	New	#	%
Acclaimed candidates	4	2	-	-
Elected candidates	15	8	6,856	44.73%
Defeated candidates	5	24	5,672	45.27%
Total	53		12,528	100%

== Results by riding ==
Members elected to the 3rd North-West Legislative Assembly. For complete electoral history, see individual districts

Electoral District	First	Second	Third	Fourth	Fifth	Incumbent
Banff	Robert Brett; 238; 64.15%	T.F. English; 133; 35.85%				Robert Brett
Batoche	Charles Eugene Boucher; 101; 57.06%	David Venne; 76; 42.94%				Charles Eugene Boucher
Battleford	James Clinkskill; 173; 52.74%	Benjamin Prince; 155; 47.26%				James Clinkskill
Cannington	Samuel Page; 237; 60.00%	N. McConnachie; 158; 40.00%				Samuel Page
East Calgary	Joseph Bannerman; 209; 33.55%	Simon John Clarke; 190; 30.50%	Neville James Lindsay; 117; 18.78%	Paddy Nolan; 57; 9.15%	James Reilly; 50; 8.03%	New District from Calgary
Edmonton	Frank Oliver; Acclamation					Frank Oliver
High River	John Lineham; 328; 76.81%	Frederick James Boswell; 99; 23.19%				New District from Calgary
Kinistino	William Frederick Meyers; 60; 51.28%	James Tennant; 57; 48.72%				William Frederick Meyers
Lethbridge	Charles Alexander Magrath; Acclamation					Charles Alexander Magrath
Macleod	Frederick W. A. G. Haultain; Acclamation					Frederick W. A. G. Haultain
Medicine Hat	Edward Fearon; 398; 56.29%	Thomas Tweed; 309; 43.71%				Thomas Tweed
Mitchell	Hilliard Mitchell; Acclamation					Hilliard Mitchell
Moose Jaw	James Hamilton Ross; 413; 55.59%	Jonathan Edward Annable; 330; 44.41%				James Hamilton Ross
Moosomin	John Ryerson Neff; 561; 57.78%	Neil G. McCallum; 410; 42.22%				John Ryerson Neff
North Qu’Appelle	William Sutherland; 312; 55.12%	George Forbes Guernsey; 183; 32.33%	William Richard Motherwell; 71; 12.54%			William Sutherland
North Regina	George W. Brown; 454; 64.03%	David Jelly; 255; 35.97%				David Jelly
Prince Albert East	John Felton Betts; 282; 57.32%	James Taylor; 210; 42.68%				New District
Prince Albert West	John Lestock Reid; 238; 56.40%	Alexander Campbell; 184; 43.60%				New District
Red Deer	John A. Simpson; 282; 37.55%	Leonard Gaetz; 257; 34.22%	Francis Wilkins; 212; 28.23%			Francis Wilkins
St. Albert	Daniel Maloney; 368; 53.10%	Antonio Prince; 325; 46.90%				Antonio Prince
Saltcoats	William Eakin; 280; 58.95%	Thomas Carleton; 195; 41.05%				New District
Souris	George Knowling; Acclamation					George Knowling
South Qu’Appelle	George H. V. Bulyea; 355; 51.90%	George Davidson; 329; 48.10%				George Davidson
South Regina	Daniel Mowat; 315; 56.25%	Jacob W. Smith; 245; 43.75%				Daniel Mowat
Victoria	Frank Fraser Tims; Acclamation					
West Calgary	Oswald Critchley; 236; 35.33%	Alexander Lucas; 228; 34.13%	Arthur Sifton; 204; 30.54%			New District from Calgary
Whitewood	Archibald Beaton Gillis; 300; 51.64%	Walter Claude Thorburn; 281; 48.36%				Daniel Campbell
Wolseley	James Dill; 511; 67.33%	T. Fleming; 248; 32.67%				James Dill
Yorkton	Fredrik Robert Insinger; 205; 66.34%	J.S. Crerar; 104; 33.66%				New District
