= 1891 North-West Territories general election =

- 7 November 1891

25 seats in the North-West Legislative Assembly
Chairman before election
Robert Brett
Chairman after election
Frederick Haultain

The 1891 North-West Territories general election was held on 7 November 1891 to elect 25 members of the Legislative Assembly of the North-West Territories, Canada. It was the second general election in the History of the North-West Territories. The legislature for the first time had no appointed members. It had 25 elected members, four more than in the 1888 election. The assembly had grown by one member—the three appointed "at large" legal advisors who had sat in the assembly previously were no longer there.

Frederick W. A. G. Haultain, the member for Macleod, was the government leader.

The key issue in this election was the French language question. Politicians had spent the previous three years divided on the issues of eliminating the status of the French language as an official language of the territory, and of assimilation of the French-speaking population. The appointed government made French an official language in Section 11 of the North-West Territories Act of 1877 that gained Royal Assent 28 April 1877. Prior to that, French was an official language while the North-West Territories was administered under the Manitoba Act from 1870 to 1875.

The issue was ignited by Lieutenant Governor Joseph Royal reading the Speech from the Throne in French on 31 October 1888. The outcry caused Royal to read his second throne speech in English only. On 28 October 1889, the issue was made dormant when a Record Division was taken on the "Language Resolution", a motion that stated the assembly did not need official recognition of languages. The vote was 17 for 2 against. But this did not last, because the federal government got involved, and warned the Lieutenant Governor Royal to start making speeches in French again, and tried to legislate official bilingualism back in the territory, through the House of Commons of Canada. The bill was defeated on second reading, however.

The interference by the Government of Canada resulted in members being elected to the assembly who favoured English as the only official language. On 19 January 1892 Haultain made a motion that only English would be used in the Assembly. The motion passed on division: 20 for, 4 against.

== Electoral system ==
Most of the members were elected in single-member districts through First past the post.

In Calgary two members were elected, through Block Voting (although in this instance they were elected by acclamation).

== Election results ==
The turnout can not be established as no voters lists were in use.

Members were elected on non-partisan basis but decisions were decided by majority vote in the chamber.

Election summary	# of candidates		Popular vote	
Election summary	Incumbent	New	#	%
Acclaimed candidates	7	4	-	-
Elected candidates	7	7	2,500	53.88%
Defeated candidates	5	12	2,140	46.12%
Total	42		4,640	100%

Note: No vote returns, are currently available from the Batoche, St. Albert and Souris districts

== Results by riding ==
Members elected to the 2nd North-West Legislative Assembly. For complete electoral history, see individual districts

Electoral District	First	Second	Third	Incumbent
Banff	Robert Brett; Acclamation			New District
Batoche (Note: In 1892 Charles Eugene Boucher was appointed by judicial order, and Charles Nolin was forced to step down.)	Charles Nolin	Charles Eugene Boucher		Hilliard Mitchell
Battleford	James Clinkskill; 168; 55.63%	James M. Skelton; 134; 44.37%		James Clinkskill
Calgary (Note: Two representatives were elected from the district.)	John Lineham; Acclamation Hugh Cayley; Acclamation			John Lineham Hugh Cayley
Cannington	Samuel Page; Acclamation			New District
Cumberland	John Felton Betts; 159; 51.96%	Philip Turnor; 106; 34.64%	William Plaxton; 41; 13.4%	New District
Edmonton	Frank Oliver; Acclamation			Herbert Charles Wilson Frank Oliver (formerly a two-seat district)
Kinistino	William Frederick Meyers; 32; 52.46%	George Ellis; 29; 47.54%		James Hoey
Lethbridge	Charles Alexander Magrath; Acclamation			New District
Macleod	Frederick W. A. G. Haultain; Acclamation			Frederick W. A. G. Haultain
Medicine Hat	Thomas Tweed; Acclamation			Thomas Tweed
Mitchell	Hilliard Mitchell; Acclamation			New District
Moose Jaw	James Hamilton Ross; 232; 55.11%	John Gilbert Gordon; 189; 44.89%		James Hamilton Ross
Moosomin	John Ryerson Neff; Acclamation			John Ryerson Neff
North Qu’Appelle	William Sutherland; 173; 50.73%	A. Stewart; 168; 49.27%		William Sutherland
North Regina	David Jelly; 229; 60.58%	W. Cayley Hamilton; 149; 39.42%		David Jelly
Prince Albert	Thomas McKay; Acclamation			William Plaxton
Red Deer	Francis Wilkins; Acclamation			Robert Brett
St. Albert	Antonio Prince; 210	Daniel Maloney; 183	L. Garneau not shown	New District
Souris	George Knowling; Elected	John Wesley Connell –		John Gillanders Turriff
South Qu’Appelle	George Davidson; 320; 63.24%	George H. V. Bulyea; 186; 36.76%		George Davidson
South Regina	Daniel Mowat; 185; 50.82%	John Secord; 179; 49.18%		John Secord
Wallace	Joel Reaman; 314; 51.06%	Thomas Alfred Patrick; 301; 48.94%		Joel Reaman
Whitewood	Daniel Campbell; 197; 45.92%	Alexander Thorburn; 178; 41.49%	John Hawkes; 54; 12.59%	Alexander Thorburn
Wolseley	James Dill; 312; 59.43%	Benjamin Parkyn Richardson; 213; 40.57%		Benjamin Parkyn Richardson
