= William Finlay =

Canadian politician

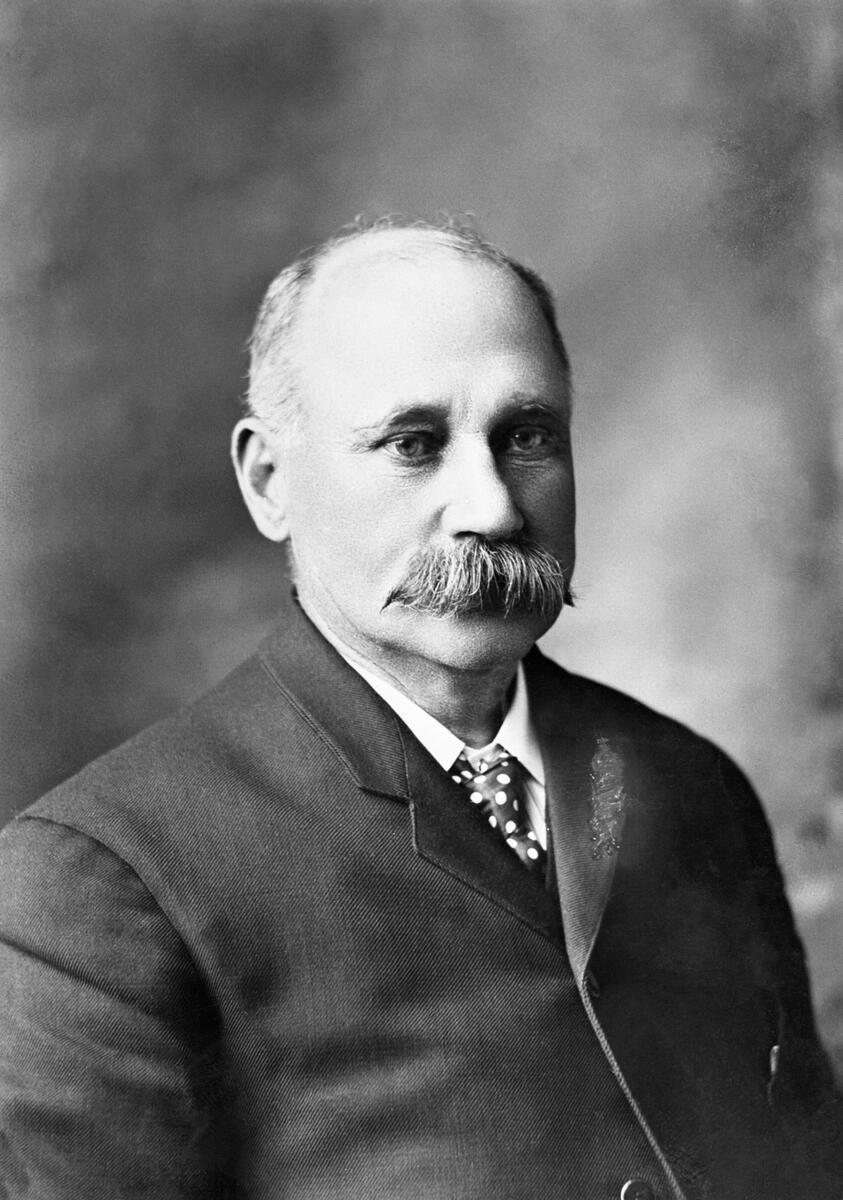

Member of the Legislative Assembly of Alberta
- In office November 9, 1905 – June 6, 1910
- Preceded by: New district
- Succeeded by: Charles R. Mitchell
- Constituency: Medicine Hat

Alberta Minister of Agriculture
- In office September 9, 1905 – November 1, 1909
- Preceded by: New position
- Succeeded by: Duncan Marshall

Alberta Provincial Secretary
- In office September 9, 1905 – November 1, 1909
- Preceded by: New position
- Succeeded by: Duncan Marshall

Member of the Legislative Assembly of the Northwest Territories
- In office May 21, 1902 – August 31, 1905
- Preceded by: Horace Greeley
- Succeeded by: District abolished
- Constituency: Medicine Hat

Mayor of Medicine Hat
- In office 1900–1903
- Preceded by: William Bradley Marshall
- Succeeded by: Archibald Courtice Hawthorne

Personal details
- Born: William Thomas Finlay; July 12, 1853 Lisburn, Ireland
- Died: May 9, 1914 (aged 60) Vancouver, British Columbia
- Party: Liberal
- Spouse: Catherine Anne Allott
- Children: Two sons, three daughters
- Occupation: Merchant, rancher

William Thomas Finlay (July 12, 1853 – May 9, 1914) was a merchant, politician and cabinet minister in Alberta and Northwest Territories, Canada. Finlay served as the second mayor of Medicine Hat, represented the electoral district of Medicine Hat in the Legislative Assembly of Alberta, and served in the Cabinet of Alexander Cameron Rutherford as Alberta's first Minister of Agriculture and Provincial Secretary from 1905 to 1909.

== Early life ==
Finlay was born in Lisburn, Ireland on July 12, 1853, to John Finlay and Christina Brownlee. He was educated at the Royal Belfast Academical Institution and worked in the wholesale grocery business before moving to Montreal, Quebec in 1873. Finlay continued to move around, living in Toronto and eventually in Winnipeg, working as a travelling salesman for the Northwest Lumber Company in 1883 and later his own firm Finlay and Company. Finlay set up branches of the Northwest lumber Company along the Canadian Pacific Railway line as it moved west across the prairies, and settled in Medicine Hat shortly afterwards. Finlay left his lumber agency in 1886 and joined Thomas Andrew Tweed and two other prominent men in the Medicine Hat Ranche Company.

Finlay was active in the Medicine Hat community, serving on the hospital board from 1896 to 1904, as a justice of the peace from 1886 to 1896, as president of the local board of trade in 1888, and as director of the agricultural society in 1889.

Finlay married Catherine Anne Allott in Winnipeg on February 10, 1883.

== Political life ==
William first ran for the Legislative Assembly of Northwest Territories in the 1898 Northwest Territories general election in the Medicine Hat district but was defeated, coming a close second to Horace Greeley.

Finlay was elected the second mayor of Medicine Hat in 1900 and was acclaimed to the position the following year. As mayor, Finlay oversaw the construction of a water system, a municipal building, and natural gas extraction.

With his experience as mayor of Medicine Hat, Finlay ran again in the 1902 Northwest Territories general election this time becoming elected as the Member of the Legislative Assembly for Medicine Hat. During the discussions for province-hood for the North-West Territories, Finlay was strongly opposed to the concept of publicly funded separate schools for Roman Catholics and Protestants, however, he eventually accepted the compromise solution for Alberta.

=== Alberta politics ===
In February 1905, the federal government of Prime Minister Sir Wilfrid Laurier introduced legislation to create two new provinces (Alberta and Saskatchewan) from the Northwest Territories. In August 1905, Laurier appointed George H. V. Bulyea the first Lieutenant Governor of Alberta, and on September 2, Bulyea asked Alexander Cameron Rutherford to form the first government of Alberta. On September 9 Finlay was appointed to Rutherford's Cabinet as Alberta's first Minister of Agriculture and Provincial Secretary. Finlay's inclusion in cabinet came after strong pressure on Rutherford from liberals in Medicine Hat to acknowledge the regions importance, as well as Finlay's virtues. Finlay was the only member of the Rutherford cabinet born outside of Canada.

In Alberta's first general election, Finlay was elected as a member of the Alberta Liberal Party for Medicine Hat defeating conservative candidate Francis O. Sissions by a narrow margin of 51.7 per cent to 48.3 per cent.

Under Finlay, the department of Agriculture undertook educational initiatives including experimental agricultural stations, travelling dairy and grain schools, and support for farmers institutes and agricultural fairs. Alberta also saw government creameries built, as well as government financing for factories for cheese, pork, and poultry. As a representative for Medicine Hat, Finlay brought forward several projects in the region. In March 1909, just before the upcoming election, Finlay announced the construction of the $40,000 Medicine Hat Courthouse, a bridge, and a demonstration farm in the region.

Finlay was re-elected in the 1909 Alberta general election defeating conservative Francis O. Sissons once again, with a larger margin of 71.7 per cent to 28.3 per cent. Finlay resigned from his cabinet posts shortly afterwards on November 1, 1909, due to his failing health. He stepped down as the member of his riding in 1910 after his health deteriorated to the point where he could no longer perform his duties, and made room for Charles R. Mitchell to run in a by-election.

== Death ==
Finlay moved to Vancouver, British Columbia after his retirement. He died in 1914.

== Electoral record ==
1909 Alberta general election results (Medicine Hat)		Turnout N.A.	
Liberal	William Thomas Finlay	1,249	71.66%
Conservative	F. O. Sissions	494	28.34%
1905 Alberta general election results (Medicine Hat)		Turnout N.A.	
Liberal	William Thomas Finlay	575	51.71%
Conservative	F. D. Sissons	537	48.29%
1902 Northwest Territories general election results (Medicine Hat)		Turnout N.A.	
	William Thomas Finlay	486	70.33%
	J. A. Grant	205	29.67%
1898 Northwest Territories general election results (Medicine Hat)		Turnout N.A.	
	Horace Greeley	327	36.50%
	William Thomas Finlay	285	31.81%
	John George Calder	284	31.70%
