= Benjamin Richardson =

Benjamin or Ben Richardson may refer to:

- Benjamin Ward Richardson (1828–1896), British physician and writer on medical history
- Benjamin Parkyn Richardson (1857–1910), member of the first North-West Legislative Assembly
- Benjamin Richardson (sprinter) (born 2003), South African track and field athlete
- Ben Richardson (born 1983), British cinematographer
- Ben Richardson (basketball) (born 1996), basketball player
- Ben Richardson, a Coronation Street character
- Ben Richardson, Canadian bassist of Grady
