= William Eddy =

William Eddy may refer to:

- William Eddy (politician) (1865–1926), Australian politician
- William A. Eddy (1896–1962), U.S. minister to Saudi Arabia
- William Abner Eddy (1850–1909), American accountant and journalist
- William C. Eddy (1902–1989), American inventor
- William F. Eddy (1852–?), Canadian businessman, Mayor of Regina

== See also ==
- William Ede (disambiguation)
