= James B. Hawkes =

Canadian politician

James Benjamin Hawkes
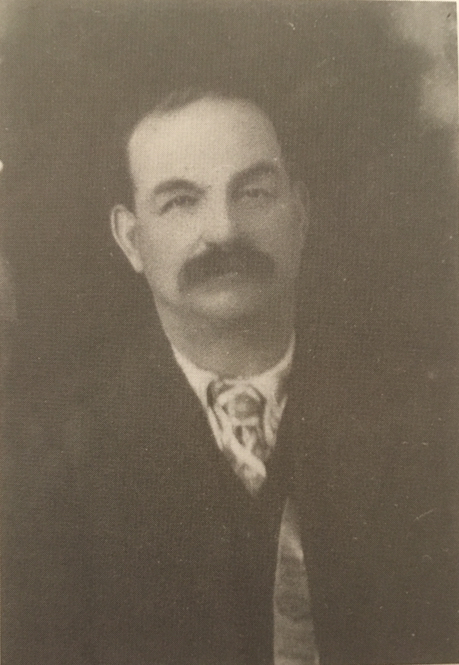

Member of the Legislative Assembly of the Northwest Territories
- In office 1898–1905
- Preceded by: Daniel Mowat
- Succeeded by: District abolished
- Constituency: South Regina

Personal details
- Born: January 9, 1857 Birmingham, Warwickshire, England
- Died: July 29, 1936 (aged 79) Peachland
- Party: Conservative Party of Canada
- Spouse: Marian Shaw
- Children: Nine
- Occupation: Farmer
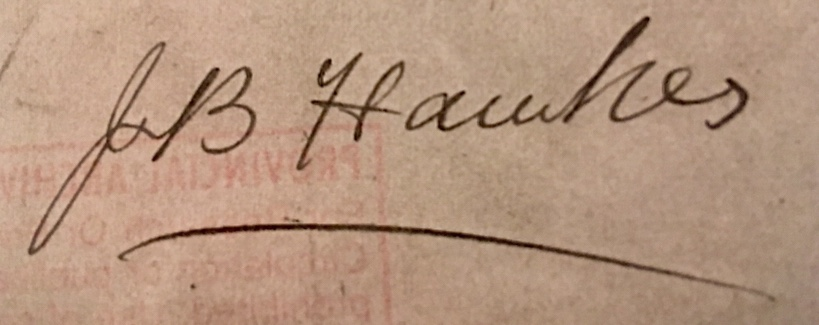
- Signature

James Benjamin Hawkes (9 January 1857 - 29 July 1936) was a Canadian pioneer and politician who served as an MLA in the Northwest Territories.

== Early life ==
James Hawkes came to Canada from England in 1880 to work on the Canadian Pacific Railway. Next, he constructed narrow gauge track to Lethbridge. He married Marian Shaw in 1885. The couple homesteaded near Balgonie and also ran the community's general store. He was said to reign over Balgonie "as a sort of rural king." Hawkes soon owned one of the largest wheat farms on the Prairies, and during the hard times following the crop failures of 1893 and 1894 rendered great assistance to his suffering subjects.

He served as Justice of the Peace for Balgonie and from 1891-1897 he served as the postmaster as well. It was subsequently alleged in the House of Commons of Canada that he had been terminated as postmaster by the newly elected Liberal government for partisan reasons. His removal was particularly unpopular with the Roman Catholic German settlers in the area, with whom he had a close relationship.

== Political career ==
He was active in organizing for the Conservative party in the Balgonie area from at least as early as 1887. In 1893 Nicholas Flood Davin presented a petition on behalf of Hawkes to the House of Commons requesting repeal of the clauses of the Northwest Territories Act mandating bilingualism in the courts and legislation of the territories and in 1894 the petition was again presented on behalf of Hawkes by the then independent MP Dalton McCarthy.

He contested the seat of South Regina in the Legislature in the 1898 Northwest Territories General Election. The incumbent, Daniel Mowat, had decamped to British Columbia, and in the months leading up to the election the newspaperman William Trant was perceived to be the front-runner, and although many other men were discussed as potential candidates, by June "the only one who is admittedly an opponent is Mr. J.B. Hawkes of Balgonie." Ultimately Trant withdrew from the race and Hawkes ran as an independent against J.W. Smith (Government) and the former mayor of Regina William F. Eddy (Independent).

An attempt was made during the campaign to use his pronounced Conservative loyalties against him, he responded by declaring that although he was opposed at present to the introduction of partisan politics in the Territorial Legislature, when they came everyone knew full well on which side he would be found.

When it became known that he had won the election "a tremendous demonstration took place in Regina.... a procession was formed, bonfires lighted and the successful candidate was carried around the town shoulder high. Beer flowed like water and everything went to show the great popularity of the "People's Jim.""

It was widely speculated that he would be the Conservative candidate for the Dominion House of Commons to replace his friend and sometime business partner Nicholas Flood Davin but in the event he chose not to run. He was comfortably retained in his seat in the 1902 Northwest Territories general election with a substantially increased majority. Hawkes ran as an "independent government" candidate, whereas his opponent, Smith, gave himself the label of "straight government."

In 1903 Hawkes introduced the charter bill requesting Regina's incorporation as a city. He stated that, "Regina has the brightest future before it of any place in the North West Territories." The bill passed with no opposition and Regina became a City 19 June 1903.

In 1904 he was on the committee founding St. Philip's Anglican Church in Balgonie.

Following the creation of the province of Saskatchewan, Hawkes stood as the Provincial Rights candidate for South Regina in the 1905 general election. Provincial Rights was the moniker adopted by Saskatchewan's Conservative Party from 1905-1912.

Following his narrow defeat in 1905 against the Minister of Education, J.A. Calder, Hawkes ran in 1908 for the Provincial Rights nomination in Regina County, the area that Premier Thomas Walter Scott represented. The nomination campaign against Frederick Clarke Tate proved particularly acrimonious, and after Hawkes suffered a close defeat many of his supporters said that it was unacceptable that a man who had given so much for the Tory cause should be deprived of the candidacy. Although Hawkes moved to make Tate's nomination unanimous it was only under pressure and he declared that he did not believe in "that kind of business." He further stated that he had no intention of supporting Tate in the forthcoming election.

The Liberals, sought to take advantage of this division by asking Hawkes to defect, and it was reported that should he run as a Liberal or even as an independent in that riding he would receive "a good thing" from the government. Hawkes rejected the Liberal offers and subsequently announced that he would support Tate, and it was believed that his large following within the German community would be decisive in the election. Recognizing that Hawkes could not be bought, members of the local Liberal association then offered the nomination to R.A. Carman, solely because he was known to be a friend of James Hawkes, but ultimately Carman did not run either. With the support of Hawkes the Provincial Rights candidate took the seat.

Hawkes would ultimately withdraw from public life due to a hearing problem but he remained an active supporter of the Conservative party to the end of his life.

== Later life and legacy ==
In 1911 Hawkes sold most of his farmland and moved to Regina, serving as President and Manager of Regent Financial Corporation Ltd. a real estate company with a portfolio including C.P.R. Farm Lands. During the First World War all three of his sons signed up with The 79th Cameron Highlanders of Canada serving in battles such as Vimy Ridge and Cambrai. All three were wounded, and one, Lieutenant Walter James Hawkes MM MC lost his life.

In 1917 James Hawkes was serving as a Homestead Inspector engaging in seed grain and relief collections for the Dominion government. Later he worked for the Soldier Settlement Board. In 1922 he sold the Regina home that was adjacent to that of Sir Frederick Haultain, then Chief Justice of Saskatchewan, but formerly the Premier of the Northwest Territories when James Hawkes had served in the Legislature, in order to move to Peachland, British Columbia. Mr. and Mrs. Hawkes brought with them their youngest daughter as well as James' mother in law, Ann Pilkington Shaw, who had already been residing with the family in Regina for a number of years.

They bought a fruit farm and he also worked as road foreman for the provincial government for several years. They were very active in the community, particularly in the Anglican Church, with Marian and her daughter playing a leading role in the Anglican Women's Auxiliary.

James Benjamin Hawkes died on 29 July 1936, and his wife Marian followed him within the year.

Hawkes Avenue and Bay in Regina, as well as Hawkes Avenue in Balgonie were named in honour of James. Additionally, Hawkes Street in Peachland was named after James and his wife.

== Electoral record ==
=== 1898 election ===
1898 Northwest Territories general election: South Regina
Name	Vote	%
James Hawkes	273	51.03%
J.W. Smith	210	39.25%
William F. Eddy	52	9.72%
Total Votes	535	100%

=== 1902 election ===
1902 Northwest Territories general election: South Regina
Name	Vote	%
James Hawkes	455	65.75%
J.W. Smith	237	34.25%
Total Votes	692	100%

=== 1905 Election ===
1905 Saskatchewan general election: South Regina
Party	Candidate	Votes	%	±%
Liberal	James Alexander Calder	872	52.15%	–
Provincial Rights	James Benjamin Hawkes	800	47.85%	–
Total		1,672	100.00%	
