= John Ryerson =

John Ryerson may refer to:

- John K. Ryerson (1820–1890), merchant and politician from Nova Scotia
- John Ryerson (tennis) (1862–1910), American tennis player

== See also ==
- John Ryerson Neff (1844–1913), farmer and politician from the Northwest Territories
