= Jacob W. Smith =

Canadian mayor and businessman (1851–1926)

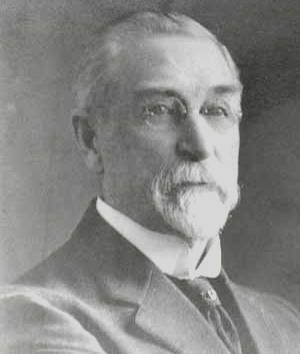
Jacob W. Smith Source: City of Regina Archives

Jacob W. Smith (November 25, 1851 – December 15, 1926) was a businessman and political figure in Saskatchewan, Canada. He was mayor of Regina in 1899, from 1902 to 1903 and from 1907 to 1908. He ran for the Territorial Legislature three times between 1894 and 1902, in the riding of South Regina. He lost each time, once to Daniel Mowat and twice to James Hawkes.

He was born in Carleton County, Canada West, the son of John Smith and Ann Jane Watson. He moved to western Ontario with his family in 1852. Smith learned the trade of metal worker. He married Mary Jane Bole in 1875. In 1883, he came to Regina, where he opened a store and later established a hardware, plumbing and sheet metal business with a partner. Smith sold his business in 1913. He was also in business for a time as a coal merchant. He was the first mayor to serve after Regina was incorporated as a city in 1903. Smith served on the school board for five years and was a justice of the peace, and was a firm believer in the principals of the Liberal Party. He died on December 15, 1926.
