= Assiniboia West =

Former federal electoral district in the North-West Territories, Canada

Alberta electoral district

Defunct federal electoral district
- Legislature: House of Commons
- District created: 1886
- District abolished: 1907
- First contested: 1887
- Last contested: 1904

Assiniboia West was a federal electoral district in the North-West Territories, Canada, that was represented in the House of Commons of Canada from 1886 to 1908.

This riding was created in 1886. When the provinces of Alberta and Saskatchewan were created in 1905, this district, with territory in both new provinces, continued to represent them until it was abolished in 1907. It was redistributed into Battleford, Medicine Hat, Moose Jaw, Regina, and Saskatoon ridings.

== Members of Parliament ==
Assiniboia West
Parliament	Years	Member	Party
7th	1887–1891	Nicholas Flood Davin	Conservative
7th	1891–1896	Nicholas Flood Davin	Conservative
8th	1896–1900	Nicholas Flood Davin	Conservative
9th	1900–1904	Thomas Walter Scott	Liberal
10th	1904–1906	Thomas Walter Scott	Liberal
10th	1906–1908	William Erskine Knowles	Liberal
District redistributed into Battleford, Medicine Hat, Moose Jaw, Regina, and Saskatoon

== Election results ==
=== 1906 by-election ===
Canadian federal by-election, February 6, 1906: Assiniboia East Resignation of Walter Scott to enter provincial politics
Party	Candidate	Votes
Conservative	William Erskine Knowles	acclaimed
Source: Library of Parliament

=== 1904 ===
1904 Canadian federal election
Party	Candidate	Votes	%	±%
Liberal	Walter Scott	3,647	56.00	+3.07
Conservative	George Malcolm Annable	2,865	44.00	–3.07
Total valid votes		6,512	100.00	
Total rejected ballots		unknown		
Turnout		6,512	75.99	–2.70
Eligible voters		8,569		
Liberal hold		Swing		+3.07
Source: Library of Parliament

=== 1900 ===
1900 Canadian federal election
Party	Candidate	Votes	%	±%
Liberal	Walter Scott	2,093	52.93	–
Conservative	Nicholas Flood Davin	1,861	47.07	–2.93
Total valid votes		3,954	100.00	
Total rejected ballots		unknown		
Turnout		3,954	78.69	–1.82
Eligible voters		5,025		
Liberal gain from Conservative		Swing		N/A
Source: Library of Parliament

=== 1896 ===
1896 Canadian federal election
Party	Candidate	Votes	%	±%
Conservative	Nicholas Flood Davin	1,502	50.00	–9.65
Independent	John K. McInnis	1,502	50.00	–
Total valid votes		3,004	100.00	
Total rejected ballots		unknown		
Turnout		3,004	80.51	+12.27
Eligible voters		3,731		
Conservative hold		Swing		N/A
Source: Library of Parliament

=== 1891 ===
1891 Canadian federal election
Party	Candidate	Votes	%	±%
Conservative	Nicholas Flood Davin	1,011	59.65	–3.54
Conservative	Thomas Tweed	684	40.35	–
Total valid votes		1,695	100.00	
Total rejected ballots		unknown		
Turnout		1,695	68.24	+7.29
Eligible voters		2,484		
Conservative hold		Swing		–3.54
Source: Library of Parliament

=== 1887 ===
1887 Canadian federal election
Party	Candidate	Votes	%
Conservative	Nicholas Flood Davin	726	63.19
Liberal	James Hamilton Ross	423	36.81
Total valid votes		1,149	100.00
Total rejected ballots		unknown	
Turnout		1,149	60.95
Eligible voters		1,885	
Source: Library of Parliament

== See also ==
- List of Canadian electoral districts
- Historical federal electoral districts of Canada
