= Charles Fisher (North-West Territories politician) =

Former Canadian politician

Member of the North-West Legislative Assembly for Batoche
- In office 1898–1905
- Preceded by: Charles Eugene Boucher
- Succeeded by: Abolished

Personal details
- Born: December 5, 1865 Manitoba
- Party: Independent
- Spouse: Louise Brabant (m. 1887)

Charles Fisher (December 5, 1865 – unknown) was a Canadian politician. He served on the North-West Legislative Assembly for Batoche from 1898 to 1905.

== Early life ==
Charles Fisher was born on December 5, 1965, to George Fisher (1830–1898) and Emily Boyer in Manitoba. He was educated at Université de Saint-Boniface and St. John's College. He married Louise Brabant on February 10, 1887.

== Political life ==
Fisher contested the 1898 North-West Territories general election in the Batoche, defeating incumbent Charles Eugene Boucher, 76 votes to 54. Fisher was re-elected in the 1902 North-West Territories general election, defeating Jean Baptiste Boucher, 174 votes to 109.
