= Amédée E. Forget =

Canadian politician (1847–1923)

The Honourable Amédée E. Forget
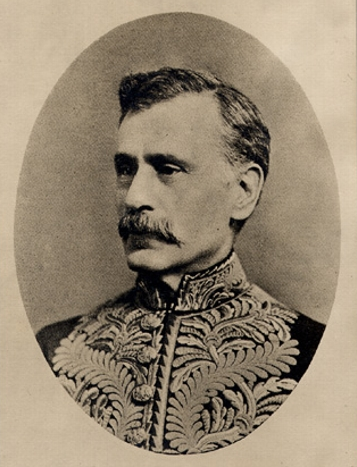

1st Lieutenant Governor of Saskatchewan
- In office September 1, 1905 – October 5, 1910
- Monarchs: Edward VII; George V
- Governor General: The Earl Grey
- Premier: Thomas Walter Scott
- Preceded by: Himself (as Lieutenant Governor of the North-West Territories)
- Succeeded by: George W. Brown

Lieutenant Governor of the North-West Territories
- In office October 4, 1898 – September 1, 1905
- Monarchs: Victoria; Edward VII
- Governors General: The Earl of Aberdeen; The Earl of Minto; The Earl Grey
- Premier: Frederick W. A. G. Haultain
- Preceded by: Malcolm C. Cameron
- Succeeded by: himself, as Lieutenant Governor of Saskatchewan; George H. V. Bulyea, as Lieutenant Governor of Alberta

Canadian Senator from Alberta
- In office May 2, 1911 – June 8, 1923
- Nominated by: Wilfrid Laurier

Personal details
- Born: November 12, 1847 Marieville, Canada East
- Died: June 8, 1923 (aged 75) Ottawa, Ontario, Canada
- Party: Liberal
- Spouse: Henriette Drolet (m. 1876)
- Education: Marieville College
- Occupation: Politician; lawyer; civil servant

Amédée Emmanuel Marie Forget (/fɔːrˈʒeɪ/; November 12, 1847 – June 8, 1923) was a Canadian lawyer, civil servant, and politician. He was the last lieutenant governor of the North-West Territories and the first lieutenant governor of Saskatchewan.

== Background ==
Born in Marieville, Canada East (now Quebec), the son of Jeremie Forget and Marie Guenette, he was called to the Bar of Lower Canada in 1871. In 1875, he joined the Canadian civil service and served in different positions. In 1898, he was appointed Lieutenant Governor of the North-West Territories on the advice of Prime Minister Wilfrid Laurier, and served until the creation of the provinces of Alberta and Saskatchewan in 1905. At that time, he was appointed the first lieutenant governor of Saskatchewan, and served until 1910. In 1911, he was appointed to the Senate of Canada representing the senatorial division of Banff, Alberta. He died while in office in 1923. He is buried in the Notre Dame des Neiges Cemetery in Montreal, Quebec.

== Other ==
He is the namesake of Mount Forget, in Alberta. The town of Forget, Saskatchewan, and Forget Street in Regina, Saskatchewan are both named in his honor.

== Family ==
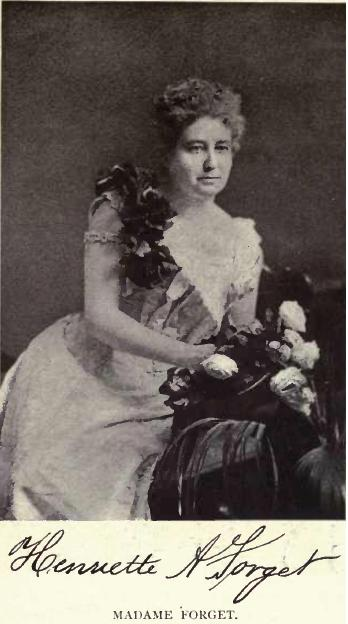
Madame Henriette Forget by William Notman

Amédée Emmanuel Forget married October 1876, Henriette Drolet, daughter of Lieutenant-Colonel C. J. R Drolet, and a descendant of François Jarret de Verchères. She was born at Saint-Hyacinthe, Canada East, September 29, 1853. She was educated at l'Institut des Sœurs des Saints Noms de Jésus et de Ville Marie, Hochelaga. The couple travelled in 1877 to Battleford, North-West Territories, when Mr Forget was appointed to an official position. When the seat of Government was transferred to Regina in 1882, the couple moved there. The couple moved to Winnipeg in 1895, when Mr. Forget was appointed Indian commissioner. The couple moved to Government House, Regina, when Mr Forget was appointed lieutenant-governor of the North-West Territories in October 1898. The couple received and entertained the Duke and Duchess of Cornwall in 1901.

Madame Forget served as honorary president of the Imperial Order Daughters of the Empire and of the National Council of Women. She volunteered with the Victorian Order of Nurses and the Aberdeen Association. She served as president and treasurer of the committee to erect a statue to Queen Victoria.

== Sources ==
- "The Honourable Amédée E. Forget, 1898-1905". Archived from the original on 27 October 2005.
- Titley, E. Brian (2005). "Forget, Amédée-Emmanuel". In Cook, Ramsay; Bélanger, Réal (eds.). Dictionary of Canadian Biography. Vol. XV (1921–1930) (online ed.). University of Toronto Press.
