= John K. McInnis =

Canadian educator, journalist, farmer and political figure

John Kenneth McInnis (September 29, 1853 – October 21, 1923) was an educator, journalist, farmer and political figure in Saskatchewan, Canada. He was mayor of Regina in 1899.

He was born in Strathalbyn, Prince Edward Island, the son of John McInnis, and was educated at Prince of Wales College and the Central Academy in Charlottetown. In 1874, he married Hannah Jane Carr. He served as principal at schools in Portage la Prairie, Manitoba, Moosomin and Wolseley. In 1891, he came to Regina and became editor of the Regina Journal, later renamed the Regina Standard. McInnis served on Regina city council from 1896 to 1898 and from 1915 to 1917 and from 1919 to 1922. He ran unsuccessfully for a seat in the House of Commons in the 1896 Canadian federal election in the Assiniboia West electoral district, tying his opponent and incumbent Nicholas Flood Davin, and subsequently losing on the tie-breaking vote of the Returning Officer, and would run again in 1908 Canadian federal election. In 1913, he retired from journalism to pursue farming, real estate and a printing and publishing business. He also served on the board of governors for the Regina General Hospital.

1896 Canadian federal election: Assiniboia West
Party	Candidate	Votes
Conservative	Nicholas Flood Davin	1,502
Independent	John K. McInnis	1,502
