= Mount Forget =

Mountain in Alberta and British Columbia, Canada

- Location within Alberta Location within British Columbia Location within Canada

Highest point
- Elevation: 2,121 m (6,959 ft)
- Prominence: 12 m (39 ft)
- Listing: Mountains of Alberta; Mountains of British Columbia
- Coordinates: 53°39′44″N 119°44′19″W

Geography
- Country: Canada
- Provinces: Alberta and British Columbia
- Parent range: Front Ranges
- Topo map: NTS 83E12 Pauline Creek

Mount Forget (/fɔːrˈʒeɪ/) is on the border of Alberta and British Columbia. It was named in 1925 after Amédée E. Forget.

== See also ==
- List of peaks on the British Columbia–Alberta border
