= William Ede =

William Ede may refer to:

- William Moore Ede, priest
- William Ede (MP) for New Shoreham (UK Parliament constituency)

== See also ==
- William Eddy (disambiguation)
