= Horace Greeley (politician) =

Canadian politician (1858–1935)

Member of the North-West Legislative Assembly for Medicine Hat
- In office 1898–1902
- Preceded by: Edward Fearon
- Succeeded by: William Finlay

Member of the North-West Legislative Assembly for Maple Creek
- In office May 21, 1902 – August 31, 1905
- Preceded by: first member
- Succeeded by: legislature dissolved

Personal details
- Born: 1858 Hudson, New Hampshire, United States
- Died: 1935 (aged 76–77) Maple Creek, Saskatchewan, Canada
- Party: Liberal-Conservative
- Occupation: merchant, rancher

Horace Albertie Greeley (1858 - 1935) was a Canadian politician, who represented Medicine Hat from 1898 to 1902, and Maple Creek from 1902 to 1905, in the North-West Legislative Assembly.

Born at Hudson, New Hampshire in 1858, he was a relative of American newspaper publisher Horace Greeley. He moved to Canada in 1879, settling first in Fort Walsh and later at Maple Creek. At Maple Creek he was manager of T.C. Power's general store, and later took up ranching.

He was elected to represent Medicine Hat in the 1898 North-West Territories general election, and sat as a supporter of Frederick W. A. G. Haultain's government. When the Medicine Hat riding was divided in the 1902 North-West Territories general election, Greeley ran in the new district of Maple Creek, winning reelection.

When the legislature was dissolved following the creation of the provinces of Alberta and Saskatchewan in 1905, Greeley did not run for election to the new Legislative Assembly of Saskatchewan. He then served as secretary and treasurer of Maple Creek's town government from 1906 to 1909.
