= Charles Eugene Boucher =

Canadian politician (1864 - 1926)

Member of the North-West Legislative Assembly for Batoche
- In office 1891–1898
- Preceded by: Hilliard Mitchell
- Succeeded by: Charles Fisher

Personal details
- Born: December 1, 1864 St. François Xavier, Rupert's Land
- Died: 1926 (aged 61–62)
- Party: Independent
- Spouse: Helene Letendre (m. 1886)
- Occupation: farmer

Charles Eugene Boucher (December 1, 1864 – February 1926) was a Canadian politician. He served on the North-West Legislative Assembly for Batoche from 1891 to 1898.

== Early life ==
Charles Eugene Boucher was born December 1, 1864, to Jean Baptiste Boucher and Caroline Lesperance. Boucher's maternal grandfather was voyageur Alexis Bonami. On August 18, 1886, Boucher married Helene Letendre, the daughter of François-Xavier Letendre.

== Political life ==
Boucher contested the Batoche electoral district in the 1891 North-West Territories general election. He initially lost the election to Charles Nolin, who was subsequently removed from office by a court order after being found guilty of bribery and fraud. Boucher was re-elected in the 1894 North-West Territories general election, defeating David Venne with 101 votes to 76. In the 1898 North-West Territories general election Boucher was defeated by Charles Fisher, 76 votes to 54.

== Later life ==
Boucher moved to Montana and lived in the Musselshell River area from 1898 to 1908 before returning to Saskatchewan. Boucher died in February 1926 at the age of 61.
