= William Plaxton =

Canadian politician

William Plaxton (1843–1907) was a Canadian politician who served as a Member of the Legislative Assembly of the Northwest Territories.

Plaxton ran for election for the first time in the 1888 Northwest Territories general election in the Prince Albert electoral district. During that election Prince Albert was a two-member constituency. Plaxton won the highest plurality coming in first, John Betts won the second seat and incumbent Owen Hughes was defeated finishing in third place.

Prince Albert was re-distributed under the North-West Representation Act passed in 1891. The district became a single member constituency and was broken up into Prince Albert East and Cumberland. Betts and Plaxton would run against each other in the Cumberland riding, with Betts winning the new district. Plaxton finished third in the three-way race.

Legislative Assembly of the Northwest Territories
Preceded by New District	MLA Prince Albert; 1888-1891	Succeeded by Thomas McKay
