= Alexander Thorburn =

Canadian politician

MLA for Whitewood
- In office 1888–1891
- Preceded by: New District
- Succeeded by: Daniel Campbell

Personal details
- Born: December 18, 1836 Edinburgh, Scotland
- Died: 1894 (aged 57–58)
- Party: Independent
- Spouse: Elizabeth Thorburn
- Occupation: Merchant, Real Estate Agent

Alexander "Alex" Gibbon "Gillion" "Gillan" Thorburn (December 18, 1836 – 1894) was a Canadian real estate agent, merchant, and politician. He served as a member of the Legislative Assembly of the Northwest Territories from 1888 until 1891. Prior to that, he was a school trustee.

== Early life ==
Thorburn was born on December 18, 1836, in Edinburgh, Scotland. His father was a manufacturer. He left Scotland when he was 20 years old, arriving in Lower Canada in 1856. He married his wife Elizabeth at Galt, Ontario, on July 1, 1863. After marriage, he moved to the Northwest Territories, settling in the town of Broadview. He started his own general store and became a real-estate agent for the Canada North-West Land Company. His first involvement with politics was on the municipal level when he became a school trustee.

== Political career ==
Thorburn was elected to the Northwest Territories Legislature in the first Northwest Territories general election held in 1888. He won a hotly contested three-way race in the Whitewood electoral district. In that race he defeated second place Thomas Lyons by eight votes and third place candidate John Hawkes by 63 votes winning the electoral district with almost 39% of the popular vote.

During his time in office, land was needed for settlement and local infrastructure in his district. On April 16, 1891, Thorburn and a committee petitioned Minister of Interior Edgar Dewdney who was visiting the area. The petition called for the surrender of surrounding land that was being used by the Kahkewistahaw First Nation. The constituents of Whitewood wanted the land to be opened up for settlement and the development of a Canadian Pacific Railway line. The petition was rejected by Dewdney.

Thorburn ran for a second term in office in the 1891 Northwest Territories general election. Despite marginally increasing his popular vote, he was defeated by Daniel Campbell finishing second with 41.5% of the popular vote and 19 votes behind Campbell. He finished well ahead of John Hawkes in the race, whose popular vote collapsed from the last election.

He died in 1894 and was buried at Broadview Cemetery.

Legislative Assembly of the Northwest Territories
Preceded by New District	MLA Whitewood; 1888-1891	Succeeded by Daniel Campbell
