= Edward Fearon =

Canadian politician (1859–1933)

Member of the North-West Legislative Assembly for Medicine Hat
- In office 1894–1898
- Preceded by: Thomas Tweed
- Succeeded by: Horace Greeley

Personal details
- Born: September 20, 1859 Scotland
- Died: November 3, 1933 (aged 74)
- Spouse: Annie Hastings (m. 1902)
- Occupation: rancher

Edward L. Fearon (September 20, 1859 – November 3, 1933) was a Canadian politician. He served on the North-West Legislative Assembly for Medicine Hat from 1894 to 1898.

== Early life ==
Fearon was born September 20, 1859, in Scotland. Fearon moved to Kingston, Ontario, in 1878 and joined the North-West Mounted Police where he was stationed at Fort Walsh.

== Political life ==
Fearon contested the 1894 North-West Territories general election in the Medicine Hat electoral district against incumbent Thomas Tweed. In the years prior to the election, the Medicine Hat community became divided with Tweed around the issues of prohibition, hospital supply purchasing and obtaining government contracts for friends. Fearon was a popular rancher near Maple Creek. During the campaign Tweed's opponents depicted him as hostile to labour, against provincehood, and an ineffective representative. Fearon defeated Tweed with 398 votes to Tweed's 309. Fearon did not contest the 1898 North-West Territories general election. When describing Fearon's term in office, Historian L.J. Roy Wilson described Fearon as a "very poor representative".

== Later life ==
Fearon joined the Klondike Gold Rush in 1898 and returned to ranching in Maple Creek in 1901. In 1902 he married Annie Hastings. Fearon died on November 3, 1933, at the age of 74.
