= Benjamin Parkyn Richardson =

Canadian politician

Canadian prairie pioneer Benjamin Parkyn Richardson.

Benjamin Parkyn Richardson (22 July 1857 – 8 August 1910) was a member of the first North-West Legislative Assembly in Northwest Territories, Canada, from 20 June 1888 until 10 October 1891. He settled in present-day Saskatchewan in 1884.

== Early life ==
Richardson was the third son of the Reverend George Thomas Richardson (1822–1888), Methodist Minister of Toronto Conference, who came to Canada from Cornwall, England in 1854. He was born at Blenheim in York County, Canada West in 1857.

Richardson was educated at the county public schools and Uxbridge High School. He taught school for six years at Uxbridge, and then engaged in farming and stock-raising. He married Margaret Ethel Austin (1856–1928) of Clough Jordon, Tipperary, Ireland, at Philadelphia, Pennsylvania, on 3 October 1882. In 1884, Richardson settled in the North-West Territories and established himself as a farmer and stock breeder.

== Public life ==
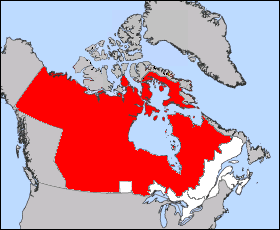
From 1868 to 1905, NWT covered much of Canada. Its first capital was Fort Pelly, followed by Battleford

Legislative Assembly of the North-West Territories

In politics a Liberal-Conservative, having unbounded faith in the North-West and in its future greatness; believing in every effort possible being made to develop the resources of the North-West, in assistance to Agricultural Societies and in the maintenance of a through national educational system. Personally a Prohibitionist, favoring a speedy settlement of the liquor question by a ballot vote of the people.

— North-West Territories Gazette, 1888

Richardson earned 209 votes to be elected as member for Wolseley (in present-day Saskatchewan) in 1888. He campaigned again and lost in the 1891 Northwest Territories general election, earning 213 votes, while his opponent, James Dill, earned 312. Richardson ran a third time for election in Grenfell in the 1898 Northwest Territories general election, earning 153 votes, while his opponent, Richard Stuart Lake, earned 351. Five general elections would occur between 1888 and 1905, as the territories underwent significant growth. As an assembly member, Richardson was twice appointed to the Advisory Council of Lieutenant Governor Joseph Royal. He also served on its Education, Irrigation, Municipal, and Prairie and Forest Fires committees, among others. Samples of his correspondence with Lieutenant Governor Edgar Dewdney are housed in the archives of the Glenbow Museum in Calgary (Alberta).

Other Involvement

In the death of Benjamin Parkyn Richardson, the district of Grenfell has lost one of its early pioneers and the town one of its most prominent and active citizens. Coming to what was then Grenfell in the spring of 1884, he at once identified himself with the interests of the West, at that time still uncertain, its future success- doubtful. The difficulties and discouragement of those early years, is still fresh and green in the memories of some who are still with us, but who, like him whose loss we now deplore, have lived to see the full dawn of a brighter day, and a truer knowledge of the land we live in.

— Grenfell Sun, 1910

Richardson served as first president of the Grenfell Agricultural Society formed in 1884, director of the Hospital Board, chairman of the Public School Board, and editor of the Grenfell Sun, of which he was a founder. He was the first vice-president on the Board of Governors of Regina College at the time of its foundation (what has become the University of Regina). As an active member of the Methodist Church, Richardson was vice-president of its Bible Society and the Lord's Day Alliance, a movement founded to combat Sabbath secularisation. He was also director of the Grenfell Cheese Company and Inspector of Agencies for the London and Lancashire Life Assurance Company in Manitoba and the North-West Territories.

Richardson died suddenly at age fifty-three of what was diagnosed as Bright's Disease. His funeral service was reported to be crowded at the doors of the local church, and the procession to have numbered over one hundred carriages and to be more than one mile in length. He was survived by his wife and seven children.

== See also ==
- List of Northwest Territories general elections
- Robert G. Brett, first territorial assembly chairman

Legislative Assembly of the Northwest Territories
Preceded by New District	MLA Wolseley; 1888–1891	Succeeded by James Dill
