= Charles Nolin =

Canadian politician

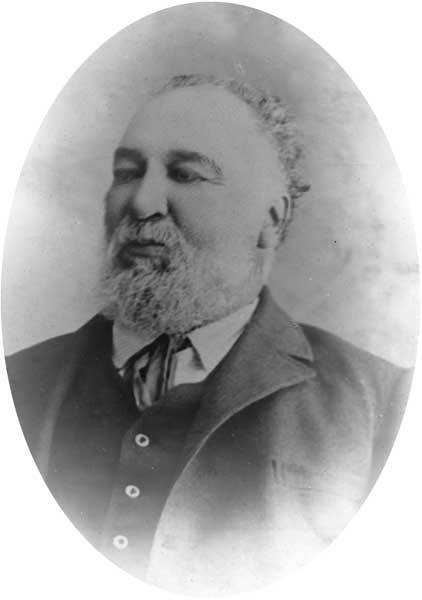

Legislative Assembly of the Northwest Territories
- In office 1891–1892

Personal details
- Born: 2 May 1838 Saint Boniface, Rupert's Land
- Died: 28 January 1907 (aged 68) Battleford, Saskatchewan, Canada
- Spouses: Marie-Anne Harrison; Rosalie Lépine
- Children: 20

Charles Nolin (2 March 1838 – 28 January 1907) was a Métis farmer and political organizer noted for his role in the opposition of the North-West Resistance of 1885. He was educated by the bishop Provencher, then worked as a fur trader and a merchant.

== Personal life ==
Nolin was born in 1838 at Saint Boniface to Augustin Nolin and Helen Ann Cameron. Nolin died January 28, 1907, at Battleford.

== North-West Resistance (1885) ==
Through lack of representation in the government of the North-West Territories and the lack of response to several petitions by the Métis, the roots of the North-West Resistance began. In 1884, Charles Nolin and Maxime Lépine organized a committee that consisted of Métis people and desired to improve the recognition of their rights. Along with his first cousin Louis Riel, Nolin initially took part in Riel's Council at Batoche during the resistance. Although, he distanced himself from Riel in terms of advocated taking up arms in order to resolve Métis grievances with the Canadian government. His stance had changed following Riel's estrangement from the Roman Catholic clerics of the Saint-Laurent mission.

== 1885 trial ==
In 1885, the Council of the Provisional government tried Nolin, along with William Boyer. They were put on trial for their actions in the North-West Resistance which were deemed to have been acting against the cause. However, Nolin and Boyer pledged allegiance and were then acquitted of their charges. Although he was Riel's cousin, Nolin testified against him at his trial. His statements and testimonies during Riel's trial, have been said to have contributed to Riel's sentence of death. Nolin opposed Riel in both 1870, and also in 1885.

== Political Career after the North-West Resistance ==
He was elected as the member for Batoche, Northwest Territories in the 1891 election for the Legislative Assembly of the Northwest Territories, actively supporting the Dominion government. He was forced out of office a year later by court order.

== See also ==
- Indigenous Canadian personalities

Legislative Assembly of the Northwest Territories
| Preceded by Hilliard Mitchell | MLA Batoche; 1891–1892 | Succeeded by Charles Eugene Boucher |
