= Joseph Benjamin Prince =

Canadian politician

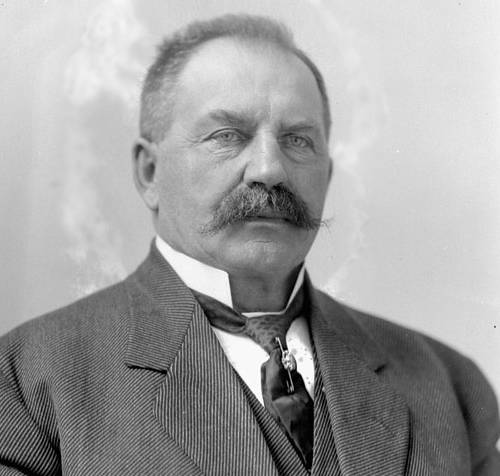
Joseph Benjamin Prince Source: Library and Archives Canada

Joseph Benjamin Prince (April 29, 1855 – October 25, 1920) was a farmer, rancher and political figure in Saskatchewan, Canada. He represented Battleford in the Legislative Assembly of the Northwest Territories from 1898 to 1905 as an Independent. Prince sat as a Liberal for Saskatchewan division in the Senate of Canada from 1909 to 1920 following his appointment by Sir Wilfrid Laurier.

He was born in St-Grégoire, Canada East, the son of Benjamin Prince and Louise Bourdage. He worked with a surveying corps for a time, then went to Winnipeg with his brother. He later moved further west to Battleford. Prince built the first sawmill there and, with a partner, the first flour mill. He also raised livestock and opened a department store in Battleford in 1898. In 1887, he married Ernestine Brassard. Prince served in the Home Guard during the North-West Rebellion. He was mayor of Battleford from 1907 to 1909. Prince died in office at the age of 65.

His son Paul later served in the Saskatchewan assembly.
