= Nicholas Flood Davin =

Canadian politician (1840–1901)

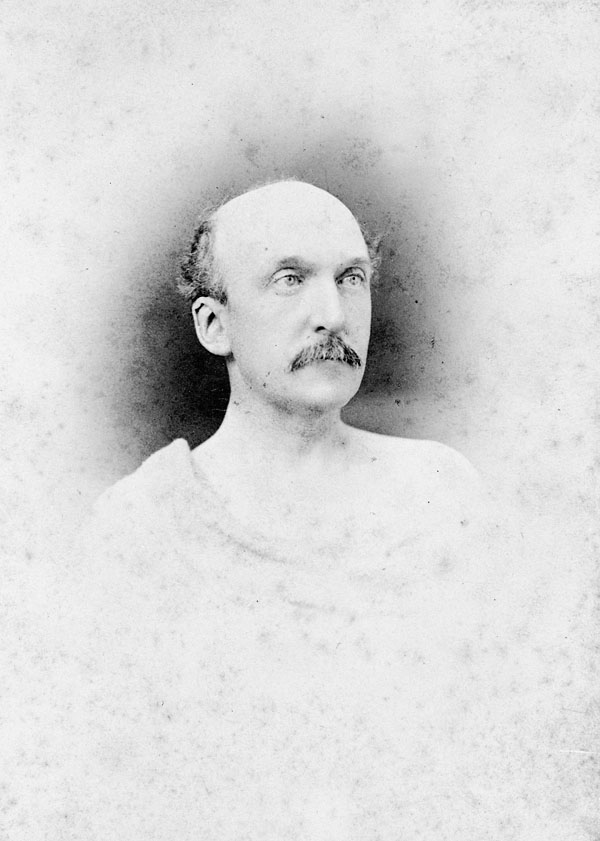
- Born: January 13, 1840; Kilfinane, County Limerick, (Ireland (U.K.))
- Died: October 18, 1901 (aged 61); Winnipeg, Manitoba, Canada
- Cause of death: Suicide by gunshot
- Resting place: Beechwood Cemetery
- Education: Queen's College Cork
- Occupations: Writer, publisher, politician
- Notable work: The Irishman in Canada, Davin Report

Member of the Canadian Parliament for Assiniboia West
- In office 1887–1900
- Preceded by: Electoral district created
- Succeeded by: Thomas Walter Scott

Personal details
- Party: Conservative Party of Canada (1867–1942)

Nicholas Flood Davin, KC (January 13, 1840 – October 18, 1901) was a lawyer, journalist and politician, born at Kilfinane, Ireland (then part of the United Kingdom). The first MP for Assiniboia West (1887–1900), Davin was known as the voice of the North-West.

Davin founded and edited the Regina Leader, the first newspaper in Assiniboia. He tried to gain provincial status for the territory.

Davin is considered one of the architects of the Canadian Indian residential school system. In 1879 he wrote the Report on Industrial Schools for Indians and Half-Breeds, otherwise known as The Davin Report, in which he advised the federal government to institute residential schools for Indigenous children. In 2015, the Truth and Reconciliation Commission concluded that the assimilation amounted to cultural genocide.

== Early life in Ireland and England ==
He was the only son of Nicholas Davin, doctor, and Eliza Davin (née Lane). Davin's own telling of his early life is the subject to doubt. It is thought he falsified his middle name, the year of his birth, his father’s occupation, and a claimed Catholic background. It is believed that his father died young and he was raised as a Protestant by his uncle, an apothecary. He was briefly apprenticed to a ironmonger before being admitted to Queen's College Cork, where he attended for only a year before moving to London. He claimed to have studied at the University of London but there is no record to support this. Davin entered the Middle Temple in London to study law and was called to the bar on January 27, 1868.

Despite being trained in law, while in England he mostly work in journalism, as editor of the Monthly Journal, parliamentary reporter for The Star, and war correspondent for the Standard and the Irish Times during the Franco-Prussian War. In 1872 he returned to Ireland to edit the Belfast Times, but was dismissed after five months amid lawsuits and allegations of drunkenness.

== Toronto years ==
He then moved to Toronto in 1872, where he wrote for The Globe as the literary critic until 1875 when he switched to freelance work, especially for the Mail. He was again called to the bar of Ontario in 1876, but concentrated on his literary career and not the law.

He made his reputation in politics by delivering a speech against republicanism and materialism and in defence of order upheld by monarchy; this was later published in book form as British versus American civilization (1873). He then help to found the Toronto branch of the youth section of the Liberal-Conservative Party in 1876.

He found government work in 1873 as secretary to the Royal Commission investigating the Pacific Scandal chaired by Charles Dewey Day and again in 1885 as secretary to the Royal Commission on Chinese Immigration.

Davin's major early non-fiction work was The Irishman in Canada (1877) a history of the Irish diaspora (mainly, but not only, in Canada) which focused on famous personalities rather than social trends. He asserted that in the New World the division between Catholics and Protestants was irrelevant and the communities would merge into a pan-denominational "Irish" identity.

He also wrote poetry and an unpublished novel.

The highlight of his legal career was his 1880 defence of George Bennett, who murdered George Brown.

== Move to West ==
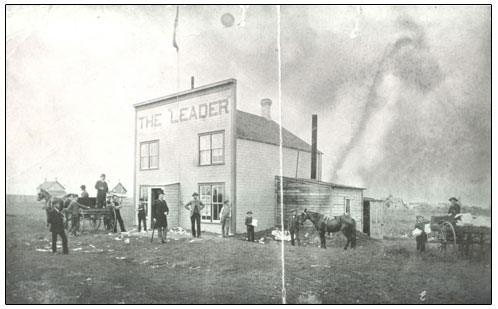
The first Leader Building, Regina, Assiniboia

A chance visit to the West in 1882 determined his future. In 1883, he founded and edited the Regina Leader, the first newspaper in Assiniboia, which carried his detailed reports of the 1885 trial of Louis Riel. A spellbinding speaker and Conservative MP for Assiniboia West from 1887 to 1900, Davin tried to gain provincial status for the territory, economic, and property advantages for the new settlers, even the franchise for women, but he never achieved his ambition to be a Cabinet minister. A mercurial personality, he became depressed by the decline of his political and personal fortunes, and he shot himself during a visit to Winnipeg on October 18, 1901.

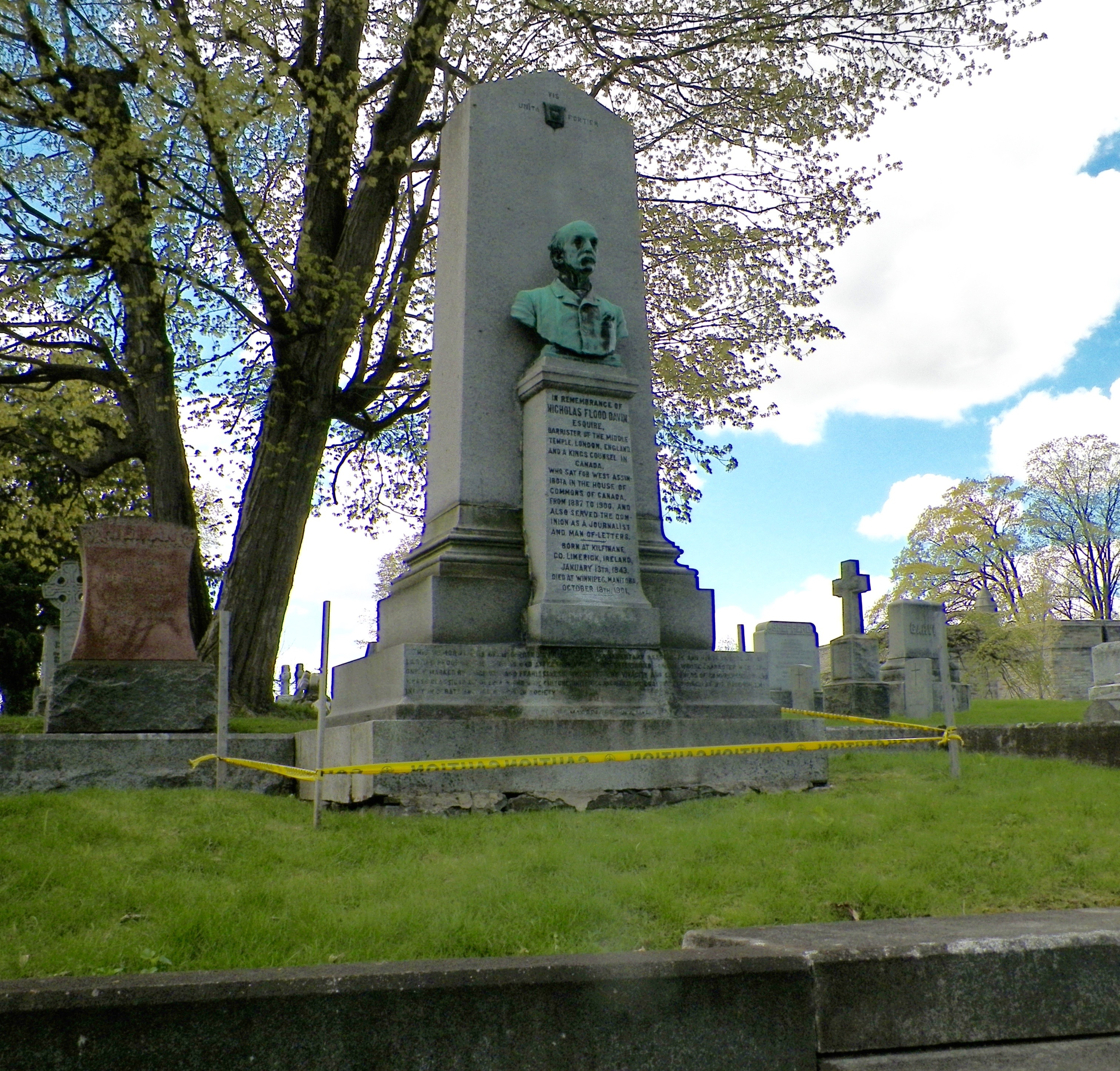
Nicholas Flood Davin grave site at Beechwood National Cemetery, Ottawa, ON Canada.

Upon his death, his colleagues in Ottawa had his body sent from Winnipeg to Ottawa to be buried in Beechwood National Cemetery. The epitaph, carved in stone beneath a plinth upon which his bust in bronze is ensconced, reads: "This monument has been erected by his former parliamentary associates and other people as a lasting proof of the esteem and affection which they entertained (sic) on one whose character was strongly marked by sincerity and fearlessness, whose mind by vivacity and clearness of comprehension and whose classical scholarship and wide culture united to his brilliant oration and singular wit made him intent in debate and delightful in society."

== The Davin Report ==
Davin is considered one of the architects of the Canadian Indian residential school system. In 1879, he was sent by the Canadian government to investigate Indian Education in the US. In his report, Davin applauded US efforts to concentrate Indigenous peoples on reservations, divide the communal territory into individually owned parcels of land, and prepare Indigenous children for citizenship through industrial education.

Davin believed industrial boarding schools were superior to day schools, where children returned to their homes after a day’s education and were still under the ‘influence of the wigwam’. The industrial boarding school was in his view the best option for Indians ‘to be merged and lost’ within the nation. But Davin also felt that the migratory nature of Indigenous groups in the northwest made the extensive establishment of industrial boarding schools expensive and inefficient; he argued Canada should use its already existing network of denominational missions for the residential schooling system. Soon after his report, several government-sponsored boarding schools opened.

== Authorship ==
Davin used, among others, the literary device of inter-textuality to draw upon British canonical writers including Tennyson, Byron, and Shakespeare to connect the associations of empire with his 19th-century audience. In 1876, Davin wrote an adaptation of Shakespeare's Romeo and Juliet entitled The Fair Grit; or The Advantages of Coalition. A Farce. The play is a farce on governmental coalitions and the corrupted role of media in Canadian politics – a power fully realized by Davin as a writer and founder of the Regina Leader newspaper located in Canada’s North-West.

Three years later, Davin produced the Report on Industrial Schools for Indians and Half-Breeds, otherwise known as The Davin Report (1879), in which he advised John A. Macdonald’s federal government to institute residential schools for Indigenous youth; the recommendation led, in part, to the establishment of the Canadian Indian residential school system that decimated Canadian Aboriginal families.

In 1884, while visiting Ottawa, Davin wrote Eos – A Prairie Dream (1884), a collection of poems that, in his own words, "strike a true and high note in Canadian politics and literature" while he represents, through his poetry, the destruction of Aboriginal culture.

== Gunhilda Letters ==
Nicholas Flood Davin complimented the 'Gunhilda letters' "for felicity of expression, cogency of reasoning, fierceness of invective, keenness of satire and piquancy of style" and "Nothing equal to them has appeared in the Canadian press for years." In 1881, Susan Anna Wiggins used the nom de plume 'Gunhilda' to write the Gunhilda Letters--Marriage with a Deceased Husband's Sister: Letters of a Lady to [John Travers Lewis], the Right Rev. the Lord Bishop of Ontario, which consisted of letters of support for Mr. Girouard's bill regarding the legalization of marriage with a deceased wife's sister, long-time prohibited by British law at home and overseas. The Gunhilda Letters were dedicated to the members of the Senate of Canada and of the House of Commons of Canada who supported Mr. Girouard's Bill.

== Electoral record ==
1887 Canadian federal election: Assiniboia West
Party	Candidate	Votes	%
Conservative	Nicholas Flood Davin	726	63.19
Liberal	James Hamilton Ross	423	36.81
Total valid votes		1,149	100.00
Total rejected ballots		unknown	
Turnout		1,149	60.95
Eligible voters		1,885	
Source: Library of Parliament

1891 Canadian federal election: Assiniboia West
Party	Candidate	Votes	%	±%
Conservative	Nicholas Flood Davin	1,011	59.65	–3.54
Conservative	Thomas Tweed	684	40.35	–
Total valid votes		1,695	100.00	
Total rejected ballots		unknown		
Turnout		1,695	68.24	+7.29
Eligible voters		2,484		
Conservative hold		Swing		–3.54
Source: Library of Parliament

1896 Canadian federal election: Assiniboia West
Party	Candidate	Votes	%	±%
Conservative	Nicholas Flood Davin	1,502	50.00	–9.65
Independent	John K. McInnis	1,502	50.00	–
Total valid votes		3,004	100.00	
Total rejected ballots		unknown		
Turnout		3,004	80.51	+12.27
Eligible voters		3,731		
Conservative hold		Swing		N/A
Source: Library of Parliament

1900 Canadian federal election: Assiniboia West
Party	Candidate	Votes	%	±%
Liberal	Walter Scott	2,093	52.93	–
Conservative	Nicholas Flood Davin	1,861	47.07	–2.93
Total valid votes		3,954	100.00	
Total rejected ballots		unknown		
Turnout		3,954	78.69	–1.82
Eligible voters		5,025		
Liberal gain from Conservative		Swing		N/A
Source: Library of Parliament
