= Oswald Critchley =

Canadian politician

Oswald Asheton Critchley (27 March 1864 in Manchester – 4 November 1935 in Bushmills, Northern Ireland) was a Canadian territorial level politician, rancher and also served as a soldier in the Canadian Forces during World War I.

== Personal life ==
Critchley began ranching in Southern Alberta in the 1880s. He purchased the Stapleton Ranch which was situated on the Bow River. His first wife, Maria Newbolt, had two sons. She died during the birth of her second son. Critchley quickly remarried to Ms. Winifred Holt.

== Political career ==
In the 1894 Northwest Territories general election Critchley ran for a seat in the West Calgary electoral district. He defeated two other candidates coming out on top of a close three-way split to capture the district.

Critchley only served in the Northwest Territories Legislature for a single term, choosing not to run again at the dissolution of the Legislature in 1898. He sold his first ranch a year later in 1899 and returned to England.

== Post political life ==
He moved back to Alberta and returned to ranching. In 1909, he purchased the Bell-Irving ranch in Grand Valley and continued ranching until the outbreak of World War I. He enlisted in the Canadian Expeditionary Force with his two sons. All three served with Lord Strathcona's Horse and saw combat in France. After the war he moved back to London, England and stayed the rest of his life until he died in 1935.

Legislative Assembly of the Northwest Territories
Preceded by New District	MLA West Calgary; 1894–1898	Succeeded by Richard Bennett
