= Cumberland (territorial electoral district) =

Former territorial electoral district in the North-West Territories, Canada

Cumberland was an electoral district in the North-West Territories from 1891–1894, the riding was in the rural area to the northeast of Prince Albert, Saskatchewan. Cumberland disappeared in 1894 when it merged with the newly created Prince Albert East.

A new incarnation of the Cumberland district has existed in Saskatchewan from 1912 to present.

== Election results 1891 ==
Only one election took place in the Cumberland district. Its results were:

1891 Results
Candidate	Votes	%
John Felton Betts	159	51.96%
Philip Turnor	106	34.64%
William Plaxton	41	13.40%

== See also ==
- List of Northwest Territories territorial electoral districts
- Canadian provincial electoral districts
