= James Clinkskill =

Canadian politician

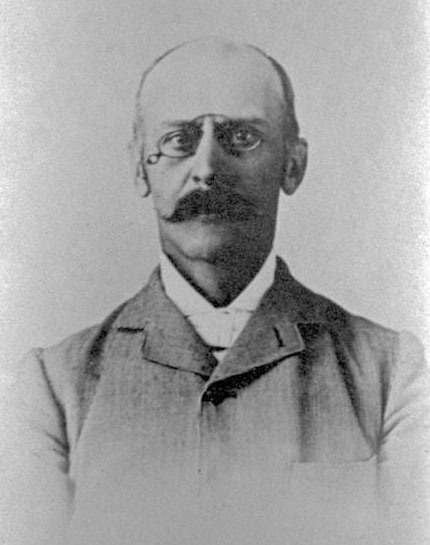
Clinkskill in 1896.

James Clinkskill (May 9, 1853 – August 6, 1936) was a British-Canadian politician and engineer, merchant, author and justice of the peace. He was born in Glasgow, United Kingdom, in 1853.

== Early life ==
Clinkskill was educated at St. Andrews University and Madras College. He worked as a shop keeper in Scotland before emigrating to Canada in 1881. He moved to the Northwest Territories in 1882. In 1884, he got married.

== Political career ==
=== Northwest Territories Assembly ===
Clinkskill was first elected to the Legislative Assembly of the Northwest Territories, winning the Battleford electoral district. He ran in the 1888 Northwest Territories general election and defeated Daniel Livingstone Clink in a hotly contested battle by 24 votes. He would run for a second term in office in the 1891 Northwest Territories general election, slightly increasing his margin of victory. He was re-elected for a third term in the 1894 Northwest Territories general election. After his third term expired in 1898 Clinkskill did not run again for his seat. He returned to territorial politics by running in a by-election held on December 9, 1902. The by-election was held in the Saskatoon electoral district; he won, defeating candidate Benjamin Chubb by 14 votes.

=== Mayor of Saskatoon ===
Clinkskill became Mayor of Saskatoon for the first time in 1906. He would serve a second stint as Mayor from 1911 to 1912. In commemoration of his work as mayor, Clinkskill Drive in the neighbourhood of Nutana Park is named in his honour.

== Published works ==
Three books were published about James Clinkskill, written by Arthur Morten and Co authored by Clinkskill himself the books feature his memories about his life in the early days as Mayor of Saskatoon Saskatchewan.

- Reminiscences of a pioneer in Saskatchewan. 1927. (Co authored with Arthur Morton)
- Narrative of ex-mayor James Clinkskill. 1927. (Co authored with Arthur Morton)
- Narratives of Saskatoon, 1882–1912. 1927. (Co authored with Arthur Morton)

Legislative Assembly of the Northwest Territories
New district	MLA Battleford; 1888–1898	Succeeded by Benjamin Prince
Preceded by William Henry Sinclair	MLA Saskatoon; 1902–1905	District abolished
