= William F. Eddy =

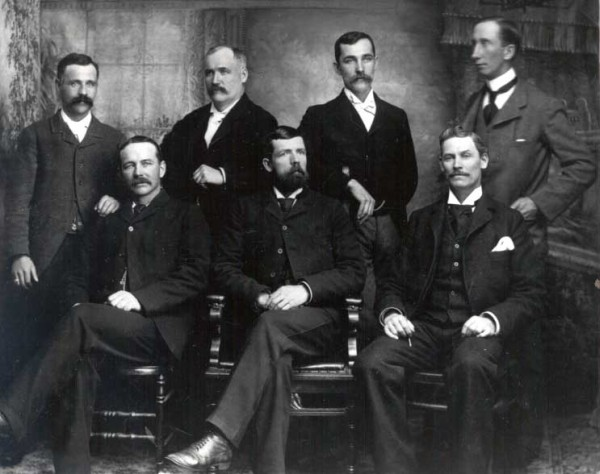
- 1896 Regina Town Council, W.F. Eddy sitting in the front row, middle

Mayor of Regina
- In office 1896–1897
- Preceded by: George T. Marsh
- Succeeded by: Francis Nicholson Darke

Personal details
- Born: August 9, 1852 Newcastle, Canada West
- Died: August 3, 1930 (aged 77) Regina, Saskatchewan
- Spouse: Winnifed Vanderwater
- Occupation: builder

William Franklin Eddy (August 9, 1852 – August 3, 1930) was a builder and political figure in Saskatchewan, Canada. He was mayor of Regina from 1896 to 1897. In 1898 he attempted to enter the Territorial Legislature, but was defeated by James Hawkes, coming in third place.

He was born in Newcastle, Canada West, the son of James T. Eddy and Mary A. Clark, and was educated there and at Albert College in Belleville. He then apprenticed as a mason and builder with his father, building a number of churches in Ontario. Eddy came to Regina in 1882 and built a number of buildings there in partnership with George B. Rice. In 1886, he returned to Newcastle to build a church; Eddy returned to Regina in 1890 and built a number of houses for sale there, as well as other residences, farm houses and other buildings. He retired from construction in 1905. In 1911, he built the Eddy Apartments, where he lived later in life. Eddy was married twice: to Labernia C. Wetherwell in 1875 and to Winnifed Vanderwater in 1886.
