= Joseph Bannerman =

Canadian politician (1850–1932)

Member of the Legislative Assembly of the Northwest Territories for East Calgary
- In office October 1894 – November 1898
- Succeeded by: Alfred Ernest Cross

Personal details
- Born: March 12, 1850 Helmsdale, Scotland
- Died: April 17, 1932 (aged 82) Calgary, Alberta, Canada
- Party: Independent

Joseph McKay Bannerman (March 12, 1850 – April 17, 1932) was a Canadian politician. He served on the Legislative Assembly of the Northwest Territories for East Calgary from 1894 to 1898. He was one of Calgary's first members of the legislature.

Bannerman was born at Helmsdale, Scotland, the son of Thomas and Barbara (née McKay) Bannerman. He married Christina Sutherland (also Scottish), of Winnipeg in 1885; with her he had five children. After Christina's death in 1907, he married English-born Emma Northfield. After Emma's death in 1917, he married her sister, Ruth. Bannerman came to Alberta, settling in Edmonton in 1882, and Calgary the year after. With his brother, he was a flour and feed as well as liquor merchant. A Protestant, he also served at a time as a City of Calgary alderman in the 1880s. Though he was politically affiliated with the Conservative Party of Canada, he served as an Independent in the Legislative Assembly.

He was elected in 1894 to the Legislative Assembly of the Northwest Territories, and served until his defeat in 1898. Upon his defeat, he lived in Banff, Alberta. He died in Calgary in 1932.

== Electoral results ==
=== 1894 election ===
October 31, 1894 election
Name	Vote
Joseph Bannerman	209
S.J. Clarke	190
N.J. Lindsay	117
Patrick James Nolan	57
James Reilly	50
Total Votes	623

=== 1898 election ===
November 4, 1898 election
Name	Vote
Alfred Ernest Cross	182
S.J. Clarke	127
James Reilly	120
Joseph Bannerman	119
Total Votes	548
