= W. Cayley Hamilton =

Canadian barrister and politician

William Cayley Hamilton QC (c. 1858 – October 2, 1901) was a Canadian barrister and politician. He was mayor of Regina, Saskatchewan in 1888. In 1898 he founded The Law Society of the Northwest Territories and became its first president.
