= George Davidson (politician) =

Canadian politician

George Senze Davidson (born: c. 1850 Ohio – died: 1935) was a hotel owner, farmer and politician from the Northwest Territories, Canada.

He came to Perth County in Canada West with his parents in 1852. From 1870 to 1876, Davidson was printer and publisher of the Listowel Banner. He then moved to Palmerston, where he was a general merchant and served as town mayor, resigning in 1883 to move to the Northwest.

Davidson was first elected to the Legislative Assembly of the Northwest Territories in the 1888 Northwest Territories general election for the riding of South Qu'Appelle. He ran for a second term in office in the 1891 Northwest Territories general election defeating George Bulyea. Davidson was defeated running for a third term in office by Bulyea in the 1894 Northwest Territories general election

Legislative Assembly of the Northwest Territories
Preceded by New District	MLA South Qu'Appelle; 1888–1894	Succeeded by George Bulyea
