= James Hoey (politician) =

Canadian politician

James Hoey (1828 – September 14, 1903) was an Irish-born farmer and political figure in the Northwest Territories, Canada. He represented Kinistino in the Legislative Assembly of the Northwest Territories from 1888 to 1891.

== Biography ==
He was born in County Kilkenny and came to Grey County in Canada West in 1852. Hoey first settled in Binbrook township, where he served on the council for 21 years and was reeve. Hoey served in the militia during the Fenian raids. In 1882, he moved to the Northwest Territories. Hoey served during the North-West Rebellion. He died in Prince Albert.
