= George H. V. Bulyea =

Canadian politician (1859–1928)

The Honourable George H. V. Bulyea
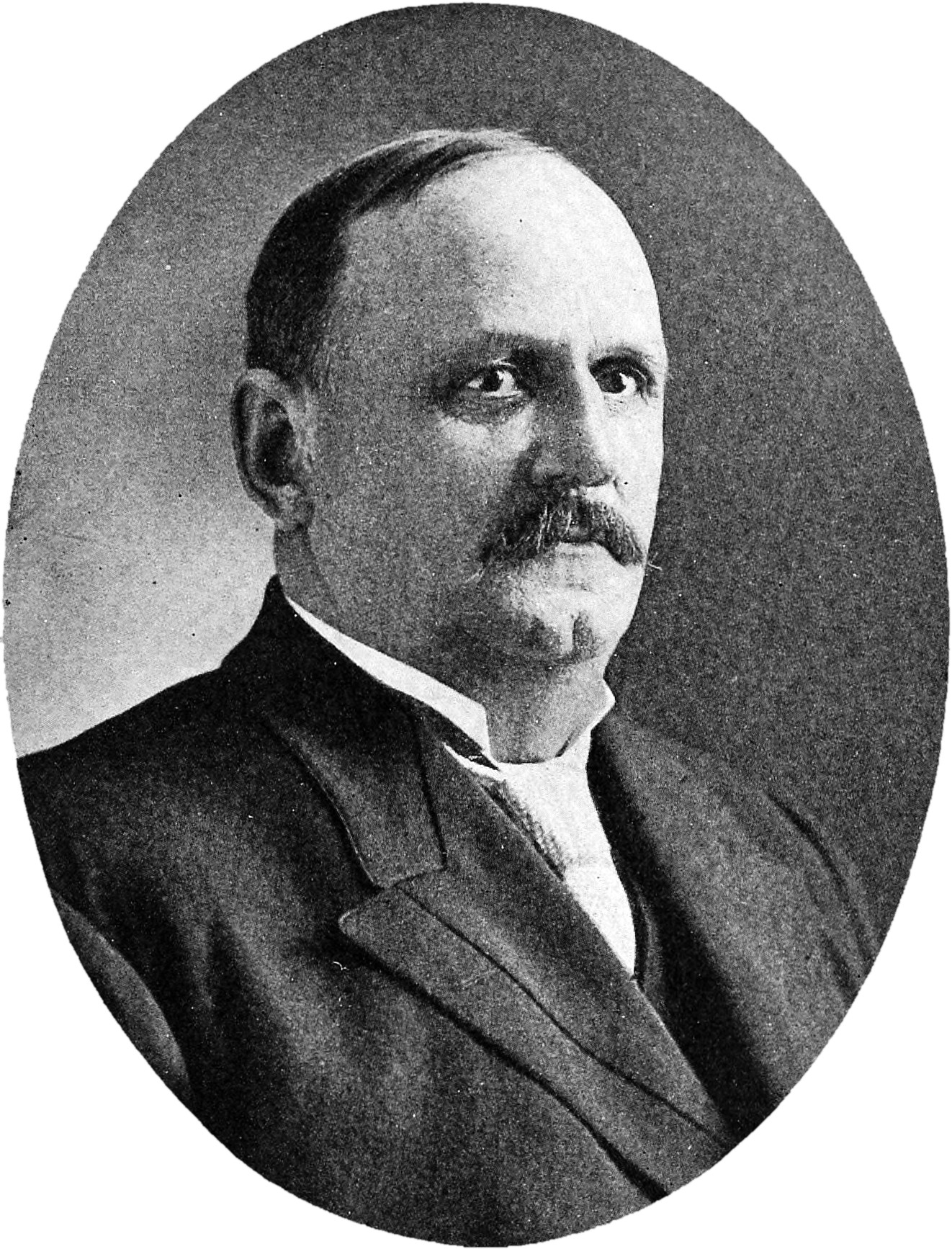

1st Lieutenant Governor of Alberta
- In office September 1, 1905 – October 20, 1915
- Monarchs: Edward VII; George V
- Governors General: the Earl Grey; The Duke of Connaught and Strathearn
- Premier: Alexander C. Rutherford; Arthur Sifton
- Preceded by: Amédée E. Forget (as Lieutenant Governor of the North-west Territories)
- Succeeded by: Robert Brett

MLA for South Qu'Appelle
- In office October 31, 1894 – September 1, 1905
- Preceded by: George Davidson
- Succeeded by: District abolished

Personal details
- Born: George Hedley Vicars Bulyea; February 17, 1859 Gagetown, New Brunswick
- Died: July 22, 1928 (aged 69) Peachland, British Columbia, Canada
- Party: Liberal-Conservative
- Spouse: Annie Blanche Babbit (m. 1885) (1863–1934)
- Children: Percy McFarlane (1885–1901)
- Education: University of New Brunswick
- Occupation: Teacher, businessman, politician
- Profession: Politician
- Cabinet: Administrator of Territorial Affairs in the Yukon (1898-1905)

George Hedley Vicars Bulyea (February 17, 1859 – July 22, 1928) was a Canadian politician and the first Lieutenant Governor of Alberta. As the youngest ever Lieutenant Governor, at age 46, he was appointed by Governor General Earl Grey on advice of Prime Minister of Canada Sir Wilfrid Laurier on September 1, 1905.

He spent many years in the service of the territorial and provincial governments and played an important role in the early history of the Province of Alberta.

== Early life ==
George Hedley Vicars Bulyea was born on February 17, 1859, in Gagetown, Queen's County, New Brunswick, to James Albert Bulyea, and Jane Blizzard, two prosperous farmers. Bulyea was a descendant of United Empire Loyalists, with his great-grandparents being born in New York. James Albert Bulyea served as a captain with the 1st Battalion of the Queens County Militia, headquartered in Gagetown, his birthplace.

He was educated at the Gagetown Grammar School and graduated from the University of New Brunswick, Fredericton, in 1878, with a Bachelor of Arts degree. He was first in his class with honors in mathematics and French.

After graduation from university, Bulyea decided to pursue a teaching career. He served as principal of the Sheffield Grammar School, Sudbury County, New Brunswick, from 1878, until 1882. In 1883, he moved to Western Canada, and settled initially in Winnipeg, Manitoba. In 1883, he moved to Qu'Appelle, District of Assiniboia, North-West Territories (now Saskatchewan), a town just east of Regina. Up until 1898, he worked as a merchant, in which he dealt flour and feed. He served as the first treasurer of Qu'Appelle, when it was formed as a municipality, in 1886.

On January 29, 1885, he married Annie Blanche Babbit, the second daughter of Robert Thorne Babbit, Registrar of Queens County, New Brunswick. They had one son in 1885, Percy McFarlane Bulyea, who died at the age of fifteen on February 5, 1901, of a paralytic affliction. The Bulyeas were active members of the Baptist Church.

== Political career ==
In the 1891 Northwest Territories election, he ran as an unsuccessful candidate for a seat to the Legislative Assembly of the Northwest Territories for the riding of South Qu'Appelle. He ran successfully for the same seat in 1894, and was elected in the 1894 Election. He was re-elected to the same position in 1898, and 1902 On October 7, 1897, he became a Member of the first Executive Council of the Northwest Territories which administered the affairs of the area that presently comprises Alberta, Saskatchewan, and the Yukon. He was re-elected by acclamation at a by-election on October 26, 1897. In 1898, he was appointed Special Commissioner to the Territories, serving in that capacity until the Provinces of Alberta and Saskatchewan were created in 1905. During the period 1898 to 1905, he also served as Administrator of Territorial Affairs in the Yukon for one year. He was reelected to the Northwest Territories Assembly at the 1898 Northwest Territories election and again, by acclamation, in 1902 Northwest Territories election. George H.V. Bulyea was appointed Commissioner of Agriculture and Territorial Secretary in the Haultain government on January 12, 1899, relinquishing the agriculture portfolio in February, 1903, to become Commissioner of Public Works. Along with Frederick W. A. G. Haultain, he represented the territorial government in the negotiations with Prime Minister Sir Wilfrid Laurier and the federal Cabinet on the issue of provincial status.

=== Lieutenant governor ===
On the advice of Prime Minister Sir Wilfrid Laurier, Bulyea was appointed Lieutenant Governor of Alberta effective September 1, 1905, the date that Alberta became a province. This appointment was made by Earl Grey, Governor General of Canada. During Bulyea's period of service as Lieutenant Governor his Secretaries were G. H. Babbit and A .C. Gillespie.

In 1910, Bulyea presided over the resignation of Premier A. C. Rutherford following the Alberta and Great Waterways Railway scandal. He passed over the candidates of two rival factions in the Liberal government's caucus to promote, and finally name, Alberta's Chief Justice Arthur Sifton as Rutherford's successor. This decisive action helped put matters to rest.

The Lieutenant Governor also played a sensitive role in the internal politics of the provincial Liberal Party. The dynamics of federal and provincial political parties were not as clearly delineated then as they are today. The selection of such a prominent Liberal and an active political figure for the first Lieutenant Governor suggests that Prime Minister Sir Wilfrid Laurier expected that Bulyea would play an assertive role in developing the politics of the new Province. However, the role of the Office has since evolved into a non-partisan and largely symbolic position. Bulyea was appointed Lieutenant Governor for a second term and continued to serve in that capacity until his successor was appointed effective October 20, 1915. Following his service as Lieutenant Governor, Bulyea was appointed chairman of Alberta's Board of Public Utilities on November 20, 1915.

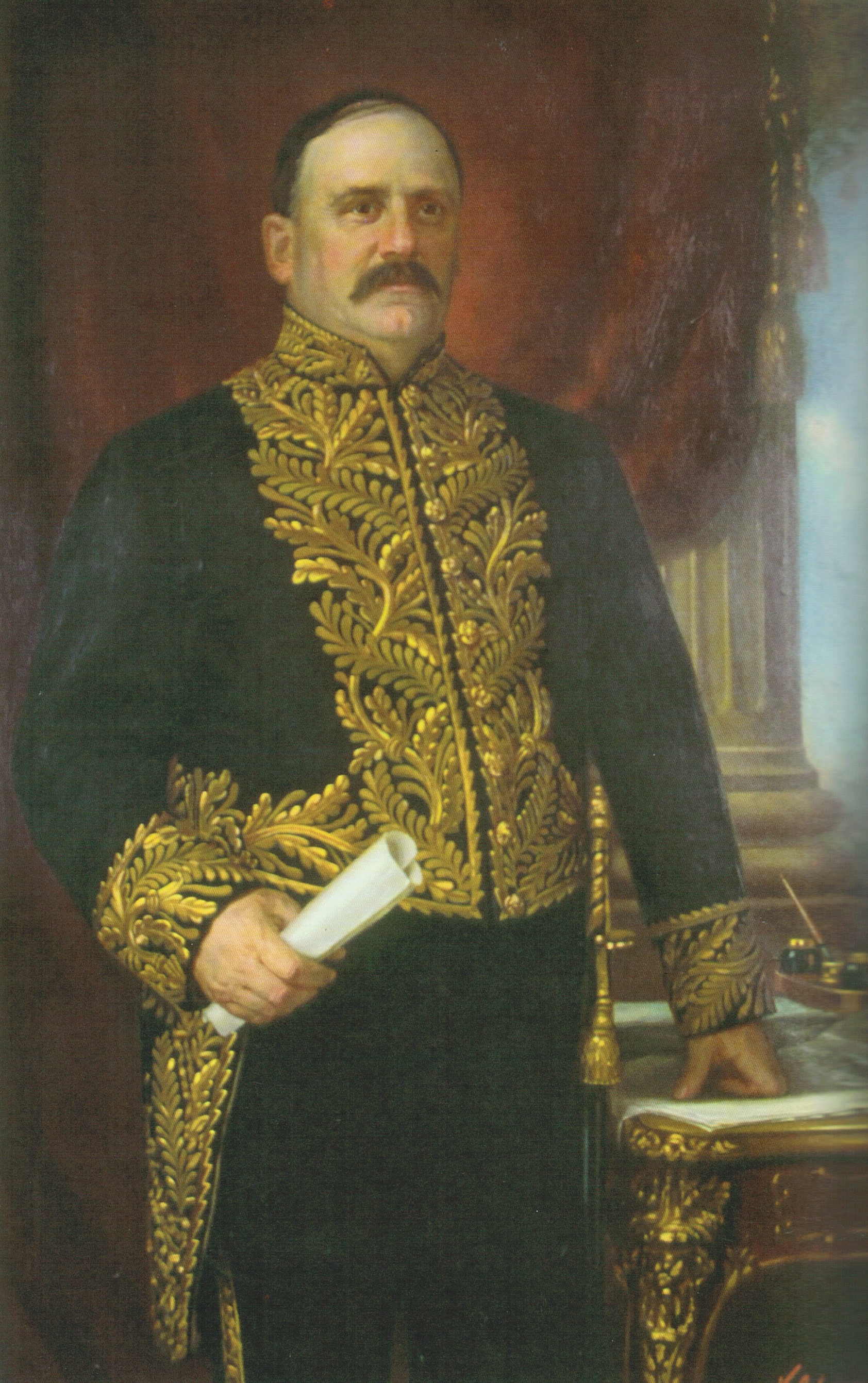
Bulyea's official Lieutenant Governor portrait, by Victor A. Long

In 1908, Bulyea received honorary Doctor of Laws degrees from the University of Alberta and the University of New Brunswick. While living in Edmonton, he was a member of the Edmonton Club and the Edmonton Golf and Country Club.

== Later life ==
After the completion of his second term as Lieutenant Governor, he was appointed the first chair of Alberta's Board of Publicity Utility Commissioners, in which he would remain until 1923, when he would resign, due to ill health. After retirement, the Bulyeas moved, and settled in Peachland, British Columbia, where they had previously resided during summers, at their four-hectare fruit orchard and summer home. He was a shareholder in the Peachland Townsite Company and was involved in negotiations for the sale of its irrigation system.

He was an active member of the Edmonton Club, and Edmonton Golf and Country Club, while living in Edmonton.

=== Death ===
Bulyea died on July 22, 1928, in Peachland, British Columbia, after a long illness. A service was held on July 24, at the United Church, in Qu'Appelle, Saskatchewan, where he was later interred in the Qu'Appelle Cemetery. His wife, Annie was interred alongside him, when she died in 1934.

== Footnotes ==
- Legislative Assembly of Alberta

^{1} Amédée E. Forget served as Lieutenant-Governor of Northwest Territories until Alberta was separated from the Territories and became a province.
