= Whitewood (electoral district) =

Former territorial electoral district in the North-West Territories, Canada

Whitewood, was a territorial electoral district in the North-West Territories of Canada from 1887 to 1905. The district was created from the former district of Broadview, prior to the 1888 general election.

This district was the first to use a secret ballot. During the 1894 By-election, ballots were first used in this electoral district. The territory went to using coloured pencils on paper to count ballots, except someone forgot the pencil for the Candidate William Clements at the Fairmede polling station, and one had to be sent out from the Chief electoral office in Regina. Fred Chamberlain, the local liveryman, drove his horse and carriage twenty-five miles through a blizzard to deliver a new pencil and arrived just before the polls opened.

After the province of Saskatchewan split from the North-West Territories in 1905, Whitewood continued to exist as a district in Saskatchewan until 1908.

== Election results ==
=== 1894 – 1902 ===
1894 North-West Territories general election
Party	Candidate	Votes	%
Independent	Archibald Beaton Gillis	300	51.64%
Independent	Walter Claude Thorburn	281	48.36%

1898 North-West Territories general election
Party	Candidate	Votes
Independent	Archibald Beaton Gillis	Acclaimed

1902 North-West Territories general election
Party	Candidate	Votes
Liberal–Conservative	Archibald Beaton Gillis	Acclaimed

=== 1888 – 1894 ===
1894 by-election Results			1891 Results			1888 Results		
Candidate	Votes	%	Candidate	Votes	%	Candidate	Votes	%
Joseph Clementson	187	?%	Daniel Campbell	197	45.92%	Alexander Thorburn	166	38.88%
James Sumner	25	?%	Alexander Thorburn	178	41.49%	Thomas Lyons	158	37.00%
Allan B. Potter	69	?%	John Hawkes	54	12.59%	John Hawkes	103	26.12%
William Clements	41	?%						

Note: Vote returns not complete for the 1894 By-election. Returns only include the polls from Whitewood and Broadview, they do not include the rural stations. As reported in the Lethbridge Herald February 22, 1894. The Broadview and Whitewood polls were announced by the returning officer on February 16, 1894, and the rural vote was announced February 17, 1894 but was not printed.

== By-election reasons ==
- February 16, 1894: Daniel Campbell's expulsion from the Council after he was accused of forgery and embezzlement, and fled the country.

== See also ==
- List of Northwest Territories territorial electoral districts
- Canadian provincial electoral districts
