= Samuel Page (politician) =

Canadian politician

1st Clerk of the Legislative Assembly of Saskatchewan
- In office February 14, 1906 – October 10, 1916
- Speaker: Thomas MacNutt; William Charles Sutherland; John Albert Sheppard
- Preceded by: new office
- Succeeded by: George Arthur Mantle

Clerk of the Legislative Assembly of the Northwest Territories
- In office March 14, 1901 – August 31, 1905
- Speaker: William Eakin; Archibald Beaton Gillis
- Preceded by: Robert Bell Gordon

Member of the Legislative Assembly of the Northwest Territories
- In office November 7, 1891 – November 4, 1898
- Succeeded by: Ewan Cameron McDiarmid
- Constituency: Cannington

Personal details
- Born: April 21, 1857 Lancaster, England
- Died: October 10, 1916 (aged 59) Regina, Saskatchewan, Canada
- Party: Independent

Samuel Spencer Page (April 21, 1857 – October 10, 1916) was a Canadian politician. He served on the Legislative Assembly of the Northwest Territories for Cannington from 1891 to 1898.

Page was born in England, the son of A. Shaw Page and Eliza Mary Civian Tunney. He attended Rossall School and immigrated to Canada in 1882. An Anglican, he married Frances Michall Pierce in November 1885. From 1906 to his death, Page served as a clerk in the Legislative Assembly of Saskatchewan. He resided in Regina.

He was elected in 1891 to the Legislative Assembly of the Northwest Territories, and was defeated in the next election, in 1898. Upon his retirement he served as a clerk for the assembly, from March 14, 1901 to August 31, 1905.

== Electoral results ==
=== 1891 election ===
November 7, 1891 election
Name	Vote	%
Samuel Page	Acclaimed	
Total Votes	n/a	n/a

=== 1894 election ===
October 31, 1894 election
Name	Vote	%
Samuel Page	237	60.00%
N. McConnachie	158	40.00%
Total Votes	150	100%

=== 1898 election ===
November 4, 1898 election
Name	Vote	%
Ewan Cameron McDiarmid	228	52.66%
Samuel Page	114	26.33%
William Hislop	91	21.02%
Total Votes	150	100%
