= Battleford (territorial electoral district) =

Former territorial electoral district in the North-West Territories, Canada

Battleford was a territorial electoral district mandated to return a single member to the Legislative Assembly of the North-West Territories. The electoral district came into existence with the passage of the North-West Representation Act in 1888 and was abolished in 1905 when Alberta and Saskatchewan were created.

== Members of the Legislative Assembly (MLAs) ==
Name	Elected	Left Office
James Clinkskill	1888	1898
Benjamin Prince	1898	1905

== Election results ==
=== 1888 election ===
1888 North-West Territories general election
Party	Candidate	Votes	%
Independent	James Clinkskill	180	53.57%
Independent	Daniel Livingstone Clink	156	46.43%
Total votes		336	
Source(s) "North-West Territories: Council and Legislative Assembly, 1876-1905" (PDF). Saskatchewan Archives. Archived from the original (PDF) on 28 September 2007.

=== 1891 election ===
1891 North-West Territories general election
Party	Candidate	Votes	%
Independent	James Clinkskill	168	55.63%
Independent	James M. Skelton	134	44.37%
Total votes		302	
Source(s) "North-West Territories: Council and Legislative Assembly, 1876-1905" (PDF). Saskatchewan Archives. Archived from the original (PDF) on 28 September 2007.

=== 1894 election ===
1894 North-West Territories general election
Party	Candidate	Votes	%
Independent	James Clinkskill	173	52.74%
Independent	Benjamin Prince	155	47.26%
Total votes		328	
Source(s) "North-West Territories: Council and Legislative Assembly, 1876-1905" (PDF). Saskatchewan Archives. Archived from the original (PDF) on 28 September 2007.

=== 1898 election ===
1898 North-West Territories general election
Party	Candidate	Votes	%
Independent	Benjamin Prince	185	58.54%
Independent	James M. Skelton	131	41.46%
Total votes		316	
Source(s) "North-West Territories: Council and Legislative Assembly, 1876-1905" (PDF). Saskatchewan Archives. Archived from the original (PDF) on 28 September 2007.

=== 1902 election ===
1902 North-West Territories general election
Party	Candidate	Votes	%
Independent	Benjamin Prince	210	51.72%
Independent	Albert E. Dunn	196	48.28%
Total votes		406}	
Source(s) "North-West Territories: Council and Legislative Assembly, 1876-1905" (PDF). Saskatchewan Archives. Archived from the original (PDF) on 28 September 2007.

== See also ==
- List of Northwest Territories territorial electoral districts
- Canadian provincial electoral districts
