= South Regina (electoral district) =

Former electoral district in the North-West Territories, Canada

South Regina was a territorial electoral district in the North-West Territories, Canada that came into existence with the passage of the North-West Representation Act of 1888 and was succeeded by a riding of the same name when Alberta and Saskatchewan were created in 1905.

== Members of the Legislative Assembly (MLAs) ==
Name	Elected	Left office
John Secord	1888	1891
Daniel Mowat	1891	1898
James Hawkes	1898	1905

== Election results ==
=== 1888 ===
1888 North-West Territories general election
Name	Vote	%
John Secord	131	52.19%
David Lynch Scott	120	47.81%
Total votes	251	100%

=== 1891 ===
1891 North-West Territories general election
Name	Vote	%
Daniel Mowat	185	50.82%
John Secord	179	49.18%
Total votes	364	100%

=== 1894 ===
1894 North-West Territories general election
Name	Vote	%
Daniel Mowat	315	57.78%
J.W. Smith	245	42.22%
Total votes	560	100%

=== 1898 ===
1898 North-West Territories general election
Name	Vote	%
James Benjamin Hawkes	273	51.03%
J.W. Smith	210	39.25%
William F. Eddy	52	9.72%
Total votes	535	100%

=== 1902 ===
1902 North-West Territories general election
Name	Vote	%
James Benjamin Hawkes	455	65.75%
J.W. Smith	237	34.25%
Total votes	692	100%

== See also ==
- List of Northwest Territories territorial electoral districts
- Canadian provincial electoral districts
- Regina South, created 1964
