= William Eakin =

Canadian politician

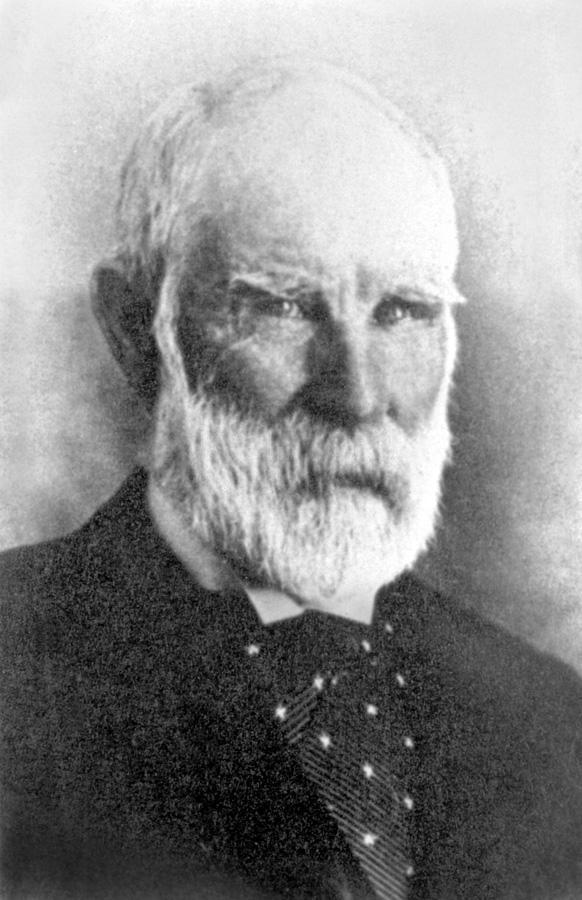

Speaker of the Legislative Assembly of the North-West Territories
- In office 1898–1902
- Preceded by: John Felton Betts
- Succeeded by: Archibald Gillis

Personal details
- Born: June 14, 1828 Markham Township, York County, Upper Canada
- Died: March 14, 1918 (aged 89) Saltcoats, Saskatchewan
- Party: Liberal
- Spouse: Margaret Hunter (m. 1853)

William Eakin (June 14, 1828 – March 14, 1918) was a farmer and political figure in the Northwest Territories, Canada. He was a member and speaker of the Legislative Assembly of the Northwest Territories.

He was born at Markham Township in 1828, the son of a wagon maker and merchant. After attending school, he joined his family business, remaining there until purchasing and starting businesses of his own: a carriage making company and later a planing mill where he made a variety of items, along with his brother. Eakin later sold his plant and moved west to homestead and farm near Crescent Lake. Here he involved himself in local affairs, eventually winning election to the Legislative Assembly of the Northwest Territories for the district of Saltcoats, serving from 1894 to 1902. His term involved negotiations with the Government of Canada for provincial status for the Northwest Territories. For the latter three years of his term, he was selected to serve as speaker of the assembly, serving until his retirement in 1902 at the age of 73. After his retirement he eventually moved to Saltcoats, where he died in 1918 at the age of 89.

== Early life, education and career ==
Eakin was born June 14, 1828 in Markham Township, York County, Upper Canada, the eldest of six children to Samuel Baxter Eakin, wagon maker, farmer and merchant and Elizabeth Pingle, of Irish and Danish descent. His brother, George served as postmaster of Unionville, Markham Township from 1864 to 1875, and was also a secretary-treasurer of the town council.

William Eakin attended school in his hometown; the schools being operated by the fathers of families in the community. Later he also took tutoring sessions to better his education. He spent his teenage years learning the trade of wagon making, in which his father was employed. He later was sent to Toronto as an apprentice, and learned how to make cabinets and carriages. He also served in the military, receiving his commission as ensign with the Unionville Company of the 12th York Battalion of Infantry in 1866 and retiring from the military in 1872. In the 1850s, he joined his father's business as a wagon maker, where he worked in the family's business. He bought a sawmill in 1854 that was later converted into a carriage manufacturing shop. In 1873, along with his brother, George, Eakin built a planing mill near a new Canadian Pacific Railway line, where they manufactured doors, sashes, wagons, carriages, agricultural implants, cabinets, furniture, and coffins. Known as the Unionville Planing Mill, it was eventually leased out in 1874 and sold in 1881.

== Early political activities ==
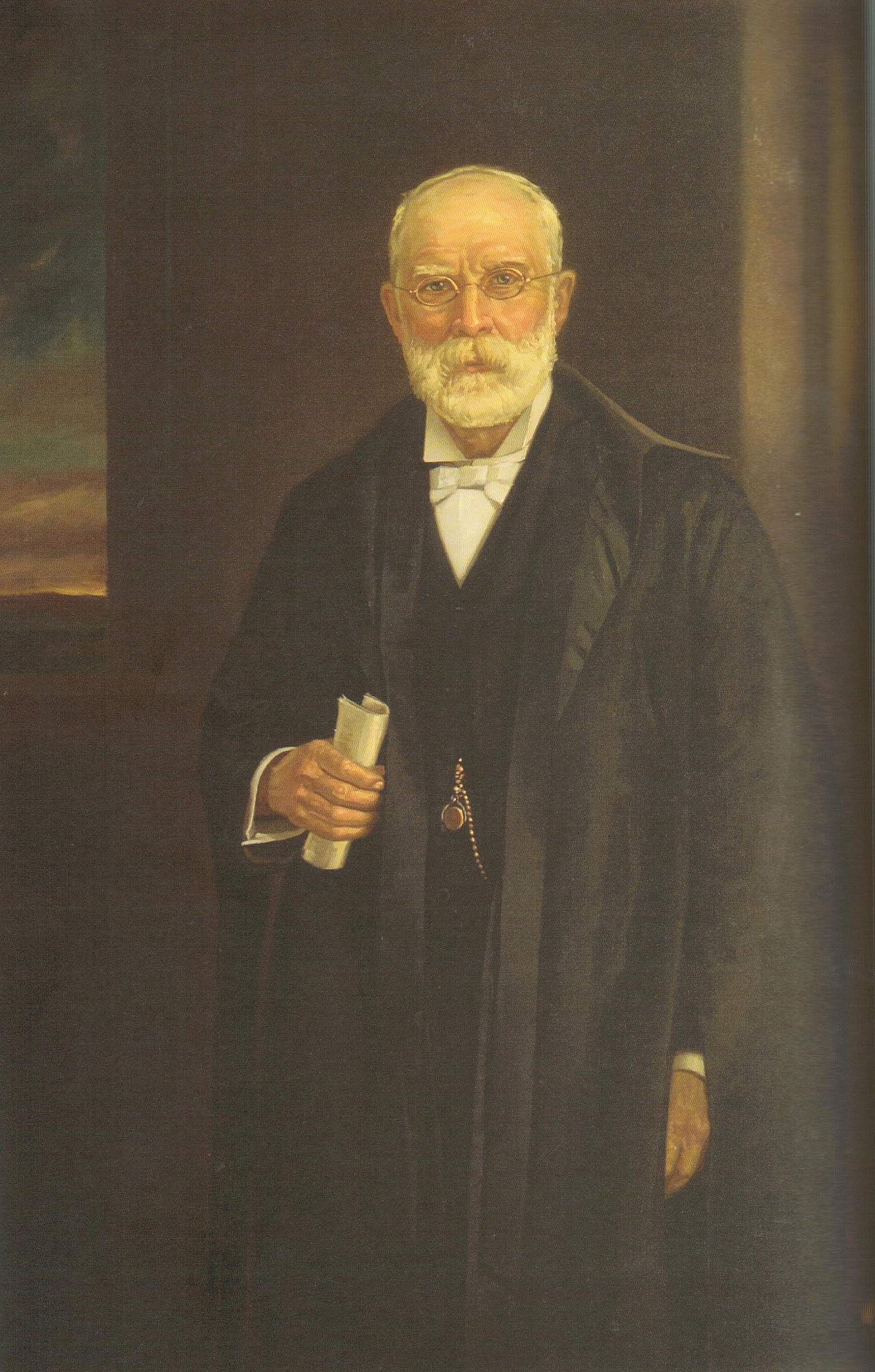
Official speaker portrait of Eakin, by V.A. Long, 1912

In addition to his manufacturing business, Eakin also served an active role in politics while he was living in Markham. He served as a councillor on the Markham Township Council on three separate occasions: 1867, 1871 and 1872, and later served as the reeve of the council in 1873 and from 1879 to February 1883, when he resigned. After spending time with the Reform Association of York, Eakin was appointed Warden of the County of York in 1881. He also served on the public works commission of that same county.

Eakin relocated to the North-West Territories in 1883; he set up homestead at Crescent Lake, near Saltcoats, Saskatchewan and worked for the Saskatchewan Land and Homestead Company. He was one of the first European settlers in the area. Two years later he was appointed as a justice of the peace, and later as a licence and affidavit commissioner. When a school system was established in the area in 1887, the Eakin residence served as one of the first classrooms, with William Eakin receiving $1 per month as rent. He later used the carpentry skills learned in his younger years to assist in building a school building as supplies became available the next year.

== Political career ==
His first attempt for public office came in 1888 when he unsuccessfully ran for the Council of the Northwest Territories. He later ran in 1894 for the new district of Saltcoats and won election to the legislative assembly of the Northwest Territories, as a Liberal. He was also reelected in 1898. During his time in office, as the issue of provincial status for the territories, drawing the borders particularly became a perennial debate. Toward this issue, Eakin was of the belief that the talks were premature, stating the belief that the citizens were content with the current situation and did not see any advantage to provincial status. He was also a proponent of the education system, giving his support in using government funds for the school systems within the territory.

In the opening of the 1899 legislative session, Eakin was nominated by premier Frederick Haultain and member Robert Brett to serve in the post as speaker. Praised by his colleagues for his fairness, even temperament and knowledge, he was elected as speaker later that session by his legislative colleagues. Assuming the office at the age of 70, the predominant issues of the session were again those of provincial status for the North-West Territory, and whether boundaries would be drawn to include one or two provinces. On one occasion was Eakin required to use his casting vote as speaker, to break a deadlock on an 1899 bill regarding land titles and offices. Eakin continued as speaker until April 26, 1902, when the assembly was dissolved. Though nominated to serve as speaker once again, Eakin opted to retire due to his health and age.

== Later life and death ==
After retiring as speaker, Eakin returned to farming at Crescent Lake. A post office was also established at the time in the area, with the name Eakindale. He continued farming until 1911, moving to Saltcoats some time after. Eakin died at this home in Saltcoats on March 14, 1918, one week after celebrating his 65th wedding anniversary with his wife. Aged 89, he was later buried at the Saltcoats Cemetery. His wife died later in the year, on September 9, 1918.

== Personal life ==
In 1853, Eakin married Margaret Hunter, daughter of Alexander and Lucy Hunter of Markham Township. Alexander Hunter was also active in Markham Township affairs, serving on the town council and as a deputy reeve in 1852. Eakin and his wife had six children; five daughters and one son, Elizabeth, Otelia, Edna, Nella, Margaret, and Gordon. In Markham Township, Eakin was a member and president of the Markham and East York Agricultural Society. In his spare time, he was an avid reader and gardener. He was one of the first members of the Saltcoats Presbyterian Church when it was founded in 1890. At church, he was active in the choir. In the early 1900s, his speaker's chair in the legislature was donated to the Saltcoats Canadian Legion by Saskatchewan Premier Thomas MacNutt.

== Bibliography ==
- Markham Historical Society (1979), Markham, 1793-1900, Markham, Ontario: Committee for the History of Markham Township, ISBN 0969090005
- Perry, Sandra E.; Footz, Valerie L. (2006), A Higher Duty : Speakers of the Legislative Assemblies of the North-West Territories and Alberta, 1888-2005, Edmonton, Alberta: Legislative Assembly of Alberta, ISBN 0-9689217-3-6
