= Medicine Hat (territorial electoral district) =

Former territorial electoral district in the North-West Territories, Canada

Coordinates: 49.9°N 110.6°W

Medicine Hat was a former territorial electoral district in North-West Territories, Canada. The electoral district was created with the passage of the North-West Representation Act of 1888. The primary population centre and the districts name sake was the city of Medicine Hat. The district was abolished in 1905 with the creation of Saskatchewan and Alberta.

== Members of the Legislative Assembly (MLAs) ==
Name	Elected	Left office
Thomas Tweed	1888	1894
Edward Fearon	1894	1898
Horace Greeley	1898	1902
William Thomas Finlay	1902	1905

== Election results ==
=== 1888 ===
1888 North-West Territories general election
Name	Vote	%
Thomas Tweed	Acclaimed	

=== 1891 ===
1891 North-West Territories general election
Name	Vote	%
Thomas Tweed	Acclaimed	

=== 1894 ===
1894 North-West Territories general election
Name	Vote	%
Edward Fearon	398	56.29%
Thomas Tweed	309	43.71%
Total votes	707	100%

=== 1898 ===
1898 North-West Territories general election
Name	Vote	%
Horace Greeley	327	36.50%
William Finlay	285	31.81%
John George Calder	284	31.69%
Total votes	896	100%

=== 1902 ===
1902 North-West Territories general election
Name	Vote	%
William Finlay	486	71.89%
Joseph A. Grant	205	28.11%
Total votes	676	100%

== See also ==
- Legislative Assembly of the Northwest Territories
- List of Northwest Territories territorial electoral districts
- Canadian provincial electoral districts
