= Kinistino (territorial electoral district) =

Former territorial electoral district in the North-West Territories, Canada

Kinistino was a former territorial electoral district in the North-West Territories, Canada. The electoral district was mandated to return a single member to the Legislative Assembly of the Northwest Territories from its creation in 1888 until it was abolished when Alberta and Saskatchewan were created in 1905. The district was created as part of the North-West Representation Act when it passed through the Parliament of Canada in 1888.

== Members of the Legislative Assembly (MLAs) ==
Name	Elected	Left office
James Hoey	1888	1891
William Frederick Meyers	1891	1905

== Election results ==
=== 1888 ===
1888 North-West Territories general election
Name	Vote	%
James Hoey	104	53.89%
John C. Slater	89	46.11%
Total votes	193	100%

=== 1891 ===
1891 North-West Territories general election
Name	Vote	%
William Frederick Meyers	32	52.46%
George Ellis	29	47.54%
Total votes	61	100%

The 1891 Kinistino election was lowest total vote held in the history of the Northwest Territories Legislature.

=== 1894 ===
1894 North-West Territories general election
Name	Vote	%
William Frederick Meyers	60	51.28%
James Tennant	57	48.72%
Total votes	117	100%

=== 1898 ===
1898 North-West Territories general election
Name	Vote	%
William Frederick Meyers	98	65.77%
Thomas Sanderson	51	34.23%
Total votes	149	100%

=== 1902 ===
1902 North-West Territories general election
Name	Vote	%
William Frederick Meyers	425	62.32%
Alfred Schmitz Shadd	257	37.68%
Total votes	682	100%

== See also ==
- List of Northwest Territories territorial electoral districts
- Canadian provincial electoral districts
