= Batoche (territorial electoral district) =

Former territorial electoral district in the North-West Territories, Canada

Batoche was a territorial electoral district in the North-West Territories that existed from 1888 to 1905.

== Members of the Legislative Assembly (MLAs) ==
Name	Elected	Left Office
Hilliard Mitchell	1888	1891
Charles Nolin	1891	1892
Charles Eugene Boucher	1892	1898
Charles Fisher	1898	1905

== Election results ==
=== 1888 election ===
1888 North-West Territories general election
Party	Candidate	Votes	%
Independent	Hilliard Mitchell	82	55.78%
Independent	James Fisher	65	44.22%
Total votes		147	
Source(s) "North-West Territories: Council and Legislative Assembly, 1876-1905" (PDF). Saskatchewan Archives. Archived from the original (PDF) on September 28, 2007.

=== 1891 election ===
1891 North-West Territories general election
Party	Candidate	Votes
Independent	Charles Nolin	n/a
Independent	Charles Eugene Boucher	n/a
Total votes		n/a
Charles Nolin was removed from his seat by judicial order after it was determined one of his agents controverted the election with corrupt practices, a by-election was held in the district on March 15, 1892.
Source(s) "North-West Territories: Council and Legislative Assembly, 1876-1905" (PDF). Saskatchewan Archives. Archived from the original (PDF) on September 28, 2007.

=== 1892 election ===
North-West Territories territorial by-election, March 15, 1892
Party	Candidate	Votes
Independent	Charles Eugene Boucher	?
Independent	?	?
Total votes		?
Source(s) Returns from Batoche. Regina Leader. March 15, 1892. p. 8.

=== 1894 election ===
1894 North-West Territories general election
Party	Candidate	Votes	%
Independent	Charles Eugene Boucher	101	57.06%
Independent	David Venne	76	42.94%
Total votes		177	
Source(s) "North-West Territories: Council and Legislative Assembly, 1876-1905" (PDF). Saskatchewan Archives. Archived from the original (PDF) on September 28, 2007.

=== 1898 election ===
1898 North-West Territories general election
Party	Candidate	Votes	%
Independent	Charles Fisher	76	58.46%
Independent	Charles Eugene Boucher	54	41.54%
Total votes		130	
Source(s) "North-West Territories: Council and Legislative Assembly, 1876-1905" (PDF). Saskatchewan Archives. Archived from the original (PDF) on September 28, 2007.

=== 1902 election ===
1902 North-West Territories general election
Party	Candidate	Votes	%
Independent	Charles Fisher	174	61.48%
Independent	Jean Baptiste Boucher	109	38.52%
Total votes		283	
Source(s) "North-West Territories: Council and Legislative Assembly, 1876-1905" (PDF). Saskatchewan Archives. Archived from the original (PDF) on September 28, 2007.

== See also ==
- List of Northwest Territories territorial electoral districts
- Canadian provincial electoral districts
