= James Dill =

Canadian politician

James Peers Dill (1859–1937) was a politician from old North-West Territories, Canada.

Dill first ran in the 1888 North-West Territories general election but was defeated by Benjamin Parkyn Richardson, with a 6-vote margin. In the 1891 North-West Territories general election Dill would face Benjamin again this time earning a substantial majority. He would serve two terms in total before retiring prior to the 1898 North-West Territories general election.

During his time in office, Dill was a vocal supporter for teaching youth in the territories English only.

Legislative Assembly of the Northwest Territories
Preceded by Benjamin Parkyn Richardson	MLA Wolseley; 1891–1898	Succeeded by William Elliott
