= Joel Reaman =

Canadian politician

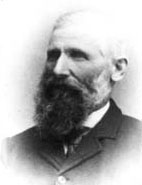

MLA for Wallace
- In office 1888–1892

Personal details
- Born: June 9, 1840 Woodbridge, Canada West
- Died: October 3, 1892 (aged 52) Regina, North-West Territory
- Spouse: Eliza Jane Franks

Joel Reaman (June 9, 1840 – October 3, 1892) was a farmer, miller and political figure in the Northwest Territories, Canada. He represented Wallace in the Legislative Assembly of the Northwest Territories from 1888 to 1892 as a Conservative.

He was born in Woodbridge, Canada West and educated there. He married Eliza J. Franks. Reaman was postmaster of Woodbridge for seven years and clerk in the division court for four years. In 1883, he moved to Yorkton, where he opened a general store and hotel. Reaman was a postmaster for Yorkton and land agent for the York Farmers Colonization Company. He died of typhoid fever in 1892.
