= Daniel Mowat =

Canadian politician

Member of the Legislative Assembly of the Northwest Territories
- In office 1891–1898
- Preceded by: John Secord
- Succeeded by: James Hawkes
- Constituency: South Regina

Mayor of Regina
- In office 1886–1887
- Preceded by: David Lynch Scott
- Succeeded by: W. Cayley Hamilton

Personal details
- Born: May 9, 1848
- Died: September 19, 1923 (aged 75)
- Occupation: Rancher

Daniel Alexander Mowat (May 9, 1848 – September 19, 1923 ) was a merchant and political figure in Saskatchewan (then the Northwest Territories), Canada. He represented South Regina in the Legislative Assembly of the Northwest Territories from 1891 to 1898 as a Conservative.

He was born in Ottawa, Canada West, the son of Alex Mowat, of Scottish descent. In 1871, he married Amelia M. Hoy. Mowat was a member of the Ottawa public school board. He came to the Northwest Territories in 1880 and opened the first store in Regina in 1882. Mowat served on the Regina town council and was mayor from 1886 to 1887. With his brother Alex, also a partner in the Regina store, Mowat owned a large horse ranch near the current village of Avonlea.

While a member of the assembly, Mowat proposed that English be the sole language of instruction in schools in the Northwest Territories. A compromise was reached that allowed a course in French at the primary level.

He moved to British Columbia and so retired from territorial politics in the 1890s. He died in Burnaby, British Columbia, and was buried in Ocean View Burial Park, Burnaby.
