= George Knowling =

Canadian politician

Member of the Legislative Assembly of the Northwest Territories for Souris
- In office November 1891 – November 1898
- Succeeded by: John Wesley Connell

Personal details
- Born: March 23, 1855 Brooklin, Canada West
- Died: 1923 (aged 66–67)
- Party: Independent

George Henry Knowling (March 23, 1856 – 1923) was a Canadian politician. He served on the Legislative Assembly of the Northwest Territories for Souris from 1891 to 1898.

Knowling was born in Brooklin, Canada West, and was educated nearby in Whitby. A lumber merchant, he was a member of the Church of England, and Conservative Party.

He was acclaimed in 1891 to the Legislative Assembly of the Northwest Territories, and served until his retirement at the 1898 election.

== Electoral results ==
=== 1891 election ===
November 7, 1891, election
Name	Vote	%
George Knowling	Acclaimed	
Total Votes	n/a	n/a

=== 1894 election ===
October 31, 1894, election
Name	Vote	%
George Knowling	Acclaimed	
Total Votes	n/a	n/a
