= Hilliard Mitchell =

Canadian politician

Hillyard Mitchell
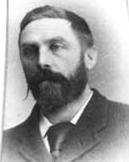

MLA for Batoche
- In office 1888–1891
- Succeeded by: Charles Nolin

MLA for Mitchell
- In office 1891–1898
- Succeeded by: Joseph McIntyre

Personal details
- Born: September 16, 1852 England
- Died: March 2, 1923 (aged 70) Victoria, British Columbia

Hilliard "Hillyard" Mitchell (September 16, 1852 – March 2, 1923) was a politician from the Canadian prairies.

Hillyard was elected to the Legislative Assembly of Northwest Territories in the 1888 Northwest Territories general election. He beat opponent James Fisher 82 to 65 in a hotly contested vote to become the first member from the Batoche electoral district.

In the 1891 Northwest Territories general election James ran for a second term, this time switching to the new Mitchell electoral district. Hillyard was acclaimed in this election and acclaimed twice more until his retirement from the legislature in 1898.

Legislative Assembly of the Northwest Territories
New district	Member of the Legislative Assembly for Batoche; 1888–1891	Succeeded by Charles Nolin
New district	Member of the Legislative Assembly for Mitchell; 1891–1898	Succeeded by Joseph McIntyre
