= Thomas Tweed (politician) =

Canadian politician

Thomas A. Tweed
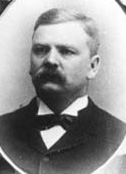

MLA for Medicine Hat
- In office 1888–1894
- Succeeded by: Edward Fearon

Personal details
- Born: April 14, 1853 Kingston, Canada West
- Died: April 4, 1906 (aged 52) Montreal, Quebec

Thomas Andrew Tweed (April 14, 1853 – April 4, 1906) was a merchant and political figure in the Northwest Territories, Canada. He represented Medicine Hat in the Legislative Assembly of the Northwest Territories from 1888 to 1894 as a Conservative.

He was born in Kingston, Canada West, the son of Thomas Tweed and Jane Hiditch, and was educated there. He served in the Red River Expedition of 1870 with Garnet Wolseley. Tweed was employed in cotton mills in Montreal and Cornwall, Ontario, reaching the position of manager. In 1873, he married Helen Sutherland. He went west to Medicine Hat in 1883, where he established a general store in partnership with James Alexander Lougheed. He later established a large ranch in partnership with John Ewart. Tweed served as postmaster for Medicine Hat. He was also president of the Medicine Hat Board of Trade.

He served as president of the Northwest Territories Liberal-Conservative Party from 1903 to 1905.

Tweed died in Montreal of heart failure at the age of 5 in 1906.

1891 Canadian federal election: Assiniboia West
Party	Candidate	Votes	%	±%
Conservative	Nicholas Flood Davin	1,011	59.65	–3.54
Conservative	Thomas Tweed	684	40.35	–
Total valid votes		1,695	100.00	
Total rejected ballots		unknown		
Turnout		1,695	68.24	+7.29
Eligible voters		2,484		
Conservative hold		Swing		–3.54
Source: Library of Parliament
