= John Ryerson Neff =

Canadian politician (1844–1913)

John Ryerson Neff (December 14, 1844 – November 14, 1913) was a farmer and political figure in the Northwest Territories, Canada. He represented Moosomin in the Legislative Assembly of the Northwest Territories from 1888 to 1898.

He was born in Troy, Wentworth County, Canada West. Neff served on the municipal council for Wentworth County. He came to Moosomin in 1882. He served four years as a member of the Executive Council for the Northwest Territories.
