= John Felton Betts =

Canadian politician

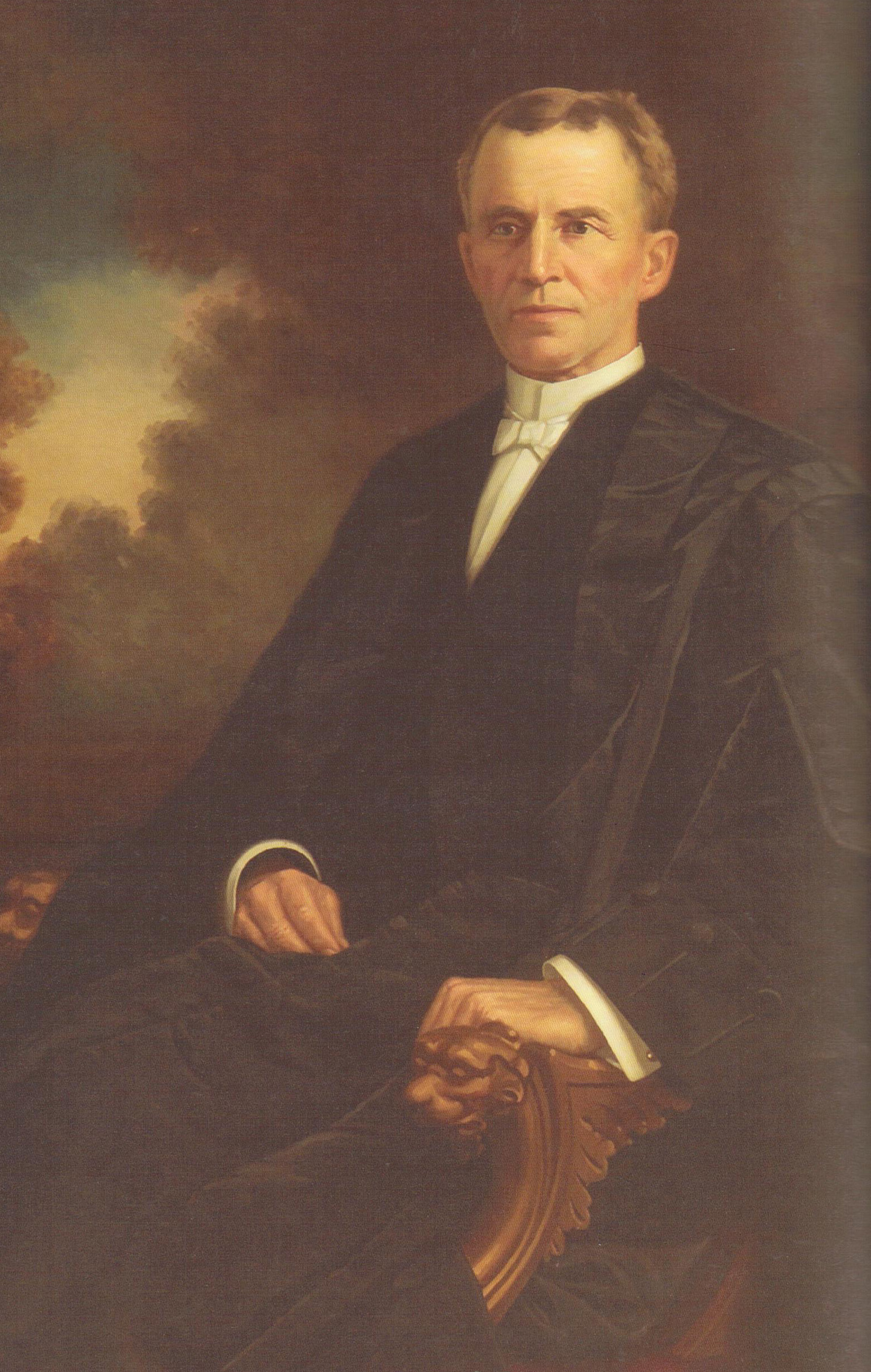

Speaker of the Legislative Assembly of the North-West Territories
- In office 1894–1898
- Preceded by: James Hamilton Ross
- Succeeded by: William Eakin

Personal details
- Born: October 9, 1854 Frankford, Canada West
- Died: May 9, 1914 (aged 59) Prince Albert, Saskatchewan

John Felton Betts (October 9, 1854 – May 9, 1914) was a merchant and political figure in the Northwest Territories, Canada. He represented Prince Albert and then Cumberland in the Legislative Assembly of the Northwest Territories from 1888 to 1898.

He was born in Canada West, the son of the Reverend Lorenzo A. Betts, and was educated at Albert College in Belleville. In 1882, he married Mary E. Boyle. Betts settled in Prince Albert in 1879, where he was the first person to erect a building on the townsite. He was justice of the peace and chairman of the school board. Betts also served as acting mayor of Prince Albert for nine years. He was Speaker of the Legislative Assembly of the Northwest Territories from 1894 to 1898.

Outside of government, John Betts was a member of the freemasons of Saskatchewan.

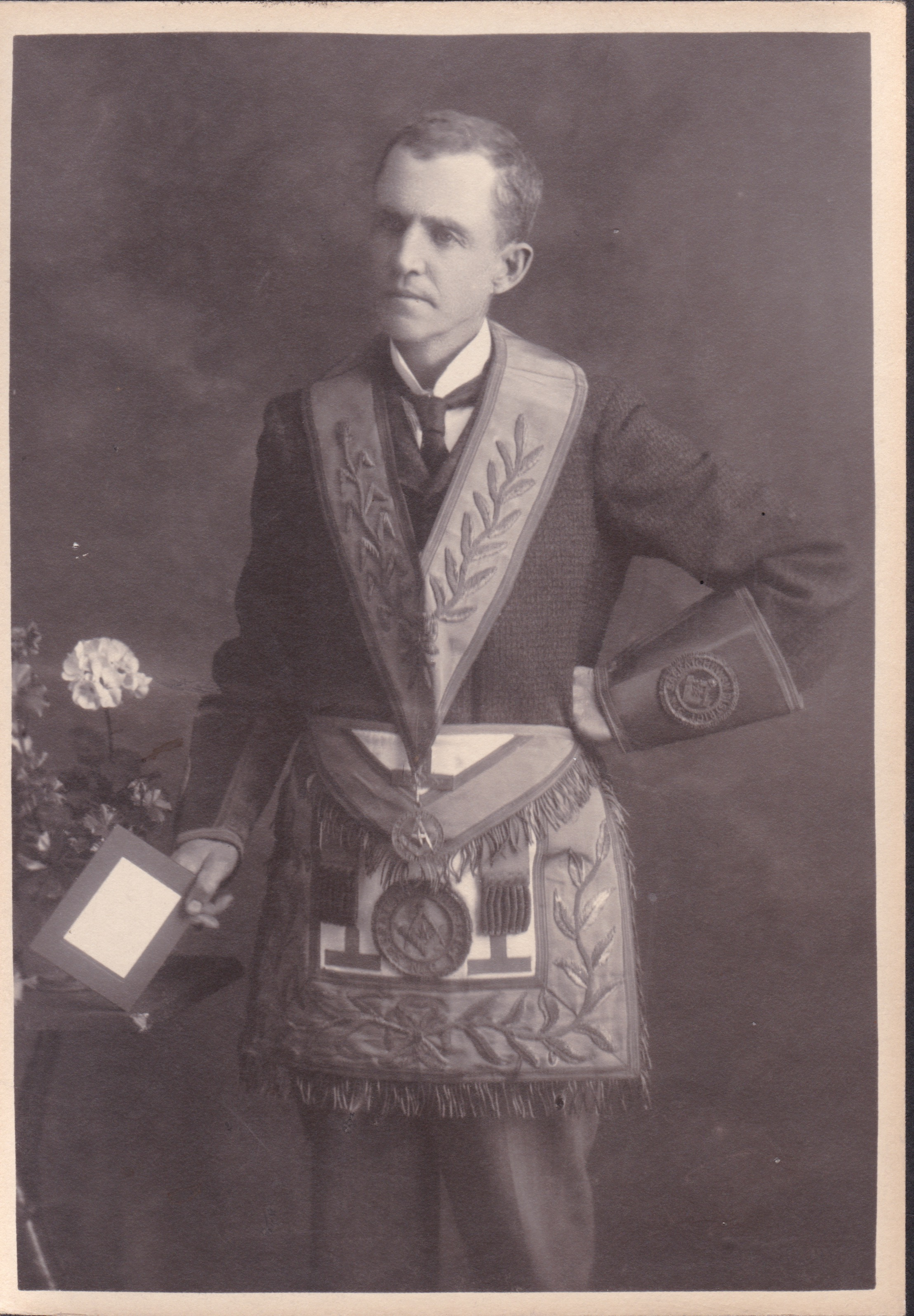

== Bibliography ==
- Gemmill, J.A., ed. (1891). The Canadian Parliamentary Companion. Ottawa: J. Durie & Son. p. 404.
- Perry, Sandra E.; Footz, Valerie L. (2006). A Higher Duty : Speakers of the Legislative Assemblies of the North-West Territories and Alberta, 1888-2005. Edmonton, Alberta: Legislative Assembly of Alberta. ISBN 0-9689217-3-6.
