= GWG =

GWG is a three letter acronym that can stand for:

- Girls with guns
- Game-winning goal, in sports
- Global warming gases (greenhouse gases)
- Geometry Wars: Galaxies, a 2007 shoot 'em up video game

== Organizations ==
- Goodwill Games (Olympic style games started during the Cold War)
- The former Garden Writers' Guild (renamed the Garden Media Guild in late 2007), a British trade association for garden writers, photographers and broadcasters
- Great Western Garment Co.
