= McCuaig =

McCuaig is a surname. Notable people with the surname include:

- Bradley McCuaig (born 1970), Canadian sprinter
- Duncan Fletcher McCuaig (1889–1950), Canadian politician
- Duncan John McCuaig (1882–1960), Canadian politician
- James Simeon McCuaig (1819–1888), Canadian politician
- Ronald McCuaig (1908–1993), Australian poet
- Scott McCuaig (born 1984), Canadian football player
- Stanley Harwood McCuaig (1891–1986), Canadian lawyer

== See also ==
- Marg McCuaig-Boyd (born 1952), Canadian politician
