= Victor Albert Long =

Canadian artist (1866–1938)

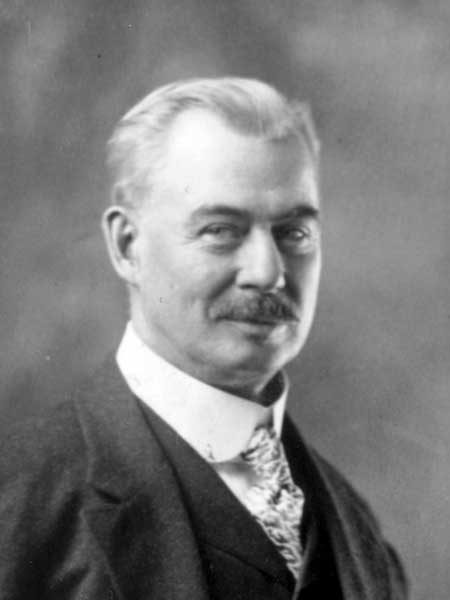
- Born: May 24, 1866; Fort Erie, Canada West
- Died: December 18, 1938 (aged 72); Vancouver, British Columbia
- Spouse: Alexandra Hughes (m. 1902)

Victor Albert Long (May 24, 1866 – December 18, 1938) was a Canadian artist specializing in portraits of politicians and community leaders. His works hang in universities, in city halls, in provincial legislatures and in Canada's Parliament Buildings.

== Life ==
Victor Long was born on May 24, 1866, in Fort Erie, Canada West. The family lived in Port Dalhousie at the time of the 1871 census. He had two older half-brothers and two younger sisters and a brother. Long's father left the family when Victor was thirteen, and he himself left home shortly after that, in 1880 or 1881, for a job working on the Welland Canal.

It is unknown how long he remained in Ontario or what he did until opening his Winnipeg studio.

In 1902, he married Alexandra Hughes, who had a young daughter. The Longs' son was born in 1904. The family relocated to Vancouver five years later.

Long was living apart from his wife for a few months prior to his dying from carbon monoxide poisoning on December 18, 1938. A police investigation determined his death to be accidental.

== Training ==
Where and how Long learned his craft is unconfirmed. Newspaper stories are conflicting and cannot all be factual; there is too much for him to have done in too short a time. In the years before setting up a studio in Winnipeg in 1887, Long is reported to have "studied art on this continent until he reached the age of 20" (1886) at which time he was "sent to Munich." He was said to have gone to England to study under Edwin Long, R.A. before spending two years in Paris. An item on the occasion of his 62nd birthday noted he had been educated at Trinity College Dublin, studied painting in Munich and "travelled over practically the whole world." His death notice stated he took a short course in New York, spent four years studying in Munich, then went on to study in Italy and in Paris, where he was at the Beaux Arts and the Julian School studying under Edouard Cabane, Jean-Léon Gérôme, and Tony Robert-Fleury.

== Career ==
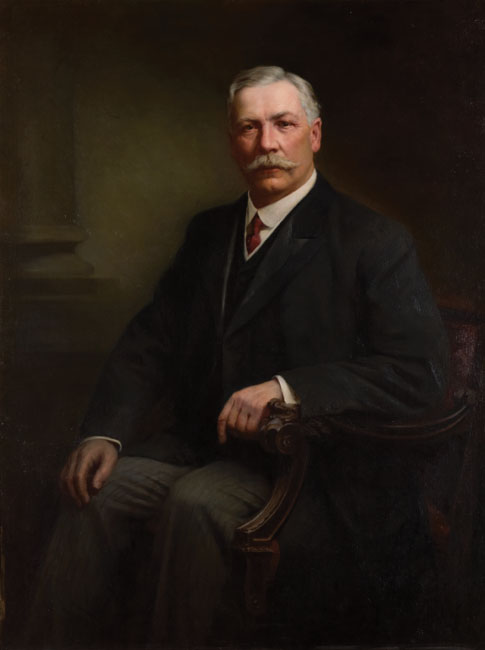
Alexander Rutherford by V.A. Long

Long was an expert portraitist. He painted from life or from photographs, helpful when the subject had passed on.

Based in Winnipeg for the first two decades of his career, his conservative, true-to-life style appealed to the institutions whose members he painted, the city halls, legislatures, court houses and universities. In 1901 he was engaged by the Winnipeg city council to paint portraits of the city's deceased mayors, at $75 each. He treated some of his subjects several times, knowing that he could sell a portrait of the king to a patriotic city council.

He was commended frequently in the Winnipeg newspapers when a painting was unveiled to the public: "The magnificent painting of the late Chief Justice Wallbridge, recently hung before the bench, was painted by that talented artist, Mr. V.A. Long." or "A magnificent oil painting of Col. Scott, collector of customs, is on view in the window of Scott & Leslie's. It is the work of Mr. V.A. Long, and it is much admired." or "Those who take pride in the achievements of local men will find in the latest effort of Mr. Victor A. Long something so far above the ordinary that it cannot fail to gratify them, as it will commend the admiration of the most critical, while it places Winnipeg's young artist in the rank of master of his art."

Long was a favourite of the Winnipeg press in the 1890s, and by 1900 his fame had spread as far west as the Pacific. In a notice of some oils to be auctioned in Victoria, his qualifications were described, "During the last ten years he has painted most of the portraits required on public occasions for the public bodies of Eastern Canada and has perhaps executed more commissions of that nature than any other Canadian artist."

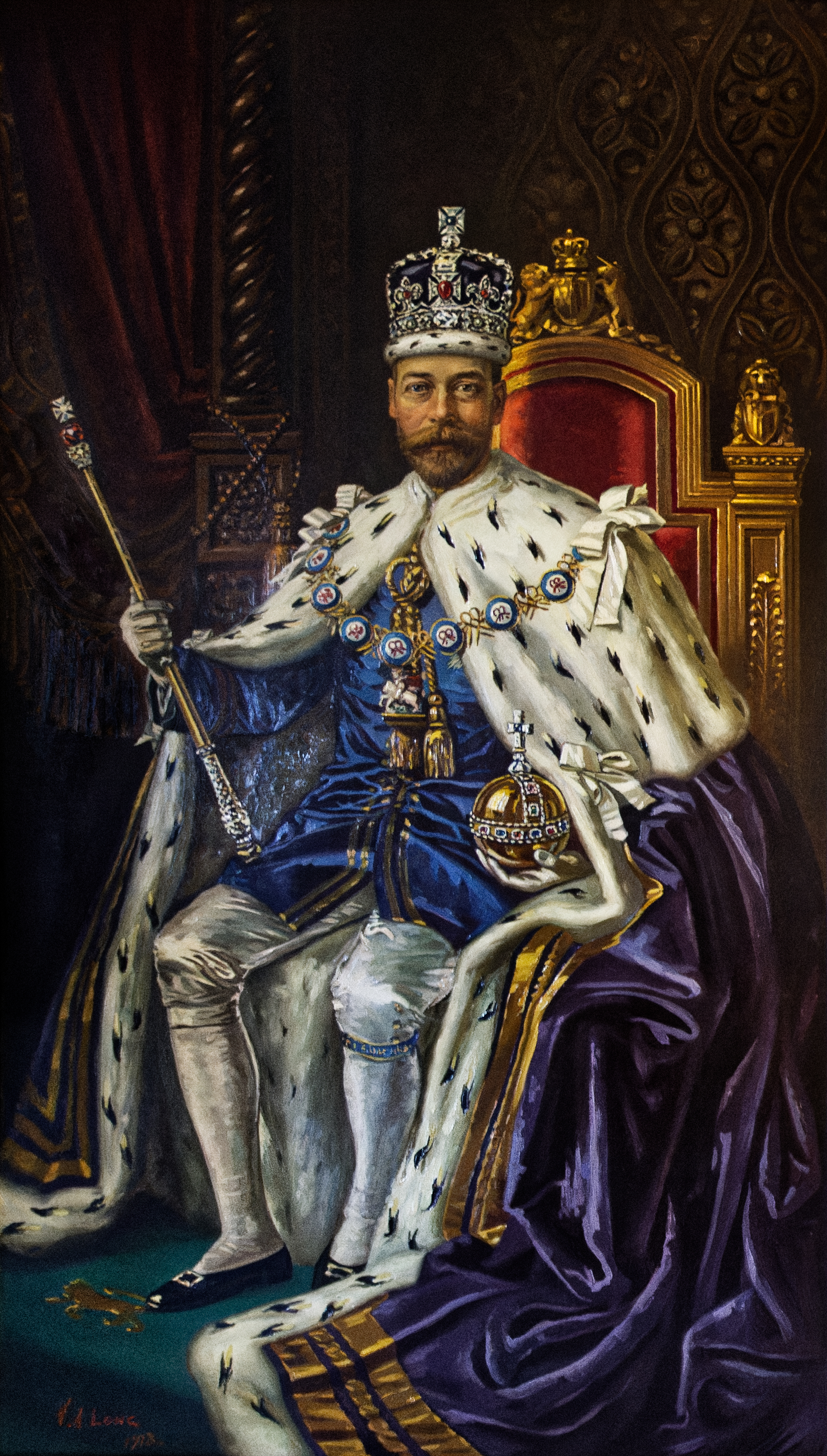
Long's portrait of George V, on display at the Alberta Legislature Building

He made several journeys back and forth across the Prairies, gaining commissions and delivering paintings. This would be his modus operandi even after making a permanent move to Vancouver in 1909, where he opened a studio in the Court House Block at 812 Robson Street. In 1912, he was commissioned to copy his Winnipeg portraits of King George and Queen Mary, for a fee of $1,000 each.

He lived in Vancouver's West End until establishing both a home and a studio in a house at 1236 West 12th Avenue, large enough for Mrs. Long to host teas and receptions where new paintings could be viewed.

Long was elected to the British Columbia Society of Fine Arts in 1921.

More than 200 of his paintings are documented in collections or mentioned in newspaper stories.

== Group exhibitions ==
- British Columbia Society of Fine Arts 13th Annual Exhibition, Vancouver, September 19 – 24, 1921
- Pacific National Exhibition, Vancouver, August 9 – 16, 1924
- Vancouver Art Gallery All Canadian Exhibition, May – July, 1932
- Vancouver Art Gallery 3rd Annual British Columbia Artists Exhibition, September 21 – October 14, 1934
- Vancouver Art Gallery Jubilee Exhibition, July 2 – 28, 1946

== 1933 solo exhibition ==
For ten days in November 1933, the Vancouver Art Gallery mounted an exhibition of Long's work. Many of the forty paintings were portraits of Vancouver business leaders, their wives, or children. Also included were Col. George Henry Ham (1926), Father Albert Lacombe (c 1926), Lily Alice Lefevre, William Curtis Shelly and a dozen landscapes and genre paintings.

== Portraits in Ontario ==
- Sir John A. Macdonald (c. 1896), in St. Peter's High School, Peterborough
- Sir Charles Tupper (1896), in the House of Commons, Ottawa

== Portraits in Manitoba ==
Most of Long's portraits of public figures are found in Manitoba, where he began his career.

In the collection of the Musée de Saint-Boniface are portraits of twenty mayors painted between 1902 and 1922, as well as King Edward VII and Queen Alexandra.

In the Manitoba Legislative Building are thirty-seven portraits painted between 1887 and 1917, including King Edward VII, King George V, Queen Mary, and Queen Victoria. Many are listed on the website of the Manitoba Historical Society.

Notable portraits in other collections:

- Prince Albert (c 1900), in the Archives of Manitoba
- Andrew Carnegie (1905), in the Winnipeg Millennium Library
- Lewis Wallbridge (c 1890), in the Winnipeg Law Courts Building

== Portraits in Saskatchewan ==
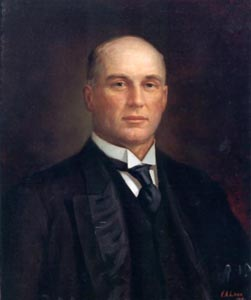
Charles Stewart in 1916 painting by V.A. Long

- Thomas Copland (before 1910), in the collection of the University of Saskatchewan, Saskatoon
- Angus MacKay (1911), in the collection of the University of Saskatchewan, Saskatoon
- Charles Rouleau
- Herbert Charles Wilson (1912), in the Saskatchewan Legislative Building

== Portraits in Alberta ==
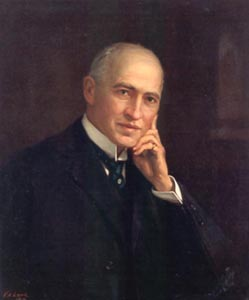
Arthur Sifton in 1915 painting by V.A. Long

The Provincial Art Collection holds twenty-one portraits made between 1895 and 1920 including two each of King George V and Queen Mary. The complete list of subjects is available on their website.

In the Alberta Legislature Building are found ten portraits made between 1911 and 1916: John Felton Betts, William Eakin, Charles W. Fisher, Archibald Beaton Gillis, Frederick W.A.G. Haultain, 1st premier of the Northwest Territories, Charles Pingle, Alexander Cameron Rutherford, 1st premier of Alberta, Arthur Lewis Watkins Sifton (1915), Charles Stewart, and Herbert Charles Wilson. A copy of Long's portrait of Rutherford also hangs in the library of Rutherford's home, Rutherford House.

In other collections:

- George Murdoch (1909), in the Calgary city hall
- Horace Harvey (1910), chief justice of Alberta (1910), in the Edmonton Supreme Court
- Father Albert Lacombe (1916), in St. Albert Parish Church, Calgary
- Alexander Cameron Rutherford (c 1911), in the University of Alberta Rutherford Library
- William Charles Gordon Armstrong (1914), in the possession of The Calgary Highlanders (10th Canadians).

== Portraits in British Columbia ==
Among named portraits in private and public collections are many painted later in Long's career. The Vancouver Archives holds Joseph Dixon (1927) and Walter Cameron Nichol (1929). In the British Columbia Archives are James Dunsmuir (1920), Richard McBride and John Oliver (1927).
