= Order of Royal Purple =

Canadian women's fraternal group (1914–2014)

- OORP
- Order of Royal Purple badge
- Founded: September 1914; 112 years ago Vancouver, British Columbia, Canada
- Type: Fraternal order auxiliary
- Affiliation: Elks of Canada
- Status: Defunct
- Defunct date: 2014
- Scope: National
- Motto: "Life sweeter, women better, and the world happier"
- Pillars: Justice, Charity, Sisterly Love, and Fidelity
- Colors: Purple, White and Gold
- Flower: Pansy
- Publication: Pansy Express
- Philanthropy: Elks and Royal Purple Fund for Children
- Chapters: 376+
- Members: 5,000 lifetime
- Headquarters: Regina, Saskatchewan; Canada

The Supreme Executive Order of Royal Purple (OORP) was a Canadian fraternal and charitable organization for women. It was the official female auxiliary of the Elks of Canada. It was also called the Royal Purple of Canada and the Order of Royal Purple. The order ended its affiliation with the Elks in 2014 and became a new organization, the Canadian Royal Purple Society.

== History ==
In 1913, some women whose husbands were members of the Elks of Canada formed an informal group to help the men with charity work. It was an officially recognized female auxiliary of the Elks of Canada in 1914 as the Order of Royal Purple. The Order of Royal Purple was a fraternal and charitable organization for women founded in Vancouver, British Columbia in September 1914. In 2013, the order had 190 active lodges with 5,000 members. Its national charity was the Elks and Royal Purple Fund for Children.

In 2014, the Supreme Executive of the Order of Royal Purple decided to secede from the Elks and start a new organization, the Canadian Royal Purple Society. The new group was incorporated on May 25, 2014 and is open to men and women. Approximately 75 of Canadian Royal Purple lodges were formed between August 2014 and February 2015.

Some local lodges did not withdraw and were integrated into the Elks of Canada as Royal Purple Elks Lodges.

== Symbols and rituals ==
The Order of Royal Purple's motto was "Life sweeter, women better, and the world happier". Its principles or pillars were Justice, Charity, Sisterly Love and Fidelity. Its crest was, a diamond that had an elk's head in the center; below the elk was a clock face pointing to 11 o'clock, a pansy, and a banner with the word "Canada".

The Order of Royal Purple's badge featured its crest in purple enamel, surrounded by a gold frame and topped with gold leaves. It could be worn alone or attached to hang from a lodge pin. The lodge pin was rectangular and was inscribed with "Lodge No xx", with a maple leaf on either side.

The order's flower was the pansy. The pansy was selected because it was found throughout Canada and symbolizes "pleasant thoughts". The order's publication was Pansy Express. Following the Elks of Canada, its colors were purple, white, and gold.

Members wore pillbox hats with tassels in various colors depending on status. A white tassel indicated a lodge member. White and purple mixed was worn by a local president, called an honored royal lady. District deputies wore gold tassels. The national leader, called the Supreme Honored Royal Lady, wore a purple tassel.

The order's fraternal signs were not allowed in a lodge until the Bible was open or after it was closed. The order had passwords and formal dress regalia. During the initiation rite, the candidate was asked to promise "never to divulge any of the secrets of the order to anyone." The candidate also had to promise "to defend every worthy member's reputation, never to wrong a member and always help a member in need". This obligation followed a prayer by the lodge chaplain and the singing of "In Charity's Sweet Name".

== Organization ==
Local units of the order were called lodges and the national structure was called the Supreme Lodge. In 1979, their national office was located in Brandon, Manitoba. Its last national office was located at #200 - 2629 - 29th Avenue in Regina, Saskatchewan.

== Membership ==
In 1979, membership was open to women who believed in a Supreme Being, were 18 years or older, and a male relative in the Elks of Canada. Women who did not have a male relative who was an Elk could also be admitted, but could not make up more than 25% of a lodge. Members were accepted or rejected by a black cube system, with three black cubes being sufficient to reject a candidate for membership.

However, membership requirements at the time of the dissolution of the organization were: fourteen years of age, a resident of Canada, supporting democratic and lawful government, and the purpose and objectives of the Order. The order also awarded honorary membership to non-members who made contributions to the lodge.

== Chapters ==
Following is an incomplete list of chapters or lodges of the Order of Royal Purple.

Number	Charter date	Lodge	Location	Status	Ref.
14		Thunder Bay Royal Purple Lodge No. 14	Thunder Bay, Ontario	Inactive	
21		Red Deer Royal Purple Lodge No. 21	Red Deer, Alberta	Inactive	
22		Edmonton Royal Purple Lodge No. 22	Edmonton, Alberta	Inactive	
27		Ponoka Royal Purple Lodge No. 27	Ponoka, Alberta	Inactive	
32	April 27, 1928 – 2017	Lethbridge Royal Purple Lodge No. 32	Lethbridge, Alberta	Withdrew	(Note: Became the Lethbridge Royal Purple Elk Lodge No. 32.)
50		Prince Albert Royal Purple Lodge No. 50	Prince Albert, Saskatchewan	Withdrew	(Note: Became the Prince Albert Royal Purple Elks Lodge No. 50.)
57		Hodgeville Royal Purple Lodge No. 57	Hodgeville, Saskatchewan	Withdrew	(Note: Became the Hodgeville Royal Purple Elks Lodge No. 57.)
67		Nipawin Royal Purple Lodge No. 67	Nipawin, Saskatchewan	Withdrew	(Note: Became the Nipawin Royal Purple Elks Lodge No. 67.)
71		Trochu Royal Purple Lodge No. 71	Trochu, Alberta	Inactive	
74	December 13, 1941	Estevan Royal Purple Lodge No. 74	Estevan, Saskatchewan	Inactive	
77		Big Valley Royal Purple Lodge No. 77	Big Valley, Alberta	Inactive	
80		Grimshaw Royal Purple Lodge No. 80	Grimshaw, Alberta	Inactive	
88	June 7, 1945 – mid 2000s	Pas Royal Purple Lodge No 88	The Pas, Manitoba	Inactive	
99		Stavely Royal Purple Lodge No. 99	Stavely, Alberta	Withdrew	(Note: Became the Stavely Royal Purple Elks Lodge #99.)
103		Acme Royal Purple Lodge No.103	Acme, Alberta	Inactive	
114		Canwood Royal Purple Lodge No.114	Canwood, Saskatchewan	Withdrew	(Note: Became the Canwood Royal Purple Elks Lodge No. 114.)
156		Hardisty Royal Purple No. 156	Hardisty, Alberta	Withdrew	(Note: Became the Acme Royal Purple Elks Lodge #103)
159		Crowsnest Pass Royal Purple Lodge No. 159	Crownsnest, Alberta	Inactive	
185	September 10, 1954	Swan River Royal Purple Lodge No. 185	Swan River, Manitoba	Inactive	
186		Indian Head Royal Purple Lodge No. 186	Indian Head, Saskatchewan	Withdrew	(Note: Became the Indian Head Royal Purple Elks Lodge No. 186.)
191		Sundre Royal Purple Lodge No. 191	Sundre, Alberta	Inactive	
196	March 18, 1956 – January 2022	Drayton Valley Royal Purple Lodge No. 196	Drayton Valley, Alberta	Inactive	
206		Medicine Hat Royal Purple Lodge No. 206	Medicine Hat, Alberta	Inactive	
233		Benalto Royal Purple Lodge No. 233	Benalto, Alberta	Inactive	
248		Trenville Royal Purple Lodge No. 248	Elnora, Alberta	Inactive	
258		Hanna Royal Purple Lodge No. 258	Hanna, Alberta	Inactive	
266		Sexsmith Lodge No. 266	Sexsmith, Alberta	Inactive	
277		North Kamloops Royal Purple Lodge No. 277	North Kamloops, British Columbia	Inactive	
285		Breton Royal Purple Lodge No. 285	Breton, Alberta	Inactive	
287		Sherwood Park Royal Purple Lodge No. 287	Sherwood Park, Alberta	Inactive	
304		Delia Royal Purple Lodge No. 304	Delia, Alberta	Inactive	
315		Carberry Royal Purple Lodge No. 315	Carberry, Manitoba	Inactive	
317		Didsbury Royal Purple Lodge No. 317	Didsbury, Alberta	Inactive	
361		Crossfield Royal Purple Lodge No. 261	Crossfield, Alberta	Inactive	
376	1998	River City Royal Purple Lodge No. 376	Saskatoon, Saskatchewan	Inactive	

== See also ==
- Emblem Club
- Daughters of the Improved Benevolent and Protective Order of Elks of the World
