= Mount Rutherford =

Mountain in the country of Canada

- Location within Alberta

Highest point
- Elevation: 2,847 m (9,341 ft)
- Prominence: 393 m (1,289 ft)
- Listing: Mountains of Alberta
- Coordinates: 53°10′20″N 118°24′51″W

Geography
- Location: Alberta, Canada
- Parent range: Canadian Rockies, Northern Front Ranges
- Topo map: NTS 83E1 Snaring River

Mount Rutherford is a mountain in Jasper National Park in Alberta, Canada. It is part of the Northern Front Ranges of the Canadian Rockies. Its peak stands 3 km (2 mi) east of Harvey Lake and north of the Snaring River, a tributary of the Athabasca River.

In 1954, the Geographic Board of Alberta named the 2,847 m (9,341 ft) peak Mount Rutherford after Alberta's first premier, Alexander Cameron Rutherford. It is about 34 kilometers northwest of the town of Jasper.

== See also ==
- Geography of Alberta
