= Northern Alberta Railways =

Railway in Alberta and British Columbia, Canada

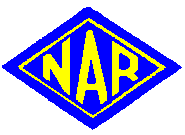

Overview
- Parent company: Canadian National Railway and Canadian Pacific Railway (jointly)
- Headquarters: Edmonton, Alberta
- Reporting mark: NAR
- Locale: Alberta, British Columbia
- Dates of operation: 1929–1981
- Predecessor: See #Predecessor railways
- Successor: Canadian National Railway

Technical
- Track gauge: 4 ft 8 1/2 in (1,435 mm) standard gauge

Northern Alberta Railways (reporting mark NAR) was a Canadian railway which served northern Alberta and northeastern British Columbia. Jointly owned by both Canadian National Railway and Canadian Pacific Railway, NAR existed as a separate company from 1929 until 1981.

== Predecessor railways ==
Railway construction in northern Alberta during the early 20th century was dominated by the Grand Trunk Pacific Railway and the Canadian Northern Railway, both of which were building westward from Edmonton, Alberta, to the Yellowhead Pass of the Rocky Mountains.

Following the Dominion Land Survey grants to settlers, the Peace River region of northwestern Alberta was one of the few places left on the prairies with available agricultural land; however, there was no railway connection.

Several lines were chartered to serve both the Peace River and Waterways regions of the province, beginning with the Athabaska Railway in 1907. It was to build northwest from Edmonton to Dunvegan, Alberta, then to Fort George, British Columbia.

=== Edmonton, Dunvegan and British Columbia Railway ===
The company was rechartered in 1911 under the ownership of J.D. McArthur as the Edmonton, Dunvegan and British Columbia Railway (ED&BC). Construction of the ED&BC started in 1912 heading toward Westlock, Alberta, reaching High Prairie in 1914, and Spirit River in 1915. The railway decided not to proceed to Dunvegan, and instead built a branch south from Rycroft to Grande Prairie in 1916 (400 miles or 640 kilometres northwest from Edmonton).

In 1924 the line was extended to Wembley, and it reached Hythe in 1928. In 1930 the line was extended westward across the provincial boundary to its western terminus at Dawson Creek, British Columbia.

=== Alberta and Great Waterways Railway ===
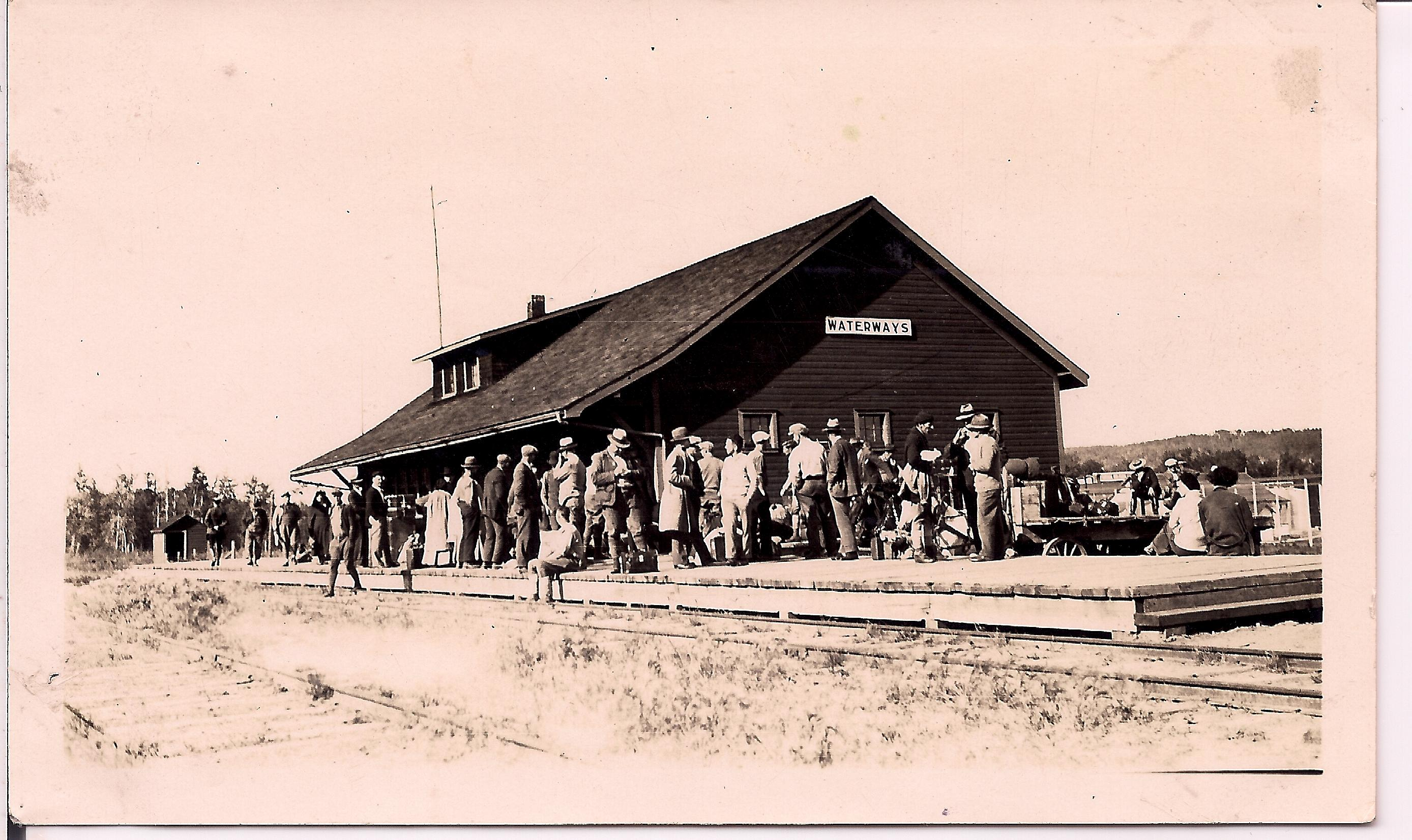
View of the Waterways station, about 1920.

In 1909 a charter was granted to the Alberta and Great Waterways Railway (A&GW) to build from Edmonton to Waterways, Alberta, on the Athabasca River. Construction faltered and the A&GW political scandal ensued, and the line was rechartered in 1913 under the ownership of John Duncan McArthur. Construction of the A&GW began in 1914 from Carbondale and reached Lac La Biche in 1916. It reached Draper in 1922 and its terminus at Waterways in 1925. The railway was transferred to ownership of the Government of Alberta on July 28, 1920. Carbondale Station was destroyed on November 10, 1959, following a head-on collision of a steam engine and a diesel engine.

=== Central Canada Railway ===
In 1913 a charter was granted to the Central Canada Railway (CCR) under the ownership of J.D. McArthur to build a junction with the ED&BC near Aggie, extending to Peace River Crossing to access barge traffic on the Peace River. Construction of the CCR began in 1914 and was completed in 1916.

The CCR was subsequently extended to Berwyn in 1921, then to Whitelaw in 1924, Fairview in 1928 and Hines Creek in 1930.

=== Pembina Valley Railway ===
In 1926, the provincial legislature passed a statute authorizing the government to construct the Pembina Valley Railway from Busby, Alberta, where it connected to the ED&BC line, to Barrhead, Alberta.

== Provincial ownership ==
In 1920, the lines owned by J.D. McArthur entered financial difficulties following the First World War. Coinciding with the problems faced by the McArthur lines (ED&BC, A&GW, and CCR), both the Grand Trunk Pacific Railway (GTPR) and Canadian Northern Railway (CNoR) had fallen victim to similar circumstances brought about by the financial strain of the conflict and falling traffic levels. The Dominion government had nationalized the GTPR and CNoR, along with other previously federally owned lines into the Canadian National Railways.

Following the federal example, and in an attempt to preserve rail service to northern and northwestern Alberta, the provincial government leased the ED&BC and CCR in 1920 for five years. In 1921 the government entered into a five-year agreement with the Canadian Pacific Railway (CPR) to operate the ED&BC and CCR.

In 1920, the provincial government purchased the A&GW outright and chose to operate it separately.

CPR immediately raised freight rates on the ED&BC and CCR lines, charging "mountain prices", claiming that the cost of operating on grades into the Peace and Smoky River valleys of the northwestern prairie was as much as it cost to operate in the Rocky Mountains. Consequently, Peace River farmers paid the highest freight charges on the Canadian prairies to reach the lakehead at Port Arthur and Fort William.

The provincial government purchased the ED&BC and CCR from McArthur in 1925, following the expiration of the five-year lease. Dissatisfied with the CPR's operation of the ED&BC and CCR, the provincial government allowed the operating contract for these railways to expire in 1926, with operations subsequently taken over by the new provincial Department of Railways and Telecommunications, which was also tasked to operate the AG&W and the newly built PVR.

In 1928, the provincial government began to solicit proposals from both the CPR and the Canadian National Railways (CNR) for purchasing the provincial railways. In 1924, CNR president Sir Henry Thornton visited the ED&BC line and in 1928, CPR president Edward Beatty did the same.

== Northern Alberta Railways ==
In 1928 the provincial government grouped the ED&BC, CCR, AG&W, and PVR under the collective name Northern Alberta Railways (NAR), which received a federal charter in March 1929. Under UFA Premier Brownlee, the NAR was sold to both the CNR and CPR in equal portions with both companies agreeing to maintain the NAR as a joint subsidiary. At that time, the NAR was the third-largest railway in Canada. In 1937 the NAR began to show a profit for the first time.

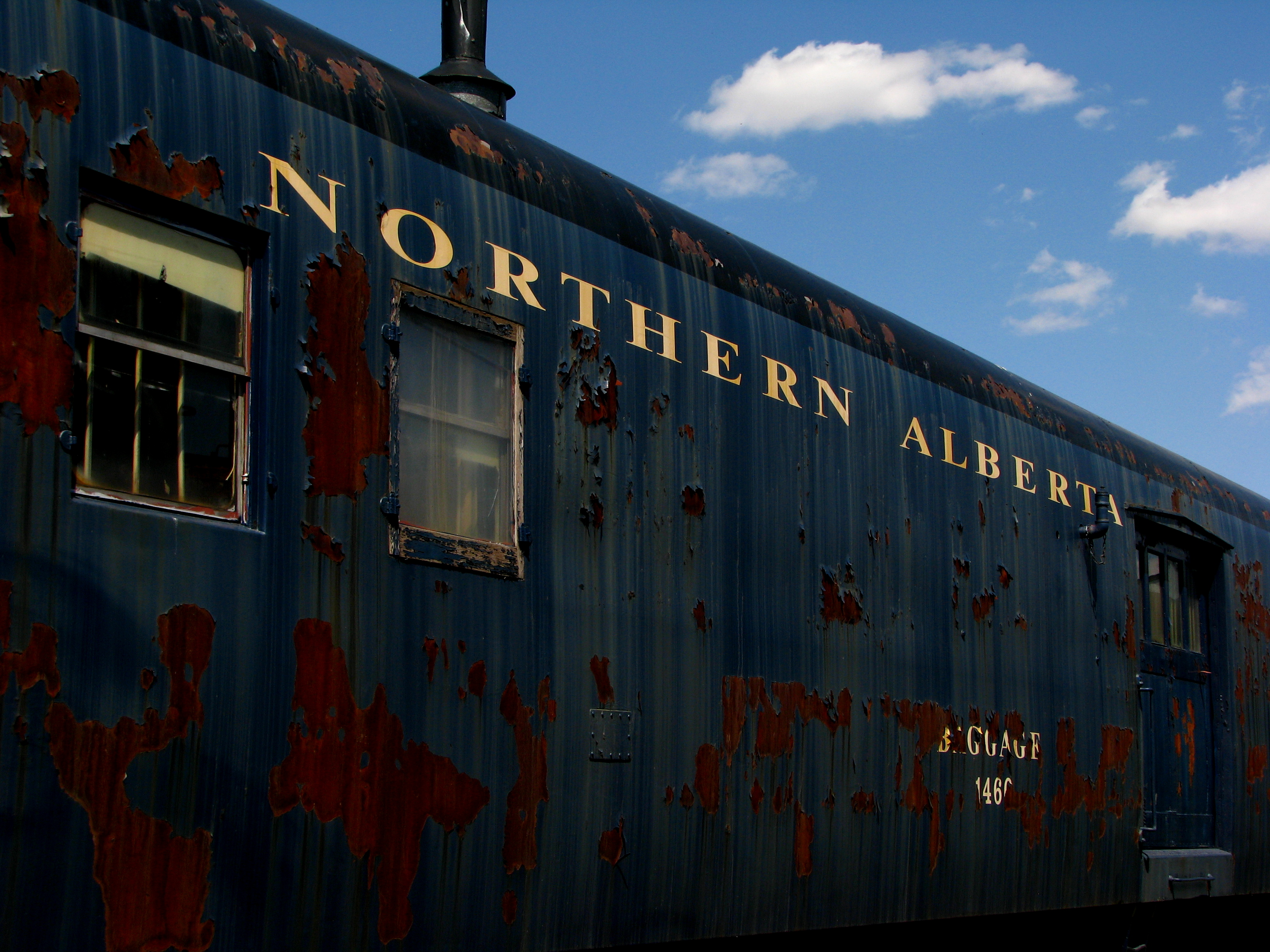
Preserved NAR baggage car.

In summer 1942, following the entry of the United States into the Second World War, the Alaska Highway civil defence project resulted in tremendous growth for the NAR, as the system was the only railway to service Alaska Highway mile 0 at Dawson Creek, British Columbia.

NAR also saw increased traffic from defence spending in both the Peace River and Fort McMurray regions as Royal Canadian Air Force training bases for the British Commonwealth Air Training Plan were established.

In 1958 the Pacific Great Eastern Railway (PGE), owned by the province of British Columbia, built east to Dawson Creek and then north to Fort St. John. Traffic from Dawson Creek which used to run on NAR now mostly ran on PGE.

NAR's locomotive fleet was completely dieselized by October 1960 with EMD GP9's 201–210 (208 was wrecked, rebuilt and renumbered 211 in 1972.), and GMD GMD1's 301–305. NAR also purchased two Canadian National GMD1's, numbers 1072 and 1077, in January 1962, and renumbered them 311 and 312 respectively. A final locomotive purchase was made in December 1975 from General Motors Diesel Division of London for GMD SD38-2's 401–404. The only Canadian built SD38-2's.

Beginning in the 1960s, Alberta's nascent oil and gas industry began to affect the NAR as traffic began to increase on both the Dawson Creek and Fort McMurray branches. In 1964, the federal government built the Great Slave Lake Railway north from the NAR at Grimshaw, Alberta, to Hay River, Northwest Territories, to carry cargo which could then be transferred to barges and continue down the Mackenzie River.

In 1966, the passenger train to Waterways was replaced by Budd Rail Diesel Cars, but the experiment was unsuccessful, and it was replaced in 1967 by a mixed train. On June 1, 1974, the passenger train to Dawson Creek was discontinued.

During the 1970s, significant investments also began in the Fort McMurray region as the Athabasca Oil Sands deposits began to be exploited.

== Canadian National Railway ==
On January 1, 1981, CN (name/initialism change after 1960) bought out CPR's share in the NAR system and incorporated these lines into the CN network, allowing CN to operate unhindered north from Edmonton to Hay River, Northwest Territories, and west to Dawson Creek, British Columbia. NAR disappeared as a corporate entity with the departure of CPR from the joint ownership. NAR shops and Dunvegan Yards in Edmonton were demolished and the new Dunvegan Woods housing development was built on the site.

In 1996, CN identified parts of its former NAR trackage for divestiture, either through sale or abandonment. Several lines were subsequently sold to shortline operators.

- Swan Landing, Alberta (near Jasper) to Grande Prairie, Alberta (the former Alberta Resources Railway) and west to Hythe, Alberta (west of Grande Prairie on the NAR) was operated by Alberta Railnet (ARN), which was owned by North American Railnet, and later renamed to the Savage Alberta Railway (SAR). On December 1, 2006, CN announced that it had purchased Savage Alberta Railway for $25 million and that it had begun operating the railway the same day. CN had also maintained ownership of the portion between Hythe, Alberta, and Dawson Creek, British Columbia, where it connects to former BC Rail trackage. The trackage between Hythe and Dawson Creek fell into disuse in 1998, but CN agreed to re-open it as a condition of purchasing BC Rail.
- Edmonton to Boyle (south of Fort McMurray) was purchased in 1997 by the Lakeland and Waterways Railway (LWR), a subsidiary of Canadian shortline holding company RailLink. RailLink was subsequently purchased by RailAmerica.
- Boyle, Alberta, to Fort McMurray, Alberta, was operated by Athabasca Northern Railway and was owned by shortline operator Cando Contracting., before being reacquired by CN in 2007.
- CN maintains ownership of former NAR trackage between Edmonton and Smith, Alberta.
- North and west of Smith, Alberta, the former NAR to Peace River, Alberta, and Grimshaw, Alberta, as well as all of the ex-Great Slave Railway north from Grimshaw, Alberta, to Hay River, Northwest Territories, was purchased in 1998 by the Mackenzie Northern Railway (MKNR), a subsidiary of Canadian shortline holding company RailLink. RailLink was subsequently purchased by RailAmerica.
- On January 19, 2006, CN announced the purchase from RailAmerica Inc. of the Mackenzie Northern Railway, the Lakeland & Waterways Railway, and the Central Western Railway (jointly known as RLGN/CWRL).
