= Elks of Canada =

Canadian fraternal order

- Founded: September 26, 1912; 114 years ago Vancouver, British Columbia, Canada
- Type: Fraternal order
- Affiliation: Independent
- Former affiliation: Benevolent and Protective Order of Elks
- Status: Active
- Scope: National
- Philanthropy: Elks & Royal Purple Fund for Children
- Chapters: 200 lodges
- Members: 300,000+ lifetime
- Headquarters: 402-2631 28th Avenue; Regina, Saskatchewan S4S 6X3; Canada
- Website: www.elksofcanada.ca

Elks of Canada is a fraternal organization that was founded in 1912 as a separate but affiliated entity of the Benevolent and Protective Order of Elks. Although the Elks of Canada became a separate entity in 1970, the two "share a common history and enjoy a friendly relationship."

== History ==
On June 12, 1912, three men from Seattle, Washington - N. D. Woodworth, A. M. Sommers, and Irvin Baruch - received articles of incorporation from the Dominion of Canada to promote and begin a Canadian lodge of the Benevolent and Protective Order of Elks (B.P.O.E.). However, only Woodworth had previously been a member of the B.P.O.E. and did not receive authorization from the B.P.O.E. to establish a Canadian lodge. Charles Edward Redeker, a Canadian seeking to establish the B.P.O.E. in Canada, received permission from the Grand Exalted Ruler of the American B.P.O.E. to start a lodge in Vancouver, British Columbia. On September 26, 1912, Redeker and other interested parties met in Vancouver to officially form the B.P.O.E. During the meeting Redeker was appointed as the first Grand Exalted Ruler of the Grand Lodge of Canada, the body overseeing the organization of future lodges.

Despite financial problems, the B.P.O.E. rapidly expanded throughout Canada. In November, 1913, it relocated its headquarters to Toronto to better serve the rapidly growing number of lodges in eastern Canada. By 1914, there were 37 B.P.O.E. lodges across Canada.

In November 1913, the B.P.O.E started its first magazine, The Dominion Elk, the same month. The Dominion Elk ceased publication in November 1914 and was republished beginning in 1917. Due to financial difficulties, the magazine was discontinued in 1933, with two brief issues appearing in 1939. The magazine was reintroduced in 1947. The paper was eventually replaced by the Canadian Elk which continues to be published today.

In 1970, the Elks of Canada became a separate entity from the American B.O.P.E. The organization continues to grow, with lodges across the country.

== Membership ==
As of 2024, membership requires one to be a person of good reputation, be an adherent of lawful governance and ordinance, and be at least sixteen years of age. Until 1998, women were excluded from the Elks of Canada.

In 1979 it had 300,000 members. In 2024, it has more than 200 lodges and more than 7,000 active members. Its headquarters are located at 402-2631 28th Avenue in Regina, Saskatchewan.

=== Past Grand Exalted Rulers ===
This is a list of the past Grand Exalted Rulers, the national organization's president.

- 1912: Charles E. Redeker
- 1913: Ernest W. Hachmuth
- 1913: John Stillwell Clute
- 1914: Alexander Cameron Rutherford
- 1915: Alexander Cameron Rutherford
- 1916: Alexander Cameron Rutherford
- 1917: William T. Perkins
- 1918: William T. Perkins
- 1919: Joseph F. Morris
- 1920: Joseph F. Morris
- 1921: Royal T. Pendray
- 1922: W. A. Cantelon
- 1923: W. Frank Murphy
- 1924: Colonel Royal Burritt
- 1925: Colonel Royal Burritt
- 1926: Colonel Royal Burritt
- 1927: Gerald Sims
- 1928: Gerald Sims
- 1929: Ernest E. Hand
- 1930: Ernest E. Hand
- 1931: Ernest E. Hand
- 1932: Ernest E. Hand
- 1933: Dr. William Spankie
- 1934: Dr. William Spankie
- 1935: Alexander McIntyre
- 1936: Alexander McIntyre
- 1937: P.W. Pound
- 1938: John Vaselenak
- 1939: L.F. McDonald
- 1940: W. G. King
- 1941: C.A. Vaughan
- 1942: J.F. Ferguson
- 1943: A.E. Eamer
- 1944: H.H. Greaves
- 1945: F.N. Haney
- 1946: Harrison Peile
- 1947: A.G. Smellie
- 1948: J.W. Willey
- 1949: C.K. French
- 1950: G.N. Roberts
- 1951: C.W. Pooles
- 1952: K.L. Lawson
- 1953: J.N.S. Dixon
- 1954: C.C. Howard
- 1955: J.D. (Bert) Jackson
- 1956: J.F. Bate
- 1957: W. J. Alton
- 1958: H. E. Ryan
- 1959: E.G. Freeman
- 1960: S.F. Otto
- 1961: E.J. Idler
- 1962: Henri Delorme
- 1963: J.E. Greco
- 1964: Sam Dare
- 1965: Adam Deminick
- 1966: R.K. Coulling
- 1967: R. E. Robert
- 1968: D.C. Carlson
- 1969: Ken Gooding
- 1970: G. Art Van
- 1972: Chas. A. Quail
- 1973: P.A. Lafontaine
- 1974: R. H. Jackman
- 1975: Dr. N. J. Kuzyk
- 1976: Henry J. Chung
- 1977: Andy Kapp
- 1978: Charles F. Clarke
- 1979: A. J. (Al) Malakoe
- 1980: Gordon Brewer
- 1981: Cliff Blackmur
- 1982: Ron Witherell
- 1983: Don MacMillan
- 1984: Joe Dumontel
- 1985: Vic Dyck
- 1986: Tom Cuming
- 1987: Vern Hoff
- 1988: Charlie McMechan
- 1989: Dick Hollier
- 1990: Jack Blinston
- 1991: Clem Frechette
- 1992: Joe Calder
- 1993: Eugene Wood
- 1994: Don Kidd
- 1995: Nick Kowtaluk
- 1996: Dennis Stewart
- 1998: Don Fowler
- 1999: Paul Clendenning
- 2000: Bob Manning
- 2001: Leonard Kolb
- 2002: Roland Gagnon
- 2003: Wayne Herod
- 2004: Al Busby
- 2005: Mark Montgomery
- 2006: Bill Ward
- 2007: Alistair (Scotty) Edwards
- 2008: D. Clark Killburn
- 2009: Duane Romuld
- 2010: Dave Hurley
- 2011: R. Jerry Wernickle
- 2012: Robert Larsen
- 2013: Jim McLeod
- 2014: Duane Felt
- 2015: Dominic Leach
- 2016: Denis Ellingboe
- 2017: Deborah Sallenbacl
- 2018: Ron Potter
- 2019: Derek Barkley
- 2020: Derek Barkley
- 2021: Derek Barkley / Maurice W. Koszman
- 2022: Leonard Shain
- 2023: Don Gillis
- 2024: Milles Read
- 2025: Kari Senko

== Activity ==
The Elks of Canada's national charity is the Elks & Royal Purple Fund for Children. Founded in 1956, the charity provides financial assistance for the medical needs of children with hearing and speech disorders under the age of 19.

== In popular culture ==
- Winnipeg-based indie rock group The Weakerthans have a song entitled "Psalm for the Elks Lodge Last Call".
- In 1922, the Edmonton Eskimos, the local football club, briefly renamed itself the Edmonton Elks after receiving a major financial donation from the local Elks service club (Benevolent and Protective Order of Elks / Elks of Canada).

== See also ==
- Order of Royal Purple, the Elks of Canada former auxiliary group
- Improved Benevolent and Protective Order of Elks of the World
