= Stanley Harwood McCuaig =

Stanley Harwood McCuaig CM QC LLD
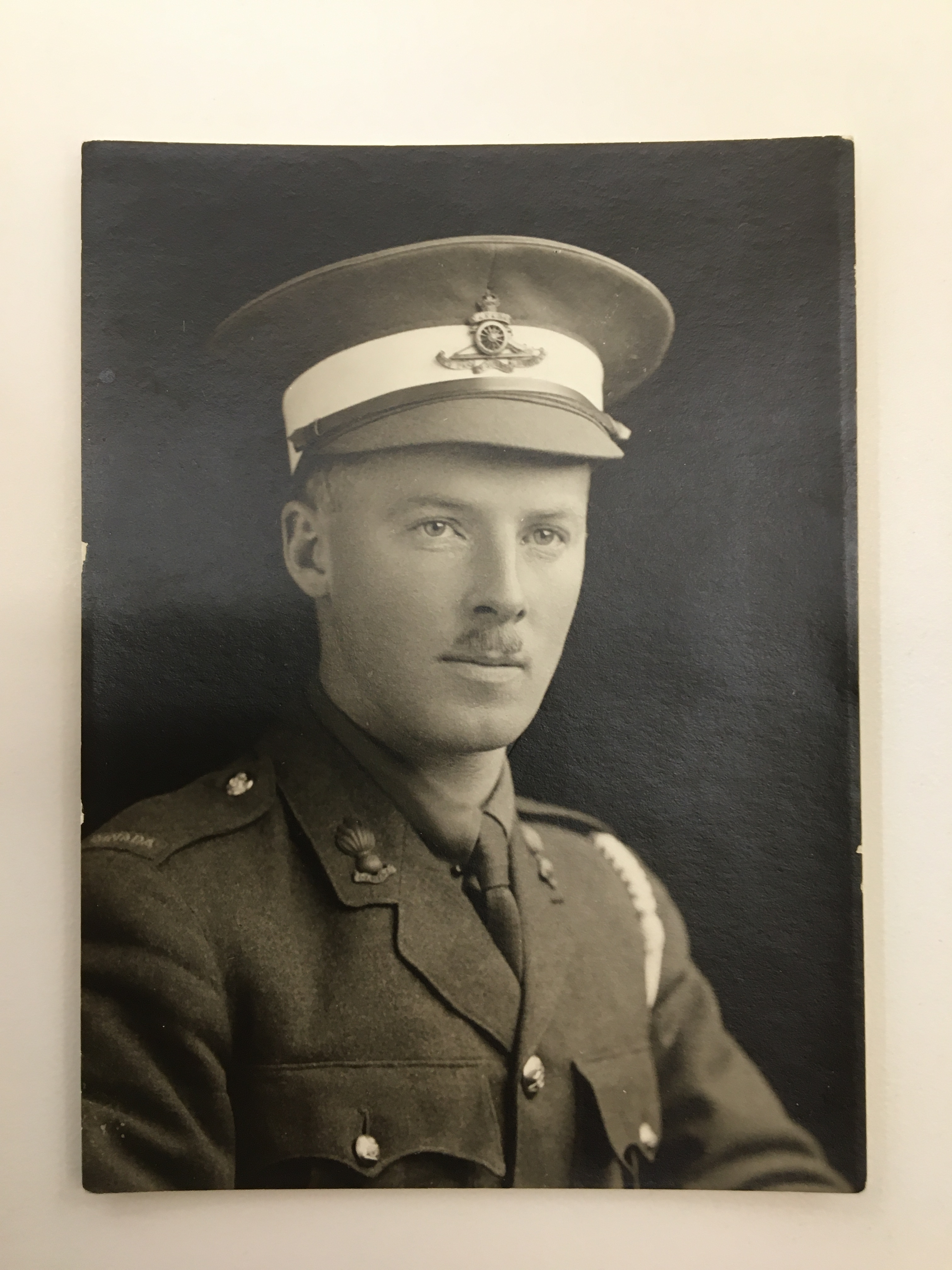
- Stanley Harwood McCuaig, 1917

20th president of the Canadian Bar Association
- In office 1948–1949
- Preceded by: John Thomas Hackett, KC
- Succeeded by: A.N. Carter, K.C., LL.D.

President of the Law Society of Alberta
- In office 1952–1953
- Preceded by: Laurence Yeomans Cairns, QC, LL.D.
- Succeeded by: Everett James Chambers, QC

Personal details
- Born: February 11, 1891 Bainsville, Ontario
- Died: March 6, 1986 (aged 95) Edmonton, Alberta
- Spouse: Hazel Rutherford
- Relations: Alexander Rutherford, former premier of Alberta (father-in-law); J. D. McArthur, prominent railway contractor (Uncle); John Matheson (nephew)
- Children: Eric Alexander Duncan McCuaig, Q.C. (1920-2015); Ruth Bate (née McCuaig) (1922-1983); Helen "Honey" Rutherford McEvoy (née McCuaig) (1924-2016); Harwood Stanley McCuaig (1926-2015)
- Education: Queen's University
- Profession: Lawyer

Military service
- Allegiance: Canadian Army
- Branch/service: Royal Canadian Artillery
- Years of service: 1917–18
- Battles/wars: World War I: Western Front

Stanley Harwood McCuaig, CM QC (February 11, 1891 – March 6, 1986), was a prominent Canadian lawyer in Edmonton, Alberta and former president of the Canadian Bar Association and Law Society of Alberta.

== Early life and education ==
McCuaig was born at Bainsville, Ontario, the eldest son of Duncan Donald McCuaig and Catherine (née McIntosh) McCuaig. He attended primary school in Bainsville, and high school in Williamstown and Glencoe. Upon graduation, he briefly attended normal school in Cornwall, Ontario, before enrolling in Queen's University at Kingston, Ontario in 1909. An active student, he served as manager for the Queen's University hockey team, first vice president of the Alma Mater Society, and at various points the orator, secretary, and president of the Arts Association. He graduated with a degree of Bachelor of Arts in 1913.

During the summers between his studies and for a year following graduation, Stanley obtained work with his uncle John Duncan McArthur, a prominent railway contractor, as a timekeeper and paymaster for the Hudson's Bay Railway. In 1914, he moved west to Edmonton, Alberta, where he became a law student at the University of Alberta and articled underneath Alexander Cameron Rutherford, the former premier of Alberta.

== Military service ==
Stanley first entered military service in January 1917, when he gained entrance to the Royal Canadian Horse Artillery. After training in Kingston and Petawawa, he returned to Edmonton. On April 20, 1917, at Lethbridge, Alberta McCuaig enlisted in the Canadian Army, joining the Canadian Field Artillery (78th Depot Battery) of the Royal Regiment of Canadian Artillery. He arrived in England in January 1918, and after additional training arrived in France in March 1918. He fought on the Western Front with the Canadian Corps until October when he was offered a medal or officers' training by a commanding officer. Selecting the latter, McCuaig was sent for officers' training in England in late October. He remained in England until the end of the war.

== Personal and Professional Life ==
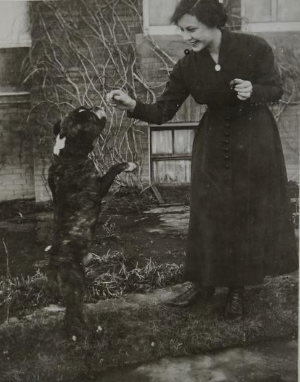
Hazel (Rutherford) McCuaig and dog Jellicoe (1916) at Rutherford House, Edmonton, Alberta

After the war, McCuaig returned to Edmonton and resumed working with Rutherford. On September 17, 1919, McCuaig married Rutherford's daughter, Hazel Rutherford. The wedding took place in the Rutherford family home, now a museum. Together, the couple had four children: two sons and two daughters.

McCuaig and his family were long-time members of First Presbyterian Church of Edmonton. The family were also active in the Edmonton community. Stanley served on the boards of many organizations, including the United Way, and as chairman of the board for both the Misrecordia Hospital and of the Sisters of Our Lady in Refuge.

In 1936, McCuaig purchased a summer cottage for Hazel at Kapasiwin as a birthday present. The same year, he was elected to the Kapasiwin Summer Village Council. He served on the village council until 1942.

=== Legal career ===
McCuaig practiced with the Rutherford firm for many years, becoming a full partner in 1923 alongside his brother-in-law Cecil Rutherford. In 1939, he left to establish his own firm, McCuaig, Desrochers, Beckingham & McDonald, which continues today as McCuaig Desrochers LLP. In 1948, his son Eric McCuaig joined the firm. McCuaig practiced law in Edmonton for almost 60 years, setting very high practice standards for himself and for the firm.

In 1949 and 1950, McCuaig was the president of the Canadian Bar Association, a voluntary professional association of lawyers across Canada. He was also made an honorary member of the American Bar Association in 1949. From 1952 to 1953, he served as the president of the Law Society of Alberta, the regulatory body for lawyers in Alberta. Some twenty years later, his son Eric McCuaig was also elected president of the Law Society.

== Death and Honours ==
Following a lengthy illness, McCuaig died in Edmonton on February 11, 1986. He is buried in the Mount Pleasant Cemetery.

Throughout his life, he received many awards in recognition of his public and legal. In 1949, Queen's University awarded him an honorary Doctor of Laws degree. In recognition of his public service service, he was named Edmonton's "citizen of the year" in 1955. In 1972 he was named to the Order of Canada and received the Bene Merenti medal from Pope Paul VI the following year for his work with charitable causes, including the Misericordia Hospital and Sisters of Charity of Saint Vincent de Paul (Halifax).

The Dr. Stanley Harwood McCuaig Scholarship is awarded at Queen's Law School to students with high standing in courses in Property Law, Business Associations and Commercial Law.
