= J. D. McArthur =

Canadian businessman and industrialist

John Duncan McArthur
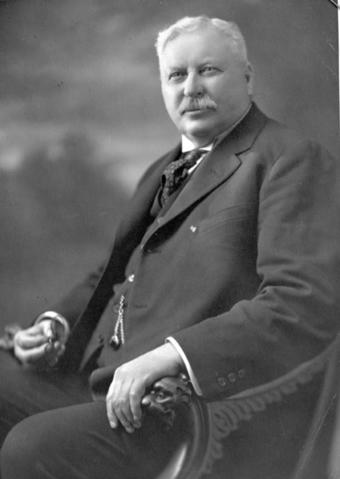
- John Duncan McArthur (1922)
- Born: 25 June, 1854; Glengarry County, Canada West (Ontario)
- Died: 10 January, 1927 (aged 72); Winnipeg, Manitoba
- Resting place: St. John's Cathedral Cemetery, Winnipeg, Manitoba
- Occupations: Railway contractor, Businessman
- Spouse: Mary McIntosh (m: 1889)
- Relatives: Stanley Harwood McCuaig (nephew)

John Duncan McArthur (June 25, 1854 – January 10, 1927) was a Canadian industrialist, businessman, and railway builder. Born in Lancaster township, Glengarry County, Canada West, he worked as a farmer before heading west to Manitoba in search of work on railway crews in 1879. He quickly established himself as a capable railroad contractor and obtained numerous small contracts on the building of the Canadian Pacific Railway in Manitoba and the North-West Territories. He also built lines in Saskatchewan and Alberta, including extensive portions of the Alberta and Great Waterways Railway and Grand Trunk Pacific Railway. He also had significant investments in lumber, mining, and real estate, and built the first high-rise in Winnipeg, the McArthur Building. He is considered to be "one of western Canada’s greatest railway contractors" and businessmen, having built over 2,833 miles [4,559 km] of track.

== Early and personal life ==
McArthur was born to Duncan McArthur and Christina (nee McCuaig) McArthur on 25 June 1854 in Lancaster, Glengarry County, Canada West. He was educated at local schools in Glengarry County and spent much of his adolescence working on his family's farm. Dissatisfied with farm life, McArthur travelled to Michigan to work in the state's lumber industry in the 1870s, before leaving for Manitoba in 1879 in search of work and adventure.

While living in Manitoba, McArthur kept in contact with his childhood sweetheart, Mary McIntosh. He returned east to Glengarry County in January 1889, and on 16 January 1889, the two married and shortly thereafter relocated to Winnipeg. The couple had no children.

== Professional life ==
In 1879, encouraged by Horace Greeley's slogan to "go west, young man," McArthur travelled west to Manitoba over the Dawson Trail. Arriving in St. Boniface on 1 April 1879, McArthur found work first cutting timber for railway construction, before finding employment with "flying crews" – specialized railway repair crews – maintaining Winnipeg's railway connections with Saint Paul and Minneapolis. Two years later, McArthur signed his first subcontract for heavy rock cutting with the Canadian Pacific Railway between Winnipeg and Fort William. The successful completion of this work led to several other large contracts associated with the construction of the Canadian Pacific Railway. This included a financially lucrative contract from James Ross – the Canadian Pacific Railway's mountain construction chief – to build sections of the transcontinental line in the Canadian Rockies.

In 1901, McArthur decided to invest in a sawmill and brick factory. However, it was not until 1906 that he took on the major job of constructing 400 km (250 mi) of the Grand Trunk Pacific Railway. Four years later McArthur almost went bankrupt on the construction of the Edmonton, Dunvegan and British Columbia Railway. He tried to build an extensive system in Alberta, the Edmonton, Dunvegan and British Columbia Railway, which was hampered by the First World War.

== Death and honours ==
In December 1926, McArthur fell ill with pernicious anemia and sought treatment at Mount Clemens, Michigan. Seeing little improvement, he relocated to Battle Creek Sanitarium. Despite optimism that he would recover, McArthur's condition continued to deteriorate, and on 10 January 1927, McArthur died in Winnipeg, shortly after returning from Battle Creek. He is buried in St. John's Cathedral Cemetery, in Winnipeg.

In recognition of his impact on western Canada, the McArthur Falls on the Winnipeg River and McArthur Street in Lac du Bonnet, Manitoba. In 1955, the Government of Manitoba named the McArthur Hydroelectric Generating Station – located on McArthur Falls – in his honour.
