= Rutherford House =

Historic building in Edmonton, Alberta, Canada

- Rutherford House in 2026
- Interactive map of the Rutherford House area
- Alternative names: Achnacarry

General information
- Status: Completed
- Type: Museum
- Architectural style: Georgian & Jacobethan Revival
- Location: 11153 Saskatchewan Drive, Edmonton, Alberta, Canada
- Coordinates: 53°31′39″N 113°31′13″W
- Named for: Alexander Cameron Rutherford
- Construction started: October 1909
- Completed: February 1911
- Cost: $25,000 (1911)

Technical details
- Material: Brick, Sandstone

Design and construction
- Architects: A.G. Wilson & D. Easton Herrald
- Main contractor: James Smith & J.T. Radford

Website
- rutherfordhouse.ca

Alberta Historic Resources Act
- Type: Provincial Historic Site
- Designated: 28 June 1979

Rutherford House is a historic building and museum in the Strathcona area of Edmonton, Alberta, Canada. The structure was the home of the first Premier of Alberta, Alexander Cameron Rutherford, from 1911 to 1940, and has subsequently been designated as an Alberta provincial historic site.

== Overview ==
Rutherford House was built by Alexander Cameron Rutherford in 1911 on a large lot in the former City of Strathcona near the University of Alberta campus for $25,000. The residence, initially called Achnacarry by the Rutherford family, after their ancestral castle in Scotland, is now known as Rutherford House Provincial Historic Site. In 1966 the house was designated for demolition as the University of Alberta made plans for expansion. It quickly became a public concern to save the structure. The University Women's Club played a key role in saving this historic resource and in 1970 the Alberta government announced its decision that the house would be preserved. The Rutherford House is operated by the Ministry of Arts, Culture and Status of Women (Alberta Culture) and was formerly assisted by the Friends of Rutherford House, a non-profit, charitable society, formed in 1985 to assist the province with the preservation and presentation of it.

== Architecture ==
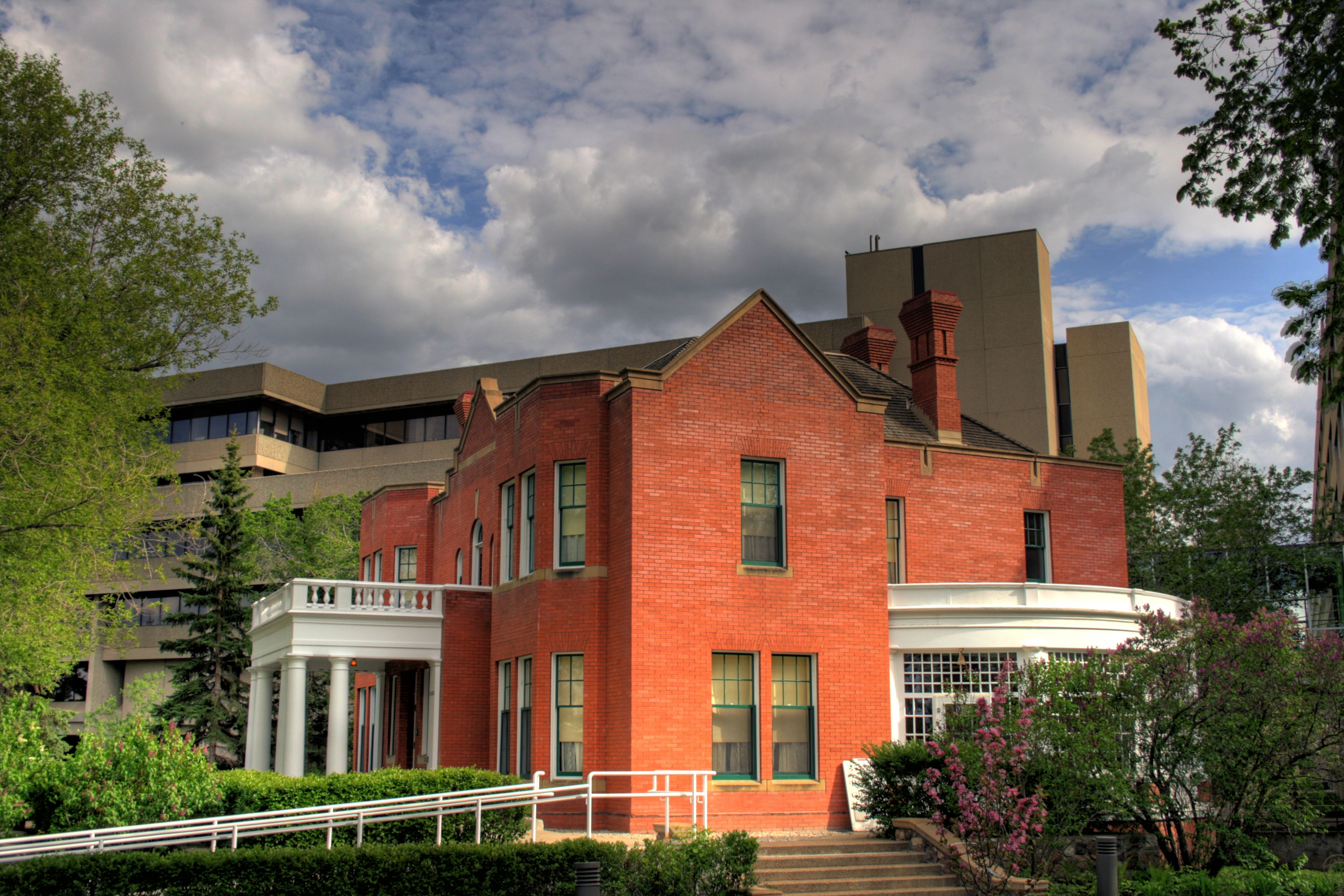
West view of Rutherford House

The two-storey structure features Elizabethan and Jacobean motifs, with red brick exterior with sandstone trim, tall chimneys, columned porches and two-storey bay windows. The interior of Rutherford House was designed to serve as both a residence and for reception, with 11-foot (3.4 m) ceilings, and a grand central hall staircase detailed in oak, with oak panelling and a stained glass skylight. The dining room is the largest room in the house at 350 square feet (33 m^{2}) featuring a 12-foot-wide (3.7 m) bay window with fir wainscotting and decorative fir ceiling beams.

=== History ===
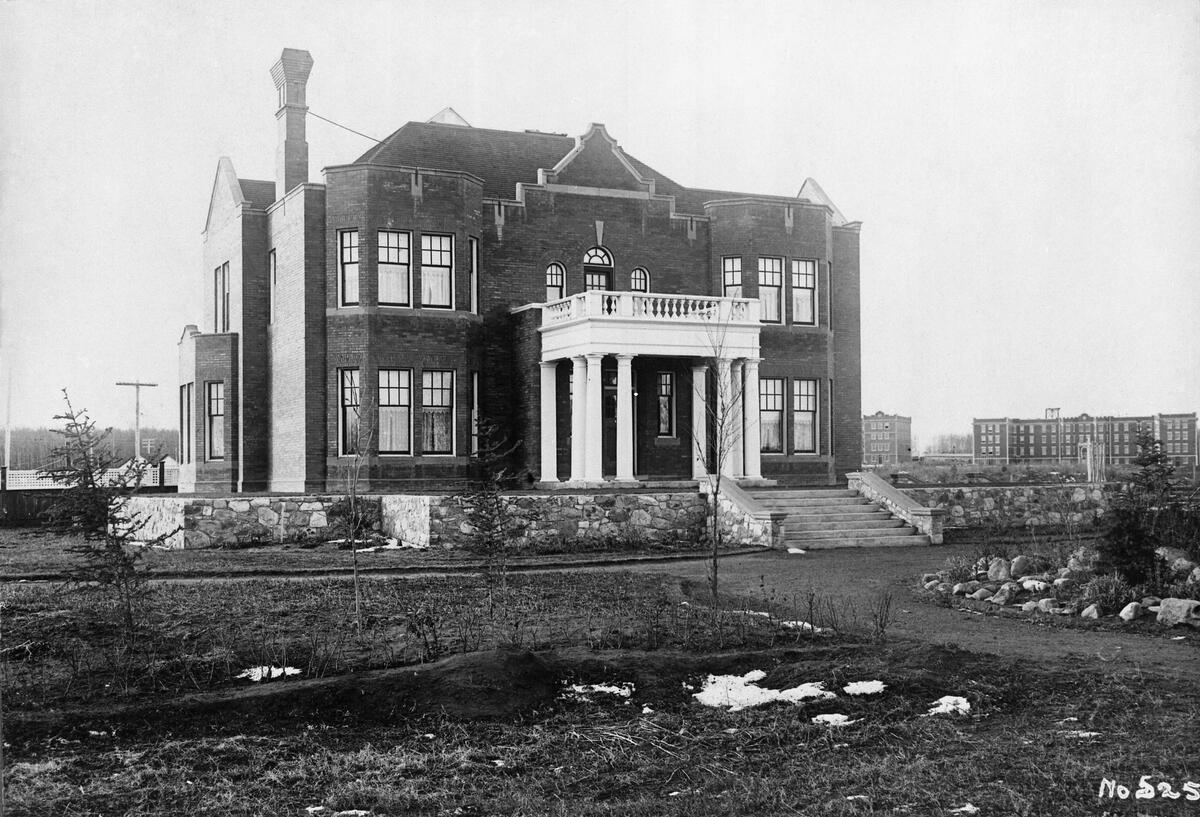
Rutherford House in 1913

On 29 May 1909, Alexander Cameron Rutherford became the owner of a superset of the lot now occupied by Rutherford House. Rutherford purchased the lot from Laurent Garneau, (Note: biography of Garneau) a prominent Métis businessman. The description of him on the certificate title of ownership reads "a gentleman of Strathcona". By late 1909 plans for the house were drawn up by the firm of Arthur G. Wilson and David E. Herrald, British-trained architects and civil engineers, and excavation completed by Strathcona contractors James Smith and J.T. Radford. During the following spring of 1910 Thomas Richards, another Strathcona contractor and master bricklayer, prepared the foundation, which was poured by the end of May 1910. The double brick walls were built during the summer of 1910, with some of the work being done by Thomas Richards himself. E. A. Kemp & Son was contracted to do the plumbing work for the home. Work proceeded on the elegant hardwood interior over the winter, with the house being fit for occupancy by February 1911. Rutherford House when completed in 1911 had a number of modern features including hot running water, electric lighting, flush toilets, and telephones.

The Rutherford family of four, including Alexander Cameron Rutherford, Mattie Birkett Rutherford, Cecil Alexander Rutherford and Hazel Elizabeth Rutherford moved into the home in February 1911. The Rutherfords occupied the house until September 1940, when Mattie Birkett Rutherford died on September 13, 1940.

In June 1941, Rutherford House was sold by Alexander to the University of Alberta Delta Upsilon fraternity chapter for $9500, corresponding to the cost of construction. The negotiations of the sale were handled by Cecil Rutherford and Francis Winspear, a founding member of the Alberta chapter of the Delta Upsilon fraternity.

Between 1941 and 1969, the house was occupied by members of the Delta Upsilon fraternity. Ed Bate was the first member to live in the home, moving in during late 1940 to serve as a caretaker for the home. He later married Ruth McCuaig, one of Rutherford's granddaughters. Roughly twenty to twenty-five members occupied the home throughout the year. Among the hundreds of Delta Upsilon alumni who called Rutherford House home are several individuals of note, including Allan Warrack, Lou Hyndman, and Peter Lougheed, Premier of Alberta from 1971 to 1985.

The Delta Upsilon fraternity vacated the house in 1969, following expropriation by the University of Alberta in 1968. The Board of Governors of the University of Alberta agreed to lease the house to the Alberta government for forty years in late 1970 following an agreement with Minister of Public Works Albert W. Ludwig, following a successful campaign for preservation as an historic site by the University of Alberta Women's Club, including the assistance of the Women's Canadian Club, the Northern Alberta Pioneers and Old Timers Association, the Historical Society of Alberta, the Edmonton Historical Board, Provincial Museum, and the City of Edmonton.

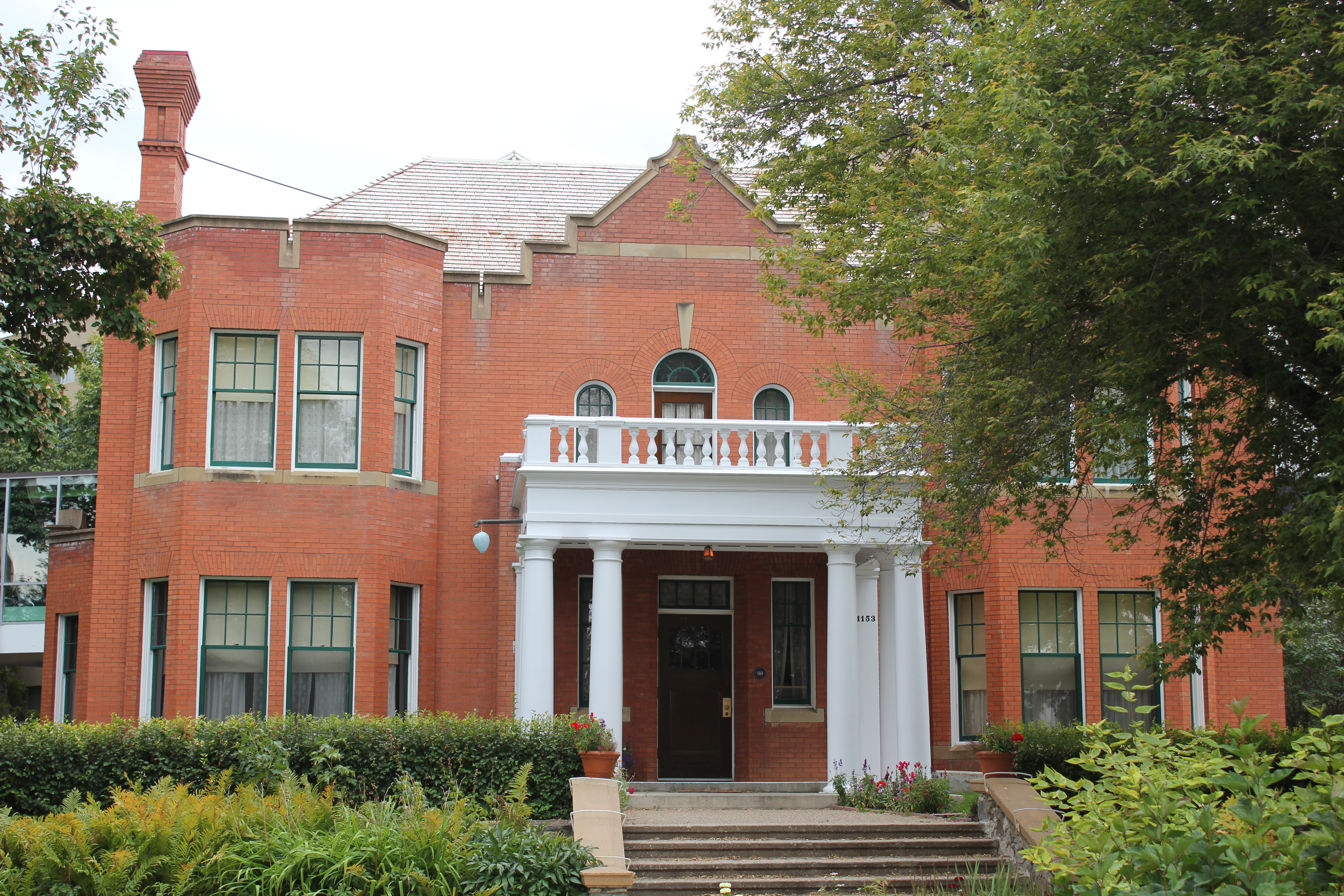
Rutherford House in 2012

Rutherford House Provincial Historic Site opened to the public on May 11, 1974, after three years of restoration. Many of the historic artifacts currently in the house are originals, donated by Hazel Elizabeth Rutherford and Helen Reid Rutherford (Cecil Alexander Rutherford's wife). A copy of Victor Albert Long's portrait of Rutherford also hangs in the home's library.

The site was designated a provincial historic resource on June 28, 1979.

== Friends of Rutherford House Society ==
The society was created on April 22, 1985, as a registered charitable society. Its mandate is to assist in the preservation and promotion of Rutherford House as an important historical site; by fundraising and providing opportunities for the public to learn about Alberta's cultural, social and political history. Up until the mid 2010's it ran a tea room called the Arbour Restaurant or Arbour Room as well as a small gift shop (currently operated by the museum), and used to coordinate all after-hour, private function bookings.

== See also ==
- Achnacarry
- North American fraternity and sorority housing

== Sources ==
- Babcock, Douglas R. (1989). A gentleman of Strathcona: Alexander Cameron Rutherford. Calgary, Alberta: The University of Calgary Press. ISBN 0-919813-65-8.
