= Great Western Garment Co. =

Canadian clothing company

The Great Western Garment Company (GWG) was a Canadian denim and western wear clothing company founded in 1911 in Edmonton, Alberta by Charles A. Graham, Alfred E. Jackson, and Alexander Cameron Rutherford, the first Premier of Alberta. The company was acquired by Levi Strauss, starting in 1961.

== Description ==
The Great Western Garment Company was a Canadian denim and western wear clothing company. The company's slogan of "They wear longer because they're made stronger" suggests the clothing's intended market: farmers and working-class people. The company also appealed to a working class demographic with their affordable pricing, usually 2/3 the price of red-tab Levi's jeans.

== History ==
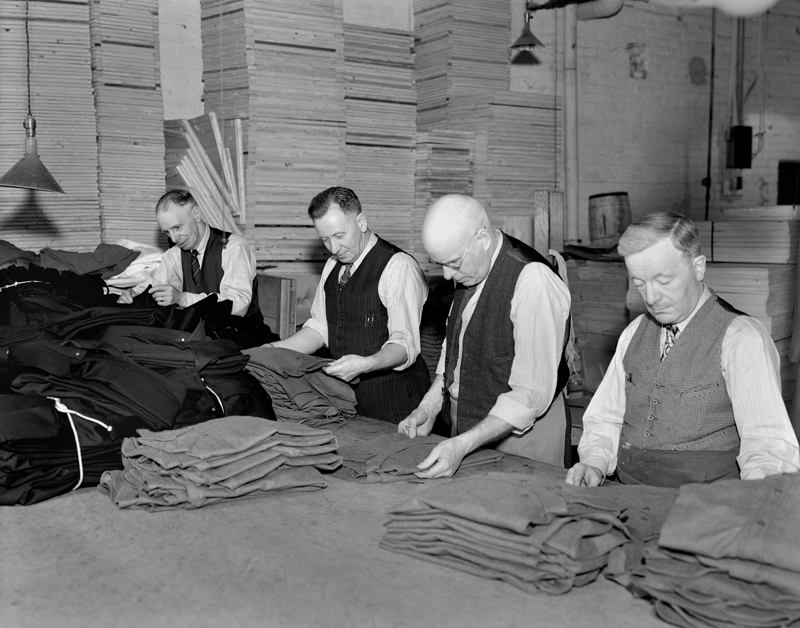
Preparing clothes for shipment to the Netherlands, Edmonton 1946

=== Independent operation ===
GWG was founded in 1911 in Edmonton, Alberta by Charles A. Graham, Alfred E. Jackson, and Alexander Cameron Rutherford (the first Premier of Alberta). In 1917, the company instituted an 8-hour day and 44-hour week, making it one of the first in North America to do so.

The company provided clothing for the war effort during both World Wars. During World War II, GWG produced up to 100,000 pieces of military clothing per month for the Canadian and Allied armed forces, making it the largest clothing manufacturer in the British Commonwealth.

In 1972, GWG's Donald Freeland developed the stone washed technique for its products, increasing the softness and flexibility of the rigid denim fabric. During the remainder of the 1970s, the denim and textiles industry fully adopted the stone-washing technique, helping to bring denim to a larger and more versatile market.

=== Acquisition ===
In 1961, Levi Strauss acquired 75 percent of GWG, expanding these holdings to 100 percent in 1972, at a time when GWG held roughly 30 percent of the Canadian jeanswear market.

Market share for the workman like quality of GWG jeans fell as designer label and fashion oriented jeans grew in popularity. By the early 1990s, the GWG brand held less than 5 percent of the Canadian market. The same conditions were impacting the market share for the Levi brand, leading to Levi Strauss closing a number of factories worldwide and taking direct control of the operations of GWG in 2002. Attempts to make the GWG brand profitable again were not successful, and the Edmonton GWG factory, along with all remaining Levi Strauss factories in North America, closed in 2004.
