= Alexander Cameron Rutherford =

Canadian lawyer and politician (1857–1941)

The Honourable Alexander Cameron Rutherford KC
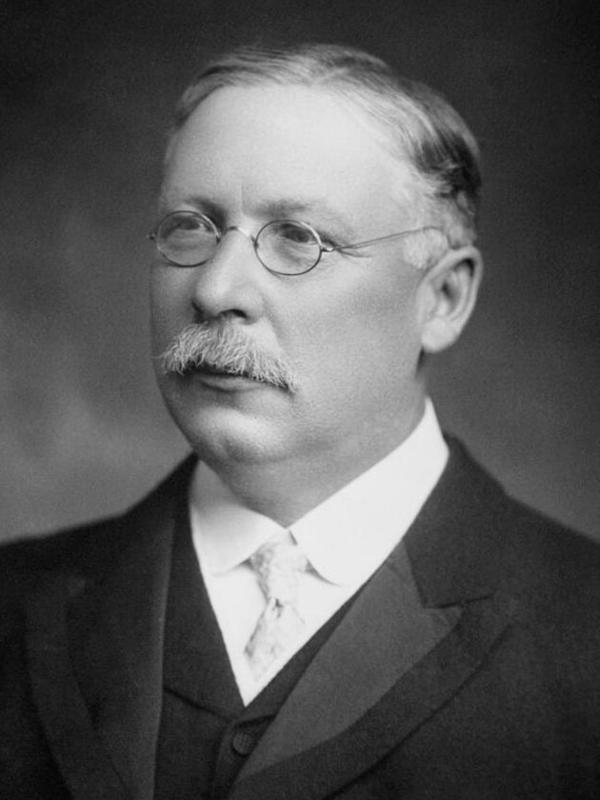
- Portrait c. 1908–1910

1st Premier of Alberta
- In office September 2, 1905 – May 26, 1910
- Monarchs: Edward VII; George V
- Lieutenant Governor: George H. V. Bulyea
- Succeeded by: Arthur Sifton

Member of the Legislative Assembly of Alberta for Strathcona
- In office November 9, 1905 – April 17, 1913
- Preceded by: District established
- Succeeded by: District abolished

Alberta Provincial Treasurer
- In office September 9, 1905 – June 1, 1910
- Preceded by: Position established
- Succeeded by: Arthur Sifton

Alberta Minister of Education
- In office September 9, 1905 – June 1, 1910
- Preceded by: Position established
- Succeeded by: Charles R. Mitchell

Alberta Minister of Railways
- In office November 1, 1909 – June 1, 1910
- Preceded by: Position established
- Succeeded by: Vacant; Arthur Sifton (1912)

Member of the Legislative Assembly of the North-West Territories for Strathcona
- In office May 21, 1902 – September 1, 1905
- Preceded by: District established
- Succeeded by: District abolished

Personal details
- Born: February 2, 1857 near Ormond, Canada West
- Died: June 11, 1941 (aged 84) Edmonton, Alberta, Canada
- Party: Alberta Liberal
- Other political affiliations: North-West Territories Liberal-Conservative Party (1890s–1905)
- Spouse: Mattie Birkett (m. 1888; died 1940)
- Children: 3, including Cecil Alexander Rutherford
- Education: McGill University
- Profession: Lawyer

Alexander Cameron Rutherford KC (February 2, 1857 – June 11, 1941) was a Canadian lawyer, businessman and politician who served as the first premier of Alberta from 1905 to 1910. Born in Ormond, Canada West, he studied and practised law in Ottawa before he moved with his family to the North-West Territories in 1895. Besides his work as lawyer, he began a political career that saw him serve as member of the North-West Legislative Assembly and then as Liberal MLA, Liberal party leader, and premier of Alberta. During his premiership he laid the base for important elements of Alberta society even today, such as the University of Alberta. He lost the premiership in 1910 due to the Alberta and Great Waterways Railway scandal and lost his Legislature seat in 1913. He later was prominent in the administration of the University of Alberta, beside which he and his family lived for decades. His home, Rutherford House, is an historic site on the grounds of the University of Alberta.

In keeping with the territorial custom, while NWT member, Rutherford described himself as an independent but generally supported the administration of NWT Premier Frederick W. A. G. Haultain. Rutherford was a prominent Liberal in federal politics and, after the founding of Alberta as a province in 1905, in provincial politics.

When the Province of Alberta was formed in 1905, its lieutenant governor, George Bulyea, asked Rutherford to lead the new province's first government. As premier, Rutherford's first task was to hold a provincial election, in which he hoped to win a workable majority in the Legislative Assembly of Alberta. This he did in that year's provincial election. He also needed to form a provincial government and set it in operation. His government established a wide range of powers, ranging from speed limits to a provincial court system. The legislature selected Edmonton over rival Calgary as the provincial capital. This was controversial, but with Rutherford's approval. Calgarians' bruised feelings were not salved when the government located the University of Alberta, a project dear to the premier's heart, in his hometown of Strathcona, just across the North Saskatchewan River from Edmonton.

The government was faced with labour unrest in the coal mining industry, which it resolved by establishing a commission to examine the problem. It also set up a provincial government telephone network (Alberta Government Telephones) at great expense, and tried to encourage the development of new railways. It was in pursuit of the last objective that the Rutherford government found itself embroiled in scandal. Early in 1910, William Henry Cushing's resignation as Minister of Public Works precipitated the Alberta and Great Waterways Railway scandal, which turned many, including Liberals, against his government. Pressure from many party figures forced Rutherford to resign as premier. He kept his seat in the legislature after resigning as premier, but he was defeated in the 1913 election by Conservative Herbert Crawford.

After leaving politics, Rutherford continued his law practice and his involvement with a wide range of community groups. Most importantly, he became chancellor of the University of Alberta, whose earlier founding had been a personal project, and stayed in that position until he died of a heart attack. A University of Alberta library, an Edmonton elementary school, and Jasper National Park's Mount Rutherford are named in his honour. Additionally, his home, Rutherford House, was opened as a museum in 1973, and is an Alberta provincial historic site.

== Early life ==
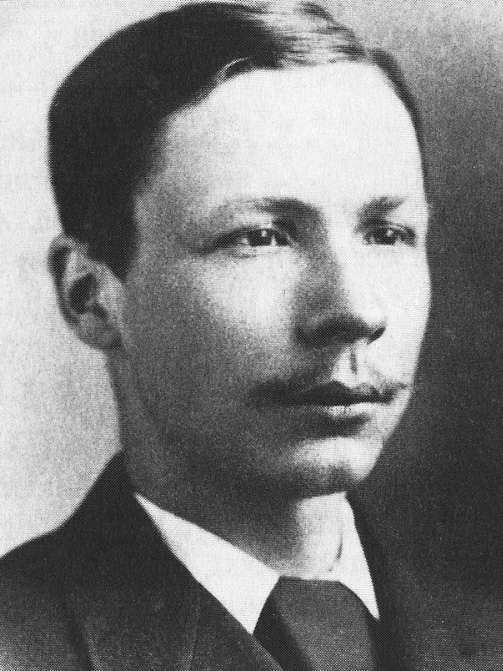
Rutherford as an articled clerk, c. 1883

Alexander Rutherford was born February 2, 1857, near Ormond, Canada West, on his family's dairy farm. His parents, James and Elspet "Elizabeth" Cameron Rutherford, had immigrated from Scotland two years previously. They joined the Baptist Church, and his father joined the Liberal Party of Canada and served for a time on the Osgoode village council. Rutherford attended the local public "scotch school" and, after rejecting dairy farming as a vocation, enrolled in a Metcalfe high school. After graduating in 1874, he attended the Canadian Literary Institute, a Baptist college in Woodstock. He graduated from there in 1876 and taught for a year in Osgoode, having passed his teaching examination the year previous.

He moved to Montreal to study arts and law at McGill University. He was awarded degrees in both in 1881, and joined the Ottawa law firm of Scott, McTavish and McCracken, where he was articled for four years under the tutelage of Richard William Scott. Called to the Ontario bar in 1885, he became a junior partner in the firm of Hodkins, Kidd and Rutherford, with responsibility for its Kemptville office for ten years. He also established a moneylending business there.

Meanwhile, his social circle grew to include William Cameron Edwards. Through Edwards, Rutherford was introduced to the Birkett family, which included former Member of Parliament Thomas Birkett. Rutherford married Birkett's niece, Mattie Birkett, in December 1888. The couple had three children: Cecil (born in 1890), Hazel (born in 1893), and Marjorie (born in 1903 but died sixteen months later). Rutherford had a traditional view of gender roles and was happy to leave most childrearing responsibilities to his wife.

=== Move west ===
In November 1886 Rutherford visited the Canadian West for the first time when he travelled to British Columbia to investigate the disappearance of his cousin. The Rocky Mountains left a great impression on him, as did the coastal climate, which he found "very agreeable". He visited again in the summer of 1894, when he took the Canadian Pacific Railway across the prairies. Upon arriving in South Edmonton, he was excited by its growth potential and pleased to find that the dry air relieved his bronchitis. He resolved to settle there and did so one year later, bringing his reluctant wife and his children, who arrived by train June 10, 1895. Within ten days of their arrival, Rutherford had opened a law office, purchased four lots of land, and contracted local builder Hugh McCurdy to build him a house. In July, the family moved into their new four-room single-storey house. In 1896 Rutherford became the town's only lawyer, as his competition, Mervyn Mackenzie, had moved to Toronto.

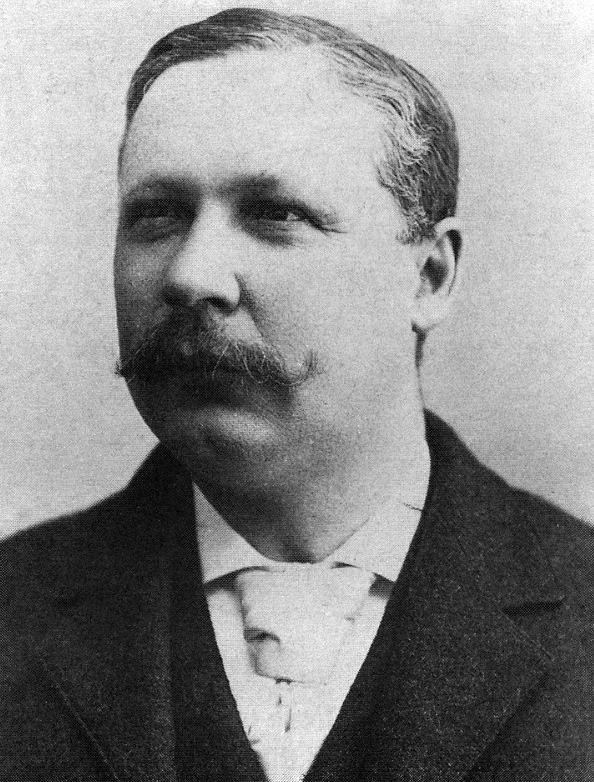
Rutherford around the time of his move West

Rutherford quickly became deeply involved in the community. Among the roles he acquired during his first three years in the District of Alberta were president of the newly formed South Edmonton Football Club, secretary-treasurer of the South Edmonton School Board, president of the South Edmonton Athletic Association, vice president of the South Edmonton Literary Institute, auditor of the South Edmonton Agricultural Society, and secretary of the Edmonton District Butter and Cheese Manufacturing Association. He was also the first master of the Acacia Lodge, Ancient Free and Accepted Masons, and had previously served as the master of the Mount Zion Lodge in Kemptville. Rutherford also became involved in the provincial autonomy movement for the North-West Territories in 1896. He was an early advocate for the incorporation of South Edmonton, hitherto an unincorporated community. When incorporation came in 1899, as the Town of Strathcona, Rutherford became the new town's secretary-treasurer after he had acted as returning officer in its first election.

Throughout that period, he practised law, from 1899 with Frederick C. Jamieson, who later was elected as a Conservative member of the Legislative Assembly of Alberta. He employed single women as secretaries in an era that clerical workers were predominantly male, and he defended a First Nations person accused of murder when most lawyers refused such cases. As their practice grew, he and Jamieson also engaged in moneylending. Besides his law practice, Rutherford was a successful real estate investor, and he also owned an interest in gold mining equipment on the North Saskatchewan River. Several parks and neighbourhoods in the city, including Bonnie Doon (originally spelt "Bonnie Doone"), were created from land owned by Rutherford.

=== Early political career ===
In 1896, Frank Oliver, who had represented Edmonton in the Legislative Assembly of the North-West Territories since 1888, resigned to pursue a career in federal politics. Several Strathcona residents urged Rutherford to run for Oliver's old seat in the ensuing by-election. Though he was originally reluctant, he agreed to stand after a 300-signature petition urging his candidacy was presented to him. His only opponent was a former mayor of Edmonton, Matthew McCauley, who, like Rutherford, ran as an independent. Rutherford campaigned on a platform of improved roads, resource development, simplification of territorial ordinances, and (in what would become a theme of his political career) increased educational funding. McCauley won the election, but Rutherford received more than forty per cent of the vote.

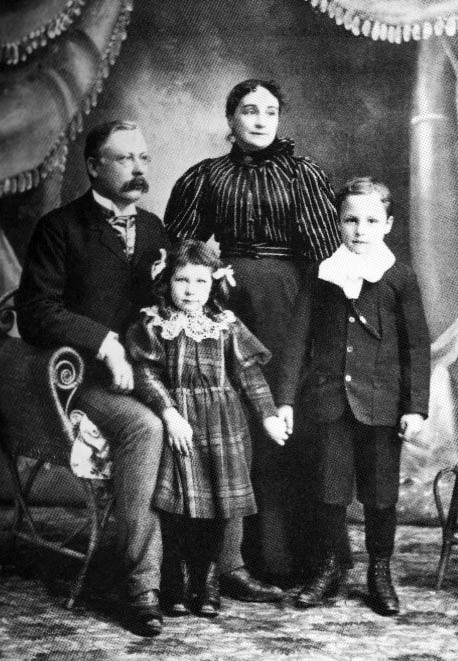
The Rutherford family in 1898

During the 1898 territorial election, Rutherford again challenged the now-incumbent McCauley. His defeat of two years previous still fresh in his mind, his platform this time included a call for a redrawing of the territory's electoral boundaries. He believed that the current Edmonton riding was gerrymandered in McCauley's favour. He also repeated his past calls for improved roads and advocated increased taxation on the railroads. He pledged "independent support" for the nonpartisan administration of Premier Frederick Haultain, and he supported that administration's call for the creation of a single province in the southern part of NWT following the 1901 census. Rutherford criticized McCauley's past record, accusing him of silence on issues that were of concern to his constituents. Despite this, McCauley won again but by a reduced margin.

Rutherford was at last successful in the 1902 election, when he ran in the newly created riding of Strathcona. His 1902 platform was similar to his 1898 platform and supported Haultain, but he now supported a two-province division of the southern part of the North-West Territories, rather than Haultain's preferred one-province approach, on the grounds that a single province covering all the western prairies would be so large as to be ungovernable. It at first looked as though he would run unopposed; however, at the last minute, local lawyer Nelson D. Mills, a prominent Conservative, publicly accused Rutherford of being not a true independent, but a dyed-in-the-wool Haultain supporter, and announced that he would run against him. Rutherford was supported by most of Strathcona's most prominent residents, including his law partner Jamieson and his future rival John R. Boyle, and won an easy victory.

Rutherford served in the Legislative Assembly of the North-West Territories until Alberta became a province in 1905. During his tenure, he was elected deputy speaker and sat on standing committees for libraries, municipal law, and education. His legislative efforts included successful attempts to extend the boundaries of the Town of Strathcona and to empower it to borrow for construction of public works. He was considered a possible member of Haultain's executive council, likely in the post of Commissioner of Public Works, but the post instead went to George Bulyea. He joined many of his fellow MLAs in continuing to advocate for provincial status, finding that the limitations on a territory's means to raise revenue prevented the North-West Territories from meeting its obligations.

Though Rutherford supported Haultain's vision of nonpartisan territorial administration, federally he was an avowed Liberal. In 1900, he was elected president of the Strathcona Liberal association and was a delegate to the convention that nominated Oliver as the party's candidate in Alberta for the 1900 federal election. He subsequently campaigned for Oliver in his successful re-election attempt. When the federal riding of Strathcona was formed in advance of the 1904 election, Rutherford was urged to accept the Liberal nomination but demurred. Peter Talbot was selected instead and, supported by Rutherford, was elected.

=== Selection as premier ===
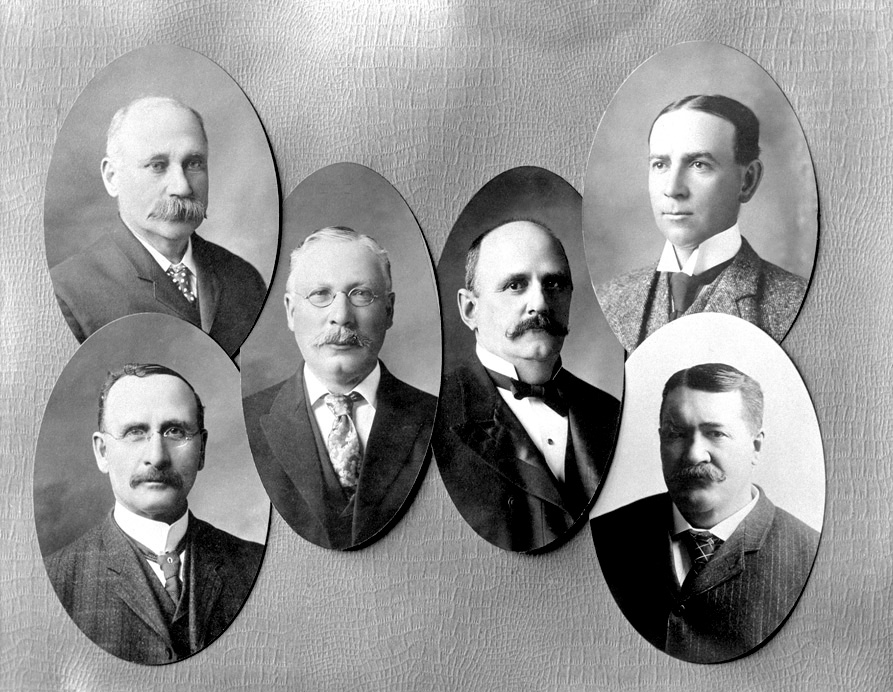
Rutherford and his cabinet

In February 1905, the federal government of Prime Minister Sir Wilfrid Laurier introduced legislation to create two new provinces (Alberta and Saskatchewan) out of part of the North-West Territories. Though Haultain wanted the new provinces to be governed on the same nonpartisan basis as the Territories had been, the Liberal Laurier was expected to recommend a Liberal to serve as Lieutenant-Governor, and the Lieutenant-Governor was expected to call on a Liberal to form the new province's first government. Oliver was the province's most prominent Liberal, but he had just been named federal Minister of the Interior and was not interested in leaving Ottawa. Talbot was Laurier's preferred candidate, but he expected to be appointed to the Senate and found the latter prospect more congenial than serving as Premier of Alberta. Both men supported Rutherford, but neither was enthusiastic about doing so. In August, Bulyea was appointed Alberta's first Lieutenant-Governor and later that month the Alberta Liberals selected Rutherford as their first leader.

A final barrier was removed a few days later, when Haultain, who was a Conservative federally but who was thought to be a potential leader of a coalition government, announced that he would stay in Regina to lead the Saskatchewan Conservatives. On September 2, Bulyea asked Rutherford to form the first government of Alberta.

After accepting the position of premier, Rutherford selected a geographically diverse cabinet on September 6: Edmonton's Charles Wilson Cross as Attorney-General, Calgary's William Henry Cushing as Minister of Public Works, Medicine Hat's William Finlay as Minister of Agriculture and Provincial Secretary, and Lethbridge's George DeVeber as Minister without Portfolio. Rutherford kept for himself the positions of Provincial Treasurer and Minister of Education.

== Premier ==
=== 1905 election ===
Rutherford was now premier but had not yet faced the people in an election and did not yet have a legislature to which he could propose legislation. Elections for the first Legislative Assembly of Alberta were accordingly fixed for November 9. The Conservatives, the young province's only other political party, had already selected R. B. Bennett as their leader. Bennett attacked the terms under which Alberta had been made a province, especially the clauses that left control of its lands and natural resources in the hands of the federal government and required the continued provincial funding of separate schools. He pointed out that Canada's older provinces had control of their own natural resources and that education was a provincial responsibility under the British North America Act. The Liberals responded to such criticisms by highlighting the financial compensation the province received from the federal government in exchange for control of its natural resources, which amounted to $375,000 per year. They further suggested that the Conservatives' concern for control of lands to be caused by desire to make favourable land concessions to the unpopular Canadian Pacific Railway, which had long been friendly with the Conservatives and for which Bennett had acted as solicitor.

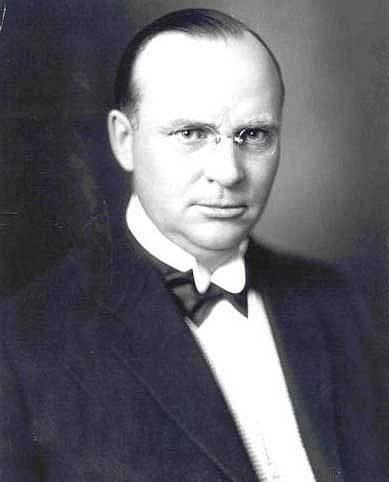
Conservative leader R. B. Bennett was Rutherford's opponent in the 1905 election.

Besides the Conservatives' ties to the CPR, Rutherford's Liberals enjoyed the incumbent's advantage of controlling the levers of patronage, and the election's result was never really in doubt. Before the election, Talbot predicted that the government would win 18 of the province's 25 seats. Immediately after the election, it appeared that the Liberals had won 21. When all the votes had been counted, the Liberals won 23 seats to the Conservatives' two. Bennett himself was defeated in his Calgary riding. When the outcome was clear, the people of Strathcona feted Rutherford with a torchlight procession and bonfire.

=== First legislature and regional tensions ===
One of the most contentious issues facing the newly elected government was the decision of the province's capital city. The federal legislation creating the province had fixed Edmonton as the provisional capital, much to the chagrin of Calgary. Neither party had taken a position on the divisive question during the campaign, but selecting a permanent capital was high on the list of the new legislature's orders of business. Calgary's case was made most enthusiastically by Minister of Public Works Cushing, Edmonton's by Attorney-General Cross. Banff and Red Deer were also possibilities, but motions to select each failed to find seconders. In the end, Edmonton was designated by a vote of sixteen members, including Rutherford, to eight.

Rutherford personally prioritized the establishment of a provincial university. Though the Edmonton Bulletin opined that it would be unfair "that the people of the Province should be taxed for the special benefit of four per cent that they may be able to attach the cognomen of B.A. or M.A. to their names and flaunt the vanity of such over the taxpayer, who has to pay for it," Rutherford proceeded quickly. He was concerned that delay might result in the creation of denominational colleges, striking a blow to his dream of a high-quality nonsectarian system of postsecondary education in the province. The legislature passed a bill establishing the university but left the location still undecided. Many in Calgary felt that having lost the fight to be provincial capital, it could expect the university to be established there, and it was not pleased when, a year late the government announced the founding of the University of Alberta in Rutherford's hometown, Strathcona.

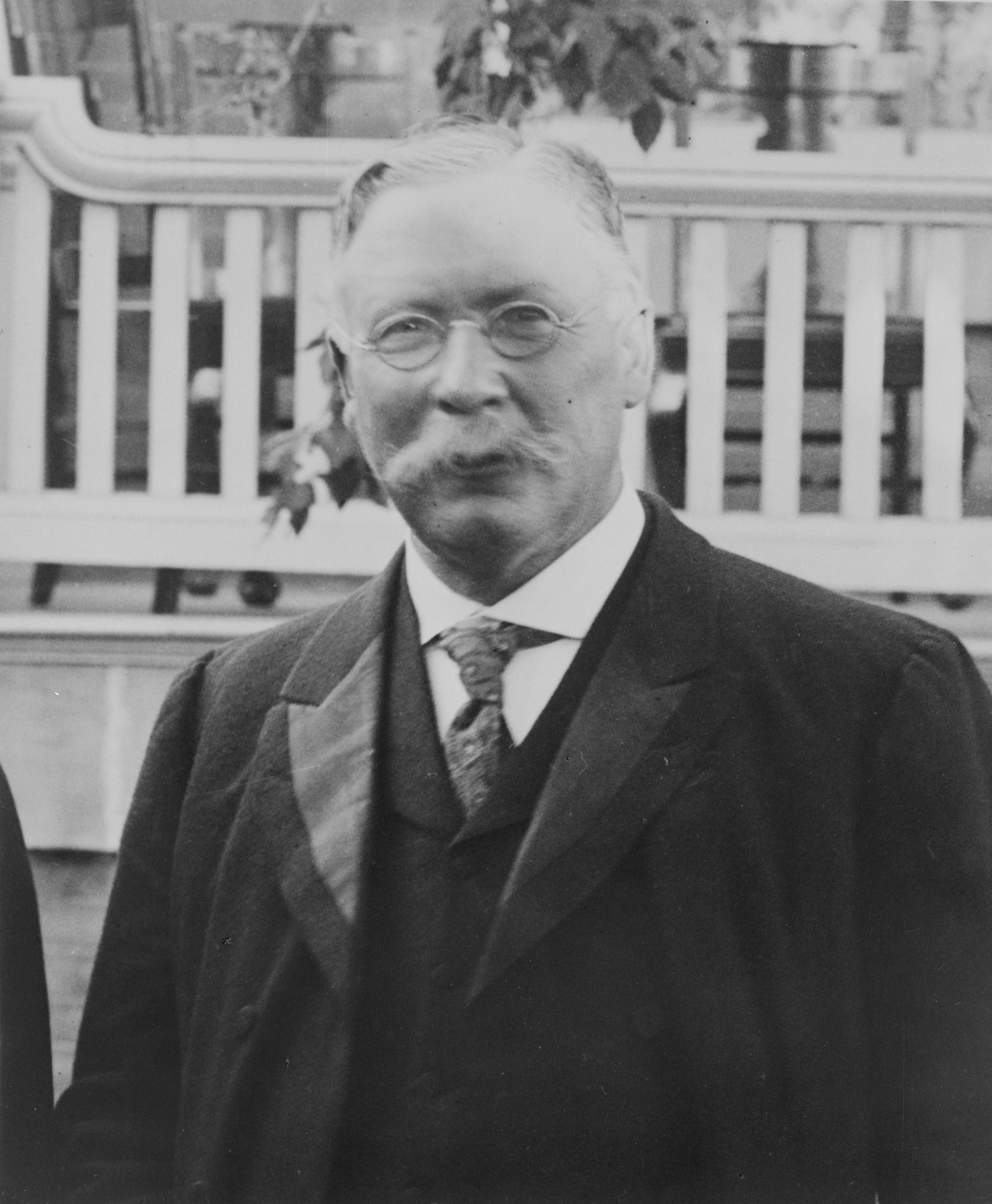
Rutherford as Premier

While the regionally charged issues attracted much attention, the government also successfully pursued other initiatives during the legislature's first session. It set up a court system, with Arthur Lewis Sifton as the province's first Chief Justice. In 1906, it passed a series of acts dealing with the organization and administration of the new provincial government and incorporated the cities of Lethbridge, Medicine Hat, and Wetaskiwin. It also established a speed limit of 20 miles per hour (32 km/h) for motorized vehicles and set up a regime for mine inspection.

Though the founding of the University of Alberta was the centrepiece of Rutherford's educational policy, his activity as Minister of Education extended well beyond it. In the first year of Alberta's existence, 140 new schools were established, and a normal school was set up in Calgary to train teachers. Rutherford put great emphasis on the creation of English-language schools in the large portions of the province that were occupied primarily by Central and Eastern European immigrants. The immigrants themselves were often unable to speak English, and the provision of these schools for their children was a major factor in their rapid assimilation into Albertan society. They were also in lieu of separate religious schools for groups such as Mennonites. While the continued existence of Roman Catholic separate schools was mandated by the terms of Alberta's admission into Confederation, the government's policy was otherwise to encourage a unified and secular public school system. Rutherford also introduced new school books made freely available to pupils in the province. To address the lack of distinct Western Canadian content, The Provinces of Alberta and Saskatchewan partnered with the Morang Educational Company of Toronto in 1908 to produce Alexandra Series of Readers, which had more western Canadian content than the older texts inherited from the NWT government. Some criticized Rutherford's government for the decision to work with a Toronto publisher, which printed the books in New York, rather than locally or in Canada at least. Rutherford defended the decision in a pamphlet, one of a series of handbills that established communications between the government and Alberta voters, saying that the books were high quality, the cost to the government was low, and the books were printed in Union shops.

=== Labour unrest ===
The winter of 1906–07 was the coldest in Alberta's history and was exacerbated by a shortage of coal. One cause of this shortage was the strained relationship between coal miners and mine operators in the province. At the beginning of April 1907, the Canada West Coal and Coke Company locked out the miners from its mine near Taber. The same company was also facing a work stoppage at its mine in the Crow's Nest Pass, where miners were refusing to sign a new contract. The problem spread until by April 22, all 3,400 miners working for member-companies of the Western Coal Operators' Association were off work. Miners' demands included increased wages, a reduction in working hours to eight per day (from ten), the posting of mine inspection reports, the isolated storage of explosives, the use of non-freezing explosives, and semi-monthly rather than monthly pay. The mine operators objected to this last point on the basis that since many miners did not report to work the day after payday, it desirable to keep paydays to a minimum.

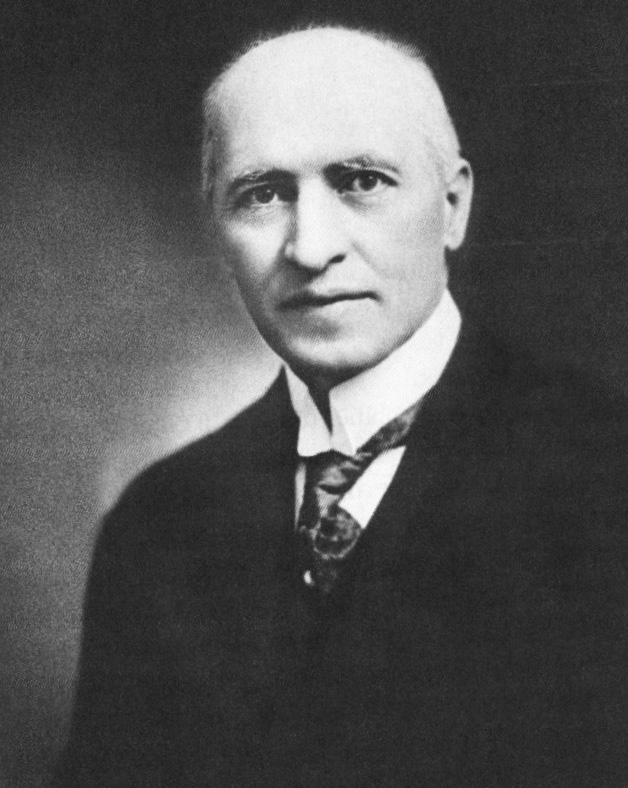
Arthur Sifton chaired the commission inquiring into conditions in Alberta's coal mines and later succeeded Rutherford as Premier.

Rutherford's government appointed a commission in February, but it was not until May that it met. It consisted of Chief Justice Arthur Sifton, mining executive Lewis Stockett, and miners' union executive William Haysom. It began taking evidence in July. In the meantime, a May agreement saw most miners return to work at increased rates of pay. Coal supply promptly increased, as did its price. In August, the commission released its recommendations, which included a prohibition on children under 16 working in mines, the posting of inspectors' reports, mandatory bath houses at mine sites, and improved ventilation inspection. It also recommended for Albertans to keep a supply of coal on hand during the summer for winter use. The commission was silent on wages (other than to say that these should not be fixed by legislation), the operation of company stores (a sore point among the miners), and the incorporation of miners' unions, which was recommended by mine management but opposed by the unions.

The committee also made no recommendation about working hours, but Rutherford's government legislated an eight-hour day anyway. As well, Rutherford's government also passed workers' compensation legislation designed to make such compensation automatic, rather than requiring the injured worker to sue his employer. Labour representatives criticized the bill for failing to impose fines on negligent employers, for limiting construction workers' eligibility under the program to injuries sustained while they were working on buildings more than 40 feet (12 m) high, and for exempting casual labourers. It also viewed the maximum payout of $1,500 as inadequate. In response to these concerns, the maximum was increased to $1,800 and the minimum building height reduced to 30 feet (9.1 m). In response to farmers' concerns, farm labourers were made exempt from the bill entirely.

Rutherford's relationship with organized labour was never easy. Historian L.G. Thomas argued that there was little indication that Rutherford had any interest in courting the labour vote. In 1908, Labour candidate Donald McNabb was elected in a Lethbridge by-election; the riding had previously been held by a Liberal. McNabb was the first Labour MLA elected in Alberta (he was defeated in his 1909 re-election bid).

=== Public works ===
Rutherford's Liberals self-identified as the party of free enterprise, in contrast to the Conservatives, who supported public ownership Still the Liberals made a limited number of large-scale forays into government operation of utilities, the most notable of which being the creation of Alberta Government Telephones. In 1906, Alberta's municipalities legislation was passed and included a provision authorizing municipalities to operate telephone companies. Several, including Edmonton, did so, alongside private companies. The largest private company was the Bell Telephone Company, which held a monopoly over service in Calgary. Such monopolies and the private firms' refusal to extend their services into sparsely-populated and unprofitable rural areas aroused demand for provincial entry into the market, which was effected in 1907. The government constructed a number of lines, beginning with one between Calgary and Banff, and it also purchased Bell's lines for $675,000.

Alberta's public telephone system was financed by debt, which was unusual for a government like Rutherford's, which was generally committed to the principle of "pay as you go". Rutherford's stated rationale was that the cost of such a large capital project should not.be borne by a single generation and that incurring debt to finance a corresponding asset was, in contrast to operating deficits, acceptable. Though the move was popular at the time, it would prove not to be financially astute. By focusing on areas neglected by existing companies, the government was entering into the most expensive and least profitable fields of telecommunication. Such problems would not come to fruition until Rutherford had left office, however. In the short term, the government's involvement in the telephone business helped it to a sweeping victory in the 1909 election. The Liberals won 37 of 41 seats in the newly expanded legislature.

Of equal profile was Rutherford's government's management of the province's railways. Alberta's early years were optimistic and manifested itself in a pronounced enthusiasm for the construction of new railway lines. Every town wanted to be a railway centre, and the government had great confidence in the ability of the free market to provide low freight rates to the province's farmers if sufficient charters were issued to competing companies. The legislature passed government-sponsored legislation setting out a framework for new railways in 1907, but interest from private firms in actually building the lines was limited.

In the face of public demand and support by legislators of all parties for as rapid as possible an expansion of the province's lines, the government offered loan guarantees to several companies in exchange for commitments to build lines. Rutherford justified this in part by his conviction that railways needed to expand along with population, rather than have railway expansion follow population growth, which would be the case without government intervention. The Conservatives argued that the strategy did not go far enough, and they called for direct government ownership.

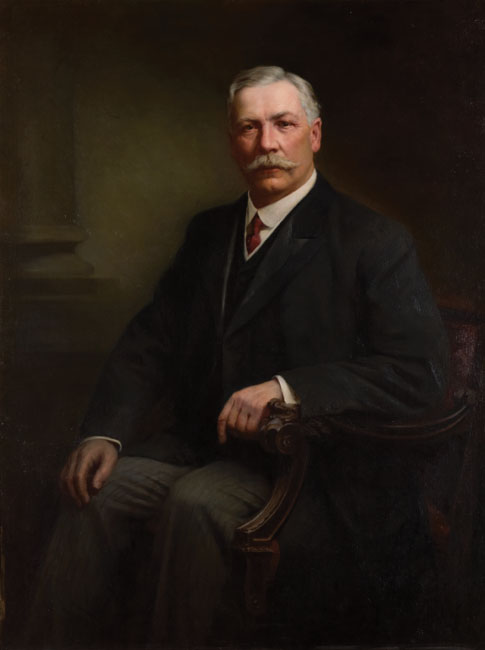
Rutherford's official portrait.

While most public works issues were handled by Public Works Minister Cushing, but after the 1909 election, Rutherford named himself as the province's first Minister of Railways.

=== Railway scandal ===
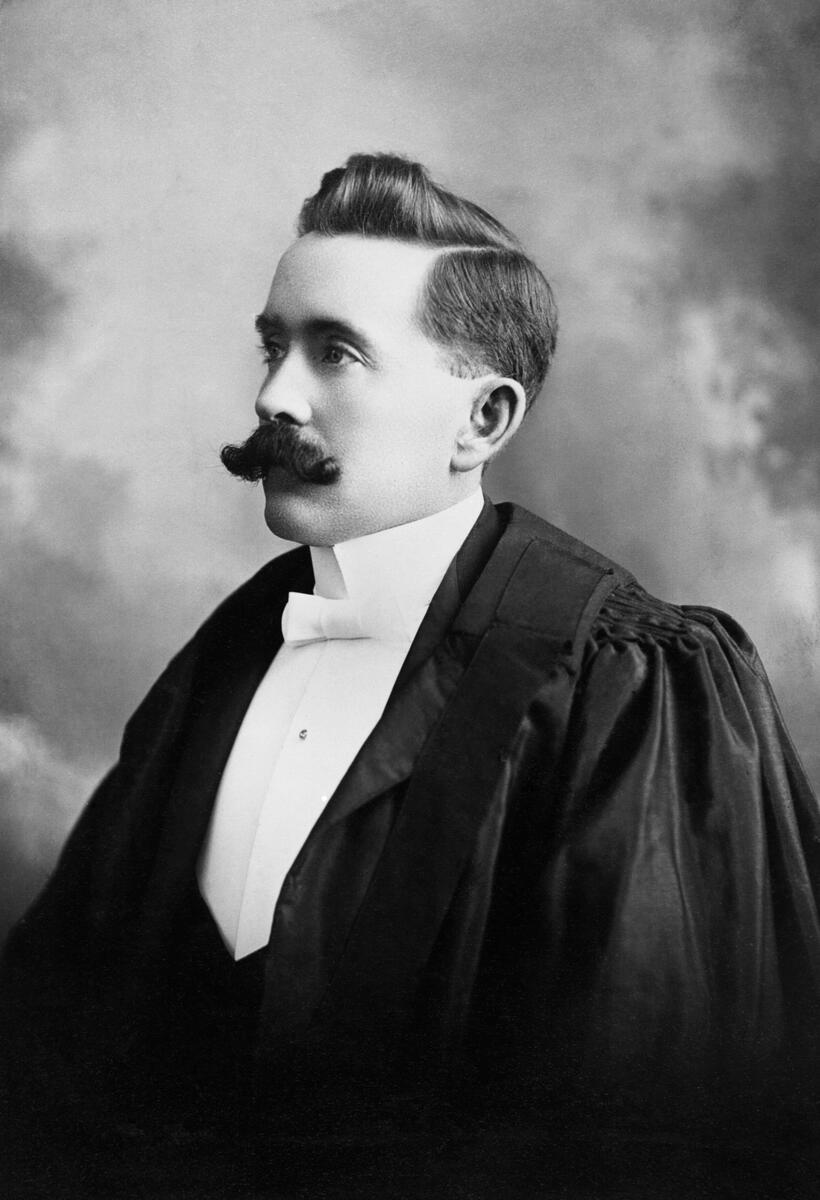
John R. Boyle led the dissident Liberals during the railway scandal.

When the legislature met for the first time after the 1909 election, things seemed to be going well for Rutherford and his government. He controlled a huge majority, albeit slightly reduced from the 1905 election, and enjoyed widespread popularity. His government had achieved significant success in setting up a new province, and success looked poised to continue. Early in this new legislative session, however, two signs of trouble appeared: Liberal backbencher John R. Boyle began to ask questions about the agreement between the government and the Alberta and Great Waterways Railway Company, and Cushing resigned from cabinet over his views of this same agreement.

The Alberta and Great Waterways Railway was one of several companies that had been granted charters and assistance by the legislature to build new railways in the province. The government support that it received was more generous than that received by the more established railways, such as the Grand Trunk Pacific Railway and the Canadian Northern Railway. Boyle, Cushing, and Bennett alleged favouritism or ineptitude by Rutherford and his government, and they pointed to the sale of government-guaranteed bonds in support of the company as further evidence. Because of the high interest rate they paid, the bonds were sold at above par value, but the government received only par for them and left the company to pocket the difference.

Boyle sponsored a motion of non-confidence against the government. Despite enjoying the support of twelve Liberals, including Cushing, the motion was defeated and the government upheld. Rutherford attempted to quell the controversy by calling a royal commission, but pressure from many Liberals, including Bulyea, led him to resign May 26, 1910. He was replaced by Arthur Sifton, hitherto the province's chief judge.

In November, the royal commission issued its report that found that the evidence did not show a conflict of interest on Rutherford's part, but the majority report was nevertheless highly critical of the former premier. A minority report was much kinder by avowing perfect satisfaction with Rutherford's version of events.

== Later life ==
=== Later political career ===
Before the 1911 federal election, several local Liberals opposed to Frank Oliver asked Rutherford to run against him in Strathcona. Relations between Oliver and Rutherford had always been chilly. Oliver was implacably opposed to Cross and viewed him as a rival for dominance of the Liberal Party in Alberta, and his Edmonton Bulletin had taken the side of the dissidents during the railway scandal. A nominating meeting unanimously nominated Rutherford as Liberal candidate, but Oliver refused to accept its legitimacy and awaited a later meeting. Before the meeting came to pass, however, Rutherford abruptly withdrew. Historian Douglas Babcock suggested that to be caused by the Conservatives' nomination of William Antrobus Griesbach, dashing Rutherford's hopes that his popularity among Conservatives would preclude them from opposing him. Rumours at the time alleged that Rutherford had been asked to make a personal contribution of $15,000 to his campaign fund and had balked. Rutherford himself cited a desire to avoid splitting the vote on reciprocity, which he and Oliver both favoured but Griesbach opposed. Whatever the reason for Rutherford's standing aloof from the election, Oliver was nominated as Liberal candidate and was re-elected.

After resigning as premier, Rutherford continued to sit as a Liberal MLA. He commanded the loyalty of many Liberals who had supported his government through the Alberta and Great Waterways issue, but the faction began increasingly to see Cross as its real leader. Rutherford opposed the Sifton government's decision to confiscate the Alberta and Great Waterways bond money and revoke its charter, and in 1913, he was one of only two Liberals to support a non-confidence motion against the government (Cross had by now joined the Sifton cabinet, which placated most members of the Cross-Rutherford faction.

In the 1913 election, Rutherford was again nominated as the Liberal candidate in Edmonton South (Strathcona had been amalgamated into Edmonton in 1912), despite pledging opposition to the Sifton government and offering to campaign around the province for the Conservatives if they agreed not to run a candidate against him. At the nomination meeting, he stated that he was "not running as a Sifton candidate" and was "a good independent candidate ... and a good Liberal too". Despite his opposition to the government, Conservatives declined his offer of support and nominated Herbert Crawford to run against him. After a vigorous campaign, Crawford defeated Rutherford by fewer than 250 votes. Cross lobbied Prime Minister Laurier for Rutherford to be appointed to the Senate. He was unsuccessful, but Rutherford was made King's Counsel shortly after his electoral defeat.

Rutherford took a strong line against the Sifton government and was nominated as Conservative candidate for the 1917 provincial election but stood down after being named as Alberta director of the National Service (conscription). (EB, November 6, 1916)

In the 1921 Alberta general election, he campaigned actively for the Conservatives, including for Crawford, who had defeated him eight years earlier. Rutherford continued to call himself a Liberal but criticized the incumbent administration for the growth of the provincial debt and for letting the party fall into disarray. Calling the Charles Stewart government "rotten" and holding a grudge against cabinet minister John R. Boyle in particular, he offered voters the slogan "get rid of the barnacles and the Boyles", a homonymic reference to the parasitic growth on the side of a ship. He may have been thrilled to see the Liberal government fall in the election but probably less so when he saw that the triumphant United Farmers of Alberta had also whittled the Conservatives down to only one seat.

=== Professional career ===
Once out of politics, Rutherford returned to his law practice. His partnership with Jamieson saw partners come and go. Rutherford divided his time between the original Strathcona office and the Edmonton office that he opened in 1910. His practice focused on contracts, real estate, wills and estates, and incorporations. In 1923, Rutherford's son Cecil joined the firm, along with Stanley Harwood McCuaig, who, in 1919, would marry Rutherford's daughter Hazel. In 1925, Jamieson left the partnership to establish his own firm. In 1939, McCuaig did the same. Cecil's partnership with his father continued until the latter's death.

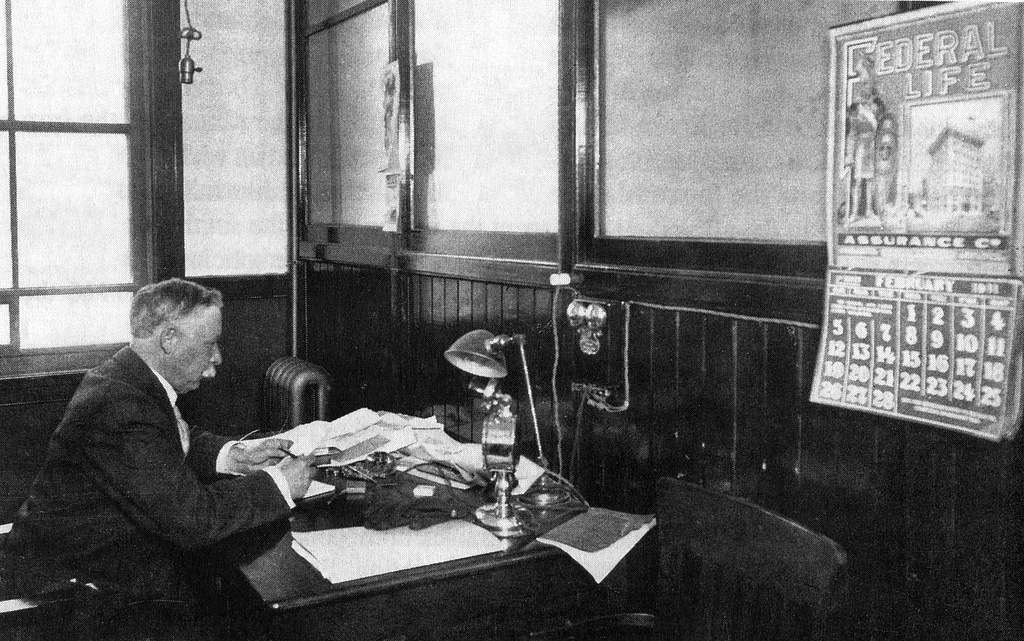
Rutherford in his law office, 1911

Besides his work as a lawyer, Alexander Rutherford was involved in a number of business enterprises. He was President of the Edmonton Mortgage Corporation and Vice President and solicitor of the Great Western Garment Company. The latter enterprise, which Rutherford co-founded, was a great success: established in 1911 with eight seamstresses, it had quadrupled in size within a year. During the Second World War, it made military uniforms and was reputed to be the largest garment operation in the British Empire. It was acquired by Levi Strauss & Co. in 1961 but continued to manufacture garments in Edmonton until 2004.

Rutherford also acted as director of the Canada National Fire Insurance Company, the Imperial Canadian Trust Company, the Great West Permanent Loan Company, and the Monarch Life Assurance Company.

=== University of Alberta ===
Education was a personal priority of Rutherford, as evidenced by his retention of the office of Education Minister for his entire time as Premier and by his enthusiastic work in founding the University of Alberta. In March 1911, he was elected by Alberta's university graduates to the University of Alberta Senate, responsible for the institution's academic affairs. In 1912, he established the Rutherford Gold Medal in English for the senior year honours English student with the highest standing; the prize still exists today as the Rutherford Memorial Medal in English. In 1912, with the university's first graduating class, Rutherford instituted a tradition of inviting convocating students to his house for tea; this tradition would last for 26 years.

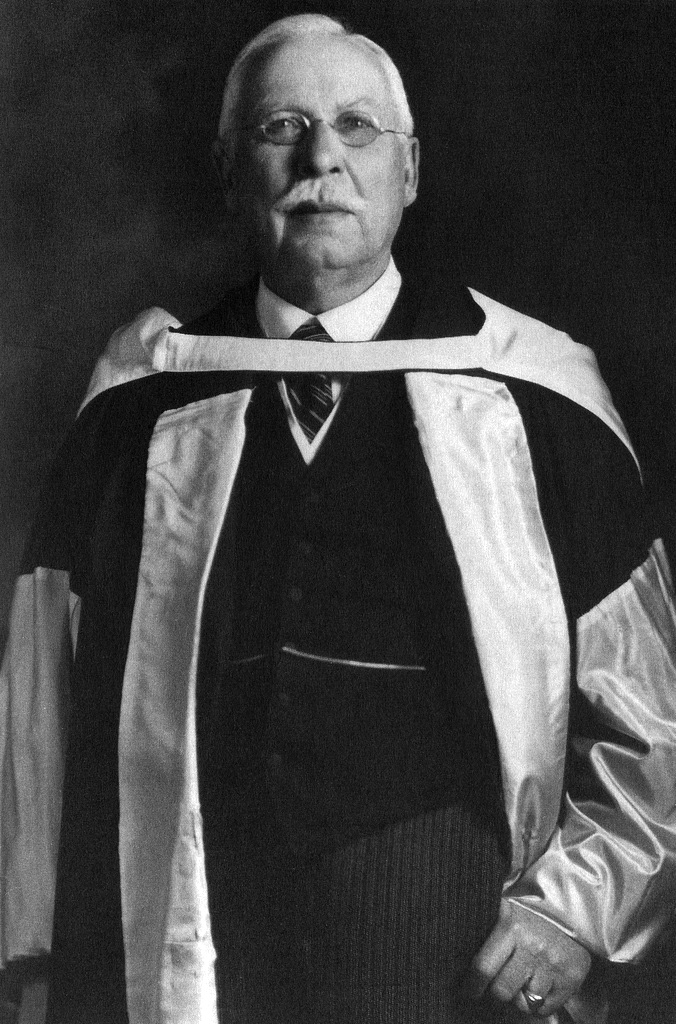
Rutherford in his Chancellor's robes

Convocation was not the only reason that students visited Rutherford's home. He had a wealth of both knowledge and books on Canadian subjects and welcomed students to consult his private library. The library eventually expanded beyond the room in his mansion devoted to it, to encompass the house's den, maid's sitting room, and garage as well. After his death, the collection was donated and sold to the university's library system; it was described in 1967 as "still the most important rare collection in the library".

Rutherford remained on the university's senate until 1927, when he was elected Chancellor. The position was the titular head of the university, and its primary duty was presiding over convocations. According to Rutherford biographer Douglas Babcock, it was the honour that Rutherford prized most. He was acclaimed to the position every four years until his death. It has been estimated that he awarded degrees to more than five thousand students. His final convocation, however, was marred by controversy. It 1941, a committee of the university senate recommended awarding an honorary degree to Premier William Aberhart. Aberhart was pleased and happily accepted University President William Alexander Robb Kerr's invitation to deliver the commencement address at convocation. However, a week prior to convocation the full senate, responsible for all university academic affairs, met, and voted against awarding Aberhart a degree. Aberhart rescinded his acceptance of Kerr's invitation and later removed the senate's authority except, ironically, the authority to award honorary degrees and Kerr resigned in protest. Rutherford was mortified but presided over convocation nonetheless.

=== Community involvement and family life ===
Rutherford remained active in a wide range of community organizations well after his departure from politics. He was a deacon in his church until well into his dotage, was a member of the Young Women's Christian Association advisory board from 1913 until his death, was Edmonton's first exalted ruler of the Benevolent and Protective Order of Elks, and was for three years the grand exalted ruler of the Elk Order of Canada.

During World War I, he was Alberta director of the National Service Commission, which oversaw conscription from 1916 until 1918. Alongside John Alexander McDougall, Frank Oliver, Colonel E. B. Edwards, and several other prominent Edmonton residents of Scottish descent, Rutherford helped form the 194th Highland Battalion of the Canadian Expeditionary Force. In 1916, he was appointed Honorary Colonel of the battalion. Rutherford served on the Loan Advisory Committee of the Soldier Settlement Board after the war, was President of the Alberta Historical Society (which had been created by his government) from 1919 to his death, was elected President of the McGill University Alumni Association of Alberta in 1922, and spent the last years of his life as honorary president of the Canadian Authors Association. He was also a member of the Northern Alberta Pioneers and Old-Timers Association, the British Association for the Advancement of Science, the Royal Colonial Institute of London, and an active Mason.

He continued to play curling and tennis into his late fifties, and he took up golf at the age of sixty-four, becoming a charter member of the Mayfair Golf and Country Club.

In 1902, Rutherford obtained a lease for Lot 15 of Block B in Banff, Alberta for $15 per annum. In the spring of 1908, he hired J. Luckett to build his family a summer cottage on the lot. The cottage was a small eight-roomed cabin and water for the singular sink was provided via pipes from the Bow River. The cabin was not only for the use of the Rutherford family, but also family, friends, and faculty from the University of Alberta. The cabin was sold in December 1916 to Walter Huckvale, a wealthy rancher and politician, from Medicine Hat.

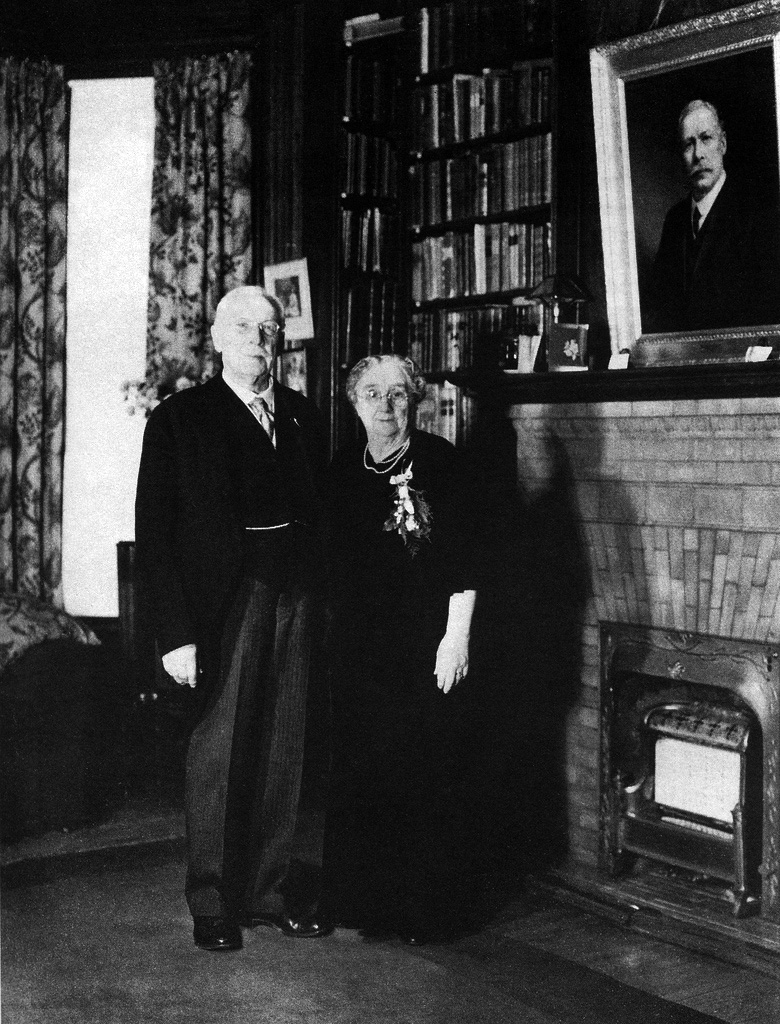
Alexander Rutherford and Mattie Rutherford on their fiftieth wedding anniversary, December 19, 1938

In 1911, the Rutherfords built a new house adjacent to the University of Alberta campus. Rutherford named it "Archnacarry", after his ancestral homeland in Scotland. Now known as Rutherford House, it serves as a museum. He made several trips to the United Kingdom and was invited to attend the coronation of King George VI and Queen Elizabeth, but he had to return to Canada before the event. On December 19, 1938, the Rutherfords celebrated their fiftieth wedding anniversary; tributes and well wishes arrived from across Canada.

=== Death and legacy ===
Besides his bronchitis, Rutherford developed diabetes in later years. His wife monitored his sugar intake, but when they were apart, Rutherford sometimes took less care than she would have liked him to. In 1938, possibly as a result of diabetes, he suffered a stroke that left him paralyzed and mute. He learned to walk again and, with the help of a grade 1 reader, got his speech back.

On September 13, 1940, Mattie Rutherford died of cancer. Less than a year later, June 11, 1941, Rutherford suffered a fatal heart attack while he was in hospital for insulin treatment. He was 84 years old. He was buried in Mount Pleasant Cemetery in Edmonton, alongside his family.

Rutherford's policy legacy is mixed. L. G. Thomas concludes that he was a weak leader, unable to dominate the ambitions of his lieutenants and with very little skill at debate. Still, Thomas recognizes the Rutherford government's legacy of province building.

Douglas Babcock suggests that Rutherford, while himself honourable, left himself at the mercy of unscrupulous men who ultimately ruined his political career. Bennett, Rutherford's rival and later Prime Minister, concurred with this assessment, calling Rutherford "a gentleman of the old school ... not equipped by experience or temperament for the rough and tumble of western politics".

There is general agreement that Rutherford's greatest legacy and the one in which he took the most pride lies in his contributions to Alberta's education. As Mount Royal College historian Patricia Roome concludes her chapter on Rutherford in a book about Alberta's first twelve premiers, "Rutherford's educational contribution remains his ultimate legacy to Albertans."

=== Honours and eponyms ===
Rutherford received many honours throughout his life, including four honorary doctorates of laws. In 1907, Rutherford received his first two honorary degrees from the University of Toronto and McMaster University, followed by one from the University of Alberta in 1908, and finally from McGill University in 1931. In 1935, he was awarded a King George V Silver Jubilee Medal. He was also awarded lifetime memberships to various organizations including the Order of Elks and Mayfair Golf Club.

His name was attached to many institutions both during his life and later in recognition of civil service and volunteer work. Rutherford Elementary School in Edmonton was established in 1911 on land formally owned by Rutherford. In 1951, the University of Alberta opened Rutherford Library, which included a substantial portion of Rutherford's personal collection, donated to the university following his death. The brick used to build the 1974 north wing addition of Rutherford Library is known as "Rutherford Autumn Leaf" and is registered in the building industry.

Several roads and parks in Edmonton are named in Rutherford's honour. In 1908, Rutherford Park (now part of Mill Creek Ravine) was established following a donation of 2.0 hectares (5 acres) of land to Strathcona for the purposes of establishing a public park. 91 Street in the Bonnie Doon neighbourhood in Edmonton was known as Rutherford Street prior to the amalgamation of Edmonton and Strathcona in February 1912. Rutherford Road, Alexander Rutherford Park, and the Rutherford neighbourhood in south Edmonton are also named in his honour. In 1954, a mountain in Jasper National Park was named Mount Rutherford.

In 1969, Rutherford's first home in Edmonton (formerly at 8715 104 Street) was spared from demolition and relocated to Fort Edmonton Park, where it was restored. Rutherford's cabin in Banff has also been restored and expanded by the Banff Bowstrings Foundation.

Several scholarships are also distributed in Rutherford's honour. In 1980, the government of Alberta created the Alexander Rutherford Scholarship, which awards more than $20 million annually to high school students selected on the basis of a minimum of a 75% average. The top ten students receiving Alexander Rutherford scholarships are recognized as Rutherford Scholars and are presented with an additional scholarship and plaque. In 1982, the University of Alberta instituted the Rutherford Award for Excellence in Undergraduate Teaching, which is designed to recognize publicly teaching excellence.

== Electoral record ==
=== As party leader ===
1909 Alberta provincial election
Party	Party leader	# of candidates	Seats			Popular vote		
Party	Party leader	# of candidates	1905	1909	% Change	#	%	% Change
Liberal	Alexander C. Rutherford	42	23	36	+63.8%	29,634	59.3%	+1.7%
Conservative	Albert Robertson	29	2	2	0%	15,848	31.7%	−5.4%
Independent		6	—	1	—	1,695	3.4%	−1.9%
Independent Liberal		2	—	1	—	1,311	2.6%	—
Socialist		2	—	1	—	1,302	2.6%	—
Labour	Donald McNabb	1	—	—	—	214	0.4%	—
Total		82	25	42	+64.0%	50,004	100%	
1905 Alberta provincial election
Party	Party leader	# of candidates	Seats			Popular vote		
Party	Party leader	# of candidates	Seats			#		%
Liberal	Alexander C. Rutherford	26		23		14,485		
Conservative	Richard Bennett	23	2			9,316		37.1%
Independent		7	—			1,336		5.3%
Labour		2	—			843		%
Total		56	25			25,163		100%

=== As MLA ===
1913 Alberta general election results (Edmonton South)		Turnout	
Conservative	Herbert Crawford	1,523	54.4%
Liberal	Alexander C. Rutherford	1,275	45.6%
1909 Alberta general election results (Strathcona)		Turnout	
Liberal	Alexander C. Rutherford	1,034	85.9%
Conservative	Rice Sheppard	173	14.1%
1905 Alberta general election results (Strathcona)		Turnout	
Liberal	Alexander C. Rutherford	625	67.1%
Conservative	Frank W. Crang	306	32.9%
1902 North-West Territories general election results (Strathcona)		Turnout	
	Alexander C. Rutherford	577	89.5%
	N.D. Mills	68	10.5%
1898 North-West Territories general election results (Edmonton)		Turnout	
	Matthew McCauley	582	48.8%
	Alexander C. Rutherford	498	41.8%
	Harry Havelock Robertson	112	9.4%
1896 by-election results (Edmonton)		Turnout	
	Matthew McCauley	567	58.6%
	Alexander C. Rutherford	400	41.4%

== See also ==
- List of McGill University people § Others
- List of Alberta provincial ministers
- List of University of Alberta honorary degree recipients
- List of premiers of Alberta
- List of premiers of Alberta by time in office
- List of chancellors of the University of Alberta
