= List of Northwest Territories general elections =

This is a list of territorial elections in the Northwest Territories, Canada, since 1870. The Northwest Territories operates on a consensus government using the First Past the Post electoral system. The territory does not presently recognize political parties.

The last election was held on November 14, 2023.

== Voting and consensus government ==
Northwest Territories elects members to the Legislative Assembly of the Northwest Territories under a non-partisan system known as consensus government. The election only decides who represents each district. The newly elected members of the assembly convene after the election to vote amongst themselves to decide which members become part of the Executive Council. This system of government has evolved in the Northwest Territories since 1870.

The voting method to elect members is the first-past-the-post electoral system. Voters under this system pick the top candidate by the number of votes cast regardless of the per cent of votes earned by a candidate. With a few historical exceptions all electoral districts in the Northwest Territories are represented by a single member. First Past the Post has been used since the first election in 1881. Elections NWT is the independent regulatory body in charge of overseeing elections.

== History of elections ==
The Northwest Territories has been through a number of distinct changes in how the territory is governed and how government has been selected. These changes have coincided with several major boundary changes since the Government of Canada acquired the territory in 1870. From 1870 to 1876 the North-West Territories was run by an interim government, first led by lieutenant-governor William McDougall, and a council appointed by Ottawa. This council was governed under the Temporary Government of Rupert's Land Act, 1869 and the Manitoba Act, 1870 The council itself sat in Manitoba and was made up of Members of the Manitoba Legislative Assembly.

In 1876 the Temporary Council was dissolved and a new council was appointed under the North-West Territories Act. Members could be elected to join the council if an area of 1,000 square miles (3,000 km^{2}) had 1,000 inhabitants. The first such electoral districts were created in 1881. According to the Act, when the council reached twenty members, it would gain control of territorial affairs from the crown. The Council achieved this requirement in 1886. The council was renamed to an assembly and was dissolved in 1888. Twelve elections to rotate and elect members to new districts were held during the period between 1876 and 1888.

Five general elections would occur between 1888 and 1905, as the territories underwent significant growth. In 1897 after an amendment to the North-West Territories Act, the territories experienced a short-lived period of partisan politics that led to the North-West Territories Liberal-Conservative Party being elected in the fourth and fifth elections until 1905. The government in this period was made of members from the populated regions in the south. No members from the Arctic region would sit in government until 1947. In 1905, Alberta and Saskatchewan were carved out of the North-West Territories. As a result, the population dropped from approx 160,000 to 17,000, of which 16,000 were aboriginal and had no right to vote under Canadian law. The government of the North-West Territories defaulted back to its 1870 constitutional status, and once again came under federal control. This period of the second council, which governed from Ottawa, lasted from 1905 to 1951.

In 1951, the second council was dissolved in order to return to elections. Rather than being fully elected body, the Councils and Assemblies were a mix of elected and appointed members. After 1975 the Assembly became fully elected. In 1999 the Northwest Territories underwent one last division as the territory of Nunavut was created out of the eastern half of the territory.

The boundary changes have resulted in a disconnect in four periods of the territorial government. The records of the temporary council falls under the archives of the Manitoba government, while the archives and electoral records of the period of government from 1876 to 1905 were retained by the Saskatchewan government. The archives of the council from 1905 to 1951 are under the Canadian Government who appointed the council from that period.

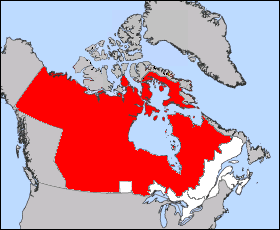
In 1870, N.W.T. covered much of Canada. The government was in the south part of the territory. A number of boundary changes would occur over the next 35 years but have little effect on the government until 1905.

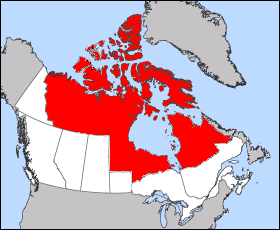
The N.W.T. boundary change in 1905 marked a major shift in the territorial government and demographics of the remaining population.

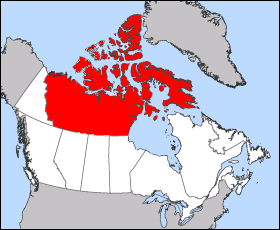
The government evolved again under the 1912 to 1999 boundaries. The issue of splitting the territory in half surfaced in the early 1960s.

The current Northwest Territories as of 1999 was decided by a series of plebiscites and capped over a decade of consultation, committee work and land claim agreements.

== List of elections ==
Date	General elections and By-elections prior to 1888	Assembly	# elected	Elected leaders	Capital city
Temporary North-West Council, no elections from 1870 to 1876				Appointed; Lieutenant Governor	Fort Garry
1st Council of the North-West Territories, no elections from 1876 to 1881				Appointed; Lieutenant Governor	Fort Livingstone
March 23, 1881	Lorne by-election (Note: Elections prior to 1888 were held 3 years from the last in each district, or upon creation by the Lieutenant Governor or vacancy.)	1st Council	1	Appointed; Lieutenant Governor	Battleford
May 29, 1883	Edmonton by-election	1st Council	1	Appointed; Lieutenant Governor	Battleford
June 5, 1883	Lorne by-election	1st Council	1	Appointed; Lieutenant Governor	Battleford
August 13, 1883	Moose Jaw by-election Regina by-election Qu'Appelle by-election	1st Council	3	Appointed; Lieutenant Governor	Battleford
August 31, 1883	Broadview by-election	1st Council	1	Appointed; Lieutenant Governor	Battleford
June 28, 1884	Calgary by-election Moose Mountain by-election	1st Council	2	Appointed; Lieutenant Governor	Regina
September 15, 1885	1885 election	1st Council	11	Appointed; Lieutenant Governor	Regina
July 8, 1886	Moose Mountain by-election	1st Council	1	Appointed; Lieutenant Governor	Regina
July 14, 1886	Calgary by-election	1st Council	2	Appointed; Lieutenant Governor	Regina
October 14, 1886	Qu'Appelle by-election	1st Council	1	Appointed; Lieutenant Governor	Regina
May 24, 1887	Qu'Appelle by-election	1st Council	2	Appointed; Lieutenant Governor	Regina
September 5, 1887	Macleod by-election	1st Council	1	Appointed; Lieutenant Governor	Regina
June 30, 1888	1st general election	1st N-W Assembly	22	Chairman: Robert Brett	Regina
November 7, 1891	2nd general election	2nd N-W Assembly	25	Chairman: Frederick Haultain	Regina
October 31, 1894	3rd general election	3rd N-W Assembly	28	Chairman: Frederick Haultain	Regina
November 4, 1898	4th general election (Note: The fourth and fifth general elections were the only general elections elected on party lines.)	4th N-W Assembly	Lib-Con. 7	Premier: Frederick Haultain; Opposition: Robert Brett	Regina
November 4, 1898	4th general election	4th N-W Assembly	Liberal 2	Premier: Frederick Haultain; Opposition: Robert Brett	Regina
November 4, 1898	4th general election	4th N-W Assembly	Ind. 18	Premier: Frederick Haultain; Opposition: Robert Brett	Regina
November 4, 1898	4th general election	4th N-W Assembly	Ind. Lib. 3	Premier: Frederick Haultain; Opposition: Robert Brett	Regina
November 4, 1898	4th general election	4th N-W Assembly	Ind. POI 1	Premier: Frederick Haultain; Opposition: Robert Brett	Regina
May 21, 1902	5th general election	5th N-W Assembly	Lib-Con. 21	Premier: Frederick Haultain; Opposition: Donald McDonald	Regina
May 21, 1902	5th general election	5th N-W Assembly	Liberal 7	Premier: Frederick Haultain; Opposition: Donald McDonald	Regina
May 21, 1902	5th general election	5th N-W Assembly	Ind. 6	Premier: Frederick Haultain; Opposition: Donald McDonald	Regina
May 21, 1902	5th general election	5th N-W Assembly	Ind. Lib. 1	Premier: Frederick Haultain; Opposition: Donald McDonald	Regina
September 1, 1905	Creation of Alberta and Saskatchewan				
2nd Council of the Northwest Territories, no elections 1905–1951				Appointed; Commissioner	Ottawa
September 17, 1951	6th general election	1st NWT Council	3	Appointed; Commissioner	Ottawa
September 7, 1954	7th general election	2nd NWT Council	4	Appointed; Commissioner	Ottawa
August 19, 1957	8th general election	3rd NWT Council	4	Appointed; Commissioner	Ottawa
September 19, 1960	9th general election	4th NWT Council	4	Appointed; Commissioner	Ottawa
March 31, 1964	10th general election	5th NWT Council	4	Appointed; Commissioner	Ottawa
July 4, 1967	11th general election	6th NWT Council	7	Appointed; Commissioner	Yellowknife
December 21, 1970	12th general election	7th NWT Council	10	Appointed; Commissioner	Yellowknife
March 10, 1975	13th general election	8th NWT Assembly	15	Appointed; Commissioner	Yellowknife
October 1, 1979	14th general election	9th NWT Assembly	22	Premier: George Braden	Yellowknife
November 21, 1983	15th general election	10th NWT Assembly	24	Premier: Richard Nerysoo	Yellowknife
October 5, 1987	16th general election	11th NWT Assembly	24	Premier: Dennis Patterson	Yellowknife
October 15, 1991	17th general election	12th NWT Assembly	24	Premier: Nellie Cournoyea	Yellowknife
October 16, 1995	18th general election	13th NWT Assembly	24	Premier: Don Morin	Yellowknife
April 1, 1999	Creation of Nunavut				Yellowknife
December 6, 1999	19th general election	14th NWT Assembly	19	Premier: Stephen Kakfwi	Yellowknife
November 24, 2003	20th general election	15th NWT Assembly	19	Premier: Joe Handley	Yellowknife
October 1, 2007	21st general election	16th NWT Assembly	19	Premier: Floyd Roland	Yellowknife
October 3, 2011	22nd general election	17th NWT Assembly	19	Premier: Bob McLeod	Yellowknife
November 23, 2015	23rd general election	18th NWT Assembly	19	Premier: Bob McLeod	Yellowknife
October 1, 2019	24th general election	19th NWT Assembly	19	Premier: Caroline Cochrane	Yellowknife
November 14, 2023	25th general election	20th NWT Assembly	19	Premier: R.J. Simpson	Yellowknife

== See also ==
- List of Alberta general elections
- List of Saskatchewan general elections
- List of Nunavut general elections
- List of Yukon general elections
- List of Northwest Territories Plebiscites
