= List of Northwest Territories Legislative Assemblies =

This is a list of the Northwest Territories Legislative Assemblies dates and legislative sessions from 1870–present. The current capital is Yellowknife since 1967. There have been twenty-eight legislatures since becoming a territory in 1870.

Assembly	Duration	General Election	Elected members	Appointed members	Notes
Temporary North-West Council	1870–1876	—	—	up to 18	Vacant until 28 December 1872. Council was legally required to have between 7 and 15 appointed members. Its initial sitting had 11 members and at times had up to 18.
1st Council of the North-West Territories; 9 sessions	1876–1888	—	14	6	Elected members won their seats in scattered by-elections and the 1885 elections. Elected members were from eight single-member ridings and three two-member ridings. Not all of the Territory was represented; elections were centred on the most populated areas.
1st North-West Legislative Assembly; 3 sessions	1888 – 10 October 1891	1888 election	22	3	Six members were elected in two-member ridings and 16 in single-member ridings, but they did not cover the entire Territory. This Assembly also had three judges appointed as members to be legal experts.
2nd North-West Legislative Assembly; 5 sessions	1891 – 1 October 1894	1891 election	26	—	Two members were elected in a two-member riding and the rest in single-member ridings, but they did not cover the entire Territory.
3rd North-West Legislative Assembly; 4 sessions	1894 – 13 October 1898	1894 election	29	—	All members were elected in single-member ridings, but they did not cover the entire Territory.
4th North-West Legislative Assembly; 4 sessions	1898 – 26 April 1902	1898 election	31	—	All members were elected in single-member ridings, but they did not cover the entire Territory. This was one of only two assemblies to use political parties.
5th North-West Legislative Assembly; 3 sessions	1902 – 31 August 1905	1902 election	35	—	All members were elected in single-member ridings, but they did not cover the entire Territory. This was one of only two assemblies to use political parties.
2nd Council of the Northwest Territories	1905–1951	—	—	up to 6	No council was appointed until 1921, but provisions existed in law for four council seats. The Northwest Territories was instead run by the Department of Mines and Resources Canada and no legislation under territorial jurisdiction was passed or updated in this period. Between 1921 and 1951 a council existed in Ottawa with up to six seats, including the Director of Mines and Resources. No resident of the Territory was appointed to the council until 1947.
1st Northwest Territories Legislative Council	1951–1954	1951 election	3	5	All three elected members were from District of Mackenzie.
2nd Northwest Territories Legislative Council	1954–1957	1954 election	4	5	Elected members were from four ridings all in the District of Mackenzie.
3rd Northwest Territories Legislative Council	1957–1961	1957 election	4	5	Elected members were from four ridings all in the District of Mackenzie.
4th Northwest Territories Legislative Council	1961–1964	1960 election	4	5	Elected members were from four ridings all in the District of Mackenzie.
5th Northwest Territories Legislative Council	1964–1967	1964 election	4	5	Elected members were from four ridings all in the District of Mackenzie.
6th Northwest Territories Legislative Council	1967–1970	1967 election	7	5	From this point on, every region in the Territory was part of a riding and every riding elected one representative.
7th Northwest Territories Legislative Council	1970–1975	1970 election	10	4	
8th Northwest Territories Legislative Assembly	1975–1979	1975 election	15	—	
9th Northwest Territories Legislative Assembly	1979–1983	1979 election	22	—	
10th Northwest Territories Legislative Assembly	1983–1987	1983 election	24	—	
11th Northwest Territories Legislative Assembly	1987–1991	1987 election	24	—	
12th Northwest Territories Legislative Assembly	1991–1995	1991 election	24	—	
13th Northwest Territories Legislative Assembly	1995–1999	1995 election	24	—	
14th Northwest Territories Legislative Assembly; 6 sessions	1999–2003	1999 election	19	—	This was the first election after Nunavut split from the Territory.
15th Northwest Territories Legislative Assembly; 6 sessions	2003–2007	2003 election	19	—	
16th Northwest Territories Legislative Assembly; 6 sessions	2007–2011	2007 election	19	—	
17th Northwest Territories Legislative Assembly; 5 sessions	2011–2015	2011 election	19	—	
18th Northwest Territories Legislative Assembly; 3 sessions	2015–2019	2015 election	19	—	
19th Northwest Territories Legislative Assembly; 2 sessions	2019–2023	2019 election	19	—	
20th Northwest Territories Legislative Assembly; 1 session	2023–present	2023 election	19	—	

== See also ==
- List of Northwest Territories general elections
- History of Northwest Territories capital cities

== Notes ==
1. No members sat in Council between 1870 and 1872 and 1905 – 1921.
2. Provisions existed for appointment from seven to fifteen members of the council in the Temporary Government of Rupert's Land Act.
