= History of the Northwest Territories =

The history of the Northwest Territories covers the period from thousands of years ago to the present day. Prior to European colonization, the lands that encompass present-day Northwest Territories were inhabited for millennia by several First Nations. European explorers and fur traders began to explore the region since the late-16th century. By the 17th century, the British laid claim to both the North-Western Territory and Rupert's Land; and granted the Hudson's Bay Company a commercial fur trade monopoly over the latter region.

After the Deed of Surrender was enacted on 23 June 1870, the United Kingdom transferred the North-Western Territory and Rupert's Land to the government of Canada, with most all of the newly transferred territory administered as the North-West Territories. The hyphen was later dropped after the passing of the Northwest Territories Act in 1906. The territory reached its largest size in 1880, after the British Arctic Territories were transferred from the United Kingdom to Canada, and incorporated into the North-West Territories. However, the size of the territory was reduced several times during the late 18th- and early 19th centuries. Major adjustments to the boundary of the territory during this period includes severing of its western portions to form the Yukon Territory in 1898, severing its south-western portions to form the provinces of Alberta and Saskatchewan in 1905, and transferring its remaining lands south of the 60th parallel north and the District of Ungava to the provinces of Manitoba, Ontario, and Quebec in 1912.

During the Cold War era, a number of responsibilities were devolved from the federal to territorial government, with the territory's capital transferred from Ottawa to Yellowknife in 1967. During the 20th century, the federal government entered into land claim negotiations with the Inuit Tapiriit Kanatami. The resulting land claim negotiations saw the eastern portions of the territory separated from the rest, forming the territory of Nunavut in 1999.

== Early history ==
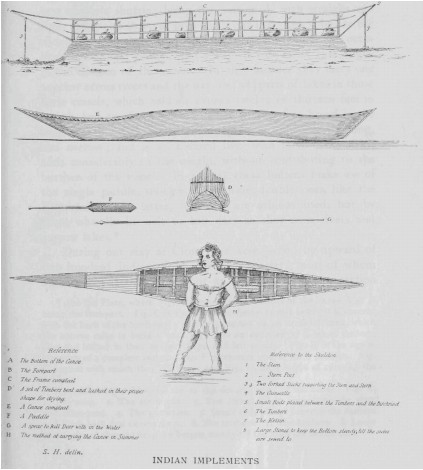
Illustration of canoe building at McArthur Lake from Samuel Hearne

Long before the Europeans arrived, Inuit and First Nations peoples inhabited the land area which became the Northwest Territories. Native Inuit included the Mackenzie, Copper, Caribou, and Central nations. There were also many nations when the Europeans first arrived, among them the Yellowknives, Chipewyan, Sekani, Beaver, Nahanni, Dogrib, and Slavey.

Martin Frobisher's expeditions in the 1570s were the first recorded visits to the Northwest Territories by a European. In 1610, Henry Hudson, while looking for the Northwest Passage, landed briefly on the western shore of the bay that bears his name. His discovery opened the interior of the continent to further exploration. Other early explorers include Luke Foxe, John Davis, Robert Bylot, Thomas Button, George Weymouth, Thomas James, and William Baffin.

=== Fur trade (17th– and 18th century) ===
In 1670, King Charles II granted a charter to the Governor and Company of Adventurers of England Trading into Hudsons Bay, known as the Hudson's Bay Company (HBC). It included the Hudson's Bay watershed.

By the 1700s, European trade in the North-West Territories was dominated by two fur-trading companies, the Hudson's Bay Company, based in London, England, and the North West Company based in Montréal. Fur trade explorer Peter Pond lead the way through the Methye Portage into the vast territory of the north-west where the rivers flowed north rather than east. In 1771, Samuel Hearne was the first European to reach the shore of the Arctic Ocean by an overland route via the Coppermine River. Further west and eighteen years later, in 1789, Alexander Mackenzie reached the Arctic Ocean. The river he navigated to get there now bears his name.

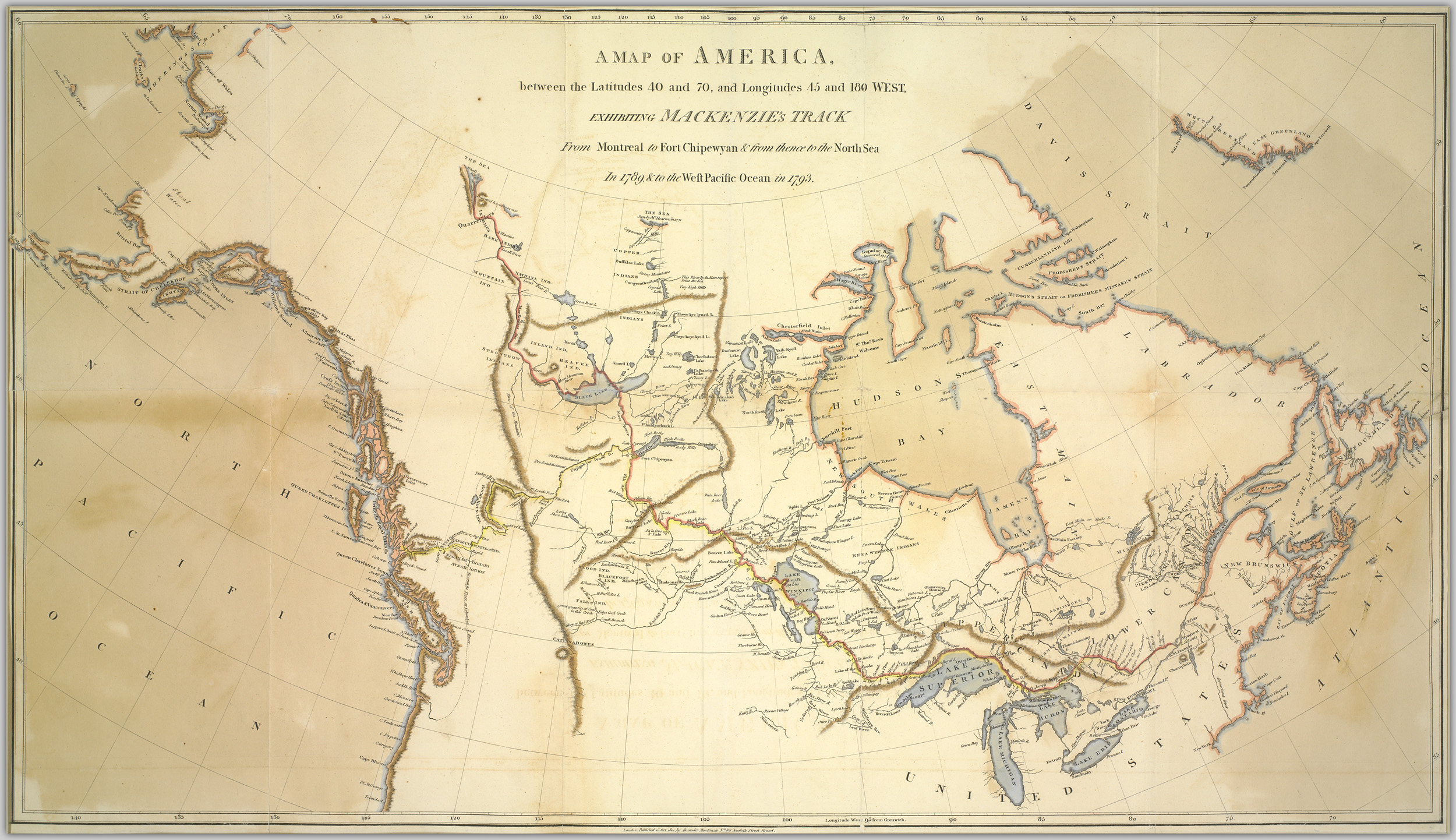
A map of North America exhibiting the route taken by Alexander MacKenzie's from Montreal to Fort Chipewyan, and finally the Arctic Ocean

York Factory later served as the Hudson's Bay Company's headquarters. The HBC depended on the furs coming to York Factory. The North West Company competed with the HBC by travelling throughout the territory obtaining furs as they did so. Some of these trader explorers kept journals and had them published. Public interest developed as a result.

As the Europeans increased their presence, they involved the First Nations as guides and suppliers of furs. The Chipewyan acted as middlemen. They brought to York Factory the furs of the western tribes. The Cree, Chipewyan, Beaver and Yellowknives obtained firearms. With this new advantage, they dominated their Athapaskan neighbours, i.e. the Slavey, Sekani, and Dogrib peoples.

=== 1800–1870 ===
In the early 1800s, perhaps 1810, the North West Company established a post at Tulita (Fort Norman) at the junction of the Mackenzie and Great Bear Rivers. The site changed several times but the community of Tulita is located on the original site today.

In 1821, the North West Company and the Hudson's Bay Company merged under the name of the latter. By 1825, Sir George Simpson advanced from the junior governor in charge of the company's Northern Department to be the head of this new company. Simpson travelled throughout the north-west. For forty years he led the company. For most of that time, he made at least one major journey by canoe every year.

==== Exploration expeditions ====
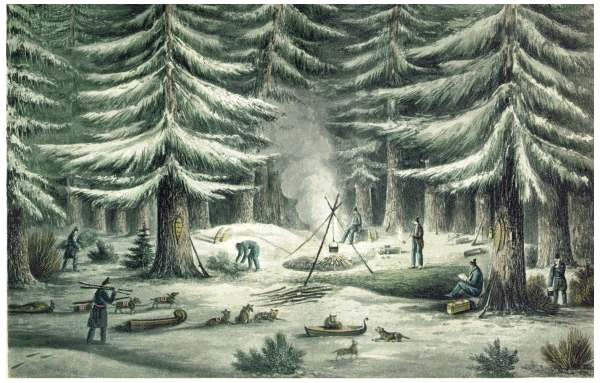
John Franklin's men constructing a camp during the first winter of the expedition to Coppermine River, c. 1820

Franklin's Coppermine expedition of 1819–1822 had as its goal the exploration of the northern coast of Canada, which was accessed by way of the Coppermine River. The British expedition was organised by the Royal Navy as part of its attempt to discover and map the Northwest Passage. It was the first of three Arctic expeditions to be led by John Franklin, and also included George Back and John Richardson, both of whom would become significant Arctic explorers in their own right.

In 1825, Franklin set out on his second expedition to the Canadian North. He travelled to the mouth of the Mackenzie River and then spent the winter at Fort Franklin, now Deline, on Great Bear Lake.

Franklin's fateful third expedition began in 1845 and was never heard from again. A massive search followed, at first finding little trace of the expedition but resulting in the mapping of much of the Arctic coastline. It was eventually learned that Franklin had died in 1847, and the remains of the expedition's two ships were finally found in 2014 and 2016.

George Back, a British naval officer, naturalist and artist, served under John Franklin in his first expedition to the Arctic in 1818. On Franklin's inland Coppermine expedition of 1819–1822, Back was responsible for all the surveying and chart making. Then on the Mackenzie River expedition in 1824–1826, Back was promoted to lieutenant and then to commander.

== Canadian Confederation and the late 19th century ==
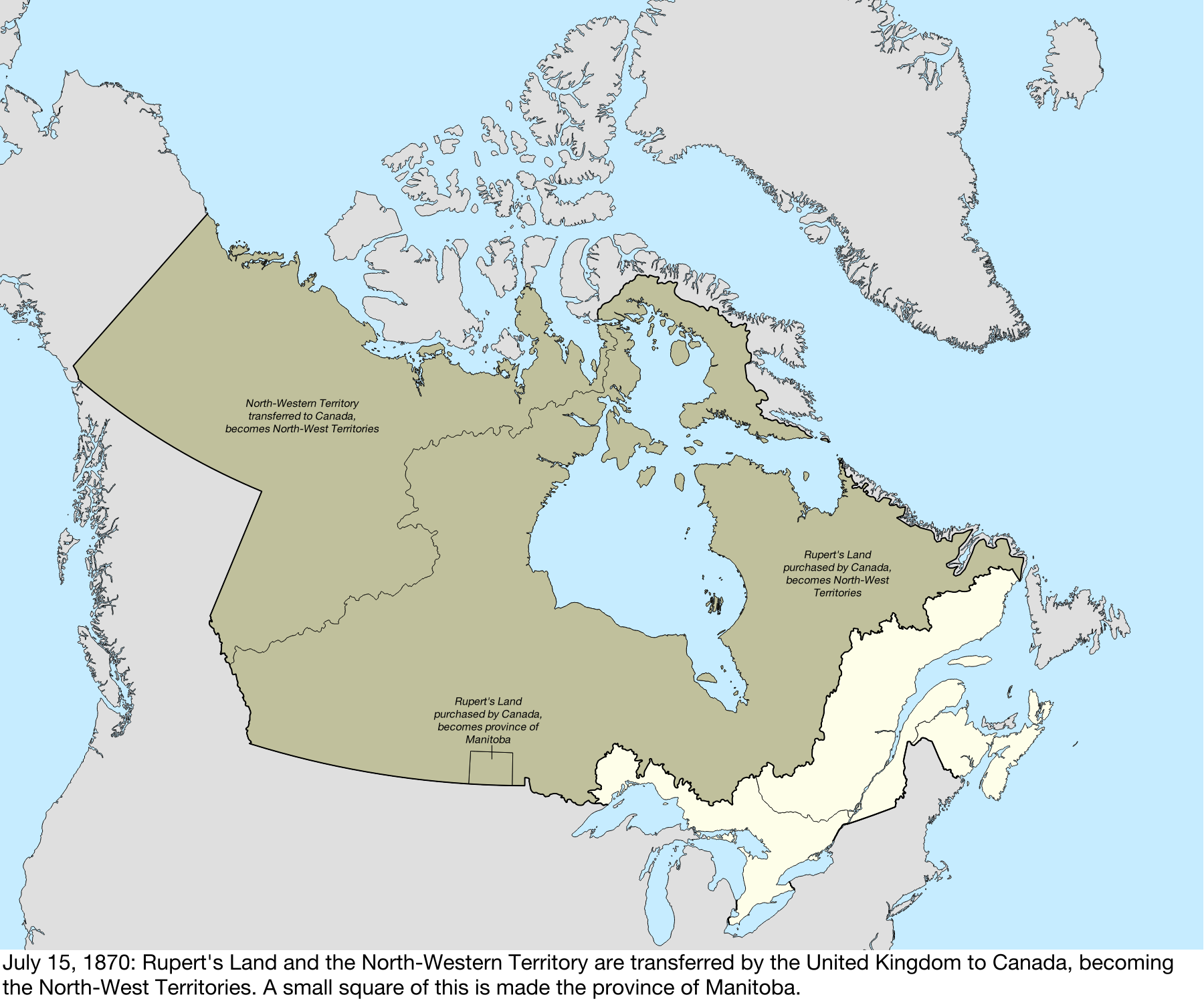
Map depicting Canada in 1870, with Rupert's Land and the North-Western Territory shaded in. The two territories were transferred from the UK to Canada in 1870 as a part of the Deed of Surrender, with most of these lands becoming the North-West Territories.

After the Deed of Surrender was enacted, the United Kingdom transferred ownership of Rupert's Land and the North-Western Territory from the Hudson's Bay Company to the government of Canada. However, integration of the territories into Canadian Confederation was delayed by the Red River Rebellion around the Red River Colony. Eventually the territories were admitted into Canadian Confederation on 15 July 1870 as the North-West Territories; barring the area around the Red River Colony, which was admitted into Canadian Confederation as the province of Manitoba.

In 1880, the British Arctic Territories was transferred from the United Kingdom to government of Canada, and was administered as a part of the North-West Territories.

=== Late 19th century ===
The first North-West Territories government sat in 1872 after the Temporary North-West Council was appointed. The first North-West Territories government sat inside the territories at Fort Livingstone for the first time in 1876. Now in Saskatchewan. The government moved to Battleford in 1878. The first territorial election took place in 1881. French was abolished as an official language in 1892.

During the late-19th century, the boundaries of the territories were redefined a number of times. In 1886, the District of Keewatin's south-western border was adjusted. In 1889, the disputed area between Manitoba and Ontario was generally granted to Ontario, with some going to the District of Keewatin, and Manitoba getting none. In 1898, following the Klondike Gold Rush, the Yukon stopped being part of the North-West Territories. A separate Yukon Territory is created from the western North-West Territories.

==== Treaty No. 8 ====
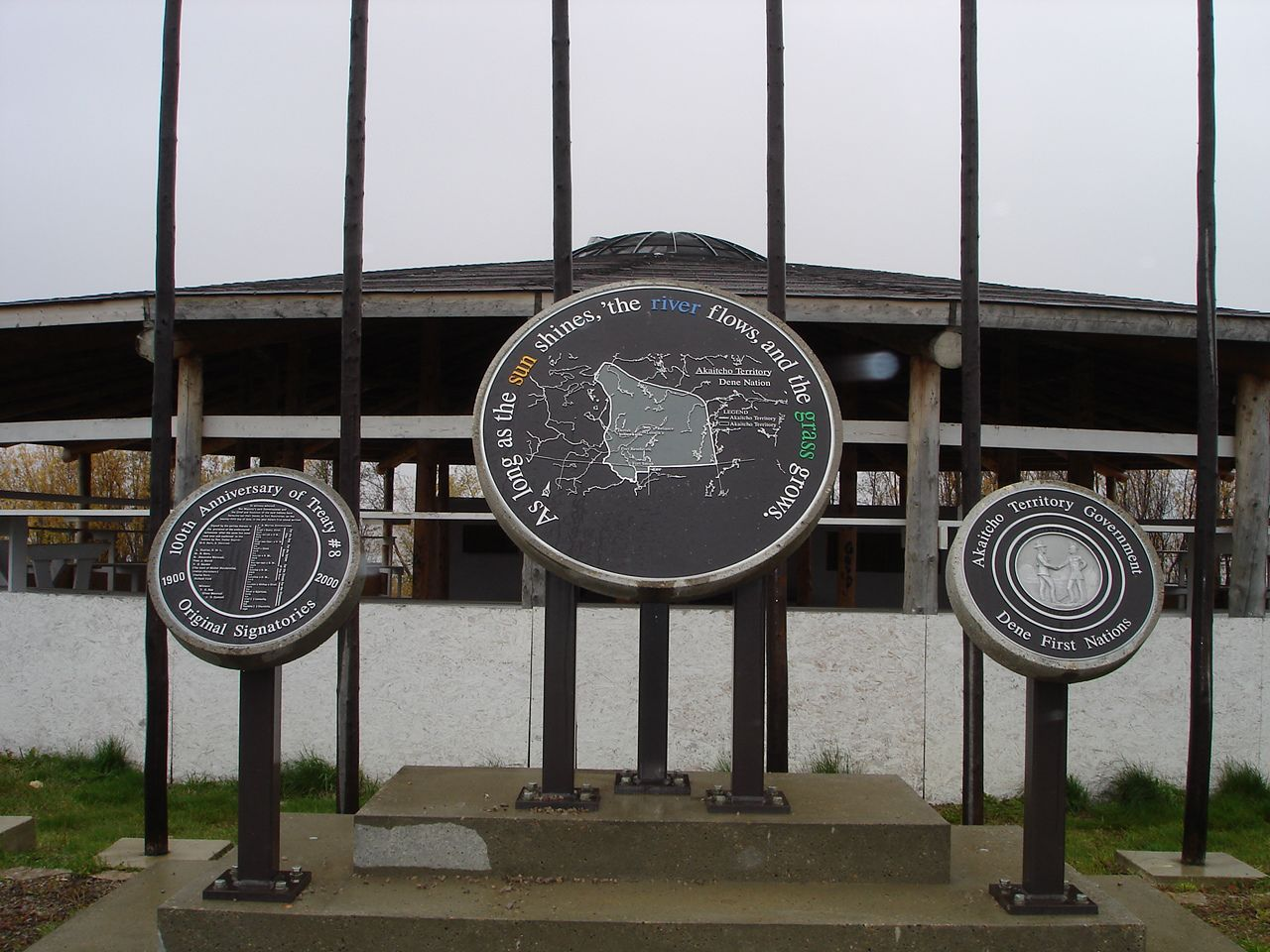
Markers commemorating the Treaty 8 site at Fort Resolution

In June 1899, negotiation began on Treaty No. 8, which covered 840,000 square kilometres in the North-West Territories. It was an agreement between the Canadian Government and the Dene groups in the area in question; in return for their willingness to share their land with non-Natives, the Dene would receive medical and educational assistance, as well as treaty payments. The Canadian Government and the various Dene groups, including Yellowknives and Tłįchǫ under chief Drygeese with headmen Benaiyah and Sek'eglinan, signed the treaty in 1900 at Fort Resolution (called by the Tłįchǫ Įndàà) . After the signing, the group that signed the treaty was called the "Yellowknife B Band" (Helm, 7: 1994). At that point in history, Treaty No. 8 was the largest land settlement the Canadian Government had ever made (PWNHC, Historical).

== 20th century ==
In 1901, the borders of Yukon Territory were changed, gaining area from the North-West Territories. Alberta and Saskatchewan separated from the territories in 1905. Although the District of Keewatin was given back to the territories, the population dropped from approx 160,000 to 17,000, of which 16,000 were aboriginal and had no right to vote under Canadian law. The government of the North-West Territories defaulted back to its 1870 constitutional status, and once again came under federal control, governed from Ottawa.

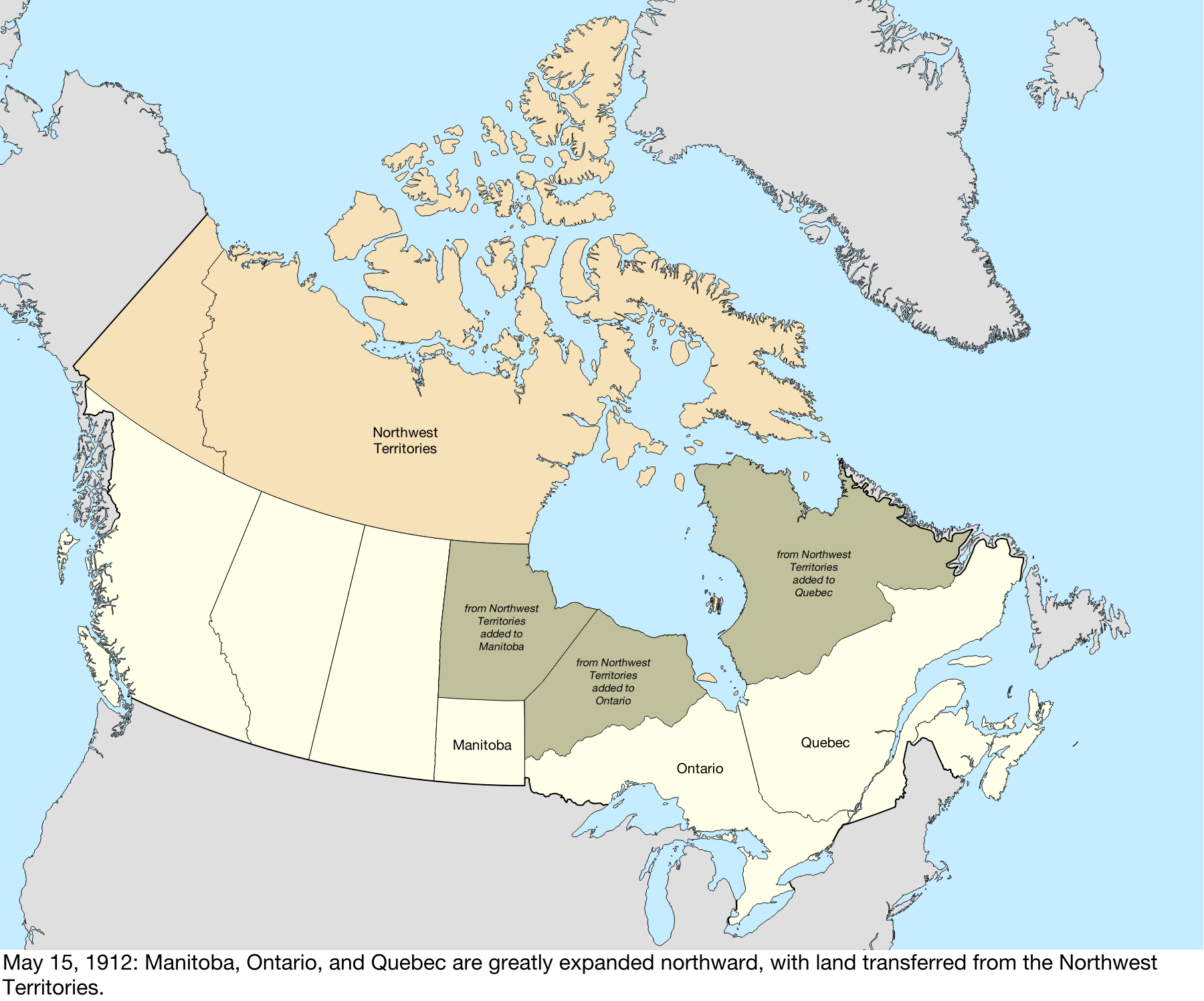
In 1912, the south-eastern portions of the Northwest Territories were transferred to various provincial jurisdictions. After this, the territory remained the same size from 1912 to 1999.

In 1906, the official name dropped the hyphen, changing to "Northwest Territories". On May 15, 1912, parts of the Northwest Territories were given to Manitoba, Ontario, and Quebec.

=== Interwar period (1918–1939) ===
Twenty years after Treaty No. 8 was signed, oil was discovered in the Mackenzie River Valley. Upon the discovery, the Canadian Government proposed another treaty that would clear the way for miners and development of the area. The treaty was greatly debated, as the Natives did not want to lose their right to hunt, fish, gather, and trap in the area. They also opposed being "confined to Indian reserves." Many Dene felt that Treaty No. 8 was not honoured by the Canadian Government, and some were afraid that this treaty would turn out similarly. Nevertheless, Treaty No. 11 was signed by the Tłı̨chǫ trading chief Monfwi in the summer of 1921. The Tłı̨chǫ groups that signed this treaty were then known as the "Dog Rib Rae Band" (Helm, 7: 1994), constituting the majority of the Tłįchǫ population. Both Treaty No. 8 and Treaty No. 11 overlap in several of their boundaries, and continue to cause conflict between the two separate treaty bands (nowadays two First Nations).

In 1925, based upon the sector principle, Canada became the first country to extend its maritime boundaries northward to the North Pole. The Northwest Territories gained in size to 3.3 million km^{2}. This was about one third of Canada's landmass.

In the summer of 1935, nearly 1000 men grouped into 188 surveying parties covered a wide range of Canada looking for precious minerals. The most valuable discovery was made in the Yellowknife district where nearly 3,000 square miles of good gold prospecting territory was located. This brought about the town of Yellowknife. Thirty-two years later, when the Government of the Northwest Territories came North from Ottawa, Yellowknife became the new capital.

=== World War II ===
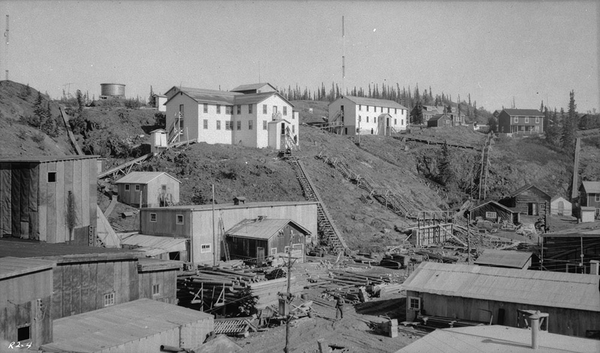
The Eldorado Mine, 1944. Expropriated by the Canadian government in 1939, it produced uranium for the Manhattan Project.

During World War II, the Canadian company Eldorado Gold Mines Ltd., which produced uranium as a byproduct of gold and radium production using ore from its mine at Port Radium in the Northwest Territories, was recruited by the Canadian government to assist in procuring uranium for the Manhattan Project. The ores were shipped from the Eldorado Mine to Port Hope, Ontario, to be processed.

Between 1942 and 1946, forty thousand American military and civilian personnel came to the Canadian north-west; invited by the Canadian government. Plans called for the Alaska Highway to connect Edmonton, Alberta, with Fairbanks, Alaska and for a pipeline to run from the oil fields of Norman Wells to the Pacific Coast. Major work commenced. Canada's north-west infrastructure developed quickly and the social impact of 40,000 military people affected lives throughout. Brigadier General James O'Connor, the military officer in charge of building the highway, described the difficulty of the work. "Engineer troops worked 10–12 hours a day through temperatures that ranged down to 70 below, hacking their way through forests, plunging into icy streams in life-preservers to sink bridge pilings, sweating through steaming summer days amid plagues of mosquitoes and 'no-see-ums,' to push the road through."

=== Early Cold War era (1945–1970) ===
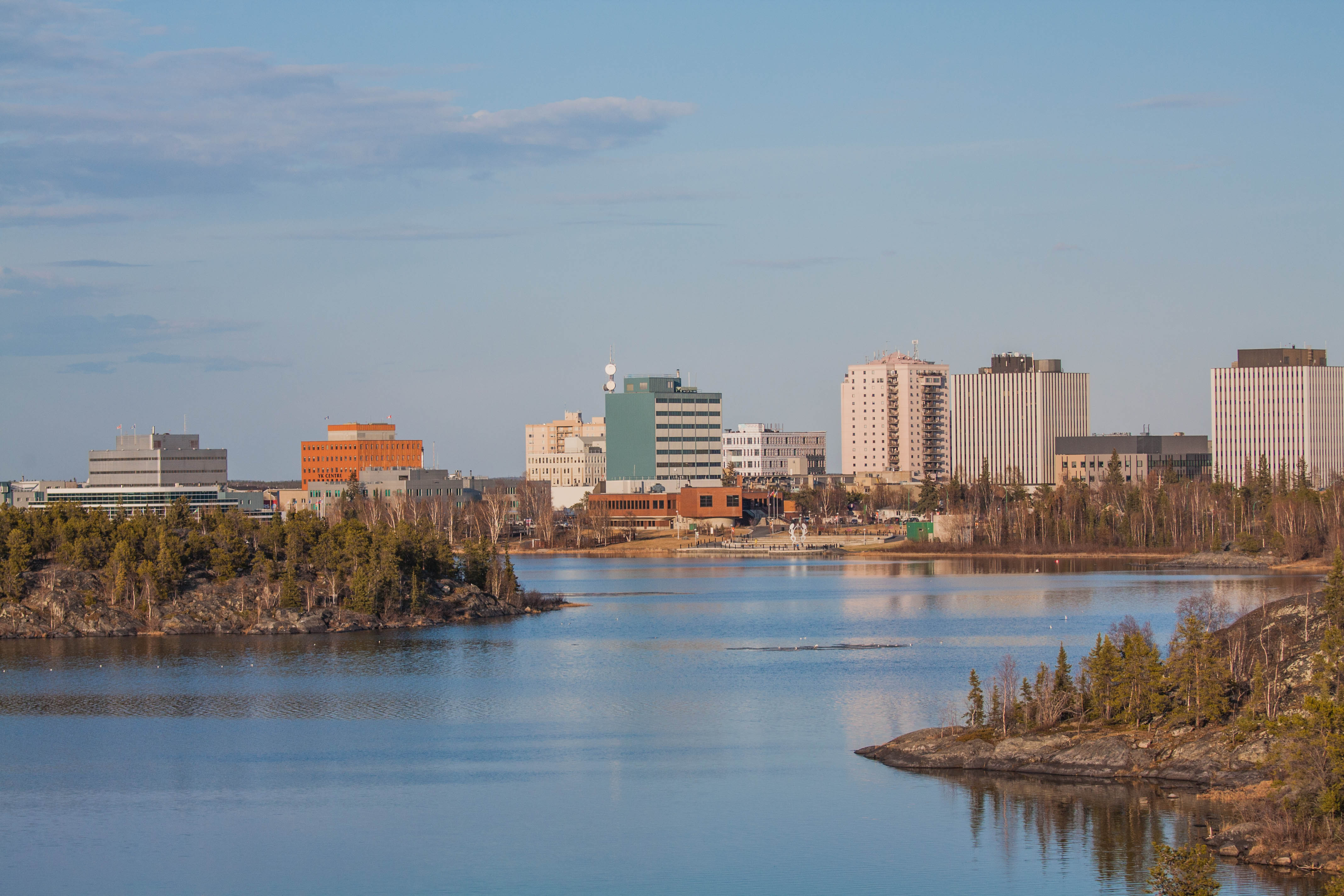
View of Yellowknife in 2014. The city was designated as the territory's new capital in 1967.

Elections returned in 1951, but rather than being fully elected body, the Councils and Assemblies were a mix of elected and appointed members.

In 1953–1955, during the Cold War, Canada sent Inuit families to the far north in the High Arctic relocation, partly to establish territoriality.

In 1967, the Minister of Indian Affairs and Northern Development, the Honourable Arthur Laing, announced that Yellowknife would be the capital of the Northwest Territories. On September 18, 1967, the Government of the Northwest Territories relocated from Ottawa to Yellowknife. Commissioner Stuart Milton Hodgson, and eighty-one employees of the Government of the Northwest Territories, arrived in Yellowknife on board a chartered DC-7.

In 1969, A special committee of the Legislative Assembly of the Northwest Territories chose a new flag for the territory. Robert Bessant's design was chosen among entries to a Canada-wide contest. The government also introduced the popular polar bear license plate in 1970.

=== Late 20th century (1971–2000) ===
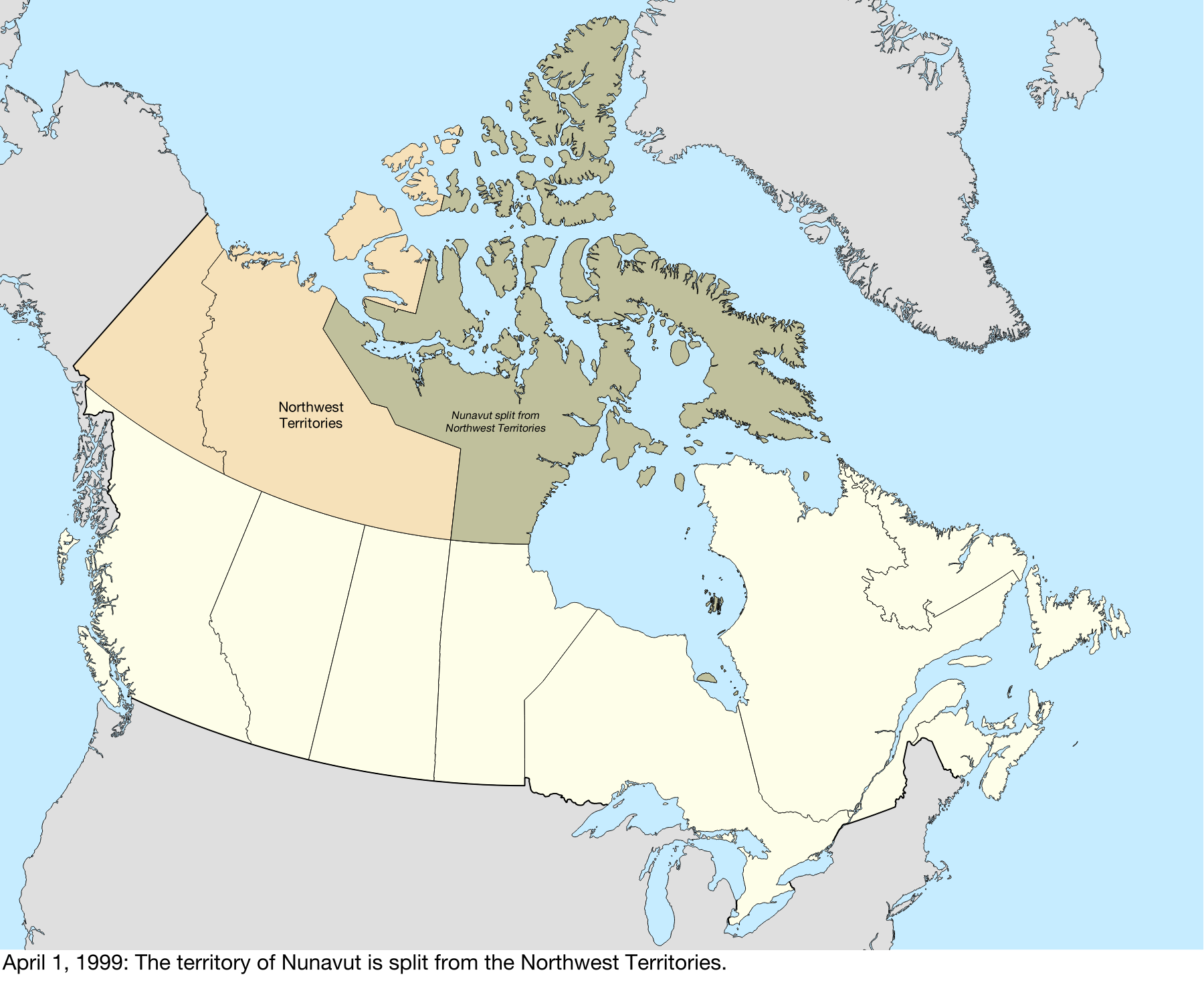
Map of Canada in 1999. The shaded area of the map was split from the Northwest Territories in 1999 to form the new territory of Nunavut.

In 1975, the territorial government once again became a fully elected body. In 1984, the Canadian Government agreed to transfer the responsibility for naming places to the territories. This power was already devolved to the provinces in 1961, but originally not to Canadian territories.

In April 1982, a majority of Northwest Territories' residents voted in favour of a division of the area, and the federal government gave a conditional agreement seven months later. After a long series of land claim negotiations between the Inuit Tapirisat of Canada and the federal government (begun earlier in 1976), an agreement was reached in September 1992. In June 1993, the Nunavut Land Claims Agreement Act and the Nunavut Act were passed by the Canadian Parliament, and the transition to the new territory of Nunavut was completed on April 1, 1999.

=== 21st century ===
In summer 2023, the territory was beset by some 230 wildfires, causing massive disruption. Some 70% of the territory's population had to be evacuated from their homes, including to other parts of Canada. This included 87% of the population of Yellowknife, including Premier Caroline Cochrane, as the fires approached less than 15 km from the capital.

== See also ==
=== People ===
- Commissioner of the Northwest Territories
- List of premiers of the Northwest Territories
- William Bompas

=== Places ===
- List of communities in the Northwest Territories
- Districts of the Northwest Territories
- Canadian canoe routes
- List of lakes in the Northwest Territories
- List of rivers of the Northwest Territories
- List of Northwest Territories highways
- List of mines in the Northwest Territories

=== Initiatives ===
- Geographical Names Board of Canada
- List of schools in the Northwest Territories
- List of school districts in the Northwest Territories
- List of Northwest Territories Legislative Assemblies
- List of Northwest Territories general elections
- Sahtu Dene and Metis Comprehensive Land Claim Agreement
- Territorial claims in the Arctic
- Carrothers Commission
- Bible translations into Cree
- Symbols of the Northwest Territories

== Bibliography ==
- Whitcomb, Dr. Ed. A Short History of the Canadian North. Ottawa. From Sea To Sea, 2011. ISBN 978-0-9865967-2-8. 62 pp.
- Fumoleau, René (2004). As Long as this Land Shall Last: A History of Treaty 8 and Treaty 11, 1870–1939
- Sturtevant, William C., ed. (1978). Handbook of North American Indians: Arctic. Vol. 5. Washington, D.C.: Government Printing Office. ISBN 978-0-1600-4580-6.
