= Geography of the Northwest Territories =

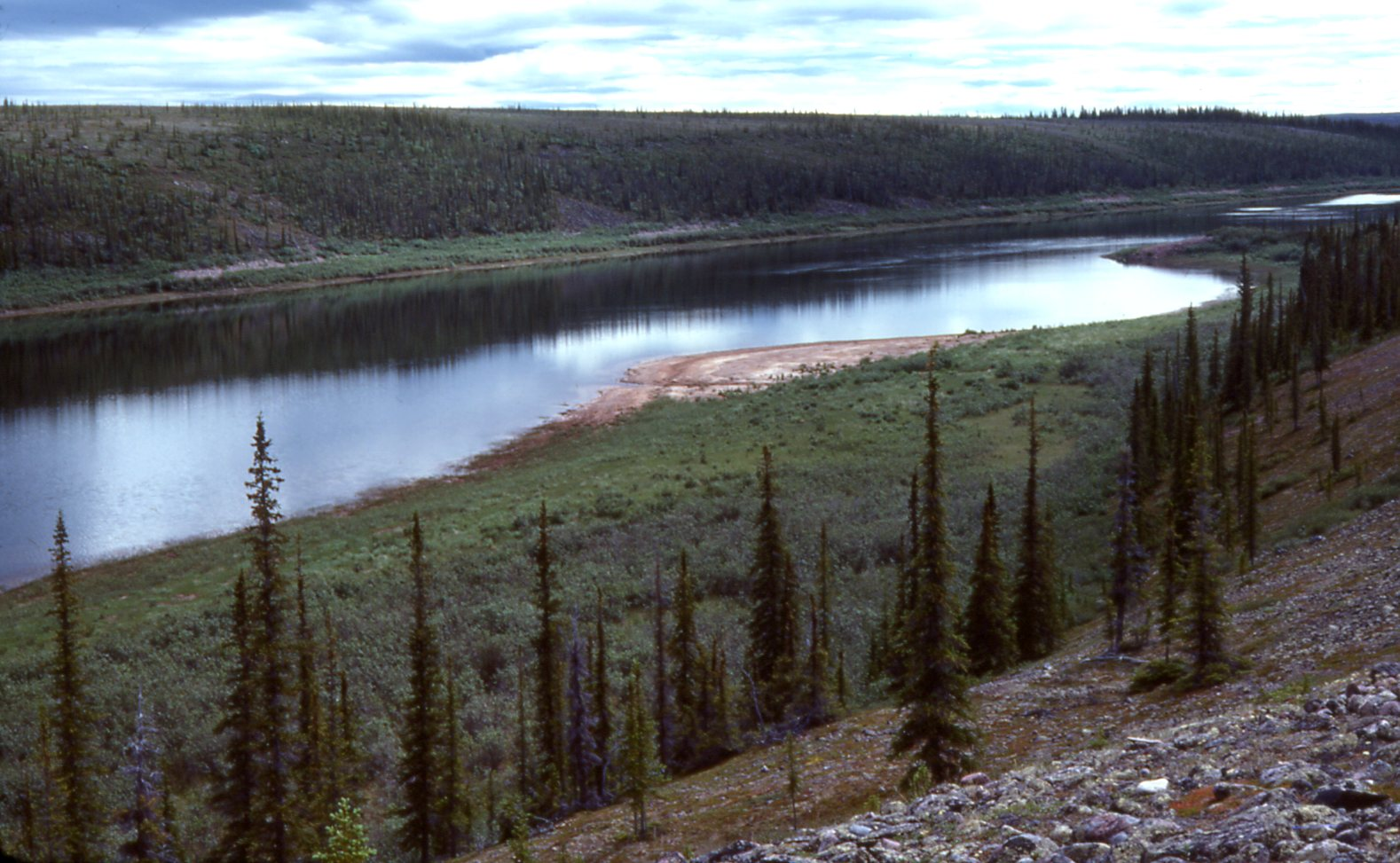
The Thelon River

The Northwest Territories is a territory in Northern Canada, specifically in Northwestern Canada between Yukon Territory and Nunavut including part of Victoria Island, Melville Island, and other islands on the western Arctic Archipelago. Originally a much wider territory enclosing most of central and northern Canada, the Northwest Territories was created in 1870 from the Hudson's Bay Company's holdings that were sold to Canada from 1869-1870. In addition, Alberta and Saskatchewan were formed from the territory in 1905. In 1999, it was divided again: the eastern portion became the new territory of Nunavut. Yellowknife stands as its largest city and capital. It has a population of 42,800 and has an area of 1,379,540 km^{2} (532,640 sq mi). The current territory lies west of Nunavut, north of latitude 60° north, and east of Yukon.

It stretches across the top of the North American continent, reaching into the Arctic Circle. The region consists of the following: many islands, such as Victoria Island, the Mackenzie River, and Great Bear and Great Slave lakes. Over half the people are Inuit and First Nations peoples. In the 18th century, the main land was explored by Samuel Hearne for the Hudson's Bay Company and by Alexander Mackenzie. European settlers were mainly whalers, fur traders, and missionaries until the 1920s, when oil was discovered and the territorial administration had formed. The principal industry is now mining, and centres of the petroleum and Natural Gas fields in the western Arctic coastal regions.

== History and founding ==
As European Incursions began in the region, they encountered the fishing and hunting Inuit and Dene. Vikings who came from Greenland may have been the first Europeans to explore the eastern section of the Northwest Territories, now Nunavut. Sir Martin Frobisher was the first of a long line of explorers to venture the Northwest Passage, but it was Henry Hudson who discovered the gateway to the Northwest (Hudson Bay) in 1610.

For several decades the Hudson's Bay Company sent trade-explorers into the northern sea lanes and along the coast; in 1771, Samuel Hearne went from Hudson Bay and descended the Coppermine River. By 1789, exploring for the North West Company, Alexander Mackenzie ventured to the mouth of the Mackenzie River. Sir John Franklin contributed scientific expeditions to the Arctic Northwest in the first half of the 19th century, gaining valuable geographic data.

The area of present Northwest Territories and Nunavut was part of the vast lands sold by the Hudson's Bay Company to the new Canadian Confederation in 1870. Some of those lands were added to the provinces of Ontario and Quebec. Then the province of Manitoba was formed from them in 1870, and Alberta and Saskatchewan in 1905, all south of 60° North. In 1898, the Yukon Territory was separated. The boundaries of the Northwest Territories were set in 1912 and stayed fixed until Nunavut was created in 1999. From 1920 until 1999 the Territories were divided into three districts: Franklin, Keewatin and Mackenzie.

Ever since the 1982 patriation of the Canadian Constitution, several land claims made by native peoples have made their way through the courts and federal government. In 1992, the residents of the Northwest Territories voted to divide the territory along ethnic lines, with the Inuit on the east and the Dene to the west. The new territory of Nunavut, dominated by the Inuit, came into existence on April 1, 1999. This split the Northwest Territories along a ziz-zag path running from the Saskatchewan-Manitoba border through the Arctic Archipelago on the North Pole. Other native peoples with claims were the Métis and the Inuvialuit. Joe Handley became the Territories' premier in December 2003.

== Communication and travel ==
In the Northwest Territories, transportation and communication can be problematic. Long winters tend to close the rivers to navigation for nearly two months. Apart from the Great Slave Railway and the Mackenzie Highway system, that links to Alberta and to the Great Slave Lake area, commerce, supply, and travel remain largely airborne. The region includes scores of airfields. An ongoing northern roads program, launched since 1966, is opening up the area. Moreover, the Liard Highway, opened in 1984, connects Fort Simpson to the Alaska Highway. Other highways link Inuvik to the Yukon and Hay River then Yellowknife to the highways in Alberta. In winter, some frozen rivers and lakes are used for road traffic. These are also vast telecommunication services.

== People and the land ==
Geographically, the area is mainly south of the tree line, which runs roughly northwest to southeast, from the Mackenzie River delta in the Arctic Ocean into the southeastern corner of the territory. Tundra is characteristic of the land north of the tree line; there the native people depend on hunting, arts and crafts, fur-trapping; and they obtain many resources from fish, seals, and caribou. The majority of the development in this area takes place south of the tree line, where the land is covered with soft woods and rich minerals. Two of the world's largest lakes (Great Slave and Great Bear) are located here. Great Slave Lake is the source of one of the world's longest rivers, the Mackenzie, that runs 1,120 miles (1,800 km) to its outlet into the Arctic Ocean. The Northwest Territories is the site of the northern end of Wood Buffalo National Park (est. 1922) and all of the Nahanni National Park (est. 1972).

== Climate ==
Köppen climate types in the Northwest Territories

The Northwest Territories extends for more than 1,300,000 km^{2} (500,000 sq mi) and has a large climate variant from south to north. The southern part of the territory (most of the mainland portion) has a subarctic climate, while the islands and northern coast have a polar climate.

Summers in the north are short and cool, featuring daytime highs of 14–17 degrees Celsius (57–63 °F) and lows of 1–5 degrees Celsius (34–41 °F). Winters are long and harsh, with daytime highs −20 to −25 °C (−4 to −13 °F) and lows −30 to −35 °C (−22 to −31 °F). The coldest nights typically reach −40 to −45 °C (−40 to −49 °F) each year.

Extremes are common with summer highs in the south reaching 36 °C (97 °F) and lows reaching below 0 °C (32 °F). In winter in the south, it is not uncommon for the temperatures to reach −40 °C (−40 °F), but they can also reach the low teens during the day. In the north, temperatures can reach highs of 30 °C (86 °F), and lows into the low negatives. In winter in the north it is not uncommon for the temperatures to reach −50 °C (−58 °F) but they can also reach single digits during the day.

Thunderstorms are not rare in the south. In the north they are very rare, but do occur. Tornadoes are extremely rare but have happened with the most notable one happening just outside Yellowknife that destroyed a communications tower. The Territory has a fairly dry climate due to the mountains in the west.

About half of the territory is above the tree line. There are not many trees in most of the eastern areas of the territory, or in the north islands.

=== Climate data ===
Average daily maximum and minimum temperatures for selected cities in Northwest Territories
City	July (°C)	July (°F)	January (°C)	January (°F)
Fort Simpson	24/11	75/52	−20/−29	−4/−19
Yellowknife	21/13	70/55	−22/−30	−7/−21
Inuvik	20/9	67/48	−23/−31	−9/−24
Sachs Harbour	10/3	50/38	−24/−32	−12/−25

== Economy ==
Agriculture is nearly impossible in the Northwest Territories except for limited cultivation south of the Mackenzie River area. Trapping is the region's oldest industry, and ranks second after mining. Another thriving industry is fishing, based on lake trout and whitefish, centered on the village of Hay River, on Great Slave Lake. Minerals are currently the Territories' most valuable natural resource. Oil is to be pumped and refined at Tulita (formerly Fort Norman) and Norman Wells on the Mackenzie River. Copper is extracted on the Coppermine River. Diamonds and gold are currently produced in increasing amounts. The region also has tungsten, silver, cadmium, and nickel.

There are significant hydroelectric developments on the Talston and Snare rivers.

== Additional ==
=== Government ===
The territory is governed through a 22-member Legislative Assembly which elects a premier and cabinet; an appointed commissioner holds a position similar to that of a Canadian lieutenant governor. The territory sends one Senator and one Member of Parliament to the Parliament of Canada.

See also

- Legislative Assembly of Northwest Territories
- Northwest Territories lists:
  Airports · Lieutenant-governors · Commissioners · General elections · Premiers · Plebiscites · Highways · Capital cities · Legislative Assemblies · Communities (abandoned) ·

== See also ==
- List of rivers of the Northwest Territories
- List of protected areas of the Northwest Territories
- List of highest points of Canadian provinces and territories
- List of areas disputed by the United States and Canada
- Extreme communities of Canada
- Canadian Rockies
- Canadian Geographic

Lists: Regions of Canada • Islands of Canada • Rivers of Canada • Lakes of Canada • Mountains in Canada • List of National Parks of Canada

Provincial geography: Alberta • British Columbia • Manitoba • Newfoundland and Labrador • New Brunswick • Nova Scotia • Nunavut • Ontario • Quebec • Saskatchewan • Northwest Territories • Yukon

- List of Canadian provincial and territorial symbols
- Nunavut
- Scouting in the Northwest Territories
