= List of premiers of the Northwest Territories =

The premier of the Northwest Territories is a title given to the head of government in the Northwest Territories of Canada when the territory is using an elected system of responsible government. Throughout its history, the territory has been governed by various combinations of locally elected governments and administrators appointed by the government of Canada.

Upon creation, the Northwest Territories were governed by the lieutenant governor of Manitoba, a representative of the federal government and Queen Victoria, for the newly created province of Manitoba. Six years later in 1876, the territory was given its own lieutenant governor, separate from that of Manitoba. These lieutenant governors presided over an assembly with members both elected and appointed by the federal government. Before 1888, the territory required electoral districts with an area of 3,000 km^{2} (1,200 sq mi) to contain at least 1,000 people. When this quota was met, a by-election was held to elect a member to replace an appointed one.

The Northwest Territories held its first general elections to the North-West Legislative Assembly in 1888 when it considered the population to be sufficient. After this election, the chairman of the assembly's executive committee (analogous to a cabinet) assumed the role of head of government. From 1897 to 1905, the chairman used the title "premier", the same title used by the heads of government in the Canadian provinces.

In 1905, the provinces of Saskatchewan and Alberta were created from the most populous regions of the Northwest Territories. With a much lower population, powers of the territory's head of government reverted to a federal and Crown representative appointed by the prime minister of Canada, this time with the title Commissioner of the Northwest Territories. Beginning in 1951, and increasingly in 1967, powers were transferred back to an elected assembly. In 1980, the head of this assembly regained the title of premier, and in 1985 the became chair of the Executive Council and full head of government.

Because the Northwest Territories has a consensus government, the premier is elected by, and from, the members of the Legislative Assembly, and are not divided into parties. This list contains only those government leaders who governed under an elected system of responsible government. For the heads of government before and in between these times, see commissioner of the Northwest Territories.

== Premiers of the Northwest Territories ==
No.	Portrait	Name (Birth–Death)	Term of office	Electoral mandates (Assembly)	Political party	Parliamentary seat	Ref.
Chairman of the Lt. Governor's Advisory Council
—		Robert Brett (1851–1929)	30 June 1888 – 7 November 1891	1888 election (1st NW Leg.)	Non-partisan	MLA for Red Deer	
Chairman of the Executive Committee
—		Frederick Haultain (1857–1942)	7 November 1891 – 7 October 1897	1891 election (2nd NW Leg.) 1894 election (3rd NW Leg.)	Non-partisan	MLA for Macleod	
Premiers of the Northwest Territories
1		Frederick Haultain (1857–1942)	7 October 1897 – 24 August 1905	1898 election (4th NW Leg.) 1902 election (5th NW Leg.)	Liberal–Conservative	MLA for Macleod	
See commissioner of the Northwest Territories for the heads of government between 1905 and 1980.
2		George Braden (Note: Before 1994, the position was officially known as Government Leader; however, the territory has retroactively applied the title of Premier.) (1949–2015)	16 June 1980 – 12 January 1984	Appointment (9th Leg.)	Non-partisan	MLA for Yellowknife North	
3		Richard Nerysoo (b. 1953)	12 January 1984 – 5 November 1985	1983 election (10th Leg.)	Non-partisan	MLA for Mackenzie Delta	
4		Nick Sibbeston (b. 1943)	5 November 1985 – 12 November 1987	Appointment (10th Leg.)	Non-partisan	MLA for Deh Cho Gah	
5		Dennis Patterson (b. 1948)	12 November 1987 – 14 November 1991	1987 election (11th Leg.)	Non-partisan	MLA for Iqaluit	
6		Nellie Cournoyea (b. 1940)	14 November 1991 – 22 November 1995	1991 election (12th Leg.)	Non-partisan	MLA for Nunakput	
7		Don Morin (b. 1954)	22 November 1995 – 26 November 1998	1995 election (13th Leg.)	Non-partisan	MLA for Tu Nedhe	
acting		Goo Arlooktoo (1963–2002)	26 November 1998 – 10 December 1998	Appointment (13th Leg.)	Non-partisan	MLA for Baffin South	
8		Jim Antoine (b. 1949)	10 December 1998 – 17 January 2000	Appointment (13th Leg.) 1999 election (14th Leg.)	Non-partisan	MLA for Nahendeh	
9		Stephen Kakfwi (b. 1950)	17 January 2000 – 10 December 2003	Appointment (14th Leg.)	Non-partisan	MLA for Sahtu	
10		Joe Handley (b. 1943)	10 December 2003 – 19 October 2007	2003 election (15th Leg.)	Non-partisan	MLA for Weledeh	
11		Floyd Roland (b. 1961)	19 October 2007 – 26 October 2011	2007 election (16th Leg.)	Non-partisan	MLA for Inuvik Boot Lake	
12		Bob McLeod (b. 1952)	26 October 2011 – 24 October 2019	2011 election (17th Leg.) 2015 election (18th Leg.)	Non-partisan	MLA for Yellowknife South	
13		Caroline Cochrane (b. 1960)	24 October 2019 – 8 December 2023	2019 election (19th Leg.)	Non-partisan	MLA for Range Lake	
14		R. J. Simpson (b. 1980)	8 December 2023 – incumbent	2023 election (20th Leg.)	Non-partisan	MLA for Hay River North	

== See also ==
- List of Northwest Territories general elections
- List of lieutenant governors of the Northwest Territories
