= 15th Northwest Territories Legislative Assembly =

Sitting legislature or council

15th Legislative Assembly

Type
- Type: Unicameral

History
- Established: 2003
- Disbanded: 2007
- Preceded by: 14th Northwest Territories Legislative Assembly
- Succeeded by: 16th Northwest Territories Legislative Assembly
- Seats: 19

Elections
- Last election: 2003

Meeting place
- Yellowknife

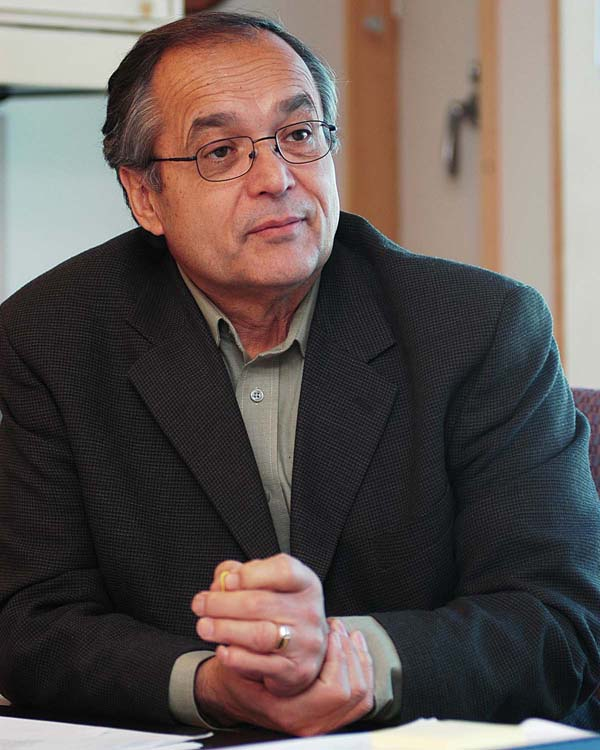
Former Premier Joe Handley

The 15th Northwest Territories Legislative Assembly was the 23rd sitting legislature or council in Northwest Territories history. It lasted from 2003 until September 3, 2007. The primary membership was elected in the 2003 Northwest Territories general election. There were two by-elections conducted during the interim.

Joe Handley was Premier. David Krutko, then Paul Delorey were Speakers during the sitting.

== Members elected in the 2003 general election ==
| District | Member | First elected / previously elected | No. of terms |
|---|---|---|---|
| Deh Cho | Michael McLeod | 1999 | 2nd term |
| Frame Lake | Charles Dent | 1991 | 4th term |
| Great Slave | Bill Braden | 1999 | 2nd term |
| Hay River North | Paul Delorey | 1999 | 2nd term |
| Hay River South | Jane Groenewegen | 1995 | 3rd term |
| Inuvik Boot Lake | Floyd Roland | 1995 | 3rd term |
| Inuvik Twin Lakes | Roger Allen | 2003 | 1st term |
| Inuvik Twin Lakes | Robert C. McLeod (2004) | 2004 | 1st term |
| Kam Lake | Dave Ramsay | 2003 | 1st term |
| Mackenzie Delta | David Krutko | 1995 | 3rd term |
| Monfwi | Henry Zoe | 1987, 2003 | 3rd term* |
| Monfwi | Jackson Lafferty (2005) | 2005 | 1st term |
| Nahendeh | Kevin A. Menicoche | 2003 | 1st term |
| Nunakput | Calvin P. Pokiak | 2003 | 1st term |
| Range Lake | Sandy Lee | 1999 | 2nd term |
| Sahtu | Norman Yakeleya | 2003 | 1st term |
| Thebacha | Michael Miltenberger | 1995 | 3rd term |
| Tu Nedhe | Bobby J. Villeneuve | 2003 | 1st term |
| Weledeh | Joe Handley | 1999 | 2nd term |
| Yellowknife Centre | Robert Hawkins | 2003 | 1st term |
| Yellowknife South | Brendan Bell | 1999 | 2nd term |

== Members elected in by-elections ==
- Robert C. McLeod replaced Roger Allen in Inuvik Twin Lakes, November 29, 2004

Resignation of Roger Allen

- Jackson Lafferty replaced Henry Zoe in North Slave, July 18, 2005

Resignation of Henry Zoe

== See also ==
- List of Northwest Territories Legislative Assemblies
- List of Northwest Territories general elections
- Speaker of the Legislative Assembly of Northwest Territories
