= 2nd Northwest Territories Legislative Council =

9th assembly of territorial government

2nd Legislative Council

Type
- Type: Unicameral

History
- Established: 1954
- Disbanded: 1957
- Preceded by: 1st Northwest Territories Legislative Council
- Succeeded by: 3rd Northwest Territories Legislative Council
- Seats: 9

Elections
- Last election: 1954

Meeting place
- Various communities and Ottawa

The 2nd Northwest Territories Legislative Council was the 9th assembly of the territorial government, lasting from the election of 1954 until dissolution in 1957. A total of four elected members and five appointed members comprised this council.

== Radio broadcasts ==
John Parker made national news, bringing the attention of the council to radio broadcasts from Radio Moscow that were being received with greater clarity in most of the Northwest Territories than broadcasts from the Canadian Broadcasting Corporation. Parker emphasized the danger of northern residents falling victim to the communist propaganda, as most of the Inuit did not yet identify Canada as a nation, and other northern residents being susceptible with the limited media coverage that was available in the north at the time.

== Reforms ==
Commissioner Robert Gordon Robertson, who had been recently appointed in the last session, made two critical reforms to the way council operated in this session that had lasting implications. The first reform was introduced at the first session held in the Elks Hall at Yellowknife. The amendment to the Rules in Council permitted members of Council to make a reply to the speech from the throne.

The second reform had to do with the Commissioner's lack of Executive Council. Robertson started putting out references for advice to council members to help guide him on critical issues of the day facing the territories. He wanted an Executive Council to advise him as the Lieutenant Governors had prior to 1897 had, and this method was the closest he could to achieve that.

== Legislation ==
The first Legislative Session took place in the basement of the Elks Hall in Yellowknife in the spring of 1954. A total of nine bills were passed, mostly amendments to existing legislation. The second session held in Ottawa saw a total of seventeen bills passed.

The biggest issue dealt with during this session was the question relating to sales of liquor for Indians and Inuit which had been prohibited under a Northwest Territories law dating back to the Temporary North-West Council. The prohibition meant that bootlegging was commonplace, as was consumption of alternate forms of alcohol such as shoe polish, antifreeze and vanilla extract, resulting in needless deaths and endemic social issues. After debate the council agreed to change the regulations to allow liquor privileges to be the same for everyone. The federal government, however, disagreed and vetoed the changes.

== Membership ==
District / position	Member	First Appointed / First elected	No. of terms
Appointed Member	Louis Audette	1947	3rd term
Appointed Member	Jean Boucher	1954	1st term
Appointed Member	William Clements	1951	2nd term
Appointed Member	Leonard Nicholson	1951	2nd term
Deputy Commissioner	Frank Cunningham	1951	3rd term
Mackenzie Delta	Frank Carmichael	1951	2nd term
Mackenzie North	John Parker	1954	1st term
Mackenzie River	John Goodall	1954	1st term
Mackenzie South	Robert Poritt	1954	1st term
