= 13th Northwest Territories Legislative Assembly =

13th Legislative Assembly

Type
- Type: Unicameral

History
- Established: 1995
- Disbanded: 1999
- Preceded by: 12th Northwest Territories Legislative Assembly
- Succeeded by: 14th Northwest Territories Legislative Assembly
- Seats: 24

Elections
- Last election: 1995

Meeting place
- Yellowknife

The 13th Northwest Territories Legislative Assembly was the 20th assembly of the territorial government and it lasted from 1995 to 1999. This assembly was dissolved due to the creation of Nunavut.

== Members of the Legislative Assembly ==
13th Northwest Territories Legislative Assembly
| District | Member | First elected / previously elected | No. of terms |
|---|---|---|---|
| Aivilik | Manitok Thompson | 1995 | 2nd term |
| Amittuq | Mark Evaloarjuk | 1975, 1995 | 3rd term* |
| Baffin Central | Tommy Enuaraq | 1995 | 1st term |
| Baffin South | Goo Arlooktoo | 1995 | 1st term |
| Deh Cho | Samuel Gargan | 1983 | 4th term |
| Hay River | Jane Groenewegen | 1995 | 1st term |
| High Arctic | Levi Barnabas | 1995 | 1st term |
| Inuvik | Floyd Roland | 1995 | 1st term |
| Iqaluit | Ed Picco | 1995 | 1st term |
| Keewatin Central | John Todd | 1991 | 2nd term |
| Kitikmeot | Kelvin Ng | 1993 | 2nd term |
| Kivallivik | Kevin O'Brien | 1995 | 1st term |
| Mackenzie Delta | David Krutko | 1995 | 1st term |
| Nahendeh | Jim Antoine | 1991 | 2nd term |
| Natilikmiot | John Ningark | 1989 | 3rd term |
| North Slave | James Rabesca | 1970, 1995 | 2nd term* |
| Nunakput | Vince Steen | 1995 | 1st term |
| Sahtu | Stephen Kakfwi | 1987 | 3rd term |
| Thebacha | Michael Miltenberger | 1995 | 1st term |
| Tu Nedhe | Don Morin | 1987 | 3rd term |
| Yellowknife Centre | Jake Ootes | 1995 | 1st term |
| Yellowknife-Frame Lake | Charlie Dent | 1991 | 2nd term |
| Yellowknife North | Roy Erasmus | 1995 | 1st term |
| Yellowknife South | Seamus Henry | 1995 | 1st term |
