= M-Day =

M-Day may refer to:

- M-Day (book) (Russian: День „М”), a history book by Viktor Suvorov
- M-Day, in the Marvel Comics Decimation storyline
- M-Day, a military designation of days and hours for the day on which mobilization commences
- Mobilization Day, the day Canadian police would arrest suspected communists under the secret PROFUNC program
