= 4th Northwest Territories Legislative Council =

4th Legislative Council

Type
- Type: Unicameral

History
- Established: 1960
- Disbanded: 1964
- Preceded by: 3rd Northwest Territories Legislative Council
- Succeeded by: 5th Northwest Territories Legislative Council
- Seats: 9

Elections
- Last election: 1960

Meeting place
- Various communities and Ottawa

The 4th Northwest Territories Legislative Council was the 11th assembly of the territorial government. It lasted from 1960 to 1964.

== Membership ==
District / position	Member	First Appointed / First elected	No. of terms
Appointed Member	Wilfrid Brown	1957	2nd term
Appointed Member	D.M. Collican	1960	1st term
Appointed Member	L.A. Desrochers	1960	1st term
Appointed Member	H.M. Jones	1960	1st term
Appointed Member	I. Norman Smith	1960	1st term
Mackenzie Delta	Knut Lang	1957	2nd term
Mackenzie North	E.J. Gall	1959	2nd term
Mackenzie River	John Goodall	1954	3rd term
Mackenzie South	A.P Carey	1960	1st term
Mackenzie South	Paul William Kaeser (1962)	1962	1st term
