= 1957 Northwest Territories general election =

The 1957 Northwest Territories general election was held on August 19, 1957.

== Appointed members ==
3rd Northwest Territories Legislative Council
Member	New/Re-appointed
Louis Audette	Re-appointed
Jean Boucher	Re-appointed
C.M. Drury	New
Wilfrid Brown	New
Leonard Nicholson	Re-appointed

== Elected members ==
For complete electoral history, see individual districts

3rd Northwest Territories Legislative Council
District	Member
Mackenzie Delta	Knut Lang
Mackenzie North	John Parker
Mackenzie River	John Goodall
Mackenzie South	Robert Porritt
