= 3rd Northwest Territories Legislative Council =

3rd Legislative Council

Type
- Type: Unicameral

History
- Established: 1957
- Disbanded: 1960
- Preceded by: 2nd Northwest Territories Legislative Council
- Succeeded by: 4th Northwest Territories Legislative Council
- Seats: 9

Elections
- Last election: 1957

Meeting place
- Various communities and Ottawa

The 3rd Northwest Territories Legislative Council was the 10th assembly of the territorial government. It lasted from 1957 until 1960.

== Mid term appointments ==
This council had five seats reserved for appointed members.

Former member	Replacement	Reason	Date
Unknown	E.J. Gall	Unknown	1958
E.J. Gall	Unknown	E.J. Gall became elected to the Council	1959

== By-elections ==
At least 1 by-election occurred in this Assembly.

District	Former member	Replacement	Reason	Date
Mackenzie North	John Goodall	E.J. Gall	Unknown	1959

== Membership ==
District / position	Member	First Appointed / First elected	No. of terms
Appointed Member	Louis Audette	1947	4th term
Appointed Member	Wilfrid Brown	1957	1st term
Appointed Member	Jean Boucher	1954	2nd term
Appointed Member	C.M. Drury	1957	1st term
Appointed Member	Leonard Nicholson	1951	3rd term
Mackenzie Delta	Knut Lang	1957	1st term
Mackenzie North	John Parker	1954	2nd term
Mackenzie North	E.J. Gall (1959)	1959	1st term
Mackenzie River	John Goodall	1954	2nd term
Mackenzie South	Robert Poritt	1954	2nd term
