= 14th Northwest Territories Legislative Assembly =

14th Legislative Assembly

Type
- Type: Unicameral

History
- Established: 1999
- Disbanded: 2003
- Preceded by: 13th Northwest Territories Legislative Assembly
- Succeeded by: 15th Northwest Territories Legislative Assembly
- Seats: 19

Elections
- Last election: 1999

Meeting place
- Yellowknife

The 14th Northwest Territories Legislative Assembly was the 22nd assembly of the territorial government. This assembly lasted from 1999 until its dissolution in 2003. This was the first assembly in the new Northwest Territories that was split in half to create Nunavut. As a result of division membership dropped from 24 to 19 seats with the political map being radically altered.

== Members of the Legislative Assembly ==
14th Northwest Territories Legislative Assembly
District	Member	First elected / previously elected	No. of terms
Deh Cho	Michael McLeod	1999	1st term
Frame Lake	Charles Dent	1991	3rd term
Great Slave	Bill Braden	1999	1st term
Hay River North	Paul Delorey	1999	1st term
Hay River South	Jane Groenewegen	1995	2nd term
Inuvik Boot Lake	Floyd Roland	1995	2nd term
Inuvik Twin Lakes	Roger Allen	1999	1st term
Kam Lake	Tony Whitford	1988, (Note: Yellowknife South) 1999	3rd term*
Mackenzie Delta	David Krutko	1995	2nd term
Nahendeh	Jim Antoine	1991	3rd term
North Slave	Leon Lafferty	1999	1st term
Nunakput	Vince Steen	1995	2nd term
Range Lake	Sandy Lee	1999	1st term
Sahtu	Stephen Kakfwi	1987	4th term
Thebacha	Michael Miltenberger	1995	2nd term
Tu Nedhe	Steven Nitah	1999	1st term
Weledeh	Joe Handley	1999	1st term
Yellowknife Centre	Jake Ootes	1995	2nd term
Yellowknife South	Brendan Bell	1999	1st term
