= History of Northwest Territories capital cities =

Capitals of a Canadian territory (1870–)

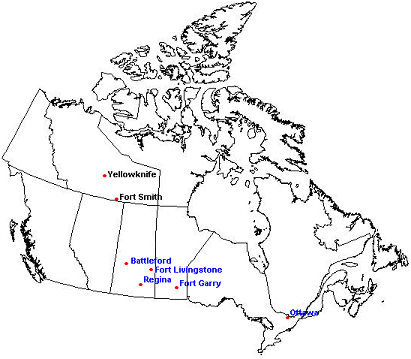
Northwest Territories capitals
City	Years
Fort Garry	1870–1876
Fort Livingstone	1876–1877
Battleford	1877–1883
Regina	1883–1905
Ottawa	1905–1967
Fort Smith	1911–1967
Yellowknife	1967–present

The history of Northwest Territories capital cities begins with the purchase of the Territories by Canada from the Hudson's Bay Company in 1869, and includes a varied and often difficult evolution. Northwest Territories is unique amongst the other provinces and territories of Canada in that it has had seven capital cities in its history. The territory has changed the seat of government for numerous reasons, including civil conflict, development of infrastructure, and a history of significant revisions to its territorial boundaries.

The result of these changes has been a long and complex road to responsible government. Effectively providing services and representation for the population has been a particular challenge for the Territories' government, a task often complicated by the region's vast and changing geographic area. A small number of communities in Northwest Territories have unsuccessfully tried to become the capital over the years. The territory has had the seat of government outside of its territorial boundaries twice in its history. The only other political division in Canada without a seat of government inside its own boundaries was the defunct District of Keewatin that existed from 1876 until 1905.

The term "capital" refers to cities that have served as home for the Legislative Assembly of Northwest Territories, the legislative branch of Northwest Territories government. In Canada, it is customary for provincial and territorial level government to have the administrative centre of the civil service in the same city as the legislative branch. The Northwest Territories, however, had separate administrative and legislative capitals officially exist between 1911 and 1967. This is the only province or territory in Canadian history to have had such an arrangement.

== Fort Garry (1870–1876) ==
The Government of Canada purchased the North-Western Territory and Rupert's Land from the Hudson's Bay Company in 1868, under the terms of the Rupert's Land Act 1868 for £300,000 sterling. Both purchased territories were largely uninhabited, consisting mostly of uncharted wilderness. After the purchase, the Government decided to merge both of the properties into a single jurisdiction and appoint a single territorial government to run both. The purchase of the two territories added a sizable portion of the current Canadian landmass.

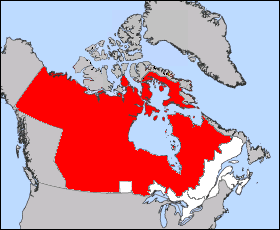
Canada (1870) in red and white: Manitoba is the small white box surrounded by the Territories (red).

In 1869, Ontario Member of Parliament William McDougall was appointed as the first Lieutenant Governor of the Northwest Territories and sent to Fort Garry to establish formal governance for Canada. Before his party arrived at the settlement, a small group led by Louis Riel intercepted him near the Ontario border and forced him to turn back because they opposed the transfer to the Canadian government. The inhabitants of the Red River Valley began the Red River Rebellion, delaying formal governance until their demands for provincial status were met.

The rebellion resulted in the creation of the Province of Manitoba (inclusive of Fort Garry) and a delay in establishing governance in the Territories. In 1870, the Northwest Territories and Manitoba formally entered the Canadian Confederation. The two jurisdictions remained partially conjoined: under the Temporary Government Act, 1870. The Temporary North-West Council was appointed in 1872, mainly from members of the new Manitoba Legislative Assembly, with the Lieutenant Governor of Manitoba serving as the leader of the territorial government. The Governor and Council were mandated to govern the Territories through the Manitoba Act and did so from outside of the Northwest Territories. Fort Garry served as the first seat of government for both jurisdictions.

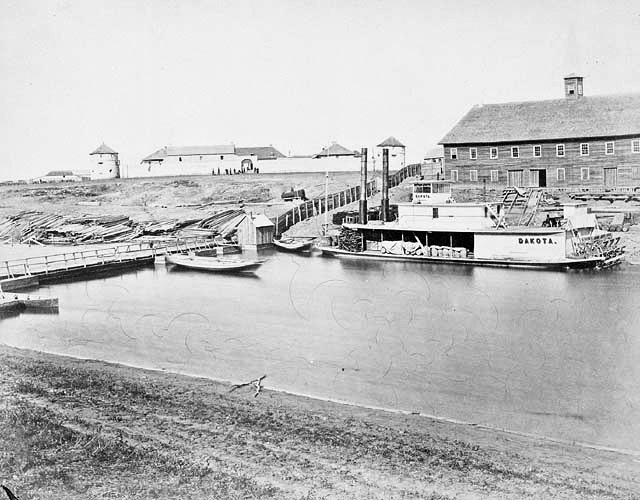
Fort Garry in the early 1870s

The temporary government sat for the first time in 1872. It was renewed by federal legislation each year until a permanent solution for governance was decided upon. The federal government renewed the Temporary Council for the last time in 1875 and chose a new location, within the boundaries of the Northwest Territories, to form a new government. Along with the new seat of power, a new council greatly reduced in size was appointed along with a new Lieutenant Governor to specifically lead the Territories without also governing Manitoba.

In the 1870s, Fort Garry consisted of two distinct settlements. The first site was named Upper Fort Garry, and the secondary site was named Lower Fort Garry, 32 kilometres (20 mi) downstream on the Red River. After the territorial government moved, Fort Garry continued to be the seat of government for Manitoba, and for the now defunct District of Keewatin territory between 1876 and 1905. Fort Garry evolved to become modern-day Winnipeg, still the capital of Manitoba, with Lower Fort Garry being declared a national historical site.

== Fort Livingstone (1876–1877) ==
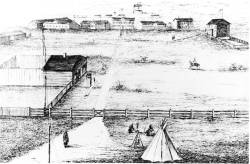
Sketch of Fort Livingstone circa 1877

The North-West Territories Act, 1875 dissolved the Temporary North-West Council and appointed a permanent government to take effect on October 7, 1876. The new council governed from Fort Livingstone, an outpost constructed west of the Manitoba border, in modern-day Saskatchewan. Fort Livingstone served as a small frontier outpost and not as a bona fide capital city. The location was chosen by the federal government as a temporary site to establish the new territorial government until the route of the railway was determined.

Fort Livingstone was founded in 1875 by the newly created North-West Mounted Police, the predecessor of the Royal Canadian Mounted Police, Canada's national police force. The Swan River North-West Mounted Police Barracks, inside Fort Livingstone, became the temporary assembly building for legislative-council sessions as well as the office for the Lieutenant Governor.

The bulk of the police forces moved out to Fort Macleod in 1876, to crack down on the whisky trade. A year later, Lieutenant Governor David Laird moved the seat of government to Battleford. The decision was based upon the original plans of constructing the Canadian Pacific Railway (CPR) through Battleford.

Fort Livingstone continued to serve as a small outpost until being totally destroyed by a prairie grass fire in 1884. The nearest modern settlement to the original Fort Livingstone site is Pelly, Saskatchewan, four kilometres (2.5 mi) to the south. The fort is sometimes referred to as Fort Pelly or Swan River. The Fort Livingstone site is marked with a plaque as was declared a Saskatchewan provincial heritage site and contains no resident population.

== Battleford (1877–1883) ==
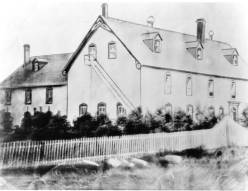
Government House in Battleford, the first permanent Northwest Territories legislature building.

The Northwest Territories government moved to Battleford in 1877 on the order of the Lieutenant Governor. Battleford was supposed to be the permanent capital of the Territories. The town was chosen because it was expected to be linked with the Canadian Pacific Railway.

The government in Battleford would see significant milestones towards attaining responsible government for the Northwest Territories. For the first time, the territory had democratically elected members join the appointed members in the assembly. Elections in the territory became a reality after the passage of the Northwest Territories election ordinance 1880. The first election took place in 1881, after electoral districts were created by royal proclamations, issued the order of the Lieutenant Governor. Battleford hosted the first official royal visit in western Canada, when the Marquis of Lorne and Princess Louise Caroline Alberta toured the territories in 1881.

The first Northwest Territories legislature building, and residence for the Lieutenant Governor named "NWT Government House", was completed and used by the territorial government until 1883. After the government moved the building stood as a historical site until it was destroyed in a fire in 2003.

After consultation with Canadian Pacific Railway officials, Lieutenant Governor Edgar Dewdney made the decision to move the capital to Regina, also in present-day Saskatchewan, in June 1882. The decision to move the capital was controversial because Dewdney owned real estate in Regina, and was accused of having a conflict of interests between his private affairs and the needs of the government.

== Regina (1883–1905) ==
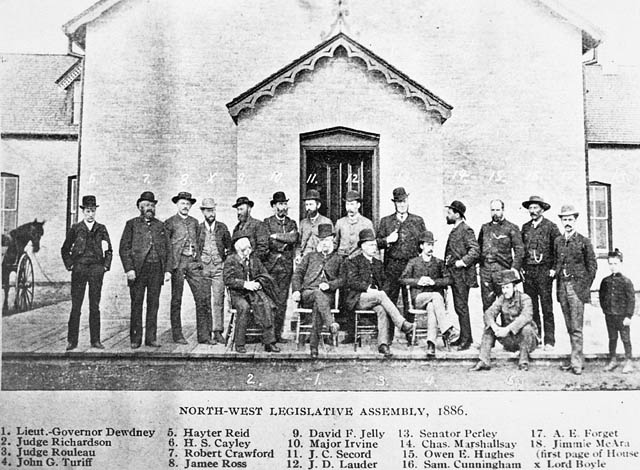
Members of the Legislative Assembly stand outside the legislature in Regina circa 1886.

After Dewdney ordered that the government be moved south to meet the railway in Regina, it was confirmed as the new territorial capital on March 27, 1883. Construction of a new legislature began. In Regina, the government continued to grow as the size of the settlement increased rapidly. The legislature had the most sitting members in Northwest Territories history after the fifth general election in 1902.

The government in Regina struggled to deliver services to the vast territory. The influx of settlers and responsibility for the Klondike, as well as constant fighting with the federal government over limited legislative powers and minimal revenue collection, hampered the effectiveness of government. The government during this period slowly released powers to the elected members. In 1897, after control of the executive council was ceded to elected members from the Lieutenant-Governors, a short-lived period of party politics evolved that challenged the consensus model of government that had been used since 1870.

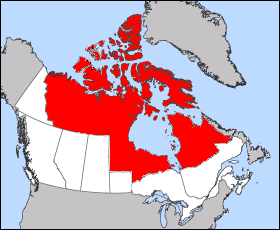
The remaining parts of Northwest Territories are highlighted in red, after the 1905 boundary changes.

The territorial government under the leadership of Premier Frederick Haultain struck a deal with the federal Government of Canada in early 1905 to bring provincial powers to the territories. This led to the creation of the provinces of Saskatchewan and Alberta from the southernmost and most populous areas of the territory. The Northwest Territories, reduced to its northern, lightly populated hinterland, continued to exist under the 1870s constitutional status under control of the federal government. A new council was convened in Ottawa, Ontario, to deal with the region.

The Territorial Administration Building was declared a historical site by the Saskatchewan government after it was restored by the Saskatchewan Government in 1979, the building remains standing to this day. The territorial government would not have another permanent legislature of its own design until 1993. After 1905, Regina continued to serve as capital for the province of Saskatchewan.

== Ottawa (1905–1967) ==
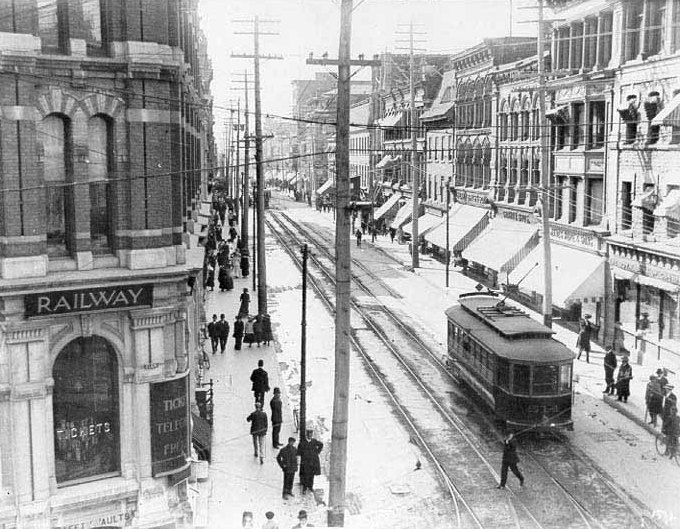
Thousands of miles from the Territories, the government was run from Sparks Street in Ottawa for 62 years.

In 1905, under the direction of Wilfrid Laurier, the Northwest Territories seat of government was moved to Ottawa, Ontario, the capital of Canada. This change was made when Northwest Territories defaulted back to the 1870 constitutional status after Alberta and Saskatchewan were sectioned off from the territory on September 1, 1905. After the populated regions of the territory were made into their own jurisdictions, there were very few settlements left in the territory with any significant population or infrastructure. The non-Inuit population was estimated to total around 1,000. Inuit were not counted at the time because they had no status under Canadian law, and were not yet settled in towns or villages.

In the period without a sitting council from 1905 to 1921, the government of the Territories was small but still active. A small civil service force was sent to Fort Smith to set the town up as the new administrative capital in 1911. A budget to provide minimal services was still given by the federal government. Commissioner Frederick D. White administered the territories day-to-day operations during that period. During this 16-year lapse in legislative government, no new laws were created, and the Territories and its population were severely neglected even with the services provided at the time.

The first session of the new council was called to order in 1921, a full 16 years after the government was dissolved in Regina. This new government contained no serving member who was resident in the Territories. The council during this period was primarily composed of high-level civil servants who lived and worked in Ottawa. The first person to sit on the council since 1905 who actually resided from within the Territories was John G. McNiven who was appointed in 1947.

The Ottawa-based council eventually grew sensitive to the needs of the territory residents. Democracy returned to the territories in the sixth general election in 1951. After the election, the council was something of a vagabond body, with alternating sittings in Ottawa, and various communities in Northwest Territories. The council held meetings in school gymnasiums, community halls, board rooms, or any suitable infrastructure. The council even transported ceremonial implements to conduct meetings with such as the speakers chair and mace. Both are traditional artifacts common to Westminster style parliaments.

Legislative sessions held in Ottawa were conducted in an office building on Sparks Street. The Northwest Territories government continues to hold an office in Ottawa on Sparks Street to this day. In 1965, a federal government commission was set up to determine a new home for the government and the future of the territory. The seat of government was moved back inside the territories to Yellowknife, after it was selected capital in 1967.

== Fort Smith (1911–1967) ==
Fort Smith became the official administration and transportation hub for the Northwest Territories in 1911. This marked the first services provided by the territorial government in six years. The first services included an agent from the Department of Indian Affairs, a medical doctor, and a Royal Canadian Mounted Police station.

Fort Smith was chosen to house the civil service because of its geographical location and state of development. The community was one of the few that had steamboat service from the railheads in Alberta and access to the vast waterways in the territory. The community was the easiest for the government to access, and the most well developed community, closest to Ottawa.

Fort Smith housed the civil service working in the Territories officially until 1967. The town continued to host the civil service for many years after Yellowknife was picked as capital, because the infrastructure was not yet in place in the new capital city at the time.

== Carrothers Commission (1965-1967) ==
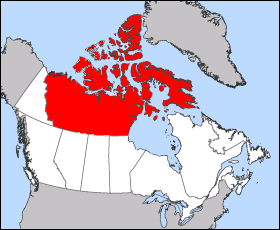
The Carrothers Commission decided the logical place for a new capital was near the geographical centre of the territory. This map shows the 1912 to 1999 boundaries.

The "Advisory Commission on the Development of Government in the Northwest Territories", commonly called the Carrothers Commission for its chair, Alfred Carrothers, was struck by the Government of Canada in 1965. The Carrothers Commission marked a significant turning point in modern Northwest Territories history. The Carrothers Commission was tasked to evaluate and recommend changes to the Northwest Territories to deal with an array of outstanding issues regarding self-government in the north. One of the more visible and lasting effects of the Carrothers Commission was to choose a new capital city for the territorial government.

The Carrothers Commission, for the first time, gave some voice to residents in the Northwest Territories through extensive consultations with the territorial population. In prior years, the decision to change the seat of government had always been made without consulting Northwest Territories residents. After the territorial government moved to Ottawa, the government was often resented for being so far away.

The Carrothers Commission spent two years visiting nearly every community in the territory and consulting with residents, community leaders, business people, and territorial politicians. The Carrothers Commission investigated and considered five communities for the capital: Hay River, Fort Simpson, Fort Smith, Inuvik and Yellowknife.

Many people in the Northwest Territories believed that Fort Smith would win since it already housed the Territories' civil service.

== Yellowknife (1967–present) ==
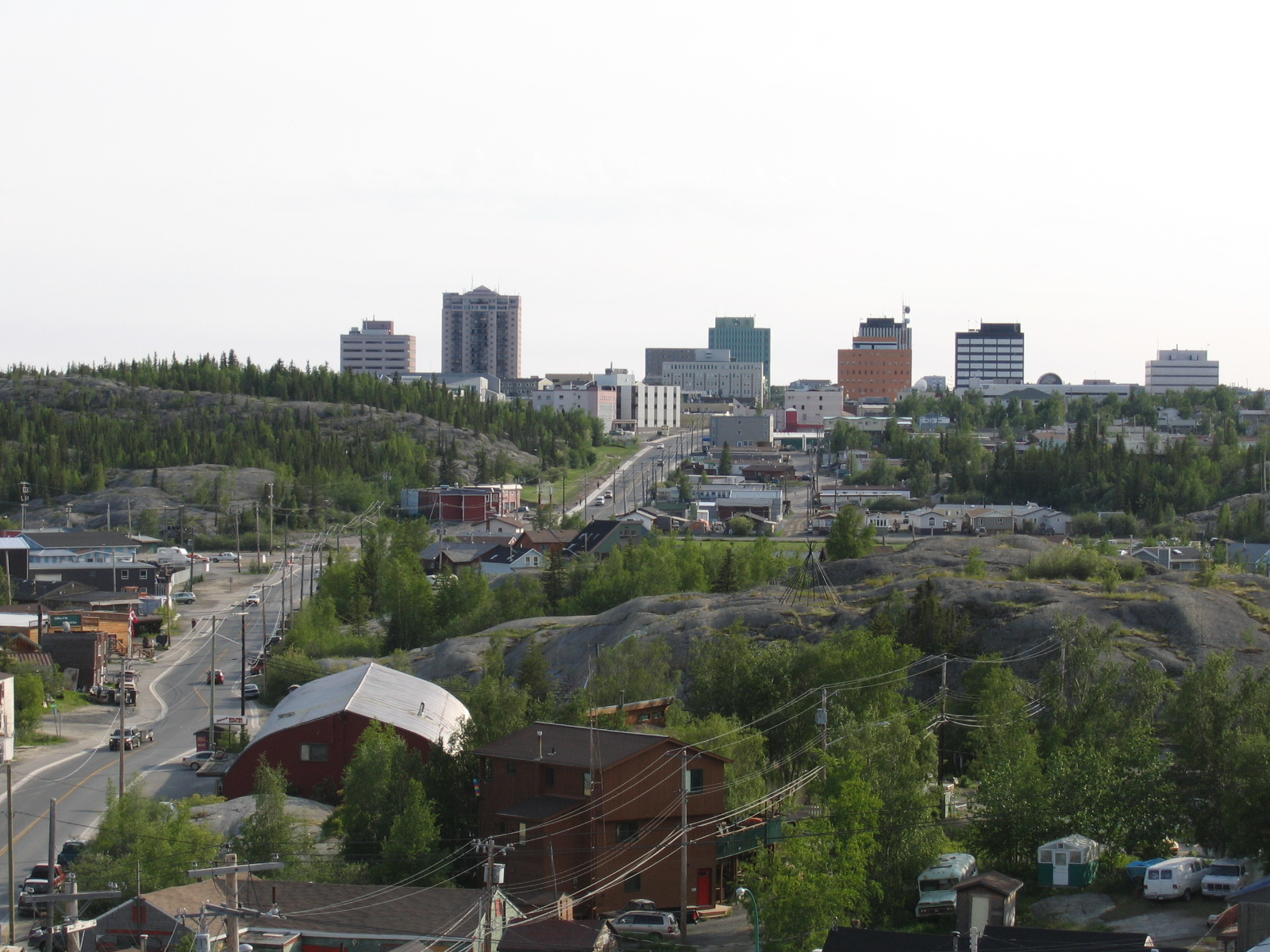
Downtown Yellowknife

Yellowknife officially became the capital on September 18, 1967, after the Carrothers commission chose it for its central location, transportation links, industrial base and residents' preferences.

Yellowknife, in 1967, was not yet ready to serve as home for the government. During the years that it took for the capital's infrastructure to slowly develop, most of the civil service remained in Fort Smith for many years and the governing Council continued its practice of holding legislative sessions all over the territory for a number of years.

The Northwest Territories marked a new era when the legislative council moved into a newly constructed legislature building on November 17, 1993. The new legislature was the first building built specifically for the Northwest Territories government since the government sat in Regina 88 years earlier. The legislature building was constructed to feature themes derived from the Inuit culture, which signaled that the government was sensitive to the ethnicity of the resident population.

The modern day territorial government has matured in Yellowknife to become effective and responsible. The government in Yellowknife had largely gained back its powers on par with the pre-1905 government that was dissolved during creation of Alberta and Saskatchewan. The civil service has been effectively consolidated into the city of Yellowknife; and has gained control over administering its own elections from Elections Canada. Education is now under the jurisdiction of the territorial government and the territory has most powers afforded to the rest of the provinces. There has even talk by the Federal government of the territories gaining provincial status in the future.

== Lessons learned for Nunavut capital (1995 vote) ==
As chronicled above, all seven capitals throughout the history of the Northwest Territories were chosen by some form of external government decision, though the Carrothers Commission did consult with the territorial population to guide its decision.

After the selection of Yellowknife as the capital in 1967, many residents in the eastern Arctic continued to feel unrepresented by the territorial government, and many movements and groups were formed to remedy the situation. Lessons had been learned from the historical changes in the Northwest Territories' seat of power, resulting in a number of territorial democratic processes leading to the creation of the new territory of Nunavut in 1999, formed from the eastern half of the Northwest Territories.

In 1976, as part of the land claims negotiations between the Inuit Tapiriit Kanatami population and the Government of Canada, the parties discussed division of the Northwest Territories to provide a separate territory for the Inuit. In 1982, a plebiscite on division was held throughout the Northwest Territories, in which a majority of the residents voted in favour of division.

The land claims agreement was completed in September 1992 and ratified by a majority of voters. On July 9, 1993, the Nunavut Land Claims Agreement Act and the Nunavut Act were passed by the Canadian Parliament.

In December, 1995, the Nunavut capital plebiscite was held, and the voters in the future Nunavut territory chose Iqaluit as their capital city, defeating Rankin Inlet. Iqaluit became the official capital on April 1, 1999, when Nunavut separated from the Northwest Territories.

== See also ==
- Commissioners of the Northwest Territories
- List of Northwest Territories general elections
- List of premiers of the Northwest Territories
- List of Northwest Territories Legislative Assemblies
