= Stuart Wood (police commissioner) =

RCMP commissioner

Stuart Taylor Wood CMG

Commissioner of the Royal Canadian Mounted Police
- In office March 6, 1938 – April 30, 1951
- Preceded by: Sir James MacBrien
- Succeeded by: Leonard Nicholson

Personal details
- Born: October 17, 1889 Napanee, Ontario, Canada
- Died: January 4, 1966 (aged 76) Regina, Saskatchewan, Canada

Stuart Zachary Taylor Wood, CMG (October 17, 1889 – January 4, 1966) served as the ninth Commissioner of the Royal Canadian Mounted Police, from March 6, 1938 to April 30, 1951.

== Early life and career ==
Born in Napanee, Ontario, Wood's father, Zachary Taylor Wood, CMG served in the North-West Mounted Police from 1885 to 1915 and was Acting Commissioner of the Force.

Wood attended the Royal Military College of Canada in Kingston, Ontario where he graduated in 1912. Shortly after he secured a commission in the RNW Mounted Police and served with the Force until his retirement in 1951, almost forty years.

Wood himself served in World War I as a lieutenant in the cavalry in France and Belgium. He served in the Yukon upon returning to Canada in 1919 as Justice of the Peace, Coroner, Sheriff, Game Inspector and Customs Officer.

== Reforms ==
When Wood became an Acting Royal Canadian Mounted Police commissioner he initiated many changes. Through 1945 and 1946 he established a system of registration for aliens, and dealt with espionage cases. In the North, he recruited new policing detachments. He organized a permanent Royal Canadian Mounted Police Band, (later disbanded by Commissioner Inkster in 1994). He established the first RCMP scientific laboratory and museum in Regina, Saskatchewan.

Wood also established a horse breeding station at Fort Walsh. He improved wireless communication and broadcasting and instituted a preventive policing program for youth. He negotiated provincial policing contracts for Newfoundland and British Columbia. Under his leadership the RCMP force grew gradually and scientific methods of crime detection improved enhancing law enforcement and crime prevention. Wood retired from the RCMP in 1951 and died in 1966. He was buried in Regina, Saskatchewan.

== PROFUNC ==
In the 1950s Wood was responsible for compiling a "blacklist" called PROFUNC, which was a Government of Canada top secret plan to identify and detain communist sympathizers during the height of the Cold War.

In October 2010, a joint CBC/Radio-Canada investigation revealed that information gathered under PROFUNC have most probably been used during the 1970 October Crisis, when Canada invoked the War Measures Act and suspended civil liberties in Canada.

== Personal life ==
Wood was the great-great grandson of U.S. President Zachary Taylor. Zachary's third daughter, Anne, married Robert C. Wood, a U.S. Regular Army surgeon, who served the Union during the Civil War, though their two sons served the Confederacy. One of their sons, John Taylor Wood, had been an officer in the U.S. Navy, but with the outbreak of the Civil War resigned, later joining the Confederate Marine Corps, and later served as an officer on board the famed ironclad CSS Virginia during her encounter with the USS Monitor. He afterwards became a lieutenant colonel in the Confederate Army. After the war John Taylor Wood relocated to Canada.

Wood is the nephew of RMC Graduate No. 352, British Army Lieutenant Charles Carroll Wood (1876-1899), who died of wounds in South Africa in 1899 as a member of the Loyal Regiment (North Lancashire) during the Second Boer War.

Wood's three sons and two daughters, Donald Zachary Taylor Wood (KIA, 1944), Constables John Taylor Wood II and Theodore Herschel Taylor Wood, also served on the Force. His son Herschel was killed on duty in 1950. Both Herschel and his father are buried in the RCMP Depot in Regina. Wood's son John retired from the RCMP as Inspector in 1988.

Police appointments
Preceded by James Howden MacBrien	Commissioner of the Royal Canadian Mounted Police; 1938-1951	Succeeded by Leonard Nicholson
