= Daryl Dolynny =

Canadian politician

Member of the Legislative Assembly of the Northwest Territories
- In office October 3, 2011 – 2015
- Preceded by: Sandy Lee
- Succeeded by: Caroline Cochrane
- Constituency: Range Lake

Personal details
- Born: 1966 (age 59–60)
- Occupation: pharmacist

Daryl Dolynny (born 1966) is a former Canadian politician, who was elected to the Legislative Assembly of the Northwest Territories in the 2011 election. He represented the electoral district of Range Lake.

A pharmacist, Dolynny operated a Shoppers Drug Mart franchise in Yellowknife prior to his election to the legislature.

Dolynny is of French and Ukrainian descent.
