= Marie Wilson (journalist) =

Canadian journalist and public administrator

Marie Wilson CM ONWT MSC
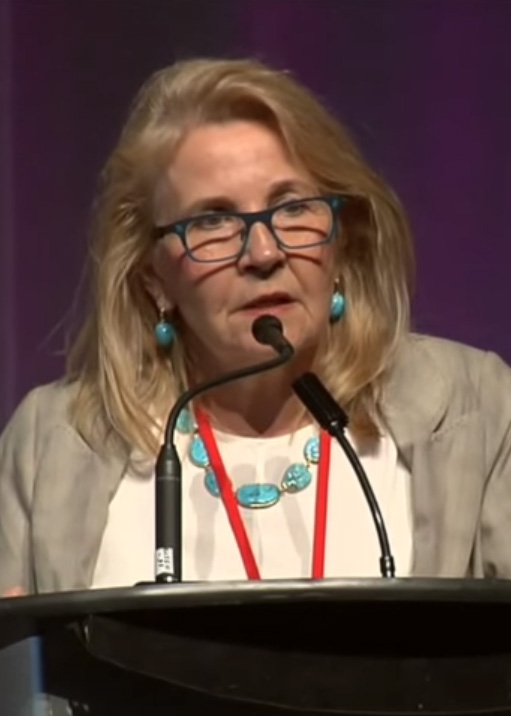
- Wilson in 2015
- Born: Petrolia, Ontario, Canada
- Education: University of Western Ontario
- Occupations: Journalist; public administrator
- Office: Truth and Reconciliation Commissioner (2009–2015)
- Spouse: Stephen Kakfwi

Marie Wilson is a Canadian journalist and public administrator who served as one of three commissioners of the Truth and Reconciliation Commission of Canada (TRC). Born in Petrolia, Ontario, Wilson holds a Bachelor of Arts degree in French language and literature and a Master of Arts degree in journalism, both from the University of Western Ontario. She spent over 35 years working in journalism for the Canadian Broadcasting Corporation, including as regional director for CBC North and as adviser to the South African Broadcasting Corporation. In 2015, she served as a professor of practice at McGill University. Prior to her appointment to the TRC, she was employed by the Workers' Safety and Compensation Commission of the Northwest Territories as vice president for operations.

The sole non-Indigenous TRC commissioner, she worked for over six years documenting the history and lasting impacts of the Canadian Indian residential school system. Wilson has received multiple awards and recognition for her work. She was appointed to the Order of Canada and the Order of the Northwest Territories in 2017. In addition, she is the recipient of the Meritorious Service Cross, a Queen Elizabeth II Diamond Jubilee Medal, the CBC North Award for Lifetime Achievement, a Northerner of the Year Award, the Calgary Peace Prize, and honorary doctorates from St. Thomas University, the Atlantic School of Theology, and the University of Manitoba.

Wilson has three children with her husband Stephen Kakfwi, former Dene Nation Chief and Premier of the Northwest Territories.
