= Silas Arngna'naaq =

Canadian politician

Silas Arngna'naaq is a Canadian politician from Baker Lake, Nunavut. He was a member of the Legislative Assembly of the Northwest Territories. He served as the Minister of Renewable Resources for the Government of the Northwest Territories.

Arngna'naaq was elected to the Kivallivik electoral district in the 1991 Northwest Territories general election. He defeated two term incumbent Gordon Wray to win the Kivallivik electoral district. Arngna'naaq ran for a second term in office in the 1995 Northwest Territories general election but was defeated by candidate Kevin O'Brien.

As of 14 April 2010, he was the Acting Senior Consumer Affairs Officer for the Government of Nunavut.

Legislative Assembly of the Northwest Territories
Preceded by Gordon Wray	MLA Kivallivik; 1991-1995	Succeeded by Kevin O'Brien
