= Gordon Wray =

Gordon Wray may refer to:

- Gordon Wray (The Bill), a character on the British TV series The Bill
- Gordon Wray (politician) (1951–2009), politician in the Northwest Territories Legislature, Canada
