= 1960 Northwest Territories general election =

The 1960 Northwest Territories general election took place on September 19, 1960.

In this election three members of the general public were randomly chosen and appointed to the council.

== Appointed members ==
4th Northwest Territories Council
Member	New/Re-appointed
Denis Coolican	New
Wilfred Brown	Re-appointed
L.A. Desrochers	New
H.M. Jones	New
I. Norman Smith	New

== Elected members ==
For complete electoral history, see individual districts

4th Northwest Territories Council
District	Member
Mackenzie Delta	Knut Lang
Mackenzie North	E.J. Gall
Mackenzie River	John Goodall
Mackenzie South	A.P Carey
