= 16th Northwest Territories Legislative Assembly =

16th Assembly

Type
- Type: Unicameral

History
- Established: October 1, 2007
- Disbanded: October 3, 2011
- Preceded by: 15th Northwest Territories Legislative Assembly
- Succeeded by: 17th Northwest Territories Legislative Assembly
- Seats: 19

Elections
- Last election: 2007

Meeting place
- Yellowknife

The 16th Northwest Territories Legislative Assembly was the 24th sitting legislature in Northwest Territories history. The membership of this Assembly was decided by the 2007 Northwest Territories general election held on October 1, 2007 to elect 19 members.

Despite attempts by political parties to run candidates for the legislature, the legislature is nonpartisan and has been since 1905. The members met in October to choose the Premier, Speaker and the Cabinet. Under the territory's consensus government system, Floyd Roland was chosen as the new Premier on October 17, 2007.

The NWT has set in place legislation that ensures elections are held every four years on the first Monday in October and the next election was held October 3, 2011.

== Membership ==
=== Members elected in the general election ===
Constituency	Member	First elected / previously elected	No. of terms
Deh Cho	Michael McLeod	1999	3rd term
Frame Lake	Wendy Bisaro	2007	1st term
Great Slave	Glen Abernethy	2007	1st term
Hay River North	Paul Delorey	1999	3rd term
Hay River South	Jane Groenewegen	1995	4th term
Inuvik Boot Lake	Floyd Roland	1995	4th term
Inuvik Twin Lakes	Robert C. McLeod	2004	2nd term
Kam Lake	Dave Ramsay	2003	2nd term
Mackenzie Delta	David Krutko	1995	4th term
Monfwi	Jackson Lafferty	2005	2nd term
Nahendeh	Kevin A. Menicoche	2003	2nd term
Nunakput	Jackie Jacobson	2007	1st term
Range Lake	Sandy Lee	1999	3rd term
Sahtu	Norman Yakeleya	2003	2nd term
Thebacha	Michael Miltenberger	1995	4th term
Tu Nedhe	Tom Beaulieu	2007	1st term
Weledeh	Bob Bromley	2007	1st term
Yellowknife Centre	Robert Hawkins	2003	2nd term
Yellowknife South	Bob McLeod	2007	1st term

=== Membership changes ===
Date	Member	District	Reason
March 26, 2011	Sandy Lee	Range Lake	Resigned to run for a seat in the 2011 Canadian federal election
