= PROFUNC =

Top-secret Canadian government project

PROFUNC, an acronym for "prominent functionaries of the communist party", was a top secret Government of Canada project to identify and observe suspected Canadian communists and crypto-communists during the height of the Cold War.

In operation from 1950 to 1983, the goal of the program was to allow for quick internment of known and suspected communist sympathizers in the event of war with the Soviet Union or its allies.

== History ==
With the 1945 Gouzenko Affair occurring in Canada, which was a main contributor to the start of the Cold War and the threat of the Korean War becoming the precursor for a Third World War, the Government of Canada in 1950 determined a need to create a blacklist of potential subversives. This was made the responsibility of the Royal Canadian Mounted Police's (RCMP) Special Branch, later the name was changed to the RCMP Security Service.

In the 1950s, RCMP Commissioner Stuart Wood had a "PROFUNC list" of approximately 16,000 suspected communists and 50,000 suspected communist sympathizers. These lists dictated who the Special Branch would observe and potentially intern in a national security state of emergency, such as a Third World War crisis with the Soviet Union and People's Republic of China.

Well into the 1960s, the plan was to re-use and refurbish World War II era internment camps for those on the PROFUNC list.

A separate arrest document, known formally as a C-215 form, was written up for each potential internee and updated regularly with personal information until the 1980s, including but not limited to: age, physical descriptions, photographs, vehicle information. In addition, more obscure information such as potential escape routes from the individual's personal residence were noted. Several prominent Canadians are suspected of being on the PROFUNC list including: Winnipeg alderman Jacob Penner, Roland Penner and the founder of the New Democratic Party of Canada Tommy Douglas.

It is suspected that the PROFUNC blacklist was used to increase the number of people detained as Front de libération du Québec (FLQ) suspects during the 1970 October Crisis, in contravention of the presumption of innocence, many of whom had no affiliation with the FLQ.

The Canadian Penitentiary Service received an updated PROFUNC list from the RCMP in 1971 to make them aware of the number of potential internees.

In the early 1980s Solicitor General of Canada Bob Kaplan caused PROFUNC to become defunct by introducing administrative changes entailing the RCMP to discontinue whatever was contributing to some elderly Canadians encountering problems while attempting to cross the Canada–United States border. Kaplan claimed to have had no knowledge of PROFUNC itself until he was advised of it by journalists in 2010 and that he was dismayed by its existence, stating "I just can’t believe it had any government authorization behind it".

== M-Day and internment ==
Mobilization Day (M-Day) was to be the day, in the event of a perceived national security crisis, police services would arrest and transport people noted on the PROFUNC list and temporarily detain them in reception centres across Canada including: Casa Loma, a country club in Port Arthur, Ontario and Regina Exhibition Park, then they would be transferred to penitentiaries.

The men would be interned across Canada, the women would be interned in one of two facilities in the Niagara Peninsula or Kelowna and the children would be sent to relatives or interned with their parents.

Strict punishment regulations awaited the internees if they broke the rules, including being held indefinitely and shot when caught while attempting a prison escape.

== Aftermath ==
The existence of the program was revealed in a January 24, 2000, news story by Dean Beeby of The Canadian Press. In October 2010, the PROFUNC plan was discussed at length in a television documentary by the Canadian Broadcasting Corporation's The Fifth Estate and Enquête.

It was not until 2010 that some Canadians, their family and friends learned for the first time that they were deemed a potential enemy of the state by the Government of Canada and law enforcement in Canada. Canadians who want to determine if they or a family member were in the PROFUNC files can make a disclosure request to the Federal Government of Canada through the Privacy Act or the Access to Information Act.

== See also ==
- COINTELPRO, a similar American program to gather intelligence on groups deemed subversive
- Orwell's list
