= Bible translations into Cree =

Bible translations into Cree can be subdivided by dialect of the Cree language. The main dialects are Plains Cree language, Woods Cree language, Swampy Cree language, Moose Cree language, Northern East Cree language, Southern East Cree language, Kawawachikamach, Atikamekw language and the Montagnais language (Western Innu and Eastern Innu).

== Atikamekw ==
New Testament, 2014.

== Eastern Cree (Northern dialect) ==
Bible portions, 1921

== Eastern Cree (Southern dialect) ==
New Testament, 2001

== Plains Cree ==
Methodist, later Anglican, William Mason and his wife Sophia Thomas Mason's work comprises several editions of the Gospel of St John in the Plains Cree dialect made between 1851 and 1857, the complete New Testament in 1859, and the whole Bible in 1861–62. An audio version of the Mason New Testament was recorded by the first-language Cree-speaker Rev. Fred Evans in 2017-19.

Anglican Archdeacon James Hunter's version of three of the Gospels in the same Plains Cree language appeared in 1853-55 (reprinted in 1876–77).

As of 2014, work on a contemporary Plains Cree translation had been ongoing since the 1980s.

== Moose Cree ==
Anglican Bishop John Horden's Four Gospels in Moose Cree was printed in 1859, and his complete New Testament in 1876.

== Western Cree ==
Archdeacon MacKay's 1908 Revision into Western/Plains Cree.

More recently Stan Cuthand translated the New Testament and about half of the Old Testament into Western Cree. Margaret Ducharme, Hazel Wuttunee, and Ethel Ahenakew are also working on this project. Bob Bryce was the team coordinator. It is undergoing final checking before publication.

In the final decades of the 20th century the Canadian Bible Society, working in partnership with the Cree Nation, the Church and other partners – including the Summer Institute of Linguistics – began working on a new Cree Bible. Reverend Stan Cuthand, a Cree elder, Anglican priest and an expert in his language has been the lead translator on the project, working closely with several Cree people and with the support of Canadian Bible Society consultant Ruth Heeg. Progress on this new translation has been slow due in part to the lack of adequate resources to complete the quality assurance process. The Easter story from the Gospel of Luke was published in a Latin alphabet and issued with a CD. The Old Testament Book of Ruth was published in a parallel-script format that presented Cree syllabics and Latin on facing pages. The subsequent Gospel of Mark was also in a parallel script format with a CD.

== Textual comparison ==
Translation	John 3:16
Horden, 1876 (Moose)	ᐌᓴ ᑭᒋᒪᓂᑐ ᐁᔅᐱᒋ ᓵᑭᑖᑦ ᐊᔅᑭᓕᐤ, ᑭ ᒥᓕᐌᐤ ᑳ ᐯᔭᑯᓕᒋ ᐅᑯᓱᓴ, ᒥᓱᐌ ᑕᑐ ᐊᐌᓕᐗ ᑳ ᑖᐺᔦᓕᒫᓕᒋ ᐁᑳ ᑭᒋ ᓂᔑᐗᓈᑎᓯᓕᒋ, ᒫᑲ ᑭᒋ ᐗᔮᓕᒋ ᑳᑭᑫ ᐱᒫᑎᓯᐎᓂᓕᐤ᙮
Hunter, 1876 (Eastern/Swampy)	Weya Muneto ā ispee̔che saketa̔pun uske, ke̔ mākew oo pāuko-Koosisana, piko una tapwā̔towayitche numoweya oo ga nissewunatisse̔ty, maka oo ga aya̔ty kakekā pimatissewin.
Mackay 1908 (Western/Plains)	
