= 1954 Northwest Territories general election =

The 1954 Northwest Territories general election was held on September 7, 1954. It was the only provincial / territorial election held in Canada that year.

This election saw the number of elected candidates increase by one.

== Appointed members ==
2nd Northwest Territories Legislative Council
Member	New/Re-appointed
Louis Audette	Re-appointed
Leonard Nicholson	Re-appointed
William Clements	Re-appointed
Jean Boucher	New
Frank Cunningham^{*}	Re-appointed

Note:

- Frank Cunningham was also deputy commissioner.

== Elected members ==
For complete electoral history, see individual districts

2nd Northwest Territories Legislative Council
District	Member
Mackenzie Delta	Frank Carmichael
Mackenzie North	John Parker
Mackenzie River	John Goodall
Mackenzie South	Robert Poritt
