= Jim Antoine =

Canadian politician (born 1949)

8th Premier of the Northwest Territories
- In office December 10, 1998 – January 17, 2000
- Commissioner: Helen Maksagak; Daniel Joseph Marion
- Preceded by: Don Morin
- Succeeded by: Stephen Kakfwi

Member of the Legislative Assembly of the Northwest Territories
- In office October 15, 1991 – November 24, 2003
- Preceded by: Nick Sibbeston
- Succeeded by: Kevin Menicoche
- Constituency: Nahendeh

Personal details
- Born: 1949 (age 76–77) Fort Simpson, Northwest Territories, Canada

James L. Antoine (born 1949) is a former politician from the Northwest Territories, Canada. He served as a member of the Legislative Assembly of the Northwest Territories from 1991 to 2003. During his time in office he led the Northwest Territories government as the eighth premier of the Northwest Territories from 1998 to 2000. He has also served as Chief of the Liidlii Kue First Nation on four occasions from the 1970s to present.

== Early life ==
James L. Antoine was born in Fort Simpson, Northwest Territories, Canada in 1949. He attended his post secondary education at the University of Wisconsin and the University of Lethbridge graduating in 1988 with a management certificate. Prior to his career as Chief Liidlii Kue First Nation, Antoine operated a small private business in his home town.

== Political career ==
Antoine was first elected to the Legislative Assembly of Northwest Territories in the 1991 general election. He was re-elected to his second term in the 1995 general election by acclamation and chosen to enter cabinet with the portfolios of Public Works and Services, Transportation and Aboriginal Affairs.

=== Premier ===
Antoine was elected premier by his peers midway through the 13th Northwest Territories Legislative Assembly on December 10, 1998. He defeated Stephen Kakfwi who also vied for the top job. Antoine replaced acting Premier Goo Arlooktoo who was appointed after Premier Don Morin resigned due to conflict of interest allegations.

Antoine ran for a third term in office in the 1999 Northwest Territories general election. He defeated two other candidates including former MLA William Lafferty with over 60% of the popular vote to hold his seat.

Antoine was premier during the division that created Nunavut from the eastern half of the territory. He did not stand for re-election to the Premier position and instead was nominated to return to Cabinet. He served out the remainder of his term in office before retiring from territorial politics at the dissolution of the Assembly in 2003.

== Liidlii Kue First Nation ==
Antoine has served as leader of the Liidlii Kue First Nation on four separate occasions. His first time as Chief was from 1974 to 1977 and his second time from 1979 to 1985 and a third time from 1989 to 1991. He vacated his position to run in the 1991 Northwest Territories election.

In 2009 Antoine made a return to first nations leadership he ran for election and won his fourth stint in office defeating incumbent Chief Keyna Norwegian and three other candidates.
