= John Todd (politician) =

Canadian politician

John Todd is a former territorial level politician and Minister of Finance in the Northwest Territories government.

== Business ==
Todd is a popular business leader in northern Canada and is popular among the Inuit for using his private development corporation to help Rankin Inlet become a leading centre of commerce in Nunavut.

== Politics ==
Todd was first elected to the Northwest Territories Legislature in the 1991 Northwest Territories general election. He was re-elected to his second and final term in the Legislature. Todd served as Minister of Finance. He retired from Legislative politics in 1999 declining to run for the new Legislative Assembly of Nunavut when the territory was created in 1999.

As Finance Minister, Todd worked hard to help establish the Nunavut territorial government. He negotiated an initial transfer of $626 million with the Government of Canada that worked out to $22,000 for every person for the 1999 fiscal year in the Nunavut territory. Todd was also responsible for eliminating the Northwest Territories budget deficits.

== See also ==
- Politics of the Northwest Territories

Legislative Assembly of the Northwest Territories
Preceded by New District	MLA Keewatin Central; 1991-1999	Succeeded by District Abolished
