= 1995 Northwest Territories general election =

The 1995 Northwest Territories general election was held on October 16, 1995. This was the last election before the Northwest Territories was split in two with the creation of Nunavut.

The big issue this election was the division of the Northwest Territories assets to meet the April 1, 1999 deadline. Twenty four MLAs were elected, seven incumbents returned and one was acclaimed.

== Election results ==
The election was held in 24 constituencies with 24,568 ballots cast, a turnout of 75.43%.

Outgoing Premier Nellie Cournoyea did not run for re-election. She was replaced first by Don Morin, who resigned in November 1998 over conflict of interest allegations. Morin was replaced by an interim Premier, Goo Arlooktoo until December 1998, before Jim Antoine filled out the remainder of the term.

=== Election summary ===
Re-election Statistics
1991	1995	Did not run again	Defeated	Reelected
24	24	7	10	7

=== Candidates ===
Results by District
District	Winner	Second	Third	Fourth	Fifth	Sixth	Seventh	Eighth	Incumbent
Aivilik	Manitok Thompson; 274 (45.5%)	Marion T. Love; 240 (39.9%)	Donat Milortok; 88 (14.7%)						James Arvaluk
Amittuq	Mark Evaloarjuk; 308 (31.8%)	Caleb Sangoya; 304 (31.4%)	Titus Allooloo; 186 (19.2%)	Paul Haulli; 170 (17.6%)					Titus Allooloo
Baffin Central	Tommy Enuaraq; 294 (30.3%)	Lootie Toomasie; 186 (19.1%)	Sakiasie Sowdlooapik; 152 (15.6%)	Jaypeetee Akpalialuk; 105 (10.8%)	Jaypeetee Karpik; 90 (9.3%)	Pauloosie Paniloo; 74 (7.6%)	Rebecca Mike; 60 (6.2%)	Charlie Kalluk; 11 (1.1%)	Rebecca Mike
Baffin South	Goo Arlooktoo; 256 (33.3%)	Matthew Saveakjuk Jaw; 162 (21.1%)	Peter Kattuk; 128 (16.7%)	Walter Audla; 98 (12.8%)	Kenoayoak Pudlat; 74 (9.6%)	Akalayok Qavavau; 50 (6.5%)			Kenoayoak Pudlat
Deh Cho	Samuel Gargan; 333 (54.8%)	Joachim Bonnetrouge; 189 (31.1%)	Richard Lafferty; 86 (14.1%)						Samuel Gargan
Hay River	Jane Groenewegen; 696 (40.0%)	Ron Courtoreille; 654 (37.6%)	George Morion; 253 (14.5%)	Mansell Grey; 137 (7.9%)					John Pollard
High Arctic	Levi Barnabas; 135 (34.4%)	Elizabeth Allakariallak-Roberts; 90 (23.0%)	Aziz Kheraj; 89 (22.7%)	Larry Audlaluk; 78 (19.9%)					Ludy Pudluk
Inuvik	Floyd Roland; 683 (58.1%)	Fred Koe; 492 (41.9%)							Fred Koe
Iqaluit	Ed Picco; 695 (48.3%)	Mary Ekho-Wilman; 644 (44.8%)	Gordon McIntosh; 100 (6.9%)						Dennis Patterson
Keewatin Central	John Todd; 947 (82.5%)	Joseph Kaludjak; 201 (17.5%)							John Todd
Kitikmeot	Kelvin Ng; 792 (71.1%)	Ernie Bernhardt; 322 (28.9%)							Ernie Bernhardt
Kivallivik	Kevin O'Brien; 700 (54.4%)	David Simailak; 211 (16.4%)	Silas Arngna'naaq; 140 (10.9%)	David Aglukark; 120 (9.3%)	Sam Alagalak; 63 (4.9%)	Joy Suluk; 52 (4.0%)			Silas Arngna'naaq
Mackenzie Delta	David Krutko; 350 (45.3%)	Richard Nerysoo; 218 (28.2%)	Charles Furlong; 204 (26.4%)						Richard Nerysoo
Nahendeh	Jim Antoine acclaimed								Jim Antoine
Natilikmiot	John Ningark; 366 (52.0%)	Uriash Puqiqnak; 338 (48.0%)							John Ningark
North Slave	James Rabesca; 481 (42.5%)	Violet Camsell-Blondin; 204 (18.0%)	Leon Lafferty; 175 (15.5%)	Henry Zoe; 158 (14.0%)	Joseph Zoe; 67 (5.9%)	Isadore Zoe; 47 (4.2%)			Henry Zoe
Nunakput	Vince Steen; 395 (62.2%)	Eddie Dillon; 240 (37.8%)							Nellie Cournoyea
Sahtu	Stephen Kakfwi; 744 (70.0%)	George Cleary; 319 (30.0%)							Stephen Kakfwi
Thebacha	Michael Miltenberger; 607 (43.6%)	Jeannie Marie-Jewell; 571 (41.0%)	Sean Mageean; 119 (8.5%)	Allan Heron; 96 (6.9%)					Jeannie Marie-Jewell
Tu Nedhe	Don Morin; 372 (67.8%)	Archie Catholique; 119 (21.7%)	Larry Bearard; 58 (10.6%)						Don Morin
Yellowknife Centre	Jake Ootes; 249 (19.7%)	Arlene Hache; 231 (18.3%)	Dave Ramsay; 209 (16.6%)	Gary Boyd; 165 (13.1%)	Marie Coe; 162 (12.8%)	Roland Gosselin; 139 (11.0%)	Don Yamkowy; 108 (8.6%)		Brian Lewis
Yellowknife-Frame Lake	Charlie Dent; 446 (59.3%)	Rob Roman; 135 (18.0%)	David McCann; 122 (16.2%)	Tom Pagonis; 49 (6.5%)					Charlie Dent
Yellowknife North	Roy Erasmus; 686 (42.3%)	Jim Evoy; 334 (20.6%)	Clem Paul; 249 (15.4%)	Wally Larocque; 158 (9.8%)	Donna Hunt; 109 (6.7%)	Sandy Holmes; 56 (3.5%)	Louis Leonardis; 29 (1.8%)		Michael Ballantyne
Yellowknife South	Seamus Henry; 972 (41.6%)	Tony Whitford; 968 (41.4%)	Kirby Marshall; 399 (17.1%)						Tony Whitford
