= Fort Livingstone (Saskatchewan) =

Historic site and former capital of the North-West Territories, Canada

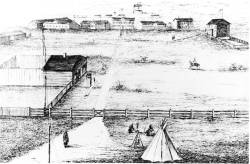
- Sketch of Fort Livingstone circa 1877
- Interactive map of Fort Livingstone
- Type: Fort, Military Structure
- Location: Pelly, Saskatchewan, Canada
- Nearest city: St. Philips No. 301

History
- Built: 1874
- Event(s): First capital of the North-West Territories 1876-1877; Former post of the North-West Mounted Police

Site notes
- Architect: Department of Public Works (Canada)
- Governing body: Parks Canada
- Website: Parks Canada official website

National Historic Site of Canada
- Designated: 1923

Fort Livingstone
- Location of Fort Livingstone in Saskatchewan
- Coordinates: 51°53′58″N 101°57′44″W

Fort Livingstone was founded as an outpost in North-West Territories, Canada. The outpost briefly served as the capital city for the North-West Territories government for the years of 1874 to 1876 until it moved to Battleford, Saskatchewan, and headquarters for the North-West Mounted Police for the same period, until they moved their headquarters to Fort Macleod, Alberta.

The site was designated a National Historic Site of Canada in 1923. It was also designated a provincial Protected Area in 1986.

The nearest inhabited site is Pelly, Saskatchewan.

== See also ==
- History of Northwest Territories capital cities
- List of protected areas of Saskatchewan
