= List of lieutenant governors of the North-West Territories =

This is a list of historical lieutenant governors of the North-West Territories, Canada. The position of Lieutenant Governor lasted from the acquisition of Rupert's Land and the North-Western Territory in 1869 to the creation of Alberta and Saskatchewan in 1905.

Since the establishment of Saskatchewan and Alberta from the Territories' most populated regions, the territory had no lieutenant governor. Instead, a commissioner represents the federal government and acts as the de facto representative of the King. Yukon was carved out of the North-West Territories in 1898 and has had its own commissioners since then.

Lieutenant governors of the North-West Territories
Name	From	To	Title
Sir William McDougall	September 28, 1869	May 10, 1870 (Note: Was unable to enter the North-West Territories, but returned to Ottawa, and campaigned against Manitoba becoming a province. He was listed as leader of the provisional North-West Territories government until Adams G. Archibald took over on May 10, 1870.)	Lieutenant Governor of Rupert's Land and the North-Western Territory
Sir Adams George Archibald	May 10, 1870	December 2, 1872	Lieutenant Governor of Manitoba and the North-West Territories
Sir Francis Godschall Johnson (Note: Appointed but never assumed office)	April 9, 1872	December 2, 1872	Lieutenant Governor of Manitoba and the North-West Territories
Alexander Morris	December 2, 1872	October 7, 1876	Lieutenant Governor of Manitoba and the North-West Territories
David Laird	October 7, 1876	December 3, 1881	Lieutenant Governor of the North-West Territories
Edgar Dewdney	December 3, 1881	July 1, 1888	Lieutenant Governor of the North-West Territories
Joseph Royal	July 1, 1888	October 31, 1893	Lieutenant Governor of the North-West Territories
Charles Herbert Mackintosh	October 31, 1893	May 30, 1898	Lieutenant Governor of the North-West Territories
Malcolm Colin Cameron	May 30, 1898	September 26, 1898	Lieutenant Governor of the North-West Territories
Amédée E. Forget	October 4, 1898	September 1, 1905	Lieutenant Governor of the North-West Territories

== See also ==
- Commissioners of Northwest Territories
- List of Northwest Territories premiers
- List of Northwest Territories general elections
