= Sandy Lee =

Canadian politician

Member of the Legislative Assembly of the Northwest Territories
- In office December 6, 1999 – March 26, 2011
- Preceded by: first member
- Succeeded by: Daryl Dolynny
- Constituency: Range Lake

Personal details
- Born: 1964 (age 61–62) South Korea
- Party: Conservative Party of Canada (Federal); Independent Conservative (Provincial)

Sandy Lee (born 1964) is a South Korean-born-Canadian lawyer and politician, who was a member of the Legislative Assembly of the Northwest Territories from 1999 to 2011.

== Political career ==
=== Territorial assembly ===
Lee was elected to the legislature for the first time in the 1999 Northwest Territories general election, defeating future MLA Dave Ramsay and four other candidates. She was re-elected to her second term in office in the 2003 Northwest Territories general election, winning 80.56 per cent of the vote with a landslide. She won her third election in the 2007 Northwest Territories general election with 72.59 per cent of votes. Lee was elected to the cabinet by the members of the assembly in November 2007 as per the consensus system of government; Lee was the Minister for Health and Social Services, Status of Women and Persons with Disabilities. She was also given the portfolio of Minister of Municipal and Community Affairs when MLA Norman Yakeleya resigned until a new minister was appointed.

=== 2011 federal election ===
On March 26, 2011, Lee, a former Liberal Party of Canada member, resigned as MLA and minister so she could run for the Conservatives in the Western Arctic (now the Northwest Territories electoral district) in the 2011 federal election.

Lee was appointed to run by the headquarters of the Conservative Party in Ottawa but faced opposition from some Western Arctic Conservative Association members. There was an attempt to add former MLA John Pollard

She did not win election to the House of Commons of Canada, losing to incumbent MP Dennis Bevington.

In 2015, she was appointed Director of Northern Affairs NWT by the government of then prime minister, Stephen Harper.
