= Stephen Kakfwi =

Canadian politician (born 1950)

9th Premier of the Northwest Territories
- In office January 17, 2000 – December 10, 2003
- Commissioner: Daniel Joseph Marion; Glenna Hansen
- Preceded by: Jim Antoine
- Succeeded by: Joe Handley

MLA for Sahtu
- In office October 5, 1987 – November 24, 2003
- Preceded by: John T'Seleie
- Succeeded by: Norman Yakeleya

Personal details
- Born: 1950 (age 75–76) Fort Good Hope, Northwest Territories
- Party: Independent
- Spouse: Marie Wilson

Stephen Kakfwi (born 1950) is a Canadian politician, who was the ninth premier of the Northwest Territories. His sixteen-year tenure in the cabinet of the Northwest Territories is the longest in the Territories' history.

== Early life ==
Stephen Kakfwi was born in 1950 in a traditional Dene bush camp at Fort Good Hope, Northwest Territories to full-blooded Slavey parents. His parents were non-status Slavey due to his grandfather waiving his treaty rights in order to own property and run a fur-trading business. At an early age, Kakfwi was sent away to residential schools in Inuvik, Yellowknife and Fort Smith. During the 1970s, Kakfwi attended the University of Alberta to complete a teacher's degree, but early in that decade he returned to his Fort Good Hope community during a time in which many Aboriginal Canadians were beginning to organize politically to demand recognition of their land and self-government rights.

== Political career ==
In the 1970s the Mackenzie Valley Pipeline was proposed. Kakfwi identified the danger this proposal posed to his community's homeland, and fought tirelessly against the proposal, organizing groups of Dene and Métis. Eventually, the Government of Canada established the Mackenzie Valley Pipeline Inquiry, commissioned by Justice Thomas R. Berger. The 1977-8 recommendations against building a pipeline through the Northwest Territories for the time being were considered by Kakfwi as a "political badge of honour".

In 1980 Kakfwi ran against Georges Erasmus for the Dene leadership, but lost. In 1983, Kakfwi again ran for the position of President of the Dene Nation and won, as Erasmus, his 1980 opponent, had been elected grand chief of the Assembly of First Nations. As President of the Dene Nation, Kakfwi established both the Northwest Territories Dene Cultural Institute and Indigenous Survival International (the latter was focused on hunting rights, particularly in the Arctic). He also aided in land rights efforts and helped to develop a framework for land claim negotiations. In 1984 and 1987, Pope John Paul II had scheduled visits to the Northwest Territories, an effort made possible by the work of Kakfwi. Although the 1984 visit was subsequently cancelled due to poor weather, Kakfwi continued to campaign for a visit in 1987.

In 1987, Kakfwi was elected to the Legislative Assembly of the Northwest Territories, representing the constituency of Sahtu, of 254,000 square kilometres in area. During his sixteen-year tenure in the Legislative Assembly, ending in 2003, Kakfwi played key roles in initiatives ranging from economic development by encouraging the creation of diamond cutting and polishing industries in close proximity to local diamond mines, through to his promotion of Aboriginal rights, especially during his term as Premier of the Northwest Territories from 2000 to 2003. His sixteen-year tenure in the cabinet of the Northwest Territories is the longest in the Territories' history. Kakfwi continues to play an active role in the development of the Northwest Territories through his advisory position to WWF Canada.

In 2014, he founded Canadians for a New Partnership, a coalition with a goal to build a new partnership between First Peoples and all Canadians.

In 2017, Kakfwi was appointed by Prime Minister Justin Trudeau to serve on the Supreme Court Advisory Board. The board's mandate was to recommend a successor to Chief Justice Beverley McLachlin before her retirement later that year.

== Awards ==
In 1997, Kakfwi was awarded the National Aboriginal Achievement Award for public service for his leadership role in Northern Canada.

In October 2013, he was awarded the Governor General's Northern Medal by David Johnston.

== Personal life ==
Kakfwi is married to Marie Wilson and has three children and four grandchildren.

Legislative Assembly of the Northwest Territories
Preceded by John T'Seleie	MLA Sahtu; 1987–2003	Succeeded by Norman Yakeleya
Preceded by Jim Antoine	Premier of Northwest Territories; 2000–2003	Succeeded by Joe Handley
