= Leonard Nicholson =

Canadian politician

Leonard Nicholson OC MBE GCStJ

10th Commissioner of the Royal Canadian Mounted Police
- In office 1951–1959
- Preceded by: Stuart Wood
- Succeeded by: Charles Rivett-Carnac

Personal details
- Born: June 8, 1904 Canada
- Died: March 22, 1983 (aged 78) Canada

Leonard Hanson Nicholson, OC, MBE, GCStJ (June 8, 1904 – March 22, 1983) served as the tenth Commissioner of the Royal Canadian Mounted Police, from May 1, 1951 to March 31, 1959.

Nicolson served with the RCMP from 1923 to 1927 (and again from 1932 to 1941), New Brunswick Provincial Police 1928–1930, Nova Scotia Police 1930–1932, then with the Canadian Army from 1941 to 1951.

Nicholson had only a primary school education leaving school to assist his family. He served as a Provost marshal in World War II.

He also served as deputy Chief Scout of Scouts Canada. In 1971, Nicholson was awarded the 71st Bronze Wolf, the only distinction of the World Organization of the Scout Movement, awarded by the World Scout Committee for exceptional services to world Scouting.

== Legacy ==
The Royal Canadian Mounted Police headquarters building in Ottawa, Ontario was named after Nicholson.

He is the highest-decorated RCMP officer in Canadian history and his medals are currently located at the RCMP headquarters in Regina. In 1955 he received an honorary LL.D. from the University of New Brunswick. In 1967 he was made an Officer of the Order of Canada. He was a Member of the Order of the British Empire (MBE). In 1967 as well he was inversted as Bailiff Grand Cross of the Canadian priory of the Venerable Order of Saint John.

Police appointments
Preceded by Stuart Wood	Commissioner of the Royal Canadian Mounted Police; 1951-1959	Succeeded by Charles Rivett-Carnac
