= Mackenzie North =

Former territorial electoral district in the Northwest Territories, Canada

Mackenzie North is a former territorial electoral district, that elected Members to the Northwest Territories Legislative Assembly. Mackenzie North covered the communities of Yellowknife, Bathurst Inlet, Fort Providence, Fort Rae, Snare River, Outpost Island, Hottah Lake, Port Radium, Coppermine, Matthews Lake, Giauque Lake, and Gros Cap.

== 1954 election ==
1954 Northwest Territories general election
Name	Vote	%
John Parker	403	32.98%
Peter Baker	338	27.66%
Neil J. Hutchins	314	25.70%
Charles Brandel Crate	167	13.66%
Total Valid Ballots	1,222	100%
Voter Turnout 60.48%	Rejected Ballots 19	

== 1951 election ==
1951 Northwest Territories general election
Name	Vote	%
Merv Hardie	778	65.21
James Guy Wheeler	317	26.57
John Murray McMeekan	98	8.22%
Total Valid Ballots	1,193	100%
Voter Turnout 59.94%	Rejected Ballots 40	

== See also ==
- List of Northwest Territories territorial electoral districts
- Canadian provincial electoral districts
