= Mackenzie River (territorial electoral district) =

Former territorial electoral district in the Northwest Territories, Canada

Mackenzie River is a former territorial electoral district, that elected Members to the Northwest Territories Legislative Assembly.

== 1954 election ==
1954 Northwest Territories general election
Name	Vote
John Goodall	Acclaimed

== See also ==
- Legislative Assembly of the Northwest Territories
- List of Northwest Territories territorial electoral districts
- Canadian provincial electoral districts
