= Floyd Roland =

Canadian politician

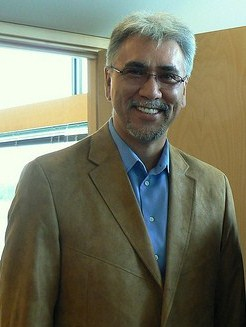
- Roland in 2006

11th Premier of the Northwest Territories
- In office October 17, 2007 – October 26, 2011
- Commissioner: Tony Whitford; George Tuccaro
- Preceded by: Joe Handley
- Succeeded by: Bob McLeod

Member of the Legislative Assembly of the Northwest Territories for Inuvik Boot Lake (Inuvik; 1995–1999)
- In office October 16, 1995 – October 3, 2011
- Preceded by: Fred Koe
- Succeeded by: Alfred Moses

Personal details
- Born: November 23, 1961 (age 64) Inuvik, Northwest Territories
- Party: Conservative

Floyd K. Roland (born November 23, 1961) is a politician from the Northwest Territories, Canada. He was the 11th premier of the Northwest Territories, having held office from October 17, 2007 to October 26, 2011.

Previously a town councillor and deputy mayor of Inuvik, Roland was first elected to the Legislative Assembly in the 1995 Northwest Territories general election, after defeating the incumbent candidate Fred Koe. He was re-elected in the 1999 Northwest Territories general election, winning in a landslide with 83% of the vote.

Roland was returned by acclamation in the 2003 Northwest Territories general election and acclaimed for a second time in the 2007 Northwest Territories general election, following which the members of the Legislature elected him Premier of the Northwest Territories on October 17, 2007.

His government survived a historic vote of no confidence on February 6, 2009 by a vote of 10 to 8, following allegations by a number of MLAs that he was refusing to communicate with them on major policy decisions, including changes to the territory's health benefits policy, a $34-million loan given to Discovery Air, approval of the $165-million Deh Cho Bridge, and plans to amalgamate a number of public services boards.

He faced renewed controversy in May 2009 when the territorial conflict of interest commissioner, Gerald Gerrand, ruled that there were reasonable grounds to believe that the affair constituted a breach of Roland's duties of office, including unconfirmed allegations that Patricia Russell passed on confidential information from legislative committee meetings to Roland.

Roland unsuccessfully ran in the 2015 federal election and is formerly President of the Western Arctic Conservative Association.

== Electoral history ==
2015 Canadian federal election: Northwest Territories
Party	Candidate	Votes	%	±%	Expenditures
Liberal	Michael McLeod	9,172	48.34	+29.90	$71,207.71
New Democratic	Dennis Bevington	5,783	30.48	–15.36	$37,599.86
Conservative	Floyd Roland	3,481	18.35	–13.76	$75,298.47
Green	John Moore	537	2.83	–0.23	none listed
Total valid votes/expense limit		18,973	99.45	–	$214,028.20
Total rejected ballots		104	0.55	–	
Turnout		19,077	63.36	–	
Eligible voters		30,110			
Liberal gain from New Democratic		Swing		+22.63	
Source: Elections Canada

=== 2007 election ===
2007 Northwest Territories general election
Name	Vote	%
Floyd Roland	Acclaimed	

In this election, no other candidate registered to run for this riding, so Floyd Roland was returned by acclamation.

=== 2003 election ===
2003 Northwest Territories general election
Name	Vote	%
Floyd Roland	Acclaimed	

In this election, no other candidate registered for this riding, so Floyd Roland was returned by acclamation.

=== 1999 election ===
1999 Northwest Territories general election
Name	Vote	%
Floyd Roland	350	83.33%
Mary Beckett	50	11.90%
Chris Garven	20	4.76%
Total Valid Ballots	420	100%
Voter Turnout 69.90%	Rejected Ballots 5	
