= 5th Northwest Territories Legislative Council =

5th Legislative Council

Type
- Type: Unicameral

History
- Established: 1964
- Disbanded: 1967
- Preceded by: 4th Northwest Territories Legislative Council
- Succeeded by: 6th Northwest Territories Legislative Council

Leadership
- Commissioner: Bent Gestur Sivertz since July 12, 1963
- Commissioner: Stuart Milton Hodgson since March 2, 1967
- Seats: 9 at election 12 at dissolution

Elections
- Last election: 1964

Meeting place
- Various communities and Ottawa

The 5th Northwest Territories Legislative Council was the 12th assembly of the territorial government. This council's members were elected and appointed in the 1964 general election and served until it was dissolved for the 1967 general election.

== Leadership ==
The incumbent Commissioner of the territory at the beginning of the council was Bent Gestur Sivertz. He left office on January 16, 1967, and was replaced by Deputy Commissioner Stuart Milton Hodgson on March 2, 1967.

The Deputy Commissioner at the beginning of the council was Wilfred G. Brown who left office on July 23, 1965. He was replaced by Hodgson in that role who then went on to replace Sivertz as Commissioner. Hodgson was replaced by John Havelock Parker who served as Deputy Commissioner from March 2, 1967, until dissolution.

== Legislation ==
=== First session ===
The first session of the 5th Council resulted in Royal Assent for 15 bills. Among the legislation was a $75 per month Old Age Pension allowance with additional living subsidies for disabled persons. There was a bill that allowed commercial sports to be played on Sunday, a bill appropriating $210,000 from the federal government to fund a first mortgage housing program and an increase in big game hunting quota's for the Mackenzie District.

The council also passed two motions without debate, the first introduced by appointed member Frank Vallee that called for an amendment to the Northwest Territories Act to increase council representation to 13 men with expansion of electoral districts to the east arctic. A second motion introduced by Robert Poritt called on the federal government to drop its plans to divide the Northwest Territories into two territories.

=== Third session ===
The third session was held in Resolute Bay commencing on October 31, 1966. The session included the new eastern arctic members of the council that had been elected in the September by-elections. This session was the first time since 1905 that elected members held a majority.

== Membership ==
District / position	Member	First Appointed / First elected /previously elected	No. of terms
Appointed Member	Wilfrid Brown	1957	3rd term
Appointed Member	Hugh Campbell	1964	1st term
Appointed Member	Robert Harvey	1964	1st term
Appointed Member	Stuart Hodgson	1964	1st term
Appointed Member	Abraham Okpik	1965	1st term
Appointed Member	Frank Vallee	1964	1st term
Central Arctic	Duncan Pryde	1966	1st term
Eastern Arctic	Simonie Michael	1966	1st term
Keewatin	Robert Williamson	1966	1st term
Mackenzie Delta	Lyle Trimble	1964	1st term
Mackenzie North	Peter Baker	1964	1st term
Mackenzie River	John Goodall	1954	4th term
Mackenzie South	Robert Porritt	1954, 1964	2nd term*

== Appointments ==
Date	Name	Appointed on the advice of	Notes
August 1, 1965	Stuart Milton Hodgson		Appointed Deputy Commissioner
October 18, 1965	Abraham Okpik	Lester Pearson	First Inuk member of the Council
March 2, 1967	John Havelock Parker		Appointed Deputy Commissioner

== By-elections ==
Date	District	Member	Reason
September 19, 1966	Central Arctic	Duncan Pryde	New electoral district
September 19, 1966	Eastern Arctic	Simonie Michael	New electoral district
September 19, 1966	Keewatin	Robert Williamson	New electoral district

A set of three historic by-elections took place on September 19, 1966. The Carrothers Commission recommended that electoral districts be established in the eastern arctic which had previously been unrepresented in council and disenfranchised from territorial voting.

The result was the creation of three electoral districts; Central Arctic, Eastern Arctic and Keewatin. A by-election was held on September 19, 1966. Only Eastern Arctic was contested which resulted in the first elected Inuk to serve on council who won in a three-way race. It would also mark the first time since elections were established in 1881 that the entire Northwest Territories had representation on council.
