= 1st Northwest Territories Legislative Council =

1st Legislative Council

Type
- Type: Unicameral

History
- Established: 1951
- Disbanded: 1954
- Preceded by: 2nd Council of the Northwest Territories
- Succeeded by: 2nd Northwest Territories Legislative Council
- Seats: 8

Elections
- Last election: 1951

Meeting place
- Various communities and Ottawa

The 1st Northwest Territories Legislative Council was the 8th assembly of the territorial government, lasting from the election on September 17, 1951 to dissolution in 1954. This council would see elected members returned it for the first time since 1905.

== Powers increase ==
Following the 1951 election, legislation to amend the Northwest Territories Act was introduced in the House of Commons to increase the powers of the council. Provisions in the legislation also allowed them to re-establish a territorial court of law, as well as provide for the appointment of a police magistrate and increase the living allowance for members of the council while it was in session to $25 from $15 a day and to keep the pay per session day at $50. The legislation also increased the number of elected seats to four and provided for a federally managed Reindeer Marketing Board to portion off reindeer herds to Inuit families to encourage establishment of reindeer farms. The federal government passed these initiatives to help assert arctic sovereignty and prevent the United States from taking over the north lands.

== Financial situation ==
In 1953 the territory recorded a budgetary surplus along with the Yukon. The inflow of cash came from government controlled liquor that netted over $150,000 to the treasury along with over $260,000 in federally collected taxes being returned to the territory. Other contributing sources were a 1 cent per gallon tax on all petroleum products, a fur export tax and various licensing fees.

== Membership ==
District / position	Member	First Appointed / First elected	No. of terms
Appointed Member	Louis Audette	1947	2nd term
Mackenzie South	James Brodie	1951	1st term
Mackenzie West	Frank Carmichael	1951	1st term
Appointed Member	William Clements	1951	1st term
Deputy Commissioner	Frank Cunningham	1951	2nd term
Mackenzie North	Mervyn Arthur Hardie	1951	1st term
Appointed Member	Donald McKay	1951	1st term
Appointed Member	Leonard Nicholson	1951	1st term

A total of eight members served on the council, with five appointed and three elected. The three elected all came from the District of Mackenzie while the five appointed lived in Ottawa. Previous to this council the last elected members sat in the 5th North-West Legislative Assembly.

Two appointed members of the council were returned from the 2nd Council of the Northwest Territories. They were Louis Audette and Deputy Commissioner Frank Cunningham who served by default as the presiding officer on the council. The Commissioner and leader of the government at the beginning of the council was Hugh Andrew Young who had served as such since 1950. Young left office on November 15, 1953, and his replacement Robert Gordon Robertson was appointed on the same day.

The only membership change in the council came in 1953 when Mervyn Hardie vacated his seat to run in the 1953 Canadian federal election. He won the district of Mackenzie River to be the first Member of Parliament for the territory since 1904. A by-election was not called to fill his seat.
