= 2nd Council of the Northwest Territories =

Governing body of Northwest Territories, Canada (1905–1951)

Council of the Northwest Territories

Type
- Type: Unicameral

History
- Established: 1905
- Disbanded: 1951
- Preceded by: 5th North-West Legislative Assembly
- Succeeded by: 1st Northwest Territories Legislative Council
- Seats: 5 at dissolution

Elections
- Last election: Appointments from 1921 to 1951

Meeting place
- Various communities and Ottawa

The 2nd Council of the Northwest Territories, known formally as the Council of the Northwest Territories, was the governing body of Canada's Northwest Territories from 1905 to 1951. In 1905 when Alberta and Saskatchewan were carved out the Northwest Territories, there were too few enfranchised voters in the remaining area of the Territories to justify responsible government. The Northwest Territories reverted to 1870 constitutional status. Political parties and the position of Lieutenant Governor was abolished. The government came under the direct control of Ottawa.

== Council history ==
In 1905 Frederick D. White was appointed the first commissioner of the Northwest Territories by Sir Wilfrid Laurier to oversee a four-man appointed council. No council was appointed until 1921, but provisions existed in law for four council seats. The Northwest Territories was instead run by the Department of Mines and Resources Canada and no legislation under territorial jurisdiction was passed or updated in this period.

In 1921 a deputy commissioner position was created and the first session of the council was convened in Ottawa. The first act of the council was to increase the number of members to six. The deputy commissioner position and a seat on the council were automatically given to the Director of Mines and Resources. All legislation during this council was created with the advice and guidance of the director. In essence the director was a de facto government leader, and held more power than the commissioner.

In 1939 a special administration district was created. This was a hybrid between an electoral district and a Senate division. It was not until 1947 when John G. McNiven would be appointed to represent the district. He would also be the first person living in the Northwest Territories since 1905 and the first person from the Arctic to sit on the council.

All other members of the council were from outside of the territories, and usually civil servants residing in Ottawa. This period of Northwest Territories history is generally regarded by the people of the Northwest Territories as a time of great neglect. The council during this period never had any sessions in the Territories, but members did travel occasionally to consult with municipal governments.

== Commissioners during the 2nd Council ==
Member	Year appointed	Year served
Frederick D. White	1905	1919
William Wallace Cory	1919	1931
Hugh H. Rowatt	1931	1934
Charles Camsell	1936	1946
Hugh Keenleyside	1947	1950
Hugh Andrew Young^{1}	1950	1951

Note: ^{1}Hugh Young continued to serve as commissioner after the sixth general election.

== Deputy commissioners during the 2nd Council ==
Member	Year appointed	Year served
Roy Gibson	April 20, 1921	1950
Frank Cunningham^{1}	1951	1951

Note: ^{1}Frank Cunningham continued to serve as deputy commissioner after the sixth general election.

Deputy Commissioners also counted as regular members of the Northwest Territories council.

== Members of the 2nd Council ==
Member	Appointed	Left office	No. of terms	Notes
John Wesley Greenway	April 20, 1921	April 24, 1928	1st term	Died in office
Aylesworth Perry	April 20, 1921	April 1, 1922	1st term	
Duncan Campbell Scott	1929		1st term	Appointed to replace John Greenway
Charles Camsell			1st term	
Hugh Howard Rowatt			1st term	
Oswald Sterling Finnie			1st term	
Austin Cumming	1940?	1947	1st term	At large
Kenneth Daly	1940?	1947	1st term	At large
Harold McGill	1940	1947	1st term	At large
Stuart Wood	April 1938	1951	1st term	At large
Oscar D. Skelton	April 8, 1938	January 28, 1941	1st term	At large
Hugh Keenleyside	1941	1947	1st term	At large
Robert Hoey	1946	1947	1st term	At large
John G. McNiven	1947	1951	1st term	Appointed to represent Yellowknife
Harold Godwin	1947	1951	1st term	At large
Louis Audette	1947	1951	1st term	At large

Note:

- Members during this period were appointed until the dissolution of the council in 1951, and vacancy only occurred on resignation or death.
