= 6th Northwest Territories Legislative Council =

6th Legislative Council

Type
- Type: Unicameral

History
- Established: 1967
- Disbanded: 1970
- Preceded by: 5th Northwest Territories Legislative Council
- Succeeded by: 7th Northwest Territories Legislative Council
- Seats: 12

Elections
- Last election: 1967

Meeting place
- Yellowknife

The 6th Northwest Territories Legislative Council was the 13th assembly of the territorial government. It took place from 1967 and was dissolved in 1970. This was the first council that took place specifically in the capital city of Yellowknife.

This session was the first time an Inuk (Simonie Michael) was elected to the council, though Abe Okpik had been appointed the previous session. It also marks the first participation by a First Nations member of the council (John Tetlichi, appointed).

== Appointed members ==
Date	Name
November 9, 1967	Lloyd Barber

== Membership ==
District / position	Member	First Appointed / First elected /previously elected	No. of terms
Appointed Member	Lloyd Barber	1967	1st term
Appointed Member	Hugh Campbell	1964	2nd term
Appointed Member	James Gordon Gibson	1967	1st term
Appointed Member	John Havelock Parker	1967	1st term
Appointed Member	John Tetlichi	1967	1st term
Central Arctic	Robert Williamson	1966	2nd term
Eastern Arctic	Simonie Michael	1966	2nd term
Mackenzie Delta	Lyle Trimble	1964	2nd term
Mackenzie North	David Searle	1967	1st term
Mackenzie River	Bill Berg	1967	1st term
Mackenzie River	Mark Duane Fairbrother (1968)	1968	1st term
Mackenzie South	Donald Morton Stewart	1967	1st term
Western Arctic	Duncan Pryde	1967	1st term
