= 1964 Northwest Territories general election =

Canadian election

The 1964 Northwest Territories general election took place on March 31, 1964.

== Appointed members ==
5th Northwest Territories Legislative Council
Member	New/Re-appointed
Stuart Hodgson	New
Wilfred Brown	Re-appointed
Frank Vallee	New
Hugh Campbell	New
Robert Harvey	New

== Elected members ==
For complete electoral history, see individual districts

5th Northwest Territories Legislative Council
District	Member
Mackenzie Delta	Lyle Trimble
Mackenzie North	Peter Baker
Mackenzie River	John Goodall
Mackenzie South	Robert Porritt
