= 1967 Northwest Territories general election =

The 1967 Northwest Territories general election took place on July 4, 1967.

Tragedy would ensue after this election as member-elect Bill Berg died in a plane crash while flying into Yellowknife on October 1, only a few days before the new council was to open.

This would be the first time since 1905 where more elected members would sit than appointed members.

This is also the first election in the history of the territories that electoral districts covered the entire territories. The redistribution of districts was a result of the Carrothers Commission. It would also be the last general election that had members appointed to the Northwest Territories council.

== Election summary ==
Election summary	# of candidates		Popular vote	
Election summary	Incumbent	New	#	%
Elected candidates	1	5	?	?
Acclaimed candidates	0	1		
Appointed Members	2	3		
Defeated candidates				
Total			6,463	100%
Turnout 64.6%

== Members elected ==
For complete electoral history, see individual districts

6th Northwest Territories Legislative Council
District	Member
Central Arctic	Robert Williamson
Eastern Arctic	Simonie Michael
Mackenzie Delta	Lyle Trimble
Mackenzie North	David Searle
Mackenzie River	Bill Berg
Mackenzie South	Donald Morton Stewart
Western Arctic	Duncan Pryde

== Appointed members ==
Council members appointed on November 9, 1967
Member	New / Re-appointed
Lloyd Barber	New
Hugh Campbell	Re-appointed
John Tetlichi	New
James Gordon Gibson	New
John Havelock Parker	Incumbent Deputy Commissioner

The final phase of the general election was the appointments of four council seats after the writs from the general election had returned. A fifth appointed seat also existed automatically going to the incumbent Deputy Commissioner who was reserved a seat on council.

Only one incumbent was appointed from the previous council that was retired Air Marshal Hugh Campbell. Abraham Okpik the first Inuk member of the council was dropped due to the election of Simonie Michael. The federal government felt that Okpik who had been appointed to represent Inuit in the eastern arctic was better served by Michael, the first elected Inuk. He was replaced on council by Chief John Tetlichi from Fort McPherson who was the first status Indian ever appointed to council.

The other two appointments went to James Gordon Gibson and Lloyd Barber. Gibson was living in Vancouver at the time having moved from the Yukon where he grew up. He had served in the logging industry on the west coast at the time of this appointment. The final appointee was Lloyd Barber a Dean of Commerce at the University of Saskatchewan. He had served on the Royal Commission on Government Administration in 1965.

The appointments were announced on November 9, 1967 by Minister of Indian Affairs and Northern Development Arthur Laing. He also announced that this would likely be the last appointments to the council as the government was considering plans to reform the council into a fully elected body. The federal government kept the appointments for another term until 1975.
