= 1951 Northwest Territories general election =

The 1951 Northwest Territories general election was held on September 17, 1951, in the Northwest Territories, Canada. It was the territory's first general election since 1902. The election came about after The Northwest Territories Act was amended to permit three elected members from the Mackenzie District to join the five appointed members on the Executive Council of the Northwest Territories. The Council, which had met in Ottawa, Ontario, outside of the Northwest Territories, shortly after the election, the council began to alternate sittings between Ottawa and Northwest Territories communities.

== Background ==
The bill to re-initiate territorial elections in the Northwest Territories was introduced in the Canadian House of Commons by Federal Resources Minister Robert Henry Winters.

== Aboriginal vote ==
The 1951 election was the first in the territory to allow aboriginal peoples to vote and stand for election. However the electoral districts created for the election included only the west portion of the territories thus disenfranchising the prominently aboriginal eastern portion of the territory. When the nominations closed on August 20, 1951, no aboriginals stood for office.

== Female suffrage ==
Unlike the small elections in the Territories prior to the first general election in 1888, this was considered a general election, since it was based on the dissolution of the previous legislature. It was the smallest general election in Northwest Territories history.

This was the first election in the Northwest Territories in which women had the right to vote. Female suffrage was permitted under the Northwest Territories Elections Ordinance of 1951, this was the last jurisdiction in Canada to grant voting rights to women. The first woman candidate in the territory's history also ran in this election: Vivian Roberts from Aklavik.

The writ for the election was dropped on July 3, 1951, and the nominations closed on August 20, 1951.

== Election summary ==
Election summary	# of candidates	Popular vote	
Election summary	# of candidates	#	%
Elected candidates	3	1,471	53.39%
Defeated candidates	8	1,233	44.76%
Rejected ballots	51		1.85%
Total	11	2,755	100%

== Appointed members ==
1st Northwest Territories Legislative Council
Member	New/Re-appointed
Louis Audette	Re-appointed
William Clements	New
Donald McKay	?
Leonard Nicholson	New
Frank Cunningham^{1}	Re-appointed

Note:

^{1} Frank Cunningham was also Deputy Commissioner

== Elected members ==
For complete electoral history, see individual districts

1st Northwest Territories Legislative Council
District	Member
Mackenzie South	James Brodie
Mackenzie West	Frank Carmichael
Mackenzie North	Merv Hardie

== See also ==
- List of Northwest Territories general elections
- 2nd Council of the Northwest Territories
