= Deputy Commissioner of Northwest Territories =

Role in the Canadian government

The Deputy Commissioner of the Northwest Territories, Canada is second to the Commissioner in the hierarchy of Northwest Territories government. The Deputy Commissioner assumes the responsibilities of the Commissioner in the event of the Commissioner's absence, illness, or other incapacity, or when the office is vacant. The position was created in 1921, and the Deputy Commissioner held a seat in the Legislative Assembly of the Northwest Territories.

In modern times the Deputy Commissioner is largely ceremonial. The Deputy Commissioner fills in where the Commissioner can not attend events. Of the thirteen Deputy Commissioners, five have gone on to serve as Commissioner (Hodgson, Parker, Maksagak, Marion and Whitford), two have served as Commissioners of Nunavut (Maksagak and Hanson) and one as Deputy Commissioner of Nunavut (Maksagak).

The Deputy Commissioner is appointed by the Privy Council of Canada.

== See also ==
- List of Northwest Territories deputy commissioners
