= Frank Cunningham (politician) =

Canadian politician (died 1964)

Deputy Commissioner of Northwest Territories
- In office 26 June 1951 – 10 April 1957
- Preceded by: Roy A. Gibson
- Succeeded by: Wilfred G. Brown

Speaker of the Legislative Assembly of the Northwest Territories
- In office 26 June 1951 – 10 April 1957
- Preceded by: Roy A. Gibson
- Succeeded by: Wilfred G. Brown

Personal details
- Died: 1964
- Profession: Civil servant, lawyer, magistrate

Frank Cunningham was a Canadian lawyer and public servant.

The Canadian Labor Defence League sent Cunningham along with Soloman Greenberg and W. H. Heffarnan to hear the cases of miners who had been arrested during the Saskatchewan Miner's struggle of 1931. Cunningham headed the inquiry in the "On-to-Ottawa" march in 1935 and after the end of Second World War he headed the trials related to war crimes in Singapore. He joined the public service in 1946.

In 1950 he was appointed the deputy commissioner of Northwest territories and was posted to Ottawa from Yellowknife. He succeeded Roy A. Gibson who had occupied the post for 40 years. He was the deputy commissioner of the Northwest Territories during 2nd Council of the Northwest Territories and was the appointed member of 1st Northwest Territories Legislative Council. After the 1954 Northwest Territories general election he was re-appointed the member of legislative council. Prior to joining public services he served in Northwest Territories Council as a lawyer.

He was the Speaker of the Legislative Assembly of the Northwest Territories and the Deputy Commissioner of the Northwest Territories from 26 June 1951 to 10 April 1957. He was also the director of Northern Administration and Lands Branch of the Department of Northern Affairs and the director of Arctic affairs in 1956.

Cunningham lived in Ottawa. He retired from public service on 8 November 1963 and died in 1964. Robert Gordon Robertson mentioned in his book Memoirs of a Very Civil Servant: Mackenzie King to Pierre Trudeau that though he was not imaginative, he had an encyclopedic knowledge of administrative details.

== Bibliography ==
- Robertson, Robert Gordon (2000). Memoirs of a Very Civil Servant: Mackenzie King to Pierre Trudeau. University of Toronto Press. ISBN 978-0-8020-4445-7.
- Wade, Frank (2005). Advocate for the North. Trafford Publishing. ISBN 978-1-4122-2978-4.
