= Parker's Notch =

Land boundary feature in Canada

Coordinates: 69°54′14″N 112°38′24″W

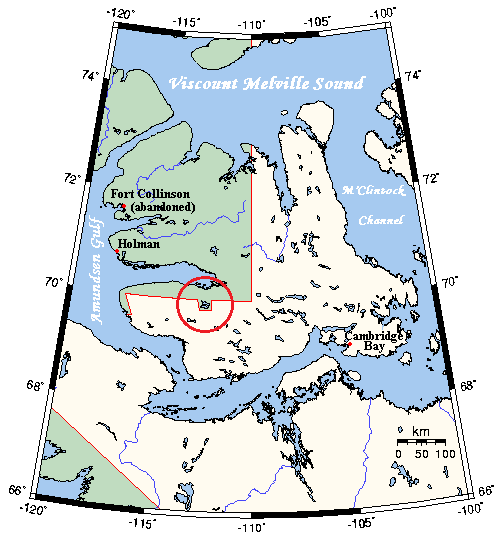
Victoria Island, with Parker's Notch circled in red.

Parker's Notch, named after former Commissioner of the Northwest Territories, John Havelock Parker, is a protrusion of the Northwest Territories southwards into Nunavut on Victoria Island. In the Northwest Territories the protrusion is part of the Inuvik Region and the Kitikmeot Region in Nunavut.

== Description ==
Parker's Notch is located on the Wollaston Peninsula in southwestern Victoria Island. The notch protrudes south from the 70th parallel north and encompasses most of Quunnguq Lake.

== Formation ==
Parker's Notch was formed as a result of the Inuvialuit Final Agreement (IFA). The agreement, signed on June 5, 1984 after 10 years of negotiations, created the Inuvialuit Settlement Region. In the agreement, the Inuvialuit were given legal control over 91,000 km^{2} (35,000 sq mi) of land, including subsurface rights to 13,000 km^{2} (5,000 sq mi) of oil, gas and minerals. In addition, the Inuvialuit were given the right to hunt and harvest anywhere in the claimed area. They also became responsible for wildlife management, becoming part of a wildlife management team with the government. In exchange, the Inuvialuit gave up their exclusive use of their lands.

The agreement also set the border between the Inuvialuit region and the Northwest Territories. The border agreement included a notch of land on the east–west line on Victoria Island that would encompass Quunnguq Lake. Quunnguq Lake was a traditional hunting and fishing location for the Inuvialuit, and was included in the IFA to protect access to the lake to them. The notch was later reaffirmed in the 1993 Nunavut Act.

== See also ==
- History of Nunavut
- History of the Northwest Territories
