= Jock McNiven =

Canadian politician

His Worship Jock McNiven

1st Mayor of Yellowknife
- In office January 1, 1954 – October 31, 1954
- Preceded by: office established
- Succeeded by: Gordon A. Allen

Personal details
- Born: John Graham McNiven; April 2, 1900
- Died: September 27, 1969 (aged 69)

John Graham McNiven (April 2, 1900 – September 27, 1969) was a mine engineer, mine operator and politician from the Northwest Territories, Canada.

McNiven was a 1923 graduate of the University of Toronto (M.Sc. in Mining Engineering) and worked for several years in mining camps in Ontario. He first came to Yellowknife, Northwest Territories in 1938 to work as mill superintendent of Negus Mines Ltd. His family joined him in 1940. Upon the resignation of mine manager Bill Stuart, McNiven was promoted to this position in May 1939 where he remained until the mine closed in 1952. In 1946 he established a chapter of the Grand Lodge of Alberta (Freemason), the first lodge in the Northwest Territories.

McNiven was the first northern resident to become a member of the Legislative Assembly of Northwest Territories; in 1947 he was appointed to the council, for Yellowknife. At that time he was the only member living in the territory to serve. He would serve on the council until it was dissolved for the 1951 general election.

In the November 1953 municipal election, in which McNiven ran un-opposed, he became the first mayor of Yellowknife. The position was effective January 1, 1954 for two years; however, McNiven did not complete his term, resigning in October 1954 to focus on his mine engineering business. In 1955, he took the position of mine manager at the Port Radium or Eldorado uranium mine on Great Bear Lake where he guided the mine to a close in September 1960. McNiven retired from Eldorado Nuclear Limited in 1965, and died at his Salt Springs, British Columbia home in September 1969.

A number of local points in Yellowknife are named after him, including Niven Lake, McNiven Beach and Niven Drive. A tug owned by the Northern Transportation Company Limited, based in the town of Hay River, was also named after him - M/V Jock McNiven.
