= William MacBrien =

William MacBrien may refer to:

- W. A. H. MacBrien, Canadian hockey executive
- William Ross MacBrien (1913–1986), Canadian air marshal

== See also ==
- William C. McBrien (1889–1954), Canadian businessman
