= Order of the Northwest Territories =

Civilian honour for merit in Canada

- Insignia of the Northwest Territories

Awarded by the commissioner of the Northwest Territories
- Type: Order of merit (territorial)
- Eligibility: All current and former residents of the territory who are not elected representatives in government
- Awarded for: Those who have served with the greatest distinction and excelled in any field of endeavour benefiting the people of the Northwest Territories or elsewhere.
- Status: Currently constituted
- Chancellor: Gerald Kisoun
- Grades: Member
- Post-nominals: ONWT

Statistics
- First induction: October 7, 2015
- Total inductees: 30

Precedence
- Next (higher): Order of Nunavut
- Next (lower): Order of Yukon
- Ribbon bar of the order

The Order of the Northwest Territories (Note: French: Ordre des Territoires du Nord-Ouest) is a civilian honour for merit in the Canadian territory of the Northwest Territories. Instituted in 2013, it is the highest honour which can be bestowed by the Government of the Northwest Territories. It is intended to honour current and former residents of the territory who have served with great distinction and excelled in any field of endeavour to benefit the people of the Northwest Territories and others. The commissioner of the Northwest Territories is an ex officio member of the Order, and serves as its chancellor.

== Recipients ==
First awarded in 2015, it may be awarded to up to 10 people in the first two years. In subsequent years it may be awarded to no more than three persons annually.

Chancellors/Commissioners

- George Tuccaro (2015)
- Margaret Thom (2017)
- Gerald Kisoun (2024)

2015

- Bruce Green
- Lucy Jackson
- Sonny MacDonald
- Gino Pin
- Ruth Spence
- John B. Zoè

2016

- Nellie Cournoyea
- Jan Stirling
- Tony Whitford
- Marie Wilson

2017

- Paul Andrew
- Fred Carmichael
- Russell King
- Linda Koe
- Jeff Philipp
- Tom Zubko

2018

- Les Carpenter
- Sharon Firth
- Lillian Elias

2019

- Lyda Fuller
- "Buffalo" Joe McBryan

2021

- JoAnne Deneron
- Paul Kaeser II
- Mary Effie Snowshoe

2022

- Jane Dragon
- Richard Van Camp
- Suzette Montreuil

2023

- Helen Balanoff
- Rick Hardy
- Maya Teya

2024

- Tammy Roberts
- David Hurley

== See also ==
- Symbols of the Northwest Territories
- Orders, decorations, and medals of the Canadian provinces
- Canadian honours order of wearing
