= Louis Arthur Audette =

Canadian lawyer and judge

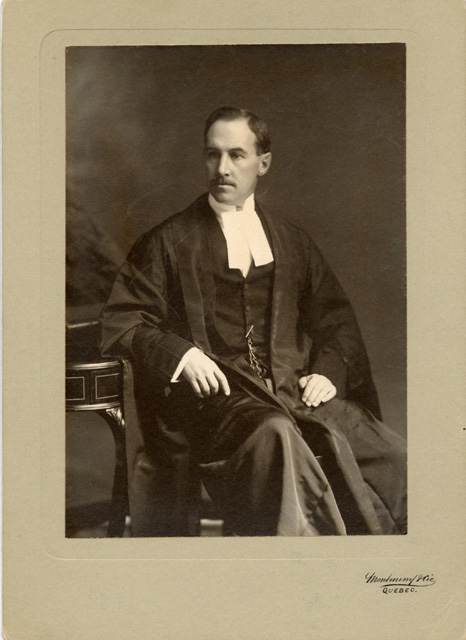

Louis Arthur Audette (1 December 1856 – 20 January 1942) was a Canadian lawyer and judge of the Exchequer Court of Canada.

== Biography ==
Born in Quebec City, Audette was educated at Quebec Seminary and Laval University. He was called to the Quebec Bar in 1880 and appointed King's Counsel in 1908.

Audette was the Registrar of the Exchequer Court of Canada from 1887, when it was detached from the Supreme Court of Canada, until 1912, when he was appointed Assistant Judge of the Exchequer Court, becoming a Puisne Judge in 1920. From 1913 to 1916, he chaired a commission of inquiry on pelagic sealing.

Audette retired in December 1931, upon reaching the mandatory retirement age of seventy-five, and was replaced by Eugène-Réal Angers. He died in Ottawa in 1942, aged eighty-five.

His son Louis de la Chesnaye Audette was a lawyer, naval officer, and civil servant.
