= Clarence Dunlap =

Canadian Air Force officer (1908–2003)

Clarence Rupert Dunlap
- Born: 1 January 1908; Sydney Mines, Nova Scotia, Canada
- Died: 20 October 2003 (aged 95)
- Military career
- Allegiance: Canada
- Branch: Royal Canadian Air Force
- Service years: 1928–1968
- Rank: Air Marshal
- Commands: No.6 Bombing and Gunnery School; RAF Leeming; No.331 (Bomber) Wing; No.139 (Bomber) Wing; No.64 (Bomber) Base; Northwest Air Command; Air Defence Command; National Defence College; Chief of the Air Staff
- Conflicts: World War II
- Awards: Commander of the Order of the British Empire; Canadian Forces' Decoration; Silver Star (USA); Croix de Guerre with gold star (France)

Air Marshal Clarence Rupert Dunlap CBE, CD (1 January 1908 – 20 October 2003) was a Canadian airman who, from 1962 to 1964, served as the last Chief of the Air Staff of the Royal Canadian Air Force before it was subsumed into the newly unified Canadian Forces. From 1964 to 1967 he was the deputy commander-in-chief of NORAD. In his later years, Dunlap was the last surviving Royal Canadian Air Force air marshal.

== Early career ==
Dunlap joined the Royal Canadian Air Force in 1928, earning his pilot's wings at Camp Borden in Ontario.

In his early flying career Dunlap was assigned to aerial photography duties when he mapped out large parts of Canada. Later, in the mid-1930s, he worked in air armament.

== World War II ==
On the outbreak of World War II, Dunlap was the Director of Armament at Air Force Headquarters. In 1942 he was promoted to group captain and took up command of the air armament school at RCAF Station Mountain View in Ontario.

Dunlap was posted to the United Kingdom in late 1942, becoming Station Commander of RAF Leeming in Yorkshire in January 1943. At that time Leeming was part of No. 6 Group in Bomber Command. Dunlap's time at Leeming only lasted until April 1943 and he was then given command of No. 331 (Bomber) Wing which comprised Nos. 420, 424, and 425 Squadrons operating the Wellington bomber in Tunisia and were used to support the invasion of Sicily and then Italy. Later he was promoted to air commodore and in January 1945 he was appointed Air Officer Commanding No. 64 Base headquartered at RAF Middleton St. George.

== Postwar ==
After the war, Dunlap was Commandant of the National Defence College (1951–1954). Promoted to air vice-marshal in 1954, he served as Vice-Chief of the Air Staff in 1954. Returning to Europe in 1958, Dunlap was appointed Deputy Chief of Staff (Operations) at Supreme Headquarters Allied Powers Europe (SHAPE). There he wrote and article for the European-Atlantic Review about the role of Europe's radar shield.

Dunlap was promoted to air marshal and served as Chief of the Air Staff in 1962. His final service appointment was as the Deputy Commander of the North American Aerospace Defense Command (or NORAD) from 1964 to 1967. He retired from RCAF in 1968.

In retirement Dunlap worked on a voluntary basis to support the development of the National Aviation Museum in Ottawa. In 1979 Dunlap moved to Victoria in British Columbia where he retired from voluntary work. At his death in 2003, Dunlap was the last of the RCAF air marshals.

Military offices
Preceded by S Graham	Station Commander RAF Leeming; 1943	Succeeded by H M Carscallan
Preceded by R E McBurney	Air Officer Commanding No. 64 Base; 1945	Succeeded by H B Godwin
Preceded by F R Miller	Vice-Chief of the Air Staff; 1954 – 1958	Unknown
Preceded by H L Campbell	Chief of the Air Staff (RCAF); 1962 – 1964	Vacant No single national air power organization Title next held by W K Carr (As Commander, Air Command in 1975)
Preceded by C R Slemon	Deputy Commander of NORAD; 1964 – 1967	Succeeded by W R MacBrien
