= Polar Medal (Canada) =

- Obverse and reverse of the medal
- Type: Medal (national)
- Awarded for: Outstanding service in support of scientific research, polar exploration, preserving northern culture or securing Canada's northern sovereignty
- Presented by: The monarch of Canada
- Status: Currently awarded
- Established: Governor General's Northern Medal: September 15, 2005; Polar Medal: June 23, 2015
- First award: Governor General's Northern Medal: 2005; Polar Medal: July 8, 2015

Highlights
- Total: Governor General's Northern Medal: 9 Polar Medal: 32 (as of 2019)
- Website: Official website
- Ribbon bar of the medal

Precedence
- Next (higher): European Security and Defence Policy Service Medal
- Next (lower): Sovereign's Medal for Volunteers

The Polar Medal (French: Médaille polaire) is a Canadian medal intended to honour explorers of Canada's polar regions and defenders of the country's sovereignty in the north. The medal was initially conceived by Governor General Adrienne Clarkson as the Governor General's Northern Medal and created on September 15, 2005, to award those who served with distinction in northern Canada. It was replaced by the Polar Medal on June 23, 2015.

== History ==
Until 1967, Canadians were eligible for the United Kingdom's Polar Medal (known as the Arctic Medal until 1904), since Canada had not yet promulgated its own system of honours and employed that of the United Kingdom. On September 15, 2005, Governor General Adrienne Clarkson created the Governor General's Northern Medal. That medal was incorporated into and replaced by the new Canadian Polar Medal on June 23, 2015, the 145th anniversary of the transfer to Canada of Rupert's Land and the North-Western Territory (today the Northwest Territories). The first medals were presented at a ceremony in the Yukon Territory on July 8, 2015.

== Design ==
The Governor General's Northern Medal was designed by Cathy Bursey-Sabourin. It was set in a crystal base and depicted on its obverse a snowy owl (guardian spirit), the aurora borealis (scope of the North), and a Canadian Arctic diamond (the North Star). On the reverse are the words Governor General’s Northern Medal/La Médaille du Gouverneur général pour la nordicité along with the recipient's name.

The Canadian Heraldic Authority designed the Polar Medal based on a concept by Major Carl Gauthier of the Directorate of Honours and Recognition section of the Department of National Defence. It is a silver, 36 mm diameter, octagonal disk that bears on its obverse an effigy of Canada's monarch, Queen Elizabeth II (symbolising the sovereign as fount of honour), wearing a diadem with maple leaves and snowflakes and surrounded by the words ELIZABETH II DEI GRATIA REGINA, separated by two maple leaves from the word CANADA at the bottom. The edge of the obverse is decorated with small denticles. On the reverse is an image of the Royal Canadian Mounted Police schooner St. Roch (which patrolled the Arctic in the early to mid-20th century) adjacent to a tall iceberg, two crew standing on the ice. (Crew members of the St. Roch received the British Polar Medal.)

The medal is worn on the left chest suspended from a 32 mm wide white ribbon, which is affixed to a suspension bar showing a representation of the North Star with curved limbs on each side, intended to evoke the aurora borealis, winds, and water currents; should an individual already possessing the Polar Medal be awarded the medal again, they are granted a silver medal bar with raised edges, bearing a maple leaf at its centre, for wear on the ribbon from which the original medal is suspended. The medal will be cast by the Royal Canadian Mint.

== Eligibility ==
The Governor General's Northern Medal was awarded to "citizens whose actions and achievements contributed to the evolution and constant reaffirmation of the Canadian North as part of our national identity."

The Polar Medal was created with the approval of Queen Elizabeth II to "recognize those who have contributed to or endeavoured to promote a greater understanding of Canada’s Northern communities and its people", as well as "those individuals who have withstood the rigours of the polar climate to make significant contributions to polar exploration and knowledge, scientific research, and the securement of Canada's Northern sovereignty." Nominations may be made by any person or group at any time. A committee in the Chancellery of Honours at Rideau Hall reviews the nominations and makes recommendations to the governor general. Unlike the Governor General's Northern Medal, the Polar Medal is a part of the Canadian honours system.

Contributions for which a Canadian honour has been awarded are not eligible. Examples include the Alert Clasp for 180 days service at CFS Alert and the Ranger Clasp for four years honourable service with the Canadian Rangers.

Administration of the selection process was indefinitely paused at the beginning of the COVID-19 pandemic, and no new awards have been made since 2019.

== Recipients ==
Governor General's Northern Medal

- Bertha Allen
- Nellie Cournoyea
- Tagak Curley
- Georges Erasmus
- Louis Fortier
- Jill Heinerth
- Stephen Kakfwi
- Zacharias Kunuk
- Mary Simon
- Sheila Watt-Cloutier

Polar Medal

- Christopher Burn
- Gerald Kisoun

== See also ==
- Governor General's Awards
- Arctic Inspiration Prize
