= Wilfred Curtis =

Air Marshal Wilfred Curtis OC CB CBE DSC* ED CD
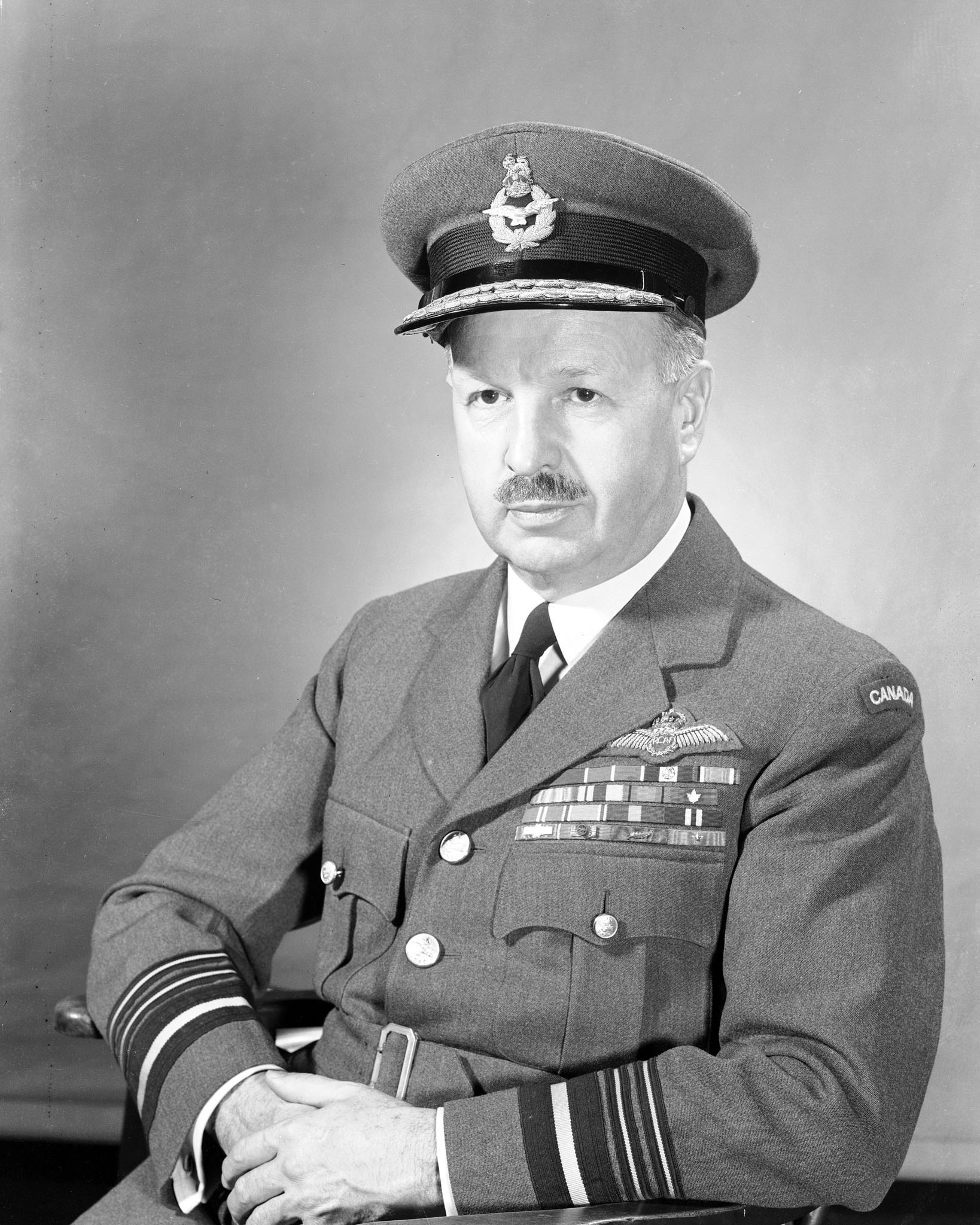
- Born: 21 August 1893; Havelock, Ontario, Canada
- Died: 14 August 1977 (aged 83); Toronto, Ontario, Canada
- Military career
- Allegiance: Canada
- Branch: Canadian Expeditionary Force; Royal Naval Air Service; Royal Air Force; Royal Canadian Air Force
- Service years: 1916–1919; 1933–1953
- Rank: Air Marshal
- Nickname: Wilf
- Conflicts: World War I World War II
- Awards: Officer of the Order of Canada; Companion of the Order of the Bath; Commander of the Order of the British Empire; Distinguished Service Cross & Bar; Efficiency Decoration; Canadian Forces' Decoration

Wilfred Austin Curtis (21 August 1893 – 14 August 1977) was a Canadian airman and Chief of the Air Staff of the Royal Canadian Air Force (RCAF) from 1947 until 1953.

== Early years ==
He was born in Havelock, Ontario, having received his early education in Toronto.

== First World War ==
He then joined the infantry of the Canadian Expeditionary Force in 1915; he graduated on 11 August 1916 and joining the Royal Naval Air Service (RNAS) as a fighter pilot.

In 1917 Curtis was promoted to captain and awarded the Distinguished Service Cross (United Kingdom) (DSC) for his skill and courage. The award citation read:

Flt. Sub-Lieut. (act. Flt. Lieut.) Wilfred Austin Curtis, R.N.A.S. For conspicuous gallantry and devotion to duty. He has on many occasions destroyed and driven out of control enemy machines. On 21 October 1917, in a combined attack with two other pilots, he sent down an enemy machine in flames, and twenty minutes later he followed another enemy scout from 10,000 to 2,000 feet, and sent it down in a vertical dive, which ended in a crash.

In 1918, Curtis was awarded a Bar to the DSC.

He proved his worth as a highly successful fighter pilot by shooting down 13 enemy aircraft confirmed; his final tally was 4 enemy planes destroyed, 3 of which were shared victories; also, he drove down 9 enemy planes out of control, one of which was shared.

He transferred to the Royal Air Force (RAF) in April 1918.

== Interwar years ==
On his return to Canada he maintained his interest in military as well as civil aviation. During the late 1920s and early 1930s, he served as an officer in the Toronto Scottish Regiment Reserve. For some time there were no available non-permanent military aviation positions. However, when the opportunity presented itself in 1933, he became involved in the formation of No. 10 (Army Co-operation) Squadron. Curtis became Officer Commanding in 1935 and initiated experimental air operations in mid-northern Ontario.

== Second World War ==
Wing Commander Curtis was called to active duty in the RCAF on 1 September 1939 and became deputy air officer commanding, RCAF Overseas Headquarters in London in 1941. He became a member of the Air Council in 1944.

== Post-war years ==
The singular success that marks his air force career in wartime decisions was rewarded by his appointment in 1947 as Chief of the Air Staff. In this appointment he guided the RCAF through the difficult stages of reorganization which followed the war and through the expansion of Canada's participation in the Korean War and the North Atlantic Treaty Organization (NATO). He received French, American and Italian decorations in recognition of his contributions. He remained Chief of the Air Staff until his retirement in January 1953.

On his retirement from the RCAF he accepted the position of Vice-Chairman of Hawker Siddeley Canada, where he continued to have a substantial impact on the development of aviation in Canada. He always devoted time to other aviation concerns: was President of the RCAF Association for two years until he was appointed Grand President of that organization, founded and organized the Canadian National Air Show in 1939 and served as chairman of its scholarship fund and was appointed the Honorary Wing Commander of the No. 400 (City of Toronto) Squadron.

Other interests included the chairmanship of the committee that formed York University, of which he was elected Chancellor in 1960. He served as Chairman of the Canadian Opera Company and President of the Canadian Inter American Association.

The Air Marshal had a great interest in the development of the Canadian aircraft industry. During his term of office, he continually and successfully directed his efforts to secure money for experimental work on and production of a jet trainer and twin engine fighters, the CF-100 Canuck and the CF-105 Arrow suitable for interception operations in the northern Canadian climate. Early in the Cold War, he convinced the cabinet that the RCAF should make a major contribution to NATO. This resulted in an air division of twelve F-86 Sabre squadrons being dispatched to Europe. This major contribution of 300 front line aircraft was the principal air defense force on that continent during the 1950s.

== Awards and decorations ==
- Companion, Order of the Bath (C.B.) (1946)
- Commander, Order of the British Empire (C.B.E.) (1943)
- Distinguished Service Cross with bar (1917 & 1918)
- Efficiency Decoration (1945)
- Canadian Forces' Decoration (C.D.)
- Order of Canada (O.C.) (1967)
- Canada's Aviation Hall of Fame (1973)
- Honorary Doctor of Laws from York University (LL.D.) (1968)

Military offices
Preceded by R Leckie	Chief of the Air Staff (RCAF); 1947 – 1953	Succeeded by C R Slemon
Academic offices
New title University established	Chancellor of York University; 1959 – 1968	Succeeded by Floyd Chalmers
