= Cathy Bursey-Sabourin =

Canadian designer and heraldic artist

Cathy Lynne Bursey-Sabourin MVO FRHSC (born 1957) is a Canadian designer and heraldic artist.

She launched her career as a commercial and graphic designer in St. John's and Ottawa. Her involvement with heraldic art began at the Department of National Defence. In 1989, she was appointed as Fraser Herald at the Canadian Heraldic Authority in Ottawa. She is the principal artist of the Authority and the first woman to hold a state herald appointment in the Commonwealth. Cathy Bursey-Sabourin has been responsible for the paintings made for the arms of the last five Governors General of Canada and the Coat of arms of Canada.

She designed Ottawa's emblem for the 22nd International Congress of Genealogical and Heraldic Sciences held in 1996, which used a main maple leaf design with two smaller leaves representing the genealogy and heraldry that the event was centered around. She also provided detailed artwork for the new insignia of the Victoria Cross.

In 2005, Bursey-Sabourin designed the Governor General's Northern Medal. From the fall of 2010, she worked with a team of designers that created the Canadian Queen Elizabeth II Platinum Jubilee Emblem. In 2023, she designed the Canadian Coronation Emblem for the coronation of Charles III and Camilla.

Bursey-Sabourin was appointed a Member of the Royal Victorian Order (MVO) in the 2023 New Year Honours.

== See also ==
- Herald
- Royal Heraldry Society of Canada

Heraldic offices
Preceded by position created	Fraser Herald; 1989–present	Incumbent
