= Frank Carmichael =

Canadian politician

Frank Carmichael (born c. 1887) was a trapper and a territorial level politician in the Northwest Territories, Canada.

== Early life ==
Carmichael moved to Aklavik, Northwest Territories in 1927 and began working as a trapper.

== Political career ==
Carmichael began his political career when he ran for a seat on the Northwest Territories Council in the 1951 Northwest Territories general election becoming one of the three elected members of the 1st Northwest Territories Legislative Council. He won the new electoral district of Mackenzie West defeating Vivian Roberts, the first woman candidate in Northwest Territories history, and Karl Helmer Walter Gardlund by a wide margin in a high-profile race. His electoral district was abolished due to redistribution in 1954 and he ran in and won the new Mackenzie Delta in the 1954 Northwest Territories general election. He served out his second term and did not return when the Legislature was dissolved in 1957.

== Electoral results ==
1951 Northwest Territories general election: Mackenzie West
Candidate	Votes	%
Frank Carmichael	407	58.14%
Vivian Roberts	190	27.14%
Karl Helmer Walter Gardlund	103	14.72%
Total valid ballots / Turnout	700	42.35%
Rejected ballots	11	
Source(s) Cloutier, Edmomd (1952). Report of the Chief Electoral Officer. Queen's Printer.

1954 Northwest Territories general election: Mackenzie Delta
Candidate	Votes	%
Frank Carmichael	353	54.31%
James Edward Sittichinli	297	45.69%
Total valid ballots / Turnout	650	66.54%
Rejected ballots	28	
Source(s) Cloutier, Edmomd (1955). Report of the Chief Electoral Officer. Queen's Printer.

Legislative Assembly of the Northwest Territories
New district	Member of the Legislative Assembly for Mackenzie West; 1951–1954	District Abolished
New district	Member of the Legislative Assembly for Mackenzie Delta; 1954–1957	Succeeded by Knut Lang
