= 6th Canadian Infantry Brigade =

Brigade of the Canadian Army

- Active: 1915–1918; 1939–1945
- Country: Canada
- Branch: (Canada) Canadian Army
- Type: Infantry
- Size: Brigade
- Part of: 2nd Canadian Infantry Division
- Engagements: World War I: Western Front; World War II: Dieppe Raid; Normandy; The Scheldt; The Rhineland; Battle of Groningen

Commanders
- Notable commanders: Hugh Andrew Young; Jean Victor Allard

Insignia
- 2nd Canadian Division Formation Patch

The 6th Canadian Infantry Brigade was an infantry brigade of the Canadian Army that fought during World War I and World War II. Raised in 1915, it formed part of the 2nd Canadian Division and fought on the Western Front during World War I before being disbanded. Later, it was re-raised in September 1939 and subsequently took part in Allied operations in north-west Europe in 1944 and 1945.

== History ==
=== World War I ===
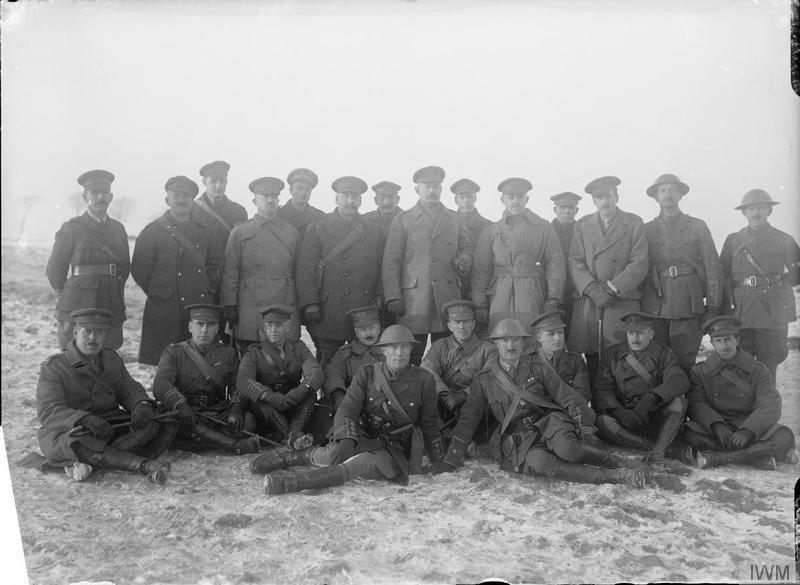
Canadian officers on the Western Front, including the 6th Brigade's commander, Brigadier-General Huntly Ketchen, December 1916

Formed in early 1915, the 6th Brigade formed part of the 2nd Canadian Division that was raised as part of the Canadian Expeditionary Force. Departing Canada in May 1915, further training was conducted in the United Kingdom around Shorncliffe before the brigade was committed to the Western Front in September 1915. The brigade's first major actions commenced early the following year around St Eloi, after which the brigade participated in many significant actions for the next two-and-a-half years that it was deployed along the Western Front.

=== World War II ===
==== Dieppe, Operation Jubilee ====
Mobilized as part of the 2nd Canadian Division on 1 September 1939, even before the declaration of war, and the battalions were promptly fleshed out by volunteers. However, further expansion was hindered by a temporary halt in recruitment and uncertainty about overseas deployment. Consequently, divisional and brigade headquarters were not actually formed until May and June 1940. Later, the brigade was transported to the United Kingdom, where in mid-1942 they took part in the Dieppe Raid. Codenamed Operation Jubilee, it was a large-scale raid on Dieppe, France in August 1942 carried out by the 4th and 6th Canadian Infantry Brigades, and support for British Commandos suffering extensive losses in the landing and the ensuing withdrawal.

The objective was to seize and hold a major port for a short period, both to prove it was possible and to gather intelligence from prisoners and captured materials while assessing the German responses. The raid was also intended to use air power to draw the Luftwaffe into a large, planned encounter. No major objectives of the raid were accomplished. 3,623 of the 6,086 men who made it ashore were either killed, wounded, or captured. The Allied air forces failed to lure the Luftwaffe into open battle, and lost 119 planes, while the Royal Navy suffered 555 casualties. The catastrophe at Dieppe later influenced Allied preparations for Operation Torch and Operation Overlord.

Because of heavy casualties most of the brigade's regiments had to go through substantial reconstruction throughout 1943 before seeing further action.

==== Normandy ====
The brigade did not participate in the D Day landings, but arrived in Normandy later that month and was involved in the operations to capture Caen. These included:

- Operation Charnwood
- Operation Atlantic
- Operation Spring

After the breakout from Normandy, 6th Canadian Infantry Brigade and 2nd Canadian Infantry Division captured Dieppe. Then they were involved in operations to clear the Rhine approaches and then cross the river and engagements in the forest of the Reichswald, and the towns of Xanten and Groningen. They ended the war in Hanover, Germany.

== Structure ==
=== World War I ===
During World War I, the 6th Brigade consisted of four infantry battalions:

- 27th (City of Winnipeg) Battalion Canadian Infantry: 21 October 1914 – 11 November 1918;
- 28th (North West) Battalion Canadian Infantry: 19 October 1914 – 11 November 1918;
- 29th (Vancouver) Battalion Canadian Infantry: 24 October 1914 – 11 November 1918;
- 31st (Alberta) Battalion Canadian Infantry: 16 November 1914 – 11 November 1918.

These four infantry battalions were supported by a machine gun company and trench mortar battery.

=== World War II ===
Upon formation in 1939 in the Prairie Provinces the 6th Brigade consisted of the following units:

- The Queen's Own Cameron Highlanders of Canada – Winnipeg, Manitoba
- The South Saskatchewan Regiment – Estevan, Saskatchewan
- The Calgary Highlanders – Calgary, Alberta
- The Winnipeg Grenadiers (Machine Gun) – Winnipeg, Manitoba
- No. 6 Defence Platoon (Lorne Scots) (6 Feb 1941 – 20 May 1943)

By 1944–45, the brigade had been re-structured into a triangular formation, consisting of the following units:

- 1st Battalion, Les Fusiliers Mont-Royal
- 1st Battalion, The Queen's Own Cameron Highlanders of Canada
- 1st Battalion, The South Saskatchewan Regiment
- 6th Infantry Brigade Ground Defence Platoon (Lorne Scots)

== Brigade Commanders during the Second World War ==
- Brigadier D.R. Sargent: 20 May 1940 – 23 August 1941
- Brigadier J.P. MacKenzie: 24 August 1941 – 15 January 1942
- Brigadier W.W. Southam: 16 January 1941 – 19 August 1942 (POW)
- (Position Vacant / under Acting Command): 20 August – 7 September 1942
- Brigadier H.A. Young: 8 September 1942 – 14 January 1943 (First Tenure)
- Brigadier G.A. McCarter: 15 January – 30 September 1943
- Brigadier G.S.N. Gostling: 1 October 1943 – 26 February 1944
- Brigadier H.A. Young: 27 February – 25 August 1944 (WIA) (Second Tenure)
- Brigadier F.A. Clift: 26 – 29 August 1944 (WIA)
- Brigadier J.G. Gauvreau: 30 August – 26 October 1944 (WIA)
- (Position Vacant / under Acting Command): 27 October – 9 November 1944
- Brigadier R.H. Keefler: 10 November 1944 – 22 March 1945
- Brigadier J.V. Allard: 23 March – Summer 1945
- (Position Vacant / under Acting Command): Summer – September 1945 (Disbanded)

== See also ==
- Canada in World War II
- Military history of Canada
- Canadian Armed Forces
