= George Tuccaro =

Canadian politician (born 1950)

Commissioner of the Northwest Territories
- In office May 12, 2010 – May 10, 2016
- Prime Minister: Stephen Harper; Justin Trudeau
- Premier: Floyd Roland; Bob McLeod
- Preceded by: Tony Whitford
- Succeeded by: Gerald Kisoun (acting)

Personal details
- Born: May 12, 1950 (age 76) Alberta
- Spouse: Marilyn
- Children: Daryl and Amanda

George Lester Tuccaro ONWT (born May 12, 1950) was the commissioner of the Northwest Territories. He served in that position from May 12, 2010, until May 10, 2016.

== Biography ==
George Tuccaro was born on May 12, 1950, in northern Alberta. A member of the Mikisew Cree First Nation, Tuccaro began a career in broadcasting in 1971, when he became an Announcer-Operator with CBC North Radio in Yellowknife, Northwest Territories. In 1979, Tuccaro joined the public service, becoming a communications officer with the Department of Indian and Northern Affairs. Leaving that position in 1981, Tuccaro returned to broadcasting by again joining CBC North as a Coordinator of Aboriginal Languages Programming. In this position, Tuccaro worked to develop the promotion of Aboriginal languages in radio broadcasting, as well as producing an internationally acclaimed radio documentary on the rate of teen suicide in the north of Canada. Between 1990 and 1991, Tuccaro was the Coordinator of the Cultural Industries Program, and created a booking agency for northern performing artists in the Northwest Territories. From then until 2002, Tuccaro hosted Trail's End, a CBC North Radio program, and served as the anchor of Northbeat, the first daily current affairs television program in Canada's north.

In 2002, Tuccaro retired from public broadcasting to start his own company, GLT Communications, through which he aimed to bring major events to the territory. Tuccaro has been awarded a Queen Elizabeth II Golden Jubilee Medal and a 125th Anniversary of the Confederation of Canada Medal. On May 12, 2010, Tuccaro was appointed Commissioner of the Northwest Territories. On May 10, 2016, Tuccaro retired from his position as Commissioner.

== Personal life ==
Tuccaro is married to his wife, Marilyn, and together they have two children, Daryl and Amanda.

== Arms ==
Coat of arms of George Tuccaro
Notes Granted 15 November 2012. Crest Issuant from a nest of mountain avens a demi-bald eagle displayed Proper charged on its breast with a cross pierced Or. Escutcheon Azure a fleur-de-lis Or charged in chief with a heart Gules. Supporters Two caribou bulls Proper the dexter charged with nine estoiles and the sinister with seven estoiles Or both standing on a grassy mount Vert billetty Or charged with four gemstones Argent above barry wavy Argent and Azure. Motto Healing One Heart At The Time
