= Roy Slemon =

Canadian air marshal (1904–1992)

Charles Roy Slemon
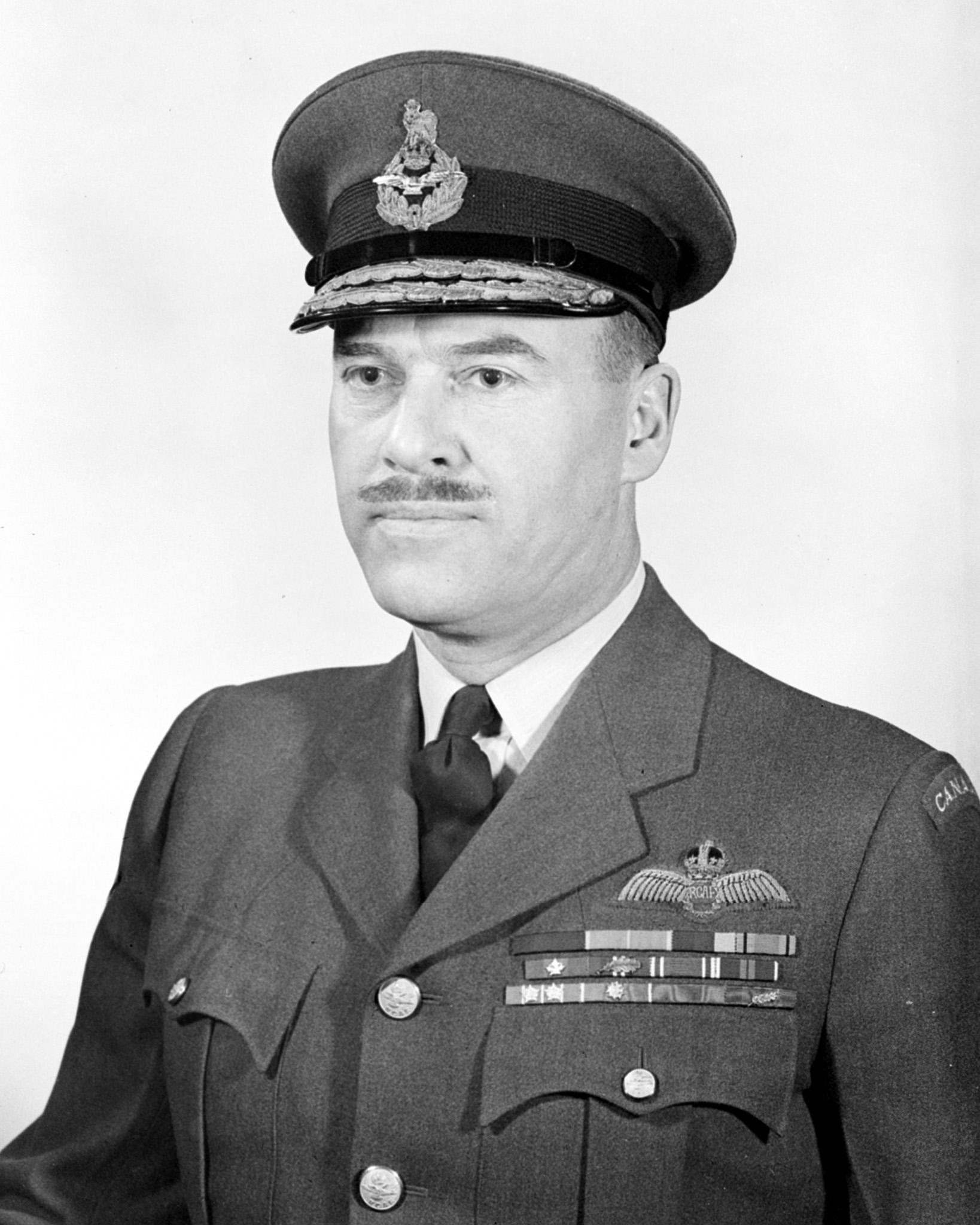
- Air Marshal Roy Slemon
- Born: 7 November 1904; Winnipeg, Manitoba
- Died: 12 February 1992 (aged 87); Colorado Springs, Colorado
- Military career
- Allegiance: Canada
- Branch: (Canada) Royal Canadian Air Force
- Service years: 1922–1964
- Rank: Air Marshal
- Commands: Western Air Command; Training Command
- Conflicts: World War II
- Awards: Companion of the Order of the Bath; Commander of the Order of the British Empire; Canadian Forces' Decoration

Air Marshal Charles Roy Slemon, CB, CBE, CD (7 November 1904 – 12 February 1992), known as Roy Slemon, was the Royal Canadian Air Force's Chief of the Air Staff from 1953 to 1957. In 1957 he was appointed as the first Deputy Commander of NORAD.

== Career ==
Slemon joined the Royal Canadian Air Force in 1922. After an early military career flying Vickers Vedettes, he served as Senior Staff Officer and then as the Commander of Canada's Western Air Command from 1938 to 1941. After a posting to the United Kingdom, Slemon became Senior Air Staff Officer at No. 6 (Canadian) Bomber Group in 1942. During the last year of World War II, Slemon was Deputy Air Officer Commander-in-Chief of the RCAF Overseas.

Slemon became Air Officer Commanding Training Command at CFB Trenton in 1949, Chief of the Air Staff in 1953 and Deputy Commander in Chief of NORAD in 1957.

On 5 October 1960, warning lights in Cheyenne Mountain Complex indicated that the BMEWS site at Thule Air Base, Greenland, was detecting a possible ICBM attack. On the five-position scale, the reports were level three, requiring Cheyenne to contact NORAD headquarters, the US Joint Chiefs of Staff, the Canadian Chiefs of Staff Committee, and Strategic Air Command (SAC). The commander on duty at that time was Colonel Robert Gould, whose first call was to NORAD's commander General Laurence Kuter, who was at that time flying and could not be contacted.

His next call was to NORAD's second-in-command, Slemon, then located in Cheyenne's counterpart at CFB North Bay. While the call was being connected, the alert status went to level 4, and then 5, indicating the BMEWS site was almost positive an attack was underway, and giving Slemon the authority to order the immediate release of SAC's Airborne Alert force for attack on the USSR. By the time the call was connected, Brigadier General Harris Hull, NORAD's chief of intelligence, joined the call. After the situation was explained, Slemon asked where Khrushchev was at that moment. Hull replied that he was in New York City attending the United Nations. Slemon considered it extremely unlikely that an attack would take place that would likely kill Khrushchev, and asked Hull if there were any intelligence indications that such an attack was being prepared. Hull answered no, and Slemon broke protocol to call off further escalation of the now level-5 alert.

Slemon then ordered that the BMEWS based be contacted directly. When they did, it was discovered that the signals were indicating an attack by as many as 1,000 missiles (at that time the Soviets had four ICBMs in service) but there were oddities about the signal. In particular, the signal timing seemed to indicate the targets were at a very long distance, while the computer was reporting they were about 2,200 miles (3,500 km) away. After much confusion, it was discovered that the radar was detecting the rising Moon. On further exploration, it was found that the computer program that reported distances was dropping digits, so only the remainder of the digits were being displayed, leaving what appeared to be a credible measurement.

Slemon retired to Colorado Springs in 1964.

Slemon Park in Summerside, Prince Edward Island is named after him.

Military offices
Preceded by W Curtis	Chief of the Air Staff (RCAF); 1953 – 1957	Succeeded by H L Campbell
New title NORAD established	Deputy Commander of NORAD; 1957 – 1964	Succeeded by C R Dunlap
