= Chris Burn =

British-Canadian geomorphologist

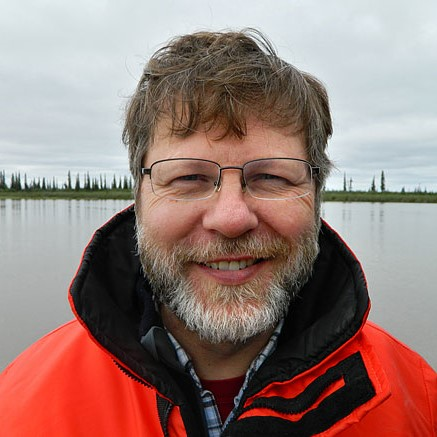
- Born: Christopher Robert Burn
- Citizenship: United Kingdom and Canada
- Education: Durham University (BSc); Carleton University (MA, PhD)
- Awards: Polar Medal (2018)
- Scientific career
- Fields: Geomorphology
- Workplaces: University of British Columbia; Carleton University
- Thesis: On the origin of aggradational ice in permafrost (1986)
- Doctoral advisor: Mike Smith
- Website: https://carleton.ca/geography/cu-people/burn-chris/

Christopher Robert Burn, known more commonly as Chris Burn, is a British-Canadian geomorphologist. He is emeritus Chancellor's Professor in the Department of Geography and Environmental Studies at Carleton University, having retired in July 2025.

== Education ==
Burn graduated from Durham University in 1981 with a first-class degree in geography. He continued his studies in Canada on a Commonwealth Scholarship, receiving his MA in geography in 1983 and PhD in geology in 1986, both from Carleton University.

== Career and research ==
Burn is a specialist in the study of permafrost and periglacial processes in northern Canada. Beginning in the early 1980s, he conducted fieldwork in the Yukon, the Mackenzie Delta, and Banks Island. His research has revolved around the factors controlling permafrost distribution, geomorphic processes in permafrost landscapes, and the implications of climate warming for communities and infrastructure within the Canadian Arctic.

He was a postdoc under John Ross Mackay at the University of British Columbia, and subsequently research fellow at the same institution before rejoining Carleton in 1992. He held the NSERC Senior Northern Research Chair at the Department of Geography and Environmental Studies from 2002 to 2012. He is a former president of the International Permafrost Association.

During his career he has collaborated with various bodies on mitigating the impact of climate change in northern Canada, including the Vuntut Gwitchin First Nation and Parks Canada. He was also hired to research the resilience of the Dempster Highway to climate change, and was a consultant to the decision-making processes on the Mackenzie Gas Project and the Inuvik-Tuktoyaktuk Highway review.

== Honours ==
In 2018 he was awarded the Polar Medal by the Governor General of Canada, Julie Payette.

== Selected publications ==
=== Conference papers ===
- Burn, C. R.; Moore, J. L.; O’Neill, H. B.; Hayley, D. W.; Trimble, J. R.; Calmels, F.; Orban, S. N.; Idrees, M. (21–23 September 2015). Permafrost characterization of the Dempster Highway, Yukon and Northwest Territories (PDF). Proceedings of the 68th Canadian Geotechnical Conference and 7th Canadian Permafrost Conference. Quebec City, QC: Canadian Geotechnical Society. pp. Paper 705, 8 pp.

=== Journal articles ===
- Burn, C. R. (1997). "Cryostratigraphy, paleogeography, and climate change during the early Holocene warm interval, western Arctic coast, Canada" (PDF). Canadian Journal of Earth Sciences. 34 (7): 912–925. doi:10.1139/e17-076.
- ——— (2002). "Tundra lakes and permafrost, Richards Island, western Arctic coast, Canada" (PDF). Canadian Journal of Earth Sciences. 39 (8): 1281–1298. doi:10.1139/e02-035.
- ———; Kokelj, S. V. (2009). "The environment and permafrost of the Mackenzie Delta area". Permafrost and Periglacial Processes. 20 (2): 83–105. doi:10.1002/ppp.655.
- ———; Zhang, Y. (2009). "Permafrost and climate change at Herschel Island (Qikiqtaruq), Yukon Territory, Canada". Journal of Geophysical Research: Earth Surface. 114 (F2): F02001. doi:10.1029/2008JF001087.
