= Arctic Inspiration Prize =

The Arctic Inspiration Prize is a $1 million CAD annual Canadian prize awarded to up to five diverse teams who have made a substantial, demonstrated and distinguished contribution to the gathering of Arctic knowledge and who have provided a concrete plan and commitment to implement their knowledge into real world application for the benefit of the Canadian Arctic and its Peoples. The Arctic Inspiration Prize defines the Canadian Arctic as the region including the Yukon, the Northwest Territories, the Inuvialuit Settlement Region, Nunavut, Nunavik and Nunatsiavut.

== About the Prize ==
The Arctic Inspiration Prize, also known as the Nobel Prize of the North, accepts nominations that address causes rather than symptoms of one or more of the following priority areas in the Canadian Arctic: Education, Human Health, Socio-Cultural Issues, Environment and Economy. The Prize recognizes and encourages teamwork and collaboration among diverse groups and organizations, from North and South. Prizes, with associated awards totaling $1 million CAD, are presented annually to distinguished teams on a competitive basis. The awards are to be used towards the proposed knowledge implementation plan; they are not personal cash prizes. The Prize is not intended as a "lifetime achievement" award or to give appreciation for one great accomplishment. It does not recognize individual achievements but encourages team efforts in transforming Arctic knowledge into tangible outcomes.

The Arctic Inspiration Prize is managed on a voluntary basis by the ArcticNet Network of Centres of Excellence of Canada. The Arctic Inspiration Prize (AIP) was launched at the International Polar Year conference held in Montreal in April 2012.

== Selection Committee ==
The Arctic Inspiration Prize Selection Committee is made up of individuals known for their commitment to the Canadian Arctic and its Peoples. Members of the Selection Committee include:

Current Members

- Eva Aariak (former premier of Nunavut)
- Michel Allard (Professor, Centre for Northern Studies, University Laval)
- Nellie J. Cournoyea (Chair and chief executive officer, Inuvialuit Regional Corporation (IRC), former premier of the Northwest Territories)
- Martin Fortier (Executive Director, Arctic Inspiration Prize and ArcticNet)
- Thomas Anguti Johnston (former president, National Inuit Youth Council)
- Kyla Kakfwi-Scott (Senior Advisor (Department of Health and Social Services)
- Peter Mansbridge (Chief Correspondent, CBC News and Anchor, The National)
- Tom Paddon, (Chairman, Baffinland Iron Mines Corporation)
- Jobie Tukkiapik (President, Makivik Corporation)
- Geraldine Van Bibber (Senior Community Advisor, office of the premier, Yukon; former commissioner of Yukon)
- Arnold Witzig (director, S. and A. Inspiration Foundation)

Past Members

- Susan Aglukark (Inuk singer, songwriter and Juno Award winner)
- Erin Freeland Ballantyne (Rhodes Scholar and founder of Dechinta: Bush University Center for Research and Learning)

p* Peter Harrison (Professor, Stauffer-Dunning Chair and director, School of Policy Studies, Queen's University)

- The Right Honorable Michaelle Jean (Secretary General of La Francophonie, Co-President of Michaelle Jean Foundation)
- Sheila Watt-Cloutier (Nobel Peace Prize nominee and Inuit activist)

== Ambassadors ==
Candidates must be nominated by third party Arctic Inspiration Prize Ambassadors who are knowledgeable about the team's activities. Ambassadors include various groups, organizations, companies and governmental agencies and whose engaged participation ensures that groups from diverse Northern communities can be nominated. Ambassadors voluntarily invest their time seeking out, encouraging, and mentoring eligible teams and putting together their nominations. AIP Ambassadors make sure that information about the Prize is available at the grass roots level across diverse communities, actively seek out teams and projects, and encourage/help/mentor/nominate teams.

Ambassadors (as of March 2016)

- Aarluk Consulting Inc.
- Arctic Institute of North America
- Aurora Research Institute
- Baffin Regional Chamber of Commerce
- Canadian Museum of Nature
- FOXY (Fostering Open eXpression among Youth)
- Government of Nunavut
- Imaituk Inc.
- Indigenous and Northern Affairs Canada
- Institute for Circumpolar Health Research
- Inuit Tapiriit Kanatami
- Kativik Regional Government
- Kitikmeot Inuit Association
- Kivalliq Inuit Association
- Labrador North Chamber of Commerce
- Lumos Energy
- Fisheries and Marine Institute of Memorial University of Newfoundland
- Mitacs Inc.
- Nunatsiavut Government
- Nunavut Economic Developers Association (NEDA)
- Nunavut Literacy Council
- Nunavut Research Institute
- Nunavut Sivuniksavut
- Nunavut Tunngavik
- Polar Knowledge Canada
- Qikiqtani Inuit Association
- School of Social Work – University of British Columbia
- Students on Ice
- The Circle on Philanthropy and Aboriginal Peoples in Canada
- The Mining Association of Canada
- World Wildlife Fund (Canada)
- Yukon Chamber of Commerce
- Yukon Chamber of Mines
- Yukon Research Centre

== 2012 Laureates ==
The first Arctic Inspiration Prize ceremony was held in Vancouver, BC, Canada, on 13 December 2012. Four teams shared the $1 million award: The Arctic Food Network, the Nunavut Literacy Council, Inuit Qaujimajatuqangit and the Thaidene Nene Initiative.

- The Arctic Food Network set out to help develop country food-gathering systems to alleviate food insecurity in Nunavut: "The Arctic Food Network received $360,000 to assist with its food-gathering system that enables communities to strengthen traditions of hunting and sharing. Comprised of a variety of cabins, sheds and supporting infrastructure that merge architecture, landscape, cold climate technology and Inuit culture, the network will lead to the acquisition, storage, preparation, distribution, and celebration of country food, and other locally-sourced food."

Team members: Lucassie Arragutainaq, Bert Dean, Alan Everard, James Ford, Morgan Ip, Jack Kabvitok, Lola Sheppard, Mason White (Team leader)

- The Nunavut Literacy Council set out to embed literacy skill development in non-formal education programs for youth: "The Nunavut Literacy Council received $300,000 in recognition of their knowledge to action plan to embed literacy into high-quality, culturally-based programming for the benefit of individuals, families, and communities across the North."

Team members: Cayla Chenier, Kim Crockatt (Team leader), Graeme Dargo, George Dunkerley, Sue Folinsbee, Brendan Griebel, Adriana Kusugak, Pujjuut Kusugak, Quluaq Pilakapsi, Shelley Tulloch, Gloria Uluqsi, Anna Ziegler

- The Inuit Qaujimajatuqangit team set out to develop a book on Inuit culture and knowledge that will serve as a resource for academics, researchers, educators and the next generation of Inuit: "An experienced team of Inuit Elders, facilitators and academics are proposing to help preserve Inuit culture and heritage through the provision of a definitive body of work, a book entitled-- Inuit Qaujimajatuqangit — What Inuit have always known to be true — that communicates Inuit worldview in detail. Inuit Qaujimajatuqangit received $240,000 for its book project which will serve as a resource for academics, researchers, educators and the next generation of Inuit."

Team members: Attoat Akittirq, Norman Attangala, Lou Angalik, Jose Angutingnungniq, Alice Ayalik, Joe Karetak, Rodah Karetak, Elisapee Kidlapik, Bernadette Otuk, Shirley Tagalik (Team leader), Donald Uluadluak

- The Thaidene Nene Initiative set out to consolidate the stewardship, protection and co-management of a national park reserve of great cultural and environmental significance to the Lustel K'e Dene First Nation: "In recognition of their knowledge to action plan to promote the responsibility and capacity of aboriginal peoples to act as stewards of their traditional territories, using their own ways of knowing and doing, in meaningful partnership with the rest of Canada, the Thaidene Nene Initiative received $100,000 to contribute to the stewardship, protection and co-management of the proposed national park reserve in Canada's North West Territories."

Team members: Deneen Allen, Stephen Ellis, Dora Enzoe (Team leader), Gloria Enzoe, Mike Filipowitsch, Larry Innes, Erica Janes, Steven Nitah, Mike Palmer, Francois Paulette, Council of the Lutsel K'e Dene First Nation, Thaidene Nene Negotiations Advisory Committee

== 2013 Laureates ==
The second Arctic Inspiration Prize ceremony was held in Halifax, NS, Canada, on 11 December 2013. Three teams shared the $1 million award: Ikaarvik: From Barriers to Bridges, The National Strategy on Inuit Education – National Parent Mobilization Initiative, and SakKijânginnatuk Nunalik: Healthy homes in thriving Nunatsiavut communities.

- The Ikaarvik: From Barriers to Bridges team set out to foster knowledge-sharing between five Northern communities and Southern institutions: "From Barriers to Bridges received $325,000 for their plan to establish lasting relationships between the five Northern communities of Cambridge Bay, Pond Inlet, Kugluktuk, Pangnirtung and Gjoa Haven, and five of the largest zoos and aquariums in Southern Canada (Assiniboine Park Zoo, Aquarium du Québec, Ecomuseum Zoo, Vancouver Aquarium, Toronto Zoo). With a potential to reach over 11 million Canadian and international visitors annually, the project will help provide the public with a more accurate understanding of the Canadian Arctic and its peoples. Via ARCTIConnection at Université du Québec à Rimouski, the five Northern communities will also be linked with southern scientists in different fields of research relevant to their needs.

Team members: Shelly Elverum, Vincent L'Hérault, Eric Solomon (Team Leader), Bill Williams, Hamlet of Gjoa Haven, Hamlet of Kugluktuk, Hamlet of Pangnirtung, Hamlet of Pond Inlet, Municipality of Cambridge Bay, Assiniboine Park Zoo, Aquarium du Québec, Ecomuseum Zoo, Vancouver Aquarium, Toronto Zoo.

- The National Strategy on Inuit Education - National Parent Mobilization Initiative team set out to improve education outcomes in the North: "The National Committee on Inuit Education and the Amaujaq National Centre for Inuit Education received $325,000 for their knowledge to action plan to mobilize parents, with the key message: "Getting children to school every day, all day, well rested and ready to learn". Through media support, regional roundtables and conferences, community-targeted initiatives, profiling of success stories, and the creation of parent toolkits with tips on how parents can support their children's education, the National Parent Mobilization Initiative is focused on encouraging northern students to attend school regularly and succeed."

Team members: Peter Geikie, Kevin Kablutsiak, Heather Ochalski, Mary Simon (Team Leader).

- The Sakkijânginnatuk Nunalik: Healthy Homes in Thriving Nunatsiavut Communities team set out to draw on local Inuit knowledge, professional assessments and literature reviews to tackle the major housing crisis in the northern Labrador Inuit region of Nunatsiavut: "SakKijânginnatuk Nunalik: Healthy homes in thriving Nunatsiavut communities received $350,000 for their plan to use this knowledge to build and monitor Nunatsiavut's first sustainable, multi-unit residential dwelling and establish a prototype for Northern housing development that addresses the changing northern climate, infrastructure requirements and Inuit housing needs and preferences."

Team members: Tony Andersen, Dorothy Angnatok, Trevor Bell, Christina Goldhar, Isabella Pain (Team Leader), Carla Pamak, Dan Pottle, Tom Sheldon, Darryl Shiwak, Katie Winters.

== 2014 Laureates ==
The third Arctic Inspiration Prize ceremony was held in Ottawa, ON, Canada, on December 10, 2014. The ceremony was held at the Shaw Center in conjunction with the Arctic Change conference. The $1 million prize was awarded to one team: FOXY (Fostering Open Expression Among Youth)

- the FOXY team set to address sexual health knowledge gaps and misconceptions through sexual health workshops, peer leadership, and community-based actions. The team works with young men and women in the North to promote discussion of sexual health and to build self-confidence for healthy decision making. The team is led by Candice Lys, who grew up in the Northwest Territories and completed her master's degree in public health by examining sexual health in the region.

Team members: Jane Dragon, Jeremy Emerson, Gwen Healey, Veronica Johnny, Carmen Logie, Candice Lys (Team leader), Kayley Mackay, Nancy MacNeill, Graeme Peters, Teresa Watson, Makenzie Zouboules.

== 2015 Laureates ==
The fourth Arctic Inspiration Prize ceremony was held in Ottawa, ON, Canada, on January 27, 2016. The ceremony was held in conjunction with Northern Lights 2016. An additional $0.5 million was granted out during the ceremony for a total $1.5 million reward split by three groups: Better Hearing in Education for Northern Youth (BHENY), Qaggiq: Nurturing the Arctic Performing Arts, and Tri-Territorial Recreation Training (TRT) Project.

- The Better Hearing in Education for Northern Youth (BHENY) team aims to tackle education barriers for children and youth living with hearing loss in the Baffin region of Nunavut. The BHENY team received $300,000 to introduce amplification technology and training to classrooms and educators in the region. Currently, additional barriers experienced by youth with hearing loss are thought to contribute to poor literacy, academic success, school attendance, and graduation rates.

Team members: Christy Douwsma, Mary Etuangat, Barbara Holmes, Kim Hurley, Tracy MacMillan, Ben McCarl, Lynne McCurdy (Team Leader), Pam Millett, Heather Moffett, Sandra Roberts, Ningeola Tiglik, David Webber

- The Qaggiq: Nurturing the Arctic Performing Arts team received $600,000 to promote engagement in arts in the North. Through promoting performing arts, the team aims to build the self-worth, sense of belonging, cultural value and pride, and resilience in the North, particularly among youth.

Team members: Tiffany Ayalik, Martha Burns, Geneviève Cimon, Beatrice Deer, Ellen Hamilton (Team Leader), Natasha Harwood, Sarah Olayok Jancke, Zacharius Kunuk, Kathleen Ivaluarjuk Merritt, Alisa Palmer, Aaju Peter, Laakkuluk Williamson Bathory

- The Tri-Territorial Recreation Training (TRT) Project team received $600,000 to promote recreation and build recreational leadership capacities across the Yukon, Northwest Territories, and Nunavut. The project aims to improve health, strengthen communities, and enhance quality of life in northern communities. Team members draw from recreation experience in government, non-for-profit, and private sectors.

Team members: Dawn Currie, Brenda Herchmer, Anne Morgan (Team Leader), Geoff Ray, Caroline Sparks

== Award Ceremony ==
The Arctic Inspiration Prize Awards Ceremony is held annually in conjunction with the ArcticNet Annual Scientific Meeting in early December. Laureates are awarded a Diploma of recognition as well as an original work of art from a Canadian Arctic artist alongside the Prize. The Awards Ceremony also features musical performances by Northern artists.

- 2012: December 13, Vancouver, BC, Canada.
- 2013: December 11, Halifax, NS, Canada.
- 2014: December 10, Ottawa, ON, Canada.
- 2015: January 27, Ottawa, ON, Canada.
- 2016: December 8, Winnipeg, MB, Canada.

== See also ==
- Governor General's Northern Medal
