= Gerald Kisoun =

Commissioner of the Northwest Territories

The Honourable Gerald Kisoun KStJ ONWT
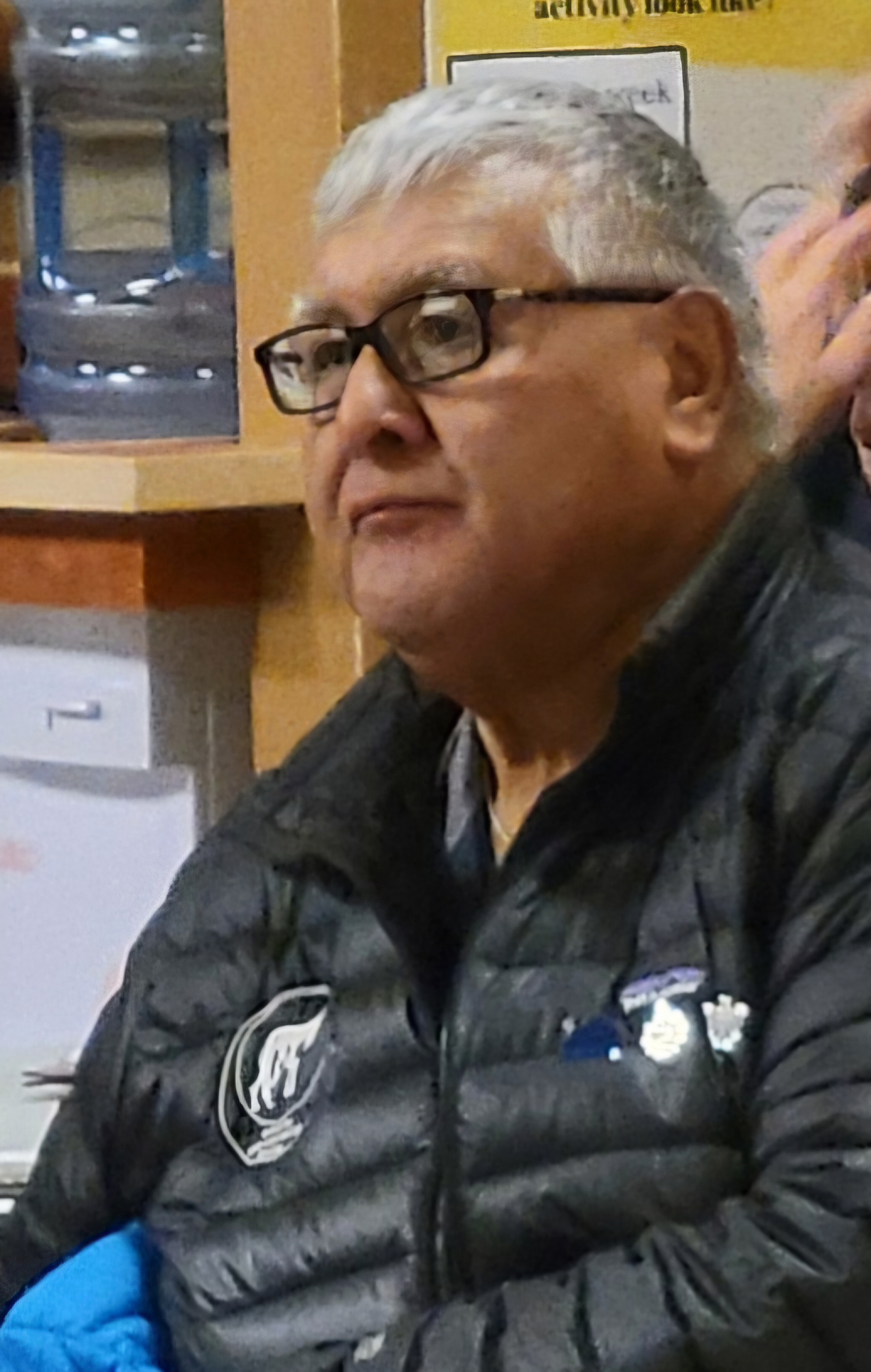
- Gerald Kisoun in February 2025

Commissioner of the Northwest Territories
- Incumbent
- Assumed office May 14, 2024
- Prime Minister: Justin Trudeau; Mark Carney
- Premier: R.J. Simpson
- Preceded by: Margaret Thom

Personal details
- Born: 1953 (age 72–73) Northwest Territories, Canada

Gerald W. Kisoun ONWT (born 1953) is the commissioner of the Northwest Territories since 2024. He was the deputy commissioner of the Northwest Territories from 2011 to 2017. He served as acting commissioner of the Northwest Territories between the retirement of George Tuccaro on 10 May 2016 and the appointment of Margaret Thom in June 2017.

== Personal life ==
Kisoun was born in 1953 in the Mackenzie Delta area and is of Inuvialuit and Gwich'in heritage.

Kisoun has four grown children, five grandchildren, and two great-grandchildren.

== Biography ==
Kisoun was a member of the Royal Canadian Mounted Police (RCMP) for twenty-five years, from 1971 to 1996. He started as a Special Constable in 1971 before invited to attend the RCMP Training Academy in 1974 and graduated in 1975 to serve in Alberta and Yukon. He then served in Tuktoyaktuk and Inuvik from 1986 to 1996 as an RCMP officer. After retiring from the RCMP, he worked for 17 years with Parks Canada, within the Western Arctic Field Unit, where he liaised with local schools and advocated for students’ science and cultural heritage education.

Kisoun has served on various boards and committees, including the Northwest Territories Tourism Board, the Gwich’in Land and Water Board, the Gwich’in Land Use Planning Board, the RCMP Commanding Officers’ Indigenous Advisory Committee, and the Board of the Inuvik Community Corporation’s Elders Committee. He has also dedicated time to the Muskrat Jamboree Committee and the Northern Games Society, most recently as its President and Chair.

In 2015, Kisoun was awarded Canada's Polar Medal; in the citation he was described as a "well-respected Elder" who had "worked tirelessly at strengthening the awareness and understanding of northern Canada and its peoples".

In February 2016, Herbert Nakimayak made a Members' Statement in the Legislative Assembly of the Northwest Territories about Kisoun's cultural contribution.

== Honours ==
Gerald Kisoun's full medal entitlement is as follows.

Ribbon	Description	Notes
	Order of St John (K.StJ)	Knight of Justice.; Vice Prior of the Order in the Northwest Territories
	Order of the Northwest Territories (OWNT)	2024.
	Polar Medal	2015.
	125th Anniversary of the Confederation of Canada Medal	1992.
	Queen Elizabeth II Diamond Jubilee Medal	2012.; Canadian Version of this Medal.
	Royal Canadian Mounted Police Long Service Medal	With 25 year Bar
