= NWT Squash =

NWT Squash (sometimes known as Squash NWT) is a non-profit Sport Governing Body which is operated by an elected volunteer Board of Directors. Funding is obtained from Department of Municipal and Community Affairs (MACA, Government of the Northwest Territories).

The mission of NWT Squash is to develop and expand the participation of athletes of all ages in the game of squash by organizing a diverse selection of programs, and activities to suit current and potential members. NWT Squash's vision is to expand the game of squash in as throughout the Northwest Territories and to make squash available to any youth who wishes to participate.

NWT Squash is officially known as the Northwest Territories Squash Racquets Association.

== Where to play in the NWT ==
Three communities in the Northwest Territories have squash courts. In Yellowknife, the territorial capital, The Racquet Club has four regulation sized courts. Members can pay a monthly fee and drop in fees are available if you are travelling from out-of-town. In Inuvik, two courts are housed at the Midnight Sun Complex. Drop-ins are welcome and punch passes are available. In Fort Smith, one court is available at the Fort Smith Recreation and Community Centre.
