= Air marshal =

Air-officer rank

Air marshal (Air Mshl or AM) is an air-officer rank used by some air forces, with origins from the Royal Air Force. The rank is used by the air forces of many countries which have historical British influence, including many Commonwealth nations. The rank is usually equivalent to a vice admiral or a lieutenant general.

Air marshal is immediately senior to the rank of air vice-marshal and immediately subordinate to the rank of air chief marshal. Officers in the rank of air marshal typically hold very senior appointments such as commander-in-chief of an air force or a large air force formation. Officers in the ranks of air chief marshal and air vice-marshal are also referred to generically as air marshals. Occasionally, air force officers of marshal rank are considered to be air marshals.

== Australia ==
The Australian Air Corps adopted the RAF rank system on 9 November 1920 and this usage was continued by its successor, the Royal Australian Air Force. However, the rank of air marshal was not used by the Australian Armed Forces until 1940 when Richard Williams, an RAAF officer, was promoted.

In Australia, there are four appointments available for air marshals: the Chief of Air Force and, at times when they are occupied by an air force officer, the Vice Chief of Defence Force, the Chief of Joint Operations, and the Chief of Capability Development Group.

== Canada ==
The Royal Canadian Air Force (RCAF) used the rank until the 1968 unification of the Canadian Forces, when army-type rank titles were adopted and an air marshal became a lieutenant-general. In official Canadian French usage, the rank title was maréchal de l'air. The Canadian Chief of the Air Staff ordinarily held the rank of air marshal. The following RCAF officers held the rank (dates in rank in parentheses):

- Billy Bishop (1938 to 1944), rank retained on retirement
- George Croil (c. 1940 to 1944), rank retained on retirement
- Lloyd Samuel Breadner (1941 to 1945), subsequently promoted to air chief marshal
- Gus Edwards (1942 to 1944), rank retained on retirement
- Albert Cuffe (1942 to 1944), rank retained on retirement
- Robert Leckie (1944 to 1947), rank retained on retirement
- George Owen Johnson (to 1947), rank retained on retirement
- Wilfred Curtis (c. 1947 to 1953), rank retained on retirement
- Roy Slemon (c. 1953 to 1964), rank retained on retirement
- Frank Robert Miller (1955 to 1961), subsequently promoted to air chief marshal
- Hugh Campbell (1957 to 1962), rank retained on retirement
- Clare Annis (1962 to 1966), rank retained on retirement
- Clarence Dunlap (1962 to 1968), rank retained on retirement
- William Ross MacBrien (1958 to 1968), rank retained on retirement
- Edwin Reyno (1966 to 1968), later regraded to lieutenant-general

== India ==
The rank of air marshal was the highest in the Indian Air Force (IAF), held by the Chief of the Air Staff (CAS), from 1947 to 1966. In 1966, the rank of CAS was upgraded to air chief marshal and ACM Arjan Singh became the first CAS to hold the four-star rank.

== Namibia ==
The Namibian Air Force adopted the RAF rank system in 2010 previously having been using army ranks and insignia. However the rank of air marshal was not used until 1 April 2020 when Martin Pinehas was promoted to that rank and appointed as Chief of the Namibian Defence Force.

== New Zealand ==
In New Zealand, the head of the air force holds the lower rank of air vice-marshal. However, when an air force officer holds the country's senior military appointment, Chief of the New Zealand Defence Force, he is granted the rank of air marshal. The current Chief of Defence Force is an RNZAF officer, Air Marshal Tony Davies.

Other officers to hold the air marshal rank in New Zealand are:

- Sir Richard Bolt, promoted 1976, retired 1980
- Sir Ewan Jamieson, promoted 1983
- David Crooks, promoted 1986
- Carey Adamson
- Sir Bruce Ferguson, promoted 2001

== United Kingdom ==
Air Marshal
- Shoulder board and sleeve insignia

- Masthead distinguishing flag

- Motor car star plate
- Country: United Kingdom
- Service branch: Royal Air Force
- Abbreviation: Air Mshl / AM
- Rank group: Officers of air rank
- Rank: Three-star rank
- NATO rank code: OF-8
- Formation: 1 August 1919
- Next higher rank: Air chief marshal
- Next lower rank: Air vice-marshal
- Equivalent ranks: Vice-admiral (RN); Lieutenant-general (British Army; RM)

=== Origins ===
Prior to the adoption of RAF-specific rank titles in 1919, it was suggested that the RAF might use the Royal Navy's officer ranks, with the word "air" inserted before the naval rank title. For example, the rank that later became air marshal would have been air vice-admiral. The Admiralty objected to any use of their rank titles, including this modified form, and so an alternative proposal was put forward: air-officer ranks would be based on the term "ardian", which was derived from a combination of the Gaelic words for "chief" (ard) and "bird" (eun), with the term "second ardian" or "wing ardian" being used specifically for the rank equivalent to a vice-admiral and lieutenant-general. However, air marshal was preferred and has been used since its adoption in August 1919. Sir Hugh Trenchard, the incumbent Chief of the Air Staff when the rank was introduced, became the first air marshal on 11 August 1919.

=== RAF insignia, command flag and star plate ===
The rank insignia consists of two narrow light blue bands (each on a slightly wider black band) over a light blue band on a broad black band. This is worn on the lower sleeves of the dress uniform or on shoulders of the flying suit or working uniform.

The command flag for an air marshal is defined by the single broad red band running in the centre of the flag.

The vehicle star plate for an air marshal depicts three white stars (air marshal is equivalent to a three-star rank) on an air force blue background.

== Other language variants ==
In the Brazilian Air Force, the highest rank is Marechal-do-ar, a five-star officer, which can be translated as "air marshal" or "marshal of the air". The rank is equivalent to marshal in the Brazilian Army or marshal of the air force elsewhere.

In 1927, the rank of Luftmarsk (transl. air marshal) was proposed by Christian Førslev as a rank for the potential Chief of the Royal Danish Air Force. The rank would have been equivalent to a major general.

== Gallery ==
(Royal Australian Air Force)

(Bangladesh Air Force)

Marechal-do-ar
(Brazilian Air Force)

(Ghana Air Force)

(Indian Air Force)

(Namibian Air Force)

(Nigerian Air Force)

(Pakistan Air Force)

(Sri Lanka Air Force)

(Royal Air Force)

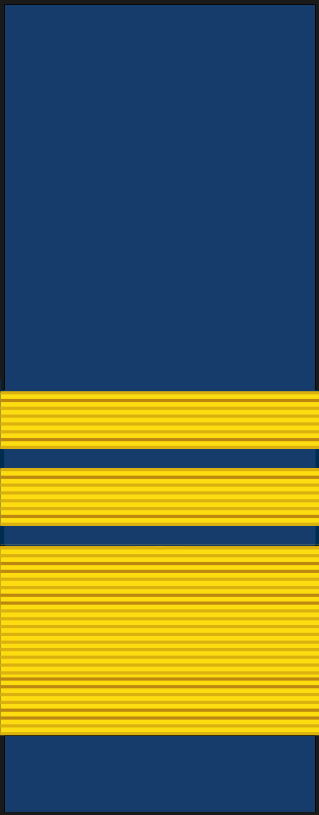
(Air Force of Zimbabwe)

== See also ==
- Air force officer rank insignia
- British and U.S. military ranks compared
- Comparative military ranks
- RAF officer ranks
- Ranks of the RAAF
