= William Ross MacBrien =

Canadian Air Force officer (1913–1986)

- Air Vice-Marshal MacBrien
- Born: 1913
- Died: 1986 (aged 72–73)
- Military career
- Allegiance: Canada
- Branch: Royal Canadian Air Force
- Service years: 1935 to 1969
- Rank: Air Marshal

Air Marshal William Ross MacBrien, OBE, CD, RCAF (1913–1986), commonly known as Bill MacBrien or Iron Bill, was a senior Royal Canadian Air Force officer during World War II and a senior commander in the 1950s and 60s.

MacBrien was born in 1913 in the United Kingdom. He joined the Royal Canadian Air Force in 1935 and during World War II he commanded a Canadian fighter sector in continental Europe. In the early 1950s, he was a senior staff officer at the Headquarters of Canada's Air Defence Command in Saint-Hubert, Quebec before being appointed to further staff duties at No. 4 ATAF at Lansberg in Germany.

In September 1958 MacBrien took over as Air Officer Commanding Air Defence Command. Deputy commander in chief at the SHAPE HQ in Belgium in 1967. From August 1967 to January 1969 MacBrien was the Deputy Commander of North American Aerospace Defense Command (NORAD).

MacBrien died in 1986.

Military offices
Preceded by C R Dunlap	Deputy Commander of NORAD; 1967 – 1969	Succeeded by F R Sharp
