= List of Northwest Territories deputy commissioners =

This is a list of deputy commissioners of the Northwest Territories, Canada that have served since the position was created in 1921.

Deputy commissioners	Date appointed	Date retired
Roy A. Gibson	June 16, 1921	October 3, 1950
Frank J. G. Cunningham	June 26, 1951	April 10, 1957
Wilfred G. Brown	April 10, 1957	July 23, 1965
Stuart Milton Hodgson	August 1, 1965	March 1, 1967
John Havelock Parker	March 2, 1967	April 14, 1979
Robert S. Pilot	November 8, 1979	December 9, 1983
Agnes Semmler	September 17, 1984	October 26, 1987
Ann Meekitjuk Hanson	October 26, 1987	March 3, 1992
Helen Maksagak	March 3, 1992	December 21, 1994
Daniel Joseph Marion	July 19, 1995	March 26, 1999
Cal Mains	October 25, 2001	June 11, 2004
Tony Whitford	October 21, 2004	April 29, 2005
Margaret Thom	June 2, 2005	October 2011
Gerald Kisoun	October 24, 2011	2017
Leonard Kenny	December 18, 2019	Present
