= John Tetlichi =

Canadian politician

John Tetlichi was a Canadian politician, who served on the 6th Northwest Territories Legislative Council from 1967 to 1970.

At the time, the council retained a mixture of both elected and appointed seats. Tetlichi, a Dene chief, was appointed to the council in 1967 as its first First Nations member, to improve First Nations representation in government. He served until 1970, when he ran for an elected seat in Mackenzie Delta in the 1970 Northwest Territories general election, but was defeated by Lyle Trimble.
