= Hugh H. Rowatt =

Canadian politician (1861–1938)

Hugh Howard Rowatt CMG

Commissioner of the Northwest Territories
- In office March 31, 1931 – April 30, 1934
- Preceded by: William Wallace Cory
- Succeeded by: Charles Camsell

Personal details
- Born: August 17, 1861
- Died: November 13, 1938 (aged 77)
- Spouse: Frances Adelaid Cummings (m. 1892)
- Children: 4

Hugh Howard Rowatt, CMG (August 17, 1861 – November 13, 1938) was a Canadian civil servant who served as the commissioner of the Northwest Territories between 1931 and 1934.

A civil servant with the Department of Interior, Howlatt was appointed Commissioner of the Northwest Territories on March 31, 1931, serving until April 30, 1934. At the age of 69, he remains the older person to ever be sworn into the office.
