= Margaret Thom =

Canadian politician

The Honourable Margaret Thom DStJ ONWT
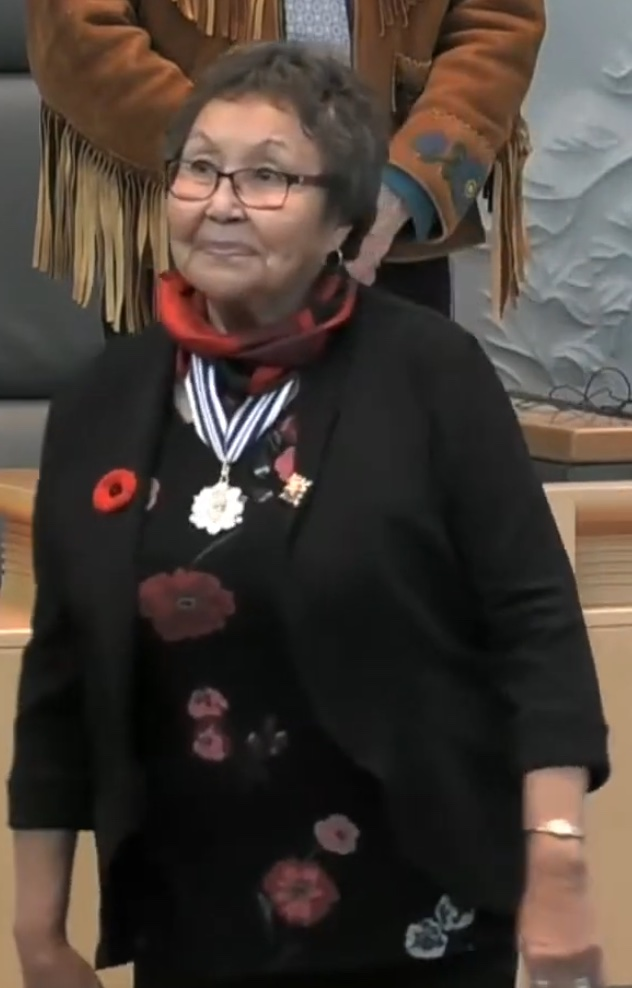
- Thom in 2019

Commissioner of the Northwest Territories
- In office September 18, 2017 – May 14, 2024
- Prime Minister: Justin Trudeau
- Premier: Bob McLeod; Caroline Cochrane; R.J. Simpson
- Preceded by: Gerald W. Kisoun (acting)
- Succeeded by: Gerald W. Kisoun

Personal details
- Born: 1951 (age 74–75) Fort Providence, Northwest Territories
- Spouse: Jim Thom
- Children: 4
- Occupation: Counsellor

Margaret M. Thom DStJ ONWT (born 1951) is a Canadian politician, who was the commissioner of the Northwest Territories. She previously served as the deputy commissioner of the Northwest Territories, Canada, from June 2, 2005, until October 2011. In June 2022 she was appointed to a second term.

Thom was born and raised in Fort Providence in an Indigenous family and worked a number of jobs before enrolling in a counselling program at Aurora College during the 1990s, subsequently becoming a counsellor at Deh Gáh School in Fort Providence.

Thom is a member of the NWT Education Hall of Fame and has been awarded the Territorial Wise Woman Award.

== Honours and Arms ==
Ribbon bars of Margaret Thom

Appointments

Country	Date	Appointment	Post-nominal letters
Canada	2012	Queen Elizabeth II Diamond Jubilee Medal	
Canada	2017	Dame of Justice of The Most Venerable Order of the Hospital of St. John of Jerusalem (Vice Prior of the Order in the Northwest Territories)	D.StJ
Northwest Territories	2017	Order of the Northwest Territories	ONWT
Canada	2024	King Charles III Coronation Medal	

=== Coat of arms ===
Thom was granted a coat of arms through Grant of Arms and Supporters, with differences to Tina Marie Gargan, Melanie Georgette Thom-Gargan, Lee Maria Thom and Tamara Rosalie Thom-Field, on May 15, 2019.

Coat of arms of Margaret Thom

Granted
2019
Crest
A bald eagle wings displayed Sable each charged with a mountain avens flower proper, its head Argent, beaked, legged and holding in the dexter claw a lightning flash Or, standing on a closed book bound Gules its edge fesswise Argent.
Escutcheon
Sable a tepee issuant from base Argent its staves Or its interior Gules charged with a campfire Or.
Supporters
Dexter a moose cow sinister a moose calf Or both supporting a braid of sweetgrass and standing on a grassy mount proper;
Motto
NEZŲ TS’ĘNDA
