= Mackenzie West =

Former territorial electoral district in the Northwest Territories, Canada

Mackenzie West is a former territorial electoral district, that elected Members to the Legislative Assembly of the Northwest Territories in Canada. The electoral district historically covered the communities of, Fort Liard, Fort Simpson, Fort Wrigley, Fort Norman, Fort Franklin, Norman Wells, Fort Good Hope, Arctic Red River, Aklavik, Reindeer Depot, and Tuktoyaktuk.

The electoral district was abolished on July 15, 1954.

== 1951 election ==
1951 Northwest Territories general election
Candidate	Votes	%
Frank Carmichael	407	58.14%
Vivian Roberts	190	27.14%
Karl Helmer Walter Gardlund	103	14.72%
Total valid ballots / Turnout	700	42.35%
Rejected ballots	11	
Source(s) Cloutier, Edmomd (1952). Report of the Chief Electoral Officer. Queen's Printer.

== See also ==
- List of Northwest Territories territorial electoral districts
- Canadian provincial electoral districts
