= Bill Berg (politician) =

Canadian politician

William Harvey Berg

Member of the Legislative Assembly of the Northwest Territories
- In office July 4, 1967 – October 1, 1967
- Preceded by: John Goodall
- Succeeded by: Mark Duane Fairbrother
- Constituency: Mackenzie River

Personal details
- Born: January 18, 1941
- Died: October 1, 1967 (aged 26) Little Dal Lake, Northwest Territories
- Party: Independent
- Occupation: policeman, game outfitter and politician

William Harvey Berg (January 18, 1941 – October 1, 1967) was a Royal Canadian Mounted policeman, game outfitter and a territorial level politician from Northwest Territories, Canada. He briefly served as a member of the Legislative Assembly of the Northwest Territories from July 4, 1967, until his death on October 1, 1967.

== Political career and death ==
Berg ran for a seat to the Northwest Territories Legislature in the 1967 Northwest Territories general election. He won the electoral district of Mackenzie River. Berg won the district easily over two other opponents, on election night he jumped out to a lead with over half the popular vote. The results of four polls however did not report for a number of days due to a communication blackout, leaving the Mackenzie River election in doubt along with the results in two other districts.

Berg died on October 1, 1967, in a plane crash into mountainous terrain near Little Dal Lake, Northwest Territories. Everyone on board the plane, 5 passengers and 1 crew member perished in the accident. The passengers were returning from a hunting trip. The Royal Canadian Air Force rescue team which found the wreckage of the Northern Mountain Air plane on October 5, 1967, found all the bodies on the aircraft were burned beyond recognition.

The Northwest Territories government named Mount Berg in his honour.
