= William Wallace Cory =

Canadian commissioner (1865-1943)

William Wallace Cory CMG
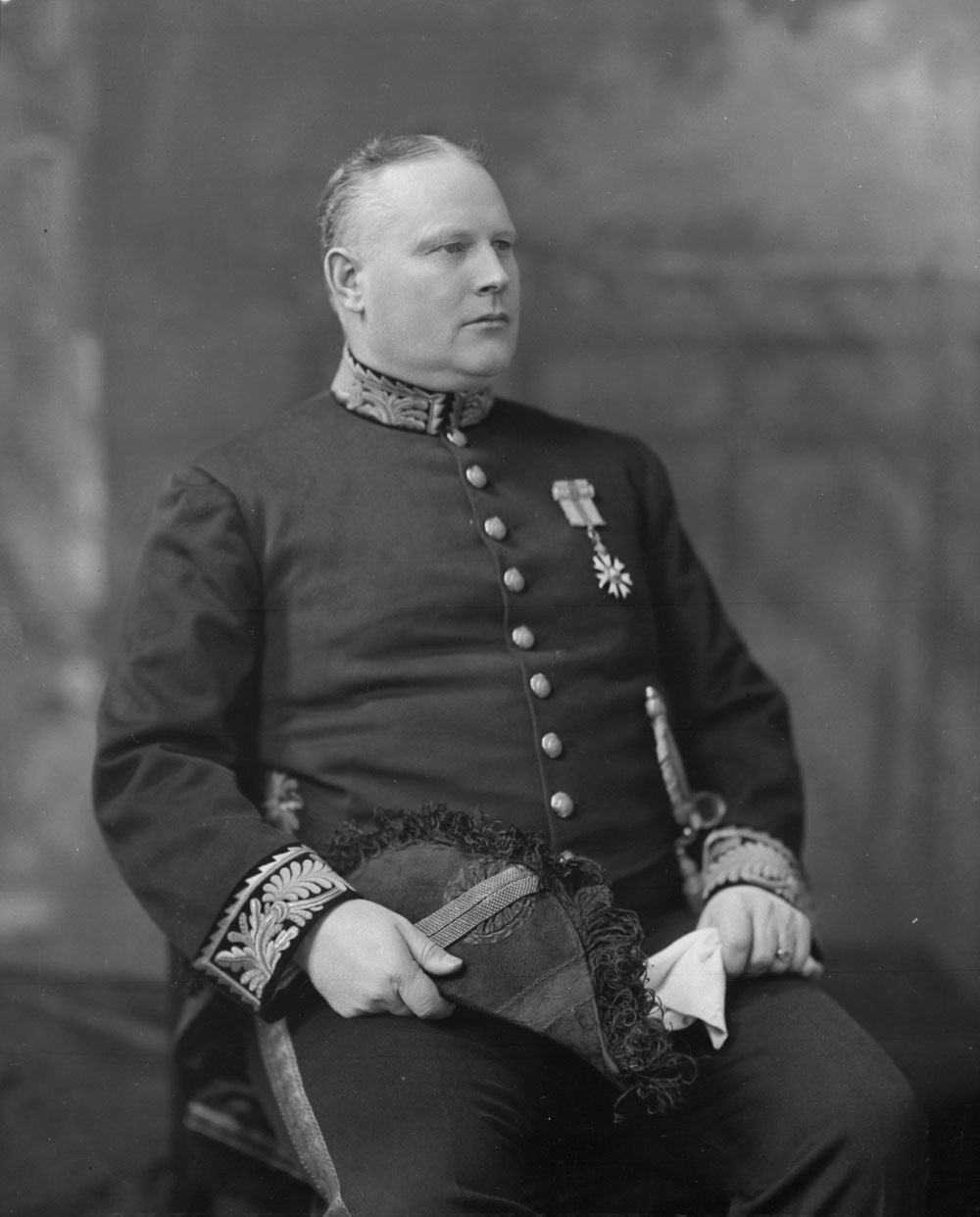

Commissioner of the Northwest Territories
- In office June 27, 1919 – February 17, 1931
- Preceded by: Frederick D. White
- Succeeded by: Hugh H. Rowatt

William Wallace Cory, CMG (June 16, 1865 – September 21, 1943) was the commissioner of the Northwest Territories from June 27, 1919 to February 17, 1931.

== Biography ==
Cory was born in Strathroy, Canada West and moved with his farming family to Gladstone, Manitoba in 1871. He studied law in Winnipeg and joined the Manitoba Attorney General's Office as a clerk in 1889, then joined the Dominion Department of the Interior in 1901. He was Assistant Commissioner of Dominion Lands from 1904 to 1905. Between 1905 and 1930 he was Deputy Minister of the Department of the Interior. He was appointed a Companion of the Order of St Michael and St George in 1909.

=== Commissioner of the Northwest Territories ===
In 1919 Cory was also appointed Commissioner of the Northwest Territories, holding the office until 1931. Only the second Commissioner of the Northwest Territories, Cory inherited a region that had barely been governed during the time of his predecessor. Within months the new Commissioner had enacted a new ordinance (or law) regarding entry into the Northwest Territories, restricting access only to those pre-approved by the Royal Canadian Mounted Police at various outposts in Alberta or the Yukon. The ordinance was cancelled a year later having been deemed ultra vires. However, during his tenure as Commissioner, Cory pursued further administration of the Territories, overseeing the appointment of councillors for the first time and establishing operations to facilitate the expansion of oil and gas interests in the region including the opening of the Territories' administration offices at Fort Smith in 1921.

Later in 1921, a memo from the Commissioner's office concerned the well-being of the 150 white settlers of the District of Mackenzie and including future white interests in the Territories. It did not make any reference to the interests of the approximately 3,500 aboriginal population of the District of Mackenzie at that time. However alternative evidence suggests Cory himself was sympathetic to the region's Inuit populace as highlighted in a letter to the Hudson's Bay Company secretary, Edward Fitzgerald accusing Hudson's Bay Company post managers of exploiting the Inuit, and casting doubt on whether the Company could reform its trading system to prevent such abuses.

=== Later life ===
Cory died in Montreal (St. Lambert) in 1943 and was buried in Ottawa.

Cory is the namesake of Mount Cory, in Alberta.

== Family ==
Cory married Laura Watson in 1888; they had three children: Wilfred, Thomas, and Edith. Edith married Alfred Bertram Rosevear and had eight children: John, William, Thomas, Margaret, Cory, Edith, Bertram, and Elizabeth. William married Cynthia and had a daughter named Stephanie. Cory married Elizabeth and had three children: Kenneth, Robin and Heather. Edith married J.D. Scanlan and had one daughter: Mary, who married Keith Martin and had three children: Sarah, Emily, and Sophie. Elizabeth married Charles Dean and had three children: Stephen, Thomas, and James.

== See also ==
- History of Northwest Territories
- History of Northwest Territories capital cities
