= James Brodie (Canadian politician) =

Canadian politician

James Brodie was a Canadian politician from the Northwest Territories. He was elected to the Northwest Territories Legislative Council in the 1951 Northwest Territories general election. He won the new electoral district of Mackenzie South defeating candidate Robert Poritt. He ran for re-election in the 1954 Northwest Territories general election against Poritt and was defeated.

Legislative Assembly of the Northwest Territories
Preceded by New District	MLA Mackenzie South; 1951–1954	Succeeded by Robert Poritt
