= Frederick D. White =

Canadian civil servant (1847-1918)

Lieutenant-Colonel Frederick D. White CMG
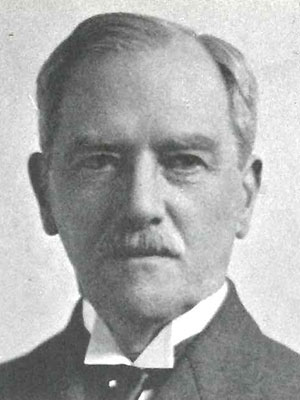

Commissioner of the Northwest Territories
- In office August 24, 1905 – September 27, 1918
- Preceded by: Office created
- Succeeded by: William Wallace Cory

Personal details
- Born: February 16, 1847 Birmingham, England
- Died: September 27, 1918 (aged 71) Ottawa, Ontario, Canada

Lieutenant-Colonel Frederick D. White CMG (February 16, 1847 – September 27, 1918) was a Canadian civil servant who served as the first commissioner of the Northwest Territories.

Born in Birmingham, White immigrated to British North America in 1862 at the age of 15, and worked for some time for the Grand Trunk Railway at Montreal. He entered the Canadian Department of Justice in 1869 as a third-class clerk, becoming Chief Clerk in 1876. He was later transferred to the Department of the Secretary of State, where he was made the clerk in charge of the North-West Mounted Police in 1876.

In 1880 he was appointed private secretary to Sir John A. Macdonald. The same year he was appointed Comptroller of the NWMP, holding the post until 1913. In 1883 he was given the rank of Deputy Minister (Secretary of State). In the 1902 Coronation Honours he was appointed a Companion of the Order of St Michael and St George.

On August 24, 1905, White was appointed the first Commissioner of the Northwest Territories, and held the office until his death on September 27, 1918.
