= Hugh Andrew Young =

Canadian military officer and civil servant (1898-1982)

Major-General Hugh Andrew Young CB DSO CBE (3 April 1898 – 21 January 1982) was a Canadian military officer and civil servant who served as the commissioner of the Northwest Territories from 1950 to 1953.

== Military career ==
Young was born in Winnipeg, Manitoba, to Andrew Young and Emma Florence Nesbitt, and was of Irish descent. He graduated from the University of Manitoba became joining the military, serving in the Yukon and Arctic. Once while facing starvation in the extreme north, he boiled and ate his Mukluks. During the First World War, he served with distinction with the Canadian Expeditionary Force.

In the Second World War, Young became a senior staff officer at the Canadian Military Headquarters in London. From 1942 to 1943, he commanded the 6th Canadian Infantry Brigade. From 1943 to 1944, he served on the general staff of II Canadian Corps, before returning to command of the 6th Brigade for the rest of the war. Following the end of the war, Young oversaw the return of Canadian forces to Canada and succeeded without any stray casualties. He was awarded the Distinguished Service Order in October 1944 and, by now a major general, appointed a Companion of the Order of the Bath (CB) over a year later in June 1946, a year after having been appointed a Commander of the Order of the British Empire (CBE).

Young retired from the army in 1947 and joined the Civil Service at the request of Prime Minister Louis St. Laurent.

He was Commissioner of the Northwest Territories from November 14, 1950, to November 15, 1953. He was Deputy Minister of Public Works for 10 years until 1963, serving under five different Ministers of Public Works.

He died in Ottawa in 1982.
