= Daniel Joseph Marion =

Commissioner Northwest Territories, Canada (1945–2022)

Commissioner of the Northwest Territories
- In office March 26, 1999 – March 31, 2000
- Prime Minister: Jean Chrétien
- Premier: Jim Antoine; Stephen Kakfwi
- Preceded by: Helen Maksagak
- Succeeded by: Glenna Hansen

Personal details
- Born: November 16, 1945 or December 6, 1945 St. Malo, Manitoba, Canada
- Died: May 12, 2022 (aged 76) Frank Channel, Northwest Territories, Canada
- Party: Independent

Daniel Joseph Marion (November 16, 1945 or December 6, 1945 – May 12, 2022) was the commissioner of the Northwest Territories from March 26, 1999, until March 31, 2000.

== Arms ==
Coat of arms of Daniel Joseph Marion

Notes
Granted 15 November 2006.
Crest
Four Tlicho tipis Gules the poles Argent in front of a demi-caribou Proper holding a sun in splendour Or.
Escutcheon
Argent a caribou’s head caboshed, the antlers enclosing three fleurs-de-lis Gules.
Supporters
Two narwhals Or rising from barry crested Azure and Argent on either side of a rock Proper.
Motto
Nurture Hope
