= Stu Hodgson =

Canadian politician, commissioner of the NWT

Commissioner of the Northwest Territories
- In office March 2, 1967 – April 6, 1979
- Preceded by: Bent Gestur Sivertz
- Succeeded by: John Havelock Parker

Personal details
- Born: Stuart Milton Hodgson; April 1, 1924 Vancouver, British Columbia, Canada
- Died: December 18, 2015 (aged 91) Vancouver, British Columbia, Canada
- Spouse(s): Pearl Kereliuk m. July 28, 1951

Stuart Milton Hodgson OC (April 1, 1924 – December 18, 2015) was the commissioner of the Northwest Territories (NWT) from March 2, 1967 until April 6, 1979.

== Early life ==
Hodgson was born in Vancouver, British Columbia, the second son of Allan and Mary Hodgson. In 1940, he began to work for the MacMillan lumber company, then left to join the Royal Canadian Navy between 1942 and 1945, where he took part in the Arctic convoys of World War II. For his service, he received the 1939–1945 Star, Atlantic Star and other World War II medals.

After his discharge from the military, Hodgson joined the International Woodworkers of America, served with his union local, and attended an International Labour Organization conference in Geneva as part of the Canadian Congress of Labour.

== Northwest Territories ==
In 1964, the Canadian federal government appointed Hodgson to the 5th Northwest Territories Legislative Council, and served as deputy commissioner from 1965-67. He then served as commissioner from 1967-79.

When rapid changes in socio-economic conditions threatened the continuity of Inuit oral history, Commissioner Hodgson urged the taping of elders' stories. In 1974, the residents of Pangnirtung (since then becoming part of Nunavut) presented the Commissioner with eleven stories which were later compiled into a book. Hodgson was nicknamed "Umingmak" by the Inuit.

Hodgson was one of the founders of the Arctic Winter Games - which began in Yellowknife in 1970 for athletes from Alaska, Yukon, and the NWT – and which now also include Greenland, parts of Arctic Russia, as well as Northern Alberta and Nunavik (Northern Quebec), and the new territory Nunavut which was formed from NWT in 1999.

The first Commissioner to actually reside in the Northwest Territories, he was a leader in the construction of a semiautonomous, responsible self-government run by residents of the territory.

== Later work and death ==
From 1979 to 1981, Hodgson was Canadian co-chairman of the U.S.-Canadian International Joint Commission. He was recruited by Premier William R. Bennett of British Columbia to run BC Ferries for a time in the 1980s.

He was appointed chairman and chief executive officer of the BC Transit in 1985, and appointed as a citizenship judge in British Columbia in December 1997 and served until 2005.

Hodgson died on December 18, 2015, aged 91.

== Honors ==
Hodgson was appointed as an Officer of the Order of Canada on December 18, 1970 for his service to labour and government. Subsequently he received the Queen's commemorative medals for her silver, golden, and the Queen Elizabeth II Diamond Jubilee Medal (2012); as well as the Canada 125 medal in 1992.

For his services in the NWT, he was presented the public service's Outstanding Achievement Award in 1976.

The Hodgson Trophy was created and awarded beginning in 1978 for fair play and team spirit during the Arctic Winter Games.
