= Duncan Pryde =

Canadian politician

Member of the Legislative Assembly of the Northwest Territories
- In office 1966–1970
- Succeeded by: Tom Butters
- Constituency: Central Arctic (1966–67); Western Arctic (1967–70)

Personal details
- Born: June 8, 1937 Dunbartonshire, Scotland
- Died: November 15, 1997 (aged 60) Isle of Wight
- Party: non-partisan consensus government
- Occupation: Hunter; trapper; lexicographer

Duncan McLean Pryde (June 8, 1937 – November 15, 1997) was a hunter, trapper, lexicographer and politician from Northwest Territories, Canada. He served as a member of the Northwest Territories Council from 1966 to 1975. His book based on his experiences, Nunaga (1971), has been reprinted several times.

== Early life ==
Duncan McLean Pryde was born on June 8, 1937, in Dunbartonshire, Scotland. He was raised in an orphanage along with four brothers and a sister. He joined the Merchant Navy at the age of 15 and eventually covered himself with tattoos. Pryde remained for three years in the Merchant Navy, then was forced to resign due to an eye injury, and went to work for Singer Corporation in the Clydebank sewing machine factory.

He left Singer at the age of 18 in 1955 after seeing an advertisement in The Sunday Post looking for traders to work for the Hudson's Bay Company in the Canadian North. After arriving in Canada, Pryde spent three years working in Ontario and Manitoba where he learned to speak the Cree language before transferring to the Northwest Territories.

After moving to the Arctic, determined to learn Inuktituk or Eskimo as it was then known, Pryde began writing his own dictionary after being given a poorly written dictionary by a Catholic Missionary. Pryde began adopting the way of life of the Inuit and learned the skills to live off the land. He became fluent in communication after three or four years. He also fathered a number of children with Inuit women.

== Political career ==
Pryde's political career began in 1966. The Northwest Territories opened up territorial elections for the first time in the Eastern Arctic after amendments to the Northwest Territories Act. Pryde was elected by Acclamation for a by-election held on September 19, 1966, in the new electoral district of Central Arctic.

Pryde was unable to make ends meet from the meager salary paid to members of the Council, a substantial pay decrease from the Hudson's Bay Company. While serving on Council he continued to live a nomadic Inuit lifestyle. Pryde ran for re-election a year later in the 1967 Northwest Territories general election. He ran in the electoral district of Western Arctic and won his second term in office.

== Publishings ==
Time magazine made Duncan Pryde internationally recognized by featuring him on the cover of the May 2, 1969, edition of the magazine. Later British journalist Cliff Michelmore filmed a feature about Pryde for British television in 1970. Pryde authored a book on his experience in the Northwest Territories which was first published in 1971. The book was titled Nunaga : Ten Years of Eskimo Life. The name of the book had a few variations and a translation was also published in a number of other languages including Dutch, French, Hungarian, Swedish and Danish. A second edition was published by Eland in 1985, incorporating material that was cut from the first printing.

Ed Ogle, the Calgary-based correspondent for Time magazine, was the man behind Duncan's initial publicity success. Ogle told Val Wake, a CBC News reporter based in Yellowknife, that he, Ogle, ghost wrote Pryde's non fiction work "Nunaga: Ten Years of Eskimo Life." Shortly after the book was published in 1972 rumours about Ogle's authorship circulated in Yellowknife. Ed Ogle accused Val Wake of revealing his secret. Val Wake maintained he never did.

During Val Wake's four-year stint in Yellowknife, 1969 to 1973, Duncan Pryde was a constant source of "good copy". He married a First Nations woman, Georgina Blondin in 1969. The book Nunaga is dedicated to Gina which was Duncan Pryde's pet name for her. The couple were guests for an official dinner when Queen Elizabeth visited Yellowknife in 1970. Georgina presented the Queen with an armful of white Arctic fox furs, a gift from the Northwest Territories Government. The couple divorced in 1975.

Before Duncan and Georgina became a couple, he had relationships with a number of Inuit women, by whom he had several children. In Yellowknife Duncan Pryde sometimes boasted about his Arctic children with the phrase: "every woman should have a bit of Pryde in them." Val Wake found these claims objectionable, especially as Duncan Pryde apparently did nothing to support his children. Wake's reporting of Pryde's activities as a member of the Territorial Council became less positive.

Pryde later moved to Alaska to work on his dictionary at the University of the Arctic. He had problems with Immigration and was forced to leave the United States until his residency issues were settled.

== Later life ==
After leaving Alaska, Pryde moved back to the United Kingdom and moved in with his brother in London. He had trouble adjusting away from northern life but never returned to the Arctic. Pryde met his second wife and moved to the Isle of Wight, setting up a newspaper shop called Pryde of Cowes and continuing work on his dictionary. He lived a quiet life and ended up losing touch with his United Kingdom family. Pryde died on November 15, 1997.

== Publications ==
- Nunaga: Ten Years Among the Eskimos: Eland Publishing Ltd (September 26, 2003) ISBN 978-0907871637
- Nunaga Ten years among the Eskimos, Duncan Pryde, Bantam Books, New York City, New York, February 1972, republished by Eland, 61 Exmouth Market, London EC1R 4QL in 1985 and 2003.
