= Yellowknife (administrative district) =

Former territorial electoral district in the Northwest Territories, Canada

The Yellowknife Administration district, was a political management jurisdiction representing Yellowknife, Northwest Territories, Canada.

The district was created by federal legislation in 1939 and was established on October 1 of that year to encompass lands within a 3.5-mile radius of the town centre, with a total area of 38.48 square miles (99.7 km^{2}). A Trustee Council was created to handle civic issues in Yellowknife. The issues included liquor control, sanitation, land surveys, schools, and taxation. The council was composed of three elected and three appointed trustees or three elected and four appointed (including the chairman) from a pool of local businessmen. According to one source, in 1948 it expanded to nine, with four more elected members, then contracted to three in 1950. This system continued until 1953 when the first fully elected Municipal Town Council was organized and Yellowknife civic affairs were no longer managed by the federal government.

== See also ==
- List of Northwest Territories territorial electoral districts
- Canadian provincial electoral districts
