= Lloyd Barber =

Canadian politician

Lloyd Ingram Barber
- Born: 8 March 1932; Regina, Saskatchewan
- Died: 16 September 2011 (aged 79); Regina Beach, Saskatchewan
- Education: University of Saskatchewan; University of California, Berkeley; University of Washington
- Known for: University of Regina leadership
- Awards: Order of Canada; Saskatchewan Order of Merit

Lloyd Ingram Barber, CC SOM (8 March 1932 – 16 September 2011) was the second President and former vice-chancellor of the University of Regina.

== Early life ==
Born in Regina, Saskatchewan, Barber earned a Bachelor of Arts degree at the University of Saskatchewan followed by an MBA from the University of California, Berkeley. He subsequently received his doctorate in business administration (PhD) from the University of Washington. He then joined the University of Saskatchewan where he taught commerce between 1955 and 1976, serving terms as dean of commerce and as vice-president.

== Political career ==
From 1964 to 1965 he was a member of the Saskatchewan Royal Commission on Government Administration.

Barber was appointed as a member of the Northwest Territorial Council on 9 November 1967, and his term lasted until 1970. He was the first Indian Claims Commissioner for Canada.

In 1976, Barber became the second president and vice-chancellor of the University of Regina, a position he held until retirement in 1990. He also supported the creation of the Saskatchewan Indian Federated College. From 1990 to 1993 he was chairman of the Saskatchewan Honours Advisory Council.

He was made an honorary Saskatchewan Indian chief in 1980 and received the Aboriginal Order of Canada in 1985.

He was a member of the Board of Directors of CanWest Global Communications Corp. and The Bank of Nova Scotia. He has also served as a Director of Cominco (today Teck Cominco) since 1987.

In 1978, he was named an Officer of the Order of Canada. In 1993, he was promoted to Companion of the Order of Canada. In 1995 he was invested as a member of the Saskatchewan Order of Merit, Saskatchewan's highest honour.
