= Bent Gestur Sivertz =

Canadian civil servant (1905–2000)

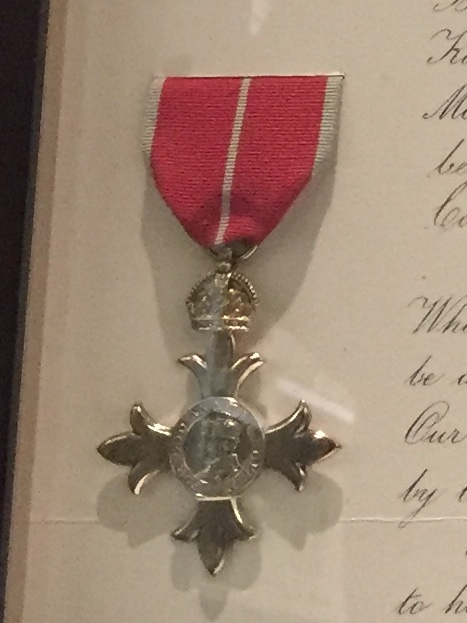
Bent Gestur Sivertz's Order of the British Empire Medal, University of King's College, Halifax, Nova Scotia

Bent Gestur Sivertz OBE (August 11, 1905 – October 4, 2000) was a Canadian sailor, teacher, soldier, and civil servant.

He was commissioner of the Northwest Territories from July 12, 1963 to January 16, 1967. He was the last non-resident Commissioner of the NWT.

Bent Gestur "Ben" Sivertz was born one of six brothers in Victoria, British Columbia, Canada. His parents were Icelandic immigrants and he and his brothers were raised in Victoria, B.C. where his father Christian was a longtime letter carrier and an early labour organizer in the post office. Bent was a merchant seaman and sailed in square-rigged ships for ten years on the B.C. coast and to Australia and New Zealand. He later crewed on tugboats such as the Moresby and Salvage King while taking teacher training at U.B.C. As an officer in the R.C.N.V.R., he was called up in 1940 for service with the Royal Canadian Navy and after instructing in navigation at several locations in Canada, in 1944 became commanding officer of HMCS Kings, as the Officer Training Establishment was then called. II.

After World War II, Bent Sivertz entered the Department of External Affairs where his success in reorganizing and streamlining the Passport Office to a point where passports were issued in three days rather than the previous three weeks, led to him being drafted in 1950 into the new Department of Resources and Development. Sivertz initiated a number of progressive and innovative policies in northern healthcare, education, infrastructure and corrections. His memoir recounts some of these activities and his struggles with Arthur Laing the then Minister of Northern Affairs. Sivertz became Commissioner of the Northwest Territories in 1963 and served until 1967. During the 1950s he was instrumental in introducing print making and cooperative marketing to the Cape Dorset Inuit.

"Today my tenure in Arctic Canada, and that of my colleagues is often referred to by the new breed of historians and politicians, as "assimilationist". They are quick to say that we were "well-intentioned, but misguided." I am told that I must not take personally the very personal attacks that have been leveled against me in the name of progress, but simply to understand that my notion of right and wrong was different from that of today. This has been a sadness for me and many of my northern peers who devoted themselves to Canada's North. In 1993, the Royal Commission on Aboriginal Peoples formalized this attack and destroyed many reputations, while turning history into a black and white affair, casting the white government employees as the 'bad guy', and the northern people, the Inui, [as] the exploited innocents. In spite of my difficulty with this Commission and my shabby treatment at its hands, my experiences in northern work have not been diminished where personal recollection is concerned."

Bent "Ben" Sivertz's oldest brother Henry George was a teacher until his enlistment in the Canadian Expeditionary Force. Henry was one of thirty-six Canadians awarded the Military Medal and two bars during World War I. He was killed in action in September 1918 at the (second) Battle of Cambrai. He is commemorated in the former Provincial Normal School (for teachers), of which he was a graduate, now part of Camosun College, Victoria, B.C. The next oldest brother Gustave "Gus" Sivertz also served in the C.E.F. and was later a well-known journalist in Vancouver where he wrote a periodic column called "Memoirs of an Old Sweat" about the War and veterans concerns. Christian "Chris" Sivertz, was also a teacher when he volunteered with his brothers in July 1916. All three brothers served in infantry battalions on the Western Front, Gus being wounded.

Bent Gestur Sivertz died on Mayne Island, BC in 2000. His wife, Barbara Isabel (née Prael) Sivertz predeceased him in Victoria, B.C. in 1995.
