= Roy A. Gibson =

Canadian politician

Roy Alexander Gibson (October 3, 1885 – August 14, 1953) was a civil servant and political figure in the Northwest Territories, Canada. He served as the deputy commissioner of the Northwest Territories from 1921 to 1950.

He was born in Brandon, Manitoba, the son of James Spence Gibson and Margaret Cynthia Mendell, and was educated in Brandon. Gibson was employed by a flour milling company, then was hired by the Department of the Interior in Regina in 1908, later serving as Assistant Deputy Minister, and worked for the Department of Mines and Resources from 1936 to 1947, serving as director of the Lands and Forests branch. He married Agnes Gertrude Hardcastle in 1931. After 1950, Gibson was a director in the Department of Resources and Development.
