= Bobby Porritt =

Canadian politician

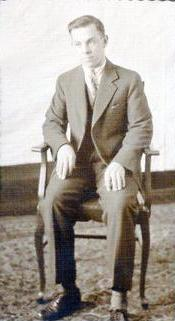
- Porritt in 1931
- Born: 1905; Leeds, England
- Died: 1984 (aged 78–79)
- Other names: Robert Porritt
- Known for: member of the Northwest Territories legislature

Bobby Porritt was a businessman, who lived almost his entire life in the Northwest Territories, who spent several terms as a member of the Northwest Territories legislature.

In February, 1940, Porritt's Fort Resolution Lumber Company received a contract to build a school in Yellowknife. The budget to construct the two-room schoolhouse was $4,500 CAD, and it was opened in November, 1940.

In February 1962 the Edmonton Journal quoted Porritt on the imminent completion of a railway line to Hay River, NWT. The projected completion of the route in 1964 would make Hay River the northernmost terminuses of the North American railgrid. He predicted the new terminuses would trigger a trebling of his city's population. The Edmonton Journal noted Porritt had represented the Mackenzie District in the legislature.

In the 1993 profile of the Dene people, Drum Songs, author Kerry Abel quoted Porritt as an example of a white legislator who called the Dene people "wards of the Canadian government", who hadn't learned to speak for themselves.
