= Louis Audette =

Canadian politician

Louis de la Chesnaye Audette
- Born: April 7, 1907; Ottawa, Ontario, Canada
- Died: April 2, 1995 (aged 87)
- Relatives: Andrew Stuart, grandfather
- Awards: Order of Canada

Louis de la Chesnaye Audette, OC (April 7, 1907 – April 2, 1995) was a Canadian lawyer, naval officer and civil servant.

Born in Ottawa, Ontario, the son of Louis-Arthur Audette and Mary-Grace Stuart, the tenth child of Andrew Stuart, he was educated as a lawyer and practiced in Montreal during the 1930s. During World War II, he served with the Royal Canadian Navy and commanded several ships (HMCS Pictou, Amherst, Coaticook, and St. Catharines) in the North Atlantic and Mediterranean. He was mentioned in dispatches and left the Navy with the rank of Lieutenant commander. As a reserve officer, he was later promoted to commander.

After the war, from 1947 to 1959, he a member of the Canadian Maritime Commission and its chairman from 1954 to 1959. From 1959 to 1972, he was Chairman of the Tariff Board of Canada.

In 1974, he was made an Officer of the Order of Canada. His oral history of his wartime adventures was published in Salty Dips Vol. 2 (1985.)
