= Mackenzie South =

Former territorial electoral district in the Northwest Territories, Canada

Mackenzie South is a former territorial electoral district, that elected members to the Northwest Territories Legislative Assembly in Canada. The electoral district covered the communities of Fort Smith, Hay River, Pine Point, Fort Resolution, Talston River, Snowdrift, Fort Reliance, and Wynn's Sawmill.

== 1954 election ==
1954 Northwest Territories general election
Name	Votes	%
Robert Porritt	519	68.02%
James Brodie	244	31.98%
Total Valid Ballots	763	100%
Voter Turnout 60.29%	Rejected Ballots 19	

== 1951 election ==
1951 Northwest Territories general election
Name	Votes	%
James Brodie	286	35.71%
Robert Porritt	200	24.97%
Maurice-René Danes	126	15.73%
Léo-Léandre Lirette	110	13.73%
Stanley Frederick Dean	79	9.86%
Total Valid Ballots	801	100%
Voter Turnout 69.91%	Rejected Ballots 10	

== See also ==
- List of Northwest Territories territorial electoral districts
- Canadian provincial electoral districts
