= Hugh Lester Campbell =

Canadian politician

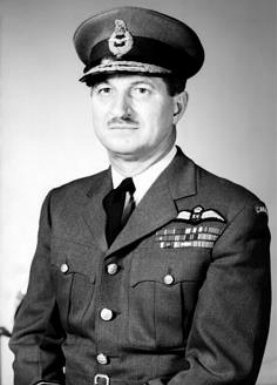
- Born: July 13, 1908; Salisbury, New Brunswick
- Died: May 25, 1987 (aged 78); Ottawa, Ontario
- Military career
- Allegiance: Canada
- Branch: Royal Canadian Air Force
- Service years: 1931–1962
- Rank: Air Marshal
- Commands: Canadian Air Division in Europe
- Conflicts: World War II
- Awards: Commander of the Order of the British Empire; Canadian Forces' Decoration

Air Marshal Hugh Lester Campbell, CBE, CD (July 13, 1908 – May 25, 1987) was a Canadian air marshal in the Royal Canadian Air Force and then a politician for Northwest Territories, Canada.

== Career ==
Educated at the University of New Brunswick, Campbell was commissioned into the Royal Canadian Air Force in 1931.

During World War II, Campbell served as the Director of Air Staff at the RCAF Overseas Headquarters. In his capacity as Director, on one occasion, Campbell was inspecting air force units in North Africa when his jeep drove over a mine and Campbell was wounded. Returning to Canada, in January 1944 Campbell was appointed as Assistant to the Chief of the Air Staff at the Royal Canadian Air Force Headquarters in Ottawa. The following April he became Air Member for Personal on promotion to air vice-marshal remaining at Ottawa.

In 1952 Campbell was appointed as the first Air Officer Commanding the Canadian Air Division in Europe. He retained this post until 1955 and during his years in command Canada's European commitment to NATO rose to 12 squadrons. From 1955 to 1957 he was the Vice Air Deputy at Supreme Headquarters Allied Powers Europe. He was appointed Chief of the Air Staff in 1957, holding the post until 1962 when he retired.

Following his service career Campbell entered politics. He served as a member of the Legislative Assembly of Northwest Territories being appointed to the council to serve as an at-large member three times from 1964 to 1975. He died in Ottawa on May 25, 1987.

Military offices
Preceded by C R Slemon	Chief of the Air Staff (RCAF); 1957 – 1962	Succeeded by C R Dunlap
