= Commissioner of the Northwest Territories =

Canadian officer

- Commissaire des Territoires du Nord-Ouest
- Badge of the Commissioner of the Northwest Territories

- Flag of the Commissioner of the Northwest Territories

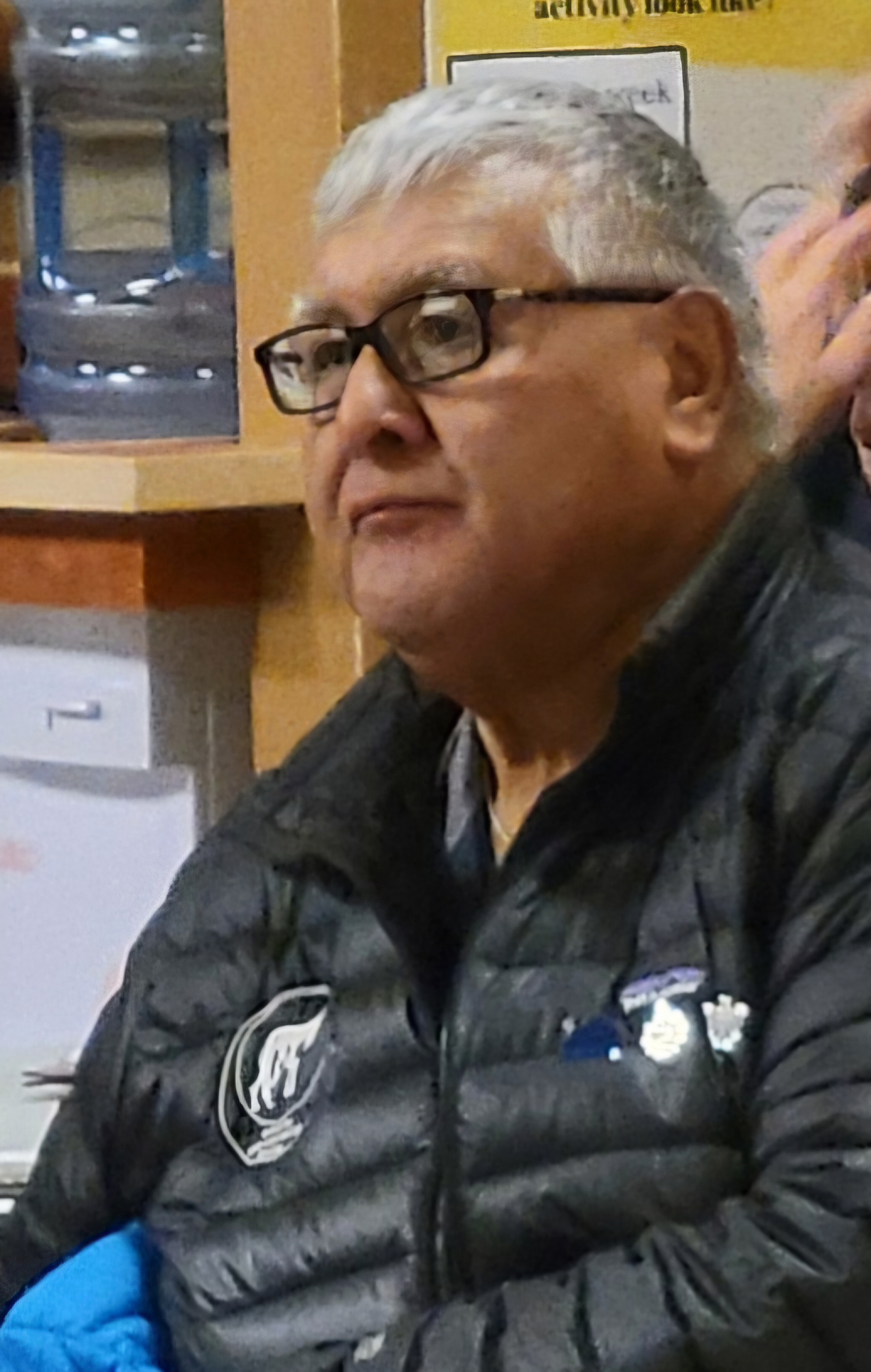
- Incumbent; Gerald Kisoun since 14 May 2024
- Style: Honourable
- Appointer: Governor-in-Council
- Formation: 24 August 1905
- First holder: Frederick D. White
- Website: www.commissioner.gov.nt.ca

The commissioner of the Northwest Territories (French: Commissaire des Territoires du Nord-Ouest) is the Government of Canada's representative in the Northwest Territories. Similar in certain functions to a lieutenant governor, the commissioner swears in the members of the legislative assembly, swears in members of the executive council, assents to bills, opens sessions of the legislative assembly, and signs other government documents such as Orders in Council.

Earlier commissioners were mostly deputy minister in various ministries. Initially, Commissioners had nearly absolute authority. However, over time, their powers were curtailed, and in 1967 the Carrothers report resulted in the creation of an elected Legislative Assembly.

In the 1970s, the Assembly gained more powers, and in 1980 responsible government was granted, with the Executive Council being accountable to the Legislative Assembly, fully adopting the Westminster system. The Northwest Territories is one of two jurisdictions with a nonpartisan consensus government system.

The introduction of responsible government resulted in the Commissioner's role becoming more akin to the Lieutenant Governor of a province—a politically aloof guarantor of the function of the parliamentary system akin to a head of state. However, commissioners remain appointed by the Government of Canada, and are not a vice-regal representative for the territory—the territories’ government is not an exercise of inherent sovereignty, but rather of devolution under the aegis of the federal Crown.

The commissioner represents the federal government and must follow any instructions of the Cabinet or the relevant federal minister, currently the Minister of Crown-Indigenous Relations and Northern Affairs. In practice, however, since 1980, the Commissioner has largely bowed to the decisions of the Legislative Assembly and Executive Council.

== Commissioners of the NWT ==
From	To	Name
24 August 1905	27 September 1918	Frederick D. White
27 September 1918	31 March 1931	William Wallace Cory
31 March 1931	1 May 1934	Hugh H. Rowatt
1 May 1934	3 December 1936	vacant (Roy A. Gibson acting)
3 December 1936	14 January 1947	Charles Camsell
14 January 1947	14 November 1950	Hugh Llewellyn Keenleyside
14 November 1950	15 November 1953	Hugh Andrew Young
15 November 1953	12 July 1963	Robert Gordon Robertson
12 July 1963	2 March 1967	Bent Gestur Sivertz
2 March 1967	15 April 1979	Stuart Milton Hodgson
15 April 1979	2 October 1989	John Havelock Parker
2 October 1989	16 January 1995	Daniel L. Norris
16 January 1995	26 March 1999	Helen Maksagak
26 March 1999	31 March 2000	Daniel Joseph Marion
31 March 2000	7 April 2005	Glenna Hansen
29 April 2005	28 May 2010	Tony Whitford
28 May 2010	10 May 2016	George Tuccaro
10 May 2016	18 September 2017	vacant (Gerald W. Kisoun acting)
18 September 2017	14 May 2024	Margaret M. Thom
14 May 2024	Incumbent	Gerald Kisoun

== See also ==
- Lieutenant-Governors of Northwest Territories (1869–1905)
