= Timeline of Canadian elections =

The timeline of elections in Canada covers all the provincial, territorial and federal elections from when each province was joined Confederation through to the present day. The table below indicates which party won the election. Several provinces held elections before joining Canada, but only their post-Confederation elections are shown. These include:

- Lower Canada held 15 elections for its Legislative Assembly, from 1792 to 1835;
- Upper Canada held 13 elections to its Legislative Assembly, from 1792 to 1836;
- the Province of Canada held 8 elections for its Legislative Assembly from 1841 to 1863;
- New Brunswick's first 21 elections, beginning in 1785 (the 21st Legislative Assembly of New Brunswick was elected in 1866, one year before Confederation, and continued until 1870, three years after Confederation);
- Nova Scotia's first 22 elections, beginning in 1758;
- Prince Edward Island's first 25 elections, beginning in 1773; and
- Newfoundland's first 29 elections, beginning in 1832.

The most recent election is shown with a box limited to four years of government, as the federal government and all provinces and territories have fixed election dates every four years. However, elections can be called at any time by an incumbent government. Thus, the box is shown as running until the next scheduled election, but one could still be earlier if the government falls due to a motion of no confidence, or if the governing party calls an early election. The maximum length of office as set by the constitution is five years.

== Legend ==
Abbreviation	Party
Pre	Pre-Confederation
BCL	British Columbia Liberal Party
LIB	Liberal Party
NDP	New Democratic Party
CCF	Co-operative Commonwealth Federation
ASC	Alberta Social Credit Party
UF	United Farmers
SK	Saskatchewan Party
BSC	British Columbia Social Credit Party
PQ	Parti Québécois
CON	Progressive Conservative Party or historical Conservatives
CPC	Conservative Party of Canada
CAQ	Coalition Avenir Québec
UN	Union Nationale
YU	Yukon Party
UCP	United Conservative Party
Co.	Coalition
N/A	Nonpartisan, and consensus government

== 1867–1897 ==
Year	BC	MB	ON	QC	NB	NS	PEI	NT	Federal
1867			1st Co. (Note: Coalition between Conservative and Liberal parties (who won 41 out of 82 seats each).)	1st CON	1st (Note: The first New Brunswick general election was held pre-Confederation and is not technically a Canadian election.)	1st LIB			1st CON
1868			1st Co.	1st CON	1st	1st LIB			1st CON
1869			1st Co.	1st CON	1st	1st LIB			1st CON
1870		1st N/A	1st Co.	1st CON	2nd N/A	1st LIB		(Temp. Council)	1st CON
1871	1st N/A	1st N/A	2nd LIB	2nd CON	2nd N/A	2nd LIB		(Temp. Council)	1st CON
1872	1st N/A	1st N/A	2nd LIB	2nd CON	2nd N/A	2nd LIB		(Temp. Council)	2nd CON
1873	1st N/A	1st N/A	2nd LIB	2nd CON	2nd N/A	2nd LIB	26th CON	(Temp. Council)	2nd CON
1874	1st N/A	2nd N/A	2nd LIB	2nd CON	3rd N/A	3rd LIB	26th CON	(Temp. Council)	3rd LIB
1875	2nd N/A	2nd N/A	3rd LIB	3rd CON	3rd N/A	3rd LIB	26th CON	(Temp. Council)	3rd LIB
1876	2nd N/A	2nd N/A	3rd LIB	3rd CON	3rd N/A	3rd LIB	27th CON	(First; Council)	3rd LIB
1877	2nd N/A	2nd N/A	3rd LIB	3rd CON	3rd N/A	3rd LIB	27th CON	(First; Council)	3rd LIB
1878	3rd	3rd	3rd LIB	4th LIB (Note: Power went back and forth a few times surrounding the 1878 election. For most of that legislature, the Liberals controlled a minority parliament with the support of some Conservative members.)	4th N/A	4th CON	27th CON	(First; Council)	4th CON
1879	3rd	4th CON	4th LIB	4th LIB	4th N/A	4th CON	28th CON	(First; Council)	4th CON
1880	3rd	4th CON	4th LIB	4th LIB	4th N/A	4th CON	28th CON	(First; Council)	4th CON
1881	3rd	4th CON	4th LIB	5th CON	4th N/A	4th CON	28th CON	(First; Council)	4th CON
1882	4th N/A	4th CON	4th LIB	5th CON	5th N/A	5th LIB	29th CON	(First; Council)	5th CON
1883	4th N/A	5th CON	5th LIB	5th CON	5th N/A	5th LIB	29th CON	(First; Council)	5th CON
1884	4th N/A	5th CON	5th LIB	5th CON	5th N/A	5th LIB	29th CON	(First; Council)	5th CON
1885	4th N/A	5th CON	5th LIB	5th CON	5th N/A	5th LIB	29th CON	(First; Council)	5th CON
1886	5th N/A	6th CON	6th LIB	6th LIB	6th N/A	6th LIB	30th CON	(First; Council)	5th CON
1887	5th N/A	6th CON	6th LIB	6th LIB	6th N/A	6th LIB	30th CON	(First; Council)	6th CON
1888	5th N/A	7th LIB	6th LIB	6th LIB	6th N/A	6th LIB	30th CON	1st N/A	6th CON
1889	5th N/A	7th LIB	6th LIB	6th LIB	6th N/A	6th LIB	30th CON	1st N/A	6th CON
1890	6th N/A	7th LIB	7th LIB	7th LIB	7th N/A	7th LIB	31st Co. (Note: Conservative and Liberal parties won 15 seats each (out of 30).)	1st N/A	6th CON
1891	6th N/A	7th LIB	7th LIB	7th LIB	7th N/A	7th LIB	31st Co.	2nd N/A	7th CON
1892	6th N/A	8th LIB	7th LIB	8th CON	8th N/A	7th LIB	31st Co.	2nd N/A	7th CON
1893	6th N/A	8th LIB	7th LIB	8th CON	8th N/A	7th LIB	32nd LIB	2nd N/A	7th CON
1894	7th N/A	8th LIB	8th LIB	8th CON	8th N/A	8th LIB	32nd LIB	3rd N/A	7th CON
1895	7th N/A	8th LIB	8th LIB	8th CON	9th N/A	8th LIB	32nd LIB	3rd N/A	7th CON
1896	7th N/A	9th LIB	8th LIB	8th CON	9th N/A	8th LIB	32nd LIB	3rd N/A	8th LIB
1897	7th N/A	9th LIB	8th LIB	9th LIB	9th N/A	9th LIB	33rd LIB	3rd N/A	8th LIB
Year	BC	MB	ON	QC	NB	NS	PEI	NT	Federal

== 1898–1948 ==
Year	BC	AB	SK	MB	ON	QC	NB	NS	PEI	YU	NT	Federal
	N/A			LIB	LIB	LIB	N/A	LIB	LIB		N/A	LIB
1898	8th N/A			LIB	9th LIB	LIB	N/A	LIB	LIB	N/A (Note: Although Yukon was created in 1898, the Territorial Council was wholly appointed from 1898 to 1900.)	4th N/A	LIB
1899	8th N/A			10th CON	9th LIB	LIB	10th N/A	LIB	LIB	N/A	4th N/A	LIB
1900	9th N/A			10th CON	9th LIB	10th LIB	10th N/A	LIB	34th LIB	1st N/A	4th N/A	9th LIB
1901	9th N/A			10th CON	9th LIB	10th LIB	10th N/A	10th LIB	34th LIB	1st N/A	4th N/A	9th LIB
1902	9th N/A			10th CON	10th LIB	10th LIB	10th N/A	10th LIB	34th LIB	1st N/A	5th CON	9th LIB
1903	10th CON			11th CON	10th LIB	10th LIB	11th N/A	10th LIB	34th LIB	2nd	5th CON	9th LIB
1904	10th CON			11th CON	10th LIB	11th LIB	11th N/A	10th LIB	35th LIB	2nd	5th CON	10th LIB
1905	10th CON	1st LIB	1st LIB	11th CON	11th CON	11th LIB	11th N/A	10th LIB	35th LIB	3rd N/A	(Second; Council)	10th LIB
1906	10th CON	1st LIB	1st LIB	11th CON	11th CON	11th LIB	11th N/A	11th LIB	35th LIB	3rd N/A	(Second; Council)	10th LIB
1907	11th CON	1st LIB	1st LIB	12th CON	11th CON	11th LIB	11th N/A	11th LIB	35th LIB	4th N/A	(Second; Council)	10th LIB
1908	11th CON	1st LIB	2nd LIB	12th CON	12th CON	12th LIB	12th N/A	11th LIB	36th LIB	4th N/A	(Second; Council)	11th LIB
1909	12th CON	2nd LIB	2nd LIB	12th CON	12th CON	12th LIB	12th N/A	11th LIB	36th LIB	5th N/A	(Second; Council)	11th LIB
1910	12th CON	2nd LIB	2nd LIB	13th CON	12th CON	12th LIB	12th N/A	11th LIB	36th LIB	5th N/A	(Second; Council)	11th LIB
1911	12th CON	2nd LIB	2nd LIB	13th CON	13th CON	12th LIB	12th N/A	12th LIB	36th LIB	5th N/A	(Second; Council)	12th CON
1912	13th CON	2nd LIB	3rd LIB	13th CON	13th CON	13th LIB	13th N/A	12th LIB	37th CON	6th N/A	(Second; Council)	12th CON
1913	13th CON	3rd LIB	3rd LIB	13th CON	13th CON	13th LIB	13th N/A	12th LIB	37th CON	6th N/A	(Second; Council)	12th CON
1914	13th CON	3rd LIB	3rd LIB	14th CON	14th CON	13th LIB	13th N/A	12th LIB	37th CON	6th N/A	(Second; Council)	12th CON
1915	13th CON	3rd LIB	3rd LIB	15th LIB	14th CON	13th LIB	13th N/A	12th LIB	38th CON	7th N/A	(Second; Council)	12th CON
1916	14th BCL	3rd LIB	3rd LIB	15th LIB	14th CON	14th LIB	13th N/A	13th LIB	38th CON	7th N/A	(Second; Council)	12th CON
1917	14th BCL	4th LIB	4th LIB	15th LIB	14th CON	14th LIB	14th N/A	13th LIB	38th CON	8th N/A	(Second; Council)	13th Co.
1918	14th BCL	4th LIB	4th LIB	15th LIB	14th CON	14th LIB	14th N/A	13th LIB	38th CON	8th N/A	(Second; Council)	13th Co.
1919	14th BCL	4th LIB	4th LIB	15th LIB	15th UF	15th LIB	14th N/A	13th LIB	39th LIB	8th N/A	(Second; Council)	13th Co.
1920	15th BCL	4th LIB	4th LIB	16th LIB	15th UF	15th LIB	15th N/A	14th LIB	39th LIB	9th N/A	(Second; Council)	13th Co.
1921	15th BCL	5th UF	5th LIB	16th LIB	15th UF	15th LIB	15th N/A	14th LIB	39th LIB	9th N/A	(Second; Council)	14th LIB
1922	15th BCL	5th UF	5th LIB	17th UF	15th UF	15th LIB	15th N/A	14th LIB	39th LIB	10th N/A	(Second; Council)	14th LIB
1923	15th BCL	5th UF	5th LIB	17th UF	16th CON	16th LIB	15th N/A	14th LIB	40th CON	10th N/A	(Second; Council)	14th LIB
1924	16th BCL	5th UF	5th LIB	17th UF	16th CON	16th LIB	15th N/A	14th LIB	40th CON	10th N/A	(Second; Council)	14th LIB
1925	16th BCL	5th UF	6th LIB	17th UF	16th CON	16th LIB	16th N/A	15th CON	40th CON	11th N/A	(Second; Council)	15th (Note: The Conservative party won the most seats, but the Liberal party maintained power with support from the Progressive party without forming an official coalition. Partway through the 15th Parliament the Conservative Party took control of government, but was not able to obtain the confidence of the House. See King–Byng Affair.)
1926	16th BCL	6th UF	6th LIB	17th UF	17th CON	16th LIB	16th N/A	15th CON	40th CON	11th N/A	(Second; Council)	16th LIB
1927	16th BCL	6th UF	6th LIB	18th UF	17th CON	17th LIB	16th N/A	15th CON	41st LIB	11th N/A	(Second; Council)	16th LIB
1928	17th CON	6th UF	6th LIB	18th UF	17th CON	17th LIB	16th N/A	16th CON	41st LIB	12th N/A	(Second; Council)	16th LIB
1929	17th CON	6th UF	7th Co. (Note: The Liberal party won the most seats, but lost a motion of no-confidence shortly after the election resulting in a coalition between the Conservative and Progressive parties.)	18th UF	18th CON	17th LIB	16th N/A	16th CON	41st LIB	12th N/A	(Second; Council)	16th LIB
1930	17th CON	7th UF	7th Co.	18th UF	18th CON	17th LIB	17th N/A	16th CON	41st LIB	12th N/A	(Second; Council)	17th CON
1931	17th CON	7th UF	7th Co.	18th UF	18th CON	18th LIB	17th N/A	16th CON	42nd CON	13th N/A	(Second; Council)	17th CON
1932	17th CON	7th UF	7th Co.	19th LIB	18th CON	18th LIB	17th N/A	16th CON	42nd CON	13th N/A	(Second; Council)	17th CON
1933	18th BCL	7th UF	7th Co.	19th LIB	18th CON	18th LIB	17th N/A	17th LIB	42nd CON	13th N/A	(Second; Council)	17th CON
1934	18th BCL	7th UF	8th LIB	19th LIB	19th LIB	18th LIB	17th N/A	17th LIB	42nd CON	14th N/A	(Second; Council)	17th CON
1935	18th BCL	8th ASC	8th LIB	19th LIB	19th LIB	19th LIB	18th LIB	17th LIB	43rd LIB	14th N/A	(Second; Council)	18th LIB
1936	18th BCL	8th ASC	8th LIB	20th LIB	19th LIB	20th UN	18th LIB	17th LIB	43rd LIB	14th N/A	(Second; Council)	18th LIB
1937	19th BCL	8th ASC	8th LIB	20th LIB	20th LIB	20th UN	18th LIB	18th LIB	43rd LIB	15th N/A	(Second; Council)	18th LIB
1938	19th BCL	8th ASC	9th LIB	20th LIB	20th LIB	20th UN	18th LIB	18th LIB	43rd LIB	15th N/A	(Second; Council)	18th LIB
1939	19th BCL	8th ASC	9th LIB	20th LIB	20th LIB	21st LIB	19th LIB	18th LIB	44th LIB	15th N/A	(Second; Council)	18th LIB
1940	19th BCL	9th ASC	9th LIB	20th LIB	20th LIB	21st LIB	19th LIB	18th LIB	44th LIB	16th N/A	(Second; Council)	19th LIB
1941	20th Co. (Note: Coalition between Liberal and Conservative parties.)	9th ASC	9th LIB	21st LIB	20th LIB	21st LIB	19th LIB	19th LIB	44th LIB	16th N/A	(Second; Council)	19th LIB
1942	20th Co.	9th ASC	9th LIB	21st LIB	20th LIB	21st LIB	19th LIB	19th LIB	44th LIB	16th N/A	(Second; Council)	19th LIB
1943	20th Co.	9th ASC	9th LIB	21st LIB	21st CON	21st LIB	19th LIB	19th LIB	45th LIB	16th N/A	(Second; Council)	19th LIB
1944	20th Co.	10th ASC	10th CCF	21st LIB	21st CON	22nd UN	20th LIB	19th LIB	45th LIB	17th N/A	(Second; Council)	19th LIB
1945	21st Co.	10th ASC	10th CCF	22nd LIB	22nd CON	22nd UN	20th LIB	20th LIB	45th LIB	17th N/A	(Second; Council)	20th LIB
1946	21st Co.	10th ASC	10th CCF	22nd LIB	22nd CON	22nd UN	20th LIB	20th LIB	45th LIB	17th N/A	(Second; Council)	20th LIB
1947	21st Co.	10th ASC	10th CCF	22nd LIB	22nd CON	22nd UN	20th LIB	20th LIB	46th LIB	18th N/A	(Second; Council)	20th LIB
1948	21st Co.	11th ASC	11th CCF	22nd LIB	23rd CON	23rd UN	21st LIB	20th LIB	46th LIB	18th N/A	(Second; Council)	20th LIB
Year	BC	AB	SK	MB	ON	QC	NB	NS	PEI	YU	NT	Federal

== 1949–1998 ==
Newfoundland (now Newfoundland and Labrador) joined Canada as a new province in 1949.

Year	BC	AB	SK	MB	ON	QC	NB	NS	PEI	NF	YU	NT	Federal
	Co.	ASC	CCF	LIB	CON	UN	LIB	LIB	LIB		N/A	N/A	LIB
1949	22nd Co.	ASC	CCF	23rd LIB	CON	UN	LIB	21st LIB	LIB	30th LIB	19th N/A	N/A	21st LIB
1950	22nd Co.	ASC	CCF	23rd LIB	CON	UN	LIB	21st LIB	LIB	30th LIB	19th N/A	N/A	21st LIB
1951	22nd Co.	ASC	CCF	23rd LIB	24th CON	UN	LIB	21st LIB	47th LIB	31st LIB	19th N/A	6th N/A	21st LIB
1952	23rd BSC	12th ASC	12th CCF	23rd LIB	24th CON	24th UN	22nd CON	21st LIB	47th LIB	31st LIB	20th N/A	6th N/A	21st LIB
1953	24th BSC	12th ASC	12th CCF	24th LIB	24th CON	24th UN	22nd CON	22nd LIB	47th LIB	31st LIB	20th N/A	6th N/A	22nd LIB
1954	24th BSC	12th ASC	12th CCF	24th LIB	24th CON	24th UN	22nd CON	22nd LIB	47th LIB	31st LIB	20th N/A	7th N/A	22nd LIB
1955	24th BSC	13th ASC	12th CCF	24th LIB	25th CON	24th UN	22nd CON	22nd LIB	48th LIB	31st LIB	21st N/A	7th N/A	22nd LIB
1956	25th BSC	13th ASC	13th CCF	24th LIB	25th CON	25th UN	23rd CON	23rd CON	48th LIB	32nd LIB	21st N/A	7th N/A	22nd LIB
1957	25th BSC	13th ASC	13th CCF	24th LIB	25th CON	25th UN	23rd CON	23rd CON	48th LIB	32nd LIB	21st N/A	8th N/A	23rd CON
1958	25th BSC	13th ASC	13th CCF	25th CON	25th CON	25th UN	23rd CON	23rd CON	48th LIB	32nd LIB	22nd N/A	8th N/A	24th CON
1959	25th BSC	14th ASC	13th CCF	26th CON	26th CON	25th UN	23rd CON	23rd CON	49th CON	33rd LIB	22nd N/A	8th N/A	24th CON
1960	26th BSC	14th ASC	14th CCF	26th CON	26th CON	26th LIB	24th LIB	24th CON	49th CON	33rd LIB	22nd N/A	9th N/A	24th CON
1961	26th BSC	14th ASC	14th CCF	26th CON	26th CON	26th LIB	24th LIB	24th CON	49th CON	33rd LIB	23rd N/A	9th N/A	24th CON
1962	26th BSC	14th ASC	14th CCF	27th CON	26th CON	27th LIB	24th LIB	24th CON	50th CON	34th LIB	23rd N/A	9th N/A	25th CON
1963	27th BSC	15th ASC	14th CCF	27th CON	27th CON	27th LIB	25th LIB	25th CON	50th CON	34th LIB	23rd N/A	9th N/A	26th LIB
1964	27th BSC	15th ASC	15th LIB	27th CON	27th CON	27th LIB	25th LIB	25th CON	50th CON	34th LIB	24th N/A	10th	26th LIB
1965	27th BSC	15th ASC	15th LIB	27th CON	27th CON	27th LIB	25th LIB	25th CON	50th CON	34th LIB	24th N/A	10th	27th LIB
1966	28th BSC	15th ASC	15th LIB	28th CON	27th CON	28th UN	25th LIB	25th CON	51st LIB	35th LIB	24th N/A	10th	27th LIB
1967	28th BSC	16th ASC	16th LIB	28th CON	28th CON	28th UN	26th LIB	26th CON	51st LIB	35th LIB	25th N/A	11th N/A	27th LIB
1968	28th BSC	16th ASC	16th LIB	28th CON	28th CON	28th UN	26th LIB	26th CON	51st LIB	35th LIB	25th N/A	11th N/A	28th LIB
1969	29th BSC	16th ASC	16th LIB	29th NDP	28th CON	28th UN	26th LIB	26th CON	51st LIB	35th LIB	25th N/A	11th N/A	28th LIB
1970	29th BSC	16th ASC	16th LIB	29th NDP	28th CON	29th LIB	27th CON	27th LIB	52nd LIB	35th LIB	26th N/A	12th N/A	28th LIB
1971	29th BSC	17th CON	17th NDP	29th NDP	29th CON	29th LIB	27th CON	27th LIB	52nd LIB	36th CON	26th N/A	12th N/A	28th LIB
1972	30th NDP	17th CON	17th NDP	29th NDP	29th CON	29th LIB	27th CON	27th LIB	52nd LIB	37th CON	26th N/A	12th N/A	29th LIB
1973	30th NDP	17th CON	17th NDP	30th NDP	29th CON	30th LIB	27th CON	27th LIB	52nd LIB	37th CON	26th N/A	12th N/A	29th LIB
1974	30th NDP	17th CON	17th NDP	30th NDP	29th CON	30th LIB	28th CON	28th LIB	53rd LIB	37th CON	27th N/A	12th N/A	30th LIB
1975	31st BSC	18th CON	18th NDP	30th NDP	30th CON	30th LIB	28th CON	28th LIB	53rd LIB	38th CON	27th N/A	13th N/A	30th LIB
1976	31st BSC	18th CON	18th NDP	30th NDP	30th CON	31st PQ	28th CON	28th LIB	53rd LIB	38th CON	27th N/A	13th N/A	30th LIB
1977	31st BSC	18th CON	18th NDP	31st CON	31st CON	31st PQ	28th CON	28th LIB	53rd LIB	38th CON	27th N/A	13th N/A	30th LIB
1978	31st BSC	18th CON	19th NDP	31st CON	31st CON	31st PQ	29th CON	29th CON	54th LIB	38th CON	28th CON	13th N/A	30th LIB
1979	32nd BSC	19th CON	19th NDP	31st CON	31st CON	31st PQ	29th CON	29th CON	55th CON	39th CON	28th CON	14th N/A	31st CON
1980	32nd BSC	19th CON	19th NDP	31st CON	31st CON	31st PQ	29th CON	29th CON	55th CON	39th CON	28th CON	14th N/A	32nd LIB
1981	32nd BSC	19th CON	19th NDP	32nd NDP	32nd CON	32nd PQ	29th CON	30th CON	55th CON	39th CON	28th CON	14th N/A	32nd LIB
1982	32nd BSC	20th CON	20th CON	32nd NDP	32nd CON	32nd PQ	30th CON	30th CON	56th CON	40th CON	29th CON	14th N/A	32nd LIB
1983	33rd BSC	20th CON	20th CON	32nd NDP	32nd CON	32nd PQ	30th CON	30th CON	56th CON	40th CON	29th CON	15th N/A	32nd LIB
1984	33rd BSC	20th CON	20th CON	32nd NDP	32nd CON	32nd PQ	30th CON	31st CON	56th CON	40th CON	29th CON	15th N/A	33rd CON
1985	33rd BSC	20th CON	20th CON	32nd NDP	33rd LIB	33rd LIB	30th CON	31st CON	56th CON	41st CON	30th NDP	15th N/A	33rd CON
1986	34th BSC	21st CON	21st CON	33rd NDP	33rd LIB	33rd LIB	30th CON	31st CON	57th LIB	41st CON	30th NDP	15th N/A	33rd CON
1987	34th BSC	21st CON	21st CON	33rd NDP	34th LIB	33rd LIB	31st LIB	31st CON	57th LIB	41st CON	30th NDP	16th N/A	33rd CON
1988	34th BSC	21st CON	21st CON	34th CON	34th LIB	33rd LIB	31st LIB	32nd CON	57th LIB	41st CON	30th NDP	16th N/A	34th CON
1989	34th BSC	22nd CON	21st CON	34th CON	34th LIB	34th LIB	31st LIB	32nd CON	58th LIB	42nd LIB	31st NDP	16th N/A	34th CON
1990	34th BSC	22nd CON	21st CON	35th CON	35th NDP	34th LIB	31st LIB	32nd CON	58th LIB	42nd LIB	31st NDP	16th N/A	34th CON
1991	35th NDP	22nd CON	22nd NDP	35th CON	35th NDP	34th LIB	32nd LIB	32nd CON	58th LIB	42nd LIB	31st NDP	17th N/A	34th CON
1992	35th NDP	22nd CON	22nd NDP	35th CON	35th NDP	34th LIB	32nd LIB	32nd CON	58th LIB	42nd LIB	32nd YU	17th N/A	34th CON
1993	35th NDP	23rd CON	22nd NDP	35th CON	35th NDP	34th LIB	32nd LIB	33rd LIB	59th LIB	43rd LIB	32nd YU	17th N/A	35th LIB
1994	35th NDP	23rd CON	22nd NDP	35th CON	35th NDP	35th PQ	32nd LIB	33rd LIB	59th LIB	43rd LIB	32nd YU	17th N/A	35th LIB
1995	35th NDP	23rd CON	23rd NDP	36th CON	36th CON	35th PQ	33rd LIB	33rd LIB	59th LIB	43rd LIB	32nd YU	18th N/A	35th LIB
1996	36th NDP	23rd CON	23rd NDP	36th CON	36th CON	35th PQ	33rd LIB	33rd LIB	60th CON	44th LIB	33rd NDP	18th N/A	35th LIB
1997	36th NDP	24th CON	23rd NDP	36th CON	36th CON	35th PQ	33rd LIB	33rd LIB	60th CON	44th LIB	33rd NDP	18th N/A	36th LIB
1998	36th NDP	24th CON	23rd NDP	36th CON	36th CON	36th PQ	33rd LIB	34th LIB	60th CON	44th LIB	33rd NDP	18th N/A	36th LIB
Year	BC	AB	SK	MB	ON	QC	NB	NS	PEI	NF	YU	NT	Federal

== 1999–present ==
The territory of Nunavut was created on 1 April 1999, from land previously part of the Northwest Territories.

Year	BC	AB	SK	MB	ON	QC	NB	NS	PEI	NL	YU	NT	NU	Federal
	NDP	CON	NDP	CON	CON	PQ	LIB	LIB	CON	LIB	NDP	N/A		LIB
1999	NDP	CON	24th Co. (Note: Coalition between NDP and Liberal Party.)	37th NDP	37th CON	PQ	34th CON	35th CON	CON	45th LIB	NDP	19th N/A	1st N/A	LIB
2000	NDP	CON	24th Co.	37th NDP	37th CON	PQ	34th CON	35th CON	61st CON	45th LIB	34th LIB	19th N/A	1st N/A	37th LIB
2001	37th BCL	25th CON	24th Co.	37th NDP	37th CON	PQ	34th CON	35th CON	61st CON	45th LIB	34th LIB	19th N/A	1st N/A	37th LIB
2002	37th BCL	25th CON	24th Co.	37th NDP	37th CON	PQ	34th CON	35th CON	61st CON	45th LIB	35th YU	19th N/A	1st N/A	37th LIB
2003	37th BCL	25th CON	25th NDP	38th NDP	38th LIB	37th LIB	35th CON	36th CON	62nd CON	46th CON	35th YU	20th N/A	1st N/A	37th LIB
2004	37th BCL	26th CON	25th NDP	38th NDP	38th LIB	37th LIB	35th CON	36th CON	62nd CON	46th CON	35th YU	20th N/A	2nd N/A	38th LIB
2005	38th BCL	26th CON	25th NDP	38th NDP	38th LIB	37th LIB	35th CON	36th CON	62nd CON	46th CON	35th YU	20th N/A	2nd N/A	38th LIB
2006	38th BCL	26th CON	25th NDP	38th NDP	38th LIB	37th LIB	36th LIB	37th CON	62nd CON	46th CON	36th YU	20th N/A	2nd N/A	39th CPC
2007	38th BCL	26th CON	26th SK	39th NDP	39th LIB	38th LIB	36th LIB	37th CON	63rd LIB	47th CON	36th YU	21st N/A	2nd N/A	39th CPC
2008	38th BCL	27th CON	26th SK	39th NDP	39th LIB	39th LIB	36th LIB	37th CON	63rd LIB	47th CON	36th YU	21st N/A	3rd N/A	40th CPC
2009	39th BCL	27th CON	26th SK	39th NDP	39th LIB	39th LIB	36th LIB	38th NDP	63rd LIB	47th CON	36th YU	21st N/A	3rd N/A	40th CPC
2010	39th BCL	27th CON	26th SK	39th NDP	39th LIB	39th LIB	37th CON	38th NDP	63rd LIB	47th CON	36th YU	21st N/A	3rd N/A	40th CPC
2011	39th BCL	27th CON	27th SK	40th NDP	40th LIB	39th LIB	37th CON	38th NDP	64th LIB	48th CON	37th YU	22nd N/A	3rd N/A	41st CPC
2012	39th BCL	28th CON	27th SK	40th NDP	40th LIB	40th PQ	37th CON	38th NDP	64th LIB	48th CON	37th YU	22nd N/A	3rd N/A	41st CPC
2013	40th BCL	28th CON	27th SK	40th NDP	40th LIB	40th PQ	37th CON	39th LIB	64th LIB	48th CON	37th YU	22nd N/A	4th N/A	41st CPC
2014	40th BCL	28th CON	27th SK	40th NDP	41st LIB	41st LIB	38th LIB	39th LIB	64th LIB	48th CON	37th YU	22nd N/A	4th N/A	41st CPC
2015	40th BCL	29th NDP	27th SK	40th NDP	41st LIB	41st LIB	38th LIB	39th LIB	65th LIB	49th LIB	37th YU	23rd N/A	4th N/A	42nd LIB
2016	40th BCL	29th NDP	28th SK	41st CON	41st LIB	41st LIB	38th LIB	39th LIB	65th LIB	49th LIB	38th LIB	23rd N/A	4th N/A	42nd LIB
2017	41st NDP	29th NDP	28th SK	41st CON	41st LIB	41st LIB	38th LIB	40th LIB	65th LIB	49th LIB	38th LIB	23rd N/A	5th N/A	42nd LIB
2018	41st NDP	29th NDP	28th SK	41st CON	42nd CON	42nd CAQ	39th CON	40th LIB	65th LIB	49th LIB	38th LIB	23rd N/A	5th N/A	42nd LIB
2019	41st NDP	30th UCP	28th SK	42nd CON	42nd CON	42nd CAQ	39th CON	40th LIB	66th CON	50th LIB	38th LIB	24th N/A	5th N/A	43rd LIB
2020	42nd NDP	30th UCP	29th SK	42nd CON	42nd CON	42nd CAQ	40th CON	40th LIB	66th CON	50th LIB	38th LIB	24th N/A	5th N/A	43rd LIB
2021	42nd NDP	30th UCP	29th SK	42nd CON	42nd CON	42nd CAQ	40th CON	41st CON	66th CON	51st LIB	39th LIB	24th N/A	6th N/A	44th LIB
2022	42nd NDP	30th UCP	29th SK	42nd CON	43rd CON	43rd CAQ	40th CON	41st CON	66th CON	51st LIB	39th LIB	24th N/A	6th N/A	44th LIB
2023	42nd NDP	31st UCP	29th SK	43rd NDP	43rd CON	43rd CAQ	40th CON	41st CON	67th CON	51st LIB	39th LIB	25th N/A	6th N/A	44th LIB
2024	43rd NDP	31st UCP	30th SK	43rd NDP	43rd CON	43rd CAQ	41st LIB	42nd CON	67th CON	51st LIB	39th LIB	25th N/A	6th N/A	44th LIB
2025	43rd NDP	31st UCP	30th SK	43rd NDP	44th CON	43rd CAQ	41st LIB	42nd CON	67th CON	52nd CON	40th YU	25th N/A	7th N/A	45th LIB
2026	44th CON	31st UCP	30th SK	43rd NDP	44th CON	44th PQ	41st LIB	42nd CON	67th CON	52nd CON	40th YU	25th N/A	7th N/A	45th LIB
2027	44th CON	next	30th SK	next	44th CON	44th PQ	41st LIB	42nd CON	next	52nd CON	40th YU	next	7th N/A	45th LIB
2028	44th CON		next		44th CON	44th PQ	next	42nd CON		52nd CON	40th YU		7th N/A	45th LIB
2029	44th CON				44th CON	44th PQ		next		next	next		next	next
2030	next				next	next
Year	BC	AB	SK	MB	ON	QC	NB	NS	PEI	NL	YU	NT	NU	Federal

== Summary ==
The table below shows how many elections each party has won in each province and territory. The Northwest Territories and Nunavut use consensus government, which means there are no political parties. Of forty-five federal elections, twenty-six have been won by the Liberals, eighteen by the Conservatives, and one by a now defunct Unionist party.

Party	BC	AB	SK	MB	ON	QC	NB	NS	PEI	NL	YU	NT	NU	Total
Liberal	9	4	10	11	17	25	13	25	23	13	3	0	0	153
(Progressive) Conservative	6	14	2	18	24	5	11	16	18	10	2	1	0	127
Non-partisan	9	0	0	3	0	0	16 (Note: Although the 1st NB election is shown in the main table, it took place a year before NB joined Confederation. As such it was not a Canadian election, and is thus excluded from this table.)	0	0	0	27	23	7	85
New Democratic	6	1	6	9	1	0	0	1	0	0	3	0	0	27
Social Credit	11	9	0	0	0	0	0	0	0	0	0	0	0	20
Coalition	3	0	2	0	1	0	0	0	1	0	0	0	0	7
United Farmers	0	3	0	2	1	0	0	0	0	0	0	0	0	6
Union Nationale	-	-	-	-	-	6	-	-	-	-	-	-	-	6
Parti Québécois	-	-	-	-	-	6	-	-	-	-	-	-	-	6
Co. Commonwealth Fed.	-	-	5	-	-	-	-	-	-	-	-	-	-	5
Saskatchewan Party	-	-	5	-	-	-	-	-	-	-	-	-	-	5
Yukon Party	-	-	-	-	-	-	-	-	-	-	5	-	-	5
Coalition Avenir Québec	-	-	-	-	-	2	-	-	-	-	-	-	-	2
Total	44	31	30	43	44	44	40	42	42	23	40	24	7	454

== See also ==
- List of Canadian federal general elections
- Canadian electoral calendar
- List of elections in the Province of Canada (pre-Confederation)
- List of federal by-elections in Canada
