= List of post-Confederation New Brunswick general elections =

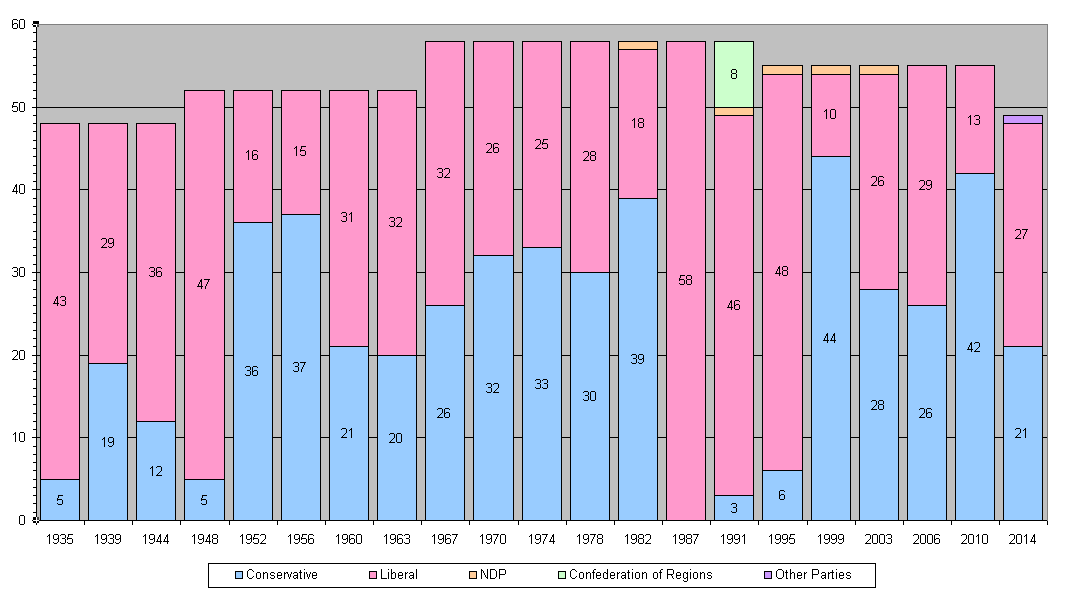
Number of seats won by major parties at each election: Conservative/PC; Liberal; NDP; Confederation of Regions; Other Parties

This article provides a summary of results for the general elections to the Canadian province of New Brunswick's unicameral legislative body, the Legislative Assembly of New Brunswick. Prior to 1892, New Brunswick had a bicameral legislature, but its Upper House – the Legislative Council – was not elected. The number of seats has varied over time – from 41 at the time of Canadian Confederation, to a high of fifty-eight from 1967 through 1991, to the level of 55 since the 1995 election. Changing again in 2013 to 49 seats at which it remains today.

Beginning with the 37th New Brunswick general election in 2010, elections in New Brunswick are – in general – held on fixed dates on the fourth Monday of September every four years. The date may be varied by one week earlier or later in cases of the fourth Monday of September being a date of cultural or religious significance and may be varied one month earlier or later in cases of a federal election being held during the same period. The Lieutenant Governor of New Brunswick also has the power to call an election on another date in the event of a loss of confidence in the legislature.

The chart on the upper right shows the information graphically, with the most recent elections towards the right. It shows that New Brunswick has effectively a two-party system – the Liberals (red) and the Conservatives (blue); along with the one-off success of the Confederation of Regions party (green) in 1991. It also shows the Liberal party's clean sweep of seats in 1987, one of the few instances in history when a party won all the seats in a national or sub-national legislature. Since provincial parties were officially recognized, the Liberal party have won eleven out of twenty elections.

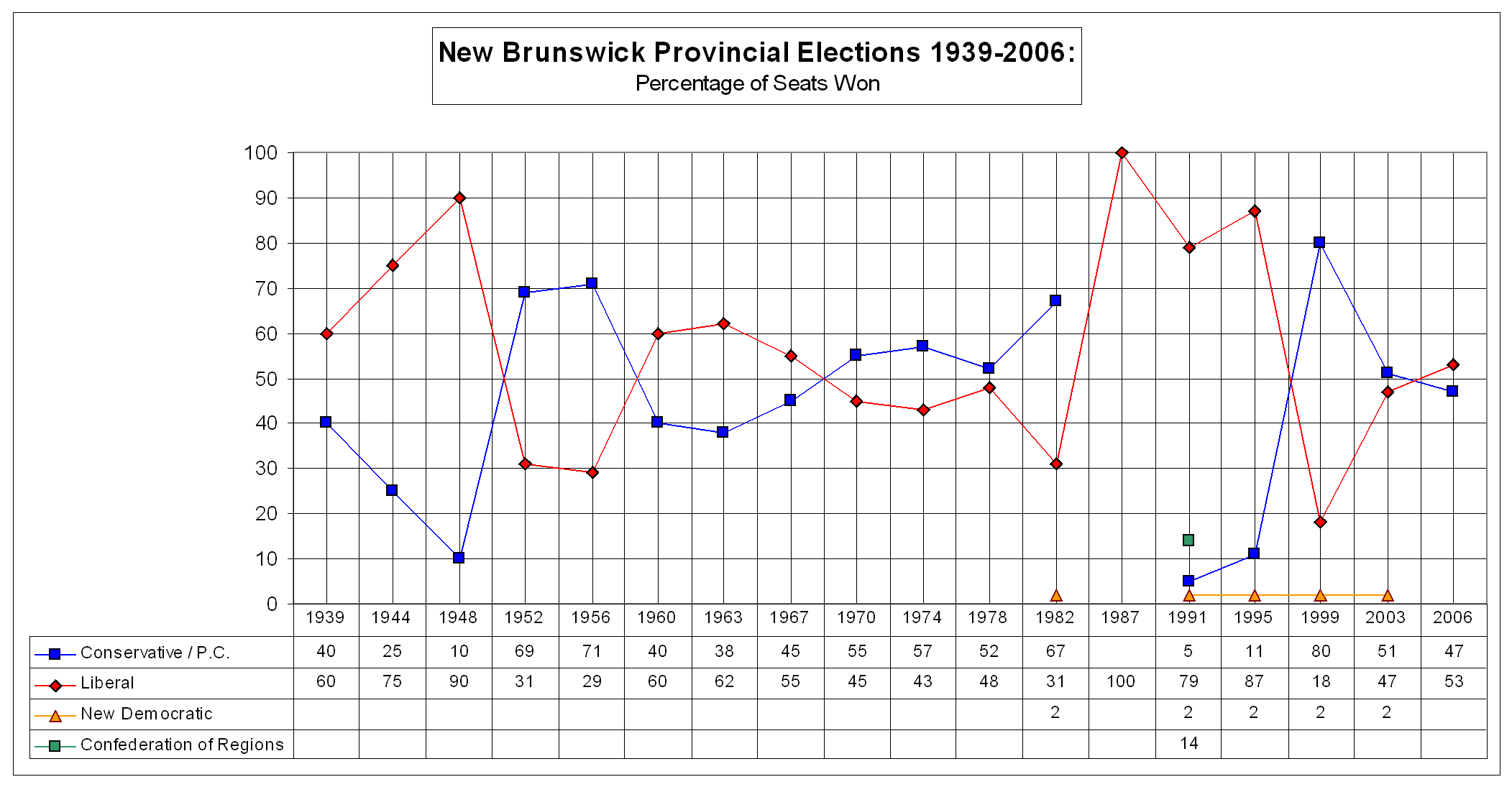
Electoral results by parties as a percentage of total Legislative Assembly seats from 1939 to 2006.

This article only covers elections since the province became part of the Canadian Confederation in 1867. Prior to becoming part of Canada, New Brunswick was a British colony; the New Brunswick House of Assembly was first formed in 1784 – when New Brunswick separated from Nova Scotia.

Percentage of votes obtained by political party since 1960.

== 1866–1934 ==
New Brunswick joined the Canadian Confederation in 1867. Between 1917 and 1935, party lines had developed but were not recognized by electoral law. Before this, only "Government" and "Opposition" were used. The results are listed below.

Election		Total seats	Government	Opposition	Other Parties
1st	May–June 1866	41	33 (Confederationist)	8 (Constitutionalist)
2nd	June–July 1870	41	24 (coalition)	16	Neutral 1
3rd	May–June 1874	41	35	5	Neutral 1
4th	June 1878	41	31	10
5th	June 1882	41	22	18 (Liberal)	Neutral 1
6th	April 26, 1886	41	33 (Liberal)	8 (Conservative)
7th	January 20, 1890	41	26 (Liberal)	15 (Conservative)
8th	October 1892	41	25 (Liberal)	12 (Conservative)	Neutral 4
9th	October 1895	46	34 (Liberal)	9 (Conservative)	Neutral 3
10th	February 18, 1899	46	40 (Liberal)	4 (Conservative)	Neutral 2
11th	February 28, 1903	46	33 (Liberal)	10 (Conservative)	Neutral 3
12th	March 3, 1908	46	31 (Conservative)	12 (Liberal)	Neutral 2
13th	June 20, 1912	48	44 (Conservative)	2 (Liberal)	Neutral 2
14th	February 24, 1917	48	27 (Liberal)	21 (Conservative)
15th	October 9, 1920	48	24 (Liberal)	13 (Conservative)	Opposition (United Farmers) 9 Opposition (Farmer-Labour) 2
16th	August 10, 1925	48	37 (Conservative)	11 (Liberal)
17th	June 19, 1930	48	31 (Conservative)	17 (Liberal)

== 1935–present ==
Between 1935 and the 1974 provincial election, some ridings were multi-member seats – i.e., more than one member of the Legislative Assembly was elected from certain ridings. Political parties were officially recognized and registered beginning in 1935. Since 1974, each riding (electoral district) has elected only one member to the Legislative Assembly of New Brunswick.

Election		Total seats	PC^{[A]}	Liberal	Green	NDP	Other Parties
18th	June 27, 1935	48	5	43
19th	November 20, 1939	48	19	29
20th	August 28, 1944	48	12	36
21st	June 28, 1948	52	5	47
22nd	September 22, 1952	52	36	16
23rd	June 18, 1956	52	37	15
24th	June 27, 1960	52	21	31
25th	April 22, 1963	52	20	32
26th	October 13, 1967	58	26	32
27th	October 26, 1970	58	32	26
28th	November 18, 1974	58	33	25
29th	October 23, 1978	58	30	28
30th	October 12, 1982	58	39	18		1
31st	October 13, 1987	58	0	58
32nd	September 23, 1991	58	3	46		1	8 (Confederation of Regions^{[B]})
33rd	September 11, 1995	55	6	48		1
34th	June 7, 1999	55	44	10		1
35th	June 9, 2003	55	28	26		1
36th	September 18, 2006	55	26	29
37th	September 27, 2010	55	42	13
38th	September 22, 2014	49	21	27	1
39th	September 24, 2018	49	22	21	3		3 (People's Alliance)
40th	September 14, 2020	49	27	17	3		2 (People's Alliance)
41st	October 21, 2024	49	16	31	2

=== Notes ===
^{A} Includes results for Progressive Conservatives.
^{B} The Confederation of Regions Party only contested the 1991, 1995 and 1999 elections.

== See also ==
- Timeline of Canadian elections
- General elections in New Brunswick (pre-Confederation)
- List of political parties in New Brunswick

== Bibliography ==
- "New Brunswick Votes 2006". CBC.ca. (results back to 1956)
- Doyle, Arthur T. (1984). Elections in New Brunswick, 1784-1984. Fredericton: Brunswick Press. ISBN 0-88838-391-6.
