= Minority governments in Canada =

In Canada's parliamentary system of responsible government, minority governments occur when no party has a majority of seats in the legislature. Typically, but not necessarily, the party with a plurality of seats forms the government. In a minority situation, governments must rely on the support of other parties to stay in power, so they are less stable than a majority government.

Canadian political parties rarely form official coalition governments to form a majority. But it has happened, such as Manitoba in 1941.

Canada's plurality voting system means that minority governments are relatively rare in comparison with countries that have a proportional representation voting system. However, minority governments have become more common at the federal level. Since 2004, six out of eight governments formed have been minority governments at the federal level. Nine of Canada's 10 provinces, all but Alberta, have experienced minority governments as well, mostly produced by first-past-the-post elections.

== Federal level ==
Canada has had 16 minority governments, experiencing its longest period of minority government with three successive minority governments elected in 2004, 2006 and 2008. It happened again with three successive minority governments elected in 2019, 2021 and 2025.

- Alexander Mackenzie (1873–1874, Liberal)
- William Lyon Mackenzie King (1921–1925, 1925–1926, 1926–1930, Liberal)
- Arthur Meighen (1926, Conservative)
- John Diefenbaker (1957–1958, 1962–1963, Progressive Conservative)
- Lester Pearson (1963–1965, 1965–1968, Liberal)
- Pierre Trudeau (1972–1974, Liberal)
- Joe Clark (1979–1980, Progressive Conservative)
- Paul Martin (2004–2006, Liberal)
- Stephen Harper (2006–2008, 2008–2011, Conservative)
- Justin Trudeau (2019–2021, 2021–2025, Liberal)
- Mark Carney (2025–2026, Liberal)

== Provincial and territorial level ==
Of Canada's 10 provinces, only Alberta has never had a minority government. The territories of Northwest Territories and Nunavut do not have political parties and are instead governed under the consensus government system.

In cases where one party does not have a majority of the seats, a coalition government may be formed through an ad hoc merger of two or more caucuses. Such was the case in Manitoba in 1941 when a wartime coalition made up of Conservatives, CCF and Social Credit was formed and (mostly) did not run candidates against each other in the election that year, winning majority government as a coalition and governing as a coalition thereafter.

- British Columbia (1924–1928, 1952–1953, 2017–2020)
- Manitoba (1920–1922, 1936–1941, 1958–1959, 1969–1973, 1988–1990)
- New Brunswick (1920–1925, 2018–2020)
- Newfoundland and Labrador (1971–1972, 2019–2021)
- Nova Scotia (1970–1974, 1998–1999, 2003–2006, 2006–2009)
- Ontario (1867–1871, 1943–1945, 1975–1977, 1977–1981, 1985–1987, 2011–2014)
- Prince Edward Island (1873–1876, 1876–1879, 1890–1893, 2019–2020)
- Quebec (1878–1879, 2007–2008, 2012–2014, 2026–present)
- Saskatchewan (1929–1934, 1999–2003)
- Yukon (1985–1989, 1992–1996, 2021-2025)
