= 1st New Brunswick general election =

The 1st New Brunswick general election may refer to:

- 1785 New Brunswick general election, the 1st general election to take place in the Colony of New Brunswick, for the 1st New Brunswick Legislative Assembly
- 1866 New Brunswick general election, the 21st general election to take place in the Colony of New Brunswick, for the 21st New Brunswick Legislative Assembly, but considered the 1st general election for the Canadian province of New Brunswick
- 1870 New Brunswick general election, the 1st general election after New Brunswick joined Canadian Confederation, for the 22nd New Brunswick Legislative Assembly
