= 35th New Brunswick general election =

The 35th New Brunswick general election may refer to

- the 1920 New Brunswick general election, the 35th overall general election for New Brunswick, for the 35th New Brunswick Legislative Assembly, but considered the 15th general election for the Canadian province of New Brunswick, or
- the 2003 New Brunswick general election, the 55th overall general election for New Brunswick, for the 55th New Brunswick Legislative Assembly, but considered the 35th general election for the Canadian province of New Brunswick.
