= 33rd New Brunswick general election =

The 33rd New Brunswick general election may refer to

- the 1912 New Brunswick general election, the 33rd overall general election for New Brunswick, for the 33rd New Brunswick Legislative Assembly, but considered the 13th general election for the Canadian province of New Brunswick, or
- the 1995 New Brunswick general election, the 53rd overall general election for New Brunswick, for the 53rd New Brunswick Legislative Assembly, but considered the 33rd general election for the Canadian province of New Brunswick.
