= 22nd New Brunswick general election =

22nd New Brunswick general election may refer to:

- 1870 New Brunswick general election, the 22nd overall general election for New Brunswick, for the 22nd New Brunswick Legislative Assembly, but considered the 2nd general election for the Canadian province of New Brunswick
- 1952 New Brunswick general election, the 42nd overall general election for New Brunswick, for the 42nd New Brunswick Legislative Assembly, but considered the 22nd general election for the Canadian province of New Brunswick
