= 32nd New Brunswick general election =

The 32nd New Brunswick general election may refer to

- the 1908 New Brunswick general election, the 32nd overall general election for New Brunswick, for the 32nd New Brunswick Legislative Assembly, but considered the 12th general election for the Canadian province of New Brunswick, or
- the 1991 New Brunswick general election, the 52nd overall general election for New Brunswick, for the 52nd New Brunswick Legislative Assembly, but considered the 32nd general election for the Canadian province of New Brunswick.
