= Elections Ontario =

Canadian provincial elections organization

- Élections Ontario

Office overview
- Jurisdiction: Provincial Elections in Ontario
- Headquarters: 26 Prince Andrew Place, Toronto, Ontario
- Employees: 81,792 (general election period)
- Office executive: Greg Essensa, Chief Electoral Officer
- Website: www.elections.on.ca

Elections Ontario (French: Élections Ontario) is an independent office of the Legislative Assembly of Ontario responsible for the administration of provincial elections and referendums. It is charged with the implementation and enforcement of the Election Act (R.S.O., c. E.6), Election Finances Act (R.S.O. 1990, c. E.7), Representation Acts (various), as well as specific portions of the Municipal Elections Act, 1996 (S.O. 1996, c. 32, Sched.), Taxpayer Protection Act, 1999 (S.O. 1999, c. 7, Sched. A), and Fluoridation Act (R.S.O. 1990, c. F.22). The agency collects information about political parties, candidates, constituency associations, leadership contestants, and third parties involved in Ontario politics. Elections Ontario is led by the Chief Electoral Officer, a non-partisan Officer of the Legislative Assembly chosen by an all-party committee. Greg Essensa, appointed in 2008, is the current Chief Electoral Officer. His predecessor was John Hollins, who held the position from 2001 to 2008.

== Mandate ==
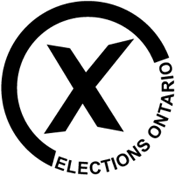
Former logo of Elections Ontario

Its responsibilities include:

- Administering the election process in general elections and by-elections
- Maintaining the Permanent Register of Electors for Ontario (PREO)
- Testing new voting equipment, vote-counting equipment and alternative voting methods
- Conducting public education on the electoral process
- Overseeing the registration of political parties, constituency associations, candidates, leadership contestants and third party advertisers
- Publishing on the Internet financial statements of the people and entities governed by the Act, including the real time disclosure of political contributions
- Reviewing financial statements to ensure compliance
- Distributing publicly funded subsidies
- Investigating and reporting apparent contraventions
- Recommending reforms to the Election Act and Election Finances Act.

== 2012 Privacy Breach ==
In July 2012, Chief Electoral Officer Greg Essensa announced the April disappearance of two USB flash drives holding data on 2.4 million voters in 25 Ontario ridings. The data included the names, gender, birth date and address of voters. The two staff members who lost the drives no longer work at Elections Ontario. The Ontario Provincial Police and the Information and Privacy Commissioner of Ontario started investigations into the privacy breach described as "the largest in Ontario history". Merchant Law Group filed a class action suit with the Ontario Superior Court of Justice on July 20, 2012. Information and Privacy Commissioner Ann Cavoukian issued a report with recommendations on the incident on July 31, 2012.

== Notable investigations ==
=== 2015 Sudbury by-election bribery investigation ===
On February 19, 2015, Chief Electoral Officer Greg Essensa delivered a report to the Ontario legislature alleging that Premier Kathleen Wynne's chief-of-staff Patricia Sorbara and Sudbury riding organizer Gerry Lougheed Jr. had offered a job to Andrew Olivier, who intended to run to be the Liberal candidate in the by-election. Ontario Provincial Police investigated the allegations and laid two charges against Lougheed. Police did not lay charges against Sorbara.

=== 2018 Highway 407 data theft investigation ===
The Globe and Mail reported on May 20, 2018, that Elections Ontario had launched an investigation in response to a complaint that Progressive Conservative Party of Ontario candidates allegedly used data stolen from the 407 ETR toll highway to further party nomination campaigns in several ridings. The complaint, filed by the Ontario New Democratic Party, focused on the nomination contests in the ridings of Brampton West, Brampton Centre, Brampton South, Burlington, Mississauga East—Cooksville, Mississauga—Erin Mills, Mississauga—Lakeshore, Mississauga—Streetsville, Oakville, Beaches—East York, Milton and Hamilton West—Ancaster—Dundas. The Hamilton West—Ancaster—Dundas nomination is also the subject of a separate criminal investigation by the Hamilton Police Service.

== See also ==
- Politics of Ontario
- List of political parties in Ontario
