= Minor party =

Political party with little influence in politics

A minor party or fringe party, also known in two-party systems as a third party, is a political party that plays a smaller (in some cases much smaller, even insignificant in comparison) role than a major party in a country's politics and elections. The difference between minor and major parties can be so great that the membership total, donations, and the candidates that they are able to produce or attract are very distinct. Some of the minor parties play almost no role in a country's politics because of their low recognition, vote and donations. Minor parties often receive very small numbers of votes at an election (to the point of losing any candidate nomination deposit). The method of voting can also assist or hinder a minor party's chances. For example, in an election for more than one member, the proportional representation method of voting can be advantageous to a minor party as can preference allocation from one or both of the major parties.

A minor party that follows the direction/directive of some other major parties is called a bloc party or satellite party.

== Frequency ==
Countries using proportional representation give little advantage to the two largest parties, so they tend to elect many parties. Therefore, in those countries, three, four, or more political parties are usually elected to legislatures. In such parliamentary systems, coalitions often include smaller parties; since they may participate in a coalition government, there is not a sharp distinction with a 'major' party. In two-party systems, on the other hand, only the major parties have a serious chance of forming a government. Similarly, in presidential systems, third-party candidates are rarely elected president.

In some countries like the United States, small parties face structural barriers to electoral success. These include as exclusion from major debates, little media coverage, denial of ballot access as well as hamstrung campaign budgets.

== Purpose ==
Minor parties usually have little chance of forming a government or winning the position of head of government. Nevertheless, there are many reasons for third parties to compete. The opportunity of a national election means that attention will be paid to their positions and platforms. The larger parties might be forced to respond and adapt to their challengers, and often the larger parties copy ideas from them.

In the Westminster system there is also the possibility of minority governments, which can give smaller parties strength disproportional to their support. Examples include the Irish Parliamentary Party which pushed for Home Rule in Ireland in the late 19th century.

Challenging parties also usually appeal for votes on the basis that they will try to change the voting system to make it more competitive for all parties.

== Australia ==
Minor parties in Australia owe much of their success to the proportional representation method of voting for the Australian Senate and one chamber of the legislatures of most states. This allows minor parties to achieve at least one quota in the electorate or state and thus gain representation in a parliamentary chamber. Often minor parties have been so successful in gaining such representation that they are able to hold the balance of power in the particular house of the parliament. Some examples are the Democratic Labor Party (DLP) in the 1960s and early 1970s, the Australian Democrats from the late 1970s until 2004, and more recently the Australian Greens.

== Canada ==
In Canada, the Liberal Party and the Conservative Party are the two major parties at the federal level. The Bloc Québécois (BQ), New Democratic Party (NDP), and Green Party are the largest minor parties, represented in the House of Commons of Canada. The BQ and NDP have often held the balance of power during periods of minority governments.

Another 12 parties are registered with Elections Canada, but have no seats in Parliament.

== Germany ==
Germany uses a form of proportional representation for its federal elections, with a threshold of 5% to qualify for seats, or alternatively 3 direct mandates. Thus, there are many minor parties which regularly fail to reach the 5% mark federally. These include the Free Voters, Die PARTEI, the National Democratic Party of Germany and the Human Environment Animal Protection Party.

== Indonesia ==
Minor political parties are commonly referred to as partai gurem (gurem being the Indonesian term for a type of mite) in Indonesia. In Indonesia's first democratic election in 1955, over a dozen newly established political parties which participated in elections won just two seats or less in the House of Representatives. During most of Suharto's presidency, only three political parties participated in elections, but after Suharto's fall minor parties returned to the Indonesian electoral scene. In the 1999 election, for example, out of 48 participating political parties only 20 political parties won any seats at the national level. Since the 2009 election, a parliamentary threshold has been implemented in Indonesian elections, reducing the number of parties represented in the national parliament to ten or less.

== United Kingdom ==
The use of first-past-the-post voting in the United Kingdom means that in the post-War era, only two parties have had a majority in parliament: the Conservative Party and the Labour Party. However, strong regionalist movements and the potential for parties to take votes in the centre or extreme fringes of the political spectrum mean that minor parties still play a significant and increasing role in British politics.

The Liberal Democrats, and their predecessors the SDP–Liberal Alliance and the Liberal Party (the main opposition to the Conservative Party before the rise of Labour, forming governments six times between 1859 and 1918) have achieved significant numbers of seats and have occasionally been kingmakers (such as during the Lib–Lab pacts and the 2010–2015 coalition with the Conservatives) and are sometimes also classed as a major party. The nationalist Scottish National Party and Plaid Cymru hold a significant number of seats in their Home Nations, with the SNP controlling 56 of 59 Scottish Westminster seats at the 2015 general election, and every single Northern Irish seat is held by a regional party – either the republican Sinn Féin and Social Democratic and Labour Party, or the unionist Ulster Unionist Party and Democratic Unionist Party.

In the 2015 general election, UKIP won 12.6% of the popular vote, though only one seat. UKIP fared better in European elections, and from 2014 to 2019, was the largest British party in the European Parliament. UKIP was de facto succeeded by the Brexit Party, which also had great success in European Parliament before Brexit went into effect. The Brexit Party subsequently renamed itself Reform UK, which went on to win 14.3% of the vote and 5 seats in the 2024 general election. Since 2010, the Green Party of England and Wales has won at least one seat in the House of Commons and in 2026 they achieved their first seat in the Senedd. Their sister party the Scottish Greens have had representation in the Scottish Parliament since its inception.

Other parties that have held seats in devolved assemblies, the House of Commons or the European Parliament in the 21st century include the non-sectarian Northern Irish Alliance Party, the far right British National Party, the healthcare-focused Independent Community & Health Concern, the cross-community Northern Irish NI21, the cross-community feminist Northern Ireland Women's Coalition, the anti-austerity People Before Profit Alliance, the left-wing Northern Irish unionist Progressive Unionist Party, the left wing Respect Party, the left wing nationalist Scottish Socialist Party, the elderly interest Scottish Senior Citizens Unity Party and the unionist Northern Irish Traditional Unionist Voice and UK Unionist Party.

Whether or not a party counts as a major party is a sometimes heated argument, since "major parties" as defined by Ofcom are entitled to more party political broadcasts than minor ones. Because of the regionalist nature of many parties, it is possible to be a major party in one part of the country and not another: for example, at one point UKIP was officially a major party in England and Wales, but a minor one in Scotland. No mainland British party is classed as a major party in Northern Ireland.

A minor party is also a special type of political party registered with the Electoral Commission in Great Britain that is able to contest only parish and community council elections in England and Wales and has fewer reporting, financial and administrative requirements than an ordinary registered political party.

== United States ==
In the United States, minor parties are often described as third parties. Minor parties in the U.S. include the Libertarian Party, the Green Party, Constitution Party, and others that have less influence than the major parties. Since the American Civil War (1861–1865), the major parties have been the Republican Party and the Democratic Party. Since 1860, six presidential candidates other than Republicans and Democrats have received over 10% of the popular vote, although one of them was a former president, Theodore Roosevelt.

Third-party presidential candidates, 1832–1996
Third-party candidates who received more than the historical average of 5.6 percent of the popular vote or at least one electoral college vote are listed below, three of which were former presidents (follow links for more information on their time as president).
Year	Candidate		Popular vote %	Electoral votes	Outcome in next election
1996	Reform	Ross Perot	8.4	0	Did not run; endorsed Republican candidate George W. Bush
1992	Independent	Ross Perot	**18.9**	0	Ran as Reform Party candidate
1980	Independent	John B. Anderson	6.6	0	Did not run
1972	Libertarian	John Hospers	0.0	1 (faithless elector)	Did not run; his elector Roger MacBride was instead the Libertarian candidate.
1968	American Independent	George Wallace	**13.5**	46	1972 Candidate John G. Schmitz Won 1.4 percent of the popular vote (slightly over one million votes). Wallace was shot while running for the Democratic nomination that year.
1948	Dixiecrat	Strom Thurmond	2.4	39	Returned to Democratic Party
1924	Progressive	Robert M. La Follette	**16.6**	13	Returned to Republican Party
1912	Progressive ("Bull Moose")	Theodore Roosevelt	**27.4**	88	Returned to Republican Party
1912	Socialist	Eugene V. Debs	6	0	Won 3.2 percent of the popular vote
1892	Populist	James B. Weaver	8.5	22	Endorsed Democratic candidate
1860	Constitutional Union	John Bell	**12.6**	39	Party dissolved
1860	Southern Democrats	John C. Breckinridge	**18.1**	72	Party dissolved
1856	American ("Know-Nothing")	Millard Fillmore	**21.5**	8	Party dissolved
1848	Free Soil	Martin Van Buren	**10.1**	0	Won 4.9 percent of the vote
1832	Anti-Masonic	William Wirt	7.7	7	Folded into the Whig Party
Percentages in **bold** are those over 10% in elections.
Source: (Bureau of International Information Programs, 2006)

== See also ==
- Frivolous political party
- Vote splitting
