= 24th New Brunswick general election =

The 24th New Brunswick general election may refer to

- the 1878 New Brunswick general election, the 24th overall general election for New Brunswick, for the 24th New Brunswick Legislative Assembly, but considered the 4th general election for the Canadian province of New Brunswick, or
- the 1960 New Brunswick general election, the 44th overall general election for New Brunswick, for the 44th New Brunswick Legislative Assembly, but considered the 24th general election for the Canadian province of New Brunswick.
