= 34th New Brunswick general election =

The 34th New Brunswick general election may refer to

- the 1917 New Brunswick general election, the 34th overall general election for New Brunswick, for the 34th New Brunswick Legislative Assembly, but considered the 14th general election for the Canadian province of New Brunswick, or
- the 1999 New Brunswick general election, the 54th overall general election for New Brunswick, for the 54th New Brunswick Legislative Assembly, but considered the 34th general election for the Canadian province of New Brunswick.
