= 10th New Brunswick general election =

The 10th New Brunswick general election may refer to:

- 1830 New Brunswick general election, the 10th general election to take place in the Colony of New Brunswick, for the 10th New Brunswick Legislative Assembly
- 1899 New Brunswick general election, the 30th overall general election for New Brunswick, for the 30th New Brunswick Legislative Assembly, but considered the 10th general election for the Canadian province of New Brunswick.
