= 25th New Brunswick general election =

The 25th New Brunswick general election may refer to

- the 1882 New Brunswick general election, the 25th overall general election for New Brunswick, for the 25th New Brunswick Legislative Assembly, but considered the 5th general election for the Canadian province of New Brunswick, or
- the 1963 New Brunswick general election, the 45th overall general election for New Brunswick, for the 45th New Brunswick Legislative Assembly, but considered the 25th general election for the Canadian province of New Brunswick.
