= 14th New Brunswick general election =

The 14th New Brunswick general election may refer to:

- 1846 New Brunswick general election, the 14th general election to take place in the Colony of New Brunswick, for the 14th New Brunswick Legislative Assembly
- 1917 New Brunswick general election, the 34th overall general election for New Brunswick, for the 34th New Brunswick Legislative Assembly, but considered the 14th general election for the Canadian province of New Brunswick
