= 12th New Brunswick general election =

12th New Brunswick general election may refer to:

- 1837 New Brunswick general election, the 12th general election to take place in the Colony of New Brunswick, for the 12th New Brunswick Legislative Assembly
- 1908 New Brunswick general election, the 32nd overall general election for New Brunswick, for the 32nd New Brunswick Legislative Assembly, but considered the 12th general election for the Canadian province of New Brunswick
