= List of pre-confederation New Brunswick general elections =

This article lists General Elections in the British colony of the Province of New Brunswick from 1784 to its entry into the Canadian Confederation in 1867. Prior to 1784, New Brunswick was Sunbury County, Nova Scotia and it returned members to the Nova Scotia House of Assembly.

For elections after Confederation, see List of New Brunswick general elections (post-Confederation).

== List ==
- 21st General Election: May – June 1866. The Government was formed of 33 pro-confederation MLAs, with 8 anti-confederation MLAs forming the opposition.
- 20th General Election: February – March 1865
- 19th General Election: June 1861
- 18th General Election: April – May 1857
- 17th General Election: June – July 1856
- 16th General Election: June 1854
- 15th General Election: June – July 1850
- 14th General Election: October 1846
- 13th General Election: December 1842 – January 1843
- 12th General Election: September – October 1837
- 11th General Election: December 1834 – January 1835
- 10th General Election: October 1830
- 9th General Election: June 1827
- 8th General Election: June 1820
- 7th General Election: October 1819
- 6th General Election: August – September 1816
- 5th General Election: September – October 1809
- 4th General Election: October – November 1802
- 3rd General Election: August – September 1795
- 2nd General Election: December 1792 – January 1793
- 1st General Election: November – December 1785
