= 5th New Brunswick general election =

The 5th New Brunswick general election may refer to:

- 1809 New Brunswick general election, the 5th general election to take place in the Colony of New Brunswick, for the 5th New Brunswick Legislative Assembly
- 1882 New Brunswick general election, the 25th overall general election for New Brunswick, for the 25th New Brunswick Legislative Assembly, but considered the 5th general election for the Canadian province of New Brunswick
