= 15th New Brunswick general election =

The 15th New Brunswick general election may refer to:

- 1850 New Brunswick general election, the 15th general election to take place in the Colony of New Brunswick, for the 15th New Brunswick Legislative Assembly
- 1920 New Brunswick general election, the 35th overall general election for New Brunswick, for the 35th New Brunswick Legislative Assembly, but considered the 15th general election for the Canadian province of New Brunswick
