= 13th New Brunswick general election =

13th New Brunswick general election may refer to:

- 1843 New Brunswick general election, the 13th general election to take place in the Colony of New Brunswick, for the 13th New Brunswick Legislative Assembly
- 1912 New Brunswick general election, the 33rd overall general election for New Brunswick, for the 33rd New Brunswick Legislative Assembly, but considered the 13th general election for the Canadian province of New Brunswick
