= 21st New Brunswick general election =

The 21st New Brunswick general election may refer to

- the 1866 New Brunswick general election, the 21st general election to take place in the Colony of New Brunswick, for the 21st New Brunswick Legislative Assembly, but considered the 1st general election for the Canadian province of New Brunswick, or
- the 1948 New Brunswick general election, the 41st overall general election for New Brunswick, for the 41st New Brunswick Legislative Assembly, but considered the 21st general election for the Canadian province of New Brunswick.
