= 2nd New Brunswick general election =

The 2nd New Brunswick general election may refer to:

- 1793 New Brunswick general election, the 2nd general election to take place in the Colony of New Brunswick, for the 2nd New Brunswick Legislative Assembly
- 1870 New Brunswick general election, the 22nd overall general election for New Brunswick, for the 22nd New Brunswick Legislative Assembly, but considered the 2nd general election for the Canadian province of New Brunswick
