= 4th New Brunswick general election =

The 4th New Brunswick general election may refer to:

- 1802 New Brunswick general election, the 4th general election to take place in the Colony of New Brunswick, for the 4th New Brunswick Legislative Assembly
- 1878 New Brunswick general election, the 24th overall general election for New Brunswick, for the 24th New Brunswick Legislative Assembly, but considered the 4th general election for the Canadian province of New Brunswick
