= List of Alberta general elections =

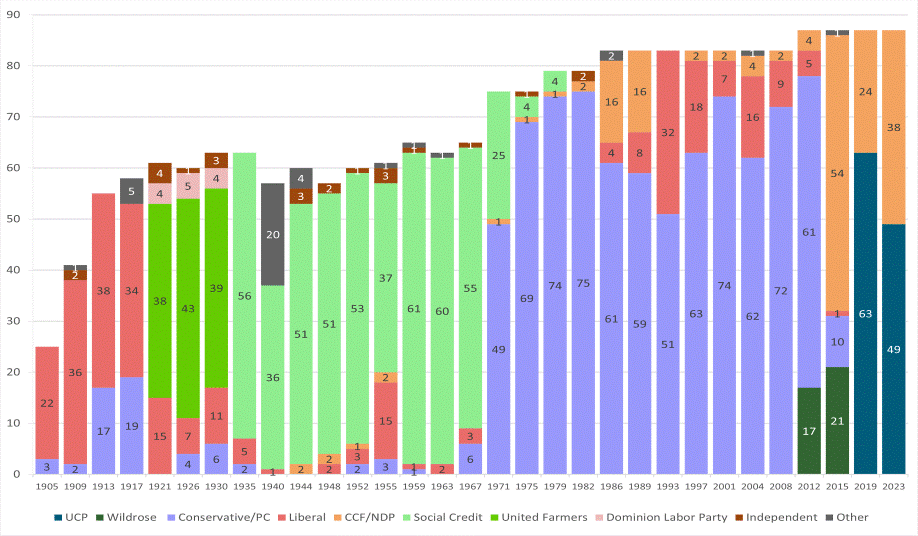
Number of seats won by major parties at each election: UCP; Wildrose; Conservative/PC; Liberal; CCF/NDP; Social Credit; United Farmers; Dominion Labour Party; Independents; Other

The Canadian province of Alberta holds elections to its unicameral legislative body, the Legislative Assembly of Alberta. The maximum period between general elections of the assembly is five years, but the Lieutenant Governor is able to call one at any time. However, the premier has typically asked the lieutenant governor to call the election in the fourth or fifth year after the preceding election. The number of seats has increased over time, from 25 for the first election in 1905, to the current 87.

Alberta's politics has historically been one of long-lasting governments with government changes being few and far between. The province from 1905 to 2015 was ruled by four "dynasties": the Liberal Party (1905–1921); the United Farmers of Alberta (1921–1935), the Social Credit Party (1935–1971), and the Progressive Conservative (PC) Association (1971–2015), the longest political dynasty in Canada. Since 2015 Alberta has had two different governments: The Alberta New Democratic party led by Rachel Notley (2015-2019) and United Conservative Party (2019 to the present). In every election one party has taken a majority of seats. No minority government has ever been elected in Alberta. Thus, Alberta can be said to have continuously had a dominant-party system for its entire political history, though the dominant party has changed over time.

In 2015, the NDP were elected to government for the first time in Alberta's history. The NDP had Alberta's only one term government thus far.

In 2019, the newly formed United Conservative Party formed the government.

From 1909 to 1959, Alberta elections used a combination of single-member and multi-member districts. From 1905 to 1924, each voter cast as many votes as seats to be filled in the district. From 1924 to the present, each voter has been able to cast just one vote.

From 1905 to 1924, plurality was enough to be elected.

From 1924 to 1959, each voter cast a ranked ballot, in a hybrid system of Single Transferable Voting in multi-member districts in the cities and Instant-runoff voting in single-member districts outside the cities, producing proportional representation in the cities and majority-winner results elsewhere. Only Alberta and Manitoba have used a proportional representation system in the history of Canada, although in both provinces it was applied only partially.

Since 1959, Alberta's elections have used single-member plurality, also known as First-past-the-post voting.

== Summary ==
The table below shows the total number of seats won by each political party in each election. Full details on any election are linked via the year of the election at the start of the row, and details for the legislature that followed the election are available at the legislature number. Note that election results show differences at 1926 and 1959, when different electoral systems were adopted, as described in the "Electoral system" section.

Year	Seats	Winner	Legislature	United Conservative Party	Progressive Conservative^{[A]}	Liberal	NDP^{[B]}	Social Credit	United Farmers	Dominion Labor	Ind.	Other elected members	Other parties	Voter turnout
1905	25	Liberal	1st		3	22
1909	41	Liberal	2nd		2	36					2	1	Socialist
1913	56^{[C]}	Liberal	3rd		17	38
1917	58	Liberal	4th		19	34						5	1 Labor Representation League 2 Alberta Non-Partisan League 2 non-partisan members elected by Soldiers and Nurses voting in 2-seat district (plurality block voting)
1921	61	United Farmers	5th			15			38	4	4
1926	60	United Farmers	6th		4	7			43	5	1
1930	63	United Farmers	7th		6	11			39	4	3
1935	63	Social Credit	8th		2	5		56						81.8%
1940	57	Social Credit	9th			1		36				20	Independent Movement (19), Labour (1)
1944	60	Social Credit	10th				2	51			3	4	Navy, Army and Air Force reps. (overseas, non-partisan)(3 elected through first-past-the-post voting); Veterans' and Active Force (Edmonton)(1)
1948	57	Social Credit	11th			2	2	51			2
1952	60	Social Credit	12th		2	3	1	53			1
1955	61	Social Credit	13th		3	15	2	37			3	1	Coalition
1959	65	Social Credit	14th		1	1		61			1	1	Coalition
1963	63	Social Credit	15th			2		60				1	Coalition
1967	65	Social Credit	16th		6	3		55			1
1971	75	PC	17th		49		1	25
1975	75	PC	18th		69		1	4			1			59.58%
1979	79	PC	19th		74		1	4						58.71%
1982	79	PC	20th		75		2				2			66.00%
1986	83	PC	21st		61	4	16					2	Representative	47.25%
1989	83	PC	22nd		59	8	16							53.60%
1993	83	PC	23rd		51	32								60.21%
1997	83	PC	24th		63	18	2							53.75%
2001	83	PC	25th		74	7	2							53.38%
2004	83	PC	26th		62	16	4					1	Alberta Alliance	45.12%
2008	83	PC	27th		72	9	2							40.59%
2012	87	PC	28th		61	5	4					17	Wildrose	56.96%
2015	87	NDP	29th		10	1	54					22	Wildrose (21), Alberta Party (1)	58.4%
2019	87	UCP	30th	63			24							64.0%
2023	87	UCP	31st	49			38							62.4%

=== Notes ===
^{A} Known as the Conservative Party prior to 1959.
^{B} Known as the Co-operative Commonwealth Federation (CCF) prior to 1963.
^{C} In 1913, 55 people occupied 56 seats. C.W. Cross was elected in two different districts.

== Electoral system ==
Alberta has used a variety of electoral systems in its history, notably a combination of single transferable vote (STV) and instant-runoff voting (IRV) for nearly four decades.

=== Electoral systems of Alberta ===
Elections	Edmonton	Calgary	Medicine Hat	Rest of Alberta
1905	First past the post (Single-member plurality)			
1909	Two-member Block Voting in each city		First past the post	
1913	Two-member Block Voting	First past the post		
1917	First past the post (except two elected by soldiers and nurses — Block Voting)			
1921	Five-member Block Voting in each city		Two-member Block Voting	First past the post
1926	Five-member city-wide districts in each city Single Transferable Voting		Two-member Single transferable vote	Single-member Instant-runoff voting
1930–1959	Multiple-member city-wide districts (5–7 members per city) Single Transferable Voting		Single-member instant-runoff voting	
1945 Jan 9–20 to 1948				3 Armed Forces MLAs (elected through first-past-the-post voting)
1959–present	First past the post (Single-member plurality)			

Alberta's first election was fought in 25 single-member districts using first past the post. The Liberal government, like other Canadian jurisdictions at the time, introduced two-member constituencies in Edmonton and Calgary in 1909 to accommodate the cities' larger population. Voting in these multi-member districts was by Block Voting.

The districts of Edmonton and Calgary were re-drawn in 1913 and Calgary was divided into three single-member districts. Edmonton remained a two-seat district. By 1917 Edmonton was broken up into three single-member districts, as the overall number of members and districts increased. As well 1917 saw two other innovations - election of two MLAs by soldiers and nurses overseas; and automatic re-election of 11 MLAs who were serving in the armed forces.

The Liberal government returned Edmonton and Calgary to city-wide multi-seat districts in 1921. Edmonton and Calgary each had five MLAs who were elected through Block Voting. The government also composed the Medicine Hat as a two-member district. Each voter in the cities was given five votes, in Medicine Hat two votes. The Liberal party led the vote in Edmonton (although not taking a majority of the city vote) and its candidates received multiple votes from the same voters, together taking more votes than the number of Edmontonians who voted. Liberals won all five of Edmonton's seats. Because each voter cast multiple votes in the cities where UFA ran only one candidate, the Liberal party vote tally is inflated (with many of its supporters casting multiple votes for party candidates) while each UFA vote truly represents an individual voter. Although it did not win any seats in the cities, the United Farmers won most of the rural seats. Overall it won a majority of the seats in the Legislature and formed government.

The UFA government, which had campaigned on a promise of electoral reform, retained the existing multi-seat districts and adopted Single Transferable Voting in Edmonton, Calgary and Medicine Hat. Instant-runoff voting (IRV) (AKA Alternative Voting) was put into use elsewhere. STV in Edmonton and Calgary produced mixed roughly proportional results in the election of city MLAs.

IRV elsewhere had little impact as the UFA candidates usually took a majority of the vote in the district on the First Count. One very popular party was the pattern for the next several decades - the governing party, the UFA, followed by the Social Credit - taking a majority of the rural seats, and STV in the cities giving each party its proportion of the city seats. These parallel systems, STV in the cities and IRV in the rest of the province, were used for eight elections over three decades.

During these eight elections the only modifications made were that Albertans serving in armed forces in 1944 elected three representatives, one for each branch - army, navy and air force; Medicine Hat was changed to a single-member district prior to the 1930 election; and the number of MLAs sitting for Edmonton and Calgary changed over time.

Until recently, the pattern has been for one party to take a majority of the seats outside the cities, usually by a majority of the vote outright. Due to the relative small number of seats in the cities, that ensured the party's ascendancy to power. The UFA did not, but the SC and Conservative governments usually took several city seats as well as most of the rural seats.

This pattern was modulated in the 1950s. Due to change to First past the post in the cities, the one-party ascendency was raised to higher level. (Elsewhere the change from IRV to first past the post did not make much difference.)

In 1955, the SC government was again re-elected with a great majority of the seats but for the first time IRV changed the outcome in four districts. In these districts a SC candidate led in the first count but did not take a majority of the vote and each lost out when votes were transferred as per IRV.

After this, Ernest Manning's Social Credit government abolished the mixed STV/IRV system, without public consultations and with no referendum. The city-wide districts in Edmonton and Calgary were broken up and single-member districts were created, and the use of transferable votes was ended. The government reintroduced first past the post across the province, not seen across the board since 1905. The SC government reaped a windfall of seats in the 1959 election under the new voting system, winning every seat in Edmonton and all but one in Calgary. This result was far in excess of its share of the city vote.

First past the post remains the system used in Alberta and is currently used throughout Canada for provincial and federal elections.

== See also ==
- Timeline of Canadian elections
- List of political parties in Alberta – for present and historical political parties in Alberta.
