= 26th New Brunswick general election =

The 26th New Brunswick general election may refer to

- the 1886 New Brunswick general election, the 26th overall general election for New Brunswick, for the 26th New Brunswick Legislative Assembly, but considered the 6th general election for the Canadian province of New Brunswick, or
- the 1967 New Brunswick general election, the 46th overall general election for New Brunswick, for the 46th New Brunswick Legislative Assembly, but considered the 26th general election for the Canadian province of New Brunswick.
