= List of post-confederation Nova Scotia general elections =

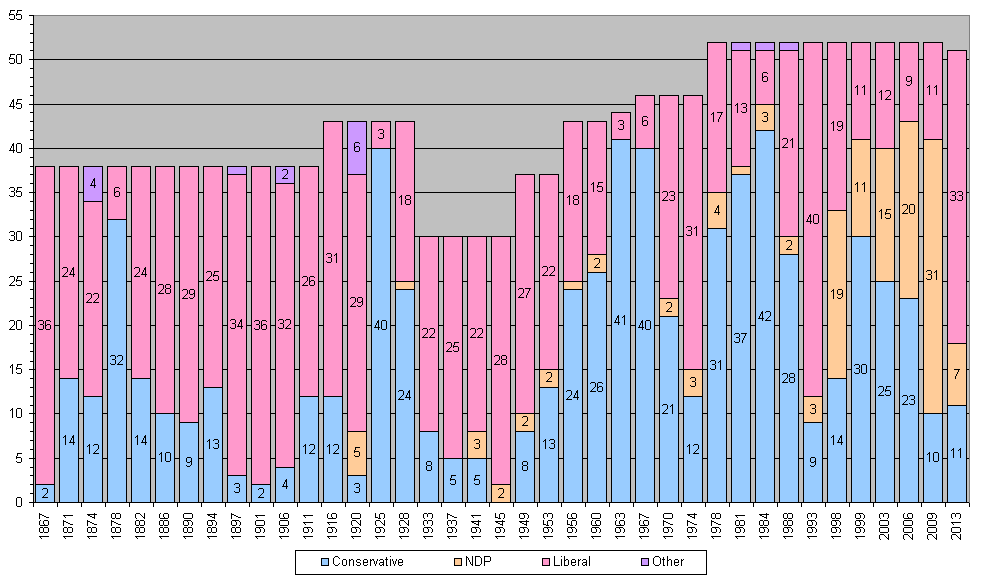
Number of seats won by major parties at each election: Conservative/PC / Liberal / NDP / Other

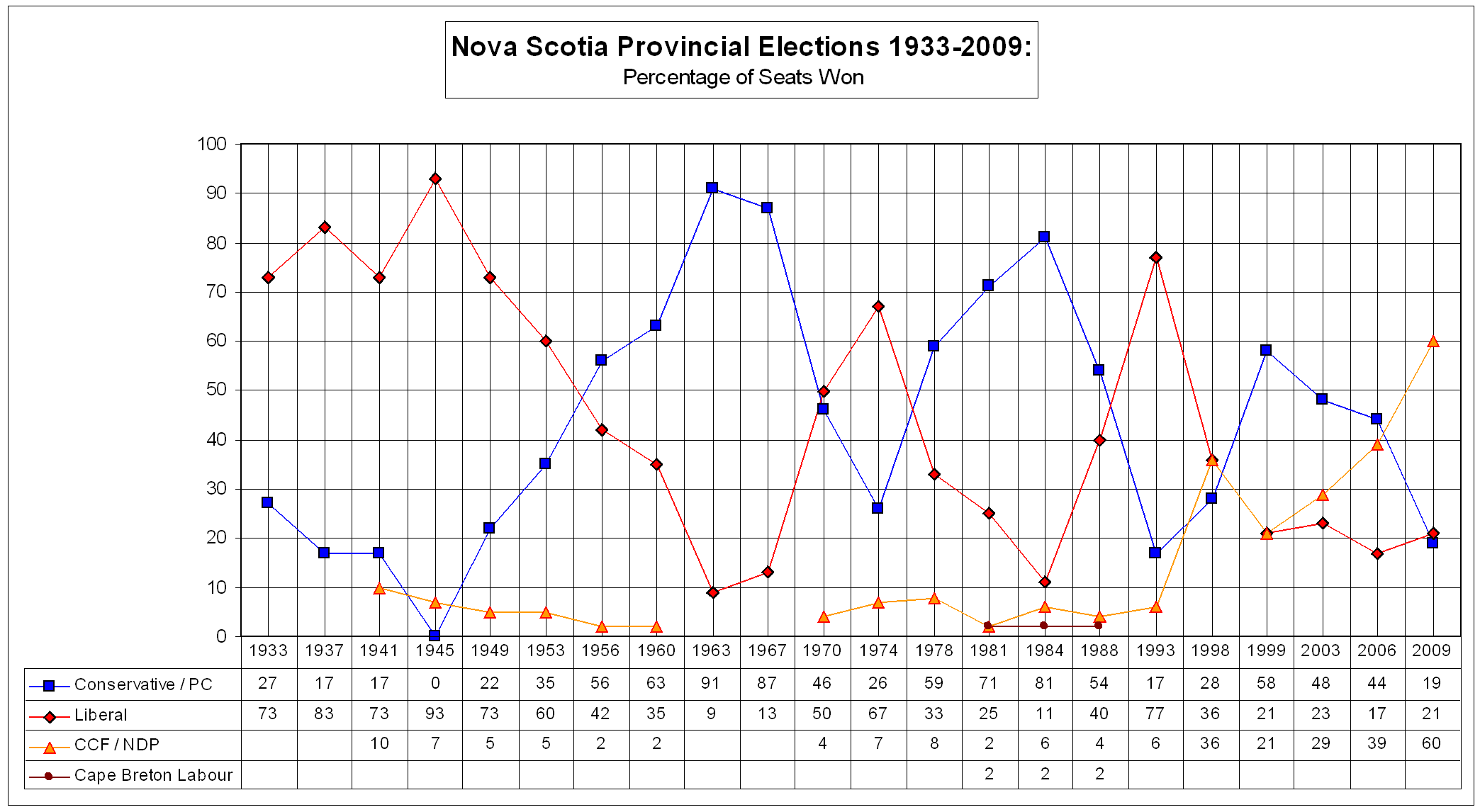
Electoral results by parties and independent MLAs (as a percentage of total House of Assembly seats) from 1933 to 2009.

This article provides a summary of results for the general elections to the Canadian province of Nova Scotia's unicameral legislative body, the Nova Scotia House of Assembly. The number of seats has varied over time, from a low of thirty during the 1930s and early 1940s, to the current high of fifty-two. This article only covers elections since Nova Scotia became part of the newly formed Canadian Confederation in 1867. Prior to that, Nova Scotia was a British colony. The Nova Scotia House of Assembly dates back to 1758, and Nova Scotia became the first British colony to be granted responsible government from London in 1848.

The chart on the upper right provides a graphical summary of the results, with the most recent elections towards the right. It shows how the Liberal party (red) dominated the province's early political history, winning nineteen of the first twenty-two elections from 1867 to 1953; and that since 1953, the Conservatives (blue) have been the most successful party, winning eleven of the fifteen elections since then. The New Democratic Party (orange), after winning Official Opposition status in four consecutive elections, finally achieved government for the first time in the 2009 election.

== Results ==
The table below shows the total number of seats won by the major political parties at each election. It also shows the percentage of the vote obtained by the major political parties at each election, if greater than 0.1%. The winning party's totals are shown in bold. To date, no party has formed a government that did not have the largest share of the vote. Full details on any election are linked via the number of the election at the start of the row.

Election		Total seats	PC^{[A]}		Liberal		NDP^{[B]}		Other		
Election		Total seats	Seats	Vote (%)	Seats	Vote (%)	Seats	Vote (%)	Seats	Seat-winning party	Vote (%)
1st	September 18, 1867	38	2^{[C]}	38.5^{[C]}	**36**^{[D]}	**58.6**^{[D]}					2.9
2nd	May 16, 1871	38	14	43.7	**24**	**52.2**					4.0
3rd	December 17, 1874	38	12	43.6	**22**	**55.0**			4	Independents	1.4
4th	September 17, 1878	38	**32**	**51.7**	6	45.1					3.1
5th	June 20, 1882	38	14	46.9	**24**	**51.8**					1.3
6th	June 1886	37	10	43.6	**28**	**54.7**					1.6
7th	May 1890	38	9	46.7	**29**	**52.2**					1.0
8th	March 1894	37	13	47.3	**25**	**51.9**					0.8
9th	April 13, 1897	38	3	44.4	**34**	**55.0**			1	Independent	0.5
10th	October 2, 1901	38	2	41.7	**36**	**56.7**					1.5
11th	June 20, 1906	38	4	42.1	**32**	**53.2**			2	Independents	4.6
12th	June 14, 1911	38	12	45.4	**26**	**51.1**					3.5
13th	June 20, 1916	43	12	48.8	**31**	**50.4**					0.8
14th	July 27, 1920	43	3	24.7	**29**	**44.4**	5	16.9	6	United Farmers	14.0
15th	June 25, 1925	43	**40**	**60.9**	3	36.3	–	2.8			
16th	October 1, 1928	43	**24**	**51.7**	18	47.2	1	1.1			
17th	August 22, 1933	30	8	45.9	**22**	**52.6**	–	1.5			
18th	June 20, 1937	30	5	46.0	**25**	**52.9**	–	1.1			
19th	October 28, 1941	30	5	40.3	**22**	**52.7**	3	7.0			
20th	October 23, 1945	30	0	33.5	**28**	**52.7**	2	13.6			0.1
21st	June 9, 1949	37	8	39.2	**27**	**51.0**	2	9.6			0.1
22nd	May 26, 1953	37	13	43.6	**22**	**49.0**	2	6.9			0.5
23rd	October 30, 1956	43	**24**	**48.6**	18	48.2	1	3.0			0.1
24th	June 7, 1960	43	**27**	**48.3**	15	42.6	1	8.9			0.2
25th	October 8, 1963	43	**39**	**56.2**	4	39.7	–	4.1			
26th	May 30, 1967	46	**40**	**52.8**	6	41.8	–	5.2			0.2
27th	October 13, 1970	46	21	46.9	**23**	**46.1**	2	6.7			0.2
28th	April 2, 1974	46	12	38.6	**31**	**47.9**	3	13.0			0.5
29th	September 19, 1978	52	**31**	**45.8**	17	39.4	4	14.4			0.4
30th	October 6, 1981	52	**37**	**47.5**	13	33.2	1	18.1	1	Cape Breton Labour	1.2
31st	November 6, 1984	52	**42**	**50.6**	6	31.3	3	15.9	1	Cape Breton Labour	2.2^{[E]}
32nd	September 6, 1988	52	**28**	**43.4**	21	39.6	2	15.8	1	Cape Breton Labour	1.1
33rd	May 25, 1993	52	9	31.1	**40**	**49.7**	3	17.7			0.9
34th	March 24, 1998	52	14	29.8	**19**	**35.3**	19	34.6			2.4
35th	July 27, 1999	52	**30**	**39.2**	11	29.8	11	30.0			1.1
36th	August 5, 2003	52	**25**	**36.3**	12	31.5	15	31.0			1.2
37th	June 13, 2006	52	**23**	**39.6**	9	23.4	20	34.6			2.4
38th	June 9, 2009	52	10	24.5	11	27.2	**31**	**45.3**			3.0
39th	October 8, 2013	51	11	26.3	**33**	**45.7**	7	26.8			1.2
40th	May 30, 2017	51	17	35.78	**27**	**39.51**	7	21.41			3.3
41st	August 18, 2021	55	**31**	**38.44**	17	36.67	6	20.93	1	Independent	1.17
42nd	November 26, 2024	55	**43**	**52.49**	2	22.69	9	22.17	1	Independent	1.18

=== Notes ===
^{A} Includes results for Progressive Conservatives.
^{B} Includes results for Co-operative Commonwealth Federation prior to 1963; and also results for the Labour party prior to 1937.
^{C} Includes Pro Confederation.
^{D} Includes Anti-Confederates.
^{E} Includes 2.0% for Cape Breton Labour Party.

== See also ==
- Timeline of Canadian elections
- List of political parties in Nova Scotia
