= List of Manitoba general elections =

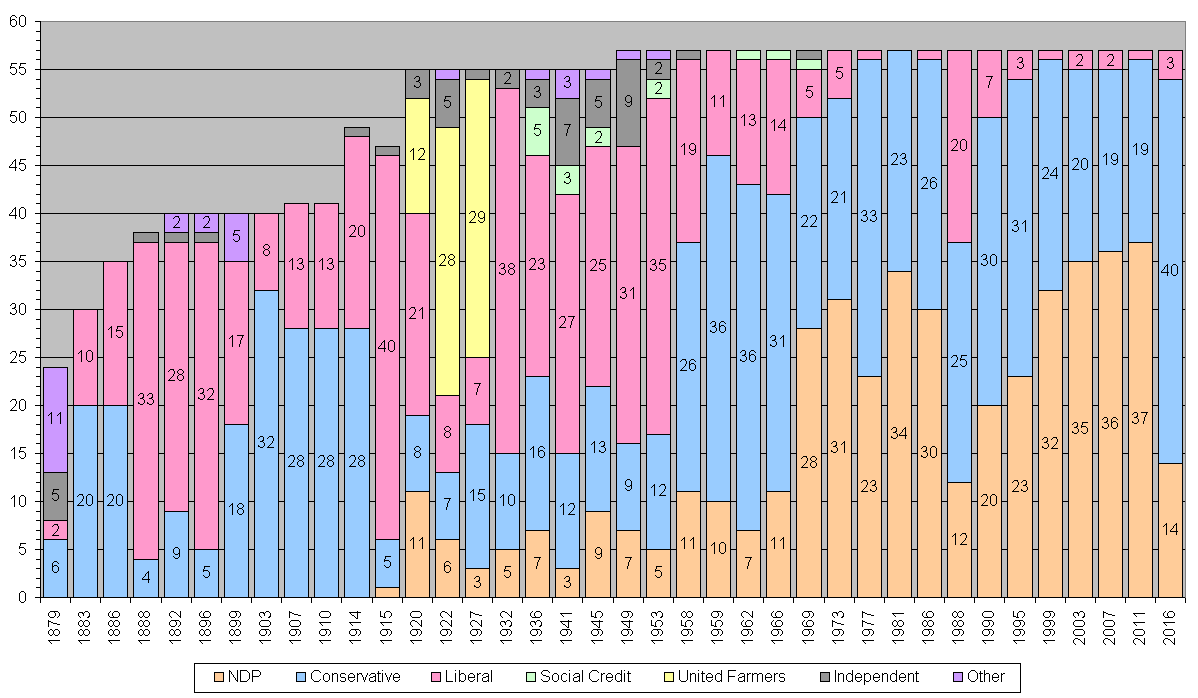
Number of seats won by major parties at each election: Conservative/PC; CCF/NDP; Liberal; United Farmers; Social Credit; Other; Independent

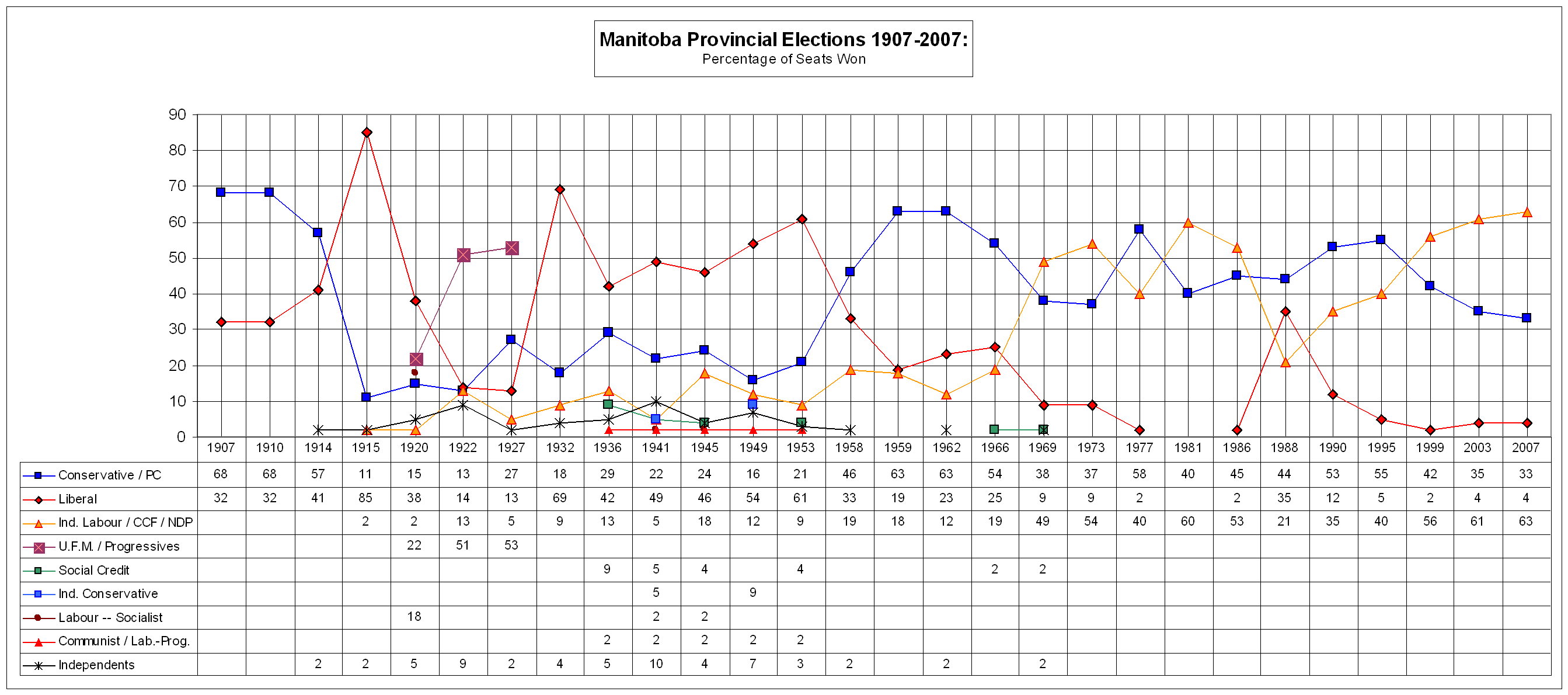
Electoral results by parties and independent MLAs (as a percentage of total Legislative Assembly seats) from 1907 to 2007.

The Canadian province of Manitoba hold elections to its unicameral legislative body, the Legislative Assembly of Manitoba. The normal period between general elections of the assembly is five years, but the Lieutenant Governor is able to call one at any time. The number of seats has increased over time, from 24 for the first election, to the present 57.

The chart on the upper right shows the information graphically, with the most recent elections towards the right. It show the dominance of the Conservative party (blue) and Liberal party (red) prior to World War I; the inter-war wins of the United Farmers party (yellow); and the post-World War II rise of the NDP (orange), which mirrors the decline of the Liberal Party. The narrow wins of the Progressive Conservative Party (blue) in the 1960s and 1980s can also be made out.

== Results ==
The table below shows the total number of seats won by the major political parties at each election. The winning party's total is shown in bold. Full details on any election are linked via the year of the election at the start of the row.

| Year | Seats | PC^{[B]} | | Liberal^{[C]} | | NDP^{[A]} | | Social Credit | | United Farmers^{[D]} | | Independent | | Other Parties | |
| Year | Seats | Seats | Votes (%) | Seats | Votes (%) | Seats | Votes (%) | Seats | Votes (%) | Seats | Votes (%) | Seats | Votes (%) | Seats | Votes (%) |
|---|---|---|---|---|---|---|---|---|---|---|---|---|---|---|---|
| 1879 | 24 | **6** | | 2 | | | | | | 5^{[F]} | | 11 | | Liberal-Conservative(7), Independent Conservative (2), Independent Liberal, National | |
| 1883 | 30 | **20** | | 10 | | | | | | | | | | | |
| 1886 | 35 | **20** | | 15 | | | | | | | | | | | |
| 1888 | 38 | 4 | | **33** | | | | | | 1 | | | | | |
| 1892 | 40 | 9 | | **28**^{[E]} | | | | | | 1 | | 2 | | Independent Liberal | |
| 1896 | 40 | 5 | | **32** | | | | | | 1 | | 2 | | Patrons of Industry | |
| 1899 | 40 | **18** | | 17 | | | | | | | | 5 | | Independent Conservative (2); Liberal-Conservative (3) | |
| 1903 | 40 | **32** | **49.0** | 8 | 44.6 | | | | | | | | | | |
| 1907 | 41 | **28** | **50.6** | 13 | 47.9 | | | | | | | | | | |
| 1910 | 41 | **28** | **50.7** | 13 | 47.1 | | | | | | | | | | |
| 1914 | 49 | **28** | **46.9** | 20 | 42.4 | | | | | 1 | | | | | |
| 1915 | 47 | 5 | 33.0 | **40** | **55.1** | 1 | | | | 1 | | | | | |
| 1920 | 55 | 8 | 18.5 | **21** | **35.1** | 11 | | | | 12 | | | | | |
| 1922 | 55 | 7 | 15.5 | 8 | 33.2 | 6 | | | | **28** | | 1 | | Ind. Labourers | |
| 1927 | 55 | 15 | 27.2 | 7 | 20.7 | 3 | | | | **29** | | | | | |
| 1932 | 55 | 10 | 35.4 | **38** | **39.6** | 5 | | | | 2 | | | | | |
| 1936 | 55 | 16 | 27.8 | **23** | **35.3** | 7 | 12.0 | 5 | | 3 | | 1 | | Communist | |
| 1941 | 55 | 12 | 19.9 | **27** | **35.1** | 3 | 17.0 | 3 | | 7 | | 3 | | Anti-coalition Conservative | |
| 1945 | 55 | 13 | 15.9 | **25** | **32.2** | 9 | 33.8 | 2 | | 5 | | 1 | | Labor-Progressive | |
| 1949 | 57 | 9 | 19.1 | **31** | **38.7** | 7 | 25.6 | | | 9 | | 1 | | Labor-Progressive | |
| 1953 | 57 | 12 | 21.0 | **35** | **44.1** | 5 | 16.6 | 2 | | 2 | | 1 | | Labor-Progressive | |
| 1958 | 57 | **26** | **40.6** | 19 | 34.7 | 11 | 20.0 | | | 1 | | | | | |
| 1959 | 57 | **36** | **46.3** | 11 | 30.0 | 10 | 21.8 | | | | | | | | |
| 1962 | 57 | **36** | **44.7** | 13 | 36.1 | 7 | 15.2 | 1 | | | | | | | |
| 1966 | 57 | **31** | **40.0** | 14 | 33.1 | 11 | 23.1 | 1 | | | | | | | |
| 1969 | 57 | 22 | 35.6 | 5 | 24.0 | **28** | **38.3** | 1 | | 1 | | | | | |
| 1973 | 57 | 21 | 36.7 | 5 | 19.0 | **31** | **42.3** | | | | | | | | |
| 1977 | 57 | **33** | **48.8** | 1 | 12.3 | 23 | 38.6 | | | | | | | | |
| 1981 | 57 | 23 | 43.8 | – | 6.7 | **34** | **47.4** | | | | | | | | |
| 1986 | 57 | 26 | 40.6 | 1 | 13.9 | **30** | **41.5** | | | | | | | | |
| 1988 | 57 | **25** | **38.4** | 20 | 35.5 | 12 | 23.6 | | | | | | | | |
| 1990 | 57 | **30** | **42.0** | 7 | 28.2 | 20 | 28.8 | | | | | | | | |
| 1995 | 57 | **31** | **42.9** | 3 | 23.7 | 23 | 32.8 | | | | | | | | |
| 1999 | 57 | 24 | 40.8 | 1 | 13.4 | **32** | **44.5** | | | | | | | | |
| 2003 | 57 | 20 | 36.2 | 2 | 13.2 | **35** | **49.5** | | | | | | | | |
| 2007 | 57 | 19 | 38.2 | 2 | 12.4 | **36** | **47.7** | | | | | | | | |
| 2011 | 57 | 19 | 43.9 | 1 | 7.5 | **37** | **46.2** | | | | | | | | |
| 2016 | 57 | **40** | **53.2** | 3 | 14.5 | 14 | 25.7 | | | | | | | | |
| 2019 | 57 | **36** | **47.1** | 3 | 14.5 | 18 | 31.4 | | | | | | | | |
| 2023 | 57 | 22 | 42.1 | 1 | 10.8 | **34** | **45.5** | | | | | | | | |

Notes
^{A} Includes results for the Co-operative Commonwealth Federation (1936 to 1959), Independent Labour Party (1922 to 1936), Labour (1920), Socialists (1920) and Social Democrats (1915 and 1920).
^{B} Includes results for Progressive Conservatives, and also the Independent Conservative candidate elected in 1903.
^{C} Includes results for the Liberal-Progressive party.
^{D} Includes results for the Progressive party in 1927.
^{E} Includes the two Liberal-Conservatives elected, who were members of the government.
^{F} Includes those of unknown party status.

=== Elections prior to provincial political parties ===
Until the 1879 election, political parties were not active in the province. However, some candidates declared their support for (or opposition to) the administration of the time. Full details on any election are linked via the year of the election at the start of the row.

| Year | Seats | Government | Opposition | Other |
|---|---|---|---|---|
| 1870 | 24 | **17** | 5 | 2 |
| 1874 | 24 | **9** | 6 | 9 |
| 1878 | 24 | **16** | 8 |

== See also ==
- Timeline of Canadian elections
- List of political parties in Manitoba
- Manitoba Cooperative Commonwealth Federation candidates, 1949 Manitoba provincial election
