= List of British Columbia general elections =

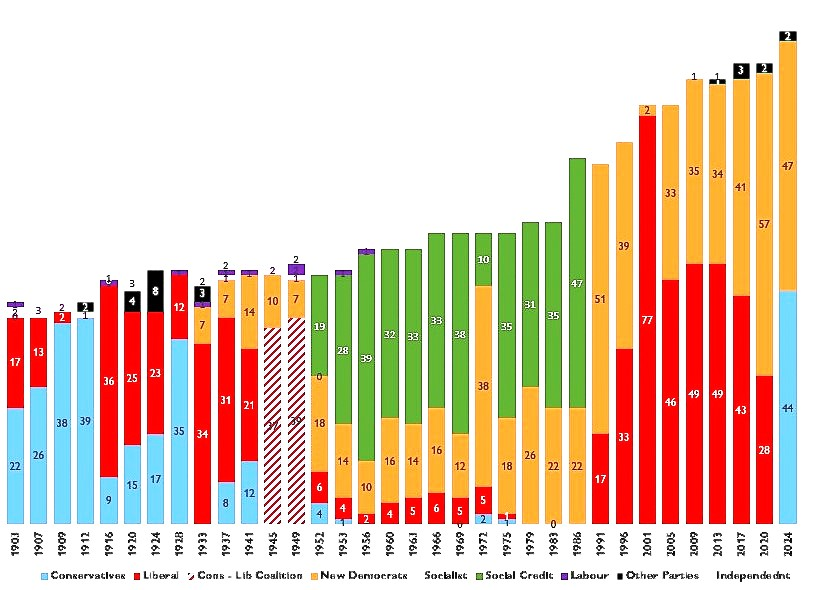
Seats won by parties in each election.

Elections to the unicameral legislative body of the Canadian province of British Columbia, the Legislative Assembly of British Columbia, are held every four years. Fixed election dates for the Legislative Assembly of British Columbia, occurring every four years, were instituted in 2002, after the Constitution (Fixed Election Dates) Amendment Act (SBC 2001 c.36) was passed in 2001. The regular election date for the Legislative Assembly is set to occur on the third Saturday in October in the fourth calendar year after the previous election, with the next election scheduled on or before October 21, 2028.

The number of seats has increased over time, from 25 for the first election in 1871, to the current 93.

Every election from 1871 to 1986 elected a portion of its MLAs from multi-member constituencies, usually two-member constituencies. Voters in these districts had as many votes as there were seats (block-voting), and generally the party with the most supporters in the district filled all the seats, with no representation left for the others. This generally helped ensure the sitting government's capture of the most seats. (It also makes the "popular vote", the votes cast, not truly reflective of the sentiment of the voters, due to some voters casting two (or more votes) and others only one.)

Until the 1903 election, British Columbia politics were officially non-partisan – political parties were not part of the official process. One of the first parties to be noticed in BC politics, the Nationalist Party espoused "National Socialism", based on Edward Bellamy's writings, and favoured nationalization of industry. Its candidate Robert Macpherson was elected MLA in 1894 and 1898.

The general non-partisanship changed in the 1898 and 1900 elections with the official listing of party candidates, and federal political parties were recognized in the provincial election of 1903. The first elections held along party lines (1903–1941) were primarily contested by the Conservative Party (which won five elections during this period) and the Liberal Party (which won six elections).

For three terms during and immediately after World War II, the legislature was managed by a coalition government between the Conservatives and the Liberals. The Social Credit Party dominated elections from 1952 to 1986, winning eleven of the twelve elections (the single exception a NDP victory). Provincial politics since 1986 have been dominated by the New Democratic Party (NDP) which won both elections held in the 1990s, and by the Liberal Party, which won the 2001 election and the next three elections.

Since 2017, the government has been formed by the NDP. From 2017 to 2020, the NDP formed a minority government with a confidence and supply agreement with the Green Party. Following the 2020 election, the NDP formed a majority government.

== Absentee voting ==
Contemporary elections in British Columbia use a relatively unique system of handling absentee ballots. While all jurisdictions in Canada allow for absentee voting through advance communication with the appropriate federal or provincial election agency, British Columbia is unique in allowing same-day absentee voting at any polling station in the province; ballots so cast are not counted locally on election night, however, but are sent to the voter's home riding and counted two weeks after election day. One important effect of this is that a particularly close race, such as the nine-vote margin that initially separated the main candidates in Courtenay-Comox in the 2017 election, may not have a winner officially declared until the absentee ballots have been counted at the later date; as well, because the absentee vote tends to favour the New Democratic Party rather than the Liberal Party, a district narrowly won by the Liberals has a higher chance of being flipped by absentee voters than a narrow NDP win does.

The system exists both to serve commuters in the Greater Vancouver Area, where requiring people to vote at home frequently forced suburban districts to cope with sudden crowds of late voters at the end of the day, pushing past poll closing time and delaying the counting of the results in those areas, and because the province has a much higher than normal proportion of people who work away from home for long periods in remote natural resources sites.

== Results ==
=== Before 1903 ===
Year	Seats	Government	Non-government
1871	25	No information available	
1875	25	8	17
1878	25	8	17
1882	25	5	20
1886	27	19	8
1890	33	17	16
1894	33	20	13
1898	38	18	20
1900	38	6	32

Prior the 1903 election, political parties in British Columbia were not officially recognized in provincial elections. During this period, some candidates declared their support for the administration as "Government" candidates, while those not in support ran as "Non-Government" or Independent candidates. However, these pre-election alignments often did not persist once the House was seated as allegiances would frequently shift.

In 1894, Labour and Farmer candidates were elected. As well, a socialist-oriented "National Party" candidate was elected that year.

There were also unofficial yet unstable parties. Premiers Amor De Cosmos and Joseph Martin both sat, at various times, in the federal House of Commons as Liberals, while Premier Edward Gawler Prior sat in the House of Commons as a Conservative. There was also a clear grouping of members who would often sit in opposition to, or in the cabinet of, certain other premiers. De Cosmos and his unofficial Liberals mutually supported each other (i.e. were in each other's cabinets). These premiers included McCreight, Walkem, Bevean, Semlin, and Martin. Meanwhile, Premiers Prior, Dunsmuir, Turner, A.E.B. Davie, Robson, Theodore Davie, Smithe, and Elliot sat in each other's cabinets or otherwise supported one another; while premiers from one group often sat in opposition to premiers from the other.

=== Since 1903 ===
Party colour key
New Democratic	Liberal	Conservative (Note: "Progressive Conservative" from 1942 to 1991)
Co-operative Commonwealth	Green	Social Credit
Socialist		Reform
Labour		Provincial

"Other" encompasses Independent seats and parties that never won more than one seat in an election.

Year	Summary	Government	Official opposition	Third party	Fourth party	Other	Total seats	Turnout
1903	In the first partisan election, the Conservative Party, led by Richard McBride, are elected over the Liberal Party, led by James Alexander MacDonald. Two Socialists and one labour candidate are elected.	22	17	2	–	1	42	N/A
1907	The Conservatives, led by Premier McBride, are re-elected, defeating the Liberals, led by MacDonald.	26	13	3	–	–	42	N/A
1909	The Conservatives, led by Premier McBride, are re-elected, defeating the Liberals, led by MacDonald.	38	2	2	–	–	42	N/A
1912	The Conservatives, led by Premier McBride, are re-elected. The Liberals, led by Harlan Carey Brewster, lose their seats in the legislature, resulting in the Socialist Party taking the role of Official Opposition.	39	1	–	–	2	42	N/A
1916	The Liberals, led by Brewster, defeat the Conservatives, now led by Premier William John Bowser.	36	9	–	–	2	47	N/A
1920	The Liberals, now led by Premier John Oliver, are re-elected, defeating the Conservatives under Bowser. The Federated Labour Party wins three seats.	26	14	3	–	4	47	N/A
1924	The Liberals, led by Premier Oliver, are re-elected, defeating the Conservatives under Bowser. The Canadian Labour Party and Provincial Party win three seats each.	23	17	3	3	2	48	N/A
1928	The Conservatives, led by Simon Fraser Tolmie, defeat the Liberals under Premier John Duncan MacLean.	35	12	–	–	1	48	N/A
1933	The Liberals, led by Duff Pattullo, win election. The new Co-operative Commonwealth Federation, led by Robert Connell, forms the Opposition. The incumbent Conservatives split into multiple factions and win only 4 seats, with the remaining 2 seats going to a Labour member and an independent. Columbia and Revelstoke were merged at this election but were re-divided with a by-election held to return the legislature to 48 seats.	34	7	4 (Note: 2 Non-Partisan, 1 Unionist, 1 Oxford Group)	–	2	47	N/A
1937	The Liberals, led by Premier Pattullo, are re-elected. The Conservatives, reunited under Frank Porter Patterson, form the Opposition.	31	8	7	–	2	48	N/A
1941	The Liberals, led by Premier Pattullo, win a plurality of seats and form a coalition, led by Liberal John Hart over Pattullo's objection, with the third-place Conservative Party. The CCF, under Harold Winch, form the Opposition.	21	14	12	–	1	48	N/A
1945	The Liberal–Conservative coalition runs a joint slate of candidates. The Coalition, led by Premier John Hart, is re-elected, defeating the CCF under Winch.	37	10	–	–	1	48	N/A
1949	The Coalition, now led by Premier Boss Johnson, is re-elected, defeating the CCF under Winch.	39	7	–	–	2	48	N/A
1952	The Coalition splits, and the Liberals and Conservatives (now Progressive Conservatives) contest the election independently. The new Social Credit Party wins a plurality of seats and forms a minority government with the support of a labour MLA.	19	18	6	4	1	48	N/A
1953	The Social Credit Party, led by Premier W. A. C. Bennett, wins a majority government. The CCF, led by Arnold Webster, forms the Opposition.	28	14	4	1	1	48	N/A
1956	The Socreds, led by Premier Bennett, are re-elected over the CCF (led by Robert Strachan) and the Liberals (led by Arthur Laing). The Progressive Conservatives lose their only seat in the legislature.	39	10	2	–	1	52	N/A
1960	The Socreds, led by Premier Bennett, are re-elected over the CCF (led by Strachan) and the Liberals (led by Ray Perrault).	32	16	4	–	–	52	N/A
1963	The Socreds, led by Premier Bennett, are re-elected over the New Democratic Party (formerly the CCF, led by Strachan) and the Liberals (led by Perrault).	33	14	5	–	–	52	N/A
1966	The Socreds, led by Premier Bennett, are re-elected over the NDP (led by Strachan) and the Liberals (led by Perrault).	33	16	6	–	–	55	N/A
1969	The Socreds, led by Premier Bennett, are re-elected over the NDP (led by Thomas Berger) and the Liberals (led by Pat McGeer).	38	12	5	–	–	55	N/A
1972	The NDP, led by Dave Barrett, win election. The Socreds, under Bennett, form the Opposition. The Liberals (led by David Anderson) come third, while the Progressive Conservatives (led by Derril Thomas Warren, who personally does not win a seat) return to the legislature.	38	10	5	2	–	55	N/A
1975	The Socreds, under new leader Bill Bennett, defeat the NDP, led by Premier Barrett.	35	18	1	1	–	55	N/A
1979	The Socreds, led by Premier Bennett, are re-elected, defeating the NDP led by Barrett. Both the Liberals and Progressive Conservatives are shut out of the legislature.	31	26	–	–	–	57	N/A
1983	The Socreds, led by Premier Bennett, are re-elected, defeating the NDP led by Barrett.	35	22	–	–	–	57	70.5%
1986	The Socreds, led by Premier Bill Vander Zalm, win re-election over the NDP led by Bob Skelly.	47	22	–	–	–	69	65.8%
1991	The NDP, led by Mike Harcourt, are elected. The Liberals (under Gordon Wilson) return to the legislature and form the Opposition, while the Socreds (under Premier Rita Johnston) fall to third.	51	17	7	–	–	75	64.03%
1996	The NDP, now led by Glen Clark, is narrowly re-elected over the Liberals, now led by Gordon Campbell. The Reform Party, led by Jack Weisgerber, wins two seats, and Gordon Wilson's Progressive Democratic Alliance wins one. The once-dominant Social Credit Party disappears from the legislature.	39	33	2	–	1	75	59.11%
2001	The Liberals, led by Gordon Campbell, win a landslide victory, nearly shutting the NDP (under Premier Ujjal Dosanjh) out of the legislature.	77	2	–	–	–	79	55.44%
2005	The Liberals, led by Premier Campbell, are re-elected, defeating the NDP under Carole James.	46	33	–	–	–	79	57.8%
2009	The Liberals, led by Premier Campbell, are re-elected, defeating the NDP under James.	49	35	–	–	1	85	50.99%
2013	The Liberals, led by Premier Christy Clark, are re-elected, defeating the NDP under Adrian Dix. The Green Party, led by Jane Sterk (who does not personally win a seat), wins its first seat.	49	34	1	–	1	85	55.32%
2017	The Liberals, led by Clark, win a narrow plurality of seats over the NDP, led by John Horgan; the Greens under Andrew Weaver hold the balance of power. The Liberals initially form a minority government but are soon replaced by the NDP under a confidence-and-supply deal with the Greens.	43	41	3	–	–	87	61.2%
2017	The Liberals, led by Clark, win a narrow plurality of seats over the NDP, led by John Horgan; the Greens under Andrew Weaver hold the balance of power. The Liberals initially form a minority government but are soon replaced by the NDP under a confidence-and-supply deal with the Greens.	41	43	3	–	–	87	61.2%
2020	The NDP, led by Premier Horgan, are re-elected with a majority government, defeating the Liberals under Andrew Wilkinson.	57	28	2	–	–	87	54.5%
2024	The NDP, led by David Eby, win a reduced majority after the BC United party (formerly the BC Liberal party) suspends its campaign and backs the BC Conservative Party.	47	44	2	–	–	93	58.4%
2026	Premier Eby calls a snap provincial election while the Conservatives experience internal party turmoil under the leadership of Kerry-Lynne Findlay.	64	27	2	–	–	93	48.14%

== Results by party ==
Party	Most seats	Highest seat %	Most votes	Highest vote %	Elections won
Conservative	63 (2026, 1st)	92.9% (1912)	910,180 (2024, 2nd)	59.65% (1912)	6
Green	3 (2017, 3rd)	3.4% (2017, 3rd)	332,387 (2017, 3rd)	16.84% (2017, 3rd)	0
Liberal	77 (2001)	97.5% (2001)	916,888 (2001)	57.62% (2001)	11 (Note: This includes the 2017 election, as the Liberals won the most seats.)
New Democratic	57 (2020)	68.0% (1991)	943,915 (2024)	47.70% (2020)	5 (Note: This does not include the 2017 election, as the Liberals won the most seats.)
Social Credit	47 (1986)	75% (1956)	954,516 (1986)	49.76% (1983)	11
Socialist	3 (1907)	7.1 (1907)	11,665 (1909, 2nd)	11.50% (1909, 2nd)	0

== See also ==
- List of premiers of British Columbia
- List of political parties in British Columbia
- List of British Columbia by-elections
- Timeline of Canadian elections

== Bibliography ==
- "Electoral History of BC". Elections BC. Office of the Legislature of British Columbia. May 9, 2008.
- "Electoral History of British Columbia 1871–1986" (PDF). Elections British Columbia. Victoria: Queen's Printer for British Columbia. 1988.
- "Electoral History of British Columbia Supplement, 1987–2001" (PDF). Legislative Library, British Columbia. Victoria: Queen's Printer for British Columbia. 2002.
- "Electoral History of British Columbia Supplement 2002–2013" (PDF). Elections BC and the Legislative Library of British Columbia. Victoria, B.C. 2014.
