= 1785 New Brunswick general election =

British colonial election in present-day Canada

The 1785 New Brunswick general election took place on November 7, 1785 to select 26 members to the 1st New Brunswick Legislature. Under the decision of Governor Thomas Carleton, the ability to vote was given to white men who were at least 21 years old or older and had lived in the province for three months. Candidates were chosen by voters according to their personal characteristics, as political parties had not existed at the time.

The election was established on October 15, 1785, in a writ issued by Carleton. The election results were posted on January 12, 1786, in Saint John, resulting in protests.
