= List of Newfoundland and Labrador general elections =

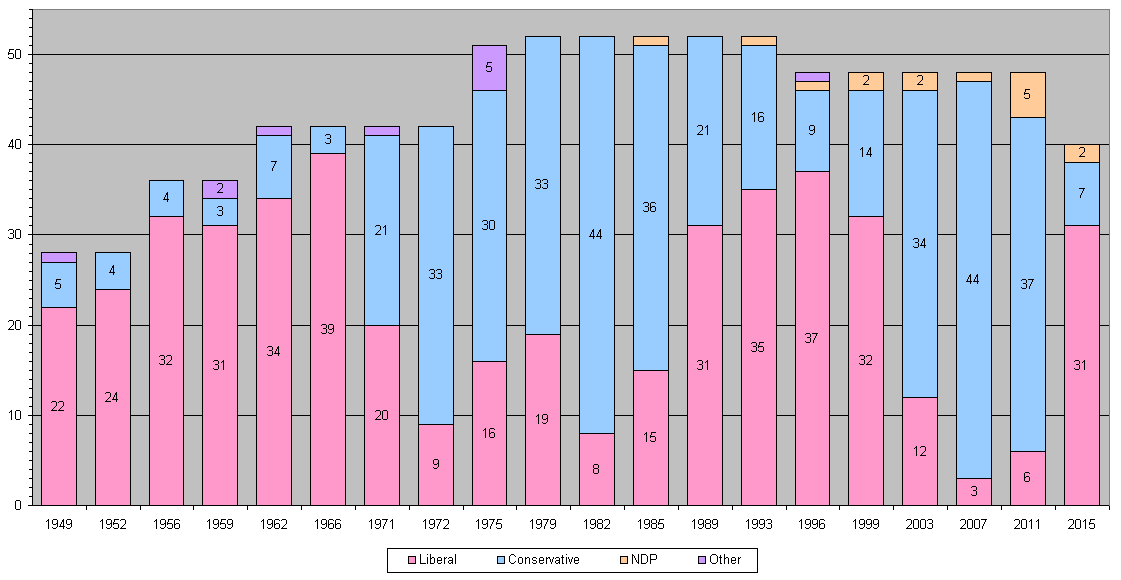
Number of seats won by major parties at each election: Conservative / PC / Liberal / NDP / Other / Independent

This article provides a summary of results for the general elections to the Canadian province of Newfoundland and Labrador's unicameral legislative body, the Newfoundland and Labrador House of Assembly. The number of seats has varied over time, from a low of twenty-seven for the first election in 1949, to a high of fifty-two during the 1980s and early 1990s. There are currently 40 seats in the house.

The chart on the right shows the information graphically, with the most recent elections on the right. It shows that politics in Newfoundland and Labrador have been dominated by two parties: the Liberal party (red) and the Conservative party (blue). The Liberal party have won ten out of the seventeen elections held.

This article only covers elections since the province became part of the Canadian Confederation in 1949. It was then named Newfoundland, and its official name changed to Newfoundland and Labrador in 2001. Prior to becoming part of Canada, Newfoundland was a British dominion, and the Newfoundland House of Assembly (as it was known before 2001) was first formed in 1832. For elections prior to 1949, see General elections in Newfoundland (pre-Confederation).

== Summary ==
The table below shows the total number of seats won by the major political parties at each election. It also shows the percentage of the vote obtained by the major political parties at each election, if greater than 0.1%. The winning party's totals are shown in bold. To date, there has only been one election (in 1989) where the party that formed the government did not have the largest share of the vote. Full details on any election are linked via the number of the election at the start of the row.

Election		Total seats	Liberal		PC^{[A]}		NDP^{[B]}		Other
Election		Total seats	Vote (%)	Seats	Vote (%)	Seats	Vote (%)	Seats	Vote (%)	Seats	Seat-winning party
30th	May 27, 1949	28	**65.5**	**22**	32.9	5			1.6	1	Independent
31st	November 26, 1951	28	**63.6**	**24**	35.6	4			0.8
32nd	October 2, 1956	36	**66.3**	**32**	32.0	4			1.7
33rd	August 20, 1959	36	**58.0**	**31**	25.3	3	7.2		9.5^{[C]}	2	United Newfoundland
34th	November 19, 1962	42	**58.7**	**34**	36.6	7	3.6		1.1	1	Independent
35th	September 8, 1966	42	**61.8**	**39**	34.0	3	1.8		2.4
36th	October 28, 1971	42	44.4	20	**51.3**	**21**	1.8		2.5^{[D]}	1	Labrador Party
37th	March 24, 1972	42	37.2	9	**60.5**	**33**	^{[E]}		2.7^{[F]}
38th	September 16, 1975	51	37.1	16	**45.5**	**30**	4.0		13.4^{[G]}	5	Reform Liberal
39th	June 18, 1979	52	40.6	19	**50.4**	**33**	7.8		1.2
40th	April 6, 1982	52	34.9	8	**61.2**	**44**	3.7		0.2
41st	April 2, 1985	52	36.7	15	**48.6**	**36**	14.4	1	0.3
42nd	April 20, 1989	52	**47.2**	**31**	47.6	21	4.4		0.8
43rd	May 3, 1993	52	**49.1**	**35**	42.1	16	7.4	1	1.4
44th	February 22, 1996	48	**55.1**	**37**	38.7	9	4.5	1	1.7	1	Independent
45th	February 9, 1999	48	**49.5**	**32**	40.6	14	8.2	2	1.4^{[H]}
46th	October 21, 2003	48	33.2	12	**58.7**	**34**	6.9	2	1.2
47th	October 9, 2007	48	22.0	3	**69.6**	**44**	8.2	1	0.2
48th	October 11, 2011	48	19.1	6	**56.1**	**37**	24.6	5	0.2
49th	November 30, 2015	40	**57.2**	**31**	30.1	7	12.1	2	0.7
50th	May 17, 2019	40	**43.9**	**20**	42.6	15	6.3	3	4.6	2	Independent
51st	March 25, 2021	40	**48.2**	**22**	38.8	13	8.0	2	4.6	3	Independent
52nd	October 14, 2025	40	43.4	15	**44.4**	**21**	8.3	2	3.9	2	Independent

=== Notes ===
^{A} Includes results for Progressive Conservatives.
^{B} Includes results for Co-operative Commonwealth Federation prior to 1963.
^{C} Includes 8.2% for the United Newfoundland Party.
^{D} Includes 2.4% for the Labrador Party.
^{E} Captured less than 1% of the vote. Its vote total is included in the "other" vote share.
^{F} Includes 1.2% for the Labrador Party.
^{G} Includes 11.9% for the Reform Liberal Party.
^{H} Includes 1.0% for the Newfoundland and Labrador Party

== See also ==
- List of political parties in Newfoundland and Labrador
- General elections in Newfoundland (pre-Confederation)
