= Ontario general elections =

Canadian provincial elections

Ontario general elections (more commonly and colloquially referred to as Ontario provincial elections) are held for the purpose of determining the government of the province of Ontario, the most populous subnational jurisdiction in Canada through democratic means. A general election was most recently held in February 2025, through which the incumbent Progressive Conservative government led by Premier Doug Ford was re-elected with its third majority mandate.

Like other Westminster-style parliamentary governments, Ontario voters exercise their democratic franchise indirectly by electing local representatives, known as Members of Provincial Parliament (MPPs), to the Legislative Assembly of Ontario, via plurality voting (or the "first-past-the-post" system). All Canadian citizens age eighteen or above who resides in Ontario are entitled to vote in elections held for the electoral district they reside in. Post-secondary students temporary residing elsewhere for school may opt to exercise that right in the electoral district of their temporary residence. Former residents of Ontario may also be entitle to vote if they meet specific criteria.

The head of Ontario's government, the Premier of Ontario, is typically the MPP that leads political party with the most seats in the legislature. They are normally "elected" by virtue of being the leader of the political party with a majority of the seats in the legislature, or had secured the needed support from other parties to command the confidence of the legislature.

The province is divided into electoral districts, colloquially known as ridings, primarily but not exclusively, by population distribution. Since the 1926 election, each electoral district elect one MPP to occupy a "seat" at Queen's Park, the moniker for the legislature due to its physical location in said park in Downtown Toronto. There are currently 124 seats at Queen's Park. The number of seats has varied over time, from 82 for the first election in 1867, to a high of 130 in the late 1980s and early 1990s.

Ontario provincial elections are held on Thursdays. Section 4 of the Canadian Charter of Rights and Freedom requires that provincial general election be held no later than five years after the previous election. Since the end of World War II, elections are usually held every three or four years. Fixed date election law adopted in 2003 further regulate timing of Ontario general election until they were repealed in late 2025 by the Ford government.

Year	Ontario elections - Share of seats	Total
2025		124
2022		124
2018		124
2014		107
2011		107
2007		107
2003		103
1999		103
1995		130
1990		130
1987		130
1985		125
1981		125
1977		125
1975		125
1971		117
1967		117
1963		108
1959		98
1955		98
1951		90
1948		90
1945		90
1943		90
1937		90
1934		90
1929		112
1926		112
1923		111
1919		111
1883		111
1911		106
1908		106
1905		98
1902		98
1898		94
1894		94
1890		91
1886		90
1883		88
1879		88
1875		88
1871		82
1867		82
	Liberal (Note: Inclusive of members elected as Independent Libearl, Liberal-Labour); Progressive (Note: Inclusive of members elected as Independent Progressive)/UFO; Green Labour; Independent / Conservative (Note: Inclusive of members elected as Independent Conservative)/PC; NDP CCF; Labour–Progressive; Other

== History ==
=== Before Confederation ===
Since its formal formation at Canadian confederation in 1867, Ontario has held forty-four general elections. Elections for local legislative assembly members however started a few decades earlier. Soon after Upper Canada was made a separate British Colony from the British Province of Quebec, the first election for the Legislative Assembly of Upper Canada was held in 1792. Upper Canada held thirteen elections between 1792 and 1836 before being merged back with Lower Canada to form the Province of Canada in 1840. Eight elections were held between 1841 and 1863 to elect members to its Legislative Assembly.

However, some of the earlier elections were not determinant of the colonial government of the day. The first election that meaningfully determine the executive leadership of the colonial government was held in 1848, when the principle of responsible government was formally implemented in the Province of Canada.

=== Evolution of election procedure and eligibility ===
Ontario held its first provincial election, then called "local election", in conjunction with Canada's first federal election, then called "dominion election" in late summer of 1867. The election was held on different days in different districts over August and September. Balloting was not done in secret, but was recorded orally in front of election officials and representatives of candidates. Candidates were allowed to run for and to hold seats in the Canadian Parliament and the Ontario legislature simultaneously, or to contest multiple districts in the same election. A number of prominent political figures were members of both the first Canadian parliament and the first Ontario parliament. Though only one person, Liberal Premier Edward Blake, had ever been returned to the legislature by more than one district in a Ontario general election. (Note: In the 1871 election, Edward Blake was re-elected in Bruce South, while being elected by acclamation in Durham West, the district for which he was the MP. The double return weakened Blake's hand during his ultimately successful bid in ousting incumbent Premier John Sandfield Macdonald.)

To be eligible to vote, one must be a male British subject twenty-one or older. A voter must meet a property qualification of being an owner or tenant with a property valued with a certain minimum value (Note: The value of property required to be eligible to vote for a member of parliament is listed as $200 in an urban area and $100 in a rural area by Elections Canada's A History of the Vote in Canada, however that number provided in the publication is a general amount for the period from 1867 to 1885 before federal law was passed governing franchise.), and an urban voter must further meet an annual income requirement. An estimated 16.5% of Ontario 1.6 million residents were eligible to vote in the first election.

Election laws received a great deal of attention from Ontario political leaders in the early years of the provinces, and improvements were made rapidly. By the second election held in 1871, elections in all electoral district were held on the same day. By the third election held in 1875, Ontario elections were conducted with secret ballots.

By the end of 1872, it was no longer possible for an individual to be an MP and MPP simultaneously, though one could be a candidate in multiple electoral districts for many more decades. While few people have done so in the twentieth century, it remained technically possible and lawful for an individual to stand for elections in multiple districts in Ontario until 1984.

Voting franchise in Ontario elections was expanded to include women in 1917. Their eligibility to stand for office in the subsequent election however remained uncertain in absence of specific legislation until Edwards v Canada (AG) (the Persons Case launch by the Famous Five) was decided in 1929. In the final legislative sittings month prior to the 1919 election, the Women's Assembly Qualification Act, 1919 was enacted to specifically state that women were qualified to be elected to the Legislative Assembly. Liberal Henrietta Bundy Independent Justerna Sears contested that year's election, but it would be more than 20 years later when a woman was elected to the legislature.

== List of general elections ==
Year	Total seats	Premier following election	Govt	Conservative (Note: Inclusive of seats/votes won by candidates contested as Liberal-Conservative (1930s or earlier) and Independent Conservatives; tally for Progressive Conservatives from 1943 onward)		Liberal (Note: Inclusive of seats/votes won by candidates contested as Independent Liberals)		NDP / CCF (Note: 1934 to 1959 figures are for CCF (Co-operative Commonwealth Federation (Ontario Section)); 1961 onward are for NDP. Labour Party votes and seats are not included in this column after 1926.)		UFO/Labour Progressive (Note: Figures for 1955 or earlier inclusive of all seats/votes won by candidates of Labour Party, United Farmers, Progressive Party, Labour-Progressive/Communist Party, Soldiers and other affiliated allies. Candidates contested as Progressive-Liberal or Liberal-Progessive are each specifically assigned based on context.) Green *		Ind.	Other		Note
	#	Premier following election	%	#	%	#	%	#	%	#	%	#	Pty	#	
1867	82	John Sandfield Macdonald	50.0	41	50.3	41	48.8	-		-		-	-		
1871	82	Edward Blake	52.4	39	46.7	43	52.3	-		-		-	-		
1875	88	Sir Oliver Mowat	58.0	37	48.3	51	48.1	-		-		-	-		
1879	88	Sir Oliver Mowat	64.8	31	48.7	57	48.1	-		-		-	-		
1883	88	Sir Oliver Mowat	56.8	37	47.5	50	49.4	-		-	1.5	1	-		(Note: Independent elected, Mr. William Lees of South Lanark, won as an Ind. Conservative in 1879 and as a Conservative in 1886.)
1886	90	Sir Oliver Mowat	63.3	32	47.1	57	48.4	-		-	3.9	1	-		(Note: Independent elected was Samuel Armstrong, the inaugural member for Parry Sound)
1890	91	Sir Oliver Mowat	60.4	36	47.9	55	51.1	-		-		-	-		(Note: Conservative and Liberal results included their candidates who were campaigning with the endorsements of Equal Rights Party)
1894	94	Sir Oliver Mowat	62.8	32	41.0	59	53.2	-		-	0.5	-	Patrons	3	(Note: Conservative and Liberal results included their candidates who were endorsed by Patrons of Industry or Protestant Protective Association (PPA) and campaigned under joint banners. Three members were elected solely under Patrons banner.)
1898	94	Arthur Hardy	54.3	43	48.1	51	47.3	-		-		-	-		
1902	98	Sir George Ross	51.0	48	50.0	50	47.5	-		-		-	-		
1905	98	Sir James Whitney	71.4	70	53.1	28	46.1	-		-		-	-		
1908	106	Sir James Whitney	81.1	86	54.7	19	40.0	-		1	1.7	-	-		(Note: One Labour member, and votes for all Labour and Progressive candidates recorded under UFO.)
1911	106	Sir James Whitney	78.3	83	57.3	22	38.5	-		1	2.4	-	-		
1914	111	Sir James Whitney	75.7	84	55.3	26	38.6	-		1	1.3	-	-		
1919	111	Ernest Drury	51.4	25	34.6	29	27.3	-		56	33.1	-	Soldier	1	(Note: 56 elected members under UFO/Prog. consisted of 45 United Farmers and 11 Labour members)
1923	111	Howard Ferguson	67.6	75	49.8	14	20.3	-		21	26.9	1	-		(Note: 21 elected members under UFO/Prog. consisted of 17 United Farmers and 4 Labour members. The one independent defeated the official Liberal candidate, sat with the Liberals, and ran as an Independent Liberals in subsequent elections.)
1926	112	Howard Ferguson	66.1	74	57.6	19	24.5	-		15	9.4	-	Lib-Prog	4	(Note: 15 elected members under UFO/Prog. consisted of 11 Progressive, 3 United Farmers and 1 Labour members. The one Labour members joined the Conservative soon after parliament convened.) (Note: Liberal-Progressive was neither a party nor a caucus, but a campaign label for candidates jointly endorsed by local associations of the two parties. Of the four elected, two were Liberals, and two were Progressives, and they sat with their caucus accordingly. See 17th Parliament for more info.)
1929	112	Howard Ferguson	82.1	92	58.8	14	32.8	-		6	5.8	-	-		(Note: 6 elected members under UFO/Prog. consisted of 4 Progressive, 1 United Farmers and 1 Labour members.)
1934	90	Mitchell Hepburn	76.7	17	39.8	69	50.4	1	7.0	2	1.6	1	-		(Note: 2 elected members under UFO/Prog. consisted of 1 United Farmers and 1 Labour members. Other former Progressive caucus members who contested election did so as Liberal-Progressive candidates, and some joined the Liberal cabinet immediately upon its formation.)
1937	90	Mitchell Hepburn	73.3	23	40.0	66	51.9	-	5.3	1	2.4	-	-		(Note: 1 elected member under UFO/Prog. was UFO member Farquhar Oliver, who formally joined the Liberal Party and the Hepburn ministry in 1941.)
1943	90	George A. Drew	42.2	38	35.7	16	31.2	34	31.7	2	1.1	-	-		(Note: Elected member under UFO/Prog. were members of the Labour-Progressive Party, a successor organization of the Communist Party after it was bamnned during the war.)
1945	90	George A. Drew	73.3	66	44.2	14	29.8	8	22.4	2	2.8	-	-		
1948	90	George A. Drew	58.9	53	41.5	14	29.8	21	27.0	2	1.0	-	-		
1951	90	Leslie Frost	87.8	79	44.3	8	31.5	2	19.1	1	0.7	-	-		
1955	98	Leslie Frost	85.7	84	48.5	11	33.3	3	16.5	-	1.2	-	-		
1959	98	Leslie Frost	72.4	71	46.3	22	36.6	5	16.7	-		-	-		
1963	108	John Robarts	71.3	77	48.9	24	35.1	7	15.5	-		-	-		
1967	117	John Robarts	59.0	69	42.1	28	31.7	20	25.9	-		-	-		
1971	117	Bill Davis	66.7	78	44.5	20	27.8	19	27.1	-		-	-		
1975	125	Bill Davis	40.8	51	36.1	36	34.3	38	28.9	-		-	-		
1977	125	Bill Davis	46.4	58	39.6	34	31.4	33	28.2	-		-	-		
1981	125	Bill Davis	56.0	70	44.4	34	33.7	21	21.2	-		-	-		
1985	125	David Peterson	38.4	52	36.9	48	37.9	25	23.8	-		-	-		(Note: The Progressive Conservative Party won the most seats but was unable to secure the confidence of the new legislature. The Liberal Party and the NDP entered into a 2-year supply and confidence agreement, enabling the Liberals to form government.)
1987	130	David Peterson	73.1	16	24.7	95	47.3	19	25.7	-		-	-		
1990	130	Bob Rae	56.9	20	23.5	36	32.4	74	37.6	-		-	-		
1995	130	Mike Harris	63.1	82	45.0	30	31.1	17	20.5	-		1	-		
1999	103	Mike Harris	57.3	59	45.1	35	39.9	9	12.6	-		-	-		
2003	103	Dalton McGuinty	69.9	24	34.7	72	46.4	7	14.7	-	2.8	-	-		
2007	107	Dalton McGuinty	66.4	26	31.6	71	42.3	10	16.8	-	8.0	-	-		
2011	107	Dalton McGuinty	49.5	37	35.4	53	37.6	17	22.6	-	2.9	-	-		
2014	107	Kathleen Wynne	54.2	28	31.2	58	38.7	21	23.7	1	4.6	-	-		
2018	124	Doug Ford	61.3	76	40.5	7	19.6	40	33.6	1	4.6	-	-		
2022	124	Doug Ford	66.9	83	40.8	8	23.9	31	23.7	1	6.0	1	-		
2025	124	Doug Ford	64.5	80	43.0	14	30.0	27	18.6	2	4.8	1	-		
Year	Total seats	Premier following election	%	MPPs	V's %	MPPs	V's %	MPPs	V's %	MPPs	V's %	MPPs	Party	MPPs	Note
Year	Total seats	Premier following election	%										Other		Note
Year	Total seats	Premier following election	%	Progressive Conservative		Liberal		NDP *		Green *		Ind.	Other		Note

== See also ==
- Timeline of Canadian elections
- List of political parties in Ontario
- List of Ontario by-elections

== Sources ==
- Elections Canada (2021). A History of the Vote in Canada (PDF) (Third ed.). Gatineau, Quebec: Elections Canada. ISBN 978-0-660-37056-9.
- Garner, John (1969). The Franchise and Politics in British North America, 1755-1867. Ottawa: University of Toronto Press. ISBN 978-0-8020-3219-5.
- LeDuc, Lawrence; Pammett, Jon H.; McKenzie, Judith L.; Turcotte, André (2010). Dynasties and Interludes: Past and Present in Canadian Electoral Politics. Toronto: Dundurn Press. ISBN 978-1-55488-886-3.
- "Composition Of Legislature Following Ontario General Elections (1867 - 1902)". Elections Ontario. Government of Ontario. Archived from the original on 2010-12-10.
- "Composition Of Legislature Following Ontario General Elections (1905 - 1937)". Elections Ontario. Archived from the original on 2007-06-18.
- "Composition Of Legislature Following Ontario General Elections (1943 - 1975)". Elections Ontario. Archived from the original on 2007-06-18.
- "Composition Of Legislature Following Ontario General Elections (1977 - 2003)". Elections Ontario. Archived from the original on 2007-06-18.
