= 1899 New Brunswick general election =

Canadian provincial election

The 1899 New Brunswick general election was held on 18 February 1899, to elect 46 members to the 30th New Brunswick Legislative Assembly, the governing house of the province of New Brunswick, Canada. The election was held before the adoption of party labels.

Of forty-six MLAs, forty supported the government, four formed the opposition, and the other two were neutral. The government of Henry Emmerson was re-elected.

New Brunswick general election, 1899
Party	Leader	Seats
Government (Liberal)	Henry Emmerson	40
Opposition (Conservative)	Alfred Augustus Stockton	4
Neutral		2
