= 1917 New Brunswick general election =

Canadian provincial election

The 1917 New Brunswick general election was held on 24 February 1917, to elect 48 members to the 34th New Brunswick Legislative Assembly, the governing house of the province of New Brunswick, Canada. Although political parties had no standing in law, the twenty-one MLAs that formed the government declared themselves to be Conservatives, while the twenty-seven opposition MLAs declared themselves to be Liberals.

The incumbent Conservative government, under newly appointed leader James Alexander Murray, the third Conservative Premier since the previous election, was defeated after having been embroiled in several years of financial scandals.

New Brunswick general election, 1917
Party	Leader	Seats
Opposition (Liberal)	Walter Edward Foster	27
Government (Conservative)	James Alexander Murray	21
