= 1878 New Brunswick general election =

Canadian provincial election

The 1878 New Brunswick general election was held in June 1878, to elect 41 members to the Post-Confederation 24th New Brunswick Legislative Assembly, the governing house of the province of New Brunswick, Canada. The election was held before the adoption of party labels. John James Fraser was appointed premier of New Brunswick on May 4, 1878, following the resignation of George Edwin King, and led his government into the election weeks later.

Of forty-one MLAs (members of the Legislative Assembly), thirty-one were in support of the government, and ten formed the opposition.

== Results ==
New Brunswick general election, 1878
Party	Leader	Seats
Government	John James Fraser	31
Opposition		10
Total	N/A	41
