= 1920 New Brunswick general election =

Canadian provincial election

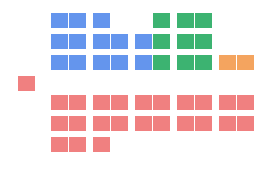
Rendition of party representation in the 35th New Brunswick Legislative Assembly decided by this election. Liberals (24) Conservatives (13) United Farmers (9) Labour (2)

The 1920 New Brunswick general election was held on 9 October 1920, to elect 48 members to the 35th New Brunswick Legislative Assembly, the governing house of the province of New Brunswick, Canada. Although political parties had no standing in law, twenty-four MLA declared themselves to be Liberals, thirteen declared themselves to be Conservatives, nine declared themselves to members of the United Farmers, and two declared themselves Farmer-Labour.

The election resulted in the first minority government in New Brunswick since the advent of responsible government in the 1840s.

This was the first general election in which women could vote. They would not be allowed to run for office until 1934, following the 1919 act to extend the franchise to women.

New Brunswick general election, 1920
| Party | Leader | Seats |
|---|---|---|
| Government (Liberal) | Walter Edward Foster | 24 |
| Opposition (Conservative) | John Babington Macaulay Baxter | 13 |
| Opposition (United Farmers) | | 9 |
| Opposition (Farmer-Labour) | | 2 |

Seats summary
| Liberal | 50.00% |
| Conservative | 27.08% |
| United Farmers | 18.75% |
| Farmer-Labour | 4.17% |
