= 1912 New Brunswick general election =

Canadian provincial election

The 1912 New Brunswick general election was held on 20 June 1912, to elect 48 members to the 33rd New Brunswick Legislative Assembly, the governing house of the province of New Brunswick, Canada. The election was held before the adoption of party labels.

Of forty-eight MLAs, forty-four supported the government, two formed the opposition, and the other two were neutral independent Conservatives. The government of James Kidd Flemming was re-elected.

New Brunswick general election, 1912
Party	Leader	Seats
Government (Conservative)	James Kidd Flemming	44
Opposition (Liberal)	Arthur Bliss Copp	2
Neutral (Ind. Conservative)		2
