= 1882 New Brunswick general election =

Canadian provincial election

The 1882 New Brunswick general election was held in June 1882, to elect 41 members to the 25th New Brunswick Legislative Assembly, the governing house of the province of New Brunswick, Canada. The election was held before the adoption of party labels.

Of forty-one MLAs, twenty-two supported the government, eighteen formed the opposition, and one was neutral. However, during the legislative session leader of the opposition Andrew George Blair was able to win enough support from MLAs to defeat the government of Daniel Lionel Hanington in a non-confidence vote and form a government led by the Liberal Party which had coalesced under Blair's leadership.

New Brunswick general election, 1882
Party	Leader	Seats
Government	Daniel Lionel Hanington	22
Opposition (Liberal)	Andrew George Blair	18
Neutral		1
