= 1908 New Brunswick general election =

Canadian provincial election

The 1908 New Brunswick general election was held on 3 March 1908, to elect 46 members to the 32nd New Brunswick Legislative Assembly, the governing house of the province of New Brunswick, Canada. The election was held before the adoption of party labels.

Of forty-six MLAs, twelve supported the government, thirty-one formed the opposition, and the other two were neutral. The incumbent government of Clifford William Robinson was defeated ousting the Liberals who had been in power since 1883.

New Brunswick general election, 1908
| Party | Leader | Seats |
|---|---|---|
| Opposition (Conservative) | John Douglas Hazen | 31 |
| Government (Liberal) | Clifford William Robinson | 12 |
| Neutral | | 2 |
