= 1866 New Brunswick general election =

British colonial election in present-day Canada

The 1866 New Brunswick general election was held in May and June 1866 to elect 41 members to the 21st New Brunswick Legislative Assembly. This was the 21st general election for the British colony of New Brunswick, but is considered the 1st general election for the Canadian province of New Brunswick as New Brunswick joined Canadian Confederation on July 1, 1867, during the life of the Legislative Assembly.

Of forty-one MLAs, thirty-three were confederationalists, supporting confederation, and eight were constitutionalists, opposed to confederation, who formed the opposition.

== History ==
A riot in Saint John during the 1866 election caused the death of one person.

== Results ==
New Brunswick general election, 1866
Party	Leader	Seats
Government (confederationalists)	Peter Mitchell	33
Opposition (constitutionalists)	Albert James Smith	8
