= 1870 New Brunswick general election =

Canadian provincial election

The 1870 New Brunswick general election was held in June and July 1870, to elect 41 members to the 22nd New Brunswick Legislative Assembly, the governing house of the province of New Brunswick, Canada. The election was held before the adoption of party labels, and was the first since New Brunswick joined the Canadian Confederation in 1867. The elections saw tension between protestants and Catholics over a bill to end public funding of separate religious schools.

The government, a loose coalition of Conservatives and Liberals, was led into the election by George Edwin King weeks after he had been appointed premier following the resignation of Andrew Rainsford Wetmore. King's government was re-elected, but he would resign three days into the legislative session, and a new coalition government was formed by George Luther Hatheway(an Opposition MLA) which included King as Attorney-General.

Of forty-one MLAs, twenty-four supported the government, sixteen formed the opposition, and one was neutral.

New Brunswick general election, 1870
| Party | Leader | Seats |
|---|---|---|
| Government (coalition) | George Edwin King | 24 |
| Opposition | | 16 |
| Neutral | | 1 |
