= Commander of NORAD =

Military commander

The commander of North American Aerospace Defense Command (NORAD) is a four-star general or admiral in the United States Armed Forces who serves as the head of all United States and Canadian joint aerospace military operational forces, stationed within the North American territories. The commander of NORAD concurrently serves as the commander of United States Northern Command and is the head of all U.S. military forces within the command's geographical area of responsibility. The commander of NORAD is nominated for appointment by the President of the United States and must be confirmed by the United States Senate. Prior to 2001, the title for the commander of NORAD was called the Commander-in-Chief of the North American Aerospace Defense Command. The commander of NORAD typically serves for two years.

No.	Commander		Term			Service branch
No.	Portrait	Name	Took office	Left office	Term length	Service branch
1	Earle E. Partridge	General; Earle E. Partridge (1900–1990)	12 September 1957	30 July 1959	1 year, 321 days	U.S. Air Force
2	Laurence S. Kuter	General; Laurence S. Kuter (1905–1979)	1 August 1959	30 July 1962	2 years, 363 days	U.S. Air Force
3	John K. Gerhart	General; John K. Gerhart (1907–1981)	1 August 1962	30 March 1965	2 years, 241 days	U.S. Air Force
4	Dean C. Strother	General; Dean C. Strother (1908–2000)	1 April 1965	29 July 1966	1 year, 119 days	U.S. Air Force
5	Raymond J. Reeves	General; Raymond J. Reeves (1909–1998)	1 August 1966	31 July 1969	2 years, 364 days	U.S. Air Force
6	Seth J. McKee	General; Seth J. McKee (1916–2016)	1 August 1969	30 September 1973	4 years, 60 days	U.S. Air Force
7	Lucius D. Clay Jr.	General; Lucius D. Clay Jr. (1919–1994)	1 October 1973	29 August 1975	1 year, 332 days	U.S. Air Force
8	Daniel James Jr.	General; Daniel James Jr. (1920–1978)	1 September 1975	5 December 1977	2 years, 95 days	U.S. Air Force
9	James E. Hill	General; James E. Hill (1921–1999)	6 December 1977	31 December 1979	2 years, 25 days	U.S. Air Force
10	James V. Hartinger	General; James V. Hartinger (1925–2000)	1 January 1980	30 July 1984	4 years, 211 days	U.S. Air Force
11	Robert T. Herres	General; Robert T. Herres (1932–2008)	30 July 1984	5 February 1987	2 years, 190 days	U.S. Air Force
12	John L. Piotrowski	General; John L. Piotrowski (born 1934)	6 February 1987	30 March 1990	3 years, 52 days	U.S. Air Force
13	Donald J. Kutyna	General; Donald J. Kutyna (born 1933)	1 April 1990	30 June 1992	2 years, 90 days	U.S. Air Force
14	Charles A. Horner	General; Charles A. Horner (born 1936)	30 June 1992	12 September 1994	2 years, 74 days	U.S. Air Force
15	Joseph W. Ashy	General; Joseph W. Ashy (born 1940)	13 September 1994	26 August 1996	1 year, 348 days	U.S. Air Force
16	Howell M. Estes III	General; Howell M. Estes III (1941–2024)	27 August 1996	14 August 1998	1 year, 352 days	U.S. Air Force
17	Richard B. Myers	General; Richard B. Myers (born 1942)	14 August 1998	22 February 2000	1 year, 192 days	U.S. Air Force
18	Ralph E. Eberhart	General; Ralph E. Eberhart (born 1946)	22 February 2000	5 November 2004	4 years, 257 days	U.S. Air Force
19	Timothy J. Keating	Admiral; Timothy J. Keating (born 1948)	5 November 2004	23 March 2007	2 years, 138 days	U.S. Navy
20	Victor E. Renuart Jr.	General; Victor E. Renuart Jr. (born 1949)	23 March 2007	19 May 2010	3 years, 57 days	U.S. Air Force
21	James A. Winnefeld, Jr.	Admiral; James A. Winnefeld, Jr. (born 1956)	19 May 2010	3 August 2011	1 year, 76 days	U.S. Navy
22	Charles H. Jacoby Jr.	General; Charles H. Jacoby Jr. (1954–2025)	3 August 2011	5 December 2014	3 years, 124 days	U.S. Army
23	William E. Gortney	Admiral; William E. Gortney (born 1955)	5 December 2014	13 May 2016	1 year, 160 days	U.S. Navy
24	Lori J. Robinson	General; Lori J. Robinson (born 1959)	13 May 2016	24 May 2018	2 years, 11 days	U.S. Air Force
25	Terrence J. O'Shaughnessy	General; Terrence J. O'Shaughnessy (born 1964)	24 May 2018	20 August 2020	2 years, 88 days	U.S. Air Force
26	Glen D. VanHerck	General; Glen D. VanHerck (born 1962)	20 August 2020	5 February 2024	3 years, 169 days	U.S. Air Force
27	Gregory M. Guillot	General; Gregory M. Guillot	5 February 2024	Incumbent	2 years, 256 days	U.S. Air Force

== List of deputy commanders ==
In recent years deputy commanders have always been Canadian air force lieutenant generals. Prior to the 1968 unification of the Canadian Forces, the deputy commanders were RCAF Air Marshals.

No.	Commander		Term			Service branch
No.	Portrait	Name	Took office	Left office	Term length	Service branch
1	Roy Slemon, CB, CBE, CD	Air Marshal; Roy Slemon, CB, CBE, CD (1904–1992)	12 September 1957	14 August 1964	6 years, 337 days	Royal Canadian Air Force
2	Clarence Rupert Dunlap, CBE, CD	Air Marshal; Clarence Rupert Dunlap, CBE, CD (1908–2003)	15 August 1964	25 August 1967	3 years, 10 days	Royal Canadian Air Force
3	William R. MacBrien, OBE, CD	Air Marshal; William R. MacBrien, OBE, CD (1913–1986)	26 August 1967	22 January 1969	3 years, 10 days	Royal Canadian Air Force
4	Frederick R. Sharp, CMM, DFC, CD	Lieutenant-General; Frederick R. Sharp, CMM, DFC, CD (1915–1992)	23 January 1969	14 September 1969	234 days	Royal Canadian Air Force
5	Edwin Reyno, AFC, CD	Lieutenant-General; Edwin Reyno, AFC, CD (1917–1982)	15 September 1969	31 August 1972	2 years, 351 days	Royal Canadian Air Force
6	Reginald J. Lane, DSO, DFC, CD	Lieutenant-General; Reginald J. Lane, DSO, DFC, CD (1920–2003)	1 September 1972	1 October 1974	2 years, 30 days	Royal Canadian Air Force
7	Richard C. Stovel, AFC, CD	Lieutenant-General; Richard C. Stovel, AFC, CD (1920–2003)	2 October 1974	15 September 1976	1 year, 349 days	Royal Canadian Air Force
8	David R. Adamson, CMM, CD	Lieutenant-General; David R. Adamson, CMM, CD (1923–2011)	16 September 1976	17 August 1978	1 year, 335 days	Royal Canadian Air Force
9	Kenneth E. Lewis, CMM, CD	Lieutenant-General; Kenneth E. Lewis, CMM, CD (1929–1992)	18 August 1978	24 June 1980	1 year, 311 days	Royal Canadian Air Force
10	Kenneth J. Thorneycroft, CMM, CD	Lieutenant-General; Kenneth J. Thorneycroft, CMM, CD (1928–2018)	24 June 1980	25 May 1983	2 years, 335 days	Royal Canadian Air Force
11	Donald C. MacKenzie, CMM, CD	Lieutenant-General; Donald C. MacKenzie, CMM, CD (1931–2021)	26 May 1983	10 August 1986	3 years, 76 days	Royal Canadian Air Force
12	Donald M. McNaughton, CMM, CD	Lieutenant-General; Donald M. McNaughton, CMM, CD (born 1934)	11 August 1986	11 August 1989	3 years, 0 days	Royal Canadian Air Force
13	Robert W. Morton, CMM, CD	Lieutenant-General; Robert W. Morton, CMM, CD (1937–2002)	11 August 1989	2 August 1992	2 years, 357 days	Royal Canadian Air Force
14	Brian L. Smith, CMM, CD	Lieutenant-General; Brian L. Smith, CMM, CD (born 1939)	3 August 1992	1 August 1994	1 year, 363 days	Royal Canadian Air Force
15	J. D. O'Blenis, CMM, CD	Lieutenant-General; J. D. O'Blenis, CMM, CD (1940–2018)	2 August 1994	7 August 1995	1 year, 5 days	Royal Canadian Air Force
16	L.W.F. Cuppens, CMM, CD	Lieutenant-General; L.W.F. Cuppens, CMM, CD (1944–2022)	8 August 1995	7 April 1998	2 years, 242 days	Royal Canadian Air Force
17	G.E.C. Macdonald, CMM, MVO, CD	Lieutenant-General; G.E.C. Macdonald, CMM, MVO, CD (born 1950)	8 April 1998	8 August 2001	3 years, 122 days	Royal Canadian Air Force
18	Ken R. Pennie, CMM, CD	Lieutenant-General; Ken R. Pennie, CMM, CD (born 1949)	8 August 2001	14 July 2003	1 year, 340 days	Royal Canadian Air Force
19	Rick Findley, CMM, MSC, CD	Lieutenant-General; Rick Findley, CMM, MSC, CD (born 1950)	14 July 2003	2 August 2007	4 years, 19 days	Royal Canadian Air Force
20	J.J.C. Bouchard, OC, CMM, MSC, CD	Lieutenant-General; J.J.C. Bouchard, OC, CMM, MSC, CD (born 1956)	2 August 2007	10 July 2009	1 year, 342 days	Royal Canadian Air Force
21	Marcel Duval, CMM, CD	Lieutenant-General; Marcel Duval, CMM, CD (born 1950)	10 July 2009	15 August 2011	2 years, 36 days	Royal Canadian Air Force
21	Thomas J. Lawson, CMM, CD	Lieutenant-General; Thomas J. Lawson, CMM, CD (born 1957)	15 August 2011	4 September 2012	1 year, 20 days	Royal Canadian Air Force
22	J.A.J. Parent, CMM, CD	Lieutenant-General; J.A.J. Parent, CMM, CD	4 September 2012	1 July 2015	2 years, 300 days	Royal Canadian Air Force
23	J.P.J. St-Amand, CMM, CD	Lieutenant-General; J.P.J. St-Amand, CMM, CD	1 July 2015	20 July 2018	3 years, 19 days	Royal Canadian Air Force
24	Christopher J. Coates, CMM, MSM, CD	Lieutenant-General; Christopher J. Coates, CMM, MSM, CD	20 July 2018	21 July 2020	2 years, 1 day	Royal Canadian Air Force
25	Alain Pelletier, MSM, CD	Lieutenant-General; Alain Pelletier, MSM, CD	21 July 2020	2 June 2023	2 years, 316 days	Royal Canadian Air Force
26	Blaise F. Frawley, CMM, CD	Lieutenant-General; Blaise F. Frawley, CMM, CD	2 June 2023	15 July 2025	2 years, 43 days	Royal Canadian Air Force
27	Iain S. Huddleston, OMM, CD	Lieutenant-General; Iain S. Huddleston, OMM, CD	15 July 2025	Incumbent	1 year, 96 days	Royal Canadian Air Force
