= General MacKenzie (disambiguation) =

Lewis MacKenzie (born 1940) was a Canadian Army major general. General MacKenzie or Mackenzie may also refer to:

- Allan MacKenzie (1931–2012), Royal Canadian Air Force lieutenant general
- Colin Mackenzie (Indian Army officer) (1806–1881), Madras Army lieutenant general
- Colin Mackenzie (British Army officer) (1861–1956), British Army major general
- Donald C. MacKenzie (born 1931), Royal Canadian Air Force major general
- Francis Mackenzie, 1st Baron Seaforth (1754–1815), British Army lieutenant general
- George Mackenzie, 2nd Earl of Seaforth (died 1651), Scottish general of the Covenanters in the Wars of the Three Kingdoms
- Jeremy Mackenzie (born 1941), British Army general
- John Mackenzie, Lord MacLeod (1727–1789), Swedish Army lieutenant general and British Army major general
- Ranald S. Mackenzie (1840–1889), Union Army brigadier general and brevet major general
