= Larry Ashley =

Canadian air force general

- Born: 2 October 1937 (age 89); Simcoe, Ontario, Canada
- Military career
- Allegiance: Canada
- Branch: Royal Canadian Navy; Royal Canadian Air Force / Canadian Forces
- Service years: 1955–1988
- Rank: Lieutenant-General
- Commands: 406 Maritime Operational Training Squadron; 423 Maritime Helicopter Squadron; CFB Shearwater; Air Command
- Awards: Commander of the Order of Military Merit; Canadian Forces' Decoration

Lieutenant-General Larry Albert Ashley CMM, CD (born 2 October 1937) is a Canadian retired air force general who was Commander, Air Command in Canada from 1986 to 1988.

== Career ==
Ashley joined the Royal Canadian Navy in 1955 and trained as a helicopter pilot. He became Air Detachment Commander in the destroyer HMCS Iroquois in 1972, Commanding Officer of 406 Maritime Operational Training Squadron at CFB Shearwater in 1973 and Commanding Officer of 423 Maritime Helicopter Squadron Squadron at CFB Shearwater in 1974. He went on to be Senior Staff Officer Maritime Air at CFB Winnipeg in 1976, Base Commander at CFB Shearwater later that year and Director Air Requirements at the National Defence Headquarters in 1979. After that he was appointed to work on the NATO airborne early warning and control programme at Brunssuum as Chief of Military Factors in 1981 and became Chief of Air Doctrine and Operations in 1983. His last appointment was as Commander, Air Command in 1986 before retiring in 1988.

In retirement he became technical advisor to AgustaWestland.

Military offices
| Preceded by D.M. McNaughton | Commander, Air Command; 1986–1988 | Succeeded by F.R. Sutherland |
