= George Macdonald (Canadian general) =

Vice chief of Defence staff of the Canadian force

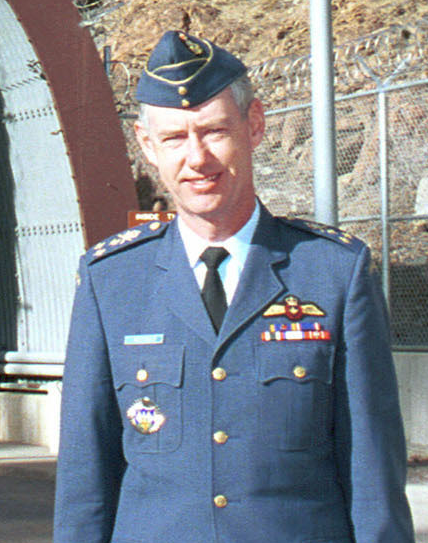
- General Macdonald
- Born: 1949 or 1950 (age 76–77)
- Military career
- Allegiance: Canada
- Branch: Air Command
- Service years: 1967 – 2004
- Rank: Lieutenant-General
- Awards: Commander of the Order of Military Merit; Canadian Forces' Decoration

Lieutenant-General George Ehelbert Cornell Macdonald CMM, CD (born c. 1950) was Vice Chief of the Defence Staff of the Canadian Forces.

== Military career ==
Educated at the University of Calgary, Macdonald joined the Canadian Forces in 1966 and served as an operational fighter pilot. He held posts in Germany and Norway. He became Deputy Commander-in-Chief of the North American Aerospace Defense Command in 1997 and Vice Chief of the Defence Staff in 2001 before retiring in 2004.

Macdonald was appointed a Member of the Royal Victorian Order in 1978.

Military offices
Preceded by L W F Cuppens	Deputy Commander of NORAD; 1998 - 2001	Succeeded by K R Pennie
Preceded by Gary Garnett	Vice Chief of the Defence Staff; 2001-2004	Succeeded by Ronald Buck
