= Ken Pennie =

Canadian general

Kenneth R. Pennie
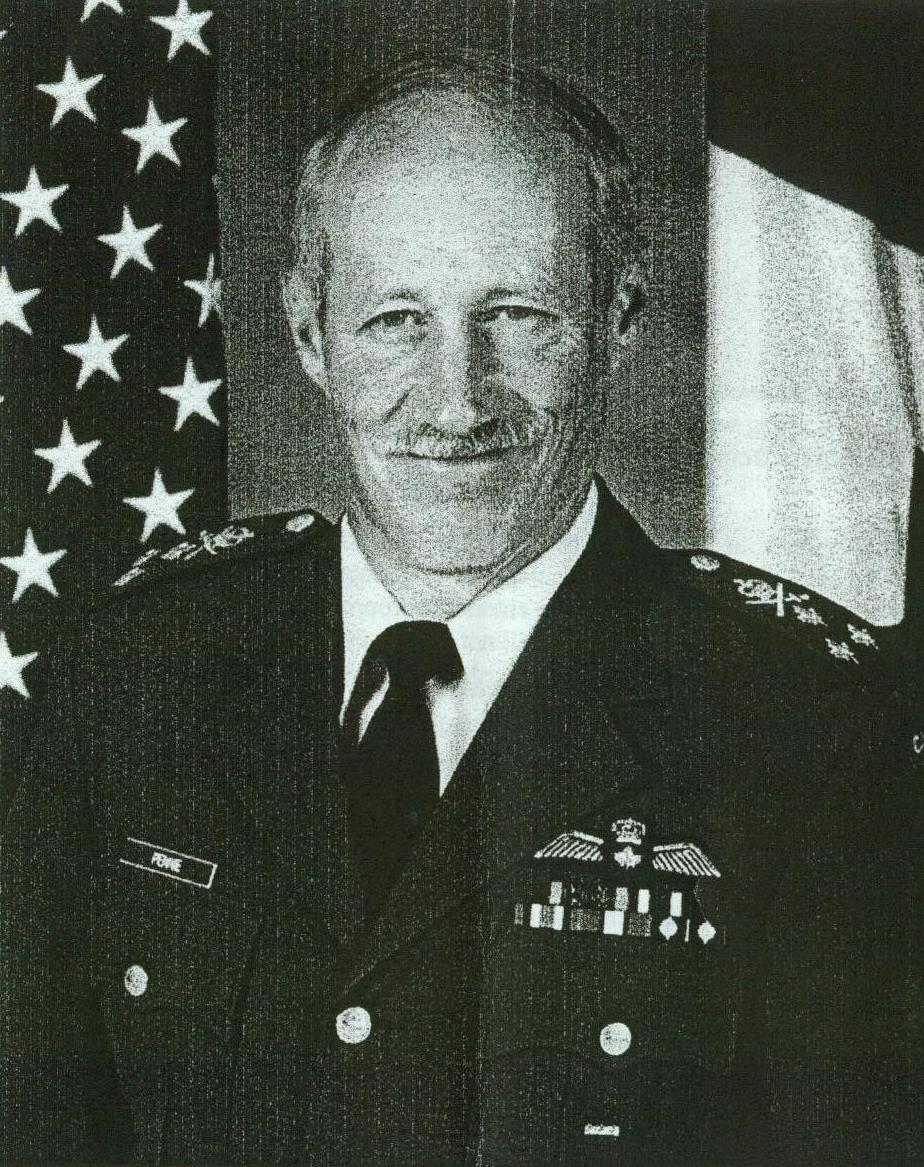
- Kenneth Pennie
- Born: 1948 or 1949 (age 77–78); Winnipeg, Manitoba
- Military career
- Allegiance: Canada
- Branch: Air Command (Note: Known as Royal Canadian Air Force until 1968)
- Service years: 1966 - 2005
- Rank: Lieutenant General
- Commands: 403 Helicopter Operational Training Squadron; 10 Tactical Air Group; Air Command
- Awards: Commander of the Order of Military Merit; Canadian Forces' Decoration

Lieutenant-General Kenneth R. Pennie, CMM, CD (born c. 1949) is a retired Canadian Air Force general. He was Chief of the Air Staff from 2003 to 2005.

== Career ==
Pennie joined the Royal Canadian Air Force in 1966 and graduated from the Royal Military College of Canada in 1970. He served as Commanding Officer of 403 Helicopter Operational Training Squadron and then became Deputy Commander of 10 Tactical Air Group in 1990, Deputy Chief of Staff, Plans and Requirements in 1993 and Commander of 10 Tactical Air Group in 1995. He went on to be Director Force Planning and Program Coordination at National Defence Headquarters in 1997, Director General Strategic Planning at National Defence Headquarters in 1998 and Deputy Commander of NORAD in 2001, seeing intense activity in that role during the September 11 attacks, before becoming Chief of the Air Staff in 2003 and retiring in 2005.

== Notes ==
Military offices
Preceded by G E C Macdonald	Deputy Commander of NORAD; 2001–2003	Succeeded by E A Findley
Preceded by L C Campbell	Chief of the Air Staff; 2003–2005	Succeeded by J S Lucas
