= General Coates =

General Coates may refer to:

- Christopher J. Coates (fl. 1980s–2020s), Royal Canadian Air Force lieutenant general
- James Coates (British Army officer) (1740–1822), British Army general
- John Coates (general) (1932–2018), Australian Army lieutenant general
