= Louis Cuppens =

Canadian Air Force officer (1944–2022)

L. W. F. (Lou) Cuppens
- Born: December 3, 1944; Nijmegen, Netherlands
- Died: December 16, 2022 (aged 78); Florida, United States
- Military career
- Allegiance: Canada
- Branch: Royal Canadian Air Force
- Rank: Lieutenant-General
- Nickname: [Lou]

Louis Wilhelmus Franciscus Cuppens, CMM, CD (December 3, 1944 – December 16, 2022) was a Royal Canadian Air Force officer who served as deputy commander of NORAD from 1995 to 1998.

He was born in Nijmegen, Netherlands during World War II and his family immigrated to Canada in 1950.

He was raised in Saint John, New Brunswick.

He joined the Reserve Force as an artillery gunner in 3 Field Regiment, Royal Canadian Artillery, in St. John, New Brunswick, before he enrolled in the Regular Force with the Canadian Army in 1963. After he was commissioned, he served in the Royal Canadian Horse Artillery in Canada and in Europe.

Cuppens commenced flying training in 1969 and earned his pilot wings the following year. After brief tours as an artillery air observation post pilot, and as a pilot with 422 Squadron, Cuppens was assigned to 403 Helicopter Operational Training Squadron as a helicopter instructor and standards pilot. He completed the Canadian Forces Command and Staff College (Land) at Kingston, Ont., in 1975.

Upon promotion to major, Cuppens was assigned as a staff officer to 10 Tactical Air Group Headquarters (10 TAG). After completing the Canadian Forces Command and Staff College, with distinction, he was promoted Lieutenant-Colonel and appointed to command 403 Squadron, where he earned the Order of Military Merit (Canada) in the grade of Officer.

Thereafter, he was assigned to Air Command Headquarters as senior staff officer tactical helicopters and concurrently filled the position of senior staff officer operations. Upon promotion to the rank of Colonel, he was appointed Deputy Commander of 10 TAG.

In March 1986, Cuppens was appointed the Chief of Liaison Services and the Commander of the Canadian Contingent Multinational Force and Observers in Sinai, Egypt.

In 1987, he was assigned to National Defense Headquarters as the Director Military Plans and Operations. In July 1989, he was promoted Brigadier-General and appointed Commander of 10 TAG. In 1992, Cuppens was promoted Major-General and appointed the Deputy Commander of Air Command, as Canada's air force was then called. In 1994, he was assigned as the Director Combat Operations NORAD (J3), in Colorado Springs, Colorado, U.S.A. He was promoted within the Order of Military Merit to the grade of Commander.

In July 1995, Cuppens was promoted Lieutenant-General and was appointed by Canada and the United States of America as Deputy- Commander-in-Chief of the North American Aerospace Defense Command. At the retirement ceremony, in April 1998, the government of the United States of America awarded Cuppens the Legion of Merit.

Cuppens and his spouse, Christine Fitzpatrick, of Saint John, New Brunswick, parented a son and a daughter, Sean and Gretchen, who have both served as members of the Canadian Forces.

Three years after Christine died in 2002, Cuppens married Patricia LaPierre (Larisey).

Cuppens was president of the New Brunswick Aerospace and Defense Association. In 1999, he was elected to chair the Defense Committee of Dominion Command of the Royal Canadian Legion. While in that position, he represented the Legion on the Canadian Forces-Veterans Affairs Canada Advisory Council that led to the creation of the Modern Day Veterans legislation. He was elected National President of the Last Post Fund and also served as National President of the Federation of United Services and Military Institutes and held various executive positions within the Corps of Commissionaires.

In April 2008, he was awarded the Minister of Veterans Affairs Commendation in recognition of his steadfast support for veterans. In 2022, Cuppens was awarded the Queen Elizabeth II Platinum Jubilee (New Brunswick) Medal.

Military offices
Preceded by J. D. O'Blenis	Deputy Commander of the North American Aerospace Defense Command; 8 August 1995 – 7 April 1998	Succeeded by G.E.C Macdonald
