= Lynn Mason =

Canadian naval officer

- Born: 1 October 1942 (age 83); London, United Kingdom
- Allegiance: Canada
- Branch: Royal Canadian Navy; Canadian Forces
- Service years: 1960–1997
- Rank: Vice-Admiral
- Commands: HMCS Iroquois; Fifth Canadian Destroyer Squadron; Standing Naval Force Atlantic; Canadian Forces College; Maritime Forces Atlantic; Maritime Command
- Awards: Commander of the Order of Military Merit; Order of Saint John; Canadian Forces' Decoration

Vice-Admiral Lynn Gordon Mason CMM, CD (born 1942) is a retired officer of the Canadian Forces. He was Commander Maritime Command from 27 June 1995 to 9 January 1997.

== Career ==
Mason joined the Royal Canadian Navy in 1960. He became Commanding Officer of the destroyer HMCS Iroquois in 1981, Commander of the Fifth Canadian Destroyer Squadron in 1985 and Commander of NATO's Standing Naval Force Atlantic in 1987. He went on to be Commandant of the Canadian Forces College in 1988, Deputy Chief of Staff for Operations at Headquarters of the Supreme Allied Commander Atlantic in 1989 and Chief of Maritime Doctrine and Operations at National Defence Headquarters in 1991. He then became Chief of Staff to the Maritime Commander in 1992, Commander Maritime Forces Atlantic in 1992 and Deputy Chief of Defence Staff in 1994. His final appointment was as Commander Maritime Command in 1995 before retiring in 1997.

After retirement, Mason became a founding board member of the Canadian Blood Services, and also served on the board of its subsidiary, CBS Insurance.

Mason also served as the Chair of Minister of National Defence’s Education Advisory Board and as Chair, of the Annual Fund Committee of the Canadian Naval Memorial Trust (HMCS Sackville). He was also Chair and Board member of the Royal Nova Scotia International Tattoo and a research Fellow at Dalhousie University’s Centre for Foreign Policy Studies.

In 2008 he became Chief Executive of CarteNav Solutions, and held that role for eight years, retiring in 2014.

Mason was awarded an honorary doctorate (LL.D. Hon) in 2000 by Dalhousie University, and subsequently an honorary doctorate (D.Sc.Mil. Hon) by Royal Military College of Canada in 2003.

== Family ==
Mason is the father of the Canadian politician Waye Mason.

== Awards and decorations ==
Mason's personal awards and decorations include the following:

Ribbon	Description	Notes
	Order of Military Merit (CMM)	Appointed Commander (CMM) on 19 May 1993
	Order of St John	Appointed Member on 2002
	Special Service Medal	with NATO-OTAN Clasp
	125th Anniversary of the Confederation of Canada Medal	Decoration awarded in 1992
	Canadian Forces' Decoration (CD)	with two Clasp for 32 years of services

Military offices
Preceded by Larry Murray	Commander Maritime Command; 1995–1997	Succeeded by Gary Garnett
