= William Keir Carr =

Canadian Air Force officer (1923–2020)

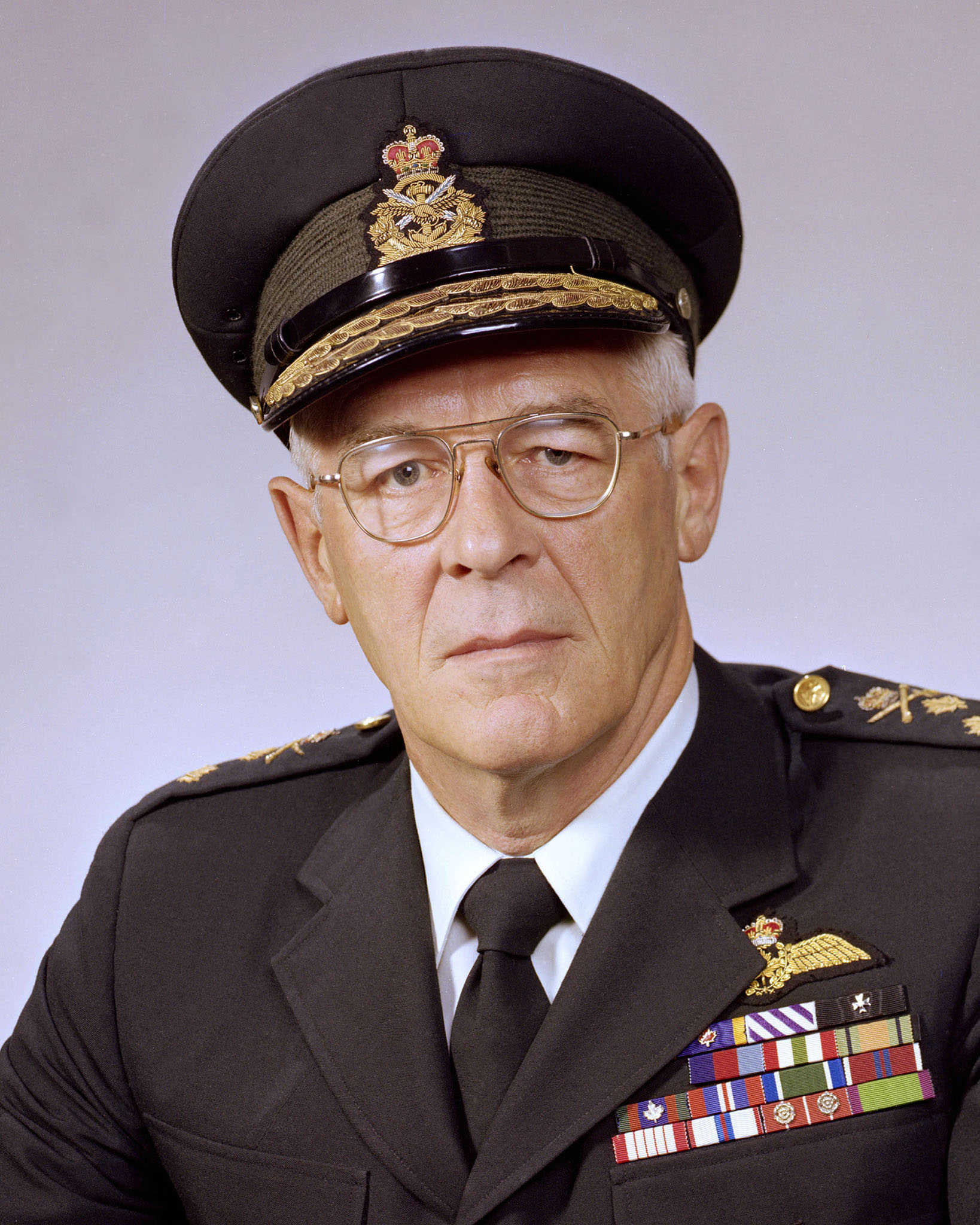
- Born: March 19, 1923; Grand Bank, Dominion of Newfoundland (now Newfoundland, Canada)
- Died: October 14, 2020 (aged 97); Ottawa, Ontario, Canada
- Military career
- Allegiance: Canada
- Branch: Air Command (Note: Known as Royal Canadian Air Force until 1968)
- Service years: 1941–1978
- Rank: Lt General
- Commands: Air Command
- Conflicts: World War II
- Awards: Commander of the Order of Military Merit; Distinguished Flying Cross; Officer of the Venerable Order of Saint John; Canadian Forces' Decoration

Lieutenant General William Keir "Bill" Carr, CMM, DFC, OStJ, CD (March 19, 1923 – October 14, 2020) was a Canadian Air Force officer. As the first commander of Air Command, he has been described as the father of the modern Canadian Air Force.

== Early years ==
Carr grew up in Newfoundland, one of six children, with four brothers and a sister. At age 18, he attended Mount Allison University and obtained his BA, during which time he sold typewriters to earn extra money for school. It was during university that he joined the Canadian Officer Training Corps.

== Second World War service ==
Recruited for service in 1941, when deployed overseas he was stationed first with No.9 OTU (operational training unit) with photo reconnaissance training on the Spitfire. Later he was deployed to No. 542 Squadron at RAF Benson flying the Spitfire PR Mk XI, one of which he flew to Malta when he was transferred to No. 683 Squadron. During one mission he suffered minor injury when his Spitfire lost control over Perugia, Italy. He also had one of the first encounters with one of the first Me 262s during a mission near Munich. With 683 Squadron in 1944 he was nominated for and received the Distinguished Flying Cross.

== Post-war service ==
After the war, Carr made swift progress through the ranks. He became Deputy Chief of the Defence Staff in 1973, during which post "he set out to undo the “handiwork” of Paul Hellyer by unscrambling air force formations and functions and consolidating them as Air Command." He then became the first Commander of Air Command in 1975 before retiring from active duty in 1978. After retirement from the Canadian Forces Carr joined Canadair where he became Vice-President of International Marketing, primarily in sales of the Canadair Challenger and later in the same role for Bombardier Aerospace.

Carr died in October 2020 at the age of 97.

== Awards and honours ==
- Distinguished Flying Cross 1944
- Venerable Order of Saint John
- Commander of the Order of Military Merit
- Legion of Merit
- Canada's Aviation Hall of Fame

== Notes ==
Military offices
Vacant Title last held by C R Dunlap (As Chief of the Air Staff until 1964)	Commander, Air Command; 1975–1978	Succeeded by G A MacKenzie
