= Gary Garnett =

Canadian naval officer (born 1945)

- Born: June 1, 1945 (age 80); Halifax, Nova Scotia
- Allegiance: Canada
- Branch: Royal Canadian Navy; Canadian Forces
- Service years: 1963–2001
- Rank: Vice-Admiral
- Commands: HMCS Iroquois; HMCS Huron; Sea Training Unit Atlantic; Second Canadian Destroyer Squadron; Maritime Forces Atlantic
- Awards: Commander of the Order of Military Merit; Order of Saint John; Canadian Forces' Decoration

Vice-Admiral Gary Leslie Garnett CMM, CD is a retired officer of the Canadian Forces. He was Chief of the Maritime Staff from 9 January to 24 September 1997.

== Career ==
Educated at Carleton University, Garnett joined the Royal Canadian Navy in 1963. He became commander of the destroyer HMCS Iroquois in 1982 and of the destroyer HMCS Huron in 1983 before taking charge of the Sea Training Unit Atlantic in 1984 and the Second Canadian Destroyer Squadron in 1986. He went on to be Director of Military Operations Coordination at the National Defence Headquarters in 1989, Executive Assistant to the Chief of the Defence Staff in 1990 and Director General Maritime Development in 1991. He then became Chief of Personnel Services in 1993, Commander Maritime Forces Atlantic in 1994 and Commander of Maritime Command (renamed Chief of the Maritime Staff when the Naval Headquarters returned from Halifax to Ottawa) during 1997. His last appointment was as Vice Chief of the Defence Staff later in 1997 before retiring in September 2001.

== Awards and decorations ==
Garnett's personal awards and decorations include the following:

Ribbon	Description	Notes
	Order of Military Merit (CMM)	Appointed Commander (CMM) on 19 May 1994; Appointed Officer (OMM) on 27 May 1991
	Order of St John	Appointed Member on 5 March 2001
	Special Service Medal	with NATO-OTAN Clasp
	125th Anniversary of the Confederation of Canada Medal	Decoration awarded in 1992
	Queen Elizabeth II Diamond Jubilee Medal	Decoration awarded in 2012; Canadian version
	Canadian Forces' Decoration (CD)	with two Clasp for 32 years of services

Military offices
Preceded by Lynn Mason	Chief of the Maritime Staff; 1997	Succeeded by Greg Maddison
Preceded by Larry Murray	Vice Chief of the Defence Staff; 1997–2001	Succeeded by George Macdonald
