= Edwin Reyno =

RCAF Air Marshal (1917-1982)

Edwin Michael Reyno
- Born: 11 May 1917; Halifax, Nova Scotia, Canada
- Died: 10 February 1982 (aged 64); Arlington, Texas, U.S.
- Burial place: Herring Cove, Nova Scotia
- Military career
- Allegiance: Canada
- Branch: (Canada) Royal Canadian Air Force (to 1968); Canadian Forces (1968-1975)
- Service years: 1938-1975
- Rank: Air Marshal / Lieutenant-General
- Commands: Chief of Personnel Canada; Deputy Commander of NORAD; Chief of Air Staff, 4th Allied Tactical Air Force
- Conflicts: World War II: Battle of Britain
- Awards: Air Force Cross; Canadian Forces' Decoration
- Other work: Remained in RCAF until 1975; later worked for LTV Aerospace in Texas, USA and taught courses at the University of Texas (Dallas-Fort Worth)

Edwin Michael Reyno AFC, CD (11 May 1917 – 10 February 1982) was an Air Marshal in the Royal Canadian Air Force and a Lieutenant-General in the integrated Canadian Forces.

== Biography ==
Born in Halifax, Nova Scotia, he graduated from Saint Mary's University with a Bachelor of Arts degree. Enlisting in the RCAF 3 January 1938, Reyno was deployed overseas with No.1 (C) Squadron. He served as both a fighter pilot and an instructor, and fought with distinction during the Battle of Britain.

After the war, Reyno attended RCAF Staff College in 1947 and Imperial Defence College in 1959. He served as the Director of Strategic Air Plans from 1952 until 1955, when he was promoted to Air Commodore and made the Air Officer Commanding at Air Defence Command. In 1963 he was promoted to Air Vice-Marshal and made Chief of Air Staff, 4th Allied Tactical Air Force. A final promotion to Air Marshal came in July 1966, when he was appointed Chief of Personnel of the Canadian Forces. From 1969 to 1972, he was the Deputy Commander of NORAD. He had three daughters, Nancy, Ruth, and Kathleen. He died in 1982 of cancer.

Military offices
Preceded by Frederick Ralph Sharp	Deputy Commander of NORAD; 1969 – 1972	Succeeded by Reginald J. Lane
