= General Lane =

General Lane may refer to:

- Barry Lane (British Army officer) (born 1932), British Army major general
- James Henry Lane (Confederate general) (1833–1907), Confederate States Army brigadier general
- James Henry Lane (Union general) (1814–1866), Union Army brigadier general
- Joseph Lane (1801–1881), U.S. Army brigadier general
- Reginald J. Lane (1920–2003), Royal Canadian Air Force lieutenant general
- Ronald Lane (1847–1937), British Army major general
- Sam Lane (character), fictional U.S. Army general in DC Comics media
- Walter P. Lane (1817–1892), Confederate States Army major general

== See also ==
- Attorney General Lane (disambiguation)
