= General Findlay =

General Findlay may refer to:

- James Findlay (Cincinnati mayor) (1770–1835), Ohio Militia major general
- Neil Douglas Findlay (1859–1914), British Army brigadier general
- Rick Findley (born 1950), Royal Canadian Air Force lieutenant general

== See also ==
- Clement Finley (1797–1879), Union Army brigadier general
- Jesse J. Finley (1812–1904), Confederate States Army brigadier general
