= General Morton =

General Morton may refer to:

- Charles Gould Morton (1861–1933), U.S. Army major general
- Gerald Morton (1845–1906), British Army lieutenant general
- Jacob Morton (1756–1836), New York Militia major general in the War of 1812
- James St. Clair Morton (1829–1864), Union Army brigadier general
- Robert W. Morton (1937–2002), Royal Canadian Air Force lieutenant general
