= Larry Murray (admiral) =

- Murray at the christening of CCGS Cape Discovery, on June 10, 2006
- Born: June 6, 1947 (age 79); Stratford, Ontario, Canada
- Military career
- Allegiance: Canada
- Branch: Royal Canadian Navy; Canadian Forces
- Rank: Vice-Admiral
- Commands: HMCS Chaleur; HMCS Miramichi; HMCS Iroquois; Maritime Forces Atlantic; Maritime Command
- Awards: Member of the Order of Canada Commander of the Order of Military Merit; Order of Saint John; Canadian Forces' Decoration
- Other work: Deputy Minister, Veterans Affairs Canada; Deputy Minister, Fisheries and Oceans Canada

Vice-Admiral Lawrence Edward Murray CM CMM CD (born 6 June 1947) is a retired Canadian civil servant, naval officer and former acting chief of the Defence Staff.

== Military career ==
Born in Stratford, Ontario, Murray joined the Royal Canadian Navy in September 1964. Murray served as the commanding officer of various ships including the minesweepers HMCS Chaleur and HMCS Miramichi and the destroyer HMCS Iroquois. He was appointed commander of the First Canadian Destroyer Squadron in 1987 and director-general of Maritime Doctrine & Operations at National Defence Headquarters in 1989.

He went on to be assistant deputy with the minister policy & communications portfolio in 1991 and deputy commander of Maritime Command in 1993. He became commander of Maritime Command in Halifax, Nova Scotia in 1994. He became vice chief of the Defence Staff in 1995 continuing in that role while serving as acting chief of Defence Staff from October 8, 1996 until September 17, 1997.

== Civilian career ==
In 1997, Murray was appointed associate deputy minister of Fisheries and Oceans Canada and in 1999 was appointed deputy minister of Veterans Affairs Canada. He was subsequently appointed deputy minister of Fisheries and Oceans Canada and served in that role from 2003 until his retirement from the public sector in 2007.

Murray was a member of the Task Force on Governance and Cultural Change in the Royal Canadian Mounted Police, a Trudeau Foundation Mentor, and served as president of the Nova Scotia Mainland Division of the Navy League of Canada. From 2008 to 2015, he served as an external member of the National Defence Audit Committee and, from 2009 to 2017, as chair of the Privy Council Audit Committee. In June 2010, Murray took over the honorary position of grand president of the Royal Canadian Legion. In 2015, Murray became chair of the Independent Review Panel on Defence Acquisition.

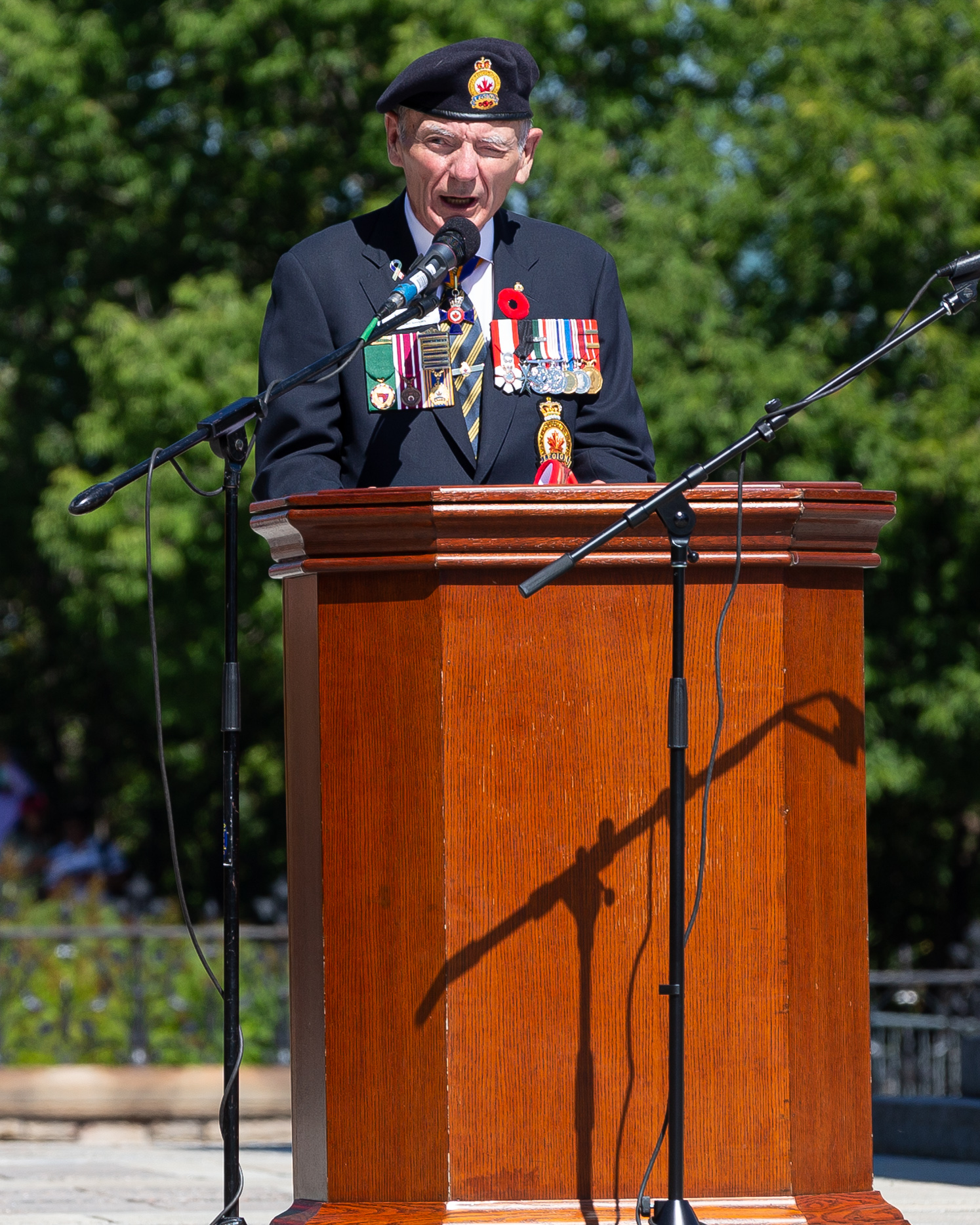
Vice Admiral (ret'd) Murray addresses the 75th anniversary of VJ Day parade, Ottawa, Ontario

== Medals and awards ==

Ribbon	Description	Notes
	Member of the Order of Canada	CM
	Commander of the Order of Military Merit	CMM
	Order of St. John	
	Special Service Medal	
	125th Anniversary of the Confederation of Canada Medal	
	Queen Elizabeth II Golden Jubilee Medal	
	Queen Elizabeth II Diamond Jubilee Medal	
	King Charles III Coronation Medal	
	Canadian Forces' Decoration with 2 bars for 32 years of service	CD
	Queen Elizabeth II Platinum Jubilee Medal	

In 1983, Murray was made an officer of the Order of Military Merit, and was promoted to the grade of commander in 1994.

In 1984, Murray was awarded the Chief of Defense Staff (CDS) Commendation for his role as Commanding Officer of HMCS Iroquois in the successful rescue of the crew of the foundering Panamanian bulk freighter HO MING 5 in a gale south of Newfoundland in December 1983. HMCS Iroquois also received a CDS Unit Commendation for the same rescue.

In 1998, he was a recipient of the Vimy Award, which recognizes a Canadian who has made a significant and outstanding contribution to the defence and security of Canada and the preservation of its democratic values.

Murray served in the honorary position of colonel commandant of the Chaplain Branch of the Canadian Forces for five years and was appointed a member of the Order of St John in 2001. He was awarded the Minister of Veterans Affairs Commendation for his contribution to the care and well-being of veterans and to the remembrance of their service and sacrifice.

On June 28, 2013, he was appointed a member of the Order of Canada "for his leadership in the public service and for his regional and national voluntary commitments".

Military offices
Preceded by P. W. Cairns	Commander Maritime Command; 1994–1995	Succeeded by L. G. Mason
Preceded by P. O'Donnell	Vice Chief of the Defence Staff; 1995–1997	Succeeded by G. L. Garnett
Preceded by J. E. J. Boyle	Acting Chief of the Defence Staff; 1996–1997	Succeeded by J. G. M. Baril
