= Kenneth Lewis (general) =

Canadian air force general

- Born: c. 1929; Wood River, Alberta, Canada
- Died: February 4, 1992 (aged 62); Stittsville, Ontario, Canada
- Military career
- Allegiance: Canada
- Branch: Air Command (Note: Known as Royal Canadian Air Force until 1968)
- Service years: Late 1940s-1983
- Rank: Lieutenant-General
- Commands: Air Command
- Awards: Commander of the Order of Military Merit; Canadian Forces' Decoration

Lieutenant-General Kenneth Edward Lewis CMM, CD (c. 1929 – February 4, 1992) was a Canadian air force general who was Commander, Air Command in Canada from 1980 to 1983.

== Career ==
A native of Ponoka, Alberta, Lewis joined the Royal Canadian Air Force in the late 1940s and, after graduating from the Royal Military College of Canada, trained as a pilot. He became Commandant of the Royal Roads Military College in 1968 and, after serving in various senior staff positions, became Deputy Commander NORAD in 1978 and Commander, Air Command in 1980 before retiring in 1983.

In retirement he became President of The Aerospace Industry Association of Canada. He died of prostate cancer in 1992 at the age of 62.

== Notes ==
Military offices
Preceded by D R Adamson	Deputy Commander of NORAD; 1978–1980	Succeeded by K J Thorneycroft
Preceded by G A MacKenzie	Commander, Air Command; 1980–1983	Succeeded by P D Manson
