= Donald McNaughton (Canadian general) =

Canadian air force general (born 1934)

- Born: August 1934 (age 92); Perth, Ontario
- Military career
- Allegiance: Canada
- Branch: Air Command (Note: Known as Royal Canadian Air Force until 1968)
- Service years: 1952–1989
- Rank: Lieutenant-General
- Commands: 427 Squadron; CFB Winnipeg; 10 Tactical Air Group; Air Command
- Awards: Commander of the Order of Military Merit; Canadian Forces' Decoration

Lieutenant-General Donald Malcolm McNaughton CMM, CD (born August 1934) is a Canadian retired air force general who was Commander, Air Command in Canada from 1985 to 1986.

== Career ==
McNaughton joined the Royal Canadian Air Force in 1952 and trained as a fighter pilot flying F-86 Sabre aircraft. He became Commanding Officer of 427 Squadron in 1973, Deputy Chief of Staff Operations Support at Mobile Command in 1974 and Deputy Commander of 10 Tactical Air Group in 1975 (during which posting he served as Deputy Commander of the Canadian United Nations contingent in the Middle East). He went on to be Base Commander of CFB Winnipeg in 1977, Director General in the Air Branch in the National Defence Headquarters in 1978 and Commander of 10 Tactical Air Group in 1981. After that he became Deputy Commander, Air Command in 1982, Commander, Air Command in 1985 and Deputy Commander of NORAD in 1986 before retiring in 1989.

== Notes ==
Military offices
Preceded by P D Manson	Commander, Air Command; 1985–1986	Succeeded by L A Ashley
Preceded by D C MacKenzie	Deputy Commander of NORAD; 1986–1989	Succeeded by R W Morton
