= Richard C. Stovel =

Royal Canadian Air Force officer (1921–2012)

- Born: March 31, 1921; Winnipeg, Manitoba
- Died: June 12, 2012 (aged 91); Victoria, British Columbia
- Military career
- Allegiance: Canada
- Branch: Air Command (Note: Known as Royal Canadian Air Force until 1968)
- Service years: 1940–1976
- Rank: Lieutenant-General

Richard Carlton Stovel (March 31, 1921 – June 12, 2012) was a Royal Canadian Air Force and Canadian Forces Air Command officer. He served as deputy commander of NORAD from 1974 to 1976.

== Notes ==
Military offices
Preceded by Reginald J. Lane	Deputy Commander of the North American Aerospace Defense Command; 2 October 1974 – 15 September 1976	Succeeded by David R. Adamson
