= Frederick Ralph Sharp =

Canadian Air Force officer (1915–1992)

- General Frederick Ralph Sharp
- Born: December 28, 1915; Moosomin, Saskatchewan
- Died: June 10, 1992 (aged 76)
- Military career
- Allegiance: Canada
- Branch: Royal Canadian Air Force (1938–1968); Canadian Forces (1968–1972)
- Service years: 1938–1972
- Rank: General
- Commands: RCAF Training Command
- Awards: Commander of the Order of Military Merit; Distinguished Flying Cross; Canadian Forces' Decoration

General Frederick Ralph Sharp CMM DFC CD (December 28, 1915 – June 10, 1992) was a Royal Canadian Air Force officer and Chief of Defence Staff of the Canadian Forces.

== Education ==
Sharp was born in Moosomin, Saskatchewan in 1915 and graduated from the Royal Military College of Canada in 1938, student # 2420. He was raised at Trenton, Ontario. He attended the War Staff College in 1944. He was a student at the National Defence College, Kingston. After the war, he furthered his education by completing his Masters in Business Administration at the University of Western Ontario.

== Military career ==
Following the outbreak of war, he joined the Royal Canadian Air Force in Trenton, Ontario in July 1939. He earned his wings as a pilot in Trenton in 1939. He completed the flying instructor course at Camp Borden in 1939. He spent over four years [51 months] on instructional duties in Alberta, before being posted overseas as C.O. of No. 408 Bomber Squadron, 6 Bomber Group 26 November 1944. He won a Distinguished Flying Cross (DFC) on 4 May 1945 with No. 408 Goose Squadron. He served as a flying instructor for the BCATP during World War II. He was a squadron commander at the close of the war.

In 1946, he was a member of the Chelsey committee which was instructed to make recommendations about the provision of officers for the active force, about the educational requirements of candidates, and about the way they should be trained. The committee, headed by Brigadier Leonard McEwan Chelsey (RMC 1917) favored three plans. Plan A proposed to eliminate Royal Military College of Canada in Kingston, Ontario as a source of officers and to use the site as a two-year course for military training of university graduates. Plan B proposed to enlarge RMC so it could provide the total annual requirements of the active force, to make it free and to impose an obligation on graduates to serve in the active force. Plan C proposed to enlarge RMC to produce 50–70% of the officers needed and to have a parallel officer training system in universities to prepare the balance.

After the war, Sharp served with the Air Force HQ and Central Flying School in Trenton. He served as an exchange officer posted as Directing Staff at the RAF Staff College in Britain.

In 1959, he became the commander of the RCAF Training Command and various posting with NORAD. Sharp was promoted to air marshal in the RCAF. He served as vice chief of defence staff from 1966. The following year, in 1968, he was regraded from air marshal to lieutenant general and in January 1969 he was appointed deputy commander-in-chief of NORAD.

In 1969, Sharp was elevated to the rank of general and served as Chief of Defence Staff of the Canadian Armed Forces from 1969 to 1972. He retired in 1972 and became a partner in a consulting firm until 1979. In 1983 he joined retired Canadian ambassador Ross Campbell, as a founding partner in the consulting company InterCon Consultants.

He wrote a paper for the July–August 1967 Air University Review on the Reorganization of the Canadian Armed Forces.

== Family ==
He was married to Betty Sharp and had two sons, John and Richard, and three daughters, Brenda, Barbara and Elizabeth. Brenda Sharp married Charles Walton Cole and had three sons, Adam, Alex and Michael. Richard had daughter Casey and son Justin with wife Kathryn, John had daughters Sariya and Alexa with wife Madelene.

== Legacy ==
The papers he collected on the reorganization and the unification of the Canadian Forces are included in the Robert Lewis Raymont fonds at Wilfrid Laurier University.

Military offices
Preceded by Robert Moncel	Vice Chief of the Defence Staff; 1966–1969	Succeeded by Michael Dare
Preceded by William R. MacBrien	Deputy Commander of NORAD; January – September 1969	Succeeded by Edwin Reyno
Preceded by J.V. Allard	Chief of the Defence Staff; 1969–1972	Succeeded by J.A. Dextraze
