= Allan MacKenzie =

Canadian air force general

- Born: December 15, 1931; Kingston, Jamaica
- Died: September 10, 2012 (aged 80); Winnipeg, Manitoba
- Military career
- Allegiance: Canada
- Branch: Royal Canadian Air Force / Canadian Forces
- Rank: Lieutenant-General
- Commands: Air Command
- Awards: Commander of the Order of Military Merit; Canadian Forces' Decoration

Lieutenant-General George Allan MacKenzie CMM, CD (December 15, 1931 – September 10, 2012) was a Canadian air force general who served as Commander, Air Command in Canada from 1978 to 1980.

== Personal life ==
George Allan MacKenzie was born in Kingston, Jamaica, on December 15, 1931, to George Adam and Annette Louise MacKenzie. He had two siblings, David (Mickey) and Audrey. He attended Jamaica College from 1944 to 1948.

MacKenzie moved to Canada in 1950 to join the Royal Canadian Air Force, eventually finding his way to Winnipeg, Manitoba.

He was a member of the Manitoba Club and the Royal Military Institute of Manitoba.

MacKenzie was married to Valerie Ann, following his first wife, Doris Elliot. George and Valerie had two children together, Michael and Barbara. On September 10, 2012, at the age of 80, MacKenzie died at the Victoria General Hospital in Winnipeg.

== Career ==
MacKenzie began his flying career with British Overseas Airways Corporation in Jamaica, which led to him to move to Canada in 1950 to join the Royal Canadian Air Force, where he trained as a pilot.

After completing officer training and pilot training, he commenced his flying duties in 1952, as a Flying Officer. During his career, he commanded a squadron, a base, and the Maritime Air Group. In 1978, MacKenzie was promoted to the role of Lieutenant-General, and appointed Commander, Air Command (also known as the Chief of Staff for the Canadian Air Force). He retired from the Air Force in 1980.

In retirement, he joined Gendis Inc. in Winnipeg, Manitoba, from 1980 to 2002, where he served as Executive Vice-president, Chief Operating Officer, and later President and chief executive officer. He also served a year as President of Sony of Canada, as well as being on the company's board of directors.

He served as a member of the Regional Advisory Board for Carleton University, a Governor of the Canadian Corps of Commissionaires, an advisor to the Association of Canadian Police Chiefs.

== Honours ==
MacKenzie was decorated a Commander of the Order of Military Merit on June 18, 1979, as well as an Officer of the Order of St. John's, and the Canadian Forces Decoration. He was also a Knight of the Order of St. Lazarus of Jerusalem, and received the Queen's Diamond Jubilee Medal.

He was appointed the Honorary Chairman of the Manitoba Provincial Committee of the Air Cadet League of Canada in 2010.

Military offices
Preceded by W.K. Carr	Commander, Air Command; 1978–1980	Succeeded by K.E. Lewis
