= Donald C. MacKenzie =

Canadian Forces Air Command general (1931–2021)

Donald C. Mackenzie
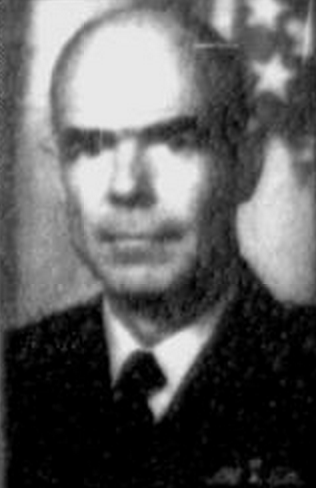
- Lieutenant-General Donald Colin Mackenzie, CD, CMM
- Born: May 27, 1931; Mexico City, Mexico
- Died: December 20, 2021 (aged 90)
- Spouse: Margaret Thistle (m. 1954)
- Military career
- Allegiance: Canada
- Branch: Canadian Forces Air Command
- Rank: Lieutenant-General

Donald Colin Mackenzie (May 27, 1931 – December 20, 2021) was a Canadian Forces Air Command general. He served as deputy commander of NORAD from 1983 to 1986. He is an alumnus of the University of Alberta, earning a Bachelor of Commerce degree in 1959. He also earned an honorary doctorate of Law. In 2003, he received a University of Alberta Alumni Association's Distinguished Alumni Award. Mackenzie has also served on the board of directors of PanAmerican Beverages Inc. Mackenzie died on December 20, 2021, at the age of 90.

Military offices
Preceded by K J Thorneycroft	Deputy Commander of NORAD; 1983 - 1986	Succeeded by D M McNaughton
