= Alberta Centennial Medal =

Commemorative medal of the Canadian province of Alberta

- Obverse of the medal
- Type: Medal
- Awarded for: "significant contributions to their fellow citizens, their community and to Alberta"
- Presented by: The lieutenant governor of Alberta
- Eligibility: Citizens of Canada that reside in, or have resided in, Alberta
- Established: 24 March 2005

Highlights
- Total: Approximately 8,000
- Ribbon bar of the medal

Precedence
- Next (higher): Commemorative Medal for the Centennial of Saskatchewan
- Next (lower): Queen Elizabeth II Platinum Jubilee Medal

The Alberta Centennial Medal is a commemorative medal celebrating Alberta's first 100 years as a province of Canada.

== History ==
In 2005, the Alberta Centennial Medal Act established the Alberta Centennial Medal.

== Purpose ==
The Alberta Centennial Medal Act established a process to award medals to outstanding Albertans who had made a significant contribution to society and to honour their contributions.

== Eligibility ==
Eligibility for the medal was restricted to living men, women and youth who made significant contributions to their fellow citizens, their community and to Alberta, and were Canadian citizens that had resided in Alberta.

Approximately 8,000 medals were awarded to outstanding Albertans. Representatives from provincial organizations, governments and other groups were asked to make the nominations. Only nominations submitted by these nominating partners were accepted.

The following are among those who received the Alberta Centennial Medal:

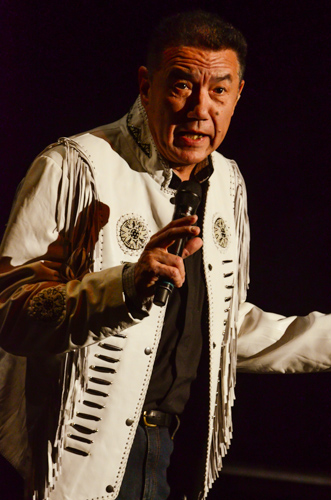
Tom Jackson

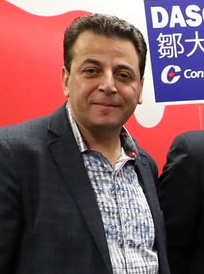
Ziad Aboultaif

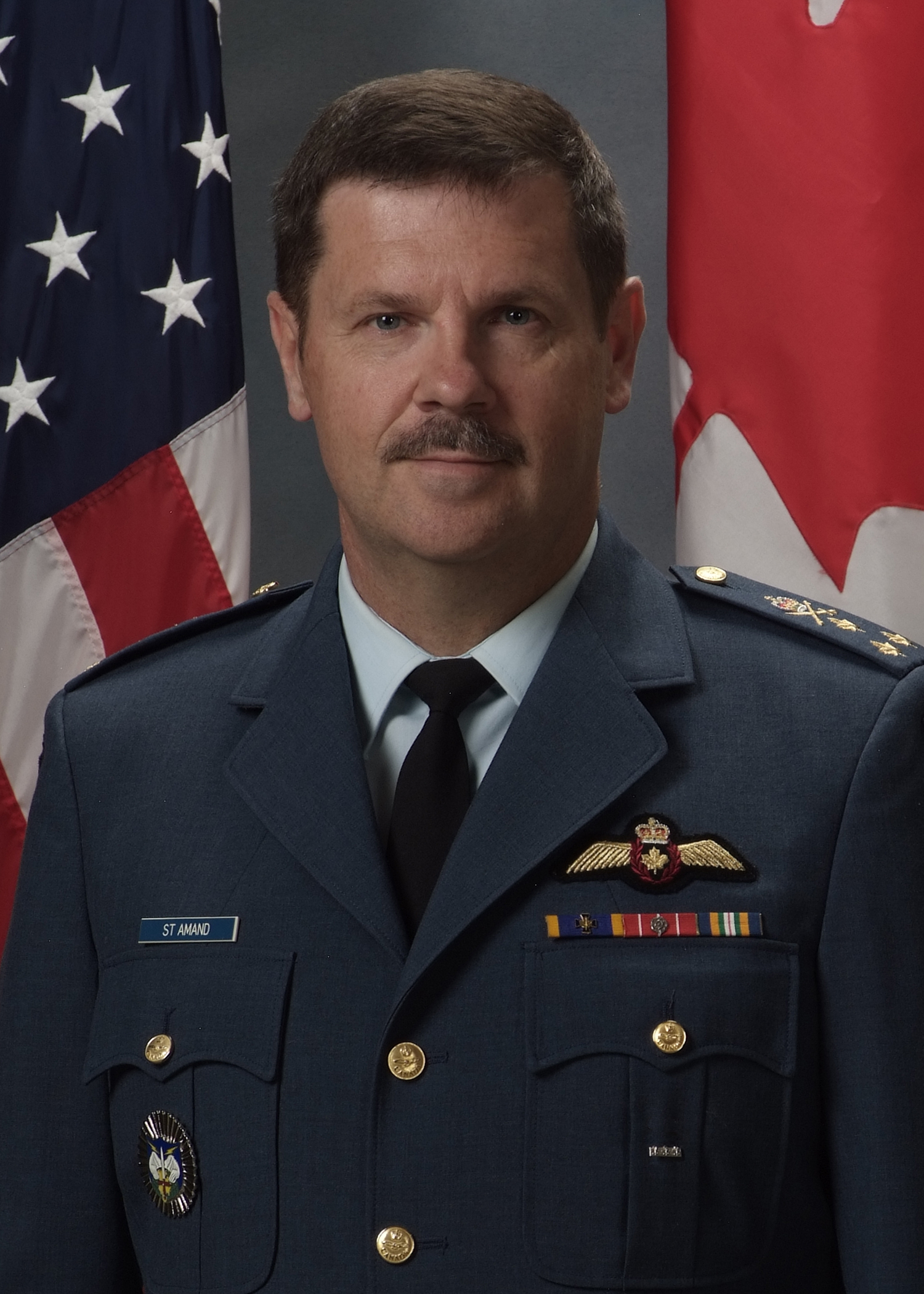
Pierre St-Amand

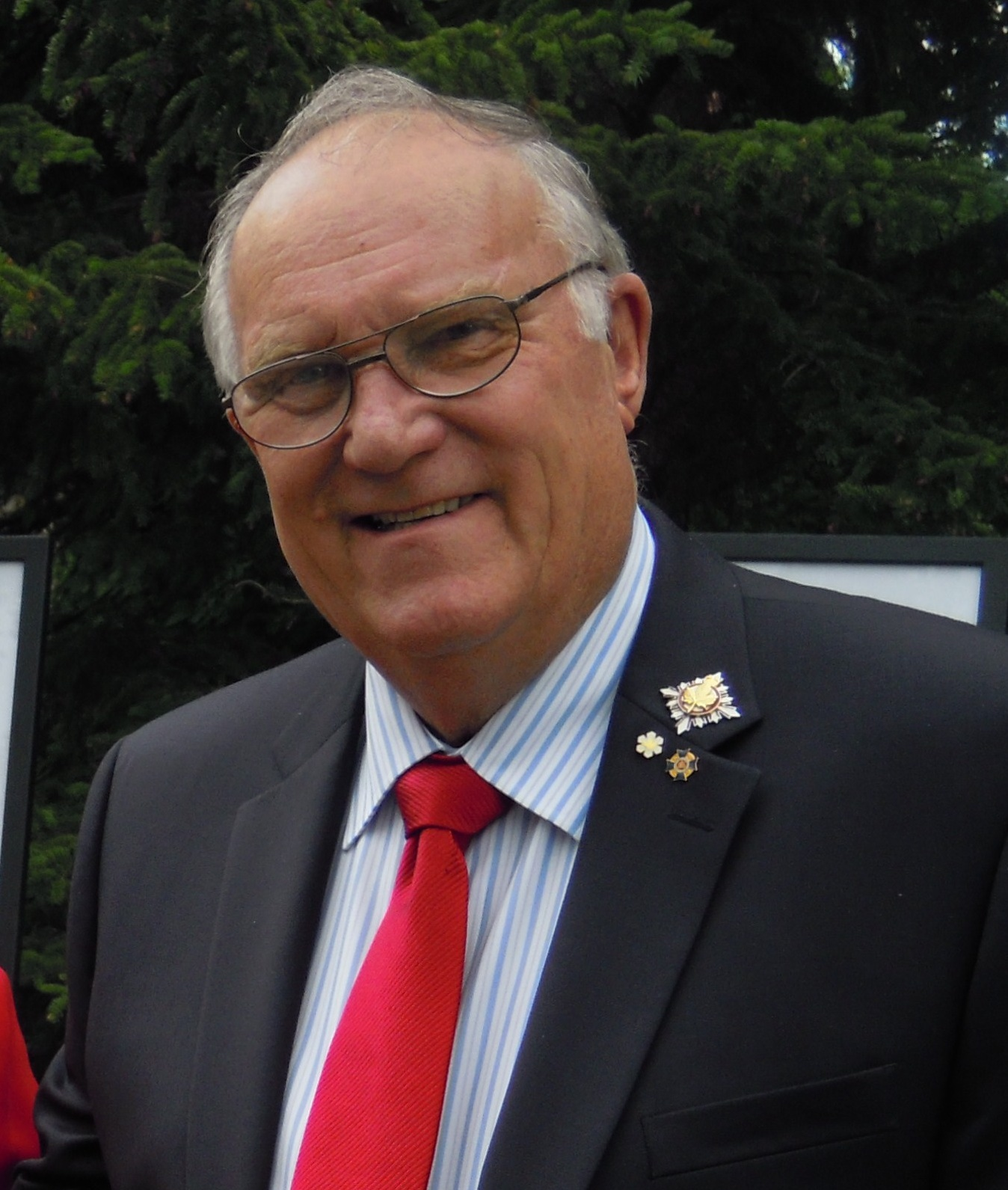
Donald Ethell

== Design ==
The medal's simple design features Alberta's coat of arms and the words "Alberta Centennial 1905–2005" on the front and shield of the arms and "Honouring Outstanding Albertans" on the back. It is cast in bronze and plated in gold.

The colours of the medal's ribbon symbolize Alberta's spirit and strengths. Blue and gold, Alberta's provincial colours, are most prominent in the ribbon. All the colours in the ribbon are taken from Alberta's official emblems and heraldry. They are :

Alberta's coat of arms

- Blue: clear skies and sparkling lakes
- Gold: wheat fields and resource wealth
- Green: forests
- White: mountains
- Pink: wild rose

The Alberta Centennial Medal is included in the Canadian order of precedence of decorations and medals and may be mounted and worn with other official honours.

== See also ==
- List of Canadian awards
- Orders, decorations, and medals of the Canadian provinces
