= Attorney General Lane =

Attorney General Lane may refer to:

- Gary Lane (politician) (born 1942), Attorney General of Saskatchewan
- William Preston Lane Jr. (1892–1967), Attorney General of Maryland

== See also ==
- General Lane (disambiguation)
