= Rick Findley =

Canadian Forces Air Command officer

Eric A. Findley
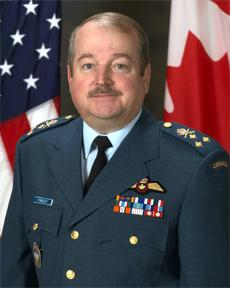
- Official portrait of Findley
- Born: 1950 (age 75–76); Ottawa, Ontario, Canada
- Military career
- Allegiance: Canada
- Branch: Air Command
- Service years: 1968 – 2007
- Rank: Lieutenant-General

Lieutenant-General Eric A. "Rick" Findley, CMM, MSC, CD (born 1950) is a retired general of the Canadian Forces Air Command and was the Deputy Commander of the North American Aerospace Defense Command (NORAD) from July 2003 through August 2007.

== Early life and career ==
Findley was born in Ottawa, Ontario, in 1950.

He entered the Canadian Forces in 1968 and was trained as a pilot. He flew with the 408 Tactical Helicopter Squadron, (CFB Edmonton); No. 444 Squadron RCAF (CFB Lahr); No. 403 Squadron RCAF (CFB Gagetown), and commanded the No. 427 Squadron RCAF (CFB Petawawa). During peacekeeping operations, he commanded and flew with United Nations (UN) and Multinational Force and Observer (MFO) aviation units in the Sinai, Central America, and Haiti. The logbook reflects over 4600 flying hours, primarily in helicopters. He has commanded at the flight, squadron (427 Squadron), and wing level (7 Wing/CFB Ottawa). He has commanded two Canadian peacekeeping contingents, and served as Chief of Staff for the MFO.

Findley served on several different staffs. He served as Senior Staff Officer Plans, Doctrine, and Requirements with 10 Tactical Air Group headquarters; Staff Officer in the Directorate of Peacekeeping Operations and National Defence Operations Centre at National Defence Headquarters; Executive Assistant to the Deputy Chief of Defence Staff at National Defence Headquarters; Chief of Staff for Personnel, Training, and Reserves (A1) at Air Command Headquarters and 1 Canadian Air Division; Chief of Staff for Operations (A3) at 1 Canadian Air Division/Canadian NORAD Region; and Director of Combat Operations (NJ3) at NORAD headquarters. Findley finished his military career as Deputy Commander of the North American Aerospace Defense Command (NORAD) from July 2003 through August 2007.

== Education ==
Findley has a Bachelor of Science in biology from Carleton University and has graduated from the Canadian Forces Command and Staff College, Toronto; French Language Training, Montreal; Royal College of Defence Studies, London, and Combined Force Air Component Commander Course, Maxwell Air Force Base.

== Awards and decorations ==
Findley's awards and decorations include Commander of the Order of Military Merit, Meritorious Service Cross for action taken during the September 11, 2001 attacks, Special Service Medal for duty in NATO, Peacekeeping Medals from UN missions in Central America and Haiti, the MFO medal for service in the peacekeeping mission in Egypt/Israel, the Canadian Peacekeeping Service Medal, and the Canadian Forces' Decoration.

Military offices
Preceded by Ken Pennie	Deputy Commander of the North American Aerospace Defense Command; 14 July 2003 – 2 August 2007	Succeeded by Charles Bouchard
