= David R. Adamson =

Royal Canadian Air Force officer (1923–2011)

- Born: March 10, 1923; Lloydminster, Saskatchewan
- Died: July 31, 2011 (aged 88); Vancouver Island, British Columbia
- Military career
- Allegiance: Canada
- Branch: Royal Canadian Air Force
- Service years: 1937–1978
- Rank: Lieutenant-General

David Ritchie Adamson (March 10, 1923 – July 31, 2011) was a Royal Canadian Air Force and Canadian Forces Air Command officer. He served as deputy commander of NORAD from 1976 to 1978.

Military offices
Preceded by Richard C. Stovel	Deputy Commander of the North American Aerospace Defense Command; 16 September 1976 – 17 August 1978	Succeeded by Kenneth E. Lewis
