= Pierre St-Amand =

Canadian air force general

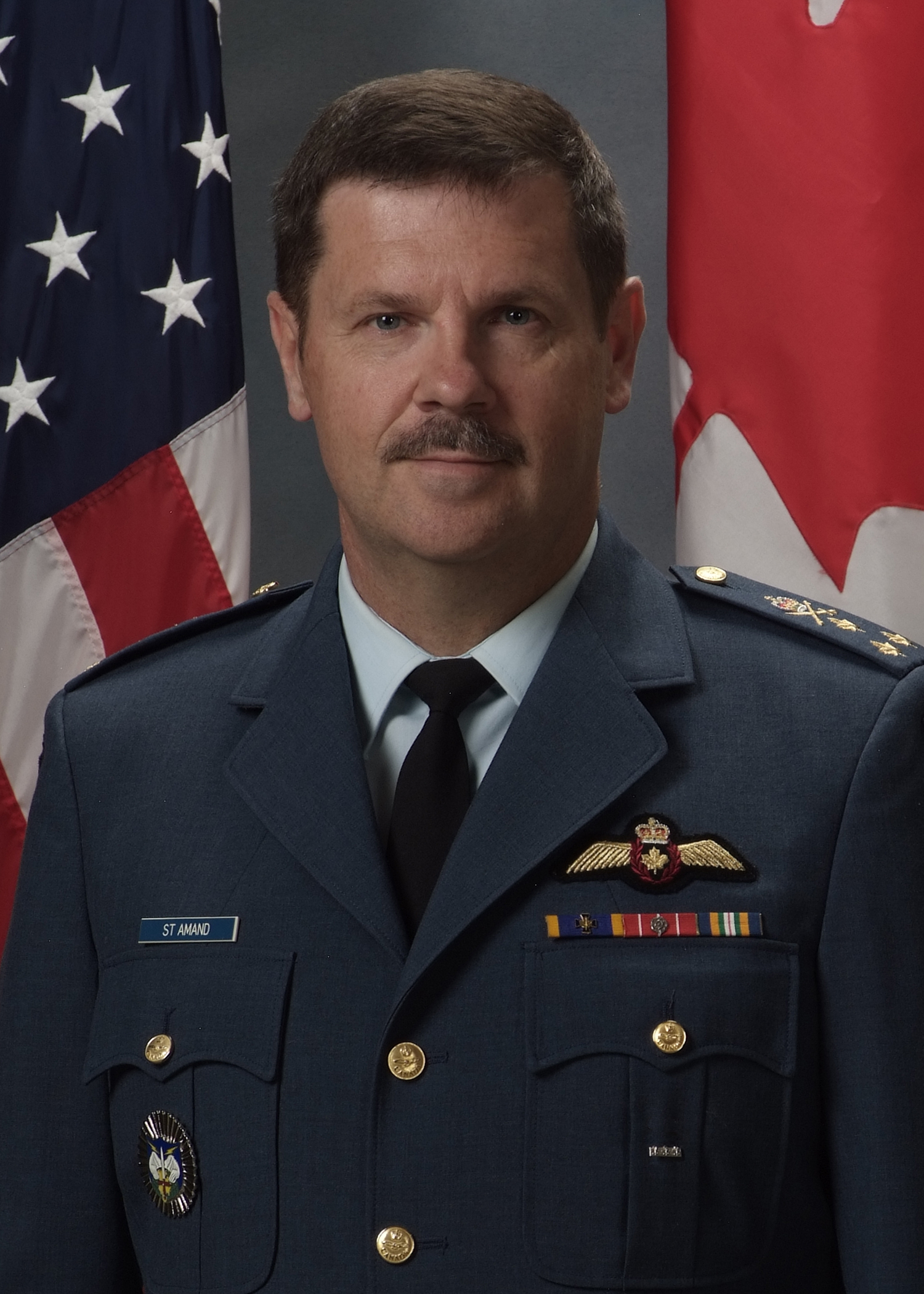
- Born: La Sarre, Quebec, Canada
- Allegiance: Canada
- Branch: Royal Canadian Air Force (Note: Known as Air Command until 2011)
- Service years: 1981–2018
- Rank: Lieutenant General
- Commands: 441 Tactical Fighter Squadron 4 Wing Cold Lake 1 Canadian Air Division
- Awards: Commander of the Order of Military Merit; Canadian Forces' Decoration with 2 Clasps; Alberta Centennial Medal

Joseph Pierre Julien St-Amand CMM CD is a retired Royal Canadian Air Force Lieutenant-General. St-Amand served as deputy commander of North American Aerospace Defense Command and led its Canadian Element between 2015 and 2018. He previously commanded 441 Tactical Fighter Squadron, 4 Wing, and 1 Canadian Air Division, and was SHAPE Director of Strategic Planning between 2010 and 2011. During his tenure at SHAPE, St-Amand oversaw strategic planning for Operation Unified Protector.

== Biography ==
St. Amand was born in La Sarre. In 1980 he graduated from Cite Etudiante Polyno in La Sarre.

St-Amand joined the Canadian Armed Forces in June 1981 and graduated from the Royal Military College of Canada in 1986 with a Bachelor Degree in Electrical Engineering. He received pilot training and completed the CF-18 advanced fighter pilot course in fall 1988. Between 1989 and 1992 St-Amand served as an operational fighter pilot with 433 Tactical Fighter Squadron. Until the summer of 1999, he was an instructor and Operational Test and Evaluation pilot with 410 Tactical Fighter Operational Training Squadron.

In 1999, St-Amand attended and graduated from the Canadian Forces Command Staff College. He was posted to Directorate Aerospace Requirements 5 (Fighters and Trainers) at National Defense Headquarters. St-Amand was promoted to the rank of lieutenant colonel in 2001 and became project director for CF-18 modernization.

St-Amand commanded 441 Tactical Fighter Squadron between 2003 and 2005. He attended and graduated from the Air War College with a master's degree in strategic studies and a certificate of Practitioner of Joint Warfare. In 2005 and was promoted to colonel. St-Amand became Combined Forces Air Component Commander Forward in 2006. In 2007, he became commander of 4 Wing. In 2009, St-Amand became senior advisor to the Chief of the Defense Staff. He received the Alberta Centennial Medal in May 2009. In January 2010 he became director of strategic plans at NATO headquarters and was promoted to Brigadier general. During his tenure at SHAPE, St-Amand directed strategic planning for NATO's 2010 Pakistan floods relief operation and Operation Unified Protector.

In July 2011 he returned to Canada and became deputy commander of 1 Canadian Air Division. In September 2012, he was appointed commander of 1 Canadian Air Division/Canadian NORAD Region. In 2014, St-Amand was made a Commander of the Order of Military Merit. St-Amand became director of operations at NORAD Headquarters in July 2014. On 1 July 2015 he was promoted to lieutenant general and became deputy commander of NORAD and commander of NORAD Canadian Element. While testifying for the defence committee of the House of Commons of Canada in September 2017, St-Amand stated that "the extant U.S. policy is not to defend Canada" from a missile attack, a claim that attracted media controversy. St-Amand retired from the RCAF and was replaced by Lieutenant General Christopher J. Coates at his NORAD post in July 2018.

== Awards and decorations ==
St-Amand's personal awards and decorations include the following:

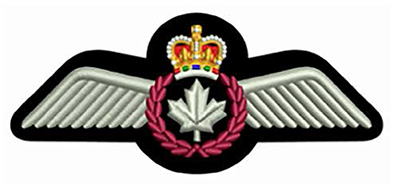

Ribbon	Description	Notes
	Order of Military Merit (CMM)	Commander 10 October 2014; Officer 24 November 2009
	Canadian Forces' Decoration (CD)	With 2 Clasps
	Alberta Centennial Medal	24 March 2005

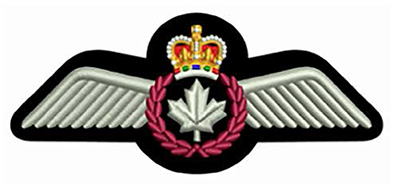
- He was a qualified RCAF Pilot and as such wore the RCAF Flight wings
- Command Commendation

== Notes ==
Military offices
Preceded by Alain Parent	Deputy Commander of the North American Aerospace Defense Command; 1 July 2015 – 20 July 2018	Succeeded by Christopher J. Coates
