= Kenneth J. Thorneycroft =

Canadian Forces Air Command officer (1928–2018)

- Born: March 24, 1928; Swift Current, Saskatchewan, Canada
- Died: May 4, 2018 (aged 90); Ottawa, Ontario, Canada
- Military career
- Allegiance: Canada
- Branch: Canadian Forces Air Command
- Rank: Lieutenant-General

Kenneth John Thorneycroft (March 24, 1928 – May 4, 2018) was a Canadian Forces Air Command officer. He served as deputy commander of NORAD from 1980 to 1983. He died in 2018.

Military offices
Preceded by Kenneth E. Lewis	Deputy Commander of the North American Aerospace Defense Command; 24 June 1980 – 25 May 1983	Succeeded by Donald C. MacKenzie
