= David O'Blenis =

Canadian air force general (born 1940)

J. David O'Blenis
- Born: c. 1940; Salisbury, New Brunswick
- Died: November 18, 2018 (aged 77–78)
- Military career
- Allegiance: Canada
- Branch: Royal Canadian Air Force
- Rank: Lieutenant-General

James David O'Blenis (born 1940) was a Royal Canadian Air Force officer. He served as a deputy commander of NORAD from 1994 to 1995.

Military offices
Preceded by Brian L. Smith	Deputy Commander of the North American Aerospace Defense Command; 2 August 1994 – 7 August 1995	Succeeded by L.W.F. Cuppens
