= Brian L. Smith =

Canadian air force general (born 1939)

- Born: April 22, 1939 (age 87); Winnipeg, Manitoba
- Military career
- Allegiance: Canada
- Branch: Royal Canadian Air Force
- Rank: Lieutenant-General

LGen Brian Lachlan Melville Smith CMM CD (born April 22, 1939) was a Royal Canadian Air Force officer. He served as Commander of Canadian Forces Europe from 1989 to 1992 and as Deputy Commander in Chief of NORAD from 1992 to 1994.

Military offices
Preceded by Robert W. Morton	Deputy Commander of the North American Aerospace Defense Command; 3 August 1992 – 1 August 1994	Succeeded by J. D. O'Blenis
