= HMCS Iroquois =

Two Canadian naval ships have been named HMCS Iroquois:

- HMCS Iroquois (G89), a Second World War Tribal-class destroyer. She was in commission between 1942–1946 and 1951–1962. She was scrapped in 1966.
- HMCS Iroquois (DDG 280), an Iroquois-class (or New-Tribal-class) destroyer commissioned in 1972. She was decommissioned in 2015 and scrapped in 2016.

== Battle honours ==
Ships named Iroquois have earned the following battle honours;

- Atlantic, 1943
- Arctic, 1943–1945
- Biscay, 1943–1944
- Norway, 1945
- Korea, 1952–1953
- Arabian Sea
