= Christopher J. Coates =

Canadian air force general

Christopher Coates
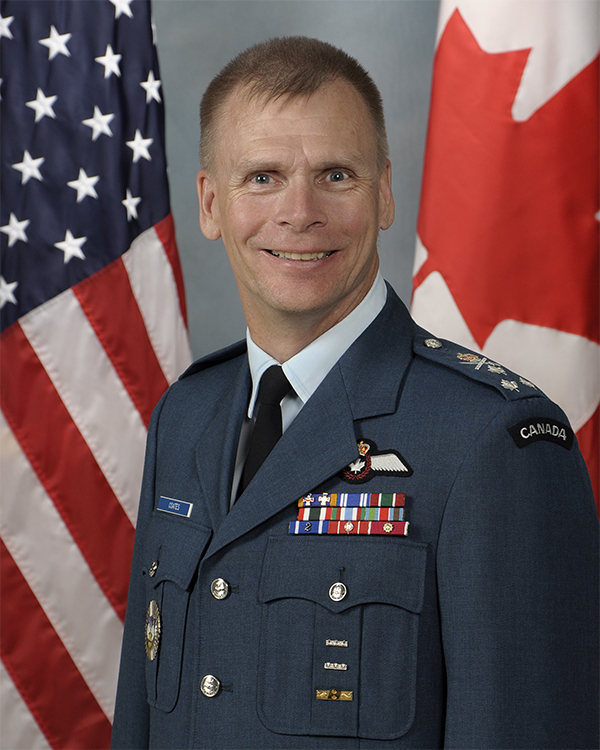
- Military career
- Allegiance: Canada
- Branch: Royal Canadian Air Force (Note: Known as Air Command until 2011)
- Service years: 1988 – 2021
- Rank: Lieutenant-general
- Units: 427 Helicopter Squadron; 10 Tactical Air Group
- Commands: Canadian Joint Operations Command; North American Aerospace Defense Command (Deputy); 427 Special Operations Aviation Squadron
- Conflicts: Afghanistan War; Kosovo War; Operation Artemis; Operation Hestia; Operation Central
- Awards: Commander of the Order of Military Merit; Meritorious Service Medal; Canadian Forces' Decoration and Bar

Lieutenant-General Christopher J. Coates CMM MSM CD is a former military officer of the Royal Canadian Air Force. In July 2020, he replaced Lieutenant-General Michael Rouleau as commander of Canadian Joint Operations Command. From July 2018 until July 2020, he was the deputy commander of North American Aerospace Defense Command succeeding Lieutenant-General Pierre St-Amand.

== Education and Training ==
He graduated from post-secondary education at the University of Calgary in chemistry and biochemistry.

He finished his training as a pilot upon joining the RCAF, and started as a reconnaissance pilot flying light observation helicopters with 444 Squadron in Lahr, Germany, 430 Squadron in Valcartier, Québec, 408 Squadron in Edmonton, Alberta and 427 Squadron in Petawawa, Ontario.

== Career and Retirement ==
He was the operations officer with 10 Tactical Air Group in St Hubert, and the director of CAOC in Winnipeg, 1 Wing in Kingston.

On March 22, 2021, Coates announced his retirement from the Canadian Armed Forces. The announcement came after Defence Minister Harjit Sajjan halted Coates planned promotion to lead the NATO Joint Force Command in Naples, Italy, following revelations that Coates had an extramarital affair with an American civilian in Colorado during his tenure as Deputy Commander of NORAD. The Department of National Defence ruled that Coates did not violate any rules of conduct, with Coates having reported the affair at the time to Canadian and American officials.

Coates is currently the Director of Foreign Affairs, National Defence and National Security at the Macdonald–Laurier Institute.

== Notes ==
Military offices
Preceded by Pierre St-Amand	Deputy Commander of the North American Aerospace Defense Command; 21 July 2020 – 2 June 2023	Succeeded by Alain Pelletier
