= Reginald J. Lane =

Royal Canadian Air Force officer (1920–2003)

Reg Lane
- Born: 4 January 1920; Victoria, British Columbia
- Died: 2 October 2003 (aged 83); Victoria, British Columbia
- Military career
- Allegiance: Canada
- Branch: Royal Canadian Air Force
- Rank: Lieutenant-General

Reginald John Lane (4 January 1920 – 2 October 2003) was a Royal Canadian Air Force officer. He served as deputy commander of NORAD from 1972 to 1974.

Military offices
Preceded by Edwin Reyno	Deputy Commander of the North American Aerospace Defense Command; 1 September 1972 – 1 October 1974	Succeeded by Richard C. Stovel
