= Robert W. Morton =

Canadian air force officer (1937–2002)

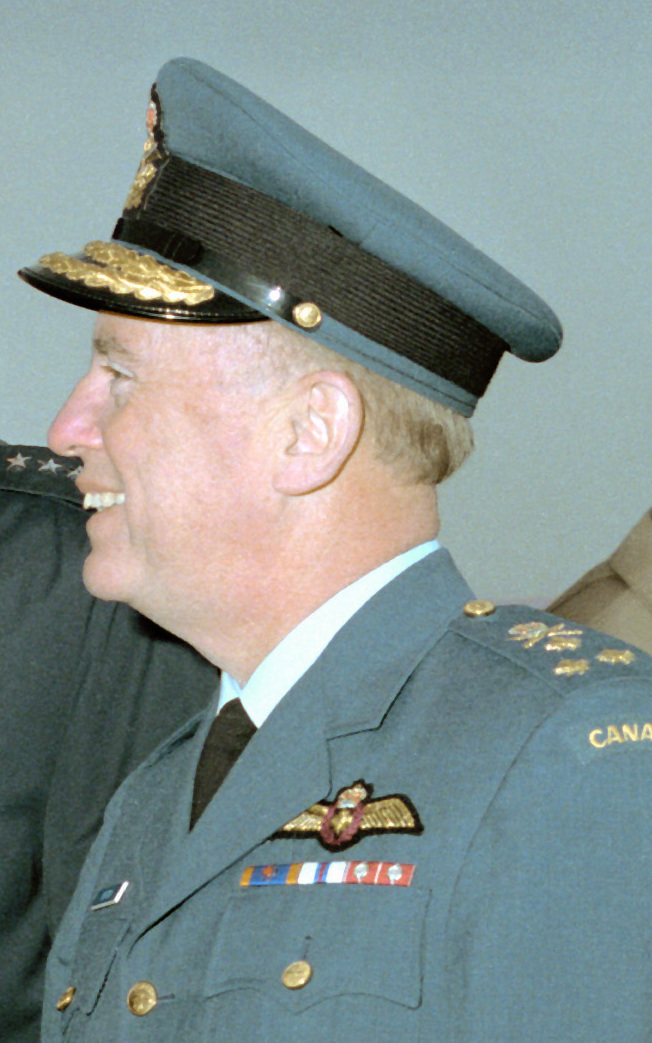
- Morton in 1991
- Born: March 27, 1937; Almonte, Ontario
- Died: December 7, 2002 (aged 65); Ottawa, Ontario
- Military career
- Allegiance: Canada
- Branch: Royal Canadian Air Force
- Rank: Lieutenant-General

Robert Wayne Morton (March 23, 1937 – December 7, 2002) was a Royal Canadian Air Force officer. He served as deputy commander of NORAD from 1989 to 1992.

Military offices
Preceded by Donald M. McNaughton	Deputy Commander of the North American Aerospace Defense Command; 11 August 1989 – 2 August 1992	Succeeded by Brian L. Smith
