= 403 Helicopter Operational Training Squadron =

Canadian military flying unit

No. 403 Squadron RCAF
- Active: 1941 to Present
- Country: Canada
- Branch: (Canada) Royal Canadian Air Force
- Mottos: Stalk and Strike
- Battle honours: Defence of Britain 1941–1944; English Channel and North Sea 1942; Fortress Europe 1941–44; Dieppe; France and Germany 1944–45; Normandy 1944; Rhine.

Insignia
- Squadron Badge heraldry: A Wolf's head, caboshed
- Squadron Codes: KH (Mar 1941 – May 1945 )

Aircraft flown
- Fighter: Curtiss P-40 Warhawk, Supermarine Spitfire, North American P-51 Mustang
- Helicopter: CH-135 Twin Huey, CH-136 Kiowa, Bell CH-146 Griffon
- Trainer: Canadair CT-133 Silver Star
- Transport: Beechcraft Model 18, de Havilland Canada DHC-3 Otter

403 "City of Calgary" (Helicopter) Operational Training Squadron (403 Sqn) is a squadron of the Royal Canadian Air Force (RCAF) located at Canadian Forces Base Gagetown. It is equipped with Bell CH-146 Griffons and provides operational aircrew training to the crews who will fly the helicopter. The squadron also conducts operational test and evaluation, develops aviation tactics and carries out operations in support of the 1 Wing mission. It also supports the local Army requirements of the Combat Training Centre. It was founded as No. 403 Squadron RCAF.

A pilot will spend three months at Gagetown learning to fly the Griffon before being posted to one of 1 Wing's five operational squadrons. While at Gagetown, pilots learn advanced aircraft handling, including slinging and hoisting, tactical formation, flying and low-level tactical flying.

== History ==
=== World War II ===
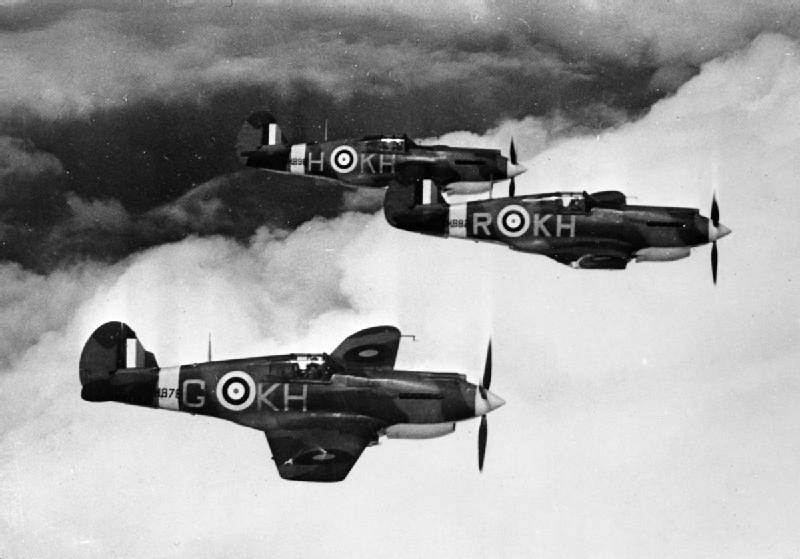
403 Sqn Curtiss Tomahawk I in July 1941.

No. 403 (Fighter) Squadron RCAF was formed at RAF Station Baginton (now Coventry Airport), Warwickshire, England, on 1 March 1941.

The first squadron of the Royal Canadian Air Force (RCAF) formed overseas under the British Commonwealth Air Training Plan (BCATP), it was identified by the letters KH.

Initially equipped with the Curtiss Tomahawk I, they were replaced with the Supermarine Spitfire after only 29 operational sorties. Through continual replacement and updating, the squadron flew various models, Mk I through Mk XVI, of this very popular aircraft.

It was flying a Mk IX Spitfire in 1943 that ace George "Screwball" Beurling scored his 30th air victory while flying with the squadron.

The squadron served in RAF Fighter Command and Second Tactical Air Force for over four years.

By May 1945, the squadron had a record of 123 enemy aircraft destroyed, with a share in seven more, 10 probably destroyed, and 72 damaged with a share in one more. Ground targets destroyed or damaged included 30 tanks, 50 locomotives, and nearly 100 other vehicles.

Sixteen Distinguished Flying Crosses (DFC), four DFC with Bar, and one Military Medal were awarded to members of the squadron, in addition to a number of Mentions in Despatch.

The "Wolf" Squadron and many other units paid a high price in lives and aircraft. Eighty-five aircraft were destroyed. 76 pilots were reported missing; of these, four were killed, 39 presumed dead, 21 captured, and nine successfully evaded capture.

=== Battle honours ===
The squadron has been awarded seven battle honours for its wartime service:

- Defence of Britain 1941–1944
- English Channel and North Sea 1942
- Fortress Europe 1941–1944
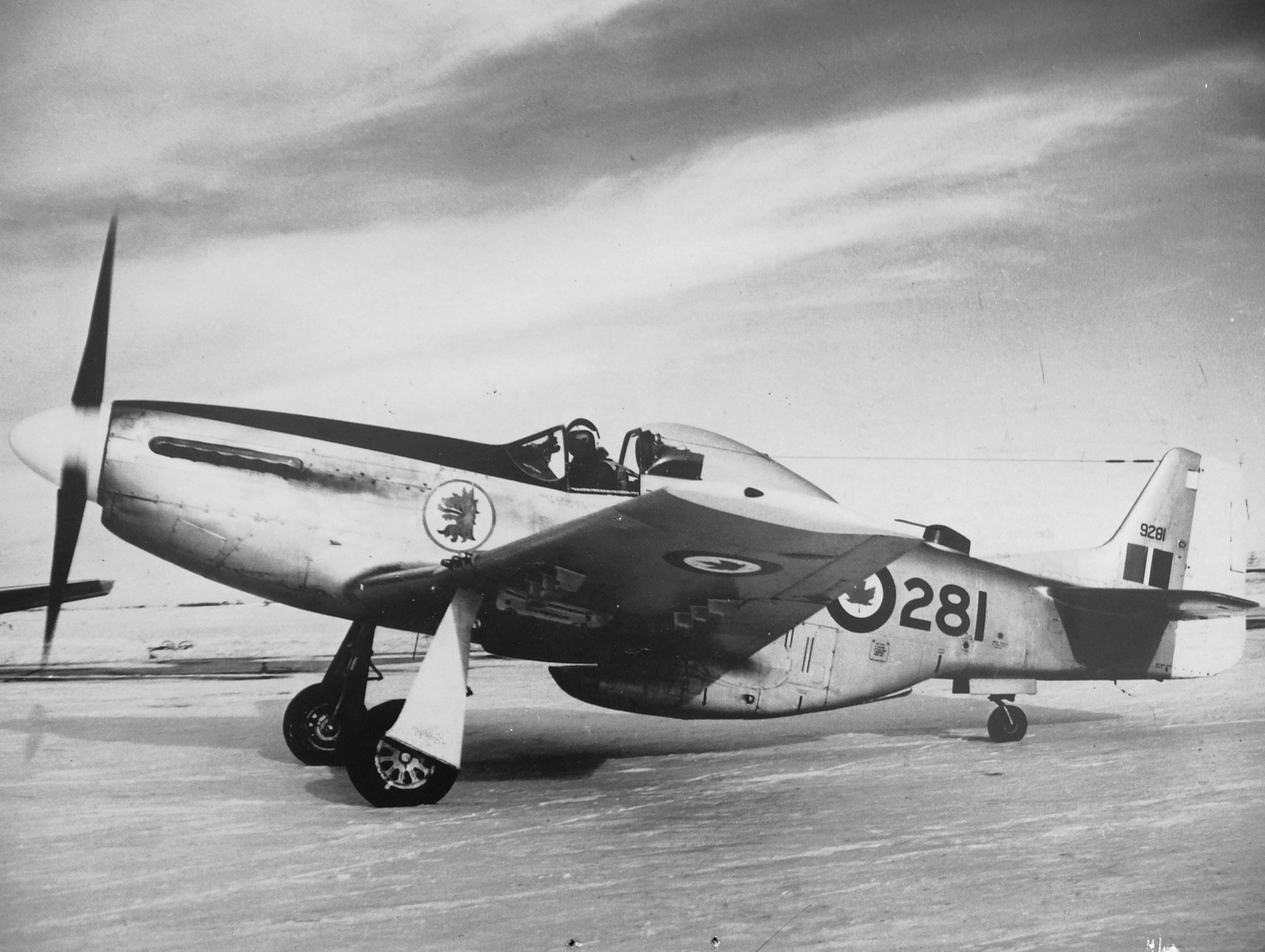
  F/O Lynn Garrison with 403 Squadron 9281, 1956.
- France and Germany 1944–1945
- Normandy 1944
- Dieppe 1944
- Rhine 1944

=== Post-war period ===
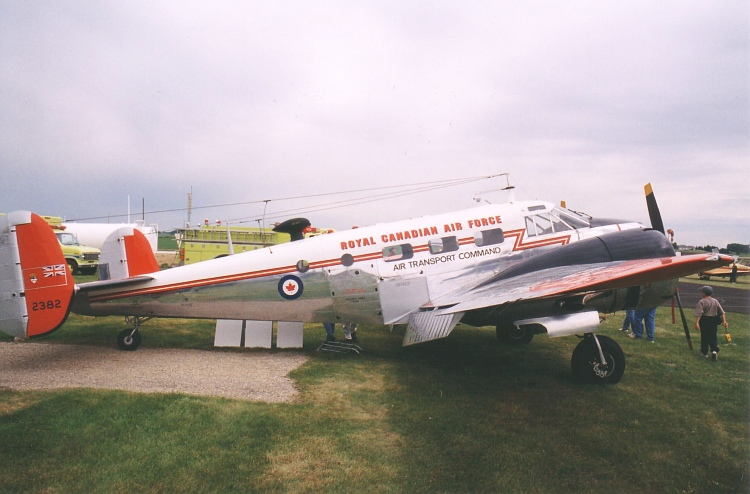
C-45 Expeditor

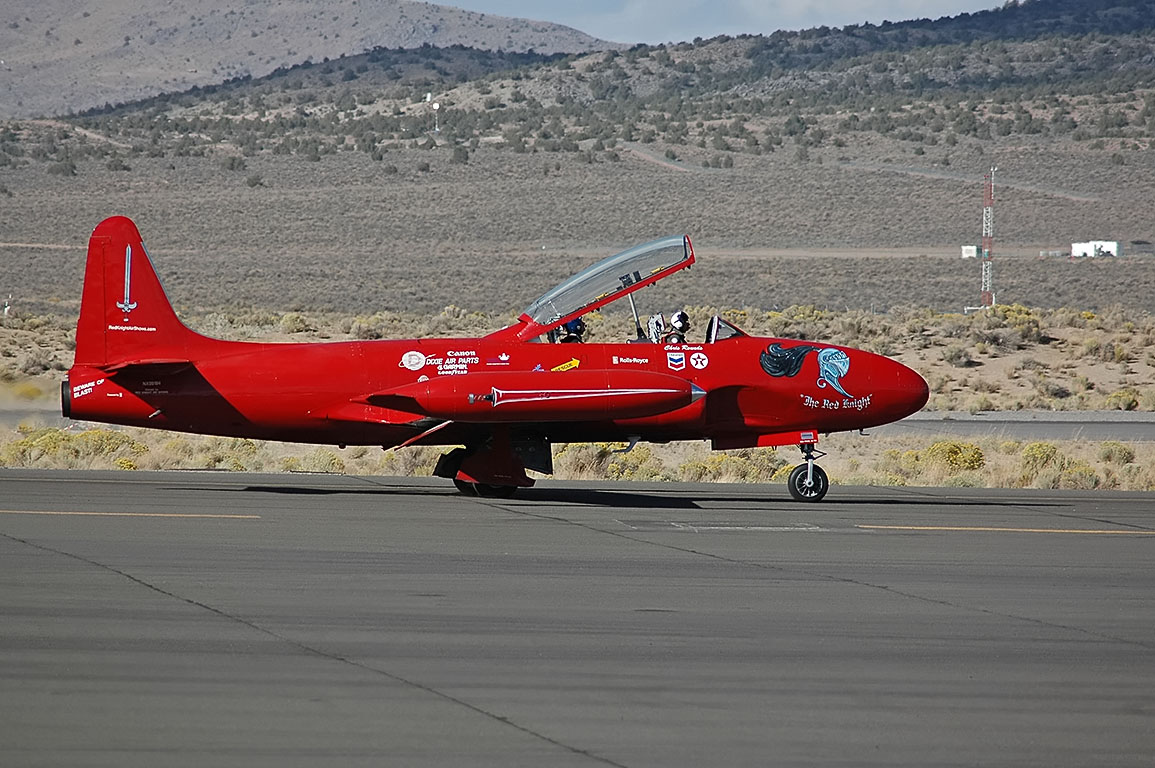
Canadair CT-133 Silver Star

Early in 1948, ex-Air Force officers in Calgary pressed for the formation of an Auxiliary Squadron in the city.

An active campaign was undertaken and, in June 1948, the reformation, effective 15 October 1948, of 403 Auxiliary Squadron with a Fighter-Bomber designation was announced. Its primary role would be close support to the Army.

Early pilots were highly experienced veterans with operational experience on a variety of aircraft.

The reformed squadron was equipped with the Harvard MK II, and received the first of its North American P-51D Mustangs in the latter part of 1950. It would remain in service until 1958 when the type was retired from RCAF service. F/O Lynn Garrison was the last 403 pilot to fly the Mustang.

In January 1952, the squadron enlisted its first female officer, P/O V.A. Harding. In September 1952, "City of Calgary" was incorporated into the squadron's title.

In November 1953, the squadron's title was changed to "Fighter" Squadron. In October 1955 the squadron received its first jet, the Canadair CT-133 Silver Star.

In June 1956, the squadron was informed that its role was to change and that it would be re-equipped with the C-45 Expediter and the DHC-3 Otter. In addition, it would move to Air Transport, and receive its first Navigator.

The squadron transferred to Training Command, in December 1956, with the role of training a reserve of transport aircrew for the Auxiliary and Regular Forces.

In February 1958, the squadron became a general Transport and Rescue Squadron responsible for operations in support of military and civilian requirements.

During the summer of 1961, the squadron was advised that consideration was being given to equipping the Auxiliary units with helicopters. Nothing came of it but, for the squadron, it was a sign of things to come.

=== Activated as Operational Training Squadron ===
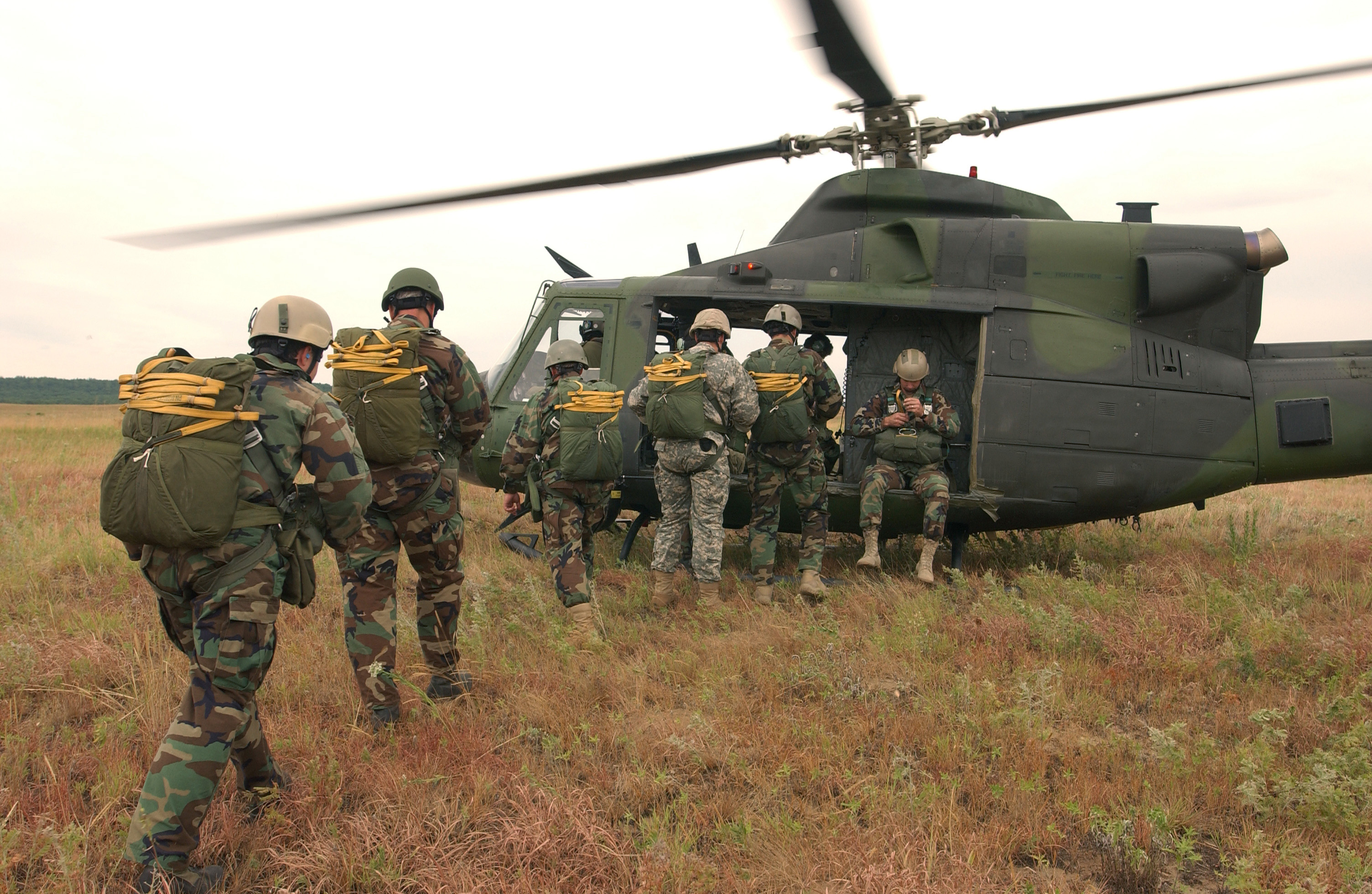
Bell CH-146 Griffon.

In January 1968, the squadron was activated as 403 (Helicopter) Operational Training Squadron (Hel) OTS at Canadian Forces Base (CFB) Petawawa and was equipped with 10 CUH-1H helicopters. Once again, it was formed specifically to support the Land Forces.

In July 1972, the squadron was given the role of training of aircrew and technical personnel for the Tactical Helicopter and Rescue Squadrons.

To carry out its new role, the squadron joined 422 Squadron at CFB Gagetown and was equipped with 11 CH-135 Twin Huey and 10 CH-136 Kiowa helicopters. In August 1980, the squadron gained aircrew and support personnel from the disbandment of 422 Squadron.

In August 1980, the Air Ground Operations School was formed to provide advance training for future Flight Commanders and Operations Officers. Renamed Aviation Tactics Flight in June 1995, the Flight continues to provide this training, and aviation support to the Combat Training Centre, 1 Wing and the Air Force.

As a Rotary Wing Aviation Unit, the squadron conducted two rotations of the Multinational Force and Observers.

=== Renewing Air Reserve relationship ===
In July 1990, the squadron renewed its post-war relationship with the Air Reserves. At that time the Combat Training Centre (CTC) Gagetown Detachment of the CFB Chatham Air Reserve Augmentation Flight (ARAF) took up residence in the squadron. The flight became an integral part of the Squadron in 1996.

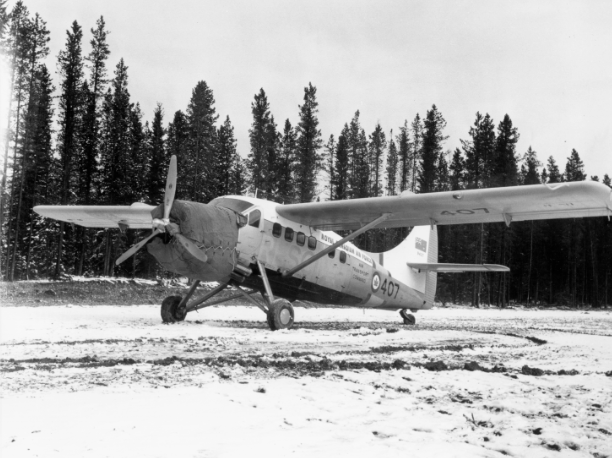
403 RCAF Squadron Otter, Burnt Stick Lake, Alberta 1963

Renamed the Air Reserve Section in 1998, the squadron's reservists are incorporated into and provide support to all flights.

In August 1992 the Land Aviation Test and Evaluation Flight (LATEF) was formed to conduct, on behalf of 10 Tactical Air Group (10 TAG), operational and tactical testing of land aviation helicopter systems and support equipment, and to propose operational and tactical doctrine where applicable. It quickly evolved into a valuable asset and has been integrally involved in the testing and improvement of CH-146 Griffon systems.

The Kiowa and Twin Huey were phased out of the squadron by the end of 1994 and early 1995 respectively and were replaced by the CH-146 Griffon in March 1995.

The squadron became the first operational CH-146 unit in 10 TAG in October 1995.

In October 1996, a full motion flight simulator was added to the squadron's establishment.

== Badges ==
403 Squadron Helicopter Operational Training Squadron badge 1982
