= HMCS Iroquois (DDG 280) =

Former destroyer of the Royal Canadian Navy

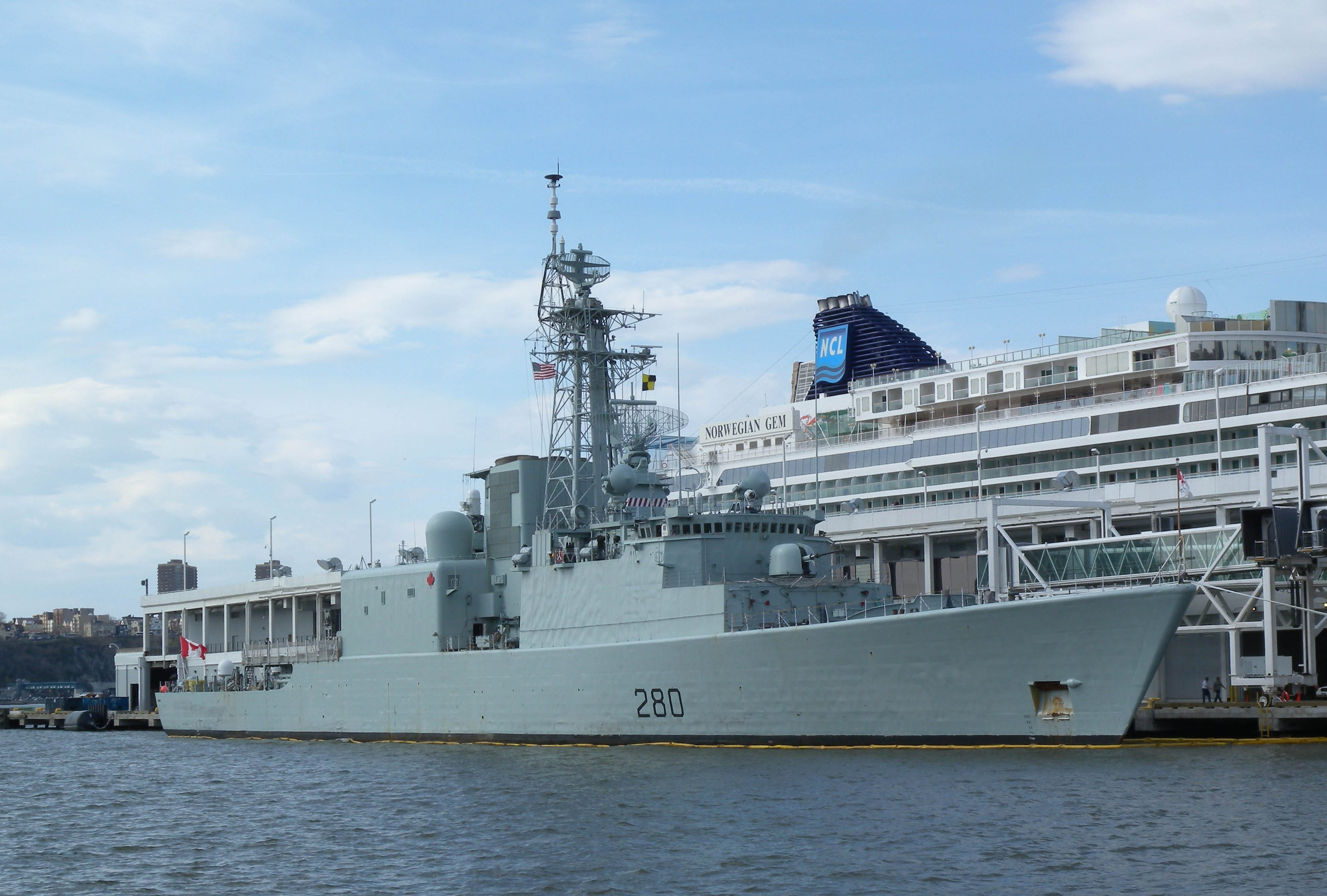
- Iroquois in 2009

History

Canada
- Name: Iroquois
- Namesake: Iroquois
- Builder: Marine Industries Ltd., Sorel
- Laid down: 15 January 1969
- Launched: 28 November 1970
- Commissioned: 29 July 1972
- Decommissioned: 1 May 2015
- Refit: 3 July 1992
- Home port: CFB Halifax
- Identification: MMSI number: 316126000; Callsign: CZGD
- Motto: Relentless in chase
- Honours and awards: Atlantic, 1943; Arctic, 1943–1945; Biscay, 1943–44; Norway, 1945; Korea, 1952–53, Arabian Sea
- Fate: Scrapped 2016
- Notes: Colours:Gold and black
- Badge: Or, the head of an Iroquois brave, couped at the base of the neck, properly coloured and wearing two eagle feathers in his hair and a gold ring pendant from the ear.

General characteristics
- Class & type: Iroquois-class destroyer
- Displacement: 5100 t
- Length: 129.8 m (425.9 ft)
- Beam: 15.2 m (49.9 ft)
- Draught: 4.7 m (15.4 ft)
- Propulsion: COGOG – 2 shaft; 2 × Allison 570-KF cruise gas turbines (5.6 MW); 2 × Pratt & Whitney FT4A-2 boost gas turbines (37 MW)
- Speed: 29 kn (53.7 km/h)
- Range: 4,500 nmi (8,334.0 km)
- Complement: 280
- Sensors & processing systems: Signaal AN/SPQ 501 DA-08 radar; Signaal LW-08 AN/SPQ 502 radar; SQS-510 hull sonar; SQS-510 VDS sonar
- Armament: 29 × VLS, Standard SM-2MR Block IIIA SAMs; 1 × 76 mm/62 OTO Melara; 6 × 12.75 in tubes firing Mark-46 Mod 5 torpedoes; 1 × Phalanx CIWS (Block 1); 6 × M2 Browning machine guns
- Aircraft carried: 2 × CH-124 Sea King helicopters
- Aviation facilities: hangar and flight deck

HMCS Iroquois was the lead ship of the Iroquois-class destroyers of the Royal Canadian Navy, also known as the Tribal class or the 280 class. The second vessel to carry the name, she carried the hull number DDG 280. Entering service in 1972 she was assigned to Maritime Forces Atlantic (MARLANT) and was homeported at CFB Halifax. Iroquois was deployed overseas for blockade and anti-terrorism duties, including participating in Operation Apollo in 2002–03. Taken out of service in 2014 and paid off in 2015.

Iroquois was an area air defence destroyer. She served on MARLANT missions protecting Canada's sovereignty in the Atlantic Ocean and enforcing Canadian laws in its territorial sea and Exclusive Economic Zone. Iroquois was deployed on missions throughout the Atlantic and to the Indian Ocean; specifically the Persian Gulf and Arabian Sea on anti-terrorism operations. She has also deployed on counter-narcotics operations in the Caribbean Basin. The destroyer participated in several NATO missions, patrolling the Atlantic Ocean as part of Standing Naval Force Atlantic (STANAVFORLANT) and its successor Standing NATO Response Force Maritime Group 1 (SNMG1).

== Service history ==
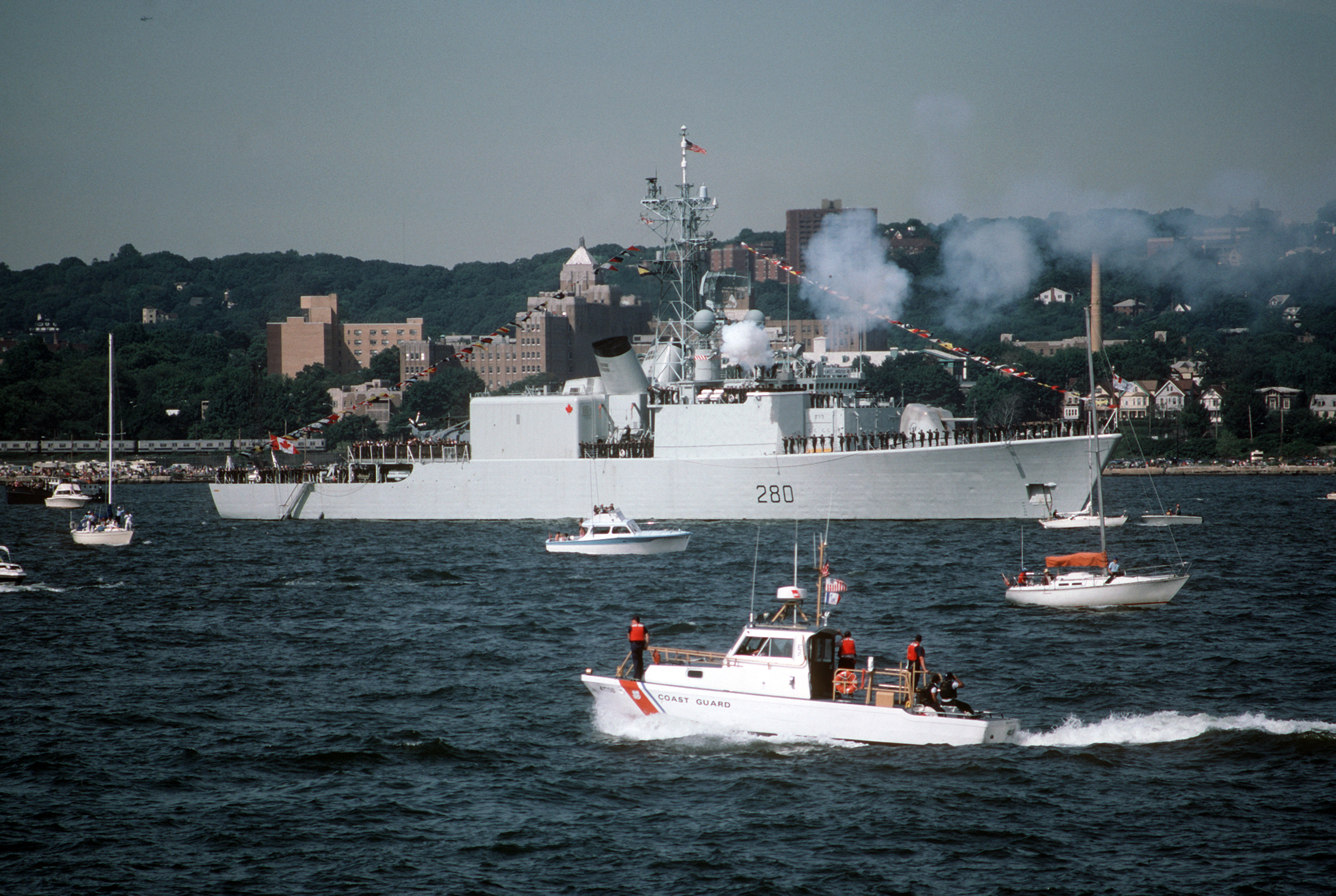
Iroquois at New York before her TRUMP refit, in 1986.

The destroyer's keel was laid down on 15 January 1969 by Marine Industries at their yard in Sorel, Quebec. The ship was launched on 28 November 1970 and Iroquois was commissioned on 29 July 1972 with the hull number DDH 280, the first of four Iroquois-class destroyers .

In 1978, the destroyer took part in naval exercises off Portugal and Denmark. On 4 December 1983, the ship responded to the merchant vessel Ho Ming 5's SOS. Iroquois rescued the crew of the vessel, which was in danger of capsizing in gale-force winds. Iroquois was a flagship of STANAVFORLANT in 1978–79.

On 1 November 1989 Iroquois began the Tribal Class Update and Modernization Project (TRUMP) refit, transforming her into a modern area air defence platform with state of the art weapons, sensors, and command and control systems. The refit was completed on 3 July 1992, upon which the ship's hull number changed to DDG 280. Iroquois deployed to the Adriatic Sea from 25 September 1993 to 25 April 1994 as part of the blockade force enforcing sanctions on Yugoslavia. During this period, Iroquois succeeded sister ship Algonquin as flagship of STANAVFORLANT. While in the Adriatic, the vessels would board and inspect vessels travelling to Yugoslavia. Iroquois intercepted a vessel attempting to evade the blockade carrying tanks and ammunition.

On 17 June 1995, Iroquois was made the flagship of Maritime Operations Group 1. In the late 1990s, Iroquois became the first warship of Maritime Forces to integrate women into the crew. On 21 March 2000, the destroyer was sent to aid the bulk carrier Leader L which had sunk northeast of Bermuda. Iroquois rescued thirteen survivors and the remains of six others. After the September 11 attacks on the United States by terrorists, Iroquois, which was at sea operating off eastern North America, was used to track aircraft entering North American airspace for NORAD.

Operation Apollo was created to support the United States invasion of Afghanistan. A naval task group was formed, which Iroquois was made flagship of on 17 October. The task group was composed of Iroquois, the auxiliary vessel Preserver and frigates Halifax and Charlottetown. All the ships with the exception of Halifax sailed from Halifax on 24 October. Iroquois, Charlottetown and Preserver arrived in theatre on 20 November. Iroquois was later incorporated into a US amphibious ready group for escort duties for United States Marine Corps transports positioned close to Pakistan. The destroyer returned to Halifax on 27 April 2002.

After the US invaded Iraq in 2003, Commodore Roger Girouard was given command of Task Force 151, comprising ships of allied nations who chose not to join the Iraq War but continued to support the War in Afghanistan. Fredericton was the next Canadian ship slated to deploy to the theatre. However, Commodore Girouard requested Iroquois be sent instead, due to the vessel's flagship accommodations and better communications equipment. In order to accommodate the request, MARLANT reassigned Fredericton's helicopter and aircrew to Iroquois, allowing the destroyer to sail on 24 February. However, on 27 February, the Sea King crashed into the ship's deck, forcing Iroquois to return to Halifax. The destroyer sailed with Fredericton on 5 March bound for the Persian Gulf, this time with no helicopter. Iroquois departed the theatre in June.

In August 2006, the destroyer was assigned to Standing NATO Maritime Group 1 as flagship. In 2008 Iroquois was Flagship of CTF 150, accompanied by Calgary and Protecteur, deployed to the waters off Somalia throughout the Arabian sea, and Persian Gulf. The multi-national task force Supported the war on terror, and the Afgan Mission by combatting drug, human smuggling and piracy in the region. In 2012, Iroquois was among the Canadian warships sent to the Caribbean Sea to help stem the flow of illegal drugs into North America as part of Operation Caribbe.

After rust was found in a machinery space, coupled with structural cracks in the hull of the destroyer, Iroquois was laid up at Halifax in mid-April 2014. The decision to discard the vessel was taken in September 2014 and Iroquois was paid off on 1 May 2015. On 24 November 2016 the destroyer was towed out of Halifax harbour en route to Liverpool, Nova Scotia to be broken up for scrap.
