= Lieutenant-general (Canada) =

Military rank

Lieutenant-General Lieutenant-général
- Shoulder insignia Left: Army; Right: Air Force
- Country: Canada
- Service branch: Canadian Army; Royal Canadian Air Force
- Abbreviation: LGen
- NATO rank code: OF-8
- Next higher rank: General (or Admiral)
- Next lower rank: Major-General
- Equivalent ranks: Vice-Admiral (Royal Canadian Navy)

Lieutenant-general (LGen; French: lieutenant-général [Lgén]) is a Canadian Forces rank used by commissioned officers of the Canadian Army or Royal Canadian Air Force. Vice-admiral is the equivalent rank in the Royal Canadian Navy.

A lieutenant-general is a general officer, senior to a major general or rear-admiral, and junior to a general or admiral. Prior to the 1968 unification of the Canadian Forces, Royal Canadian Air Force officers held the equivalent rank of air marshal.

== Insignia ==
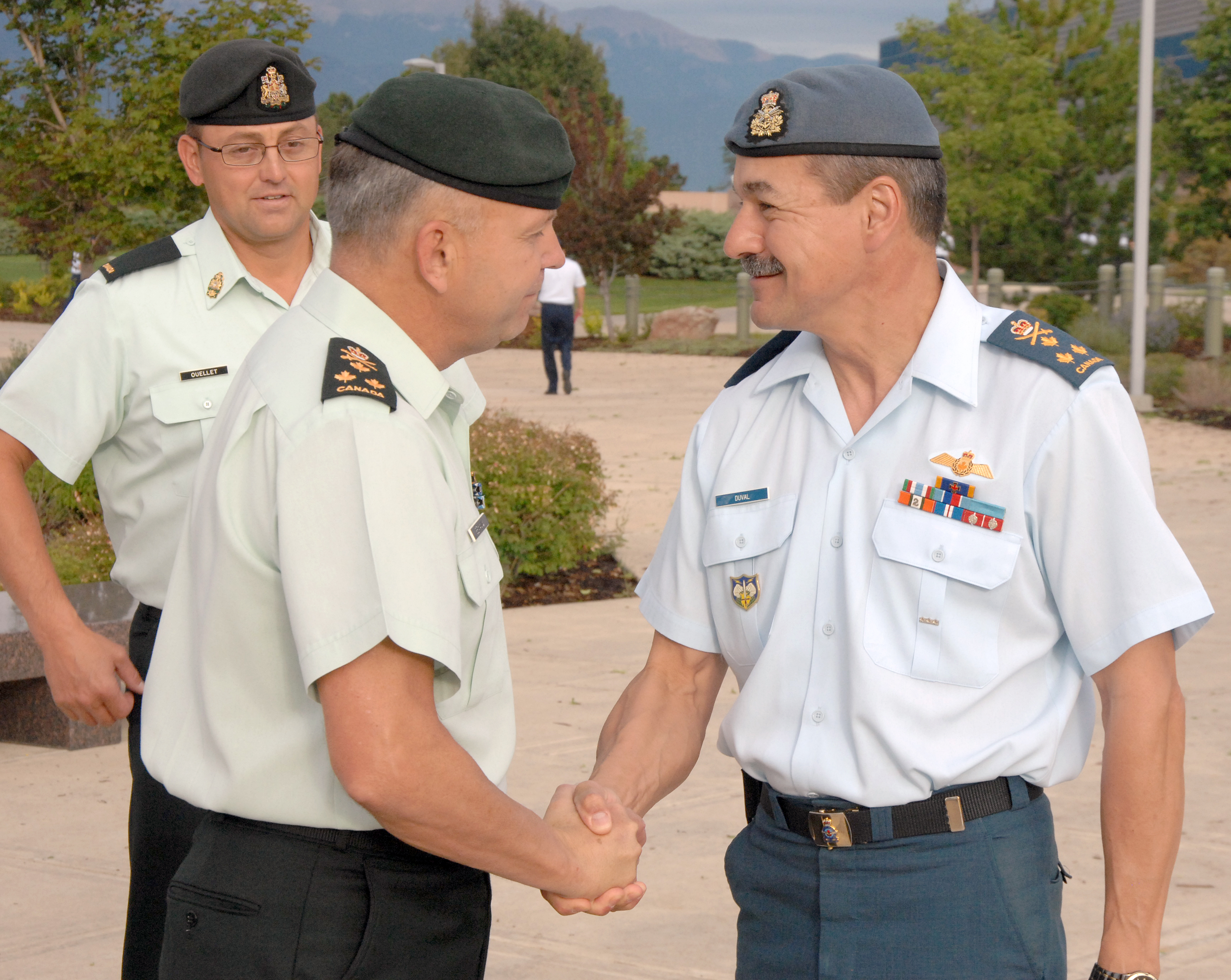
Canadian Air Force and Army lieutenant-generals shaking hands

The rank insignia for a lieutenant-general in the Royal Canadian Air Force is a wide braid below two narrow braid on the cuff, as well as three silver maple leaves, beneath crossed sword and baton, all surmounted by St. Edward's Crown, worn on the shoulder straps of the service dress tunic. In the Canadian Army, the rank insignia is a wide braid on the cuff, as well as three gold maple leaves, beneath crossed sword and baton, all surmounted by St. Edward's Crown, worn on the shoulder straps of the service dress tunic. The rank is also worn on slip-ons on other uniforms. On the visor of the service cap are two rows of gold oak leaves.

Army uniform variations

Dress uniform tunic - shoulder and sleeve

CADPAT uniform

Arid-region CADPAT uniform

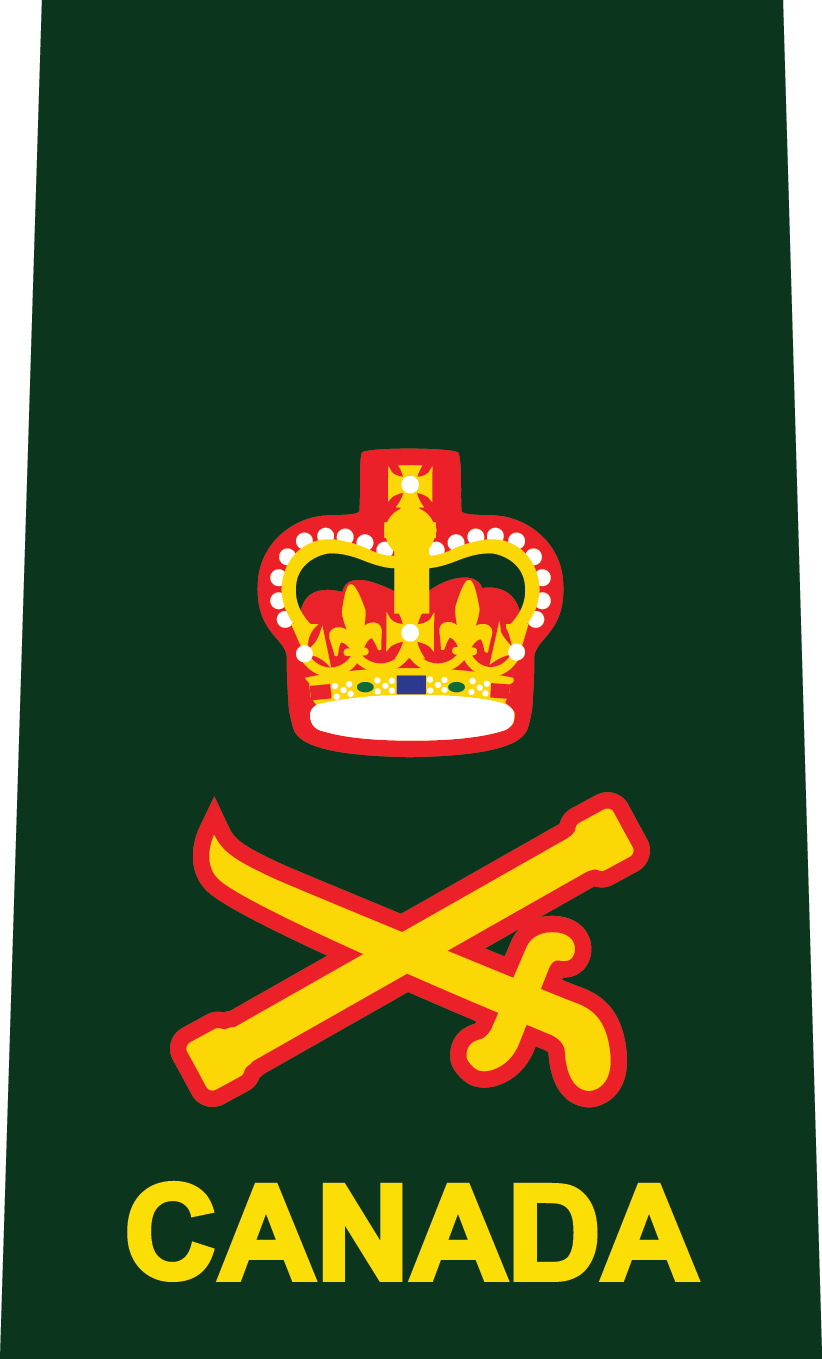
Insignia used from 2013 to 2016 on uniform shirts

Olive green uniform (no longer in use)
Air Force uniform variations

Dress uniform tunic - shoulder and sleeve

Uniform shirts (old insignia)

CADPAT uniform

== Forms of address ==
Lieutenant-generals may be addressed verbally as general [name], as are all general officer ranks; thereafter by subordinates as sir or ma'am, as applicable. In French, subordinates thereafter use the expression général. Lieutenant-generals are normally entitled to staff cars.

== Appointments ==
Lieutenant-generals usually hold senior command or administrative appointments. Appointments held by lieutenant-generals may include vice chief of the Defence Staff (VCDS); Deputy Chief of the Defence Staff (DCDS); commander of the Canadian Army and commander of the Royal Canadian Air Force.

In November 2009, Prince Charles (now King Charles III) became an honorary lieutenant-general of the Canadian Forces.

In June 2015, Second World War veteran Richard Rohmer was promoted to the rank of honorary lieutenant-general in his capacity as honorary advisor to the Chief of the Defence Staff.

== See also ==
- Canadian Forces ranks and insignia
