= Public Works Construction Act =

1934 Act of the Parliament of Canada

Parliament of Canada
- Long title: An Act to provide for the construction and improvement of certain public works and undertakings throughout Canada
- Enacted by: Parliament of Canada
- Assented to: July 3, 1934

The Public Works Construction Act (French: Loi sur les travaux publics) was enacted in 1934 by the Parliament of Canada, providing $40 million in assistance during the Great Depression. Its intention was to accelerate recovery to more normal economic conditions, provide employment and thereby reduce expenditures for relief purposes.

Public works projects included many construction projects in Canada's national parks and historic sites, such as building the replica Port Royal Habitation in Nova Scotia's Port Royal National Historic Site. In Banff National Park, projects included construction of a new registration facility at Banff's east gate, and construction of an administrative building in Banff. The Act provided continued funding and expanded on funding that was available in the 1931 Unemployment and Farm Relief Act.
