= Simpson Pass =

Mountain pass on the BC-Alberta border

- Location within Alberta Location within British Columbia
- Elevation: 2,107 metres (6,913 ft)

Third Approach
- Location: Alberta and British Columbia, Canada
- Range: Canadian Rockies
- Coordinates: 51°04′51″N 115°49′47″W
- Topo map: NTS 82O4 Banff

Simpson Pass, el. 2,107 m (6,913 ft), is a mountain pass on the border between the Canadian provinces of Alberta and British Columbia, in the area of the Ball Range. It is the prominence col for Mount Ball on the Continental Divide in the vicinity of Sunshine Village ski resort. Simpson River and Simpson Pass are named after Sir George Simpson who first explored the area in 1841.

The British Columbian side (Mount Assiniboine Provincial Park) is drained by the Simpson River, via its tributary the North Simpson River to the Kootenay River and then the Columbia River to the Pacific Ocean. The drainage on the Alberta side (Banff National Park) is Healy Creek to the Bow River, then into the Saskatchewan River system to Lake Winnipeg and finally Hudson Bay and the Arctic Ocean.

== See also ==
- List of Rocky Mountain passes on the continental divide
