= Gus Edwards =

Gus Edwards may refer to:

- Gus Edwards (vaudevillian) (1878–1945), American songwriter and vaudevillian
- Harold Edwards (RCAF officer) (1892–1952), Royal Canadian Air Force air marshal, also known as Gus Edwards
- Gus Edwards (American football) (born 1995), American football running back
