= Banff National Park =

National park in Alberta, Canada

- Parc national Banff
- IUCN category II (national park)
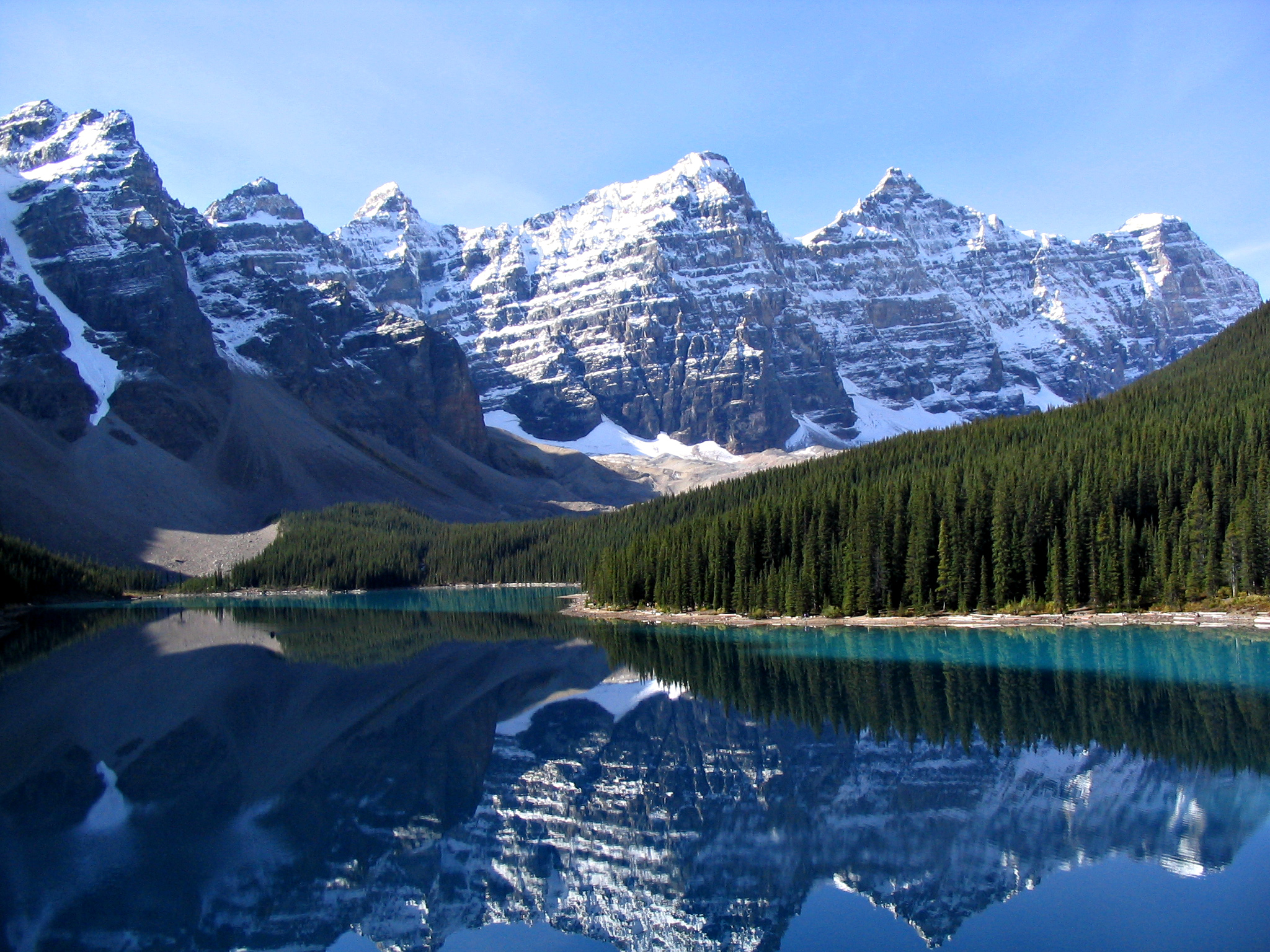
- Moraine Lake and the Valley of the Ten Peaks

- Location within Canada Location within Alberta
- Interactive map of Banff National Park
- Location: Alberta's Rockies, Alberta, Canada
- Nearest town: Within the park: Banff; Castle Junction; Lake Louise; Nearest outside the park: Canmore
- Coordinates: 51.5°N 116.0°W
- Area: 6,641 km^{2} (2,564 sq mi)
- Established: 25 November 1885
- Visitors: 4,558,171 (in 2025–26)
- Governing body: Parks Canada
- Website: parks.canada.ca/pn-np/ab/banff

UNESCO World Heritage Site
- Part of: Canadian Rocky Mountain Parks
- Criteria: Natural: (vii), (viii)
- Reference: 304
- Inscription: 1984 (8th Session)

Banff National Park is Canada's first national park, established in 1885 as Rocky Mountains Park. Located in Alberta's Rocky Mountains, 110–180 kilometres (68–112 mi) west of Calgary, Banff encompasses 6,641 square kilometres (2,564 sq mi) of mountainous terrain, with many glaciers and ice fields, dense coniferous forest, and alpine landscapes. It is bordered by Jasper National Park to the north, Yoho National Park and Kootenay National Park to the west in British Columbia, and Kananaskis Country to the southeast. The main commercial centre of the park is the town of Banff, in the Bow River valley.

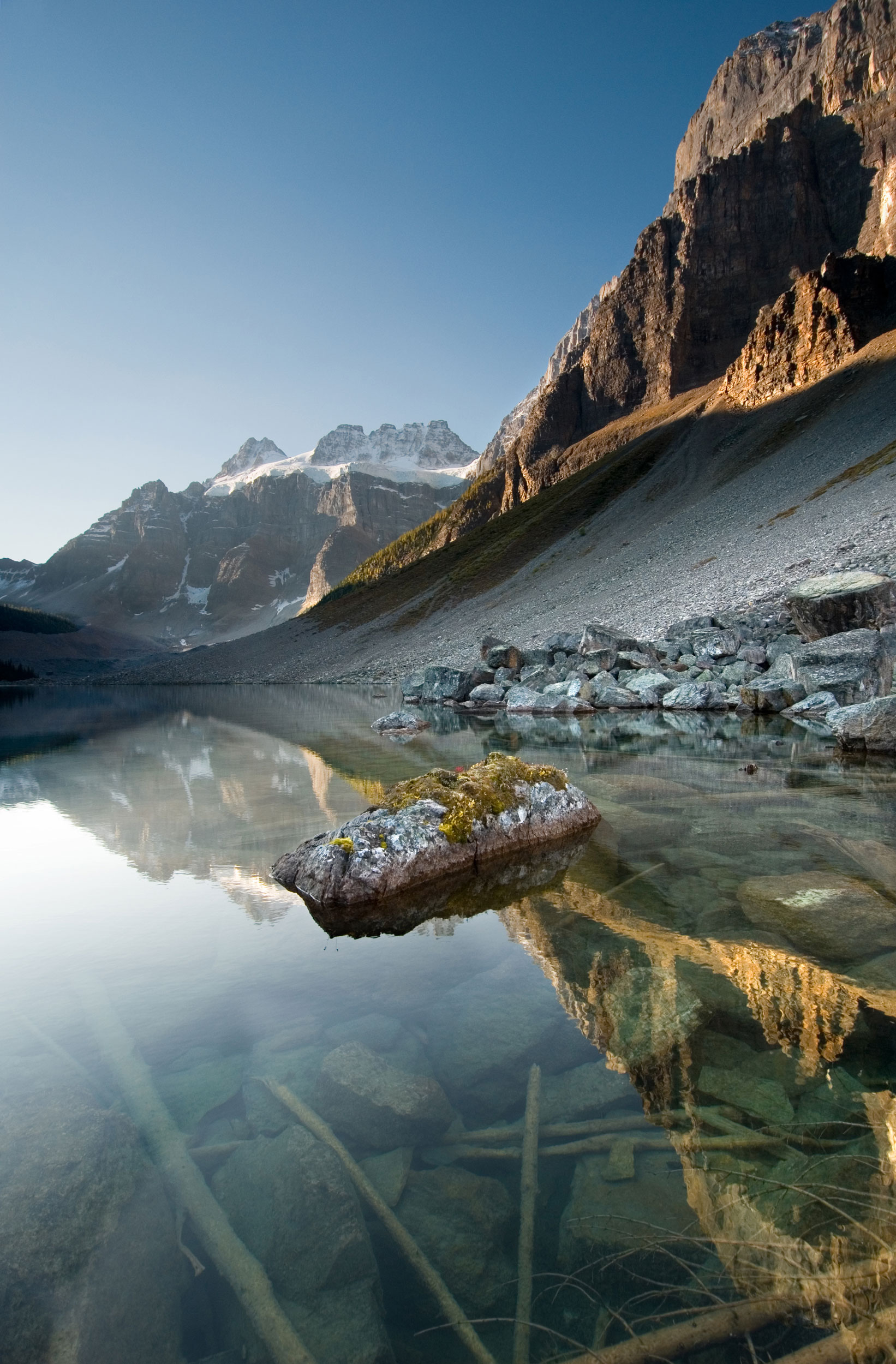
Lower Consolation Lake

The mountains were formed from sedimentary rocks that were pushed east over newer rock strata, between 80 million and 55 million years ago. Over the past few million years, glaciers have at times covered most of the park. Glaciers are now found only on the mountain slopes, including the Columbia Icefield, the largest uninterrupted glacial mass in the Rockies. Erosion from water and ice have carved the mountains into their current shapes. Banff National Park has a subarctic climate with three ecoregions, including montane, subalpine, and alpine. The forests are dominated by lodgepole pine at lower elevations and Engelmann spruce in higher ones below the treeline, above which is primarily rocks and ice. Mammal species such as the grizzly bear, cougar, wolverine, elk, bighorn sheep and moose are found, along with hundreds of bird species.

Before the park was established, the Stoney Nakoda and other indigenous people lived in the area, where they maintained subsistence uses including hunting. In 1875, the Canadian Pacific Railway began construction of a transcontinental railroad through the park. Canadian Pacific Railway was instrumental in Banff's early years, building the Banff Springs Hotel and Chateau Lake Louise, which attracted tourists. In the early 20th century, roads were built in Banff, at times by war internees from World War I, and through Great Depression-era public works projects. Since the 1960s, park accommodations have been open all year, with annual tourism visits to Banff increasing to over 4.5 million, as of 2025. With the increase in tourism, the health of the ecosystem in Banff has been threatened. In the mid-1990s, Parks Canada responded by initiating a two-year study which resulted in management recommendations and new policies that aim to preserve ecological integrity.

== History ==
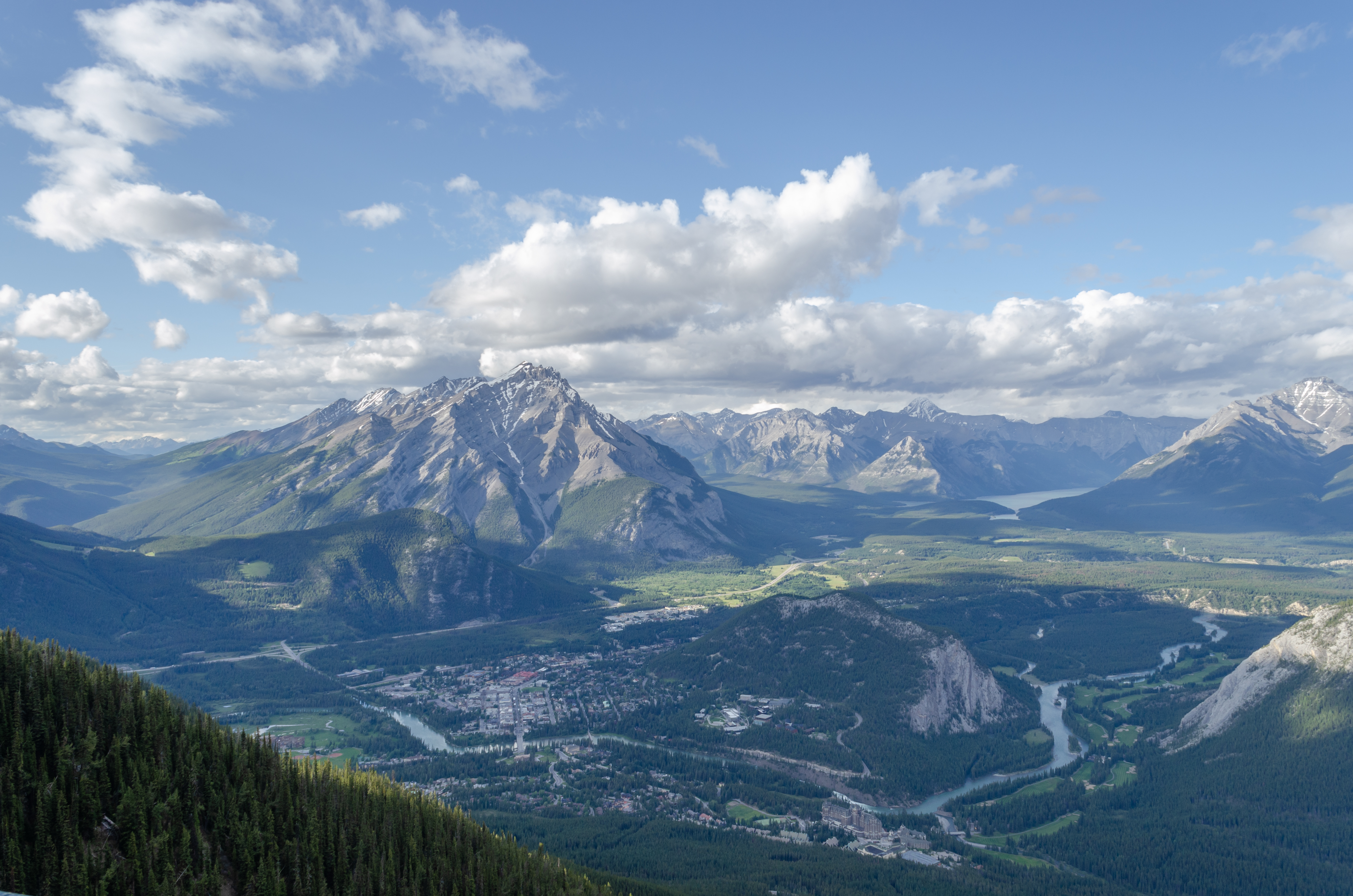
View from the summit of Sulphur Mountain, showing Banff and the surrounding areas

Archaeological evidence found at Vermilion Lakes indicates that there was human activity in Banff as early as 10,300 BP. Prior to European contact, the area that is now Banff National Park was home to many Indigenous Peoples, including the Stoney Nakoda, Ktunaxa, Tsuut'ina, Kainaiwa, Piikani, Siksika, and Plains Cree. Indigenous peoples utilized the area to hunt, fish, trade, travel, survey and practice culture. Many places within Banff National Park are still known by their Stoney Nakoda names including Lake Minnewanka and the Waputik Range.

In the nineteenth century, the Banff–Bow Valley was of particular significance to the Nakoda people, who moved seasonally through the region to hunt and for other subsistence uses of the land. The area was also important to the Nakoda for spiritual and cultural reasons, including the thermal hot springs at Cave and Basin.

As the fur trade expanded westward, David Thompson of the North West Company crossed Howse Pass in 1807. In 1841, the Hudson's Bay Company governor George Simpson traveled up the Bow Valley and crossed the Simpson Pass. Between 1857 and 1860, the Palliser expedition conducted scientific surveys in the region. In 1858, geologist James Hector explored the Bow Valley, and crossed both the Vermilion Pass and Kicking Horse Pass.

=== Rocky Mountains Park established ===
As a condition for British Columbia joining the Canadian Confederation in 1871, Canada agreed to build a transcontinental railroad to connect the province to eastern Canada. Construction of the railroad began in 1875, with Kicking Horse Pass chosen, over the more northerly Yellowhead Pass, as the route through the Canadian Rockies. Ten years later, on November 7, 1885, the last spike was driven in Craigellachie, British Columbia.

In 1883, during construction of the railroad, workers encountered the hot springs and this led to government interest and conflicting claims over the hot springs. In 1885, Prime Minister John A. Macdonald decided to set aside a small reserve of 26 square kilometres (10 sq mi) around the hot springs at Cave and Basin as a public park known as the Banff Hot Springs Reserve. Under the Rocky Mountains Park Act, enacted on June 23, 1887, the park was expanded to 674 km^{2} (260 sq mi) and named Rocky Mountains Park. This was Canada's first national park, and the third established in North America, after Yellowstone and Mackinac National Parks. The Canadian Pacific Railway built the Banff Springs Hotel and Lake Louise Chalet to attract tourists and increase the number of rail passengers.

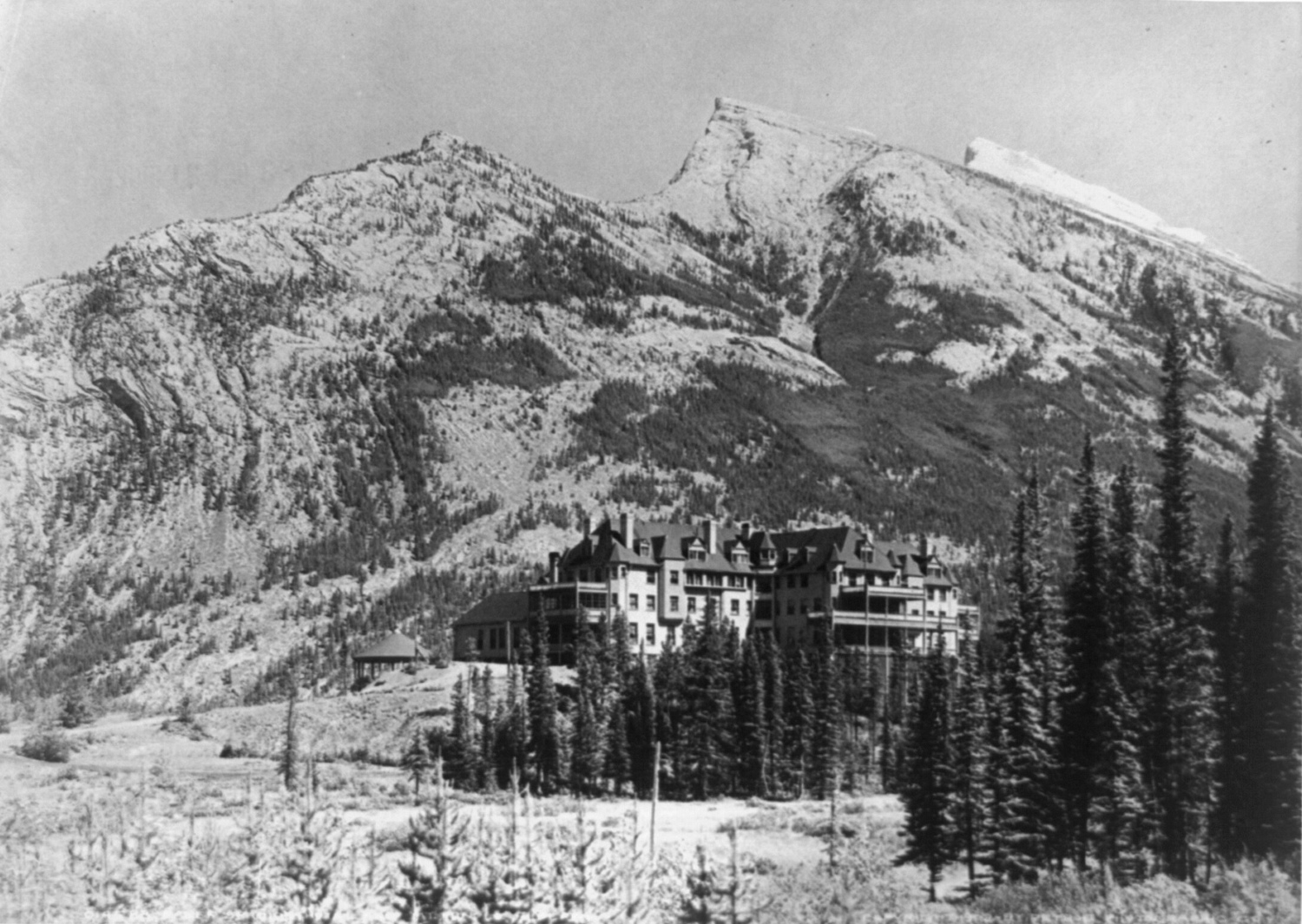
Banff Springs Hotel, 1902

The Stoney Nakoda First Nation were removed from Banff National Park between the years 1890 and 1920. The park was designed to appeal to sportsmen, and tourists. The exclusionary policy met the goals of sports hunting, tourism, and game conservation, as well as of those attempting to "civilize" the First Nations of the area.

Early on, Banff was popular with wealthy European and American tourists, the former of which arrived in Canada via trans-Atlantic luxury liner and continued westward on the railroad. Some visitors participated in mountaineering activities, often hiring local guides. Guides Jim and Bill Brewster founded one of the first outfitters in Banff. From 1906, the Alpine Club of Canada organized climbs, hikes and camps in the park.

By 1911, Banff was accessible by automobile from Calgary. Beginning in 1916, the Brewsters offered motorcoach tours of Banff. In 1920, access to Lake Louise by road was available, and the Banff-Windermere Road opened in 1923 to connect Banff with British Columbia.

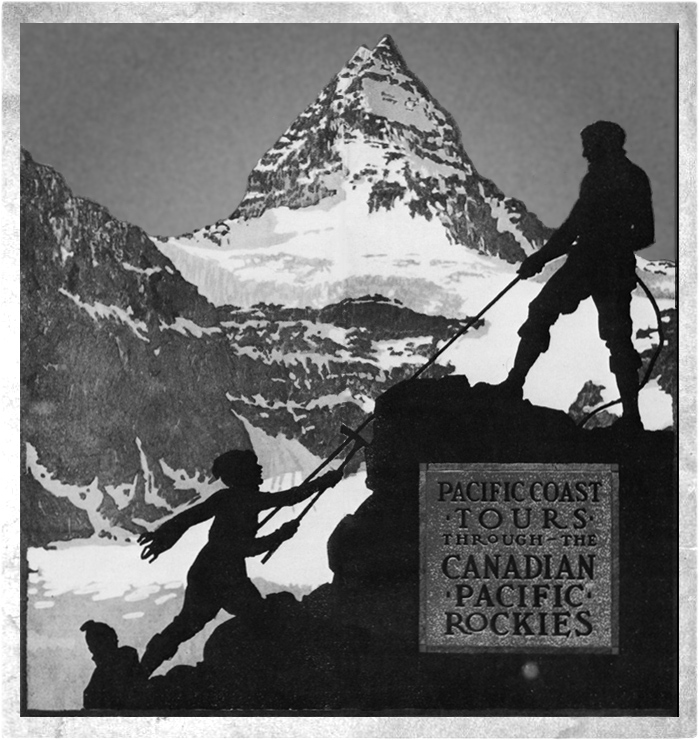
Canadian Pacific Railway advertising brochure, highlighting Mount Assiniboine and Banff scenery, c. 1917

In 1902, the park was expanded to cover 11,400 km^{2} (4,400 sq mi), encompassing areas around Lake Louise, and the Bow, Red Deer, Kananaskis, and Spray rivers. Bowing to pressure from grazing and logging interests, the size of the park was reduced in 1911 to 4,663 km^{2} (1,800 sq mi), eliminating many eastern foothills areas from the park. Park boundaries changed several more times up until 1930, when the area of Banff was fixed at 6,697 km^{2} (2,586 sq mi), with the passage of the National Parks Act. The act, which took effect May 30, 1930, also renamed the park Banff National Park, named for the Canadian Pacific Railway station, which in turn was named after the Banffshire region in Scotland. With the construction of a new east gate in 1933, Alberta transferred 0.84 km^{2} (0.32 sq mi) to the park. This, along with other minor changes in the park boundaries in 1949, set the area of the park at 6,641 km^{2} (2,564 sq mi).

=== Coal mining ===
In 1877, the First Nations of the area signed Treaty 7, which gave Canada rights to explore the land for resources. At the beginning of the 20th century, coal was mined near Lake Minnewanka in Banff. For a brief period, a mine operated at Anthracite but was shut down in 1904. The Bankhead mine, at Cascade Mountain, was operated by the Canadian Pacific Railway from 1903 to 1922. In 1926, the town was dismantled, with many buildings moved to the town of Banff and elsewhere.

=== Internment and work camps ===
During World War I, immigrants from Austria-Hungary and Germany were sent to Banff to work in internment camps. The main camp was at Castle Mountain, and was moved to Cave and Basin during winter. Much early infrastructure and road construction was done by men of various Slavic origins although Ukrainians constituted a majority of those held in Banff. Historical plaques and a statue erected by the Ukrainian Canadian Civil Liberties Association commemorate those interned at Castle Mountain, and at Cave and Basin National Historic Site where an interpretive pavilion dealing with Canada's first national internment operations opened in September 2013.

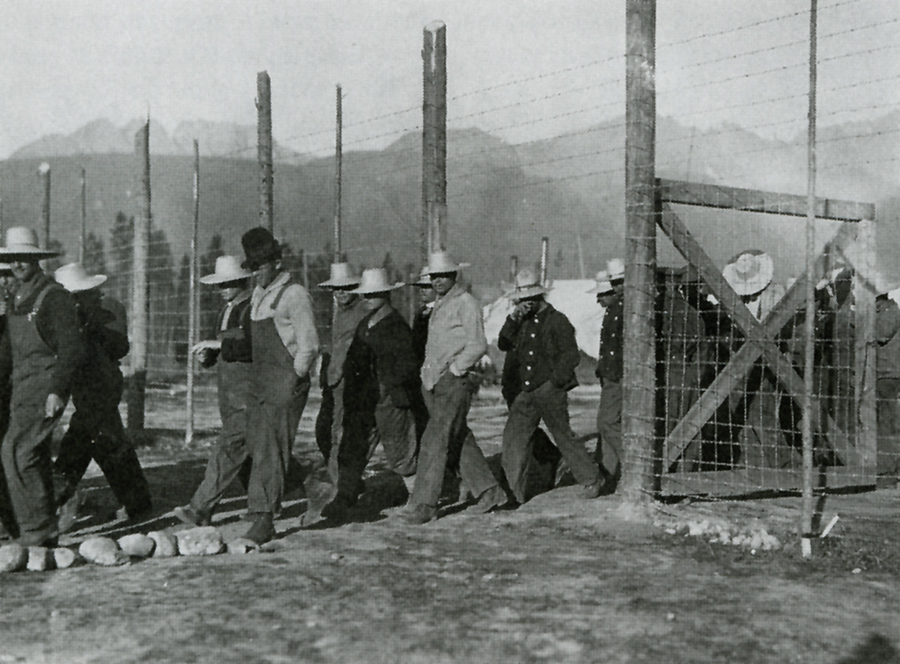
Castle Mountain internment camp, 1915

In 1931, the Government of Canada enacted the Unemployment and Farm Relief Act which provided public works projects in the national parks during the Great Depression. In Banff, workers constructed a new bathhouse and pool at Upper Hot Springs to supplement Cave and Basin. Other projects involved road building in the park, tasks around the Banff townsite and construction of a highway connecting Banff and Jasper. In 1934, the Public Works Construction Act was passed, providing continued funding for the public works projects. New projects included construction of a new registration facility at Banff's east gate and construction of an administrative building in Banff. By 1940, the Icefields Parkway reached the Columbia Icefield area of Banff and connected Banff and Jasper. Most of the infrastructure present in the national park dates from public work projects enacted during the Great Depression.

Alternative service camps for conscientious objectors were set up in Banff during World War II, with camps at Lake Louise, Stoney Creek, and Healy Creek. These camps were largely populated by Mennonites from Saskatchewan.

=== Winter tourism ===
Winter tourism in Banff began in February 1917, with the first Banff Winter Carnival. It was marketed to a regional middle class audience, and became the centerpiece of local boosters aiming to attract visitors, which were a low priority for the Canadian Pacific Railway (CPR). The carnival featured a large ice palace, which in 1917 was built by World War I internees. Carnival events included cross-country skiing, ski jumping, curling, snowshoe, and skijoring. In the 1930s, the first downhill ski resort, Sunshine Village, was developed by the Brewsters. Mount Norquay ski area was also developed during the 1930s, with the first chair lift installed there in 1948.

Since 1968, when the Banff Springs Hotel was winterized, Banff has been a year-round destination. In the 1950s, the Trans-Canada Highway was constructed, providing another transportation corridor through the Bow Valley, making the park more accessible.

Canada launched several bids to host the Winter Olympics in Banff, with the first bid for the 1964 Winter Olympics, which were eventually awarded to Innsbruck, Austria. Canada narrowly lost a second bid, for the 1968 Winter Olympics, which were awarded to Grenoble, France. Once again, Banff launched a bid to host the 1972 Winter Olympics, with plans to hold the Olympics at Lake Louise. The 1972 bid was controversial, as environmental lobby groups strongly opposed the bid, which had sponsorship from Imperial Oil. Bowing to pressure, Jean Chrétien, then the Minister of Environment, the government department responsible for Parks Canada, withdrew support for the bid, which was eventually lost to Sapporo, Japan. When nearby Calgary hosted the 1988 Winter Olympics, the cross-country ski events were held at the Canmore Nordic Centre Provincial Park at Canmore, Alberta, located just outside the eastern gates of Banff National Park on the Trans-Canada Highway.

=== Conservation ===
Since the original Rocky Mountains Park Act, subsequent acts and policies placed greater emphasis on conservation. With public sentiment tending towards environmentalism, Parks Canada issued major new policy in 1979, which emphasized conservation. The National Parks Act was amended in 1988, which made preserving ecological integrity the first priority in all park management decisions. The act also required each park to produce a management plan, with greater public participation.

In 1984, Banff was declared a UNESCO World Heritage Site, Canadian Rocky Mountain Parks World Heritage Site, together with the other national and provincial parks that form the Canadian Rocky Mountain Parks, for the mountain landscapes containing mountain peaks, glaciers, lakes, waterfalls, canyons and limestone caves as well as fossil beds. With this designation came added obligations for conservation.

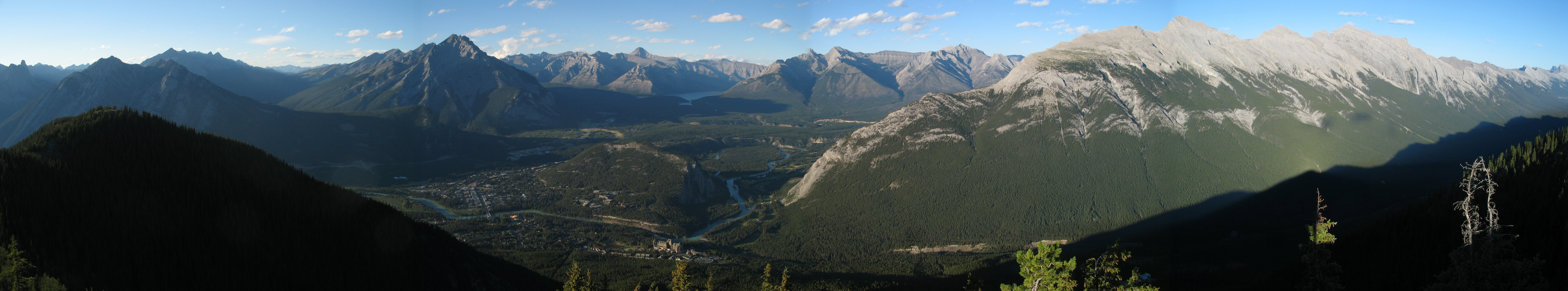
View from the summit of Sulphur Mountain, showing Banff and the surrounding areas

During the 1980s, Parks Canada moved to privatize many park services such as golf courses, and added user fees for use of other facilities and services to help deal with budget cuts. In 1990, the town of Banff was incorporated, giving local residents more say regarding any proposed developments.

In the 1990s, development plans for the park, including expansion at Sunshine Village, were under fire with lawsuits filed by Canadian Parks and Wilderness Society (CPAWS). In the mid-1990s, the Banff–Bow Valley Study was initiated to find ways to better address environmental concerns, and issues relating to development in the park.

== Geography ==
Points of interest in Banff National Park. Click the map for details.

Banff National Park is in the Rocky Mountains on Alberta's western border with British Columbia in the Alberta Mountain forests ecoregion. By road, the town of Banff is 128 kilometres (80 mi) west of Calgary and 401 km (249 mi) southwest of Edmonton. Jasper National Park borders Banff National Park to the north, while Yoho National Park is to the west and Kootenay National Park is to the south. Kananaskis Country, which includes Bow Valley Wildland Provincial Park, Spray Valley Provincial Park, and Peter Lougheed Provincial Park, is located to the south and east of Banff.

The Trans-Canada Highway passes through Banff National Park, from the eastern boundary near Canmore, through the towns of Banff and Lake Louise, and into Yoho National Park in British Columbia. The Banff townsite is the main commercial centre in the national park. The village of Lake Louise is at the junction of the Trans-Canada Highway and the Icefields Parkway, which extends north to the Jasper townsite. The Banff–Windermere Highway extends to the south from Castle Junction, connecting Banff National Park with Kootenay National Park and Radium Hot Springs.

=== Banff ===
Banff, established in 1885, is the main commercial centre in Banff National Park, as well as a centre for cultural activities. Banff is home to several cultural institutions, including the Banff Centre, the Whyte Museum, the Buffalo Nations Luxton Museum, Cave and Basin National Historic Site, and several art galleries. Throughout its history, Banff has hosted many annual events, including Banff Indian Days which began in 1889, and the Banff Winter Carnival. Since 1976, The Banff Centre has organized the Banff Mountain Film Festival. In 1990, Banff incorporated as a town of Alberta, though still subject to the National Parks Act and federal authority in regards to planning and development. In its 2017 census, the town of Banff had a permanent population of 8,865 as well as 793 non-permanent residents for a total population of 9,658. The Bow River flows through the town of Banff, with the Bow Falls on the outskirts of town.

=== Lake Louise ===
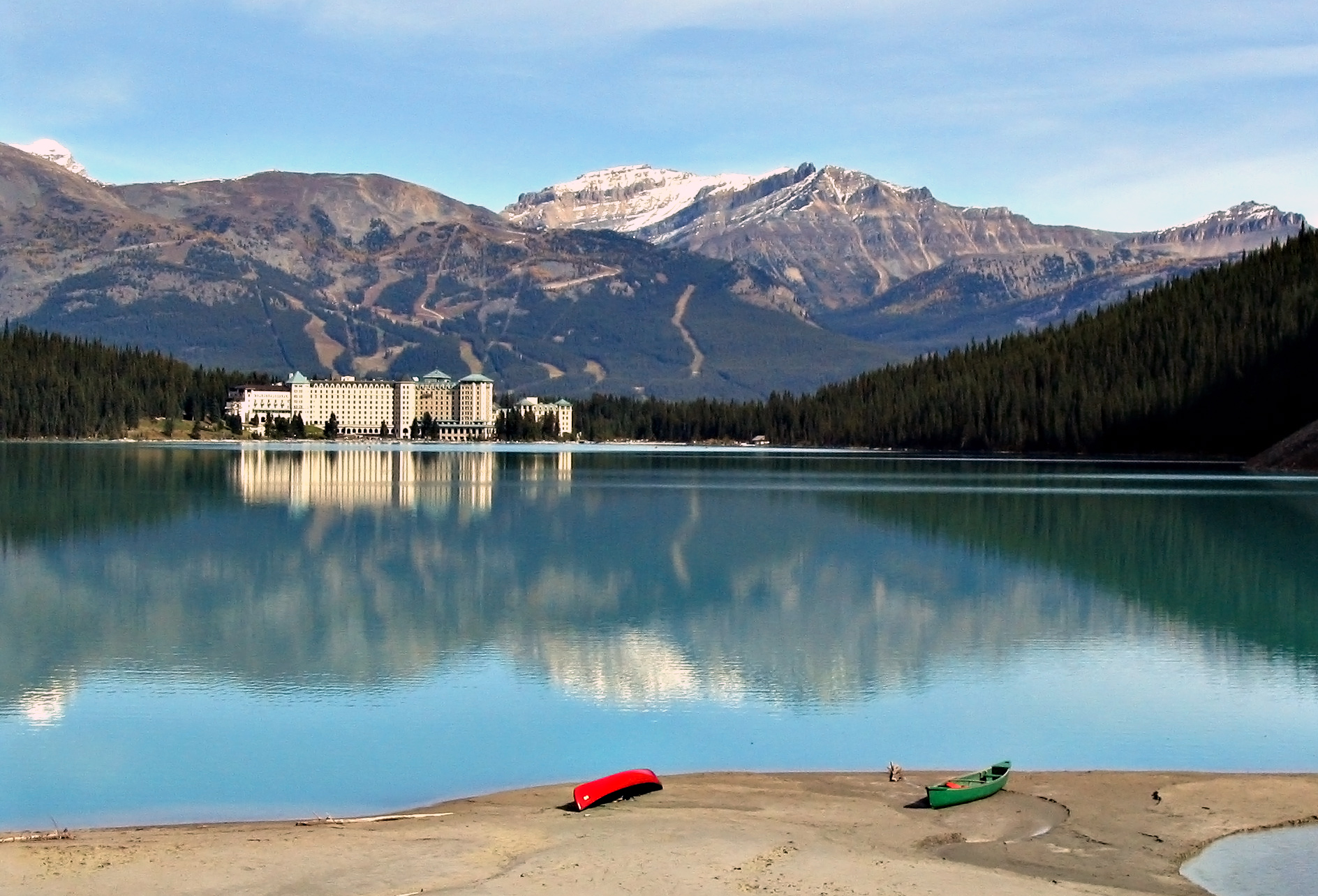
Lake Louise

Lake Louise, a hamlet 54 km (34 mi) northwest of the town of Banff, is home to the landmark Chateau Lake Louise at the edge of Lake Louise. Located 15 km (9.3 mi) from Lake Louise, Moraine Lake provides a scenic vista of the Valley of the Ten Peaks. This scene is on the back of the Canadian $20 bill in the 1969–1979 ("Scenes of Canada") series. The Lake Louise Mountain Resort is also near the village. Lake Louise is one of the most visited lakes in the world and is framed to the southwest by the Mount Victoria Glacier.

=== Icefields Parkway ===
The Icefields Parkway is a 230-kilometre-long (140 mi) road connecting Lake Louise to Jasper, Alberta. The Parkway originates at Lake Louise, and extends north up the Bow Valley, past Hector Lake, which is the largest natural lake in the park. Other scenic lakes near the parkway include Bow Lake, and Peyto Lakes, both north of Hector Lake. The Parkway then crosses Bow Summit (2,088 m (6,850 ft)), and follows the Mistaya River to Saskatchewan Crossing, where it converges with the Howse and North Saskatchewan River. Bow Summit is the highest elevation crossed by a public road in Canada.

The North Saskatchewan River flows east from Saskatchewan Crossing, out of Banff, into what is known as David Thompson Country, and onto Edmonton. The David Thompson Highway follows the North Saskatchewan River, past the man-made Abraham Lake, and through David Thompson Country.

North of Saskatchewan Crossing, the Icefields Parkway follows the North Saskatchewan River up to the Columbia Icefield. The Parkway crosses into Jasper National Park at Sunwapta Pass at 2,035 metres (6,677 ft) in elevation, and continues on from there to the Jasper townsite.

== Geology ==
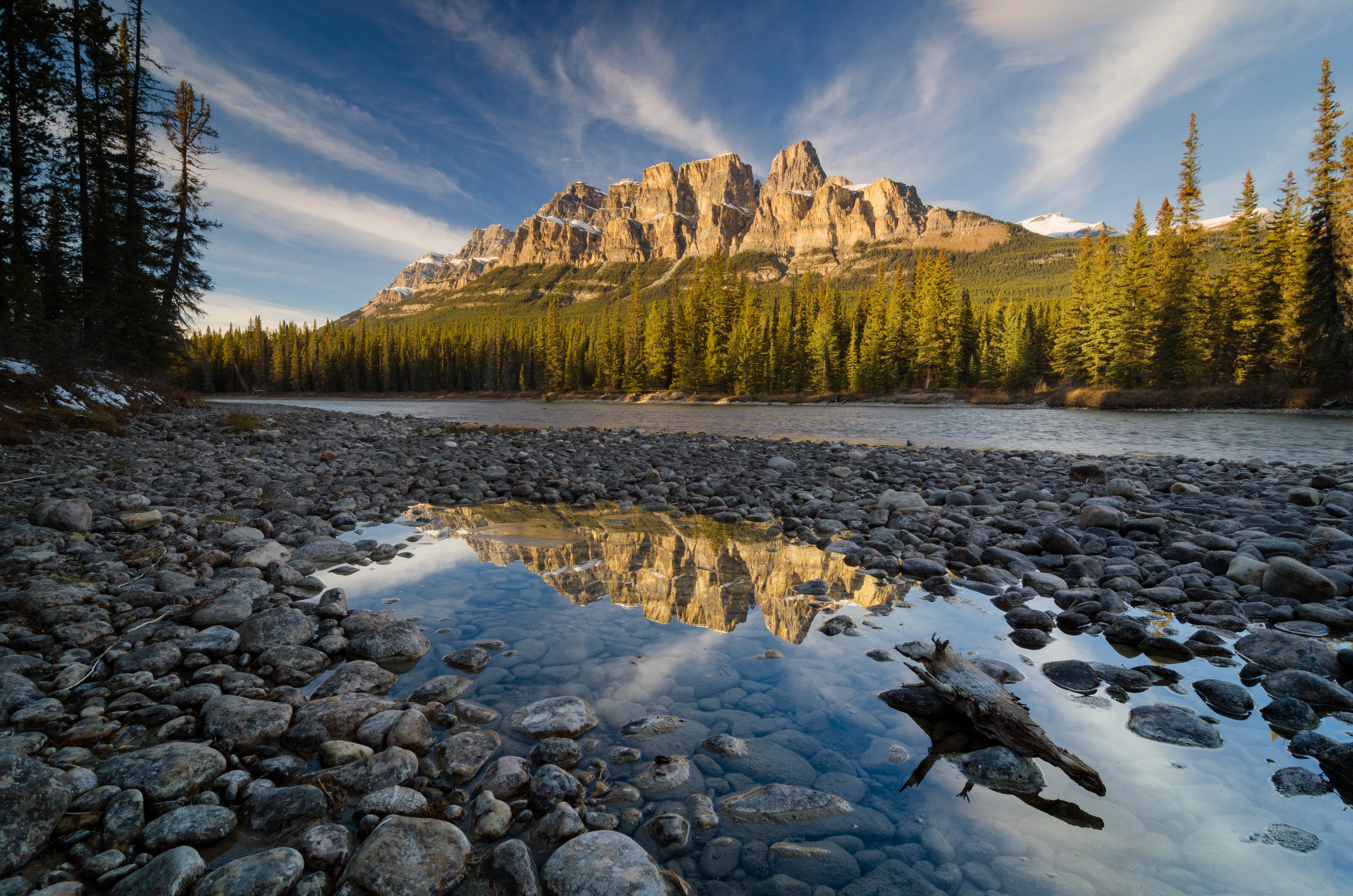
Castle Mountain

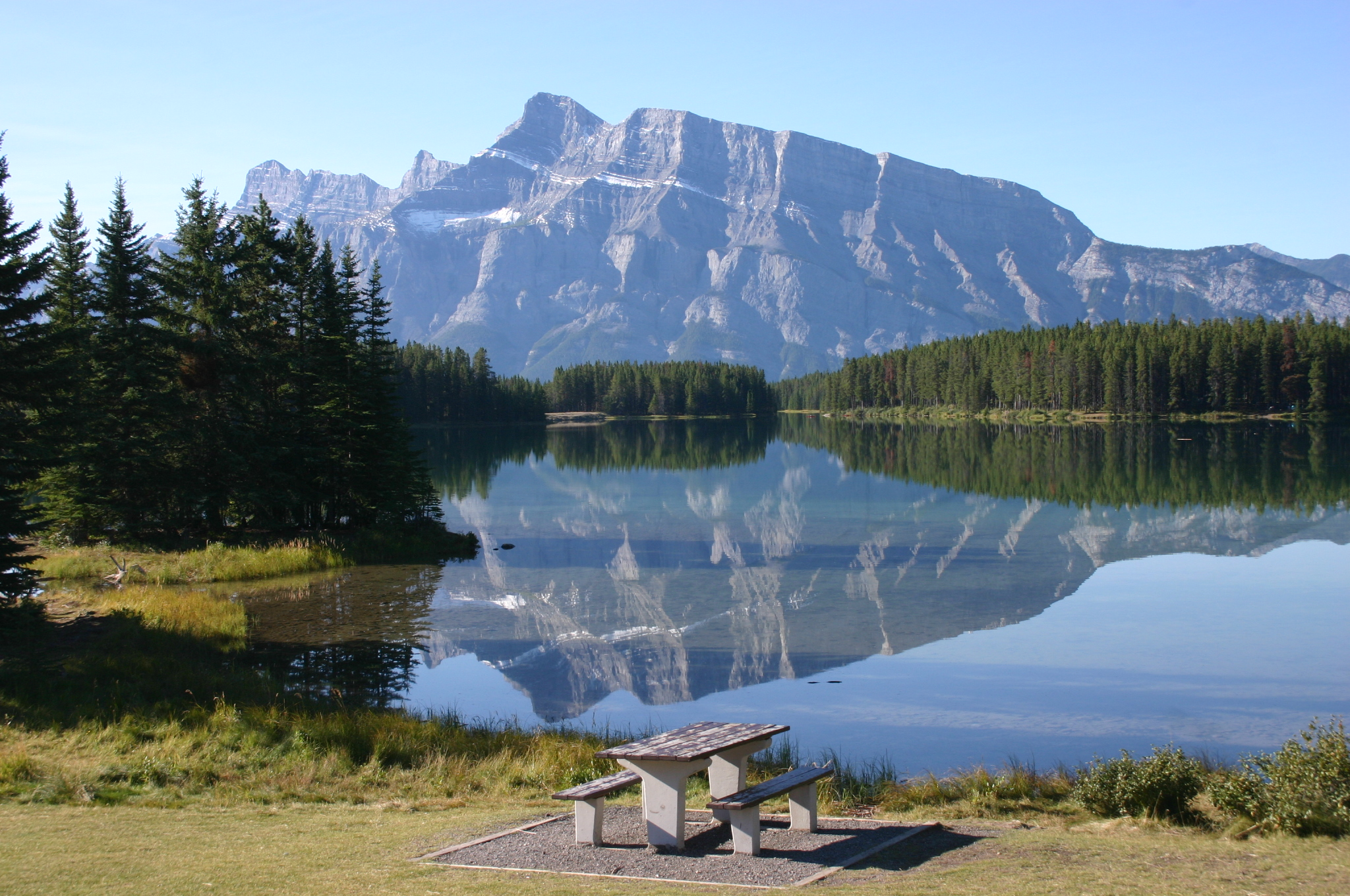
Two Jack Lake and Mount Rundle

The Canadian Rockies consist of several northwest–southeast trending ranges. Two main mountain ranges are within the park, each consisting of numerous subranges. The western border of the park follows the crest of the Main Ranges (also known as the Park Ranges), which is also the continental divide. The Main Ranges in Banff National Park include from north to south, the Waputik, Bow and Blue Ranges. The high peaks west of Lake Louise are part of the Bow Range. The eastern border of the park includes all of the Front Ranges consisting of from north to south, the Palliser, Sawback and Sundance Ranges. The Banff townsite is in the Front Ranges. Just outside the park to the east lie the foothills that extend from Canmore at the eastern entrance of the park eastward into the Great Plains. Well west of the park, the Western Ranges of the Rockies pass through Yoho and Kootenay National Parks. Though the tallest peak entirely within the park is Mount Forbes at 3,612 metres (11,850 ft), Mount Assiniboine on the Banff-Mount Assiniboine Provincial Park border is slightly higher at 3,618 m (11,870 ft).

The Canadian Rockies are composed of sedimentary rock, including shale, sandstone, dolomite and limestone. The vast majority of geologic formations in Banff range in age from Precambrian to the Jurassic periods (600–145 m.y.a.). However, rocks as young as the lower Cretaceous (145–66 m.y.a.) can be found near the east entrance and on Cascade Mountain above the Banff townsite. These sedimentary rocks formed at the bottom of shallow seas between 600 and 175 m.y.a. and were pushed east during the Laramide orogeny. Mountain building in Banff National Park ended approximately 55 m.y.a.

The Canadian Rockies may have risen up to 8,000 metres (26,000 ft) approximately 70 m.y.a. Once mountain formation ceased, erosion carved the mountains into their present rugged shape. The erosion was first due to water, then was greatly accelerated by the Quaternary glaciation 2.5 million years ago. Glacial landforms dominate Banff's geomorphology, with examples of all classic glacial forms, including cirques, arêtes, hanging valleys, moraines, and U-shaped valleys. The pre-existing structure left over from mountain-building strongly guided glacial erosion: mountains in Banff include complex, irregular, anticlinal, synclinal, castellate, dogtooth, and sawback mountains.

Many of the mountain ranges trend northwest to southeast, with sedimentary layering dipping down to the west at 40–60 degrees. This leads to dip slope landforms, with generally steeper east and north faces, and trellis drainage, where rivers and old glacial valleys followed the weaker layers in the rocks as they were relatively easily weathered and eroded. Classic examples are found at the Banff townsite proper: Mount Rundle is a classic dip slope mountain. Just to the north of the Banff townsite, Castle Mountain is composed of numerous Cambrian age rock formations. The uppermost section of the peak consists of relatively harder dolomite from the Eldon Formation. Below that lies the less dense shales of the Stephen Formation and the lowest exposed cliffs are limestones of the Cathedral Formation. Dogtooth mountains, such as Mount Louis, exhibit sharp, jagged slopes. The Sawback Range, which consists of nearly vertical dipping sedimentary layers, has been eroded by cross gullies. The erosion of these almost vertical layers of rock strata in the Sawback Range has resulted in formations that appear like the teeth on a saw blade. Erosion and deposition of higher elevation rock layers has resulted in scree deposits at the lowest elevations of many of the mountains.

=== Glaciers and icefields ===
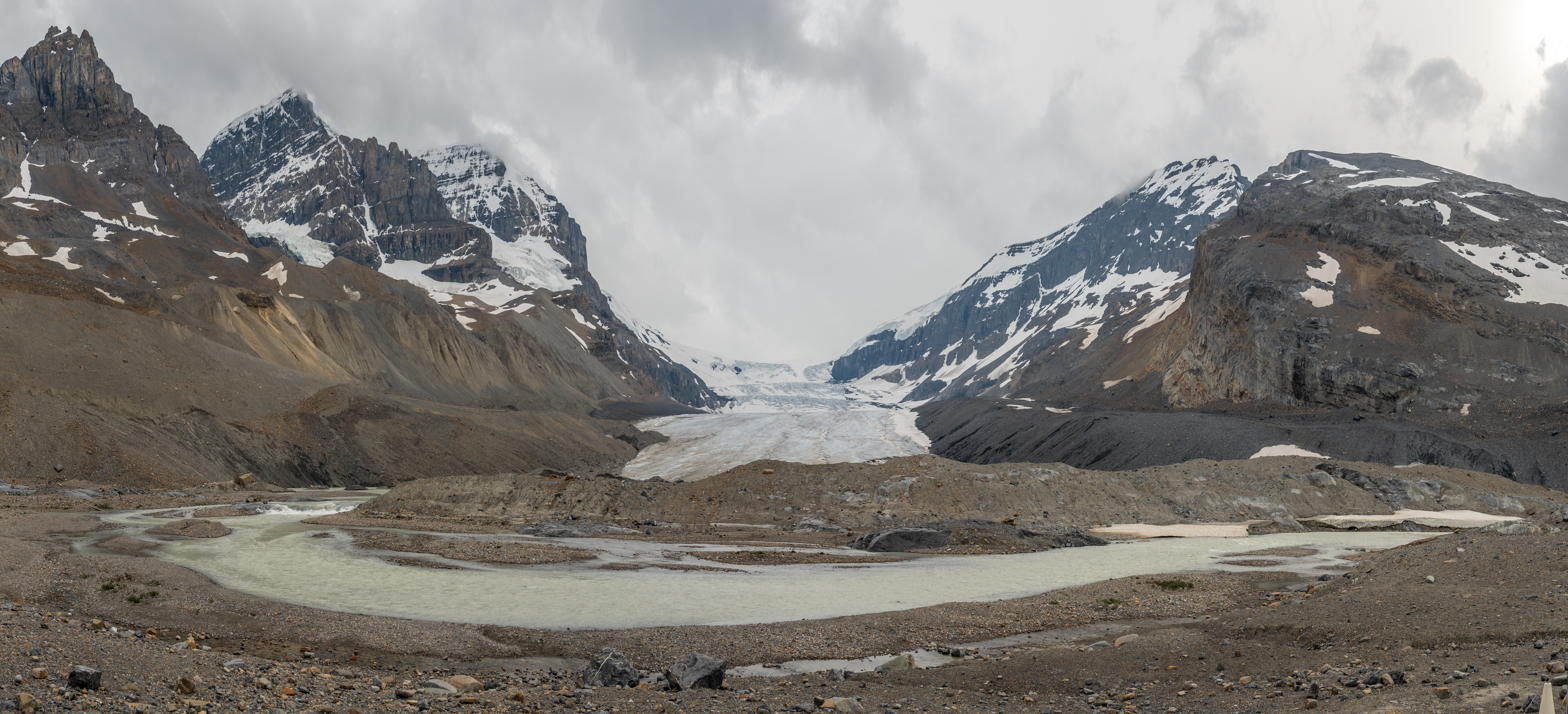
The Columbia Icefield's Athabasca Glacier at the southern end of Jasper, near the border with Banff

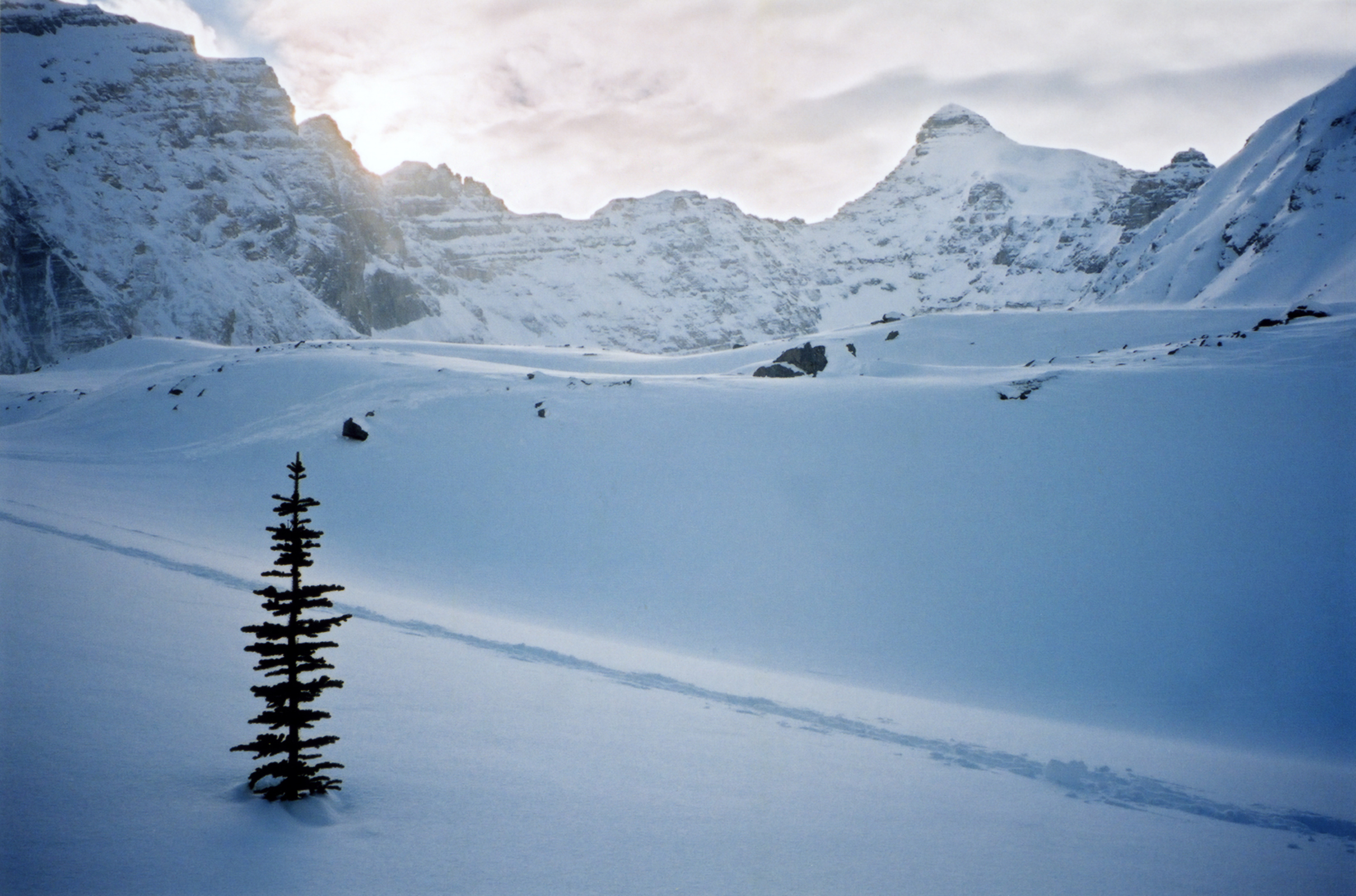
Parker Ridge, near the Columbia Icefield

Banff National Park has numerous large glaciers and icefields, 100 of which can be observed from the Icefields Parkway. Small cirque glaciers are fairly common in the Main Ranges, in depressions on the side of many mountains. As with the majority of mountain glaciers around the world, the glaciers in Banff are retreating. While Peyto Glacier is one of the longest continuously studied glaciers in the world, with research extending back to the 1970s, most of the glaciers of the Canadian Rockies have only been scientifically evaluated since the late 1990s. Glaciologists are now researching the glaciers in the park more thoroughly, and have been analyzing the impact that reduced glacier ice may have on water supplies to streams and rivers. Estimates are that 150 glaciers disappeared in the Canadian Rockies (areas both inside and outside Banff National Park) between 1920 and 1985. Another 150 glaciers disappeared between 1985 and 2005, indicating that the retreat and disappearance of glaciers is accelerating. In Banff National Park alone, in 1985 there were 365 glaciers but by 2005, 29 glaciers had disappeared. The total glaciated area dropped from 625 to 500 square kilometres (241 to 193 sq mi) in that time period.

The largest glaciated areas include the Waputik and Wapta Icefields, which both lie on the Banff-Yoho National Park border. Outlets of the Wapta Icefield on the Banff side of the continental divide include Peyto, Bow, and Vulture Glaciers. Bow Glacier retreated an estimated 1,100 m (3,600 ft) between the years 1850 and 1953, and since that period, there has been further retreat which has left a newly formed lake at the terminal moraine. Peyto Glacier has lost 70 percent of its volume since record keeping began and retreated approximately 1 kilometre (0.62 mi) between 1999 and 2021. Peyto Glacier is at risk of losing 80-90% of its current mass by 2100.

The Columbia Icefield, at the northern end of Banff, straddles the Banff and Jasper National Park border and extends into British Columbia. Snow Dome, in the Columbia Icefield is a hydrological apex of North America, with water flowing via outlet glaciers to the Atlantic, Pacific and Arctic Oceans. Saskatchewan Glacier, which is approximately 13 km (8 mi) in length and 30 km^{2} (12 sq mi) in area, is the major outlet of the Columbia Icefield that flows into Banff National Park. Between the years 1893 and 1953, Saskatchewan Glacier had retreated a distance of 1,364 m (4,475 ft), with the rate of retreat between 1948 and 1953 averaging 55 m (180 ft) per year. Overall, the glaciers of the Canadian Rockies lost 25 percent of their mass during the 20th century.

== Climate ==
Under the Köppen climate classification, the park has a subarctic climate (Dfc) with cold, snowy winters, and mild summers. The climate is influenced by altitude with lower temperatures generally found at higher elevations. Located on the eastern side of the Continental Divide, Banff National Park receives 454.0 mm (17.87 in) of precipitation annually. This is considerably less than in Yoho National Park on the western side of the divide in British Columbia, where 884.2 mm (34.81 in) (1971-1990 normals) is received at Wapta Lake and approximately 1,282 mm (50.5 in) at Boulder Creek annually. Being influenced by altitude, snowfall is also greater at higher elevations. As such, 183.8 cm (72.4 in) (1991–2020 normals) of snow falls on average each year in the Banff townsite, while 279.1 cm (109.9 in) (1981-2010 normals) falls in Lake Louise, which is at a higher altitude, 1,524 m (5,000 ft).

During winter months, temperatures in Banff are moderated, compared to other areas of central and northern Alberta, due to Chinook winds and other influences from British Columbia. The mean low temperature during January is −13.5 °C (7.7 °F), and the mean high temperature is −3.5 °C (25.7 °F) for the town of Banff. However, temperatures can drop below −20 °C (−4 °F) with wind chill values dropping below −30 for 3.5 days in an average year. Weather conditions during summer months are warm, with high temperatures during July averaging 22.5 °C (72.5 °F), and daily low temperatures averaging 6.8 °C (44.2 °F), leading to a large diurnal range owing to the relative dryness of the air.

Climate data for Banff Climate ID: 3050520; coordinates 51°11′N 115°34′W; elevation: 1,383.7 m (4,540 ft); 1991–2020 normals, extremes 1887−present
Month	Jan	Feb	Mar	Apr	May	Jun	Jul	Aug	Sep	Oct	Nov	Dec	Year
Record high humidex	12.2	13.9	19.2	24.4	29.0	31.6	33.4	34.0	30.4	24.2	15.9	12.2	34.0
Record high °C (°F)	12.3 (54.1)	14.7 (58.5)	20.0 (68.0)	25.6 (78.1)	29.4 (84.9)	37.8 (100.0)	35.6 (96.1)	34.2 (93.6)	31.0 (87.8)	26.5 (79.7)	16.5 (61.7)	12.5 (54.5)	37.8 (100.0)
Mean daily maximum °C (°F)	−3.5 (25.7)	−0.5 (31.1)	3.7 (38.7)	9.0 (48.2)	14.3 (57.7)	17.9 (64.2)	22.5 (72.5)	22.1 (71.8)	16.7 (62.1)	9.1 (48.4)	0.6 (33.1)	−4.6 (23.7)	8.9 (48.0)
Daily mean °C (°F)	−8.5 (16.7)	−6.6 (20.1)	−2.2 (28.0)	2.8 (37.0)	7.4 (45.3)	11.2 (52.2)	14.7 (58.5)	14.0 (57.2)	9.4 (48.9)	3.4 (38.1)	−3.8 (25.2)	−9.0 (15.8)	2.7 (36.9)
Mean daily minimum °C (°F)	−13.5 (7.7)	−12.6 (9.3)	−8.2 (17.2)	−3.5 (25.7)	0.5 (32.9)	4.4 (39.9)	6.8 (44.2)	5.8 (42.4)	2.2 (36.0)	−2.4 (27.7)	−8.2 (17.2)	−13.4 (7.9)	−3.5 (25.7)
Record low °C (°F)	−51.2 (−60.2)	−45.0 (−49.0)	−40.6 (−41.1)	−27.2 (−17.0)	−17.8 (0.0)	−4.1 (24.6)	−3.2 (26.2)	−4.5 (23.9)	−16.7 (1.9)	−27.0 (−16.6)	−40.6 (−41.1)	−48.3 (−54.9)	−51.2 (−60.2)
Record low wind chill	−52.1	−49.1	−41.8	−37.0	−21.1	−5.7	−3.6	−4.3	−14.4	−30.5	−43.1	−50.6	−52.1
Average precipitation mm (inches)	18.8 (0.74)	18.6 (0.73)	29.3 (1.15)	39.2 (1.54)	50.0 (1.97)	73.3 (2.89)	46.9 (1.85)	46.9 (1.85)	44.9 (1.77)	35.8 (1.41)	27.8 (1.09)	22.5 (0.89)	454.0 (17.87)
Average rainfall mm (inches)	1.6 (0.06)	0.9 (0.04)	6.6 (0.26)	15.0 (0.59)	37.9 (1.49)	72.5 (2.85)	46.7 (1.84)	49.0 (1.93)	39.9 (1.57)	18.7 (0.74)	5.5 (0.22)	1.3 (0.05)	295.7 (11.64)
Average snowfall cm (inches)	21.2 (8.3)	20.3 (8.0)	25.3 (10.0)	30.0 (11.8)	12.3 (4.8)	1.7 (0.7)	0.1 (0.0)	0.2 (0.1)	7.9 (3.1)	16.7 (6.6)	25.2 (9.9)	23.0 (9.1)	183.8 (72.4)
Average precipitation days (≥ 0.2 mm)	10.2	10.0	13.1	13.3	14.0	16.6	13.6	13.2	11.7	11.2	11.1	10.8	148.9
Average rainy days (≥ 0.2 mm)	0.59	0.60	2.6	4.7	12.3	16.5	12.8	12.8	10.2	6.9	2.0	1.1	83.0
Average snowy days (≥ 0.2 cm)	9.3	8.3	9.4	8.4	3.1	0.29	0.06	0.18	1.4	4.9	9.3	8.8	63.4
Average relative humidity (%) (at 1500 LST)	63.1	50.2	45.4	41.4	42.4	44.8	36.5	37.1	43.8	48.0	61.4	66.0	48.4
Mean monthly sunshine hours	58.9	93.2	127.1	159.0	201.5	207.0	254.2	213.9	171.0	130.2	81.0	43.4	1,740.4
Mean daily sunshine hours	1.9	3.3	4.1	5.3	6.5	6.9	8.2	6.9	5.7	4.2	2.7	1.4	4.8
Source: Environment and Climate Change Canada; June maximum; July maximum; sun, 1948–1970

== Ecology ==
=== Ecoregions ===
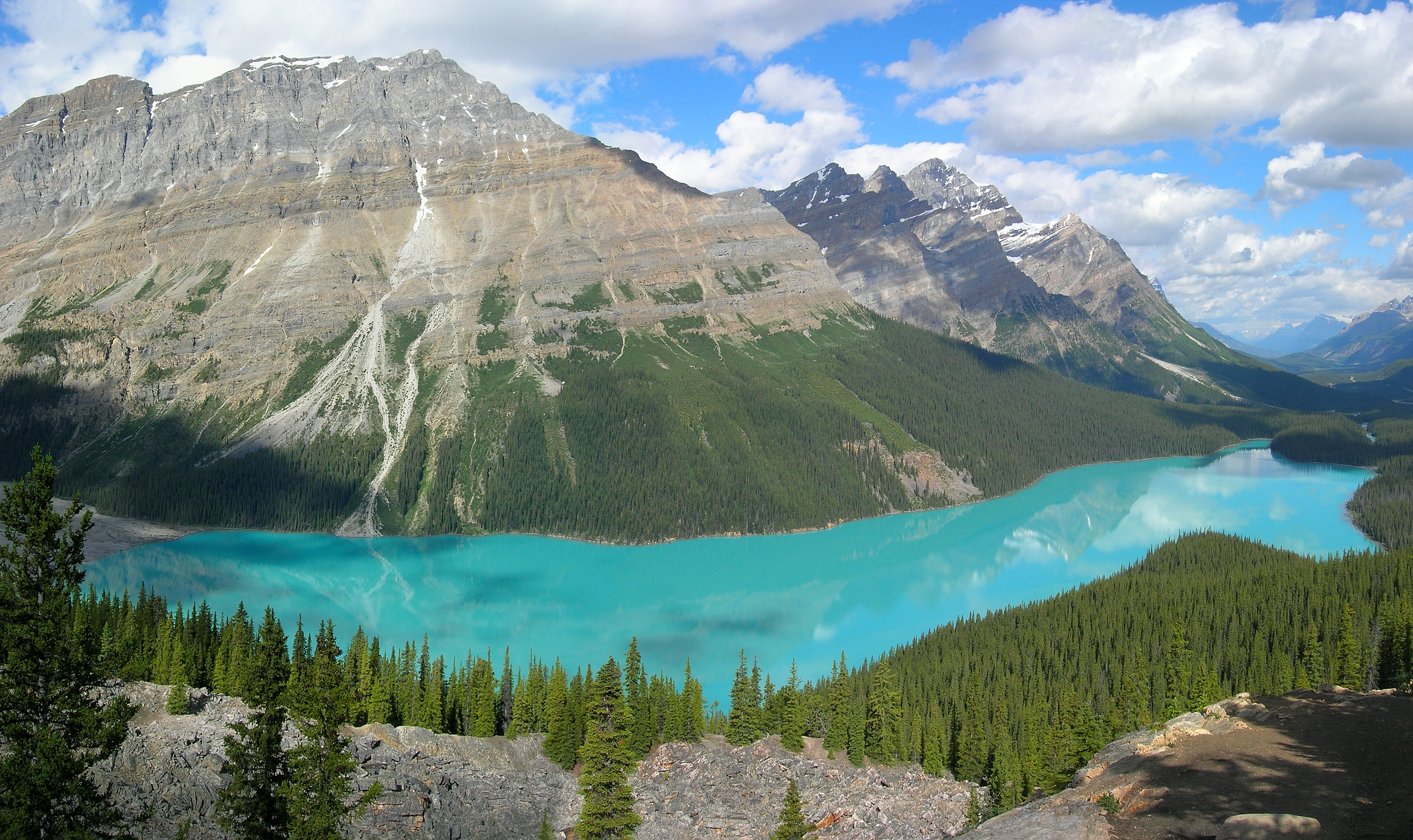
Peyto Lake

Banff National Park spans three ecoregions, including montane, subalpine, and alpine. The subalpine ecoregion, which consists mainly of dense forest, comprises 53 percent of Banff's area. 27 percent of the park is located above the tree line, in the alpine ecoregion. The tree line in Banff lies approximately at 2,300 m (7,500 ft), with open meadows at alpine regions and some areas covered by glaciers. A small portion (3 percent) of the park, at lower elevations, is in the montane ecoregion. Lodgepole pine forests dominate the montane region of Banff, with Engelmann spruce, willow, aspen, occasional Douglas-fir and a few Douglas maple interspersed. Engelmann spruce are more common in the subalpine regions of Banff, with some areas of lodgepole pine, and subalpine fir. The montane areas in the Bow Valley, which tend to be the preferred habitat for wildlife, have been subjected to significant human development over the years.

=== Wildlife ===
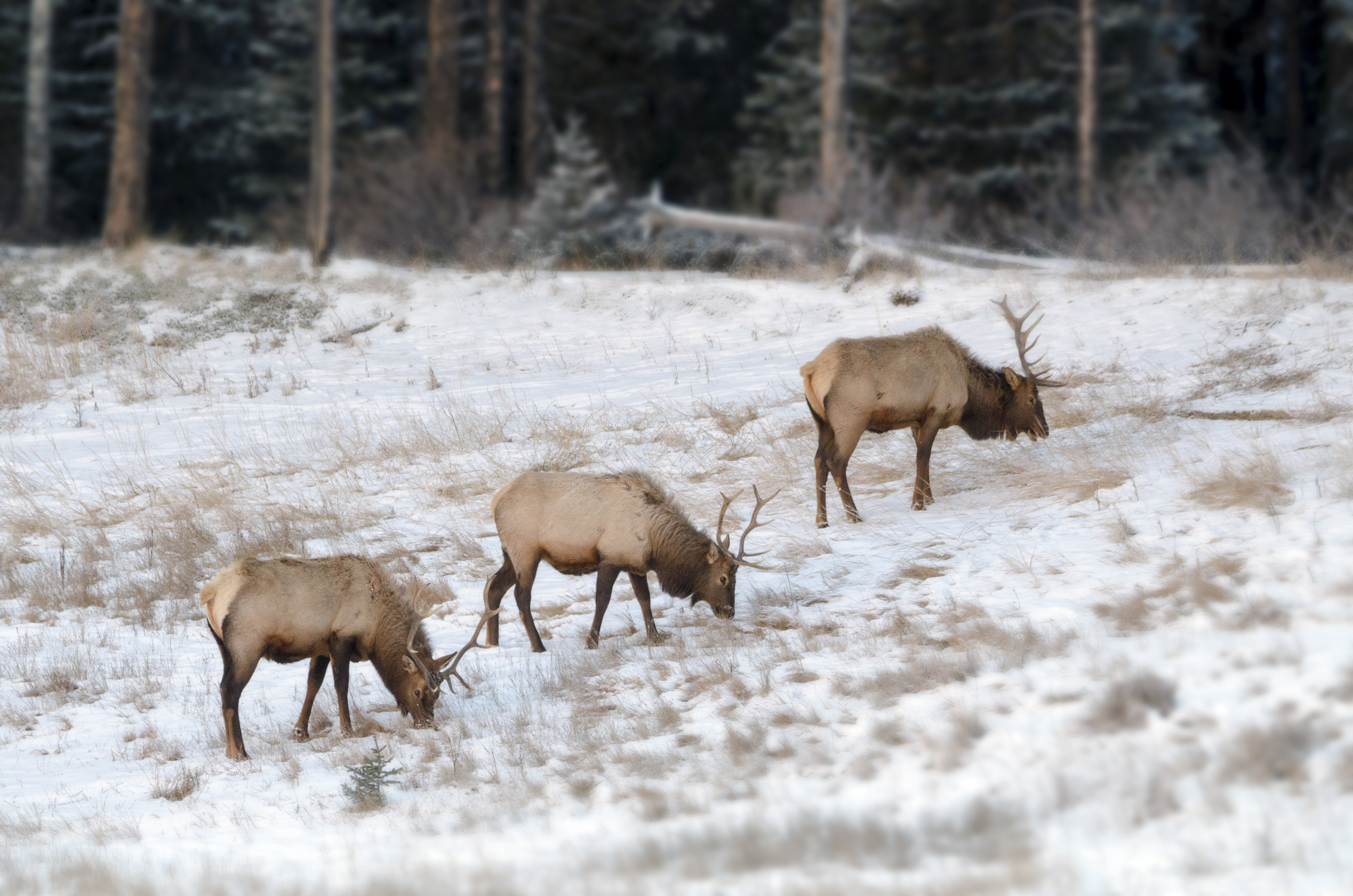
Elk bulls on a winter morning near Two Jack Lake

The park has 56 recorded mammal species. Grizzly bears and black bears inhabit the forested regions. Cougar, lynx, wolverine, red fox, weasel, river otter, coyote, and grey wolf are the primary predatory mammals. Elk, mule deer, and white-tailed deer are common in the valleys of the park, including around (and sometimes in) the Banff townsite, while moose tend to be more elusive, sticking primarily to wetland areas and near streams. In the alpine regions, mountain goat, bighorn sheep, marmot and pika are widespread. Other mammals such as beaver, porcupine, squirrel, chipmunk, snowshoe hare, and Columbian ground squirrel are the more commonly observed smaller mammals. Caribou were the rarest large mammals in the park, but an avalanche in 2009 may have killed the last five remaining within park boundaries. The American bison was extirpated in Banff, but was brought back to the park in 2017, and one free-roaming herd lives within the protected area.

Due to the harsh winters, the park has few reptile and amphibian species with only one species of toad, three species of frog, one salamander species and two species of snakes that have been identified. At least 280 species of birds can be found in Banff including bald and golden eagles, red-tailed hawk, osprey, and merlin, all of which are predatory species. Additionally, commonly seen species such as the Canada jay, American three-toed woodpecker, mountain bluebird, Clark's nutcracker, mountain chickadee and pipit are frequently found in the lower elevations. The white-tailed ptarmigan is a ground bird that is often seen in the alpine zones. Rivers and lakes are frequented by over a hundred different species including loon, heron and mallard which spend their summers in the park.

Endangered species in Banff include the Banff Springs snail (Physella johnsoni) that is found in the hot springs of Banff, and the woodland caribou.

=== Mountain pine beetles ===
Mountain pine beetles have caused a number of large-scale infestations in Banff National Park, feeding on the phloem of mature lodgepole pines. Alberta's first known outbreak occurred in 1940, infecting 43 km^{2} (17 sq mi) of forest in Banff. A second major outbreak occurred in the late 1970s and early 1980s in Banff and the surrounding Rocky Mountains region.

== Tourism ==
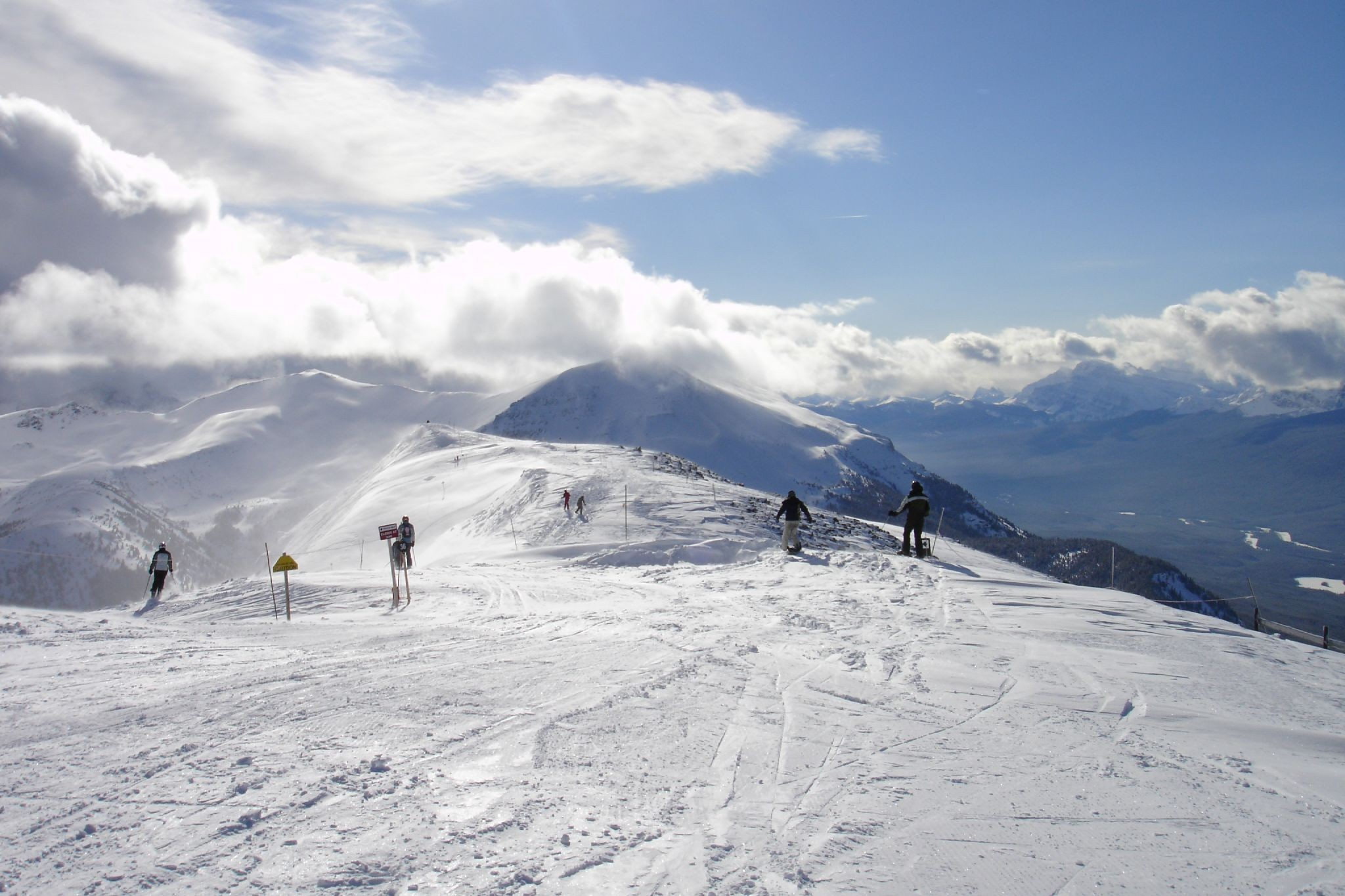
Skiing at Lake Louise

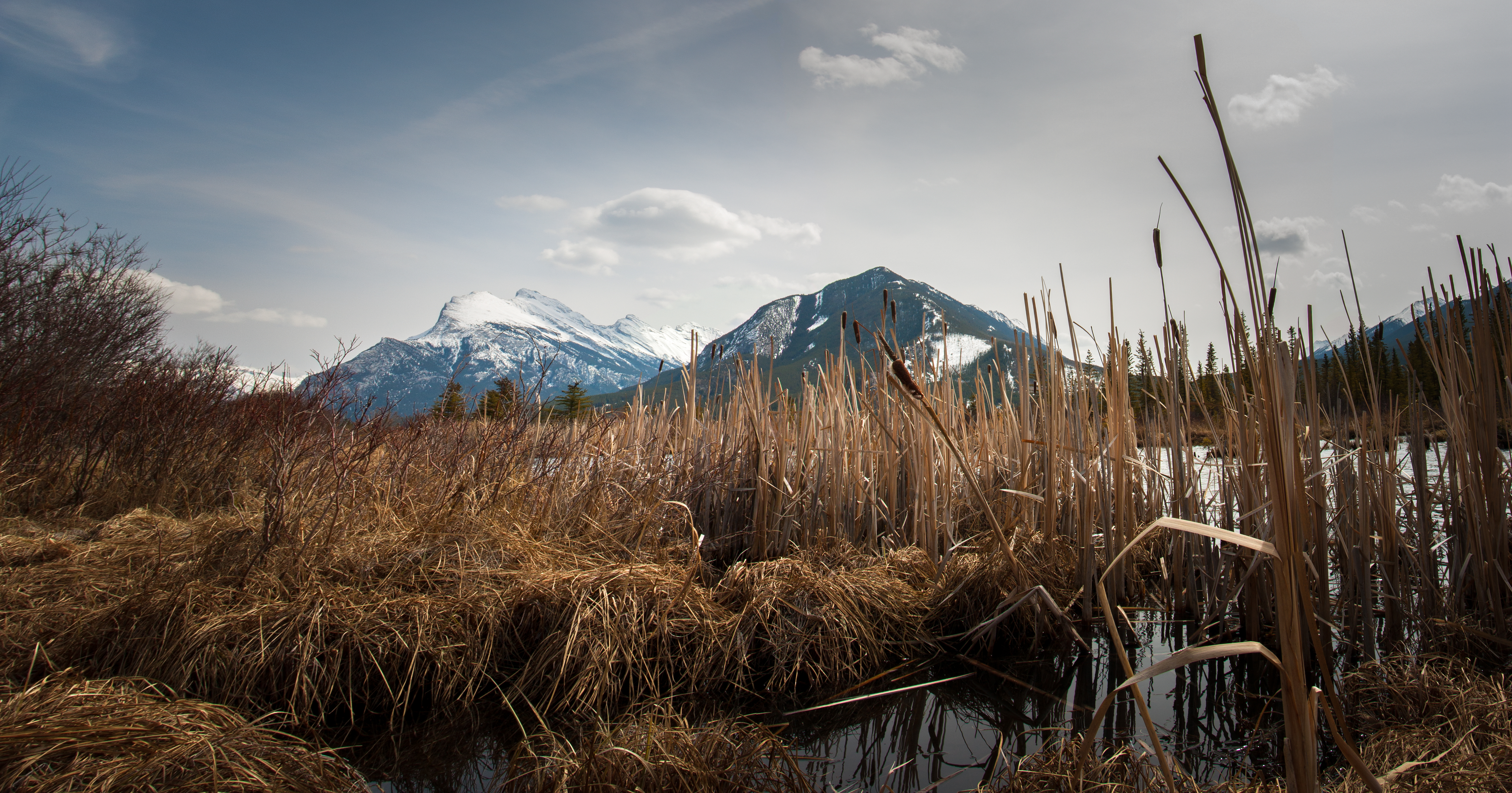
Mount Rundle and Sulphur Mountain as seen from the reeds along the shore of one of the Vermilion Lakes.

Banff National Park is the most visited national park in Canada, with more than four million annual visits in 2025. During the summer, popular activities include sightseeing, hiking, and camping, and skiing and snowboarding are popular in the winter.

The number of annual visits increased by 30% from 2012 to 2022, with visitation highest in the summer months and during the ski season. Parks Canada’s 2018 State of the Park Assessment identified increased visitation as a key challenge for the park, with many park facilities and popular sites reaching capacity, including Lake Louise, Moraine Lake, and Johnston Canyon.

A park pass is required for stopping in the park, and permit checks are common during the summer months, especially at Lake Louise and the start of the Icefields Parkway. A permit is not required if travelling straight through the park without stopping. Approximately 5 million people pass through Banff annually on the Trans-Canada Highway without stopping.

== Transportation ==
Banff Airport
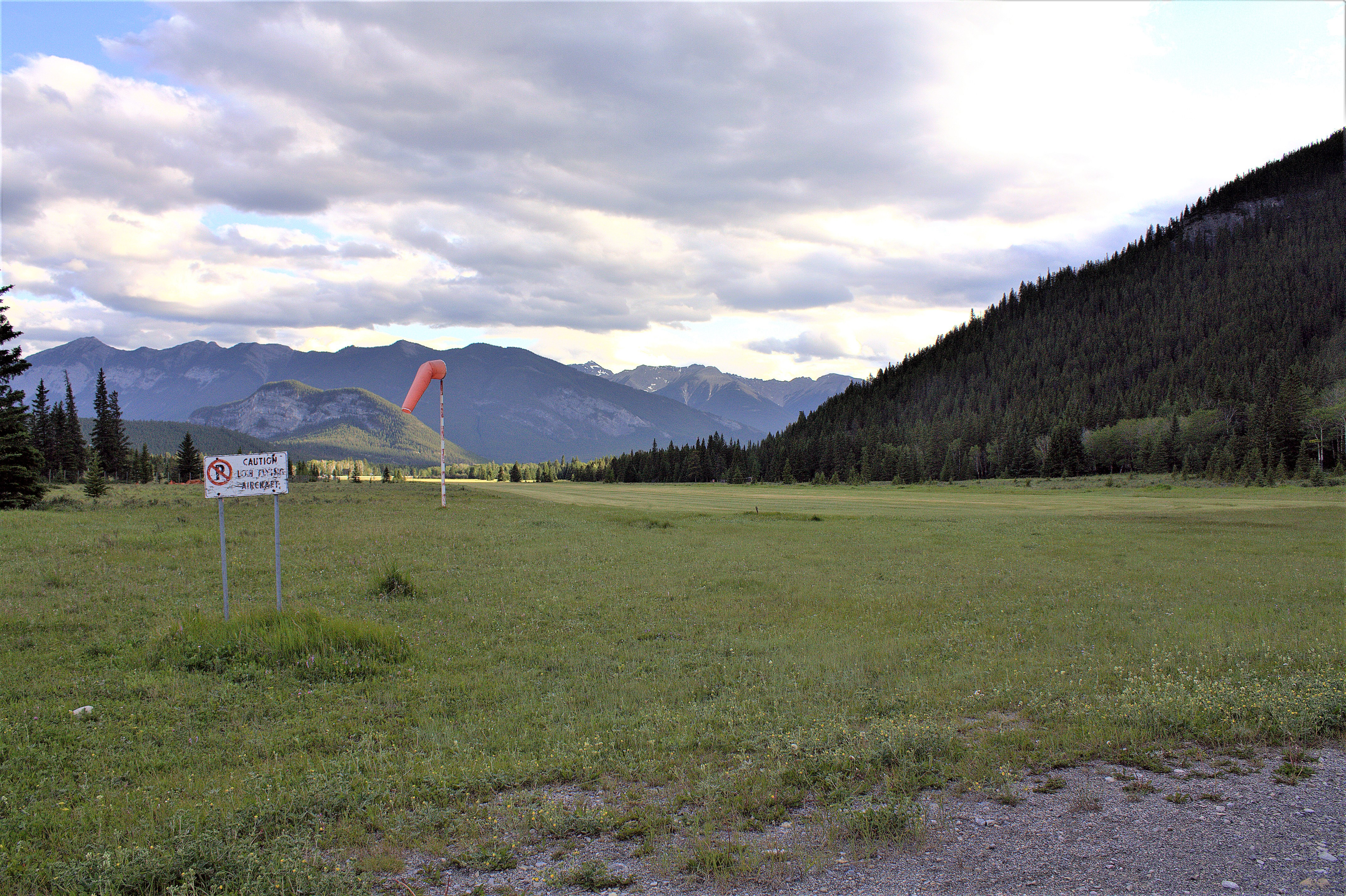
- IATA: YBA; ICAO: CYBA

Summary
- Airport type: Private
- Operator: Parks Canada
- Location: Banff National Park, near Banff, Alberta
- Time zone: Alberta Time (UTC−06:00)
- Elevation AMSL: 4,583 ft (1,397 m)
- Coordinates: 51°12′N 115°32′W

Map
- Location within Alberta

Runways
Direction	Length		Surface
Direction	ft	m	Surface
18/36	3,000	914	Turf/snow
- Sources: Canada Flight Supplement

Banff National Park is bisected by two highways that cross the Alberta/British Columbia border while another provides a third access within Alberta. The Trans-Canada Highway (Highway 1) bisects the park in an east–west direction, connecting it to Vancouver to the west and Calgary to the east. Highway 93 bisects the park in a north–south direction, connecting it to Cranbrook to the south and Jasper to the north. The portion of Highway 93 north of Lake Louise is known as the Icefields Parkway whereas the portion southwest of Castle Junction is known as the Banff-Windermere Parkway. Highway 11 (the David Thompson Highway) connects the Icefields Parkway at Saskatchewan River Crossing to Rocky Mountain House to the northeast. Within the park, Highway 1A, also known as the Bow Valley Parkway, loosely parallels Highway 1 between Banff and Lake Louise.

The closest airport with long-haul flights is Calgary International Airport (YYC). There is a registered aerodrome (Banff Aerodrome, (IATA: YBA, ICAO: CYBA)) operated by Parks Canada located in the park. The aerodrome requires prior permission for use.

Other transportation facilities within Banff National Park include a Canadian Pacific rail line that generally parallels Highway 1, and Banff Park Compound Heliport.

The Roam public transit system provides bus service around Banff townsite, Canmore, to Lake Louise, Johnston Canyon, and some other popular sites.

Since 2023, Moraine Lake Road has been closed to private vehicles, year-round. Parks Canada operates a shuttle bus service during summer months, providing access to Moraine Lake as well as to Lake Louise where parking is extremely limited. In the winter, Moraine Lake Road is used as a cross country ski trail.

== Management ==
=== Governance ===
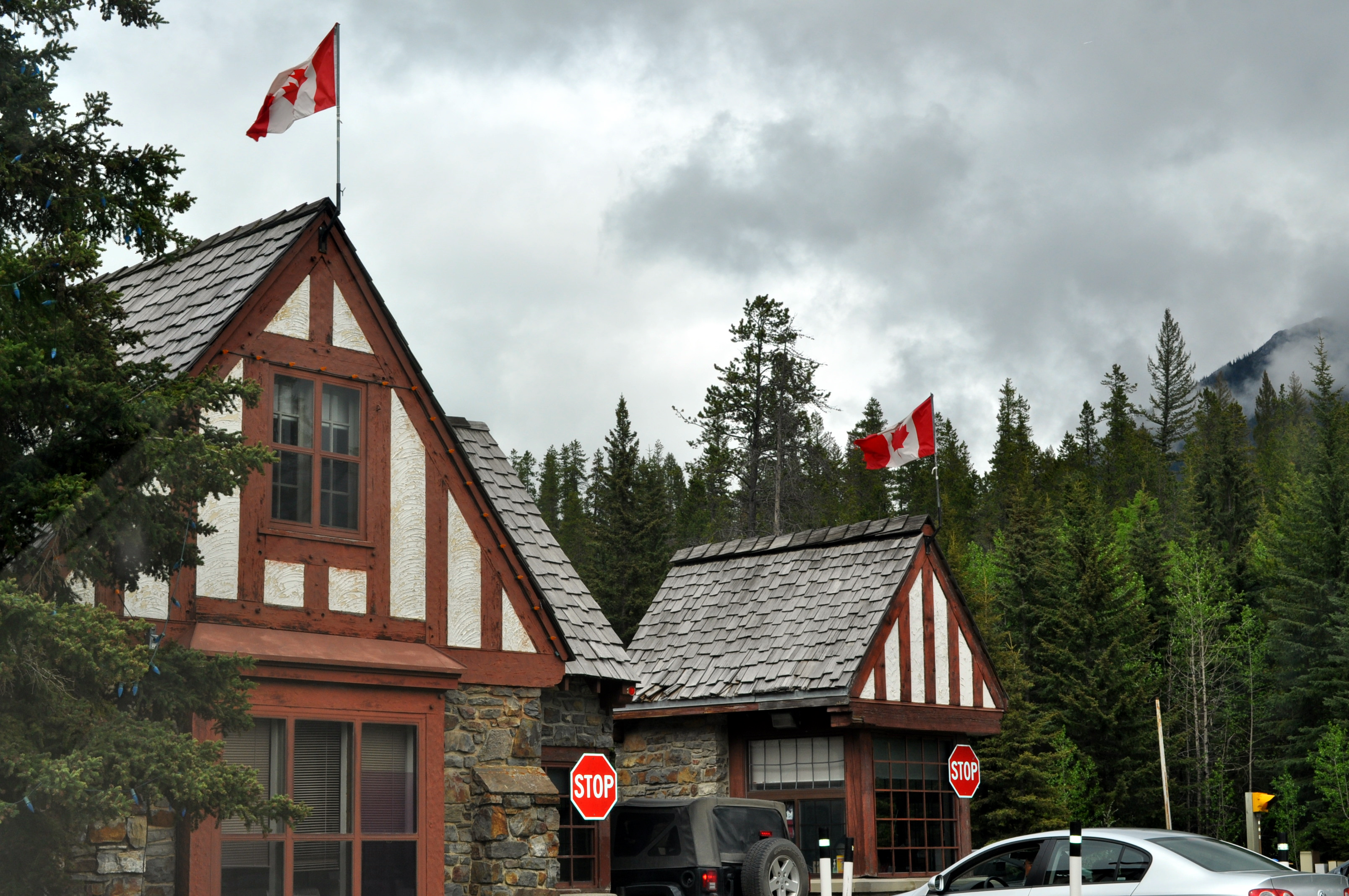
Entry station for Banff National Park

Banff National Park is managed by Parks Canada, under the Canada National Parks Act, which was enacted in 2000, and superseded the 1930 National Parks Act. The Canada National Parks Act made ecological integrity in the parks a top priority. It also requires each park to have a park management plan, which must be reviewed at least every 10 years.

The most recent park management plan was created in 2022. It focuses on protecting natural and cultural resources in Banff National Park, while also managing the large increase in visitation in recent years. Parks Canada also aims to improve relationships with Indigenous people.

In 2018, the Indigenous Advisory Circle, with representatives from the Bearspaw, Chiniki and Wesley (Stoney Nakoda), Siksika, Kainai, Piikani and Tsuut'ina First Nations and the Métis Nation of Alberta, was formed to advise Parks Canada on park management issues and the park management plan.

On a provincial level, the park area and the included communities (other than the town of Banff which is an incorporated municipality) are administered by Alberta Municipal Affairs as Improvement District No. 9 (Banff).

=== Wildlife management ===
Up until the 1960s and 1970s, the park was considered as a recreational area for visitors offering multiple leisure activities, including hunting. As ecological awareness increased, management procedures expanded with the inclusion of public participation in many management decisions. Simultaneously, the increase in human construction (such as new highways) on the natural landscape increased the frequency of human–animal conflicts. In 1988, wildlife began to be considered an integral part of the ecosystem.

The park now has a number of wildlife management strategies that aim to conserve certain species. Parks Canada uses an ecosystem based management approach that aims to preserve the ecology of the park while still providing for visitors. Management decisions are based on modern scientific ecological information as well as traditional knowledge.

==== Large species management ====
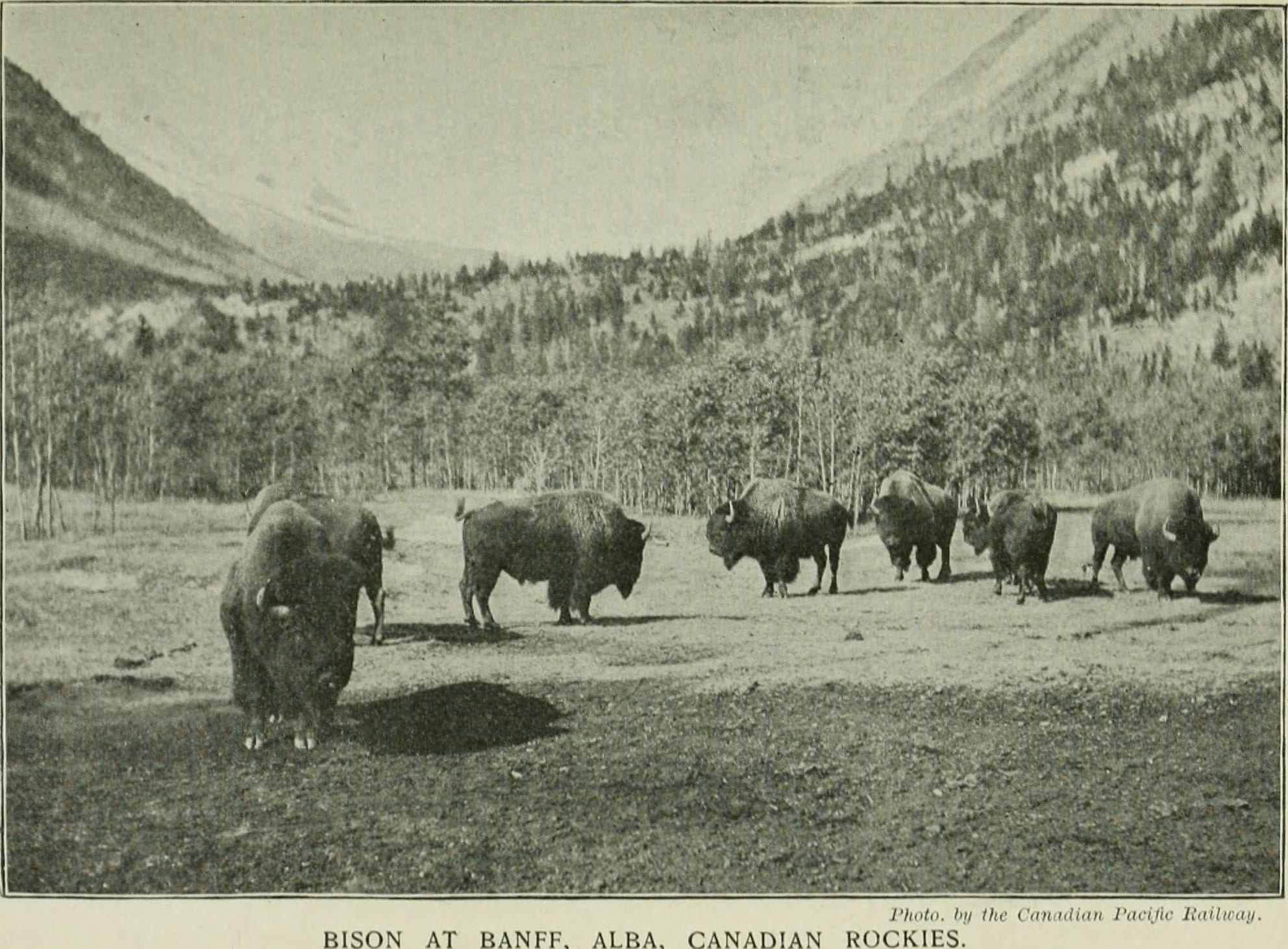
Bison in Banff in the 1900s

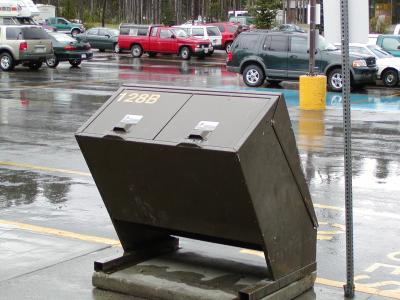
Bear-proof garbage can at Lake Louise

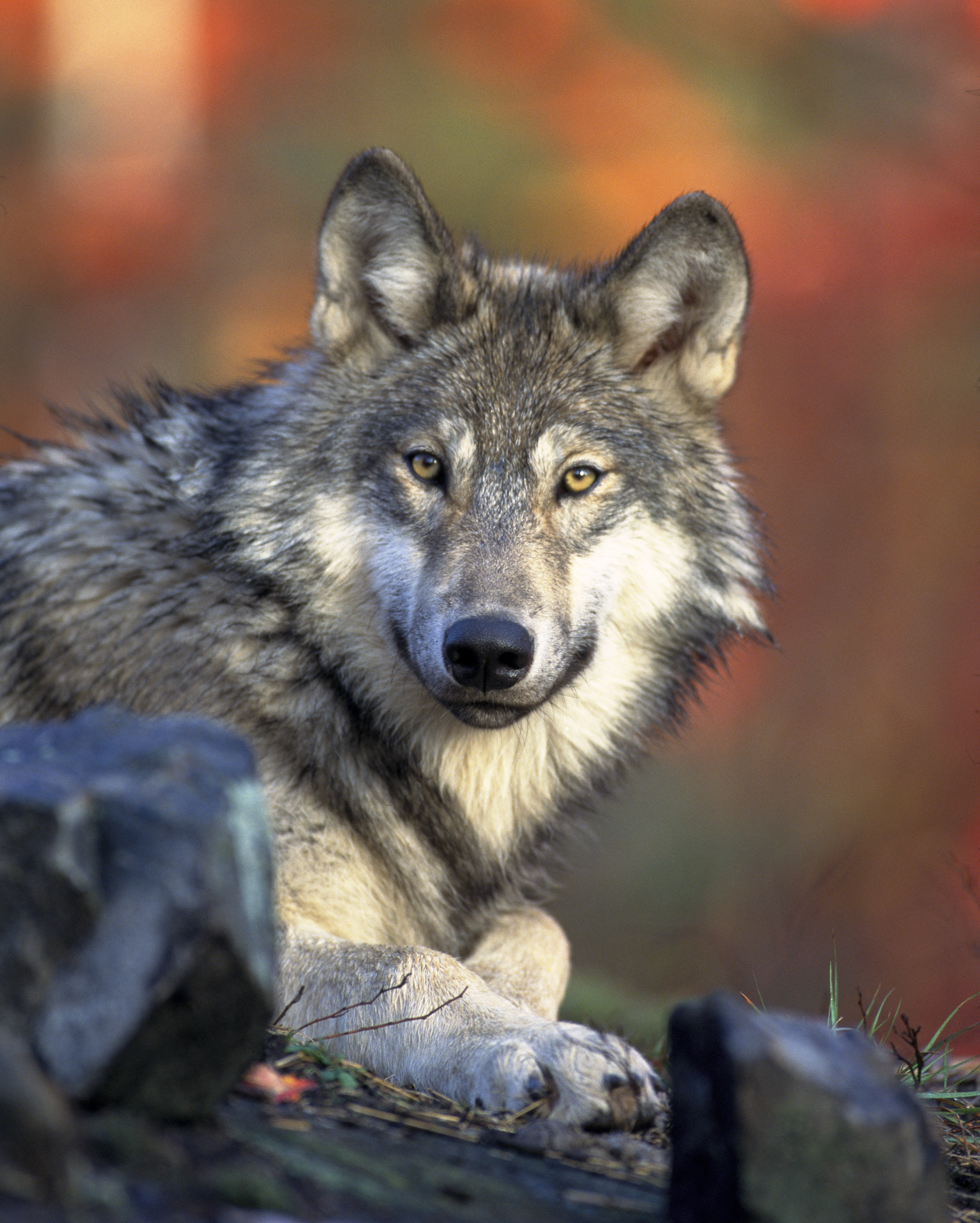
Grey wolf

Elk are a very important species in Banff National Park, partly because they represent a source of food for declining wolves. However they also have harsh impacts on the environment. Large elk populations cause vegetation degradation, human–animal conflicts and destabilization of biological interactions. In 1999, the implementation of the Banff National Park Elk Management Strategy by Parks Canada and the Elk Advisory Committee aimed to monitor and control the population to decrease conflicts and aid ecological process recovery.

Elk handling facilities are areas of pens with loading and unloading ramps where water and food are provided to the elk. They were created to help reduce herd numbers by increasing wariness and encouraging migratory behaviour, deterring the elk from the town of Banff. These measures allowed more predator–prey interactions thanks to the creation of corridors. They also increased elk migration, restored the willow and aspen communities and highlighted the primary role of wolves in elk population management.

The state of grizzly bear populations in Banff is seen as a proxy for ecological integrity. To keep bears away from humans, an electric fence was put up around the summer gondola and parking lot at Lake Louise in 2001. Bear-proof garbage cans, which do not allow bears to access their contents, help to deter them from human sites. The fruit of buffaloberry bushes is eaten by bears, so the bushes have been removed in some areas where the risk of a bear–human encounter is high.

Aversive conditioning deters bears by modifying their behaviour. Deterrents such as noise makers and rubber bullets are used each time the bear performs an undesirable action. Advice is also given to people to avoid an eventual habituation of bears to human presence. If this conditioning is continual the bear will be less likely to continue the undesirable behaviour (crossing into campsites and roads etc.).

Southern mountain caribou management previously aimed to identify what was threatening caribou populations and find solutions to mitigate the threats, but the last caribou in the park was found dead in an avalanche in 2009. There was concern over why more had not been done to save the caribou population. The primary reason for their decline is thought to have been habitat loss and altered predator–prey dynamics. Park management began monitoring the last five caribou in the park in 2002 and taking actions such as reducing impacts of humans, conducting studies of the population, and investigating the possibility of translocating caribou to increase the Banff population.

In the mid-1980s gray wolves recolonized the Bow Valley in Banff National Park. They had been absent for 30 years due to systematic predator control hunting which began in 1850. Wolves filtered back to Banff and recolonized one zone of the Bow Valley in 1985 and another in 1991. A high level of human use surrounding a third zone at Banff townsite has deterred the wolves from that area. The wolves are important in controlling elk populations and improve the balance of the ecosystem. A routine park study to monitor the wolves in Banff has now grown into the Southern Rockies Canine Project – the largest wolf research project in North America. The estimated wolf population in Banff National Park and the surrounding areas is now 60–70 animals.

Plains bison were reintroduced to Banff in 2017. The park has an extensive system of grasslands in backcountry valleys that are perfect for the bison. 16 bison were translocated from Elk Island National Park and initially placed under observation for a year in an enclosed pasture within a 1,200 square kilometres (460 sq mi) reintroduction site near Panther River Valley. After 18 months of acclimation, the herd was released into the reintroduction site and as of 2024, the herd had grown to over 130.

==== Strategies ====
Wildlife crossings have been successful in Banff National Park at reducing the number of animals killed on the roads. There is also 82 kilometres (51 mi) of fencing at the edge of the highway in the park to prevent animals from getting onto the roads. Since it was put up, this has reduced collisions between wildlife and vehicles by over 80 per cent.

Train tracks still pose challenges to conservationists. Many bears have been killed by trains, often because they are attracted to grain spills along the tracks. Transportation corridors provide openings for plants which are also utilized by bears. A partnership between Parks Canada and Canadian Pacific Railway allowed the creation of the first Railway-Bear Conflict Mitigation Symposium in 2010. Initiatives included building wooden pegboards to fence off the sides of tracks and chemically treating grains to deter the bears. After a complete review of the research projects, the development of some of them has been authorized, including grain alteration and the use of cameras to study the behavioural response of bears to trains.

In 2011, Parks Canada began to study the effectiveness of electro-mats, large mats that give a small electric shock to animals that step on them, as a potential deterrent around train tracks. A trial instalment of the mats was placed in Banff to test their effectiveness in deterring animals like bears from gaining access to the fenced train tracks inside the park.

General prohibitions implemented to ensure wildlife respect include the prohibition of feeding, touching, or holding animals in captivity, and the disturbance or destruction of bird nests.

=== Fire management ===
Parks Canada management practices, notably fire suppression, since Banff National Park was established have impacted the park's ecosystem. Since 1983, Parks Canada has adopted a strategy that employed prescribed burns, which helps to mimic effects of natural fires.

== Human impact ==
=== Environment ===
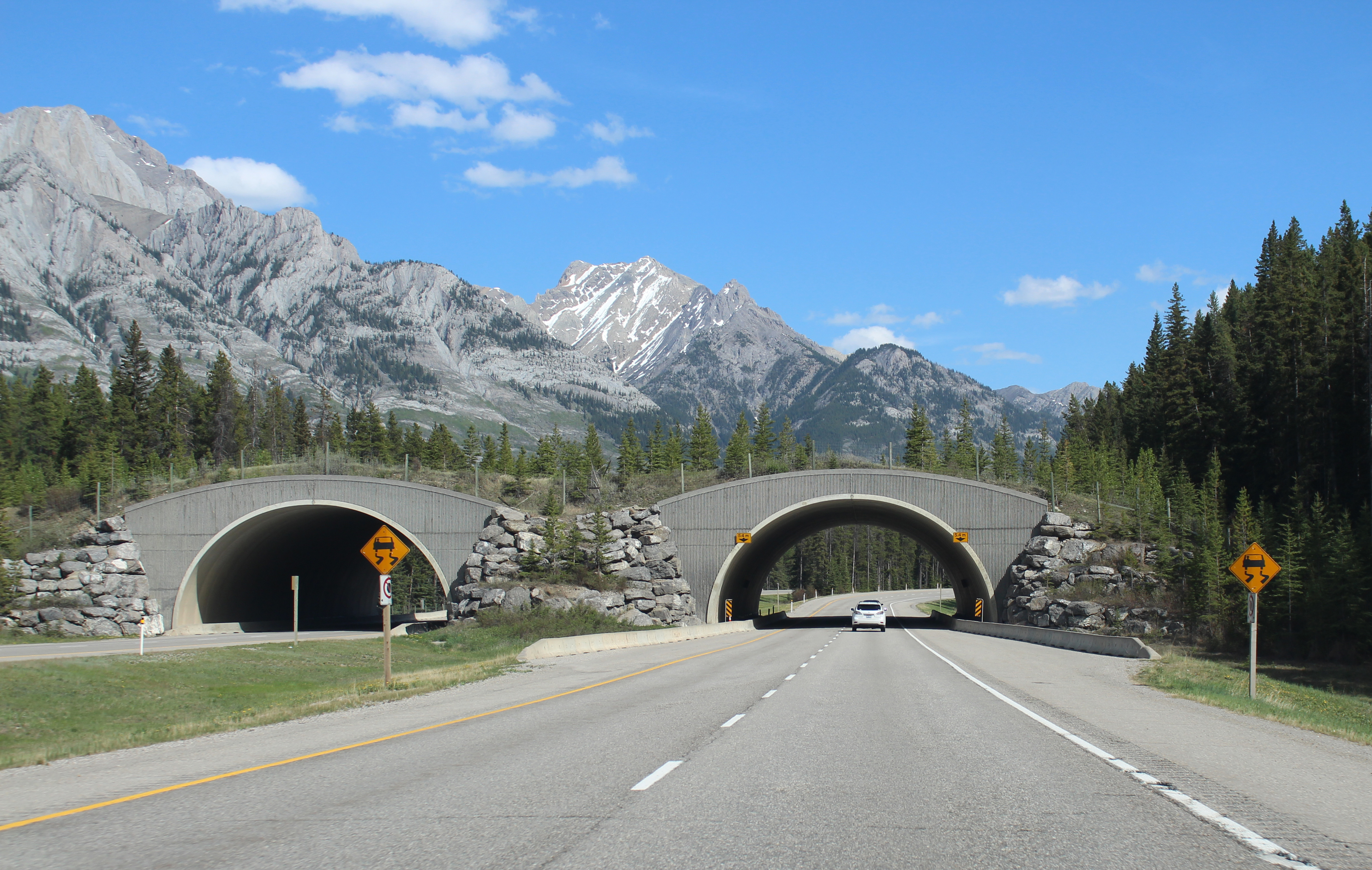
Wildlife overpass

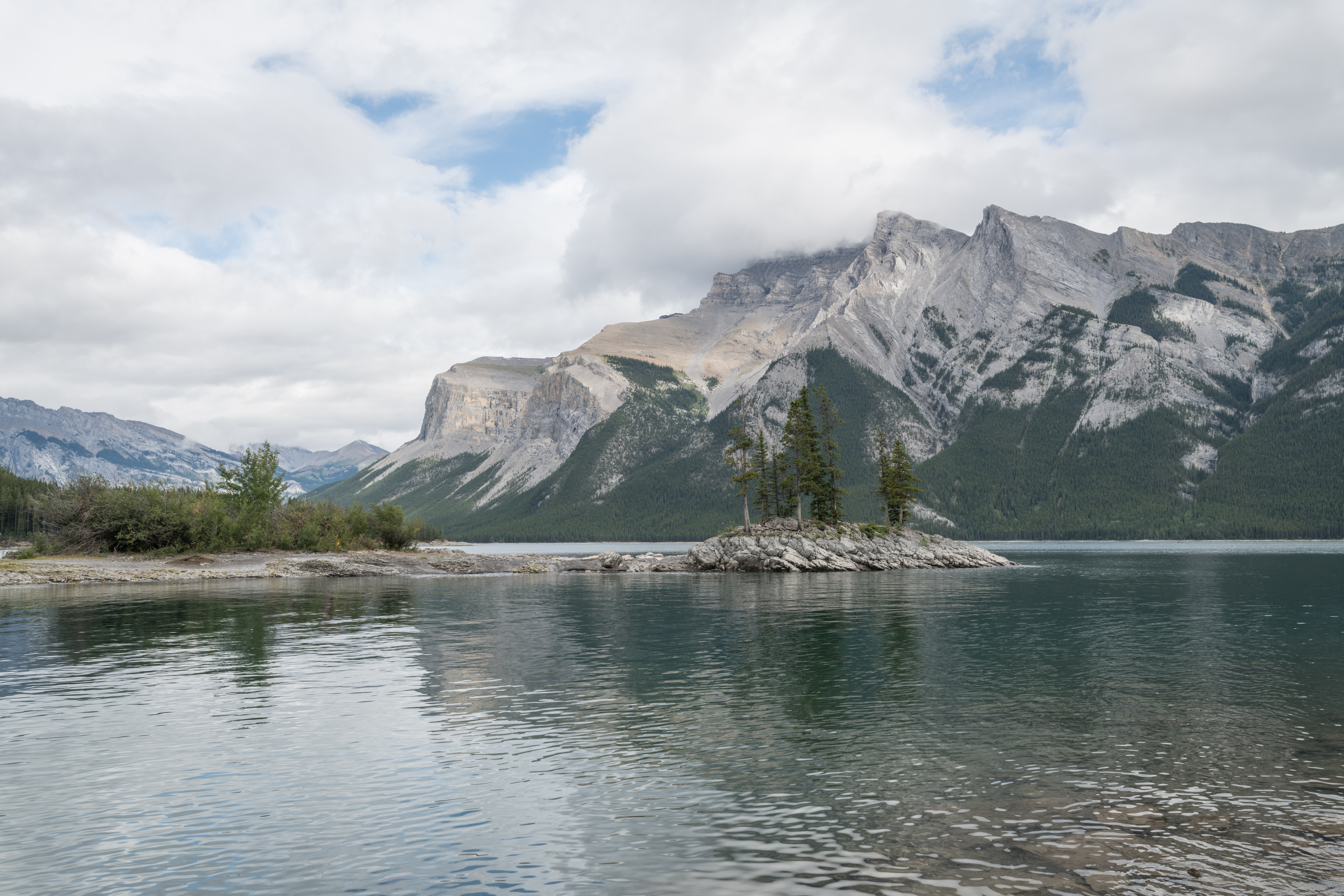
Lake Minnewanka

Since the 19th century, humans have impacted Banff's environment through introduction of non-native species, controls on other species, and development in the Bow Valley, among other human activities. Bison once lived in the valleys of Banff and were hunted by indigenous people, but the last bison were killed off in 1850s. In 2017 a small herd of sixteen plains bison were reintroduced into an eastern section of the park. Elk are not indigenous to Banff, and were introduced in 1917 with 57 elk brought in from Yellowstone National Park. The introduction of elk to Banff, combined with controls on coyote and wolves by Parks Canada beginning in the 1930s, has caused imbalance of the ecosystem. Other species that have been displaced from the Bow Valley include grizzly bears, cougars, lynx, wolverine, otter, and moose. Beginning in 1985, gray wolves were recolonizing areas in the Bow Valley. However, the wolf population has struggled, with 32 wolf deaths along the Trans-Canada Highway between 1987 and 2000, leaving only 31 wolves in the area.

The population of bull trout and other native species of fish in Banff's lakes has also dwindled, with the introduction of non-native species including brook trout, and rainbow trout. Lake trout, westslope cutthroat trout, and chiselmouth are rare native species, while chinook salmon, white sturgeon, Pacific lamprey, and Banff longnose dace are likely extirpated locally. The Banff longnose dace, once only found in Banff, is now an extinct species.

The Trans-Canada Highway, passing through Banff, has been problematic, posing hazards for wildlife due to vehicle traffic and as an impediment to wildlife migration. Grizzly bears are among the species impacted by the highway, which together with other developments in Banff, has caused fragmentation of the landscape. Grizzly bears prefer the montane habitat, which has been most impacted by development. Wildlife crossings, including a series of underpasses, and six wildlife overpasses, have been constructed at a number of points along the Trans-Canada Highway to help alleviate this problem.

=== Development ===
In 1978, expansion of Sunshine Village ski resort was approved, with added parking, hotel expansion, and development of Goat's Eye Mountain. Implementation of this development proposal was delayed through the 1980s, while environmental assessments were conducted. In 1989, Sunshine Village withdrew its development proposal, in light of government reservations, and submitted a revised proposal in 1992. This plan was approved by the government, pending environmental review. Subsequently, the Canadian Parks and Wilderness Society (CPAWS) filed a court injunction, which halted the development. CPAWS also put pressure on UNESCO to revoke Banff's World Heritage Site status, over concerns that developments were harming the park's ecological health.

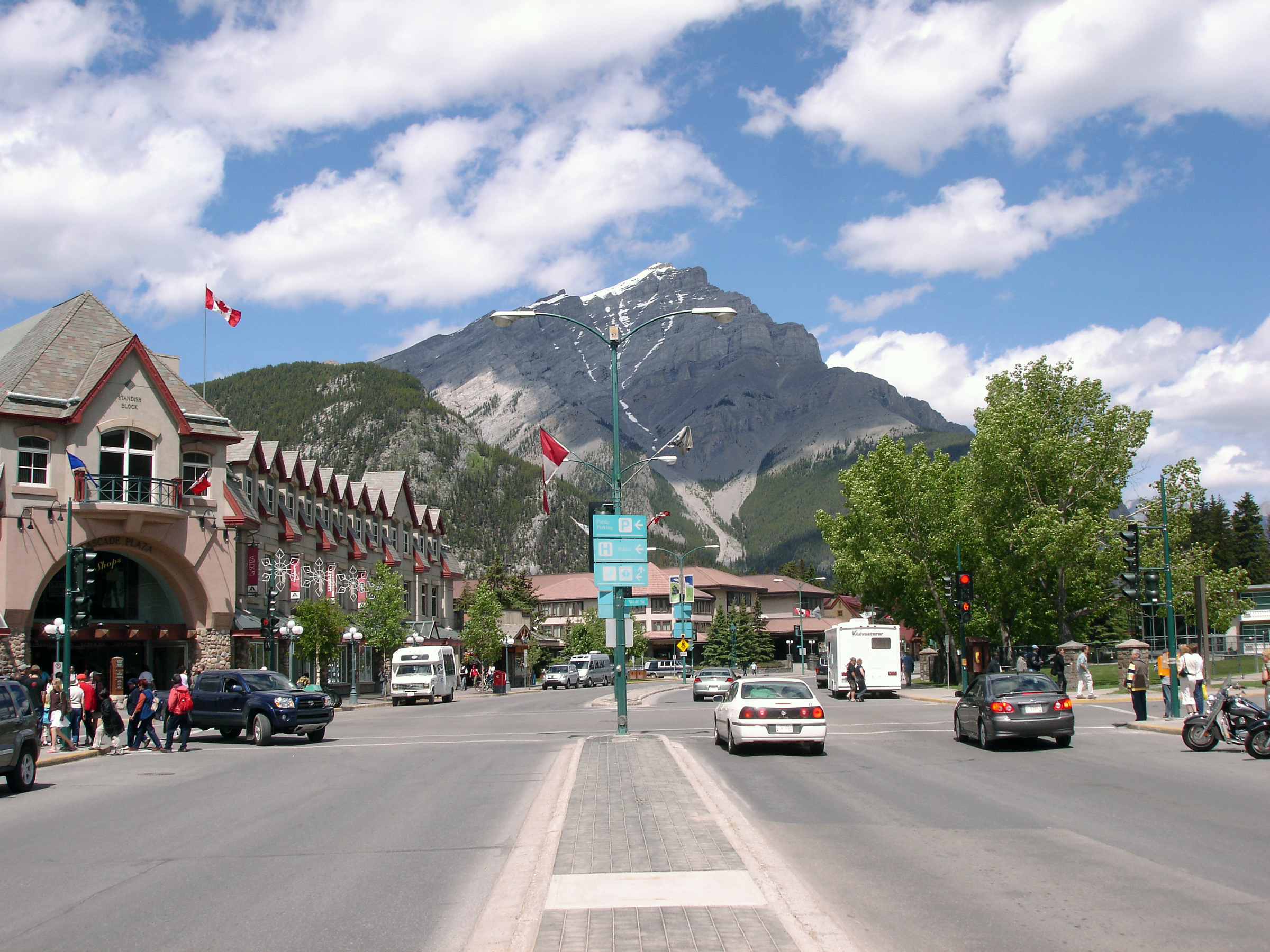
Banff townsite

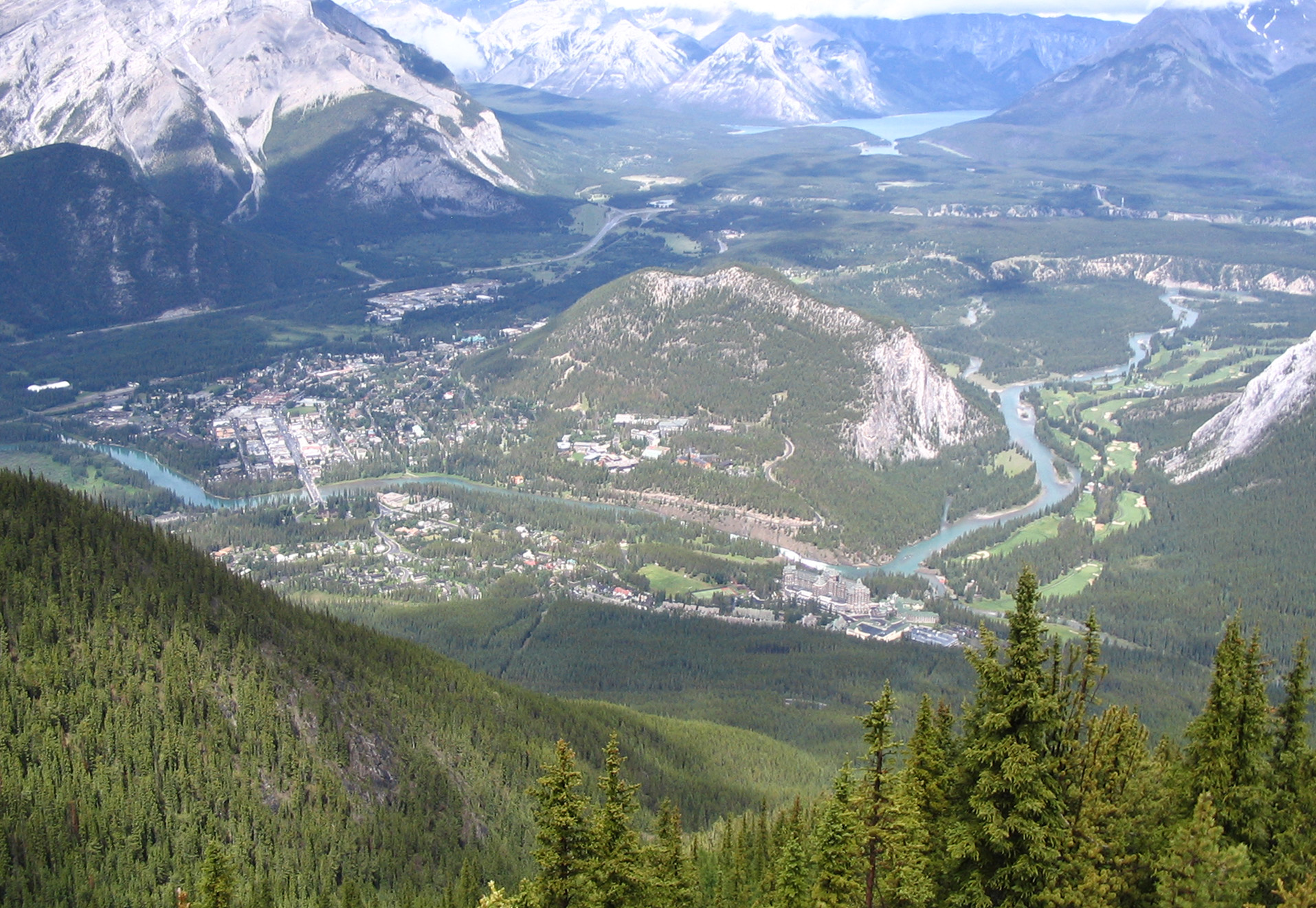
Bow River winding through Banff town

=== Banff–Bow Valley Study ===
While the National Parks Act and the 1988 amendment emphasize ecological integrity, in practice Banff has suffered from inconsistent application of the policies. In 1994, the Banff–Bow Valley Study was mandated by Sheila Copps, the minister responsible for Parks Canada, to provide recommendations on how to better manage human use and development, and maintain ecological integrity. While the two-year Banff–Bow Valley Study was underway, development projects were halted, including the expansion of Sunshine Village, and the twinning of the Trans-Canada Highway between Castle Junction and Sunshine.

The panel issued over 500 recommendations, including limiting the growth of the Banff townsite, capping the town's population at 10,000, placing quotas for popular hiking trails, and curtailing development in the park. Another recommendation was to fence off the townsite to reduce confrontations between people and elk. The proposed fencing was also intended to reduce access to this refuge for elk from predators, such as wolves that tended to avoid the townsite. Upon release of the report, Copps immediately moved to accept the proposal to cap the town population. She also ordered a small airstrip to be removed, along with a buffalo paddock, and cadet camp, that inhibited wildlife movement.

In response to concerns and recommendations raised by the Banff–Bow Valley Study, a number of development plans were curtailed in the 1990s. Plans to add nine holes at the Banff Springs Golf Resort were withdrawn in 1996.

=== Canmore ===
With the cap on growth in the town of Banff, Canmore, located just outside the Banff boundary, has been growing rapidly to serve increasing demands of tourists. Major development proposals for Canmore have included the Three Sisters Golf Resorts, proposed in 1992, which has been the subject of contentious debate, with environmental groups arguing that the development would fragment important wildlife corridors in the Bow Valley.

== See also ==
- Bears and Man, a documentary on bear problems in the park
- List of historic places in Alberta's Rockies
- List of mountains of Alberta
- List of national parks of Canada
- List of trails in Alberta
- List of waterfalls of Alberta
