= RCAF Overseas Headquarters =

The Royal Canadian Air Force Overseas Headquarters, often abbreviated to RCAF Overseas, was responsible for Canadian airmen serving outside Canada during and just after World War II. The headquarters was established on 1 January 1940 and it was based in London. Its main functions were to conduct liaison with the British Air Ministry, to provide a central location for personnel records, and provide general administration. As the War progressed, the Overseas Headquarters gained increasing administrative authority over Canadian personnel but never gained any significant operational responsibility for RCAF units and formations which were integrated into the RAF's command structure.

== Senior officers ==
The following officers were in charge of the RCAF Overseas Headquarters:

=== Senior Officer, RCAF in Great Britain ===
- 1 January to 6 March 1940 F V Heakes - previously the RCAF Liaison Officer in London (15 July 1937 to 31 December 1939)
- 7 March to 3 June 1940 G V Walsh

=== Air Officer Commanding the RCAF in Great Britain ===
- 4 June to 15 October 1940 Air Commodore G V Walsh
- 16 October 1940 to 6 November 1941 Air Vice-Marshal L F Stevenson

=== Air Officer-in-Chief the RCAF in Great Britain ===
- 6 to 24 November 1941 Air Vice-Marshal L F Stevenson
- 25 November 1941 to 15 July 1943 Air Marshal H G Edwards

=== Air Officer Commanding-in-Chief the RCAF in Great Britain ===
- 16 July to 31 December 1943 Air Marshal H G Edwards
- 1 January 1944 to 31 March 1945 Air Marshal L S Breadner
- 1 April 1945 to 22 July 1946 Air Marshal G O Johnson

== See also ==
- RAAF Overseas Headquarters
- RCAF Overseas Headquarters Band
