= Leigh Stevenson =

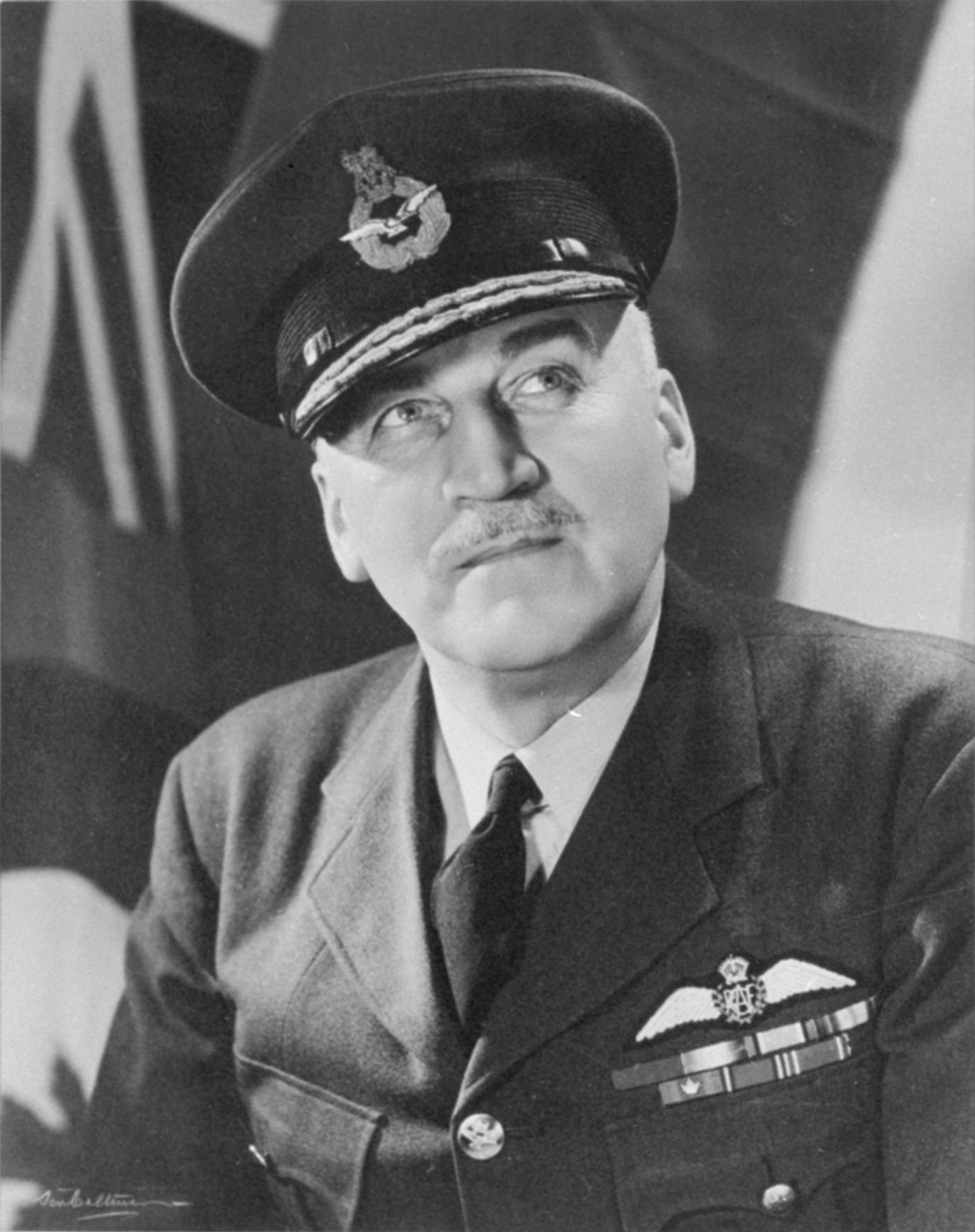

Member of the Legislative Assembly of British Columbia
- In office 1946–1952
- Succeeded by: oo
- Constituency: Vancouver-Point Grey

Personal details
- Born: 24 April 1895 Richibucto, New Brunswick
- Died: 3 March 1989 (aged 93) Vancouver, British Columbia
- Party: Coalition
- Spouse: Lilian Myrtle Comber
- Nickname: Stevie

Military service
- Allegiance: Canada; United Kingdom
- Branch/service: Canadian Expeditionary Force; Royal Flying Corps; Royal Canadian Air Force
- Years of service: c.1915–1919 1921–1945
- Rank: Air Vice Marshal
- Commands: Western Air Command; RCAF Overseas Headquarters; Camp Borden; RCAF Station Winnipeg
- Battles/wars: First World War; Second World War
- Awards: Companion of the Order of the Bath; Mentioned in Despatches; Commander of the Legion of Merit (United States)

Air Vice Marshal Leigh Forbes Stevenson, CB (24 April 1895 – 3 March 1989) was a senior commander in the Royal Canadian Air Force during the Second World War. Early in the First World War he served in the trenches on the Western Front before becoming a pilot in the Royal Flying Corps. After the war he joined the fledgling Canadian Air Force. Stevenson remained in Air Force service when in 1924 the Royal Canadian Air Force was founded and served throughout the inter-war years.

On 16 October 1940 Stevenson was appointed Air Officer Commanding the RCAF in Great Britain (changed to Air Officer-in-Chief the RCAF in Great Britain on 6 November) at the RCAF Overseas Headquarters in London. In 1942 he returned to Canada to take command of Western Air Command. In 1946, he was elected to represent Vancouver-Point Grey in the Legislative Assembly of British Columbia as a member of the Coalition government; he served until 1952. He died at his home in Vancouver in 1989.

Military offices
Preceded by G V Walsh	Air Officer Commanding the RCAF in Great Britain; Air Officer-in-Chief from November 1941; October 1940 – November 1941	Succeeded by Harold Edwards
