= Harold Edwards (RCAF officer) =

Canadian Air Force officer

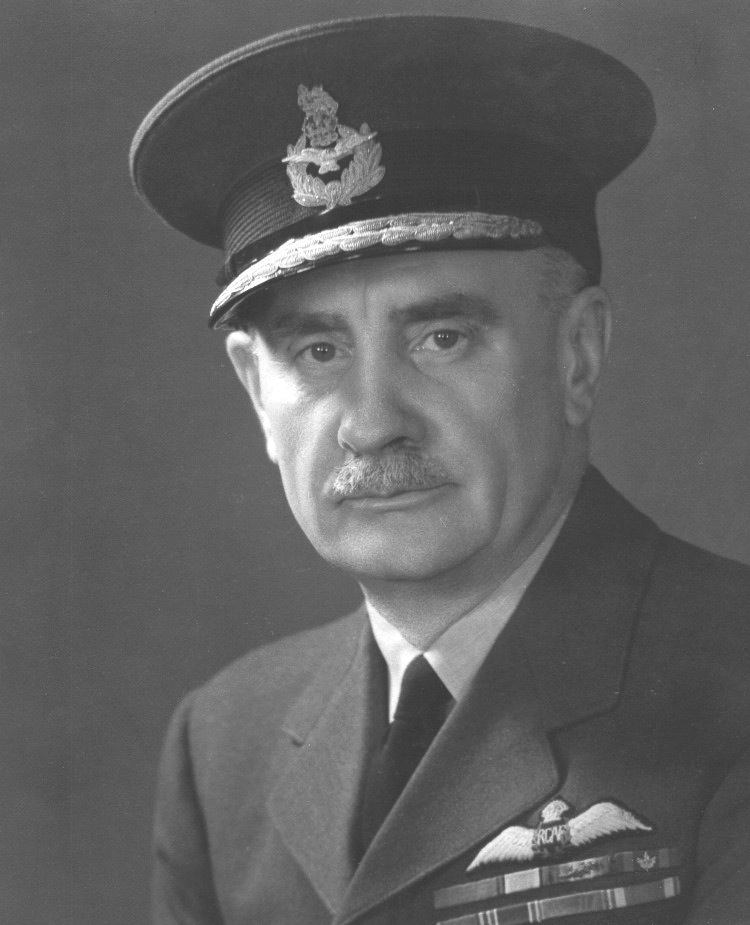
- Edwards in 1943
- Born: 24 December 1892; Chorley, Lancashire, England
- Died: 23 February 1952 (aged 59); Scottsdale, Arizona, United States
- Burial place: Beechwood Cemetery, Ottawa, Canada
- Military career
- Allegiance: United Kingdom; Canada
- Branch: Royal Navy; Royal Air Force; Royal Canadian Air Force
- Service years: 1915–1944
- Rank: Air Marshal
- Nickname: Gus
- Commands: RCAF Overseas
- Conflicts: First World War; Second World War
- Awards: Companion of the Order of the Bath; Mentioned in Despatches (2); Order of St. Stanislaus (Poland); Order of St. Anna (Russia); Commander of the Legion of Merit (United States); Officer of the Legion of Honour (France); Croix de guerre (France); Grand Cross of the Order of the White Lion (Czechoslovakia)

Air Marshal Harold "Gus" Edwards, CB (24 December 1892 – 23 February 1952) was a Canadian Air Force officer who played a prominent role in building the Royal Canadian Air Force (RCAF). From November 1941 to December 1943, Edwards served as Air Officer Commanding-in-Chief Overseas where he was responsible for all RCAF personnel. In June 2012, Edwards was posthumously inducted into Canada's Aviation Hall of Fame for his "outstanding leadership in building Canada's national air force".

== Early life ==
Harold Edwards was born in Chorley, Lancashire, England on 24 December 1892; he immigrated with his family to Glace Bay, Nova Scotia in 1903. At age fourteen, he left school to work as a trapper boy in the coal mines, but also began home study following his shifts. By the age of 18 he qualified as the mine's chief electrician, and by 1915 he had educated himself to a sufficiently high level to be accepted into the Royal Naval Air Service. Edwards earned his pilot's wings in 1916 and graduated as a flight sub-lieutenant.

== First World War ==
During the First World War, Edwards was posted to No. 3 (Naval) Wing at Luxeuil-les-Bains, France, where he shot down one German aircraft, but was then himself shot down and captured. After two failed attempts to escape he succeeded on the third attempt; only to be recaptured and returned to Colmar for the remainder of the war. After repatriation to England, Edwards joined the Royal Air Force (RAF), which had been formed on 1 April 1918 by amalgamating the Royal Naval Air Service and the Army's Royal Flying Corps. In 1919, Edwards held the rank of captain in the RAF and volunteered to fly in the fight against the Bolsheviks in the Russian Revolution in South Russia. He was assigned to No. 47 Squadron under the leadership of Major Raymond Collishaw. For service in Russia, he received the Order of Saint Stanislaus and the Order of St. Anna as well as being Mentioned in Despatches.

== Interwar years ==
After the war, Edwards returned to Canada and joined the newly-formed Canadian Air Force, a few months after its formation on 18 February 1920. Following a short flying refresher he was posted to Ottawa and placed in charge of the personnel branch where he was responsible for documenting Canadians with First World War experience in the RAF then recruiting them into the provisional air force and setting up an air training centre at Camp Borden. By 1924, the Canadian Air Force had grown sufficiently to acquire permanent status as a component of the new Department of Defence. On 1 April 1924, Canada's national air force was accorded royal assent and officially established as the Royal Canadian Air Force.

Following his work to develop a personnel organization for Canada's national air force, Edwards returned to flying duties in June 1924 and was appointed Officer-in-Charge of Victoria Beach, a flying boat detachment of RCAF Station Winnipeg on the south shore of Lake Winnipeg. The program to photograph Canada from the air began in earnest in 1924, with the Manitoba detachments leading the other units in Canada by photographing 27,000 square metres (0.027 km^{2}) in over 180 hours of flying. Edwards demonstrated that aerial photography was equally accurate to ground surveys and saved a time and labour. Edwards also recommended that crew size of the Vickers Viking flying boat be reduced from four to three to carry more stores and safety equipment. He also wrote a report documenting and standardizing how aerial mapping photos were taken. The Manitoba detachment also led other RCAF detachments in forestry patrols, flying 1,020 hours on forest fire patrols, timber cruising and transporting officials to inaccessible regions. The work of Edwards and his compatriots fostered an "air mindedness" in Canada and paved the way for Canada's civil aviation pioneers. Edwards' Commanding Officer reported him to be, "A very capable pilot and efficient officer in every respect – keen and energetic. A good organizer and Commander".

== Dartmouth years ==
In 1934, Edwards was selected to command RCAF Station Dartmouth (now 12 Wing Shearwater), where he formed one of the RCAF's first squadrons after the crippling Depression. No. 5 (Flying Boat) Squadron was created by amalgamating the five RCAF detachments at Dartmouth, Shediac, Gaspé, Sydney and Rimouski. Under his leadership, No. 5 Squadron initiated anti-smuggling air patrols with a Royal Canadian Mounted Police observer on board. The patrols were flown in consort with RCMP marine vessels to thwart illegal rum running along the Nova Scotia coast. Under his direction, No. 5 Squadron initiated the first use of aircraft radios to report suspect vessels to RCAF and RCMP ground stations. He also introduced a tactical grid system to disguise geographic positions to foil rumrunners who eavesdropped on the wireless communications.

After the disastrous 1936 coal mine tragedy at Moose River, the provincial premier requested Edwards' assistance in coordinating the rescue mission. Edwards transmitted messages and coordinated No. 5 Squadron aircraft to fly rescue equipment and personnel to the mine and to transport the injured to hospitals in Halifax; enabling them to receive treatment several days earlier than if transported by land. Millions in North America and Europe heard the rescue described on the radio. It was during these broadcasts that Edwards became known as he explained the RCAF's role in the rescue; his leadership engendered interest in air power and respect for the RCAF.

During the post-Depression period in the mid-1930s the government implemented an Unemployment Relief (UER) Project to create work for destitute and unemployed people and stimulate the economy. The RCAF benefited from the UER Projects by receiving more money and personnel, new aircraft and improved air stations. During 1937 and 1938, Edwards oversaw the UER Project at RCAF Station Dartmouth, which expanded the small seaplane base at Baker's Point into the largest and most important air station in Eastern Canada. He supervised the purchase of land from neighbouring farmers and the construction of new hangars and runways. Edwards' Commanding Officer reported, "In addition to his [regular] duties, Edwards has been in charge of UER Project No. 153 (Dartmouth Air Station) where his sound judgement and untiring energy have been the main factor in carrying out this work under considerable [social upheaval] difficulties".

Under Edwards' command, RCAF Station Dartmouth and No. 5 Squadron were the only RCAF units in Canada declared combat ready at the outbreak of the Second World War. Notwithstanding the RCAF's obsolescent aircraft and lack of experience in modern air warfare, Edwards prepared the station to play a role in the air defence of Halifax's strategic harbour, and the eventual defeat of the ubiquitous U-boats in the Battle of the Atlantic.

== Air Member for Personnel ==
At the outbreak of the Second World War, Canada agreed to be the principal venue for the British Commonwealth Air Training Plan (BCATP), which involved the construction of 107 flying schools and 184 other units at 231 sites across the country. As Air Member for Personnel at RCAF Headquarters in 1940–1941, Edwards was responsible for manning the RCAF and providing the essential personnel support services including discipline, pay, medical, chaplains, senior appointments, promotions, retirements, postings and reserve forces, as well as compiling Personnel Staff Estimates and supervising Personnel Appropriations. To help meet the immediate requirement for so many qualified flying instructors, Air Marshal Billy Bishop turned to the American Clayton Knight Committee to facilitate the recruitment of hundreds of American civilian flying instructors and staff pilots, and Edwards dealt with the complexities of absorbing these Americans into the RCAF while respecting politically sensitive diplomatic protocols to avoid violating United States neutrality.

The BCATP was able to provide over 131,000 aircrew to Commonwealth air forces who were critical in replacing the acute loss of pilots during the Battle of Britain and the loss of more than 55,000 aircrew in the bomber offensive over occupied Europe. The BCATP enabled the Commonwealth nations to man their air forces in Europe, North Africa and the Middle and Far East.

== AOC-in-Chief RCAF Overseas ==
In January 1942, in the midst of the Second World War, Edwards was transferred to London, England as the "Air Officer Commanding-in-Chief RCAF Overseas". Edwards' wide range of experience in administration, his concern for the welfare of both officers and other ranks, made him the best choice to command all RCAF personnel overseas, not only in England but also in the Middle and Far East.

According to BCATP Article XV, Canadian graduate aircrews were to form 35 RCAF squadrons after arrival in England. However, when Edwards arrived in London he discovered that Canadians were dispersed over "Hell's half acre" within the RAF. RCAF Officers in the posting departments in England had received little direction to concentrate Canadians into RCAF squadrons and were uncertain of the location of more than 6,000 Canadians posted into RAF squadrons. Edwards established a Records and Statistics Directorate to track the whereabouts of all RCAF personnel. He increased RCAF medical staff in RAF hospitals and supported the building of the plastic surgery hospital in East Grinstead. He improved the postal system and introduced a Canadian newsletter, Wings Abroad. Edwards established seven district headquarters, to provide a direct channel of communication for RCAF personnel in the field, on matters administered by the RCAF (pay, allowances, promotion, etc.). Similarly, with the ever-increasing number of RCAF personnel in the Mediterranean and Far East, district headquarters were opened in Cairo, Egypt and India.

== Canadianization ==
With so many Canadians serving in RAF squadrons, Edwards was concerned that Article XV was not being implemented as agreed by the signatories to the BCATP. Moreover, the large number of Canadians embedded in RAF squadrons obfuscated the RCAF's contribution to the air war and Canada was not being justly recognized for its contribution. Edwards met with his RAF counterparts to revitalize Article XV, a process that became known as "Canadianization", where Canadians would form distinct RCAF squadrons, which would fight as Canadian units under Canadian command. This plan received harsh criticism from the highest ranks of the RAF; his assertiveness made him unpopular around the Air Ministry. Conflicting direction from Ottawa urging him to press for "Canadianization" but not to antagonize the Air Ministry took a toll on his health. Eighteen RCAF fighter squadrons, organized into six Canadian wings, formed the largest Commonwealth contingent in the RAF's Second Tactical Air Force. Similarly, 15 bomber squadrons in No. 6 Group RCAF in RAF Bomber Command earned recognition of Canada's major role in carrying the fight to the enemy in the night skies over Nazi occupied Europe. In the same vein, six RCAF anti-submarine and anti-shipping squadrons provided yeoman service in RAF Coastal Command. By the end of the Second World War, RCAF BCATP establishments and squadrons in Europe constituted the fourth largest Allied air force.

For his leadership in RCAF's overall contribution to the Allied victory in the Second World War, Air Marshal Edwards received awards of distinction from the United Kingdom, the United States, France and Czechoslovakia.

== Retirement ==
Exhausted from RCAF work, Edwards' failing health forced him to return to Canada on 31 December 1943. He retired from the RCAF on 29 September 1944 and died on 23 February 1952, at the age of 59, in Scottsdale, Arizona. Six days later the RCAF buried its first Air Marshal with national honours in Ottawa's Beechwood Cemetery on 29 February 1952. On 15 June 2012, sixty years after his death, Air Marshal Edwards was reinterred beside his comrades-in-arms in the National Military Cemetery, located within Beechwood Cemetery.

His son Billy Edwards was profiled in Allan King's 1969 documentary film A Married Couple.

== Awards ==
- 16 December 1919 – Mentioned for valuable services whilst in captivity (London Gazette)
- 19 January 1920 – Order of St. Stanislaus w/sword and bow (Russia)
- 15 March 1920 – Mentioned in Despatches
- 23 March 1920 – Order of St. Anne w/sword and bow (Russia)
- 1 January 1943 – Companion, Order of the Bath
- 13 August 1946 – Commander, Legion of Merit (United States of America)
- 12 September 1947 – Croix de Guerre avec palme (France)
- 12 September 1947 – Officier de la Légion d'Honneur (France)
- 5 March 1948 – Order of the White Lion For Victory – Star, First Class (Czechoslovakia)
- 14 June 2012 – Canada's Aviation Hall of Fame

== Promotions ==
- 3 February 1916 – Flight Sub Lieutenant
- 1 October 1917 – Flight Lieutenant
- 29 September 1926 – Squadron Leader
- 1 April 1936 – Wing Commander
- 1 April 1939 – Group Captain
- 1 February 1940 – Air Commodore
- 5 August 1941 – Air Vice Marshal
- 20 June 1942 – Air Marshal

Military offices
Preceded by W R Kenny	Air Member for Personnel; February 1940 – November 1941	Succeeded by J A Sully
Preceded by Leigh Stevenson	Air Officer-in-Chief RCAF Overseas; Air Officer Commanding-in-Chief from July 1943; November 1941 – December 1943	Succeeded by Lloyd Breadner
