= Healy Creek =

Stream in Alberta, Canada

Coordinates: 51.13332°N 115.70211°W

Healy Creek is a stream in Banff National Park, Alberta, Canada. It is a tributary of the Bow River.

Healy Creek has the name of John J. Healy, a businessperson in the mining industry.

During World War II, an alternative service camp for conscientious objectors, largely Mennonites, was established at Healy Creek.

== See also ==
- List of rivers of Alberta
