= Unemployment and Farm Relief Act =

1931 Act of the Parliament of Canada

Parliament of Canada
- Long title: An Act to confer certain powers upon the Governor in Council in respect to unemployment and farm relief, and the maintenance of peace, order and good government in Canada
- Citation: Unemployment and Farm Relief Act
- Enacted by: Parliament of Canada
- Assented to: August 3, 1931

The Unemployment and Farm Relief Act (French: Loi remédiant au chômage et aidant à l’agriculture) was introduced by Prime Minister R.B. Bennett, and enacted in July 1931 by the Parliament of Canada, enabling public works projects to be set up in Canada's national parks during the Great Depression. This legislation followed the Unemployment Relief Act, passed in 1930, which provided grants for municipal public works projects.

The Act provided funds to municipalities and the provinces for road building projects, as well as funds set aside for projects in the national parks. The Act's Section 4:

"The Governor in Council shall have full power to make all such orders and regulations as may be deemed necessary or desirable for relieving distress, providing employment and, within the competence of Parliament, maintaining peace, order and good government throughout Canada."

also enabled the authorities to combat unrest based on "pernicious" revolutionary doctrines, such as were espoused by the Communist Party of Canada.

The Act had an expiry date of March 1, 1932.
