= Air Board (Canada) =

Canada's first governing body for aviation (1919–1923)

Air Board of Canada
- Ensign of the Air Board from 1922–23.

Agency overview
- Formed: 6 June 1919
- Dissolved: 1 January 1923
- Superseding agency: Department of National Defence (Canada)
- Headquarters: Ottawa, Ontario
- Agency executive: Arthur Sifton 1919–1921 Hugh Guthrie 1921 George Perry Graham 1921–1922, Chairman

The Air Board was Canada's first governing body for aviation, operating from 1919 to 1923. The Canadian government established the Air Board by act of Parliament on June 6, 1919, with the purpose of controlling all flying within Canada. Canada was the first country to legislate and implement rules governing the entire domain of aviation.

== Functions ==
The Air Board had three functions: devising a means of, and administering Canadian air defence; controlling and conducting all civil (non-military) government flying operations; and providing rules and regulations for flying within Canada, which included licensing, issuing air regulations and managing air traffic. The Board consisted of three sections: 1) the Department of the Controller of Civil Aviation which controlled all civil flying; 2) the Directorate of Flying Operations which controlled civil flying operations of the Air Board; and 3) the Headquarters of the Canadian Air Force (CAF), which operated at Camp Borden.

== Flying operations ==
Five air stations were established for civil flying operations in 1920:

- Halifax, Nova Scotia, a former US Navy seaplane base responsible for the overhaul of Curtiss HS-2L flying boats, fishery and forestry patrols, and aerial photography.
- Roberval, Quebec, a seaplane base on Lac Saint-Jean responsible primarily for forestry patrols and surveying.
- Jericho Beach, British Columbia, a seaplane base responsible for fishery, forestry, anti-smuggling patrols.
- Morley, Alberta, a landplane base responsible primarily for forestry patrols.
- Rockcliffe, Ontario, a landplane and seaplane base responsible primarily for photo surveying.

Additional stations were added in subsequent years:

- Victoria Beach, Manitoba, established in 1921 as a seaplane base responsible primarily for forestry patrols.
- High River, Alberta, moved from Morley in 1921 due to poor flying weather.
- The Northern Ontario Mobile Unit, a temporary seaplane base operated from boxcars on a Canadian National Railway siding in Sioux Lookout, Ontario for the 1921 flying season responsible primarily for forestry patrols.
- Temporary seaplane bases at Whitney, Ontario and Parry Sound, Ontario for the 1922 flying season, responsible primarily for forestry patrols.

== Members ==
List of members of the board from 1920:

- Arthur Sifton, Chairman 1919–1921 and Minister of Customs and Inland Revenue (Canada)
- Hugh Guthrie - Chairman 1921 - appointed to replace Sifton
- George Perry Graham - Chairman 1921–22 - appointed to replace Guthrie
- Oliver Mowat Biggar, Vice Chairman 1919–1922 and Judge Advocate General
- Sydney Chilton Mewburn, Member and Minister of Militia and Defence (Canada)
- Charles Ballantyne, Member and Minister of Naval Service
- Dr. Robert M. Coulter – Member and Deputy Postmaster General
- John Armistead Wilson, Member and Assistant Deputy Minister for Naval Service – later Controller of Civil Aviation with Department of National Defence and Transport Canada 1922–1941
- Edward S. Busby – Chief Inspector of Department of Customs and Inland Revenue
- Willoughby Gwatkin – Inspector General 1919–22

== Senior staff ==
- Air Commodore Arthur Kellam Tylee - Air Officer Commanding, Canadian Air Force until 1 March 1921
- Wing Commander Ronald Francis Redpath - Officer Commanding, Canadian Air Force from 22 March to 12 July 1921
- Lieutenant Colonel Robert Leckie – Superintendent of Flying Operations, retitled Director of Flying Operations in November 1920
- Lieutenant Colonel / Wing Commander James Stanley Scott – Superintendent of Certificates Branch, retitled Controller of Civil Aviation Branch in November 1920. Also held the post of Officer Commanding, Canadian Air Force from 12 July 1921 to 1 July 1922.
- Lieutenant Colonel Ernest Walter Stedman – Director of Technical Services, retitled Director of Technical and Supply Services in 1921
- Wing Commander James Lindsay Gordon - Acting Director, Canadian Air Force from 1 July 1922
- Major Alexander Macdonald Shook – Secretary

== Succession ==
In 1922 the Air Board was combined with the Department of Militia and Defence and the Department of Naval Service to form the Department of National Defence (DND). January 1, 1923, however, was set as the formal change-over date to allow time for reorganization. The CAF, which had been a small non-permanent air militia directed by the Air Board and originally formed to provide refresher flying training to veterans, was reorganized and became responsible for all Canadian aviation, including the control of civil aviation. Both the Controller of Civil Aviation Branch and responsibility for civil government air operations remained under DND (though they were moved in and out of the RCAF's organization) until 1936. In November 1936 the Civil Aviation Branch was transferred to the new Department of Transport, which would control all civil flying except for work directly related to defence.

== See also ==
- Air Board (Australia)
- Canadian Aviation Corps
- History of aviation in Canada
