= J L Gordon =

J. L. Gordon may refer to:

- Lindsay Gordon, James Lindsay Gordon, Canadian air marshal
- Judah Leib Gordon, known as Leon Gordon, Hebrew poet

== See also ==
- Gordon (surname)
