= William Sharpe =

William Sharpe may refer to:

- William Sharpe (burgess), served in the Virginia House of Burgesses, 1629
- William Sharpe (governor) (fl. 1710), governor of Barbados
- William Sharpe (North Carolina politician) (1742–1818), delegate to the Continental Congress from North Carolina
- William Edward Thompson Sharpe (1834–1909), British politician
- William Henry Sharpe (1868–1942), merchant and political figure in Manitoba, Canada
- William Percy Sharpe (1871–1942), American Democratic politician serving as mayor of Nashville
- William Sharpe (surgeon) (c. 1882–1960), American brain surgeon who developed treatment for retardation and palsy in children
- William Sharpe (Alberta politician) (1887–1964), provincial politician from Alberta, Canada
- William Sharpe (footballer) (fl. 1890), English footballer
- William C. Sharpe, American cultural historian
- William R. Sharpe Jr. (1928–2009), member of the West Virginia Senate
- William F. Sharpe (born 1934), Nobel Prize-winning American economist
- William Frederick Nelson Sharpe (1892–1915), Canadian aviation pioneer, first Canadian pilot to die in World War I

== Others ==
- Bill Sharpe (athlete) (born 1932), American triple jumper
- Bill Sharpe (WCSC-TV) (born 1951), news anchor for Charleston, South Carolina's CBS station WCSC-TV
- Bill Sharpe (musician) (born 1952), keyboardist of Shakatak
- Bill Sharpe (bassist), American bass guitarist, cooperated with Dave Koz on Memories of a Winter's Night

== See also ==
- William Sharp (disambiguation)
