= Roberval Air Station =

Former air station in Roberval, Quebec, Canada

The Roberval Air Station was a station of the Canadian Air Board's Flying Operations Branch located in Roberval, Quebec. Roberval was one of five stations established by the Flying Operations Branch during its first summer of operations in 1920. The station operated Curtiss HS-2L aircraft on photographic survey operations in coordination with the Government of Quebec.

The first HS-2L arrived at the station by air from Dartmouth on 19 July 1920 and the two assigned aircraft flew a total of 73 hours before closing down for the winter. Photographic survey operations were continued in 1921, including laying down fuel caches as far as Lake Mistassini to expand operations in future years and totaling 178 flying hours.

A third aircraft was added to the station's strength for the 1922 flying season, but the station did not open until 29 June due to delays in reaching an agreement with the provincial government for funding. Operations in 1922 extended north to Lake Mistassini, making use of a temporary base on Stacker Lake. One aircraft was detached to conduct a survey of forests in the Sainte-Marguerite and Natashquan River basins. The aircraft was wrecked on takeoff on 21 September en route to Roberval, but the crew and their equipment, notes and photographs returned to Quebec City by boat. Operations for 1922 totaled 186 flying hours.

Following the cancellation of part-time training for military pilots on 31 March 1922, the Air Board restructured its flying operations, merging the Flying Operations Branch into the Canadian Air Force in June. Changes to the organization of the air stations were deferred to the fall to avoid administrative issues during the flying season. On 25 November 1922 the Roberval Air Station was renamed CAF Unit Roberval and the civilian personnel were commissioned or enlisted into the Canadian Air Force. Early in 1923, the Department of National Defence transferred the station to the Government of Quebec, who contracted the Dominion Aerial Exploration Company to continue survey work in the region. The Dominion Aerial Exploration Company began operating from Roberval in July 1923 using two HS-2L aircraft loaned from the Canadian Air Force.

The last RCAF aircraft (an HS-2L) on loan to the provincial government was struck off strength on 31 July 1927.
