= Canadian Air Force (1918–1920) =

Canadian air force squadrons during the First World War

- Aviation canadienne
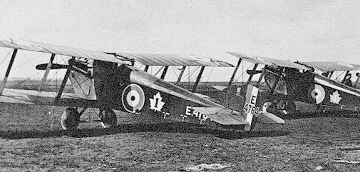
- Dolphins of No.1 (Fighter) Squadron, CAF
- Active: 1918–1920
- Country: Canada
- Allegiance: George V
- Type: Air force
- Role: Aerial warfare
- Engagements: World War I

Commanders
- Commander-in-Chief: George V
- Minister of Militia and Defence: Sydney Chilton Mewburn
- Director of Air Services: Donald MacLaren
- Commander of the Canadian Air Force: Billy Bishop

Insignia
- Roundel

Aircraft flown
- Bomber: Airco DH.9A
- Fighter: R.A.F. S.E.5A; Sopwith Dolphin

The Canadian Air Force (CAF) was a contingent of two Canadian air force squadrons – one fighter and one bomber – authorized by the British Air Ministry in August 1918 during the close of the First World War. The unit was independent from the Canadian Expeditionary Force and the Royal Air Force (RAF).

In addition to the two squadrons, a CAF Directorate of Air Services was formed, which was a branch of the General Staff of the Overseas Military Forces of Canada. The CAF's first commander, Lt. Col. W. A. Bishop began setting up the squadrons in August 1918. The two squadrons never fought during the war, which ended on 11 November 1918. The squadrons were administered by No. 1 Wing CAF, which was formed in March 1919.

Both squadrons were stationed in the United Kingdom at Upper Heyford and later, Shoreham-By-Sea, Sussex. All aircraft, equipment and training facilities were provided by Britain. Recruiting, pay and clothing, however, was a Canadian responsibility.

The British government cut funding for the squadrons in June 1919. The Canadian government decided that a permanent peacetime air force was not needed and so both squadrons ceased operations: No. 1 Squadron on January 28, 1920, and No. 2 Squadron on February 5, 1920. Aircraft and associated equipment were sent back to Canada. The Directorate of Air Services was dissolved on 5 August 1920.

This Canadian Air Force was Canada's second attempt at creating a relatively independent air force, the first being the creation of the Canadian Aviation Corps in 1914. Another Canadian Air Force would be established in 1920 as part of the Air Board in Canada and would exist until the Royal Canadian Air Force was established in 1924.

== Squadrons ==
The two Canadian squadrons were designated a wing, which was commanded by a Wing Commander. The squadrons were:

- No. 1 (Fighter) Squadron (or No. 81 Squadron RAF)
- No. 2 (Day Bomber) Squadron (or No. 123 Squadron RAF)

== Primary operational aircraft ==
The Royal Flying Corps provided three types of aircraft. No. 2 Squadron also had the use of at least three captured Fokker D.VIIs.

No. 1 Squadron

- Royal Aircraft Factory S.E.5A fighter
- Sopwith Dolphin fighter

No. 2 Squadron

- Airco DH.9A bomber

== See also ==
- History of the Royal Canadian Air Force
- Royal Flying Corps of Canada
- Royal Canadian Naval Air Service
