= William Sharp =

William Sharp may refer to:

== Arts and entertainment ==
- William Sharp (engraver) (1749–1824), English engraver
- William Sharp (lithographer) (1803–1875), English-born lithographer and painter; lived in Boston, Massachusetts
- William Sharp (writer) (1855–1905), Scottish author and poet, pseudonym Fiona MacLeod

== Politics ==
- William G. Sharp (1859–1922), American congressman (1909–14); Ambassador to France (1914)
- William Sharp (Australian politician) (1844–1929), New South Wales politician

== Science ==
- William Sharp (homeopath) (1805–1896), English early science educator and homeopath
- William Sharp (surgeon) (1729–1810), surgeon to George III and musician
- William Sharp (scientist) (born 1936), American scientist and entrepreneur

== Sports ==
- William Sharp (footballer) (1889–1915), Scottish footballer
- Billy Sharp (born 1986), English footballer
- Will Sharp (born 1986), Nigerian-born English rugby league player
- Bill Sharp (baseball) (born 1950), outfielder in Major League Baseball
- Bill Sharp (footballer) (1915–2006), Australian rules footballer

== Other ==
- Sir William Sharp, 6th Baronet (1729–1780), Scottish soldier of fortune
- William F. Sharp (1885–1947), American World War II general

== See also ==
- Michael William Sharp (1776–1840), English painter
- William Sharp Bush (1786–1812), U.S. marine
- William Sharp Macleay (1792–1865), British entomologist
- William Sharp McKechnie (1863–1930), Scottish lecturer and author
- William Sharpe (disambiguation)
