= Canadian Air Force (1920–1924) =

Canada's post First World War air force to 1924

- Aviation canadienne
- Active: 1920–1924
- Disbanded: 31 March 1924 (succeeded by Royal Canadian Air Force on 1 April 1924)
- Country: Canada
- Allegiance: George V
- Type: Air force
- Role: Aerial warfare
- Mottos: Latin: Sic Itur ad Astra "Such is the Pathway to the Stars"

Commanders
- Commander-in-Chief: George V
- Commander of the Canadian Air Force: A. K. Tylee; R. F. Redpath; J. S. Scott; J. L. Gordon

Insignia
- Roundel

Aircraft flown
- Bomber: Airco DH.9A
- Fighter: Royal Aircraft Factory S.E.5
- Trainer: Avro 504

The Canadian Air Force (CAF) was the initial, non-permanent peacetime air force formed by Canada after the First World War. When the Air Board was formed in 1919 to manage Canadian aviation, one of its responsibilities was air defence; the CAF was formed to meet this responsibility. The CAF was officially retitled the Royal Canadian Air Force (RCAF) on 12 March 1923, and then dissolved on 31 March 1924 to allow the permanent Royal Canadian Air Force (RCAF) to be formed the following day.

== History ==
Prior to 1920, Canadian airmen flew with the Royal Flying Corps and the Royal Naval Air Service. Canada had tried to implement two other relatively independent "air forces" before 1920. The Canadian Aviation Corps, consisting of one aircraft, was formed in 1914 to provide service in Europe during the First World War. In 1918, a contingent of two squadrons known as the Canadian Air Force was formed as another attempt to provide a Canadian military aviation presence in Europe during the First World War.

This new CAF began as a small non-permanent air militia set up and managed by the Air Board. Its purpose was to give refresher air and ground courses to veterans and operated at Camp Borden. The courses were to be 28 days long and were meant to be given every two years. The training scheme was short-lived, however, and training was ended on 31 March 1922.

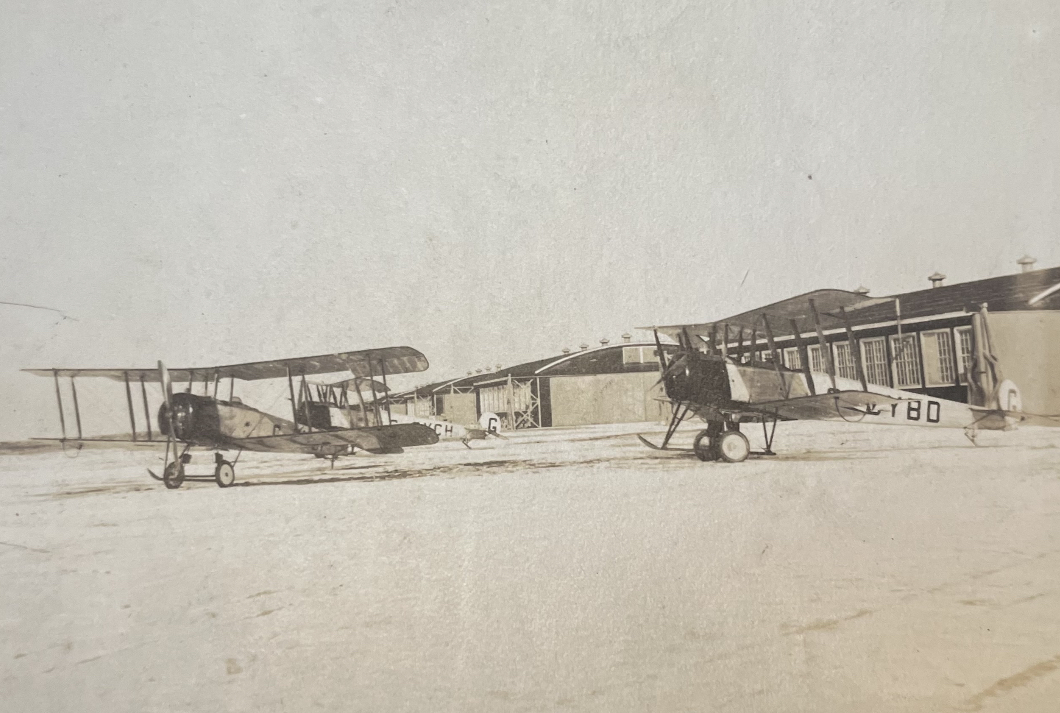
Avro 504’s of the Canadian Air Force at Camp Borden, c.1921

Between 1920 and 1922, 1,271 airmen and 550 officers completed training at Camp Borden. In 1922, the Air Board was merged with the Department of Militia and Defence and the Department of Naval Service to form the Department of National Defence, officially effective 1 January 1923. Under the new organization, the Director of the Canadian Air Force reported to the Chief of the General Staff and the other functions of the Air Board (regulation of civil aviation, aviation technical services, and civil government flying operations) were reorganized under the Director. The six civil air stations previously under the Air Board's Director of Flying Operations (Vancouver, High River, Victoria Beach, Ottawa, Roberval, and Dartmouth) were redesignated CAF units effective 25 November 1922.

The first Air Officer Commanding of the Canadian Air Force was Arthur Kellam Tylee with the formation authorised an initial provisional strength of one Wing Commander, one Flight Lieutenant, one Warrant Officer, one Flight Sergeant and one Sergeant. In June 1920 the provisional strength of 1.340 officers and 3905 airmen (non commissioned officers and other ranks) was authorised.

In 1922, the CAF's Inspector-General Sir Willoughby Gwatkin began advocating for the "Royal" prefix. In 1923, after the CAF was reorganized when the Department of National Defence was formed, formal application was made and the title was granted in February 1923. The Canadian government finally approved of the title thirteen months later, and on April 1, 1924, The Royal Canadian Air Force became official.

== Uniform ==
The original uniform was a dark blue serge cut in army style with white shirts worn by officers. Army metal rank insignia and chevrons were worn but used Royal Air Force titles.

== Insignia ==
=== Cap and collars ===
There were 10 major varieties of metal insignia - six cap and four collar types. These types consisted of styles for officers and NCOs. For both cap and collar badges, the officers' issue consisted of a copper base overlaid with a copper maple leaf and silver wings. A silver "CAF" monogram overlaid the maple leaf and was attached to the copper base. Except for the silver CAF overlay, the NCO issue was cast as a single component in silver gilded metal. A feature of all officers' badges is red woven silk in the crown.

Cap and collars were issued with or without the motto (Sic Itur Ad Astra). The initial issue of these badges, designed and available in late 1918 or early 1919, was without the motto. In early 1920, dress regulations were revised and the insignia began incorporating the motto into a scroll at the bottom of both cap and collar badges.

The collar insignia mirror the construction of the cap badges (with or without motto). Cap badges were designed for either the wedge (field service) cap or the peaked cap for service dress. The first issue (type 1) for both officers' and NCO's cap badges (without motto) had a crown that was mounted to the top of the maple leaf at a single point. The second issue (type 2) for the smaller wedge/field cap for both officers and NCOs had the crown attached to the wings for additional support. For the larger peaked cap versions, the crown was again attached at one point and attached to the back copper plate. All officers' cap and collar insignia were initially backed in black felt. Cap badges were fastened with double loops which were held in place with a cotter pin. Officers' models for the peaked cap used a brass metal support strip under the crown wire to strengthen the badge and to keep it flush against the cap. Both 1st and 2nd issue officer's collars had a single screw post to fasten onto the uniform, whereas the NCO versions were manufactured with double loops.

=== Pilot's wings ===
First authorized and issued in late 1918 or early 1919, this pilots' double wing was made in a style similar to the officer's cap and collar badges. It consisted of a copper back with overlays of two silver wings with a silver "CAF" monogram superimposed over a copper maple leaf. Black felt covered the back and a brass metal support strip was added under the fasteners. The design of the wings made the structure fragile.

While there appears to be two die sets of the most common version of these wings, an uncommon and distinct variety has drooped wings relative to the central portion. Some versions are marked with the name of the manufacturer, "CaronBros" on one wing tip of the back copper plate.

Two examples are illustrated, neither with any maker marks, and both 2nd issue from the collection of AVM A.E. Godfrey during his tenure with the CAF. He had one set gold- and silver-plated, probably to be worn on a dress uniform at the time.

A replica set of several of the early 1920s insignia patterns were manufactured in 1967. The strike quality does not match the originals, but to the untrained eye, they can appear to have originated from the 1920s production. The pilots wing in this replica set retains the hallmark.

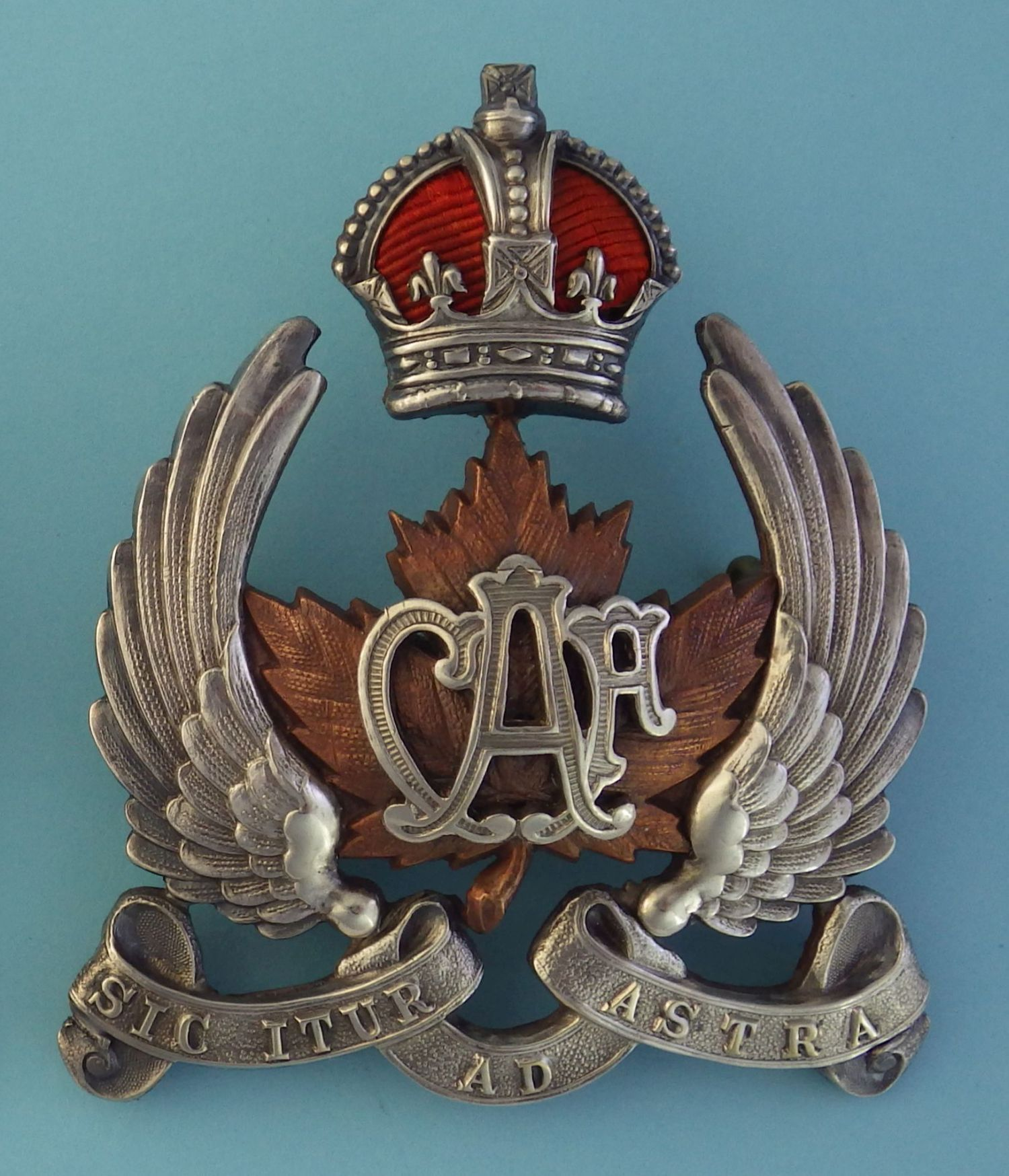
Officer's cap badge for the peaked service dress hat from the 2nd issue (with motto) c. 1920

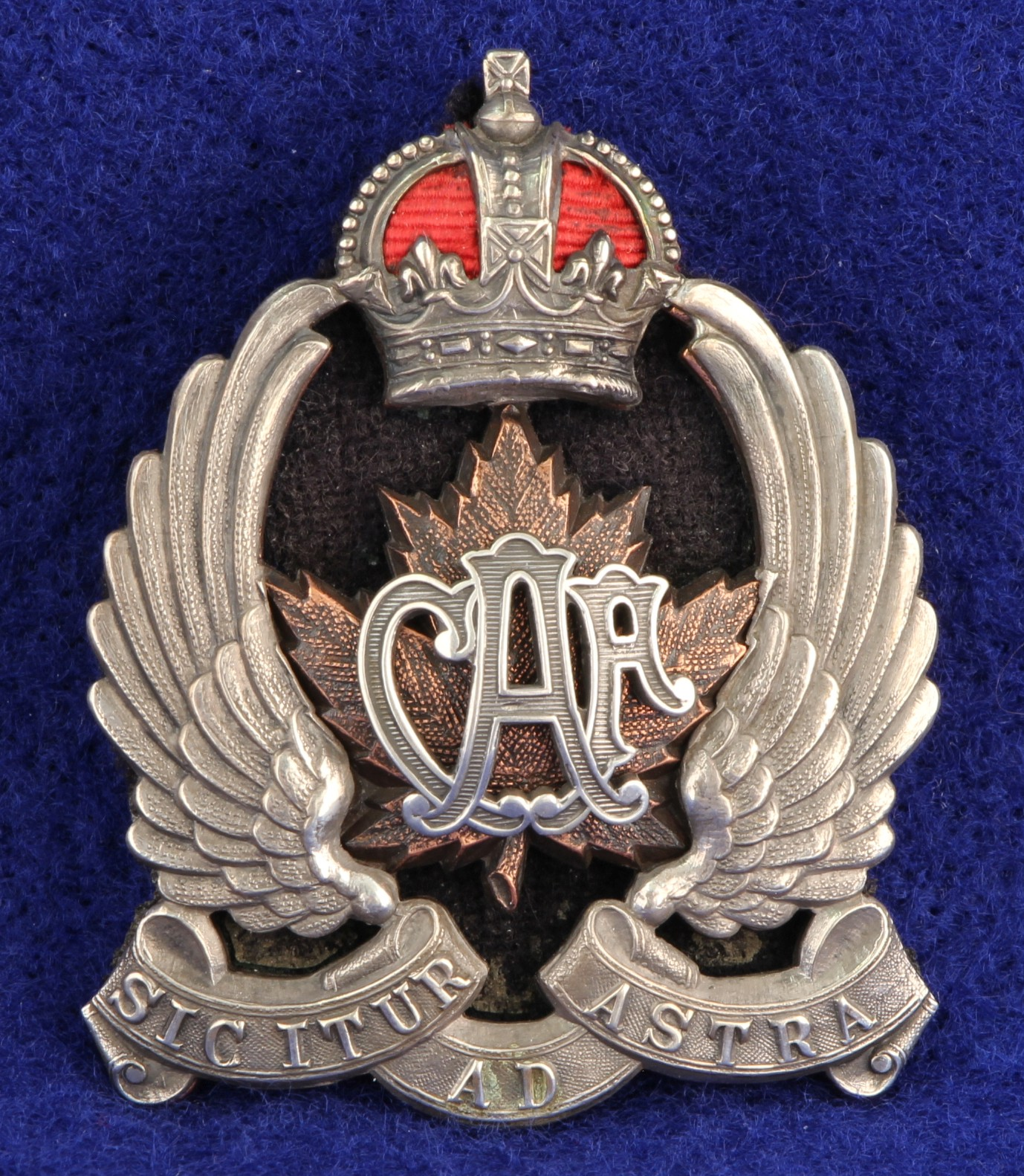
Officer's cap badge for the wedge hat from the 2nd issue (with motto) c. 1920

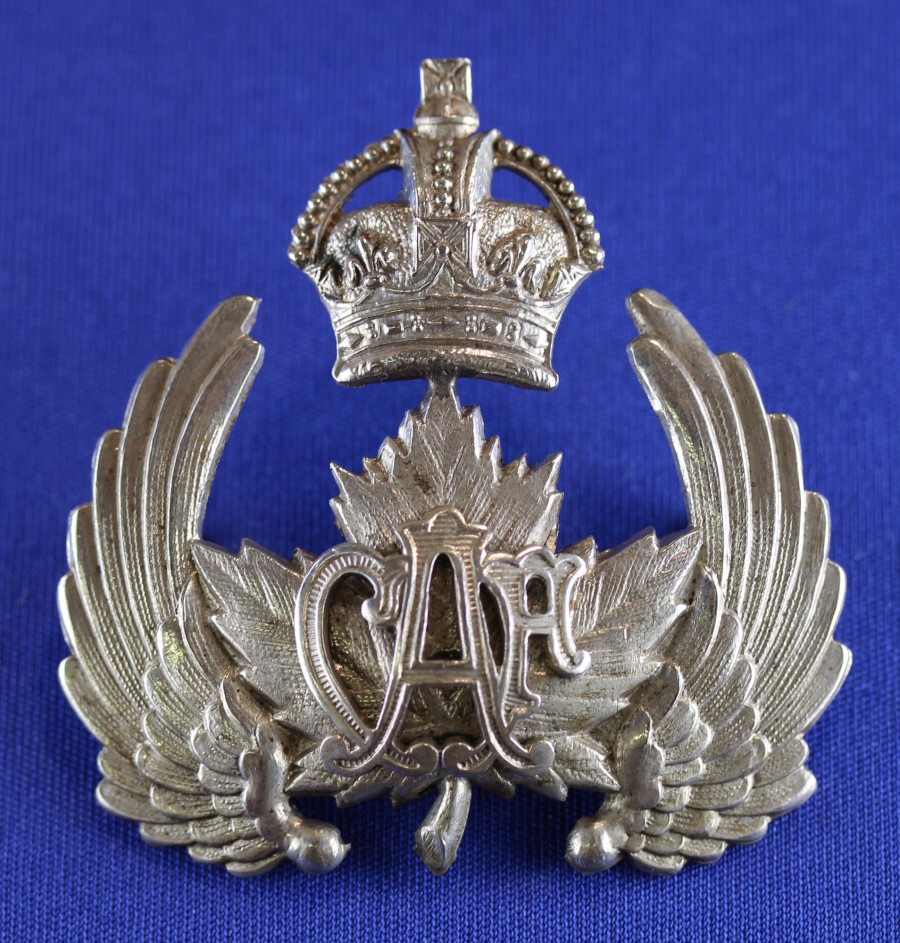
NCO's cap badge from the 1st issue (without motto) c. 1919

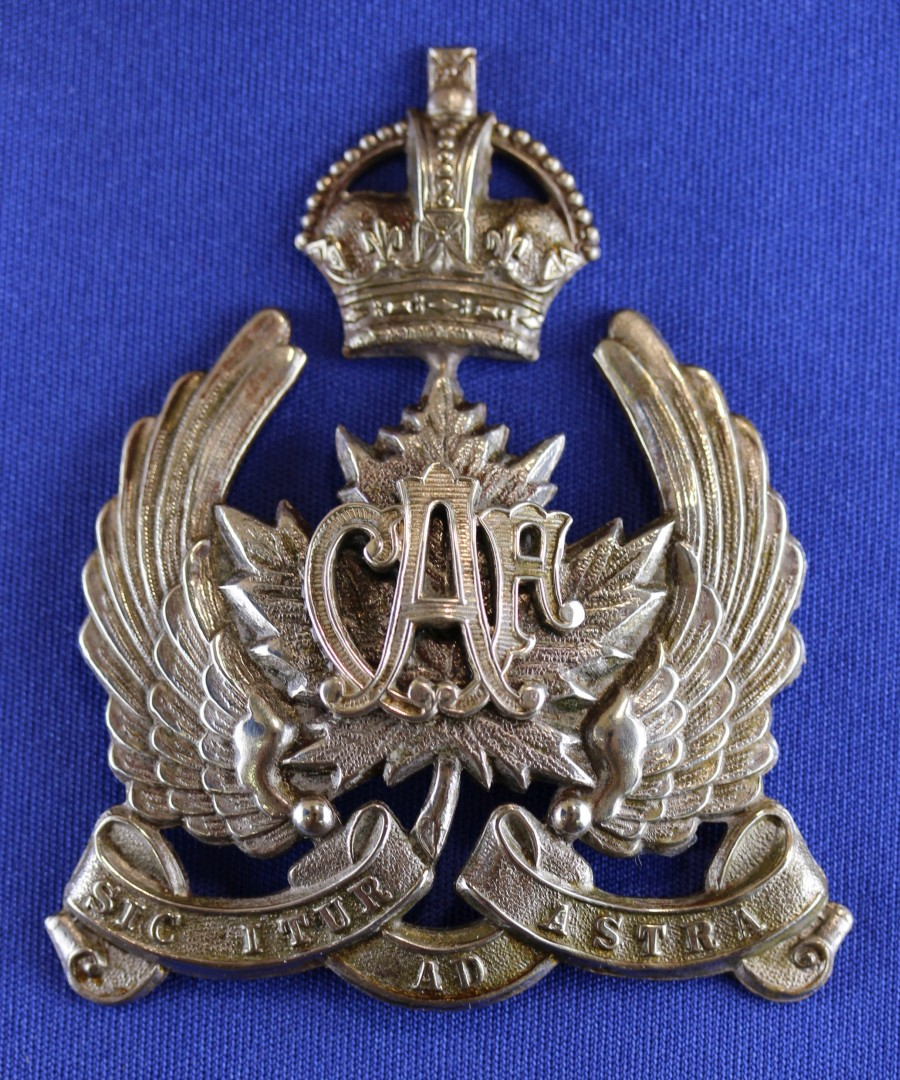
NCO's cap badge for the peaked service dress hat from the 2nd issue (with motto) c. 1920

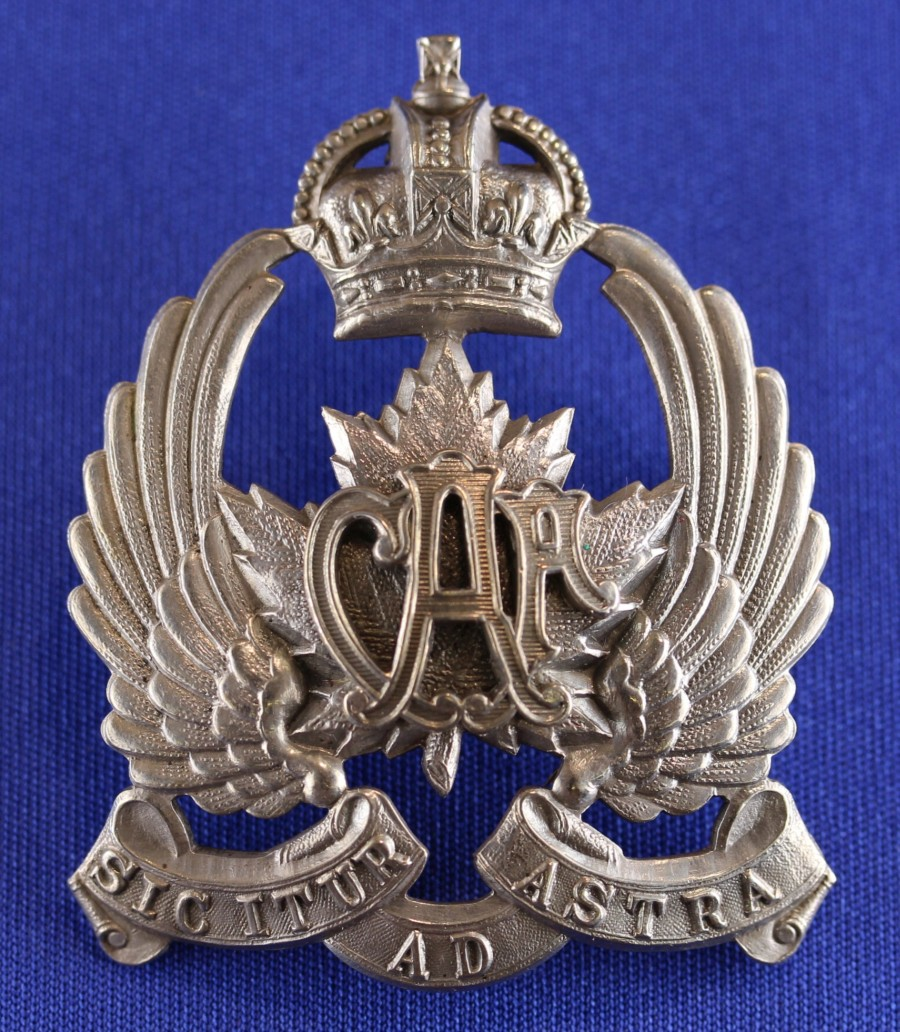
NCO's cap badge from the 2nd issue (with motto) c. 1920

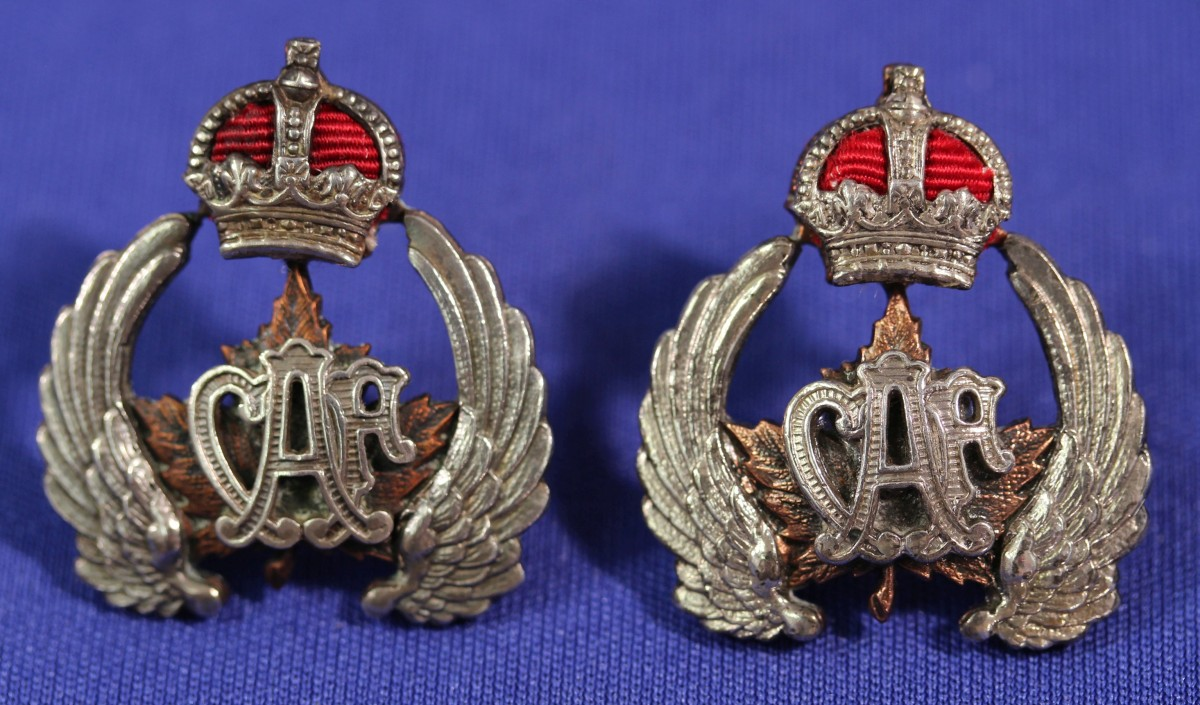
Set of officer's collar dogs from the 1st issue (without motto) c. 1919

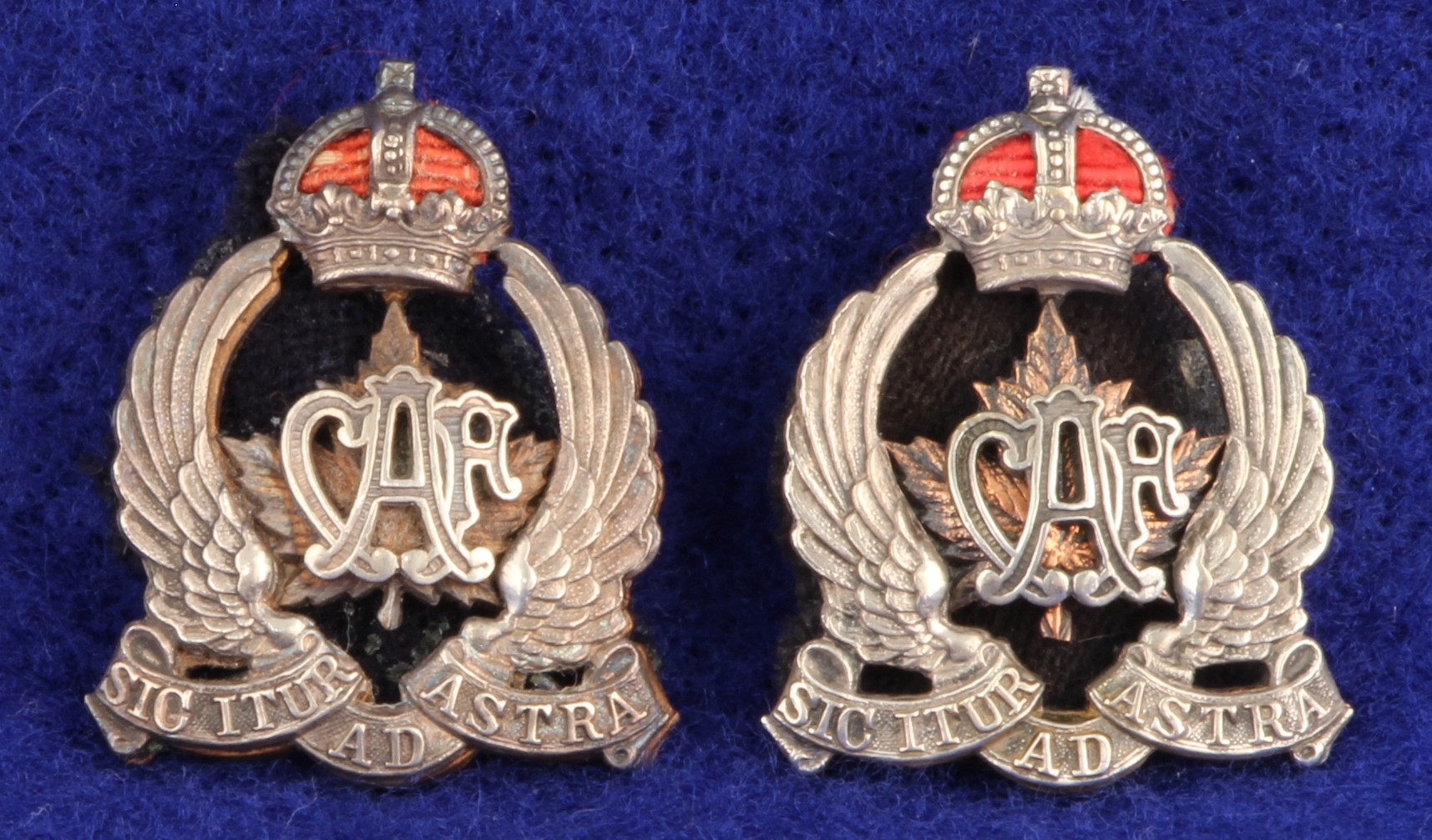
Set of officer's collar dogs from the 2nd issue (with motto) c. 1920

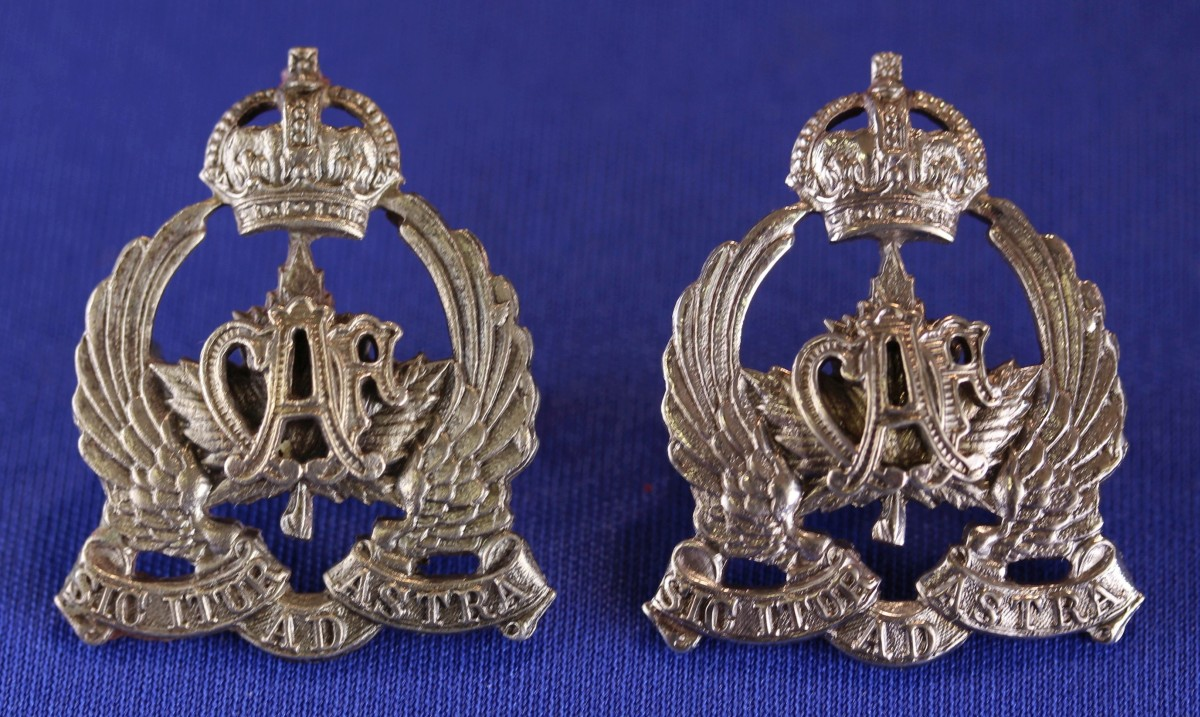
Set of NCO's collar dogs from the 2nd issue (with motto) c. 1920

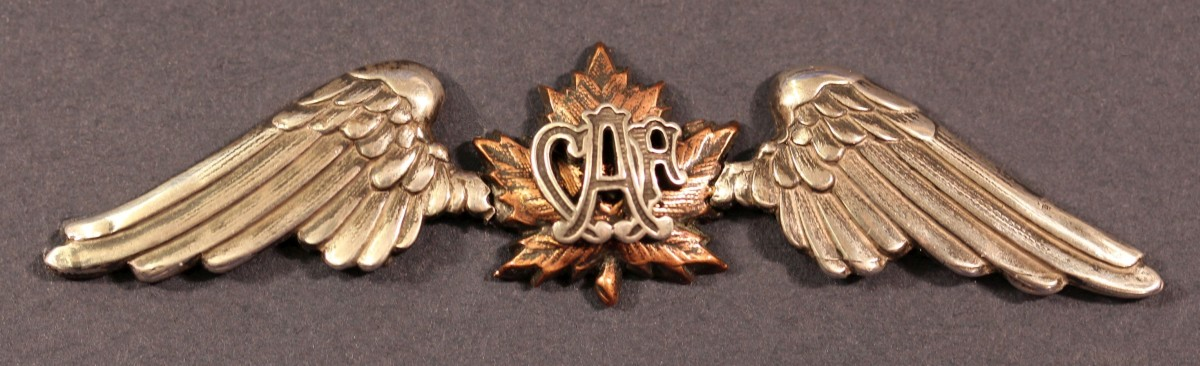
CAF pilot's wing, 2nd issue c. 1920 without hallmark

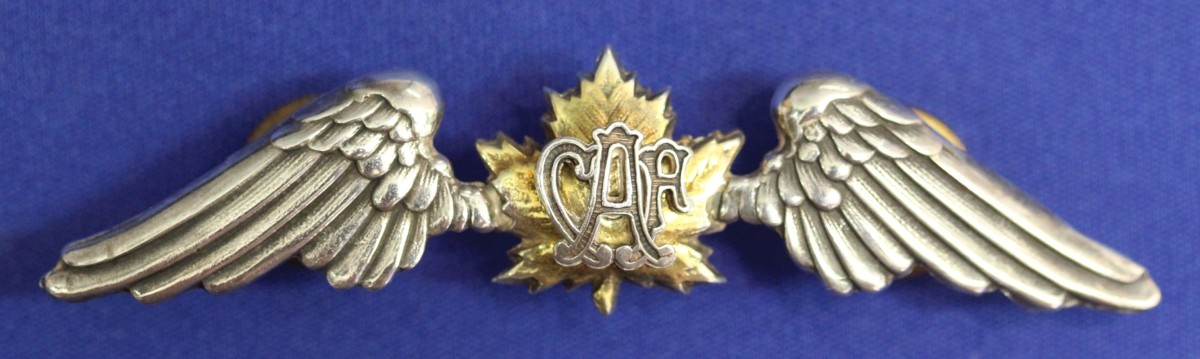
CAF pilot's wing, c. 1920, no hallmark on reverse. Custom gold and silver-plated by AVM A.E. Godfrey for his dress uniform

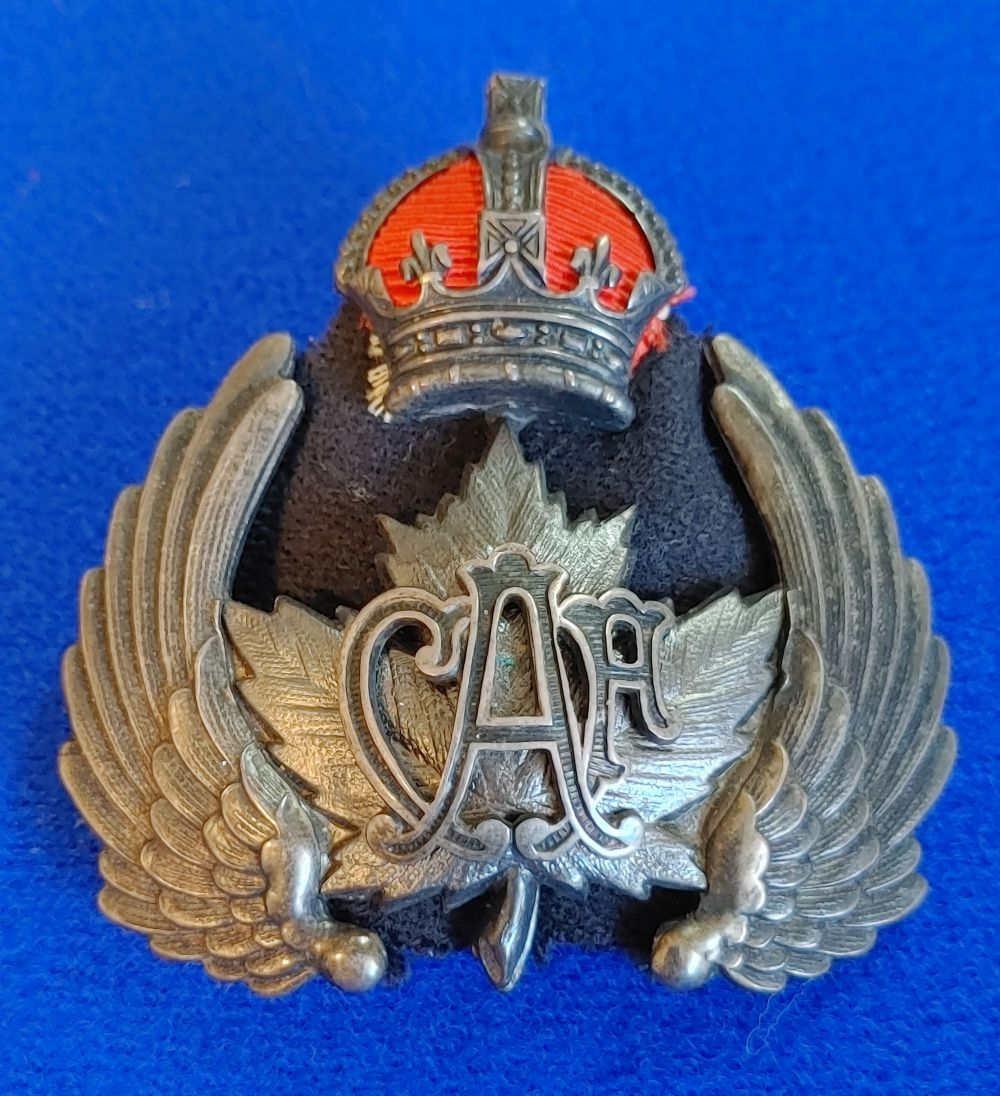
CAF Type 1 (1st issue) for Officer's caps, Height 55mm

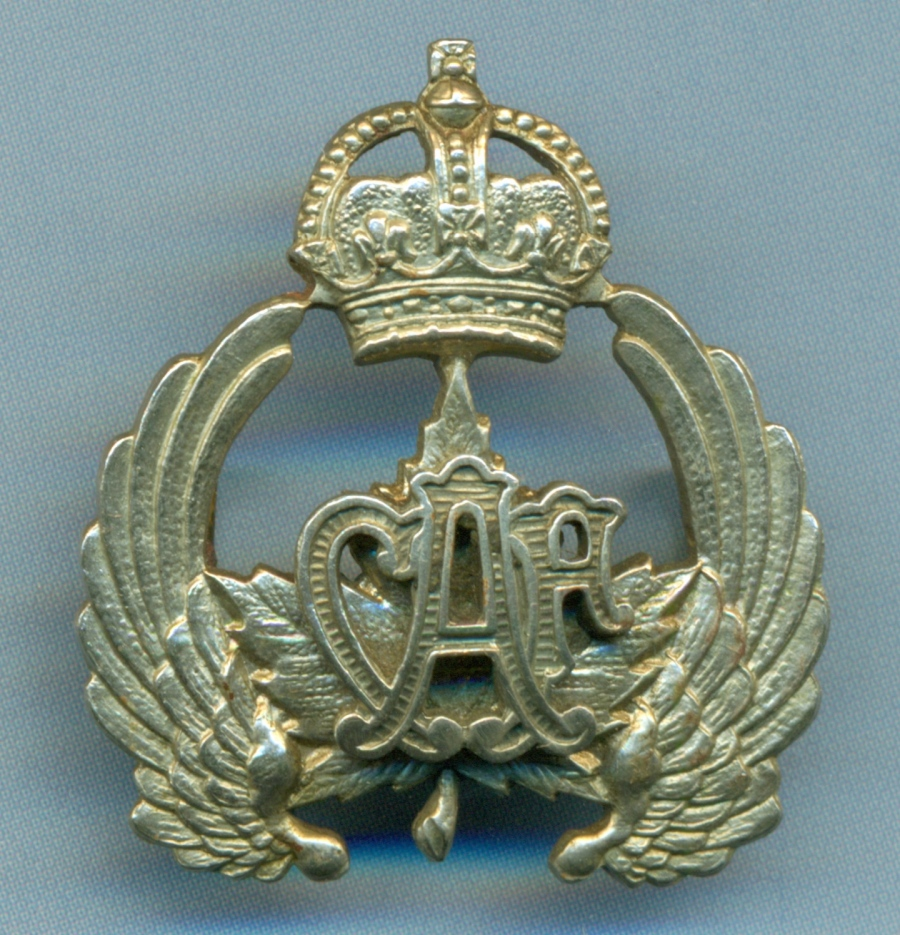
CAF Type 1 enlisted collar, loop fasteners

== Heads of the Canadian Air Force ==
The following officers served as heads of the Canadian Air Force from 1920 to 1924:

- 1920–1921: Air Commodore A. K. Tylee (as Air Officer Commanding)
- 1921: Wing Commander R. F. Redpath (as Officer Commanding)
- 1921–1922: Wing Commander J. S. Scott (as Officer Commanding)
- 1922–1924: Wing Commander J. L. Gordon (as Director)
