= William George Barker =

Canadian WWI fighter ace

Billy Barker VC DSO & Bar MC & Two Bars
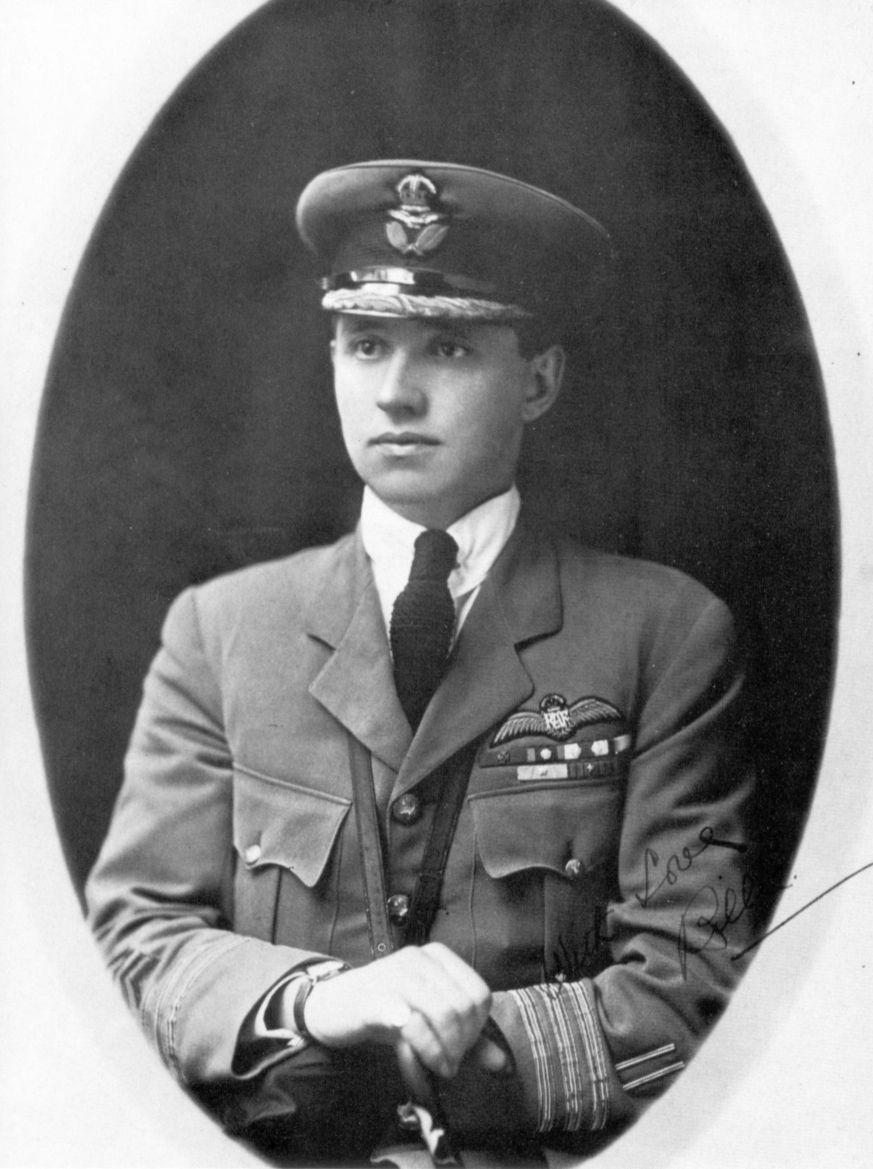
- Born: William George Barker; 3 November 1894; Dauphin, Manitoba, Canada
- Died: 12 March 1930 (aged 35); Ottawa, Ontario, Canada
- Military career
- Allegiance: Canada; United Kingdom
- Branch: Canadian Expeditionary Force (1914–16); Royal Flying Corps (1916–19); Royal Canadian Air Force (1922–30)
- Service years: 1914–1919; 1922–1930
- Rank: Wing Commander
- Units: No. 28 Squadron RAF; No. 66 Squadron RAF; No. 201 Squadron RAF
- Commands: No. 139 Squadron RAF
- Conflicts: First World War: Western Front; Battle of the Somme; Hundred Days Offensive (WIA); Italian Front
- Awards: Victoria Cross; Distinguished Service Order & Bar; Military Cross & Two Bars; Mentioned in Despatches (3); Croix de guerre (France); Silver Medal of Military Valor (2, Italy)
- Other work: President Fairchild Aircraft of Canada Limited

William George Barker, VC, DSO & Bar, MC & Two Bars (3 November 1894 – 12 March 1930) was a Canadian First World War fighter ace and Victoria Cross recipient. He is the most decorated serviceman in the history of Canada.

== Early life ==
Born on a family farm in Dauphin, Manitoba, "Will" Barker grew up on the frontier of the Great Plains, riding horses, shooting, and working as a youngster on his father's farm and sawmill. He was an exceptional shot, using a lever-action Winchester that he had modified with his own iron sight. He was particularly adept at shooting on the move, even while on horseback. One biographer has suggested that he could have been a trick shooter in a circus. He was physically poised, emotionally intense, with wide-ranging interests, and had an innate flair for the dramatic act. He was a very good student in school, but had frequent absences due to farm and sawmill life; he was the hunter providing food for the workers in the sawmill while still a young teenager, and missed classes because of this obligation. Barker was a Boy Scout at Russell, Manitoba, and a member of the 32nd Light Horse, a Non-Permanent Active Militia unit based at Roblin, Manitoba. He was in Grade 11 at Dauphin Collegiate Institute in the fall of 1914, just before his enlistment.

== First World War ==
In December 1914, soon after the outbreak of the First World War and the subsequent call to arms in the Dominion of Canada, Barker enlisted as No 106074 Trooper William G. Barker in the 1st Canadian Mounted Rifles. The regiment went to England in June 1915 and then to France on 22 September of that year. Barker was a Colt machine gunner with the regiment's machine gun section until late February or early March 1916, when he transferred as a probationary observer to 9 Squadron of the Royal Flying Corps, flying in Royal Aircraft Factory B.E.2 aircraft.

=== Western Front 1916–1917 ===
He was commissioned as a second lieutenant in April and was given five days' leave in London to acquire an officer's uniform and equipment. On his return, he was assigned to 4 Squadron and on 7 July transferred to 15 Squadron, still flying in the B.E.2. On 21 July Barker claimed a Roland scout "driven down" with his observer's gun, and in August claimed a second Roland, this time in flames. He was mentioned in despatches around this time. He officially qualified as an Observer on 27 August, and on 15 September he worked for the first time with Canadian troops, including his old regiment. On 15 November, Barker and his pilot, flying very low over the Ancre River, spotted a large concentration of German troops massing for a counter-attack on Beaumont Hamel. The crew sent an emergency Zone Call which brought to bear all available artillery fire in the area onto the specified target. The force of some 4,000 German infantry was effectively broken up. He was awarded the Military Cross (MC) for this action in the concluding stages of the Battle of the Somme.

In January 1917, after spending Christmas on leave in London, he commenced pilot training at Netheravon, Wiltshire, flying solo after 55 minutes of dual instruction. On 24 February 1917, he returned to serve a second tour on Corps Co-operation machines as a pilot flying B.E.2s and R.E.8s with 15 Squadron. On 25 March, Barker claimed another scout "driven down". On 25 April 1917 during the Arras Offensive, Barker, flying an R.E.8 with observer Lt. Goodfellow, spotted over 1,000 German troops sheltering in support trenches. The duo directed artillery fire into the positions, thereby avoiding a counter-attack.

After being awarded a bar to his MC in July, Barker was wounded in the head by anti-aircraft fire in August 1917. After a short spell in the UK as an instructor, Barker's continual requests for front-line service resulted in him being transferred to become a scout pilot, being offered a post with either 56 Squadron or 28 Squadron. He chose command of C Flight in the newly formed 28 Squadron, flying the Sopwith Camel that he preferred over the S.E.5s of 56 Squadron. Although Barker was reportedly not a highly skilled pilot – suffering several flying accidents during his career – he compensated for this deficiency with aggressiveness in action and highly accurate marksmanship.

The unit moved to France on 8 October 1917. Barker downed an Albatros D.V on his first patrol, though he did not claim it as the patrol was unofficial. He claimed an Albatros of Jasta 2 (Lt. Lange, killed) on 20 October, and two more, of Jasta 18, on 27 October (Lt. Schober killed, Offstv. Klein, force landed).

=== Italian Front 1917–1918 ===
On 7 November 1917, 28 Squadron was transferred to Italy with Barker temporarily in command; most of the unit, including aircraft, travelled by train to Milan. On 29 November he downed an Austrian Albatros D.III flown by Lt. Haertl of Jasta 1 near Pieve di Soligo. A Jasta 39 pilot was shot down and killed and a balloon of BK 10 was destroyed on 3 December.

One of his most successful, and also most controversial raids – fictionalized by Ernest Hemingway in the short story "The Snows of Kilimanjaro" – was on 25 December 1917. Catching the Germans off guard, he and Lt. Harold B. Hudson, his wingman, shot up the airfield of Fliegerabteilung (A) 204, setting fire to one hangar and damaging four German aircraft before dropping a placard wishing their opponents a "Happy Christmas."

Lt. Lang of Jasta 1 was killed by Barker on 1 January 1918, and two balloons, two Albatros fighters (one flown by Feldwebel Karl Semmelrock of Flik 51J) and a pair of two-seaters fell to Barker during February. Awarded the Distinguished Service Order (DSO) in March, he also claimed three more Albatroses and an observation balloon.

Owing to his tendency to ignore orders by flying many unofficial patrols, Barker was passed over when the post of Commanding Officer of 28 Squadron became vacant. Dissatisfied, he applied for a posting and joined 66 Squadron in April 1918, where he claimed a further 16 victories by mid-July.

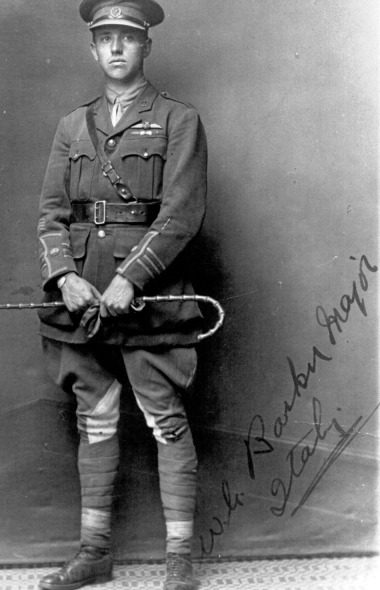
Barker in July 1918, shortly after he took command of No. 139 Squadron RAF

On 17 April, he shot down Oblt. Gassner-Norden of Flik 41J, flying an Albatros D.III (OEF), over Vittorio. He then became Squadron Commander of 139 Squadron, flying the Bristol Fighter. Barker, however, took his Sopwith Camel with him and continued to fly fighter operations. He carried out an unusual sortie on the night of 9 August when he flew a Savoia-Pomilio SP.4 bomber to land a spy behind enemy lines.

By this time, his personal Sopwith Camel (serial no. B6313) had become the most successful fighter aircraft in the history of the RAF, Barker having used it to shoot down 46 aircraft and balloons from September 1917 to September 1918, for a total of 404 operational flying hours. It was dismantled in October 1918, Barker keeping the clock as a memento, although he was asked to return it the following day. During this time, Barker trialled a series of modifications to B6313, to improve its combat performance. The Clerget rotary engine's cooling efficiency was poorer in the hotter Italian climate, so several supplementary cooling slots were cut into the cowling. The poor upward visibility of the Camel resulted in Barker cutting away progressively larger portions of the centre-section fabric. He also had a rifle-type, notch and bead gun-sight arrangement to replace the standard gunsight fitting.

Having flown more than 900 combat hours in two and a half years, Barker was transferred back to the UK in September 1918 to command the fighter training school at Hounslow Heath Aerodrome. Barker ended his Italian service with some 33 aircraft claimed destroyed and nine observation balloons downed, individually or with other pilots.

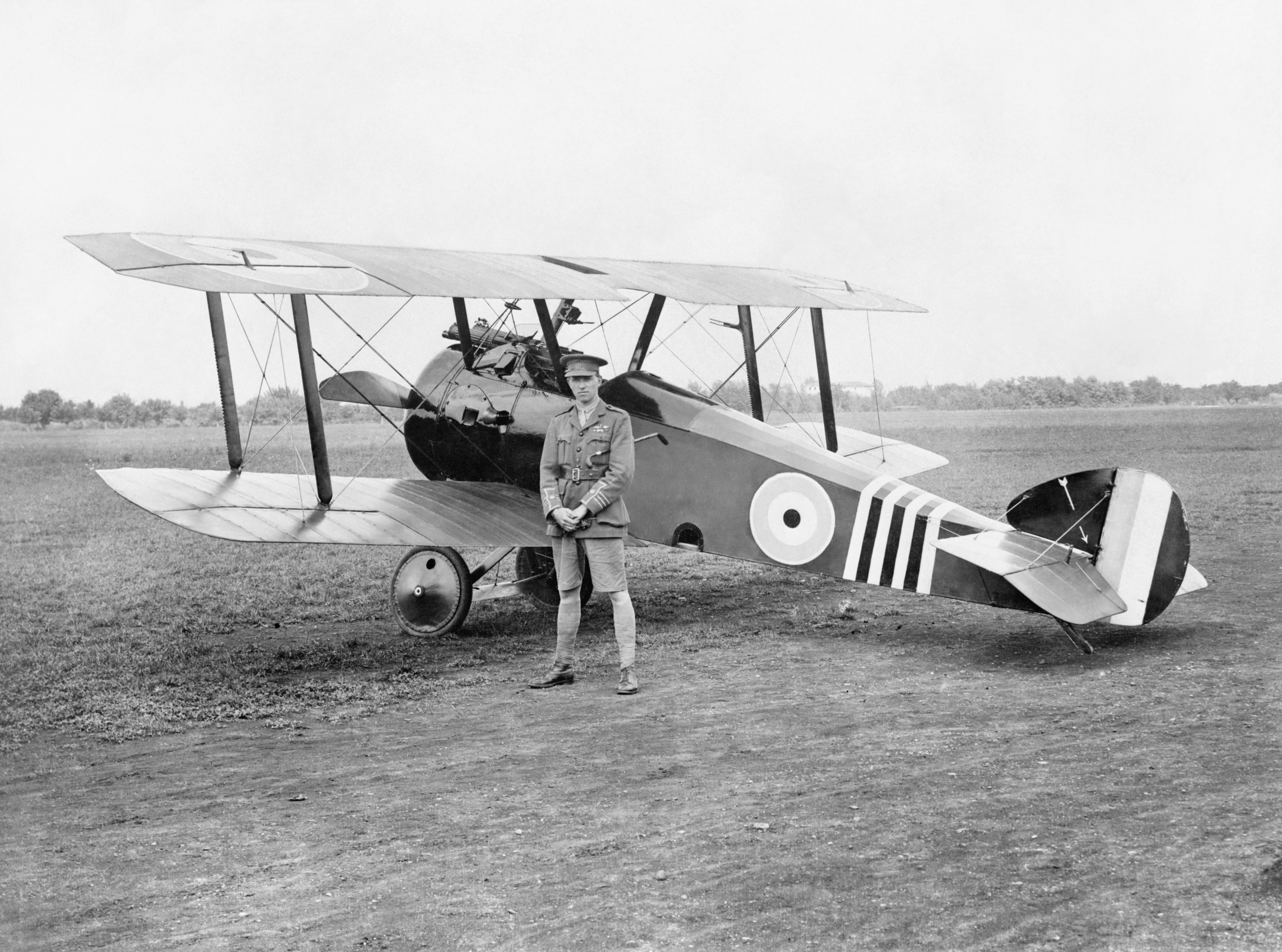
Barker stands next to his Sopwith Camel, 1918. He preferred flying the Camel over the standard aircraft flown by his squadron.

=== Victoria Cross ===
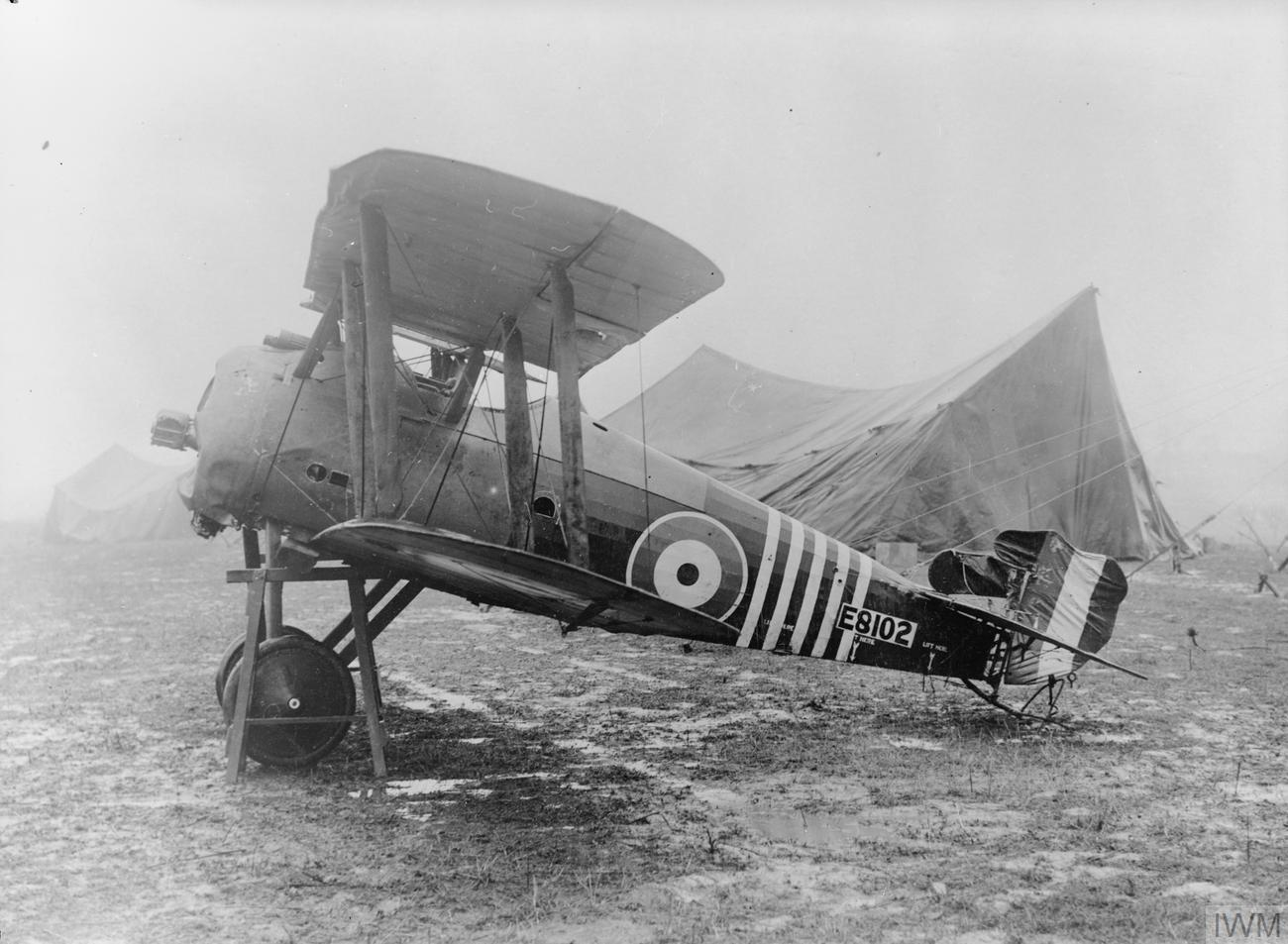
Barker's Snipe

In London at RAF HQ, he persuaded his superiors he needed to get up to date on the latest combat techniques in France and he was granted a 10-day roving commission in France. He selected the Sopwith Snipe as his personal machine and attached himself to No. 201 Squadron RAF, whose commander, Major Cyril Leman, was a friend from his days as a Corps Co-operation airman. He was awarded the Victoria Cross for his actions on Sunday, 27 October 1918, day 10 of his roving commission.

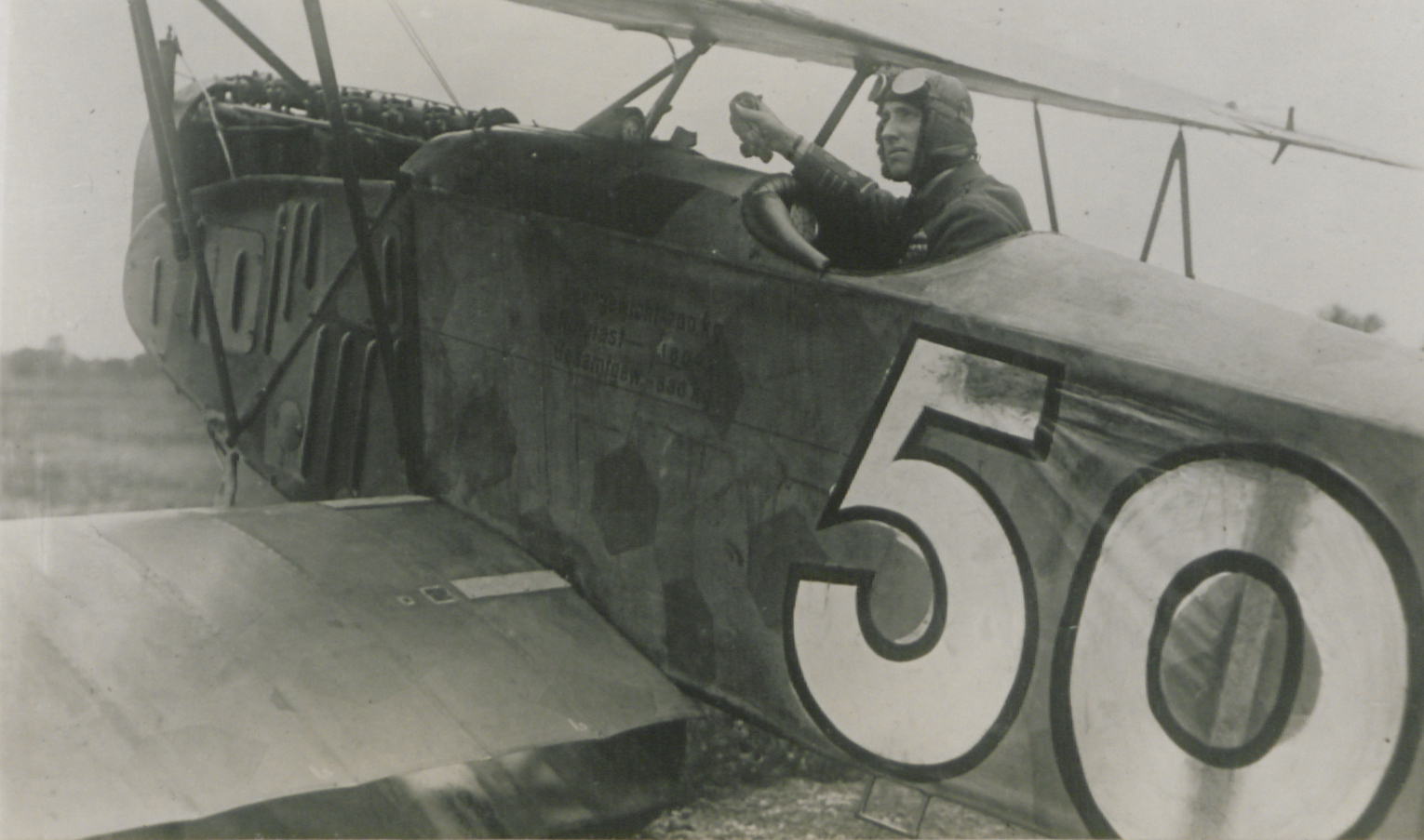
Col Barker, VC, in 1919, in a captured German aeroplane (HS85-10-36752), one of those against which he fought his last air battle

While returning his Snipe to an aircraft depot, he crossed enemy lines at 21,000 feet above the Forêt de Mormal. He attacked an enemy Rumpler two-seater which broke up, its crew escaping by parachute (the aircraft was of FAA 227, Observer Lt. Oskar Wattenburg killed). By his own admission, he was careless and was bounced by a formation of Fokker D.VIIs of Jagdgruppe 12, consisting of Jasta 24 and Jasta 44, in a descending battle against 15 or more enemy machines. The dogfight took place immediately above the lines of the Canadian Corps. Severely wounded and bleeding profusely, Barker force-landed inside Allied lines, his life being saved by the men of an RAF Kite Balloon Section who transported him to a field dressing station. The fuselage of his Snipe aircraft was recovered from the battlefield and is preserved at the Canadian War Museum, Ottawa, Ontario. He is credited with shooting down the Rumpler and three Fokker DVIIs; German reports acknowledge a casualty: "27/10/18 Jasta 44 Ltn. Hinky is WIA and to hospital". A possible related casualty was Jasta 24 Vfw Schymik, killed in action, while Barker may have been shot down by Js 24's Ostv Friedrich Altemeier.

At a hospital in Rouen, France, Barker clung to life until mid-January 1919, and then was transported back to England. He was not fit enough to walk the necessary few paces for the VC investiture at Buckingham Palace until 1 March 1919.

Barker is officially credited with one captured, two (and seven shared) balloons destroyed, 33 (and two shared) aircraft destroyed, and five aircraft "out of control", the highest "destroyed" tally for any RAF, RFC, or RNAS pilot during the conflict. The Overseas Military Forces of Canada recognized Barker as "holding the record for fighting decorations" awarded in the First World War.

=== Most decorated hero ===
Barker returned to Canada in May 1919 as the most decorated Canadian of the war, with the Victoria Cross, the Distinguished Service Order and Bar, the Military Cross and two Bars, two Italian Silver Medals for Military Valour, and the French Croix de guerre. He was also mentioned in despatches three times. The Canadian Daily Record, a publication of the Overseas Military Forces of Canada, wrote in December 1918 that William Barker of Dauphin, Manitoba was the Canadian holding the record for "most fighting decorations" in the war. No other Canadian soldier, sailor or airman has surpassed this record, and the Canadian War Museum exhibit, located in Ottawa, Ontario, states: "Lieutenant Colonel William G. Barker, one of the legendary aces of the war, remains the most decorated Canadian in military service". A plaque on his tomb in the mausoleum of Toronto's Mount Pleasant Cemetery, officially unveiled on 22 September 2011, describes him as "The most decorated war hero in the history of Canada, the British Empire, and the Commonwealth of Nations". Only two other servicemen in the history of the Commonwealth or Empire have received as many British medals for gallantry. These were Mick Mannock and James McCudden and, like Barker, both were "scout pilots" in the First World War. Barker, Mannock, and McCudden each received six British medals, including the Victoria Cross. McCudden was also awarded a French Croix de Guerre. But with his three foreign medals and three mentions in despatches, Barker received a total of 12 awards for valour.

== Post-war ==
Barker formed a business partnership, Bishop-Barker Aeroplanes Limited, with fellow Victoria Cross recipient and Canadian ace Billy Bishop which lasted for about three years. In 1922 he rejoined the fledgling Canadian Air Force in the rank of Wing Commander, serving as the Station Commander of Camp Borden from 1922 to 1924.

Barker was appointed acting director of the RCAF in early 1924 and he graduated from RAF Staff College, Andover, England, in 1926. While waiting to start RAF Staff College Course No 4, Barker spent two weeks in Iraq with the RAF to learn more about the uses of airpower. He formally reported on his findings to the Minister of National Defence, and informally to Brigadier General Billy Mitchell, of the US Air Service. One of his achievements in the RCAF was the introduction of parachutes. After leaving the RCAF he became the first president of the Toronto Maple Leafs hockey club and was involved in tobacco-growing farms in southwestern Ontario.

Barker continued to suffer from the physical effects of his 1918 gunshot wounds: his legs were permanently damaged and he suffered severely limited movement in his left arm.

He died in 1930 when he lost control of his Fairchild KR-21 biplane trainer during a demonstration flight for the RCAF, at Air Station Rockcliffe, near Ottawa, Ontario. He was aged 35. At the time, he was the president and general manager of Fairchild Aircraft in Montreal.

== Legacy ==
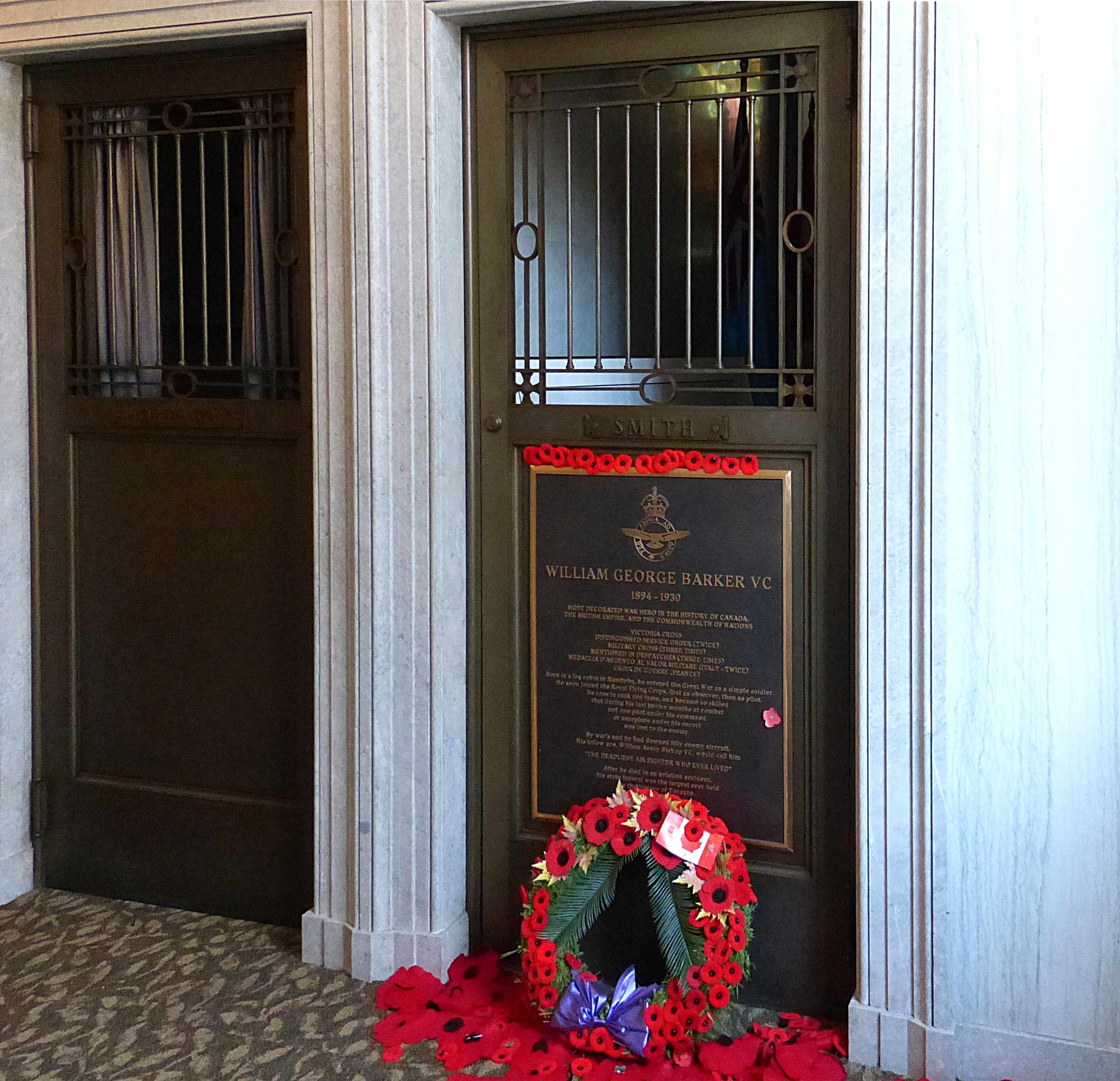
Barker's tomb is located inside his wife's family crypt in the Mausoleum at Mount Pleasant Cemetery in Toronto

His funeral, the largest national state event in Toronto's history, was attended by an honour guard of 2,000 soldiers. The cortège stretched for more than a mile and a half, and it included the Chief of the General Staff and his senior officers, the Lieutenant Governor of Ontario, the Mayor of Toronto, three federal government cabinet ministers, and six other Victoria Cross recipients. An honour guard was also provided by the United States Army. Some 50,000 spectators lined the streets of Toronto en route to Mount Pleasant Cemetery, where Barker was entombed in his wife's family crypt at the Mausoleum.

On 6 June 1931, an airfield in Toronto was renamed Barker Field in his memory. At CFB Borden in Ontario, an elementary school was named after Barker before its closure in the mid-1990s.

In his hometown of Dauphin, Manitoba, an elementary school and the Barker Airport (dedicated in 1998) are named in his honour. The Dauphin squadron of the Royal Canadian Air Cadets is named for Barker.

During the week of 8 January 1999, the Canadian federal government designated Barker a person of national historic significance. The Discovery Channel's Flightpath series, a television documentary, included an episode entitled "First of the Few", a biography of Barker, which was broadcast on 27 April 1999 in Canada. In 2003, History TV broadcast "The Hero's Hero – The Forgotten Life of William Barker."

Barker's only daughter, Jean Antoinette Mackenzie (née Barker), died in July 2007. A memorial at Mount Pleasant Cemetery in Toronto was unveiled on 22 September 2011 to mark Barker as the "most decorated war hero in the history of Canada, the British Empire, and the Commonwealth of Nations." In 2012, Southport Aerospace Centre named its new flight student accommodation building after him. In 2015 a statue of Barker and William "Billy" Bishop called "The First Meeting" was installed at Toronto's Billy Bishop Airport.

In October 2021, it was announced that the UK's seventh Poseidon MRA1 maritime patrol aircraft would be known as William Barker VC. In September 2024 the LCol William G. Barker, VC Park was opened in Ottawa. On 4 November 2026 a new bronze statue of Barker was unveiled in Toronto at Scrivener Square Park.

Military offices
Unknown	Station Commander Camp Borden; 1922–1924	Unknown
Preceded by Lindsay Gordon	Director of the RCAF; April–May 1924	Succeeded by James Stanley Scott
