= RCAF Station High River =

Former air station in High River, Alberta, Canada

- High River, Alberta, Canada; Near High River, Alberta in Canada
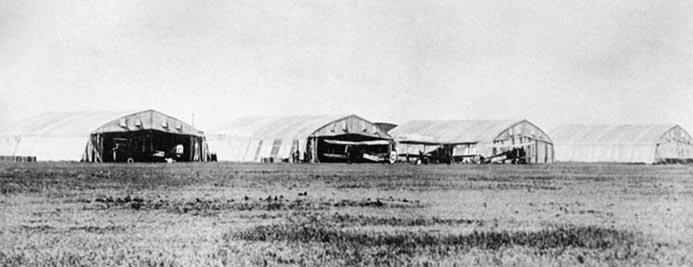
- DH4 aircraft at the High River Air Station, 1922

Site information
- Owner: Dept of National Defence (Canada)

Location
- Location within Alberta
- Coordinates: 50°35′35″N 113°50′30″W

Site history
- In use: 1921–1944

Airfield information
- Elevation: 3,400 feet (1,036 m) AMSL
Runways
Direction	Length and surface
7/25	3,125 feet (952 m) turf
16/34	3,100 feet (945 m) turf
2/20	4,000 feet (1,219 m) turf

RCAF Station High River was a station of the Royal Canadian Air Force (RCAF) located at High River, Alberta, Canada. It is situated on the south side of 498 ave east.

== High River Air Station ==
The High River Air Station commenced flying operations on 6 May 1921 when the Flying Operations Branch of the Canadian Air Board relocated the Morley Air Station to High River over the winter of 1920–21. The Morley Air Station was one of the initial five stations established for civil operations in the summer of 1920. From experience gained during the 1920 flying season, the weather at Morley was determined to be too erratic and dangerous for flying. In the early days, the station had an entirely civil function and was the largest in Canada with ten war-surplus Airco DH.4 aircraft that were part of the Imperial Gift provided to Canada by Britain after the First World War. Initially, most of the flying operations consisted of fire-spotting forestry patrols over the mountains and foothills to the west. Two patrols were made daily, to the Clearwater, Bow and Crowsnest Forest Reserves. One patrol flew north as far as the Clearwater River, and one south to the International Boundary. Of the early Canadian air stations, High River was the most active, with 215 flights flown on forest patrols.

Other responsibilities of the station included aerial photography, parachute experimentation, aircraft testing, and aerial pesticide spraying. In the early 1920s the station became involved with experimenting with radio. Wireless equipment was developed in cooperation with the Canadian Corps of Signals to develop radio signals to be broadcast over distances greater than 300 km. The most powerful radio transmitter in North America began operating from the High River Air Station in 1922.

In 1922, sub-bases were established at Eckville and Pincher Creek at the northern and southern ends of the patrol routes. Patrols were flown outbound in each direction in the morning, refuelled at the sub-bases, and returned in the afternoon. Aerial photography operations were also begun in 1922, using modified DH.4 aircraft.

Following the cancellation of part-time training for military pilots on 31 March 1922, the Air Board restructured its flying operations, merging the Flying Operations Branch into the Canadian Air Force in June. Changes to the organization of the air stations were deferred to the fall to avoid administrative issues during the flying season. On 25 November 1922, the High River Air Station was renamed CAF Unit High River and the civilian personnel were commissioned or enlisted into the Canadian Air Force. The name changed again when the Canadian Air Force was granted the "Royal" prefix effective 13 March 1923, becoming RCAF Unit High River, then RCAF Station High River in early October. None of these changes, nor the official formation of the Royal Canadian Air Force on 1 April 1924, substantially altered the role of the station.

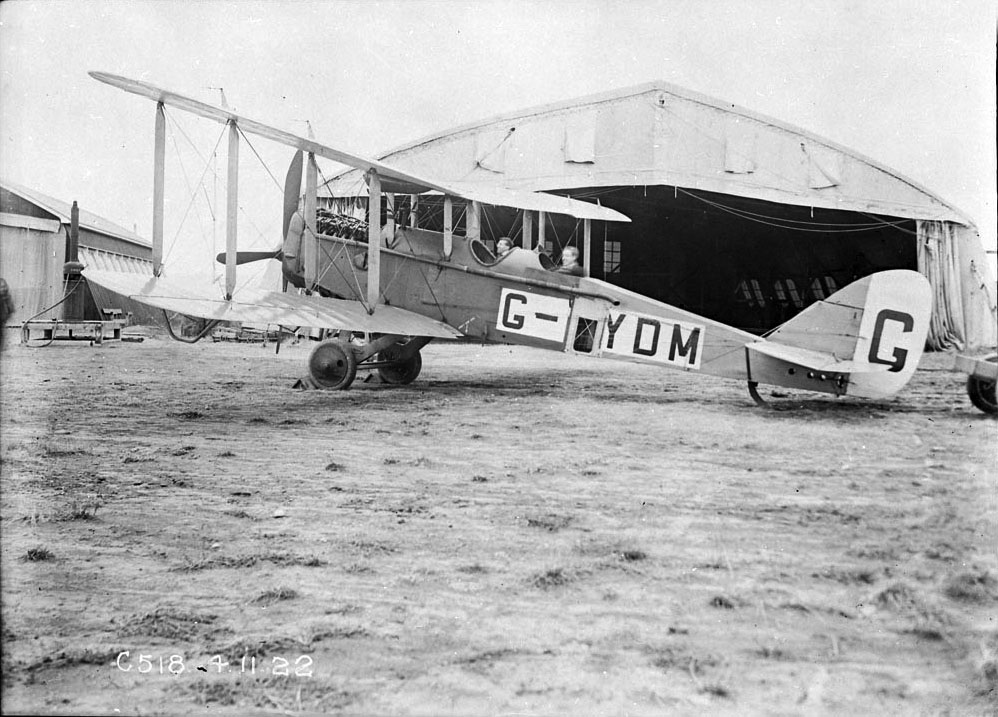
D.H. 4 aircraft G-CYDM of the Canadian Air Board, High River, Alberta, Canada, 4 November 1922

Late in 1924, five Avro 552 Vipers were delivered to replace the DH.4s on forestry patrol, with two of the latter type retained for the station's mobile photographic flight. In July 1925, retroactive to 1 April, all the RCAF's civil operations stations were re-designated as numbered squadrons, with High River becoming No. 2 (Operations) Squadron. The northern refueling field moved from Eckville to Rocky Mountain House in 1926, though Eckville was used again temporarily in 1927.

On 1 July 1927, the RCAF's civil operations were transferred to the new Directorate of Civil Government Air Operations, and No. 2 (Operations) Squadron again became the High River Air Station. This directorate was nominally civilian, the director reporting directly to the Deputy Minister of National Defence, but was still staffed almost entirely by attached or seconded RCAF personnel. The following year, all photographic operations were re-organized as independent detachments reporting directly to Ottawa, and High River provided support to No. 1 Photographic Detachment instead of fielding its own photographic flight. In 1928, De Havilland DH. 60 Cirrus Moths replaced both the DH.4s and the Avro 552s. That same year, a sub-station was established at Grande Prairie to enable the patrolling of the Peace River Country.

After jurisdiction for natural resource management was transferred to the Province of Alberta in 1930, fire towers were built and spotting aircraft were no longer necessary. Fire-spotting patrols gradually ceased. No. 1 Photographic Detachment moved to Vancouver for the 1930 flying season. Other activities such as aircraft testing continued until the station closed on 31 March 1931, with its facilities transferred to the Winnipeg Air Station for care and maintenance. The station did, however, remain as an aircraft storage facility until the beginning of the Second World War when the station was reactivated to train pilots for wartime service.

== No. 5 Elementary Flying Training School ==
RCAF Station High River was a major participant in British Commonwealth Air Training Plan aircrew training during the Second World War. No. 5 Elementary Flying Training School (EFTS) was established at High River on 28 June 1941 after having moved from RCAF Station Lethbridge because of wind problems at Lethbridge. Training was provided by civilian instructors from the Calgary Aero Club. De Havilland Tiger Moths were the first aircraft used. They were later replaced by Fairchild Cornells. An unprepared emergency and practice landing field, also known as a relief landing field, was located on the then dry lakebed of nearby Frank Lake. More than 4000 pilots were trained at No. 5 EFTS. The school closed on 15 December 1944.

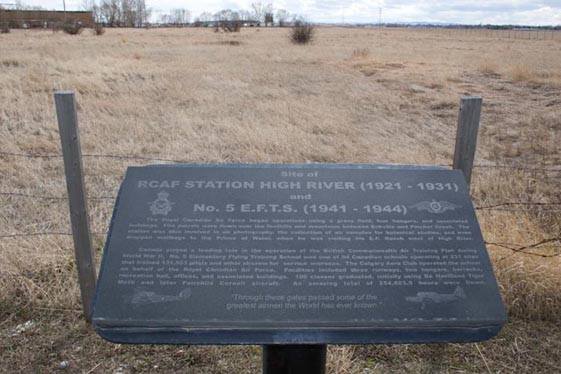
Site of RCAF Station High River. Remains of the main hangar can be seen in the upper left.

=== Aerodrome ===
In approximately 1942, the aerodrome was listed at 50°36′N 113°51′W with a Var. 23 degrees E and elevation of 3,400 feet (1,036 m). The field was listed as "Irregular all-way turf field" and had three runways listed as follows:

Runway name	Length	Width	Surface
7/25	3,100 feet (945 m)	1,000 feet (305 m)	Turf
8/26	3,100 feet (945 m)	1,000 feet (305 m)	Turf
14/32	4,000 feet (1,219 m)	1,000 feet (305 m)	Turf

=== Relief landing field - Frank Lake ===
In approximately 1942 the relief aerodrome was listed at 50°33′N 113°43′W with a Var. 23 degrees E and elevation of 3,295 feet (1,004 m). The field was listed as "Dry Lake Bed" and was located at Frank Lake, east of High River, and was marked as a square measuring:

- N-S - 2,640 feet (805 m)
- E-W - 2,640 feet (805 m)

== Closure to present ==
The High River aerodrome closed in December 1944. The site is no longer a functioning airport and the lone remaining hangar has been repurposed for commercial use. There also remains an underground shelter.
