= Royal Canadian Naval Air Service =

Royal Canadian Navy air service established in 1918

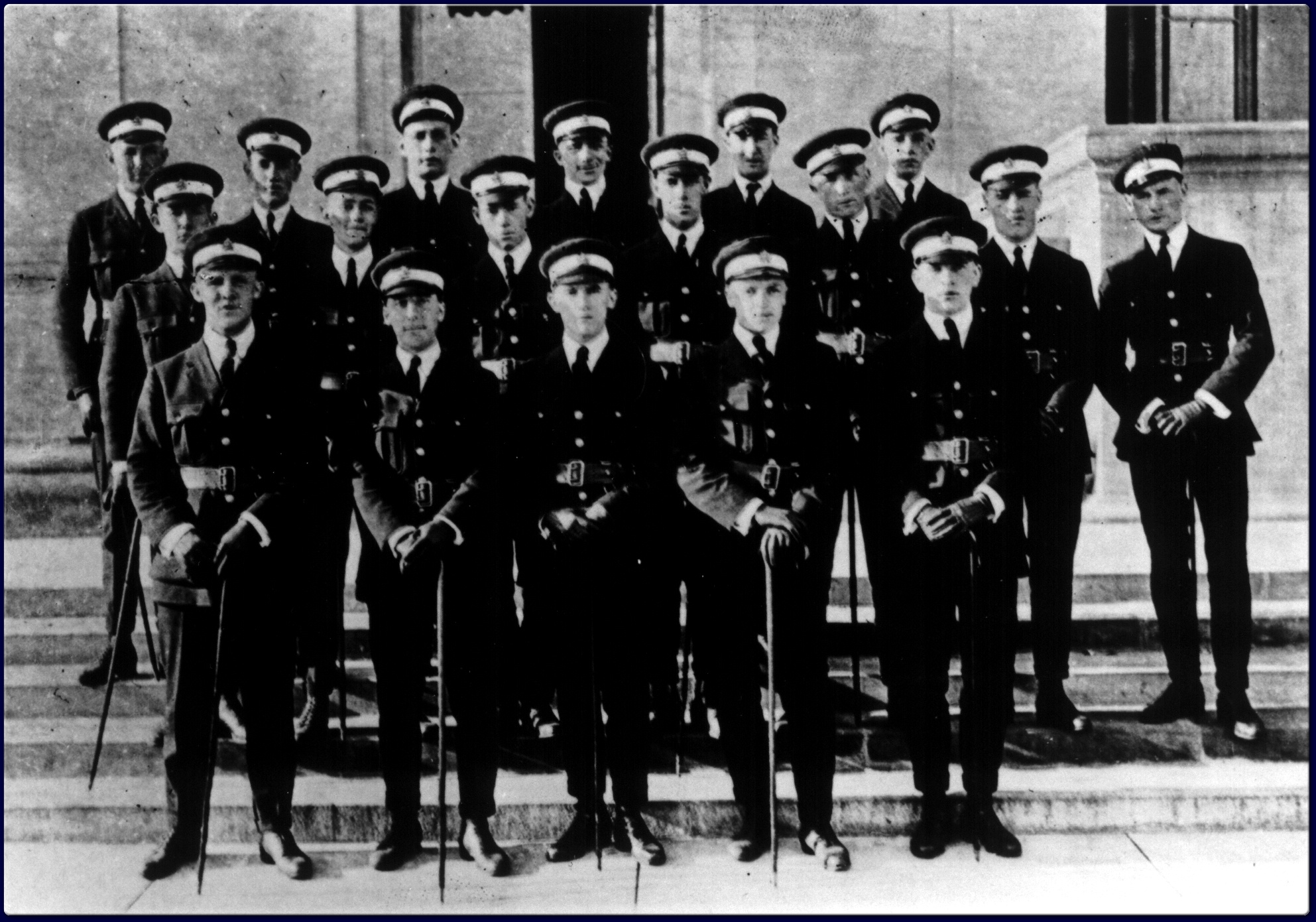
The first group of cadets of the Royal Canadian Naval Air Service being trained at the US Navy Ground School, Walker Hall, Massachusetts Institute of Technology, circa Sept 1918.

The Royal Canadian Naval Air Service (RCNAS) was established in 1918 during the First World War in response to a Royal Canadian Navy (RCN) recommendation that defensive air patrols be established off Canada's Atlantic coast to protect shipping from German U-boats.

Britain warned Canada that an attack by a new class of U-boat that could voyage across the Atlantic was possible. Although U-boats were few in number and not yet capable of posing a major threat in open ocean where ships were difficult to locate, they could be a threat near ports, bays or channels where ships would be certain to be grouped together. Aircraft had proven themselves in similar defensive situations such as convoys, where aircraft forced submarines to remain submerged. The United States already had aircraft and bases to defend its own shores, but it was concluded that additional stations in Canada would be needed.

The United States supplied aircraft and personnel while Canada recruited and trained its own aircrew and support personnel who were intended to replace the Americans. RCNAS aircrew were trained in the United States and the United Kingdom.

The United States Naval Flying Corps flew convoy escort missions and reconnaissance patrols from two air stations which were established in Nova Scotia near convoy assembly ports:

- Naval Air Station Halifax, Dartmouth, Nova Scotia
- Naval Air Station Sydney, North Sydney, Nova Scotia

Escorts were provided to ships leaving and entering port. No U-boats were ever located, however, although 110,000 tons of shipping were sunk in North American waters in the last two months of the war.

The war ended before the RCNAS aircrew had completed training and the RCNAS was disbanded. The Air Board took control of both stations. The Halifax station would remain in operation, while the North Sydney station was left inactive until the Second World War.

After the disbanding of the RCNAS, the RCN would not operate naval aircraft until World War II when they manned escort carriers HMS Nabob and HMS Puncher. Several Canadian Naval Air Service pilots were loaned to the Royal Navy and few from British aircraft carriers. Lieutenant Robert Hampton Gray was awarded the Victoria Cross for his action when he died just five days before the war ended. The RCN would independently operate aircraft until 1968, when its aviation operations were subsumed into the Canadian Armed Forces upon unification.

== See also ==
- History of the Royal Canadian Air Force
- History of the Royal Canadian Navy
- History of aviation in Canada
- Royal Naval Air Service
- Canadian Aviation Corps
- Canadian Air Force (1918–20)
- Royal Flying Corps Canada

== External link ==
- Canadian Encyclopedia
