= William Frederick Nelson Sharpe =

Canadian aviator

Lieutenant William Frederick Nelson Sharpe
- Born: 6 December 1892; Prescott, Ontario, Canada
- Died: 4 February 1915 (aged 22); Brighton, United Kingdom
- Military career
- Allegiance: Canada; United Kingdom
- Branch: Canadian Aviation Corps
- Service years: 1914–1915
- Conflicts: First World War: Western Front

Lieutenant William Frederick Nelson Sharpe (December 6, 1892, Prescott, Ontario – February 4, 1915, Brighton, England) - pilot. Sharpe later joined the Royal Flying Corps but was killed in a flying accident. He was the first Canadian pilot to die in World War I.

== Early ==
Frederick and Ida Bell (née Mills) Sharpe had a son, William Frederick Nelson Sharpe was born in Prescott, Ontario, on December 6, 1892. When he was a child he moved to Ottawa. As an adult, he had his flight instruction from the Curtiss Flying School in San Diego, California.

== Military career ==
Colonel Sam Hughes, Canada's Minister of Militia and Defence tried to create the Canadian Aviation Corps (CAC). Hughes appointed Ernest Lloyd Janney as provisional commander and authorized him to spend up to $5000 on an aircraft. A Burgess-Dunne floatplane was purchased in the United States, shipped to Vermont and then flown to Valcartier, Quebec where it was taken apart, crated, and shipped to England. Janney and the two other CAC members, William Frederick Nelson Sharpe, a pilot, and Staff Sergeant H. A. Farr, a mechanic, accompanied the aircraft. The aircraft was left abandoned and damaged on Salisbury Plain, having never flown any combat operations. By May 1915, the CAC had dissolved.

== Death ==
His Maurice Farman biplane (No. 731 and 70 H.P. Renault engine No. 42767, W.D. 49) crashed during a training exercise for the Royal Flying Corps near Shoreham, W Sussex. He was the first Canadian pilot to die in World War I.

== Bibliography ==
Notes

References

- Library and Archives Canada (2023). "Item Number 223581". Library and Archives Canada.
- Roberts, Leslie (1959). There Shall Be Wings. Toronto: Clark, Irwin & Co. Ltd.
- Skaarup, Harold A. (November 16, 2009). Canadian Warplanes. ISBN 9781440167591. - Total pages: 640
- Veterans Affairs Canada (2023). "Lieutenant William Frederick Nelson Sharpe". Veterans Affairs Canada.
