= Arthur Kellam Tylee =

Canadian air force commander

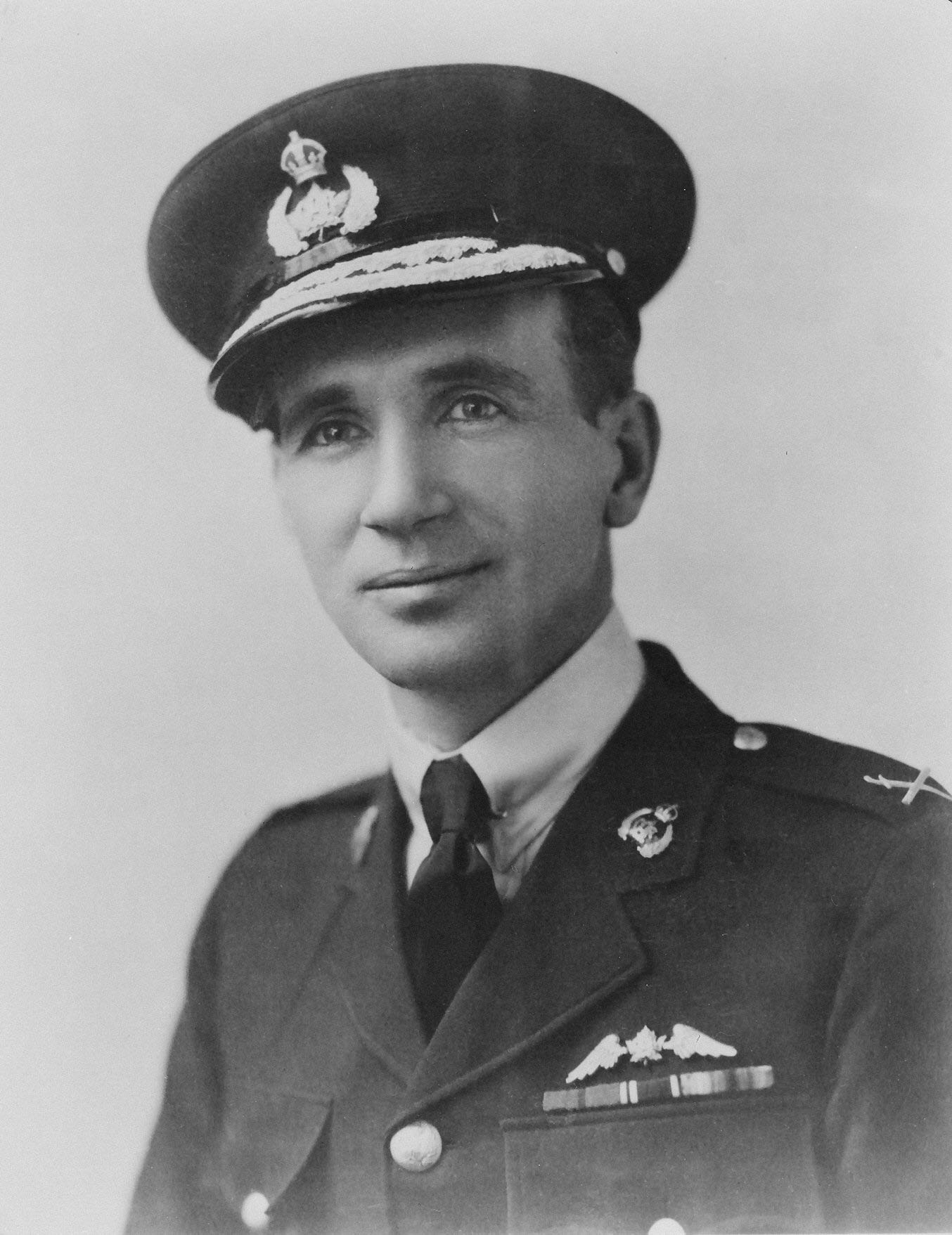
- Born: 24 April 1887
- Died: 13 April 1961 (aged 73); Quebec
- Burial place: Compton Cemetery, Quebec
- Relatives: Robert Smith Tylee 1809-1845
- Military career
- Allegiance: Canada; British Empire
- Service years: Canadian Air Force
- Rank: Air Commodore
- Commands: Canadian Air Force
- Conflicts: World War I

Air Commodore Arthur Kellam Tylee OBE (24 April 1887 – 13 April 1961) was a Canadian officer who served in the Royal Flying Corps during World War I. After the War, Tylee was the first Air Officer Commanding of the Canadian Air Force.

== Early life ==
Tylee was born on 24 April 1887 in Lennoxville, Quebec (now Sherbrooke, Quebec), the son of Arthur Mailland Tylee and his wife Harriet F. Kellam. Tylee later studied at the Massachusetts Institute of Technology from around 1910 to 1913.

== Military career ==
Tylee enlisted in the Royal Flying Corps in August 1915, and was commissioned as a probationary second lieutenant in December of that year; he had previously held the rank of lieutenant in the Canadian Militia. At least some of his junior years in the RFC were spent flying the Martinsyde G.100 on No. 23 Squadron on the Western Front. Tylee was made a flight commander in February 1917 and in March he was made a squadron commander and given the temporary rank of major. It was also in 1917 that Tylee was sent back to Canada, to command Camp Borden in Ontario before being posted to England to carry out advanced work. On 1 April 1918 Tylee was transferred from the Royal Flying Corps to the newly created Royal Air Force in the temporary rank of lieutenant colonel and returned to Canada to serve as the Inspector of Training for the Royal Air Force in Canada. He continued in this role until the end of World War I. In June 1918 Tylee was mentioned in dispatches for valuable war service and he was also made an officer of the Order of the British Empire.

After the War, Tylee returned to Canada. By 1920 Tylee was selected to be the first Air Officer Commanding the Canadian Air Force and granted the rank of air commodore. Tylee established a small headquarters at Ottawa under the oversight of the Air Board on which Air Vice-Marshal Sir Willoughby Gwatkin served. In October 1920 Tyle, accompanied by Flight Lieutenant George Thompson, set out to complete the last leg of the first trans-Canadian flight (which had started in Halifax in July), departing from Calgary in a de Havilland DH-9A. They arrived in Vancouver after 4 days of flying. In February 1921 Tylee turned his attention to the matter of what might make a suitable flag for the Canadian Air Force. In a note he wrote to Gwatkin, Tylee proposed that the RAF Ensign be adopted with a maple leaf at the centre of the roundel. Gwatkin in turn applied to Air Marshal Sir Hugh Trenchard, the British Chief of the Air Staff, who rejected the proposal on the basis that "the sentiment of unity between the Air Services of the Empire" ought to be maintained. It was not until 1940 that Tylee's proposed design was adopted. Later in 1921 Tylee was replaced as commander of the Canadian Air Force by Wing Commander Ronald Redpath

Tylee died on 13 April 1961 and was buried in the Compton Cemetery in Quebec.

Military offices
Vacant Title last held by W A Bishop; As Officer Commanding in 1918	Air Officer Commanding the Canadian Air Force; 1920 - 1921	Succeeded by R F Redpath; As Officer Commanding
