= Harold B. Hudson =

Canadian First World War flying ace

Harold Byron Hudson
- Born: 8 December 1898; Cobham, England
- Died: February 1982 (aged 83); Vancouver, British Columbia, Canada
- Military career
- Allegiance: Canada
- Branch: Royal Flying Corps
- Rank: Lieutenant
- Nickname: Steve
- Units: No. 28 Squadron RAF, No. 45 Squadron RAF
- Awards: Military Cross

Lieutenant Harold Byrn Hudson MC (8 December 1898 – February 1982) was a Canadian First World War flying ace, officially credited with 13 victories. As wingman to William George Barker, he scored a record five victories over observation balloons in a single day.

== Biography ==
Hudson was British-born, but his family relocated to British Columbia in 1912. He joined the Royal Flying Corps, being commissioned a Probationary Temporary Second Lieutenant on 24 May 1917. He was assigned to 28 Squadron in Italy. There Hudson often flew with Captain William George Barker. Indeed, Hudson's first victories were two observation balloons shared with Barker on 24 January 1918. Hudson went on to destroy an Albatros D.V on 5 February. Then, a week later, Barker and Hudson pulled off the unprecedented feat of destroying five kite balloons on a single sortie. By 26 May 1918, Hudson's win total reached seven balloons and six airplanes; besides the mass victories over balloons with Barker, Hudson had destroyed four airplanes and driven two down out of control. He was posted briefly, without success, to 45 Squadron.

Postwar, Hudson returned to Canada to work in pulp mills making paper.

== Honours and awards ==
- 16 September 1918 – T./Lt. Harold Byrn Hudson, R.A.F. is awarded the Military Cross:

For conspicuous gallantry and devotion to duty in destroying four enemy aeroplanes and shooting down two enemy kite balloons in flames.

— London Gazette
