= Ernest Lloyd Janney =

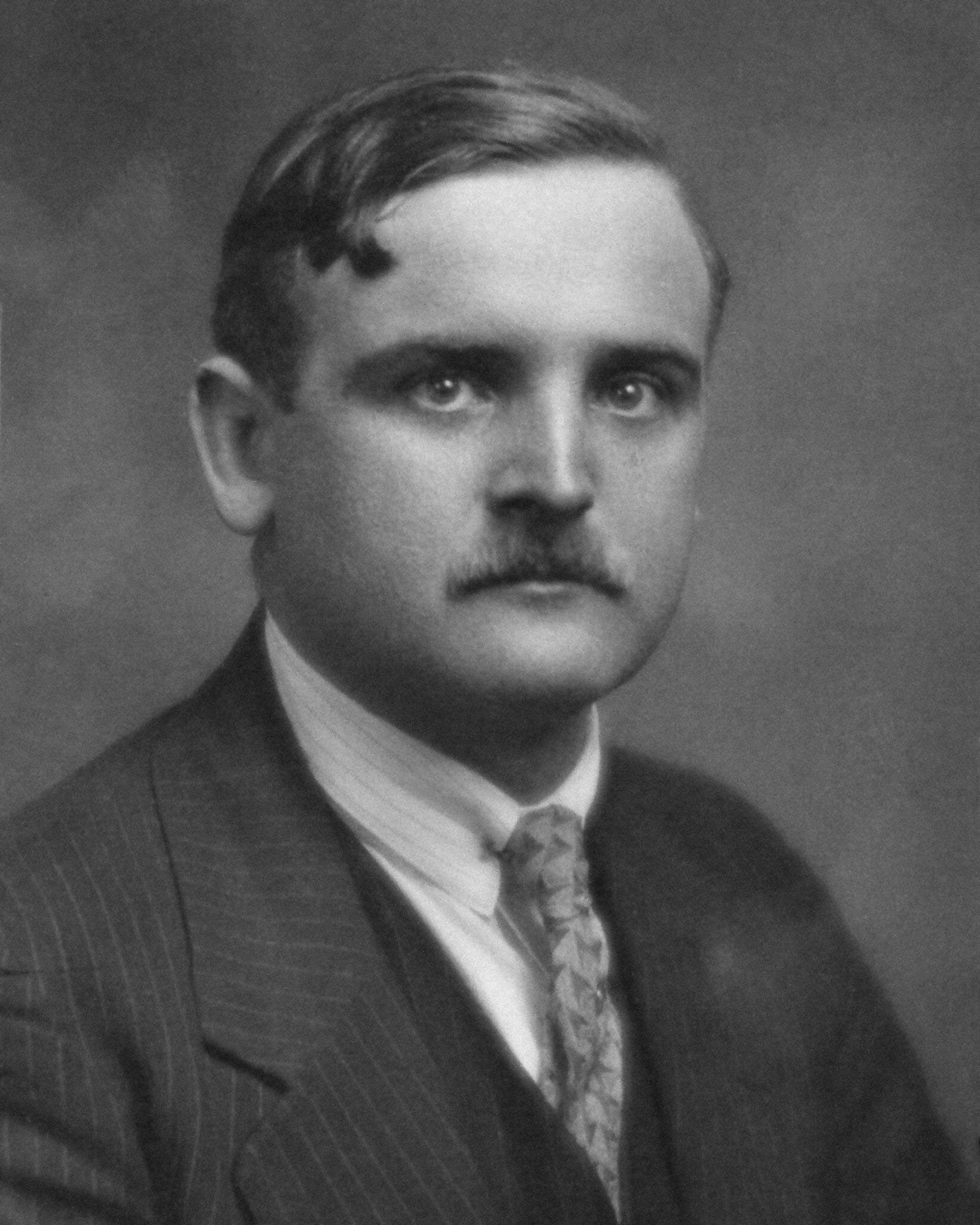
- Born: Ernest Lloyd Janney; June 16, 1893; Galt, Ontario, Canada
- Died: April 22, 1941 (aged 47); Winnipeg, Manitoba, Canada
- Burial place: Brookside Cemetery, Winnipeg, Manitoba, Canada
- Relatives: Father: William W. Janney (1853–1914); Mother: Elizabeth Friend (1850–?)
- Military career
- Allegiance: Canada
- Branch: Canadian Aviation Corps
- Service years: 1914–1915
- Rank: Provisional Commander

Ernest Lloyd Janney (1893–1941) was the Provisional Commander of the Canadian Aviation Corps between 1914 and 1915. Janney pushed for the establishment of a Canadian flying corps during the First World War.

== Career 1914–15 ==
Janney managed to convince Minister of Militia and Defence, Sir Sam Hughes, to commission him as captain and to grant him $5,000 for a flying corps. Janney purchased a floatplane in Massachusetts, United States, a Burgess-Dunne AH-7, then went to England with the pilot, Lieutenant W.F.N. Sharpe, in October, 1914. Janney's aircraft was criticized for not being airworthy, effectively grounding him. He then went on an unauthorized tour of British flying fields and aircraft factories and was listed as absent without leave.

In November 1914, he made an appeal to the federal government for a grant of $116,000 to form a squadron. Janney was then ordered to return home, was stripped of his commission and forced to resign in disgrace December 1, 1914.

== Bay City Airplane Factory 1917–18 ==
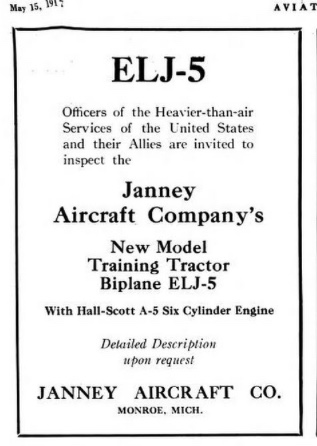
In May, 1917, the Janney Aircraft Co. placed this magazine advertisement stating the new ELJ-5 training biplane was available for inspection.

On November 3, 1917, it was reported "Captain E. L. Janney, Canadian Army aviation instructor" announced "a new factory to manufacture airplane parts for the United States Army has been secured for Bay City, Michigan." It was reported "Bay City, Detroit and Toronto capital is interested in the new factory, which it is understood, already has large orders from the United States government. The old plant of the Bay City Box and Lumber Company has been purchased" so that complete airplanes could be manufactured.

Janney incorporated the "Janney Aircraft Company" for $30,000 - of which $8,000 was cash and $22,000 was "property" which consisted of a Glenn Hammond Curtiss "Farnum bi-plane, designs, etc.". The articles of incorporation claimed the company would manufacture "aerial craft, motor boats, dirigibles and articles of that nature." The company built one biplane, which when tested, "some of the machinery got caught in the grass, and the expected flight did not take place." Janney advertised the plane as "a New Model Training Tractor Biplane ELJ-5, with a Hall-Scott A-5 Six Cylinder Engine." The newspaper article also claimed "Janney went to Bay City, leaving a $137 bill for house rental here, and recently he was reported in California. According to the dispatches from San Francisco, he was arrested there on charges of 'impersonating an officer'."

== Postwar career 1918–1939 ==
In May 1918, he was mentioned in an Admiralty dispatch as a member of the staff of the newly formed Royal Canadian Naval Air Service as a Sub-Lt of the Royal Canadian Naval Volunteer Reserve. Later in 1918, Janney was piloting a Curtiss flying boat that crashed into Toronto Harbour. Janney started a hunger strike in protest against his arrest on a charge of obtaining money under false pretenses in connection with the public float of an aircraft company. In 1921, a news bulletin from Edmonton reported that Captain Janney was organizing a dirigible air service from Peace River, Alberta to Fort Norman, Northwest Territories. However, no records exist of such a service. A month after Charles Lindbergh completed his solo trans-Atlantic flight on May 20, 1927, The New York Times announced that an E.L. Janney would attempt an Ottawa to London, England flight on July 11. No record of that flight has been found either.

In January 1932, he was reported to be working as a businessman and aviation pioneer, a Montreal newspaper described him as the "first Canadian to volunteer his services and be accepted as a war flier". He then dropped from sight. Reportedly, in September 1939, he sent a message to Ottawa: "Am still full of the old pep— let me know what I can do."

Military offices
New title Canadian Aviation Corps established	Provisional Commander of the Canadian Aviation Corps; 1914-1915	Vacant Title next held by Billy Bishop; As Officer Commanding the Canadian Air Force in 1918
