= Canadian Aviation Corps =

Canadian First World War aviation unit

The Canadian Aviation Corps (CAC) was an early attempt to create an air force for Canada at the beginning of the First World War. The unit was created in 1914 and was attached to the Canadian Expeditionary Force. The CAC had a maximum strength of three personnel and one aircraft which was delivered but never used. By May 1915, the unit had ceased to exist.

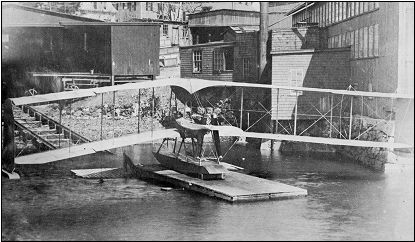
The Burgess-Dunne was Canada's first military aircraft, although it never saw military service.

== History ==
The idea of a Canadian Aviation Corps was conceived by Colonel Sam Hughes, Canada's Minister of Militia and Defence. Hughes had asked British authorities how Canada could help the war effort in the field of military aviation. Britain suggested that Canada could help by supplying military aviators. Hughes appointed Ernest Lloyd Janney as provisional commander and authorized him to spend up to $5000 on an aircraft. A Burgess-Dunne floatplane was purchased in the United States, shipped to Vermont and then flown to Valcartier, Quebec, where it was taken apart, crated, and shipped to England. Janney and the two other CAC members, Lieutenant W. F. Sharpe, a pilot, and Staff Sergeant H. A. Farr, a mechanic, accompanied the aircraft. The aircraft was left abandoned and damaged on Salisbury Plain, having never flown any combat operations. By May 1915, the CAC had dissolved.

A second attempt in creating an air force began with the creation of the Canadian Air Force in 1918.

== Aircraft ==
- One Burgess-Dunne two-seater tailless swept-wing pusher floatplane built by Blair-Atholl Syndicate Limited of England.

== Personnel ==
Personnel were army officers transferred to an air unit with minimal flight training.

- Captain Ernest Lloyd Janney (June 16, 1893, Galt, Ontario – April 22, 1941, Winnipeg, MB) - provisional commander and later sub-lieutenant.
- Lieutenant William Frederick Nelson Sharpe (December 6, 1892, Prescott, Ontario – February 4, 1915, Brighton, England) - pilot. Sharpe later joined the Royal Flying Corps (RFC) but was killed in a flying accident.
- Staff Sergeant Harry A. Farr. A mechanic who left the CAC in 1915, and later joined the RFC in February 1917.

== Related units ==
This unit was allied with the following:

- Royal Flying Corps
- Canadian Expeditionary Force
- Royal Canadian Naval Air Service

== See also ==
- History of the Royal Canadian Air Force
- Air Board (Canada)
- Canadian Air Force (1920–24)
