= Ronald Francis Redpath =

Canadian fighter pilot (1888–1970)

- Born: 7 July 1888; Montreal, Quebec, Canada
- Died: 11 January 1970 (aged 81) Granby, Quebec, Canada
- Allegiance: United Kingdom
- Branch: Royal Naval Air Service; Canadian Air Force
- Service years: 1915 – 1919 (RNAS)
- Rank: Wing Commander
- Conflicts: First World War

Wing Commander Ronald Francis Redpath (7 July 1888 – 11 January 1970) was a Canadian fighter pilot who served in the Royal Naval Air Service (RNAS), later commanding the Canadian Air Force.

== Early life ==
Ronald Francis Redpath was born in Montreal, Quebec, Canada on 7 July 1888, to a merchant home.

== First World War ==
After receiving his flying education at the Toronto flying school, Redpath joined the Royal Naval Air Service as Probationary Flight Sub‑Lieutenant, 22 November 1915 in Ottawa. He was among the original Canadians (along with Raymond Collishaw) to be trained. He was posted on 1 May 1916 to No.3 (Naval) Wing, Manstone. From there he was eventually posted to France. He is credited with ensuring that an early bombing raid did not mistakenly land in Switzerland. Redpath was awarded the French Croix de Guerre along with (amongst others) Raymond Collishaw.

== Post-war ==
After the war, Redpath served as the second director of the Canadian Air Force. He succeeded Air Commodore Arthur Kellam Tylee, taking up post on 22 March 1921. However, his time of head of the Canadian Air Force was short-lived and he relinquished his post on 12 July that same year.

Redpath died on 11 January 1970 at the age of 81.

Military offices
| Preceded by Arthur Kellam Tylee; As Air Officer Commanding the Canadian Air Force | Officer Commanding the Canadian Air Force; 1921 | Succeeded by J S Scott |
