= James Stanley Scott =

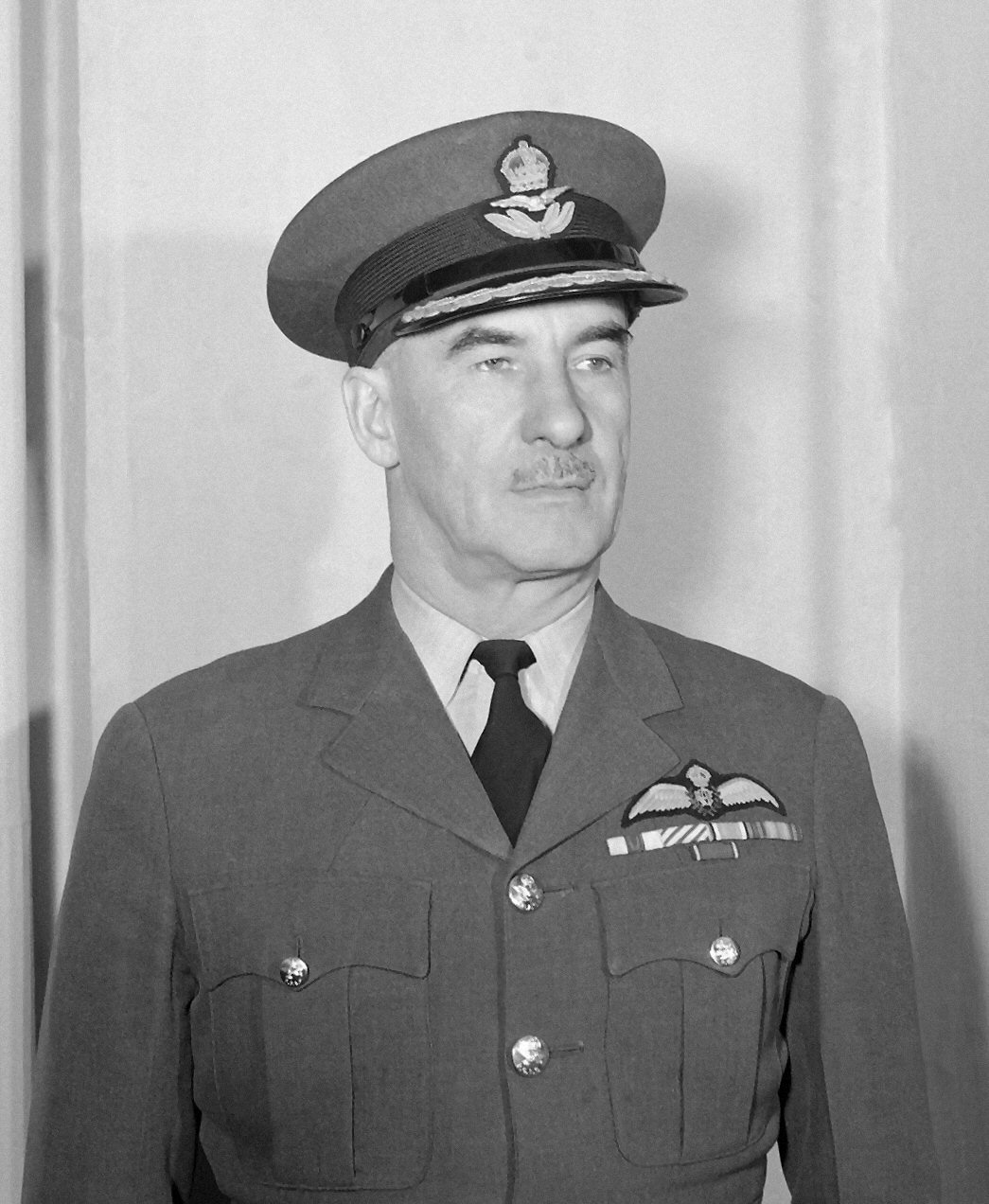
- Born: 18 February 1889; Roberval, Quebec
- Died: 19 July 1975 (aged 86); Halifax, Nova Scotia
- Military career
- Allegiance: Canada
- Branch: (Canada) Royal Canadian Air Force
- Service years: –1945
- Rank: Air Commodore
- Conflicts: World War I World War II
- Awards: Military Cross; Air Force Cross

Air Commodore James Stanley Scott MC, AFC (18 February 1889 – 19 July 1975) was a leading figure in the pre-World War II Royal Canadian Air Force and a Royal Flying Corps officer during World War I.

== Career ==
Scott was born in Roberval, Quebec in 1889 and graduated from Quebec High School.

In March 1916 Scott was seconded from the Canadian Artillery to the Royal Flying Corps. Only four months later in July 1916, while serving as a lieutenant, Scott was awarded the Military Cross for attacking a train well behind the German lines even though his aircraft was very badly damaged by enemy fire. He transferred to the Royal Air Force in 1918 and after the Armistice he was awarded the Air Force Cross.

After the War Scott returned to Canada, and after promotion to wing commander, he served as the Officer Commanding the Canadian Air Force from 1921 to 1922. Two years later, Scott who was promoted to group captain again held the Air Force's senior post, this time as the Director of the Royal Canadian Air Force. During this time he petitioned his superior Major-General J H MacBrien for permission for the Air Force to stop focussing on forestry and photography work in order to train as a fighting force. Scott's request was refused and he continued in post until 1928.

On 1 April 1931, Scott was granted the honorary rank of air commodore.

Scott left the RCAF and returned to duty in 1939 and served during World War II and retired in 1945.

Scott died in Halifax, Nova Scotia in 1975.

== Notes ==
Military offices
Preceded by Ronald Francis Redpath	Officer Commanding the Canadian Air Force; 1921–1922	Succeeded by Lindsay Gordon; As Director
Preceded by William George Barker	Director of the Royal Canadian Air Force; 1924–1928	Succeeded by Lloyd Samuel Breadner
