= Willoughby Gwatkin =

British Army general (1859–1925)

Lieutenant-General Sir Willoughby Gwatkin KCMG CB
- Born: Willoughby Garnons Gwatkin; 11 August 1859; England
- Died: 2 February 1925 (aged 65); Twickenham, England
- Military career
- Allegiance: United Kingdom; Canada
- Branch: British Army; Canadian Militia; Canadian Air Force
- Service years: 1882 – 1922
- Rank: Lieutenant-General
- Commands: Chief of the Canadian General Staff
- Conflicts: World War I
- Awards: Knight Commander of the Order of St Michael and St George; Companion of the Order of the Bath

Lieutenant-General Sir Willoughby Garnons Gwatkin, KCMG, CB (11 August 1859 – 2 February 1925) was a British Army officer who served as Chief of the General Staff of the Canadian Militia during the First World War.

== Military career ==
Gwatkin, the son of a barrister, was born in Twickenham, Middlesex, and was educated at Shrewsbury School, then at King's College, Cambridge. He later went to the Royal Military College, Sandhurst. He was commissioned into the Manchester Regiment as a lieutenant on 10 May 1882 and promoted to captain on 17 January 1890. He attended the Staff College, Camberley, from 1895 to 1896.

He served as staff captain at headquarters when, in January 1900, he was appointed a deputy assistant adjutant-general (temporary), followed by promotion to major on 7 April 1900. The following year, he returned as staff captain, until in October 1902, he was appointed deputy assistant quartermaster-general. He was promoted to brevet lieutenant colonel in January 1904 and lieutenant colonel in October 1905. Later that year, he was posted to Canada as a staff officer, and in 1907, he returned to Britain to attend Staff College and was promoted colonel while serving on half-pay.

In July 1913, he was appointed Chief Staff Officer, Canada, the first to be appointed by the Dominion Government instead of the British War Office. In 1916, he was given the temporary rank of major-general. He retired from the Army in 1920 and was allowed to retain the honorary rank of major-general. He then served as Inspector-General of the Canadian Air Force until 1922 with the rank of air vice-marshal. In this role, he advised and guided Air Commodore Arthur Tylee, Air Officer Commanding the Canadian Air Force. In 1922, Gwatkin was promoted to honorary lieutenant-general in the Canadian Militia Reserve of Officers.

Gwatkin was appointed Companion of the Order of the Bath (CB) in 1916, Companion of the Order of St Michael and St George (CMG) in 1918, and Knight Commander of the Order of St Michael and St George (KCMG) in January 1920. In July 1924, he was appointed honorary colonel of the Manchester Regiment, dying six months later at 65.

== Footnotes ==
Military offices
Preceded by Sir Colin Mackenzie	Chief of the Canadian General Staff; 1913–1920	Succeeded by James MacBrien
