= Lindsay Gordon =

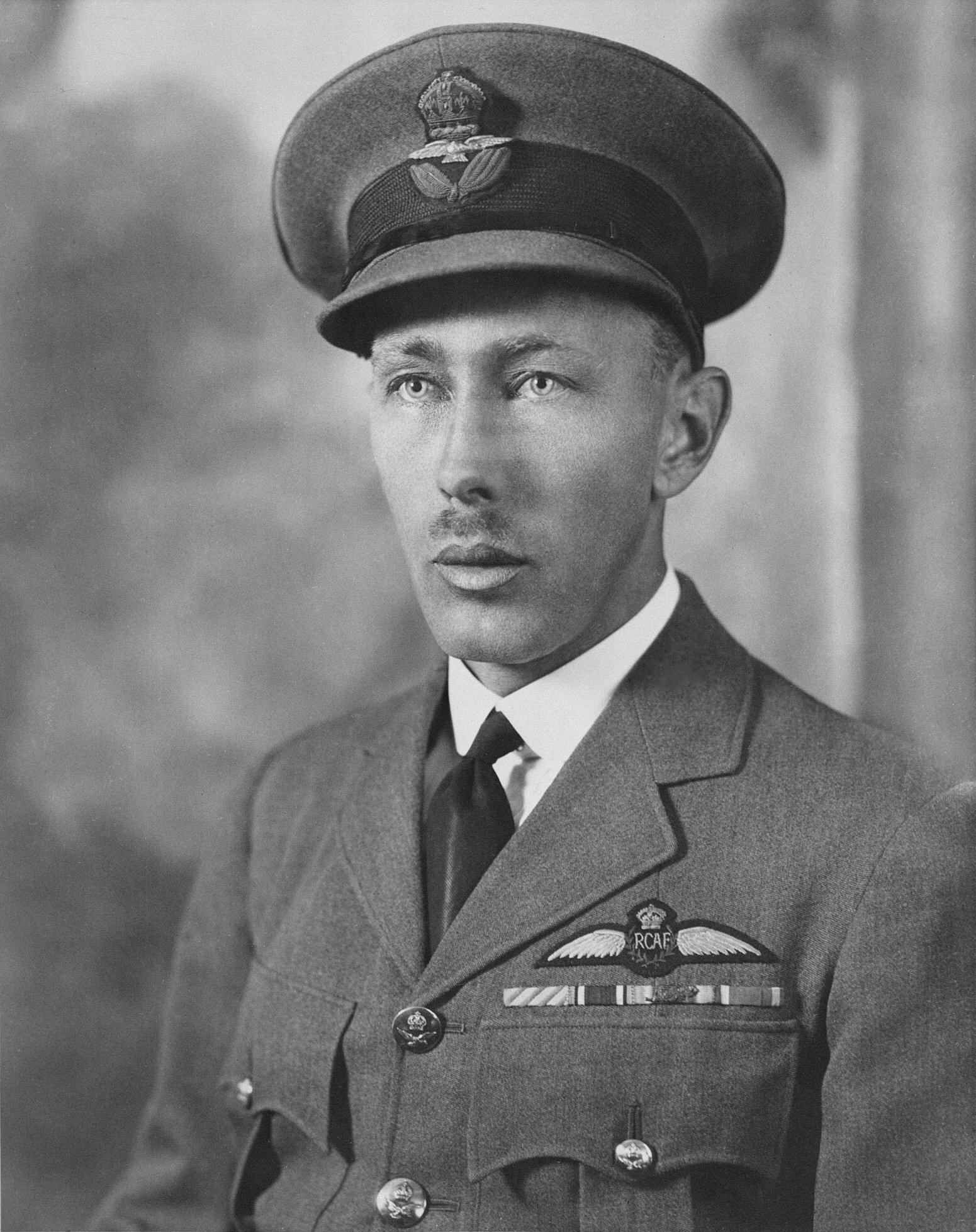
- Born: 11 December 1892; Montreal, Quebec
- Died: 3 March 1940 (aged 47)
- Military career
- Allegiance: Canada
- Branch: (Canada) Royal Canadian Air Force
- Service years: – 1924
- Rank: Air Vice-Marshal
- Conflicts: World War I
- Awards: Distinguished Flying Cross

Air Vice-Marshal James Lindsay Gordon DFC (11 December 1892 – 3 March 1940) was a leading figure in the pre-World War II Royal Canadian Air Force and a pilot in the Royal Naval Air Service during World War I.

== Career ==
James Lindsay Gordon was born on 11 December 1892 in Montreal, Quebec the son of Edward Percy Gordon and his wife Helen Lindsay. The young Gordon was educated at Montreal High School and McGill University.

In 1918, while a member of the Royal Air Force, Gordon was awarded the Distinguished Flying Cross. His citation was as follows:

A pilot of great experience, initiative and skill. Has led formations over the seas and attacked with success enemy aircraft in their own area. Capt. Gordon has been instrumental in saving life in disabled seaplanes on several occasions, and whenever any arduous duty has to be done, he is always to the fore to carry it out.

From 1922 to 1924 Gordon was the first Director of the Royal Canadian Air Force. Promoted to air vice-marshal in 1938, Gordon continued to serve until poor health forced him to retire in January 1940. Gordon died only a few weeks later in March of that year.

== Notes ==
Military offices
Preceded by J S Scott; As Officer Commanding the CAF	Director of the Canadian Air Force; 1922 – 1924	Succeeded by W G Barker; As Director of the RCAF
Preceded by A A L Cuffe; As Director of the RCAF	Senior Air Officer (RCAF); 1932 – 1933	Succeeded by G O Johnson
