= Operation Impact =

Ongoing military operation of the Canadian Armed Forces

Operation IMPACT
- Part of the War against the Islamic State and the war on terror
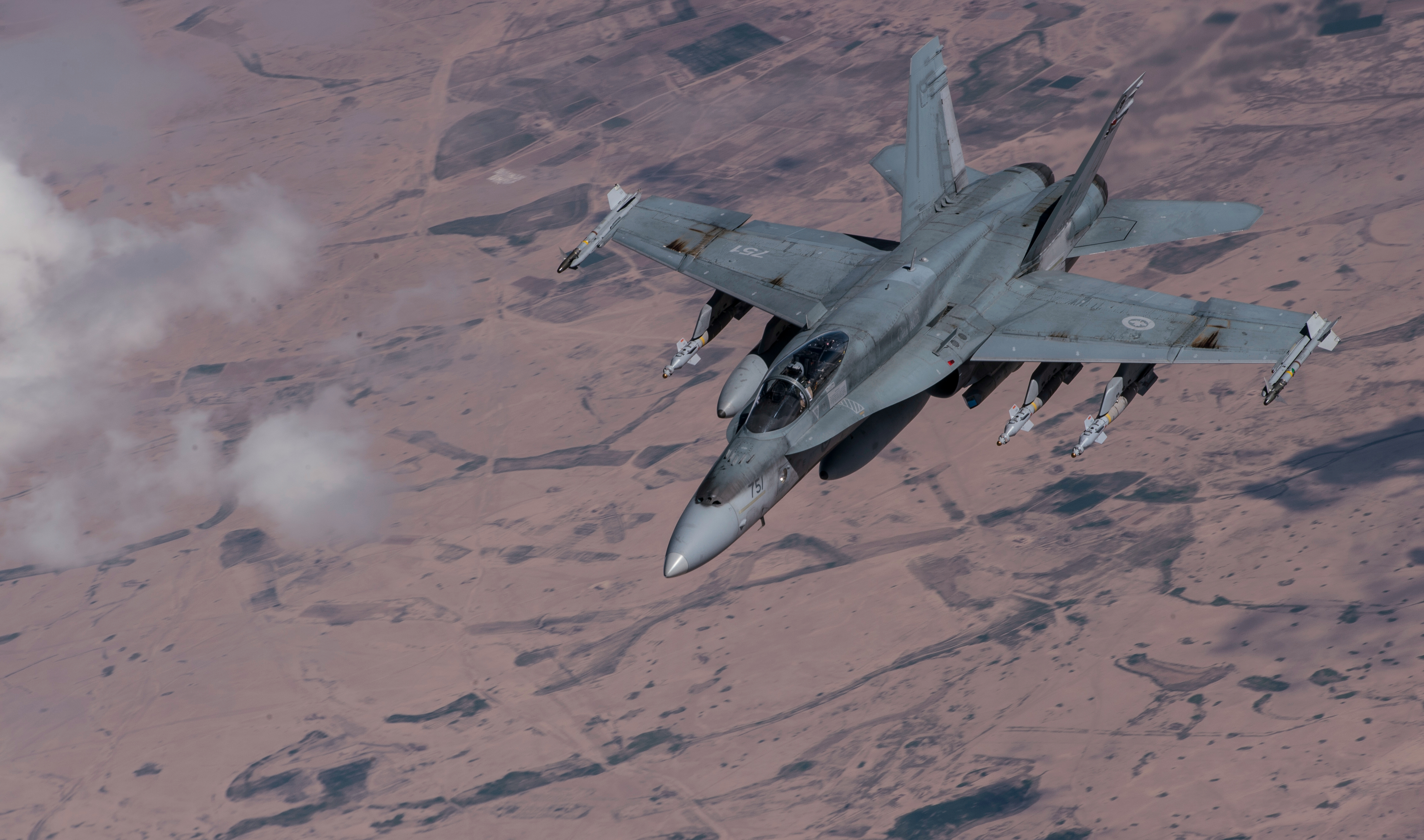
- A Royal Canadian Air Force CF-18 flies over Iraq in support of Operation IMPACT on 4 March 2015.
Date	1 September 2014 – 21 March 2025 (10 years, 6 months, 2 weeks and 6 days)
Location	Iraq (2014–2025); Syria (2015–16)
Status	Ground operations ongoing; Canadian airstrikes on ISIL ended in February 2016; ISIL ground attacks on Canadian special forces repelled; JTF2 conducting long range targeting of ISIL militants; Operations in Syria concluded in January 2016

Belligerents
Canada	Islamic State

Commanders and leaders
(Canada) Mark Carney (Note: after 2025); (Canada) David McGuinty (Note: after 2025); Jennie Carignan; Robert Claude "Bob" McCann; Steve Boivin; Steve Hunter; Former: (Canada) Stephen Harper (Note: before 2015); (Canada) Justin Trudeau (Note: 2015–2025); (Canada) Rob Nicholson; (Canada) Jason Kenney; (Canada) Harjit Sajjan; (Canada) Anita Anand; (Canada) Bill Blair; Thomas J. Lawson; Jonathan Vance; Art McDonald; Wayne Eyre; Kevin West; Alain Guimond; Gilles Gregoire; Marquis Hainse; Paul Wynnyk; Jean-Marc Lanthier; Wayne Eyre; Yvan Blondin; Michael Hood; Al Meinzinger; Mark Norman; Ron Lloyd; Art McDonald; Craig Baines; ● Major-General Michael Rouleau; ● Major-General Peter Dawe	Abu Hafs al-Hashimi al-Qurashi (Leader of IS); Abu al-Hussein al-Husseini al-Qurashi †; Abu al-Hasan al-Hashimi al-Qurashi †; Abu Ibrahim al-Hashimi al-Qurashi †; Abu Bakr al-Baghdadi †; (Islamic State) Abu Ali al-Anbari †; Abu Suleiman al-Naser †; Abu Omar al-Shishani †; Abu Waheeb †

Units involved
Canadian Joint Operations Command; Canadian Special Operations Forces Command	Military of ISIL

Strength
Canadian Armed Forces: ≈200 special forces operators; 596 CF personnel (including special forces); 7 CF-18 Hornet multi-role fighters. All of them were withdrawn in February 2016.; 3 CH-146 Griffon multi-role aircraft; 2 CP-140 Aurora surveillance aircraft; 2 CC-130J Hercules tactical airlifter; 1 CC-177 Globemaster strategic airlifter	Up to 200,000 fighters in Iraq and Syria

Casualties and losses
1 killed (friendly fire)	Unknown

On 3 October 2014, Canadian Prime Minister Stephen Harper announced that he would put forth a motion to send forces to participate in the coalition for the War against the Islamic State by deploying combat aircraft. On 7 October 2014, the House of Commons approved of sending nine aircraft to join coalition airstrikes against ISIL in Iraq along with 69 special forces advisors to train the Iraqi government's military. The Canadian Armed Forces' contribution to the coalition against ISIL was later dubbed Operation IMPACT. On 30 March 2015, the House of Commons voted to extend the mission to targets in Syria. No additional forces were announced.

In late November 2015, new Prime Minister Justin Trudeau announced the withdrawal of Canada's fighter aircraft from the fight against ISIL, but their surveillance and transport and refuelling aircraft would remain in the area. All airstrikes by the Canadian fighter aircraft ended as of 15 February 2016. As part of the Canadian reorganization of the operation in February 2016, it was announced the number of military trainers would triple to a total of 600 ground personnel. This force was later augmented in mid-May 2016 by three Bell CH-146 Griffon helicopters.

On 20 July 2016, Defence Minister Harjit Sajjan announced that Canada was deploying a field hospital in support of United States and French troops in their effort to retake Mosul. The hospital required 60 personnel; however, the minister said that the number of committed to the overall operation would not climb. The hospital's deployment would be for one year.

On 7 January 2020, the Canadian Armed Forces announced that Operation Impact would be suspended following the assassination of the Iranian general Qasem Soleimani in Iraq earlier in the month, with some non-essential personnel being moved to Kuwait. On 16 January, it was announced that operations had resumed.

In March 2021, the Canadian government extended the military mission against the remnants of ISIS by another year, and pledged to commit $43.6 million to stabilization programs in Iraq and Syria. The mission was once again extended by one year in March 2022 and again extended to 31 March 2025 in March 2023.

== Airstrikes ==
=== Decision ===
On 4 September 2014, the Canadian government announced that it would deploy up to 100 special forces to Iraq in a non-combat advisory role to the military operation against ISIL in Iraq. Later it was confirmed that 69 Canadian forces were operating in Iraq.

On 3 October 2014, Prime Minister Stephen Harper announced a motion in the House of Commons that it was Canada's intent to send six CF-18 fighter jets and support aircraft for up to six months to attack ISIL in Iraq as part of the coalition to defeat ISIL. "In the territory ISIL has occupied, it has conducted a campaign of unspeakable atrocities against the most innocent of people", also ISIL "has specifically targeted Canada and Canadians", Harper said.

Harper left open the possibility of Canadian involvement also in the US-led intervention in Syria against ISIL, but on the condition that Syria's government would approve of it.

On 7 October, the House of Commons voted in favour of sending six CF-18 fighter jets, an air-to-air refueling aircraft and two surveillance aircraft to join coalition airstrikes against ISIL in Iraq, to conduct targeted airstrikes from an allied air base in Kuwait.

=== In Iraq ===
==== 2014 ====
The first Canadian airstrike against an Islamic State target in Iraq occurred on 2 November 2014. It was reported that CF-18s successfully destroyed heavy engineering or construction equipment used to divert the Euphrates River near the city of Fallujah.

On 11 November, CF-18s dropped laser guided bombs near the city of Baiji, in Northern Iraq. The Department of National Defence stated that the strike targeted equipment that could have been used to attack coalition assets. On 17 November, a warehouse used by ISIS was struck by CF-18s. It was believed to be a site for the construction of roadside bombs. On 19 November 2014, two CF-18s attacked ISIL positions northwest of Kirkuk. On 27 November 2014, it was confirmed that Canadian jets had not performed any air strikes for several days, but continued to provide escort for coalition cargo flights. On 28 November, Canadian CF-18s supported Iraqi security force operations around Hīt in Anbar Province, performing strikes against ISIL positions. On 30 November Canadian fighter jets struck ISIL forces southeast of Mosul in an area controlled by the group.

Striking ISIL forces near Mosul, CF-18s from Canada attacked mortar positions and an armoured car. Canadian CF-18s continued to partake in coalition attacks, striking ISIL positions consisting of two bunkers and two machine gun emplacement northeast of Mosul on 5 December. Two CF-18s struck ISIL positions east of Al Qa'im, destroying a bunker on 10 December. They were supported by a CP-140 Aurora performing reconnaissance.

Airstrikes intensified later in December, with ISIL targets successfully struck on 17, 19 and 20 December, 22 and 24 December. Canadian airstrikes continued, attacking near Fallujah on 31 December.

==== 2015 ====
Canadian aircraft attacked ISIL targets in two separate areas on 1 January 2015, northwest of Baghdad and around Al-Qa'im. Canadian airstrikes continued, supporting coalition ground operations around Haditha on 8 January 2015 and near Ramadi on 9 January. They supported coalition troops again on 10 January near Haditha and on 11 and 12 January south of Bayji.

An airstrike on an ISIL position along a highway northwest of Mosul was performed on 21 January in support of efforts to retake the road. Claims that between 6 and 27 civilians were killed surfaced, which led to an investigation by the United States military. The claims were deemed not justifiable by the Canadian Armed Forces and was not investigated by that force. CF-18s continued to attack ISIL positions on 23 January, striking in conjunction with coalition ground forces northeast of Mosul. On 24 January, they attacked ISIL forces southeast of Mosul and on 25 January, supported ground operations northeast of Mosul. On 29 January, Canadian CF-18s attacked two ISIL positions and two vehicles. Following that on 30 January, they bombed an ISIL position northwest of Baghdad.

On 3 February, CF-18s bombed an ISIL explosives factory southwest of Mosul and on 5 February, Canadian jets struck an ISIL compound northwest of Baghdad. On 6 February, attacks were made on ISIL positions northwest of Mosul. These were followed on 7 February with bombing missions on ISIL fighting positions northeast of Mosul and around Baiji. From 26 January to 12 February the RCAF performed 14 airstrikes in total.

After a break, Canadian strikes resumed on 24 February, hitting three targets north of Mosul. On 7 March, Canadian jets struck ISIL positions south of Kirkuk and on 8 March, hit sites southeast of Haditha. On 9 March, Canadian airstrikes continued, attacking sites west of Kirkuk. On 19 March, CF-18s hit a reported ISIL bomb-making factory near Kirkuk and struck ISIL positions east of Mosul on 20 March.

On 4 April 2015, Canadian CF-18s hit an IED factory west of Mosul while supporting coalition operations. CF-18s attacked ISIL positions near Sinjar on 9 April. On 25 April, two CF-18s struck ISIL staging areas in Kharbani and on 26 April, hit fighting positions east and west of Fallujah. On 6 May, air strikes were made on ISIL positions north of Bayji, followed up by a strike against an ISIL bomb installation on 8 May southeast of Haditha. A CF-18 returned to Bayji on 9 May, hitting ISIL fighting positions. On 27 May, CF-18s struck an ISIL fighting position south of Mosul. Two days later, on 29 May, they attacked ISIL fighting positions northwest of Tal Afar and northwest of Mosul.

On 6 June, CF-18s hit ISIL fighting positions north of Bayji. 20 airstrikes were performed in June 2015. In the four weeks leading up to 9 July, Canadian jets struck 18 times, the most recent coming on 5 July, when an ISIL fighting position was hit southeast of Fallujah. 30 airstrikes were performed in July. 12 airstrikes were performed in August. 10 airstrikes were performed in September.

As of October 2015, Canada had made 172 airstrikes against ISIL targets in Syria and Iraq, making up 2.3 percent of all Allied attacks since the onset of the war. Between 19 October and 12 November 2015, the Canadian CF-18s performed 11 air strikes. On 5 November 2015, Canadian jets attacked ISIL positions around Sinjar in support of an Iraqi offensive to retake the city, as well as an ISIL position near the city of Tal Afar. On 15 November, Canadian aircraft performed an airstrike on ISIL positions near Haditha.

In early December, Canadian aircraft supported efforts to recapture Ramadi from ISIL forces. On 17 December, two CF-18s participated in air support vs ISIL attacking forces during the Nineveh Plains Offensive. Russian and Iraqi media reports surfaced soon after claiming that Canadian aircraft had been involved in a friendly fire incident with an Iraqi soldier near Fallujah on 18 December. Those reports were later denied by Canadian officials, stating that Canada did not send their aircraft in the vicinity of Fallujah on that date.

==== 2016 ====
On 1 January 2016, two CF-18s struck ISIL forces near Ramadi while supporting Iraqi ground efforts. The following day, four aircraft in two pairs attacked ISIL positions near Mosul. On 3 January, two strikes were committed against ISIL positions near Al-Baghdadi. On 14 January, CF-18s attacked an ISIL position near Tikrit. On 28 January, airstrikes were performed against targets northwest of Fallujah. Two days later, a fighting position northeast of Ramadi was hit by CF-18s.

On 10 February, airstrikes against ISIL targets took place near Al Habbaniyah and north of Ramadi. On 14 February, an ISIL fighting position was attacked near Fallujah. The CF-18s were withdrawn from the theatre on 15 February 2016. In total, the aircraft performed 1378 sorties, conducting 251 airstrikes.

=== In Syria ===
On 30 March 2015, the House of Commons voted to extend the mission to targets in Syria. No additional forces were announced. It was suggested that airstrikes into Syria could begin within a couple of days of the vote. Canadian airstrike operations in Syria began 8 April 2015. Two CF-18s attacked an ISIL garrison near Raqqa. The Canadian jets were joined by six US aircraft in the strike. Prior to the attack, Canadian aircraft had performed three sorties into Syrian airspace. On 20 May 2015, two Canadian jets bombed an ISIL staging area north of Raqqa. In June 2015, CF-18s attacked near Al-Hasakah in eastern Syria. In total, the Canadian jets performed five airstrikes in Syria.

=== Withdrawal from airstrikes ===
On 20 October 2015, Prime Minister-designate Justin Trudeau announced the impending withdrawal of Canadian air forces from the anti-ISIL mission in Iraq and Syria while keeping its ground forces in Iraq and Syria, and informed US President Barack Obama about it. In late November 2015, new Prime Minister Justin Trudeau announced the withdrawal of Canada's fighter aircraft from the fight against ISIL, but their surveillance and transport and refueling aircraft would remain in the area. All airstrikes by the Canadian fighter aircraft ended as of 15 February 2016.

== Air support operations ==
As of March 2019, Canada had roughly six aircraft total in the Middle East which are two CC-130J Hercules transport aircraft and up to four CH-146 Griffon helicopters. Canada's Hercules aircraft were used to support the movement of Coalition personal and cargo throughout the region. As of 17 February 2019, The CC-130Js had flown a total of 1,852 sorties and had delivered roughly 4,428.6 t (9,763,300 lb) of cargo. The Griffons were used for carrying troops, equipment and supplies in theatre near Baghdad. The CH-146s are also capable of completing casualty evacuations with a variety of self-defence weapons fitted to the aircraft.

As of 12 March 2016, CC-150 Polaris aircraft had performed 399 sorties. In total, they delivered roughly 23,500,000 lb (10,700,000 kg) of fuel to allies. On 28 January 2019, the CC-150 aircraft from 437 Transport Squadron returned to 8 Wing at CFB Trenton. Throughout their time deployed in Kuwait at Ali Al Salem Air Base, they had completed a grand total of 1,116 sorties, had flown over 7,050 flying hours and delivered a total of 29,914.5 tonnes (65,950,200 lb) of fuel to Coalition aircraft.

== Ground operations ==
Along with the aircraft, 69 special forces advisors were deployed as training advisors to Iraqi militaries. Their mission was to aid in the "planning of operations, train forces and to enable airstrikes, both in defence and on the offensive." However, in the initial motion that was approved by the House of Commons, it was stated that Canada would not deploy ground troops in combat operations.

In 2014, it was reported that JTF-2 operators mentored their counterparts from the Iraqi Counter Terrorism Service and the Anti-Terror Units.

On 16–17 December 2015, Canadian ground forces came under attack from ISIL ground units while training Peshmerga fighters north of Irbil. On 17 December, the Canadian troops supported the Peshmerga in its counterattack against ISIL.

While enabling airstrikes in support of Iraqi militaries, the troops exchanged fire with ISIL ground units. Although Canada's role is primarily advisory, as Canadian special forces troops were sent to observe the progress of Iraqi forces. They responded in defence with sniper fire against an ISIS mortar and machine gun attack. The special forces provided by Canada engaged in two more firefights between 20 and 26 January. The troops came under attack and returned fire, ending the attacks on their positions. Between 26 January and 12 February, Canadian ground troops came under fire once more, in similar circumstances as previous incidents. On 6 March, a Canadian soldier, Sergeant Andrew Joseph Doiron was killed in a friendly fire incident by Kurdish forces while returning to an observation post. The Canadian Armed Forces said that roughly 20% of their training missions with the Kurds take place at or near the front lines in the conflict, with the other 80% taking place well behind.

As part of the Canadian reorganization of the operation, in February 2016, it was announced that the fighter aircraft would be withdrawn while tripling the number of military trainers provided by Canada for a total of 600 ground personnel.

In mid-May 2016, three Bell CH-146 Griffon helicopters from 427 Special Operations Aviation Squadron were deployed to support Canadian ground forces in Iraq. On 29 May 2016 Canadian special forces came under mortar fire from ISIL during a battle for villages 20 kilometres (12 mi) east of Mosul. ISIL mortar fire had been directed at Kurdish targets around the Canadian staging base at Hassan Shami. 427 Special Operations Squadron was relieved by elements of 430 Tactical Helicopter Squadron in October 2016 and an additional Bell CH-146 Griffon was deployed to the region.

On 20 July, Defence Minister Harjit Sajjan announced that Canada was deploying a field hospital in support of United States and French troops in their effort to retake Mosul. The hospital requires 60 personnel, however the Minister said that the number of committed to the overall operation would not climb. The hospital's deployment would be for one year. The four-bed hospital opened in November 2016 after delays by the Iraqi government.

As of 8 September 2016 there were 596 Canadian personnel deployed in the mission, operating in four countries of which just over a quarter were taking part in special forces operations. Canadian troops were deploying to the front-line of battle more often and had exchanged fire with ISIS on multiple occasions. Canadian soldiers have opened fire without warning on ISIL targets "when the Peshmerga cannot respond."

As of 15 November 2016, the Canadian government had spent CA$3.5 million on the creation of a semi-permanent military camp at Irbil. The camp housed several units of the Canadian ground operation. Construction began in June 2016. On 7 January 2020, the Canadian Armed Forces stated that they had paused Operation Impact operations after the United States assassinated the Iranian general Qasem Soleimani in Iraq earlier in the month, with some non-essential personnel being moved to Kuwait. On 16 January it was announced the operations had resumed in Iraq.

== Politics ==
The House of Commons voted on 7 October 2014 with 157 votes to approve Canadian airstrikes against ISIL with 134 votes against. After the vote, opposition leader Tom Mulcair of the New Democratic Party (NDP) said the government was "plunging Canada into a prolonged war without a credible plan to help victims of ISIL terror", and "opening the door" to getting Canada involved in the "bloody" Syrian civil war.

In the initial announcement of the decision, the special forces troops were not to be used for combat operations, instead be deployed in a primarily training mission. However, after the announcement that the troops had seen combat, the opposition defence critic, Jack Harris, said that "if we're engaged in firefights because we're subject to machine-gun fire, that's not what Canadians were told." The Prime Minister's Office argued that highlighting targets for airstrikes does not equal combat operations.

The cost of the operation for the first six months were announced by the new Defence Minister, Jason Kenney, stating it to be approximately $122 million. This claim was challenged by the Parliamentary Budget Officer (PBO), Jean-Denis Fréchette, who put forth that the cost was between $128.8 and $166 million. However this analysis was affected by the Department of National Defence refusing all PBO requests for information, and was based on analogy and known costing factors, extrapolating from past missions and operations.

The possibility of extending the mission was put forth in the House of Commons on 12 March 2015; however, the government said that there would be no increase in the deployment of ground forces. On 30 March, the House of Commons voted to extend the mission into Syria, to attack ISIL targets operating from and in that country. The NDP attempted to amend the vote, saying that the intervention into Syria was illegal under international law, but those amendments failed and the main vote passed 142–129. On 1 April, Kenney announced the cost of the extended mission, claiming an additional $406 million for the extra year and expanded operational zone.

Following his election on 19 October 2015, Prime Minister-Designate Justin Trudeau used a congratulatory phone call from the US President Barack Obama to inform him that Canada would eliminate its air combat role in Iraq and Syria, while maintaining the presence of its ground forces. This was later amended with only the fighter element being withdrawn. The Polaris, Auroras and transport aircraft remained in support of allies. This move was criticized by the new Conservative Official Opposition, with one of its members claiming it was a "weak response" to ISIL.

The Canadian Armed Forces estimated $305.8 million in costs for the operation in 2016 and budgeted $41.9 million for 2017–2018.

== ISIL response in Canada ==
ISIL spokesperson Abu Muhammad Al-Adnani incited and advocated for a campaign of terror against both Canadian civilians and military personnel. He performed a 42-minute speech in September 2014 that called on Muslims to attack members of the coalition against ISIL, including, among others, Canada.

On 20 October 2014, Martin Couture-Rouleau who referred to himself as "Ahmad LeConverti" (Ahmad the Converted) struck two Canadian soldiers with his car in Saint Jean sur Richelieu, Quebec. Warrant Officer Patrice Vincent, later died in hospital. Rouleau had converted to Islam in 2013; and, as he made known through comments published in his social media online accounts and via interactions with friends and family, Rouleau progressively became increasingly extremist in his views.

Concerned that Rouleau intended to act on his extremist rants, the Crown had ordered Rouleau's passport seized earlier in July 2014 on the completion of an act in furtherance, wherein Rouleau had been intercepted trying to travel to Turkey, utilizing a common entry point for ISIL operatives. The Royal Canadian Mounted Police (RCMP), however, did not have enough further evidence to constitutionally justify detaining Rouleau.

Rouleau was fatally wounded by police constables of the Sûreté du Québec following a car chase. Rouleau appeared to have acted of his own accord as a 'lone rat' (that is, consistent with and in furtherance of known ISIL political views but without provable direct and overt conspiracy with ISIL).

On 22 October 2014, Michael Zehaf-Bibeau fatally shot reservist Corporal Nathan Cirillo as he stood as an Honour Guard at the National War Memorial. After shooting Cirillo, Bibeau advanced towards the Parliament buildings, where caucus meetings of the main political parties were being conducted. He shot a guard in the leg and was chased down the Hall of Honour past rooms where Members of Parliament (MPs) were meeting. The MPs barricaded the doors as a violent gunfight ensued. Bibeau was shot dead by House of Commons Sergeant-at-Arms Kevin Vickers in the Hall of Honour of the Centre Block.

Zehaf-Bibeau had a lengthy criminal record of criminal activity in British Columbia, Ontario, and Quebec. Although police detected no provable conspiracy between Zehauf-Bibeau and ISIL (and therefore in that narrow legal sense, Zehauf-Bibeau could only be deemed to have acted alone) Prime Minister Stephen Harper explained in a televised address after the attack that it remained the position of the Governor-in-Council that the attacks were motivated to assist ISIL in response to Operation Impact.

On 3 February 2015, the RCMP apprehended a member of an ISIL recruiting cell. Awso Peshdary was arrested for conducting the operations of the cell. Fellow cell members John Maguire and Khadar Khalib were charged in absentia as they are fighting for ISIL overseas. ISIL produced a video of McGuire urging supporters in Canada to commit acts of terror.

== See also ==
- Operation Okra - Australian operation against ISIL
- Opération Chammal - French operation against ISIL
- Operation Shader - UK operation against ISIL
- Operation Inherent Resolve - US operation against ISIL
- Operation Martyr Yalçın - Turkish operation against ISIL
- Gill Rosenberg - one of a few Canadians volunteering to fight with the Kurds
