= General Clement =

General Clement may refer to:

- Albéric Clément (c. 1165–1191), Kingdom of France general
- Charles M. Clement (1855–1934), U.S. Army National Guard major general
- Noel Clement (born 1964), Philippine Army general
- William T. Clement (1894–1955), U.S. Marine Corps lieutenant general

== See also ==
- Ralph Arthur Penrhyn Clements (1855–1909), British Army major general
- Scott Clements (general) (born c. 1941), Royal Canadian Air Force lieutenant general
- Léon Émile Clément-Thomas (fl. 1880s–1890s), French general
