= Canadian Air Transport Security Authority =

Canadian Crown Corporation agency

Agency overview
- Formed: April 1, 2002
- Jurisdiction: Federal government of Canada
- Headquarters: Sun Life Financial Centre, 99 Bank Street, Ottawa, Ontario
- Employees: 507 (2024)
- Minister responsible: Steven MacKinnon, Minister of Transport
- Agency executive: Neil Parry, Interim President & Chief Executive Officer (CEO)
- Parent department: Transport Canada
- Website: CATSA

The Canadian Air Transport Security Authority (CATSA; French: Administration canadienne de la sûreté du transport aérien) is the Canadian Crown Corporation responsible for security screening of people and baggage and the administration of identity cards at the 89 designated airports in Canada (81 of which are currently active). CATSA responds to Transport Canada and reports to the Government of Canada through the Minister of Transport.

The federal budget presented on March 19, 2019, included a reference to the possibility of privatizing CATSA. On June 21, 2019, Parliament passed the Security Screening Services Commercialization Act, which allows the Governor-in-Council to designate a private not-for-profit corporation as the designated screening authority to take over and privatize the screening duties of CATSA. However, as a result of COVID-19, the privatization plans have been delayed with no clear timeline for discussions to resume.

== Constitution ==
The Canadian Air Transport Security Authority was officially formed on April 1, 2002, following the terrorist attacks on September 11, 2001 in the United States. After 9/11 incident, the Government of Canada took responsibility for airport screening which, until then, was the responsibility of the airlines as per direction from Transport Canada. The Canadian Air Transport Security Authority Act (Budget Implementation Act, 2001) provides additional security requirements as prescribed under the Aeronautics Act.

CATSA shares responsibility for civil aviation security with several federal government departments and agencies, air carriers, and airport operators. Transport Canada is Canada's designated national civil aviation security regulator, under the standards established by the International Civil Aviation Organization (ICAO). CATSA contracts screening services to private security companies. There were 8,984 active-duty personnel across Canada who screened a combination of 66.6 million passengers in 2024.

== Controversy ==
CATSA has been implicated by the Privacy Commissioner of Canada for collecting non-aviation security information from the travelling public. For example, a domestic traveller with large sums of solid cash (not illegal) was reported by CATSA to the local police. Of the 10,400 reported incidents in CATSA's databases at the time of the audit, more than half had nothing to do with aviation security.

== Presidents of CATSA ==
Three of the five former presidents of CATSA have come from law enforcement backgrounds: Duchesneau and McGarr had both previously served with the Montreal Urban Community Police Service (SPCUM), while Saunders served in a managerial capacity with the Royal Canadian Mounted Police (RCMP). Watt, however, came from a military background instead, having previously served as the Commander of the Royal Canadian Air Force. Former President Semaan has previously served in a variety of directorate roles within the Federal government of Canada, most notably as Executive Vice President of the Canada Border Services Agency (CBSA). Interim President Parry has been with CATSA since 2002. Parry held various roles with the Federal Government of Canada before joining CATSA.

- Jacques Duchesneau, 2002–2008
- Kevin McGarr, 2008–2012
- Angus Watt, 2012–2017
- Michael Saunders, 2017–2023
- Nada Semaan, 2023–2025
- Neil Parry, 2025–present (interim)

== See also ==
- Canadian Air Carrier Protection Program
- Transportation Security Administration
