= Meinzinger =

Meinzinger may refer to:

- Al Meinzinger, Royal Canadian Air Force officer
- Joseph Ignatino Meinzinger (1892 – 1962), Canadian insurance salesman and political figure
