= General Hood (disambiguation) =

John Bell Hood (1831–1879) was a Confederate general. General Hood may also refer to:

- Alexander Hood, 1st Viscount Bridport (British Army officer) (1814–1904), British Army general
- Jay W. Hood (fl. 1970s–2010s), U.S. Army major general
- Michael Hood (fl. 1980s–2010s), Royal Canadian Air Force lieutenant general

== See also ==
- Jim Hood (born 1962), Attorney General of Mississippi
