= David Huddleston (general) =

Canadian air force general

- Military career
- Allegiance: Canada
- Branch: Royal Canadian Air Force / Canadian Forces
- Service years: 1960 - 1993
- Rank: Lieutenant-General
- Commands: Air Command
- Conflicts: Gulf War
- Awards: Commander of the Order of Military Merit; Meritorious Service Cross; Canadian Forces' Decoration

Lieutenant-General David Huddleston CMM, MSC, CD is a Canadian retired air force general who was Commander, Air Command in Canada from 1991 to 1993.

== Career ==
Huddleston joined the Royal Canadian Air Force in 1960 and trained on Lockheed T-33 jet trainers. He became Associate Deputy Minister (Policy) at the Department of National Defence in 1986 and Deputy Chief of Defence Staff at the National Defence Headquarters in 1989 and, in the latter role, was responsible for the formation of the Joint Staff (or 'J Staff') who were to be the primary Canadian Forces strategic planning and coordination organ. This innovation was applied during the Gulf War in 1990 and, for leading Canada's deployment in that war, he was awarded the Meritorious Service Cross. He went on to be Commander, Air Command later that year before retiring in 1993.

In retirement he worked for Bombardier Inc.

Military offices
Preceded by F.R. Sutherland	Commander, Air Command; 1991–1993	Succeeded by G S Clements
