= Eric Kenny =

Royal Canadian Air Force officer

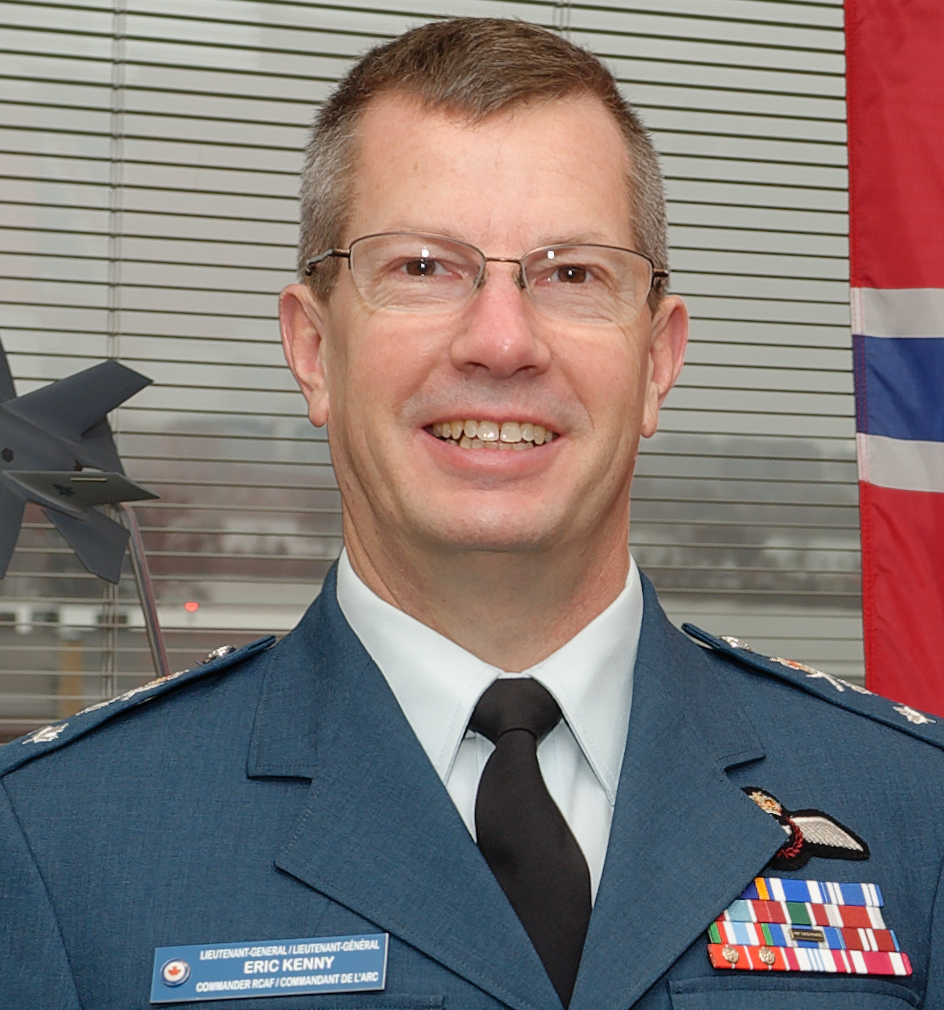
- Kenny in 2023
- Military career
- Allegiance: Canada
- Branch: Royal Canadian Air Force (Note: Known as Air Command until 2011)
- Service years: 1989–2025
- Rank: Lieutenant-General
- Commands: 4 Wing Cold Lake; 1 Canadian Air Division; Royal Canadian Air Force
- Awards: Commander of the Order of Military Merit; Meritorious Service Cross; Meritorious Service Medal

Lieutenant-General Eric Jean Kenny CMM MSC MSM CD is a senior Royal Canadian Air Force officer who served as Commander of the Royal Canadian Air Force from 2022 to 2025.

== Military career ==
Kenny joined the Canadian Armed Forces in 1989. After training as a fighter pilot on the McDonnell Douglas CF-18 Hornet, he became commander of 4 Wing Cold Lake in 2014 and, in that capacity, was deployed as commander of the Air Task Force–Iraq in Kuwait between October 2014 and April 2015. He went on to be Deputy Commander at 1 Canadian Air Division in Winnipeg in 2016, Director General of Air Readiness at Headquarters Royal Canadian Air Force in Ottawa in 2018 and commander of 1 Canadian Air Division in July 2020. On 12 August 2022, he became the Commander of the Royal Canadian Air Force.

On 10 July 2025, Kenny retired from the Royal Canadian Air Force, passing his position as the Commander of the Royal Canadian Air Force to Jamie Speiser-Blanchet.

== Honours and decorations ==
Honours and decorations include:

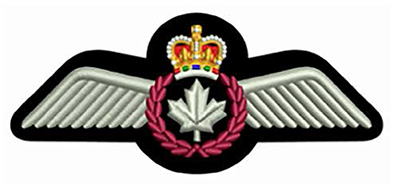

Ribbon	Description	Notes
	Commander of the Order of Military Merit	CMM
	Meritorious Service Cross	MSC
	Meritorious Service Medal	MSM
	General Campaign Star - Allied Forces	
	General Campaign Star - South-West Asia	
	General Service Medal - Expedition	
	Canadian Peacekeeping Service Medal	
	NATO Operation Unified Protector - Libya	
	Queen Elizabeth II Diamond Jubilee Medal	
	Canadian Forces' Decoration	CD
	Defense Meritorious Service Medal - USA	
	Meritorious Service Medal - USA	

== Notes ==
Military offices
Preceded by Al Meinzinger	Commander of the Royal Canadian Air Force; August 2022 – July 2025	Succeeded by Jamie Speiser-Blanchet
