= Jamie Speiser-Blanchet =

Royal Canadian Air Force officer

Lieutenant-General Jamie Speiser-Blanchet CMM CD
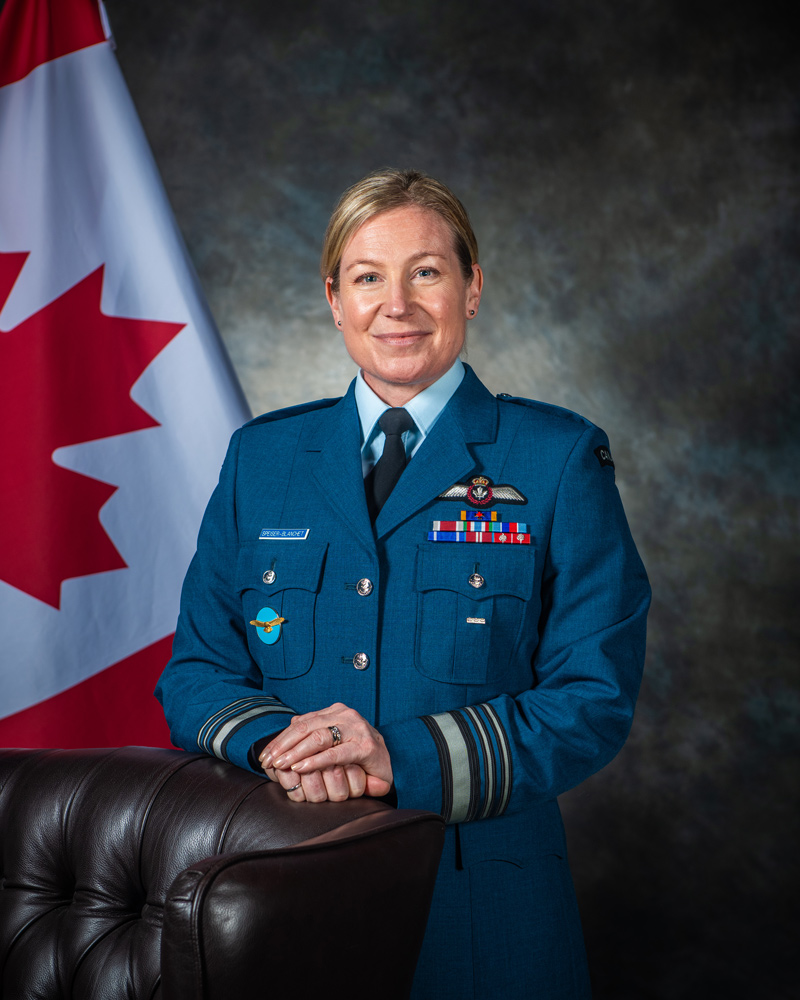
- Military career
- Allegiance: Canada
- Branch: Royal Canadian Air Force (Note: Known as Air Command until 2011)
- Service years: 1990–present
- Rank: Lieutenant-General
- Commands: 403 Helicopter Operational Training Squadron; National Cadet and Junior Canadian Rangers Support Group Headquarters; Royal Canadian Air Force
- Awards: Commander of the Order of Military Merit; Canadian Forces' Decoration

Lieutenant-General Jamie Speiser-Blanchet CMM CD is a senior Royal Canadian Air Force officer who has been serving as Commander of the Royal Canadian Air Force since 2025.

== Military career ==
Speiser-Blanchet joined the Canadian Armed Forces in 1990. After training as a helicopter pilot, she became commanding officer of 403 Helicopter Operational Training Squadron in July 2014. She went on to be commander, National Cadet and Junior Canadian Rangers Support Group Headquarters in July 2021, Deputy Commander, Royal Canadian Air Force in July 2023 and Commander of the Royal Canadian Air Force in July 2025.

== Honours and decorations ==
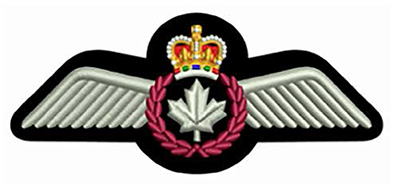

Ribbon	Description	Notes
	Commander of the Order of Military Merit	CMM
	General Service Medal - Expedition	
	Canadian Peacekeeping Service Medal	
	UN Mission in Haiti	
	NATO Medal for the Former Yugoslavia	
	Queen Elizabeth II Diamond Jubilee Medal	
	Canadian Forces' Decoration	CD

== Notes ==
Military offices
Preceded by Eric Kenny	Commander of the Royal Canadian Air Force; July 2025 – present	Incumbent
