= André Deschamps (RCAF officer) =

Joseph Paul André Deschamps
- Allegiance: Canada
- Branch: Royal Canadian Air Force (Note: Known as Air Command until 2011)
- Service years: 1977-2012
- Rank: Lieutenant General
- Commands: Squadron 2, NAB Geilenkirchen; 8 Wing Trenton; Royal Canadian Air Force
- Conflicts: War in Afghanistan
- Awards: Commander of the Order of Military Merit; Canadian Forces' Decoration

Lieutenant-General Joseph Paul André Deschamps, CMM, CD, usually André Deschamps or J P A Deschamps, was Chief of the Air Staff and then Commander of the Royal Canadian Air Force between 2009 and 2012.

== Career ==
Deschamps joined the Canadian Forces in 1977, and completed pilot training the following year. As a junior officer Deschamps carried out instructor duties on the Musketeer trainer. He later flew the CF-104 Starfighter in Europe during the Cold War.

Deschamps served as the Commanding Officer of Squadron 2, NATO Air Base Geilenkirchen, Germany, and became Commanding Officer of 8 Wing Trenton in 2004, and then commanded the Theatre Support Element (Camp Mirage) in support of Operation Athena in Afghanistan. He was appointed Chief of Staff - Operations of Canadian Expeditionary Force Command in 2006, Assistant Chief of the Air Staff in June 2008 and Chief of the Air Staff in October 2009. It was during his tenure that Air Command was renamed the "Royal Canadian Air Force".

== Honours ==
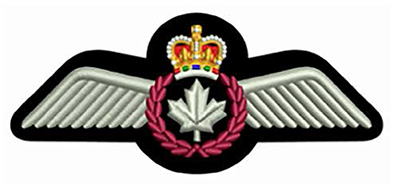

Ribbon	Description	Notes
	Order of Military Merit (CMM)	Commander; 26 February 2010
	Gulf and Kuwait Medal	With Clasp
	General Campaign Star	With South-West Asia Ribbon; With "ISAF+FIAS" Clasp
	Special Service Medal	With "NATO-OTAN" Clasp
	Queen Elizabeth II Diamond Jubilee Medal	Canadian Version of this Medal; 2012
	Canadian Peacekeeping Service Medal	
	NATO Medal	With "FORMER YUGOSLAVIA" Clasp
	NATO Medal	With "KOSOVO" Clasp
	Canadian Forces' Decoration (CD)	With 2 Clasps; 32 Years of Service in the RCAF

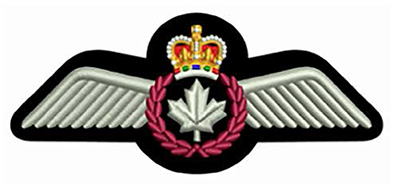
- He was a qualified RCAF Pilot and as such wore the Royal Air Canadian Forces Pilot Wings.

== Notes ==
Military offices
Preceded by J D A Hincke	Assistant Chief of the Air Staff; 2008–2009	Succeeded by T J Lawson
Preceded by A Watt	Chief of the Air Staff (Commander of the Royal Canadian Air Force from 2011); 2009–2012	Succeeded by J Y Blondin
