= George Croil =

Canadian air marshal (1893–1959)

- Croil in full dress uniform
- Born: June 5, 1893; Milwaukee, Wisconsin, U.S.
- Died: April 8, 1959 (aged 65); Vancouver, British Columbia, Canada
- Military career
- Allegiance: British Empire; Canada
- Branch: British Army (Canada) Royal Canadian Air Force
- Service years: 1914–1944
- Rank: Air Marshal
- Conflicts: World War I World War II
- Awards: Commander of the Order of the British Empire; Air Force Cross

Air Marshal George Mitchell Croil CBE, AFC (June 5, 1893 – April 8, 1959) was an American-born Canadian Royal Flying Corps pilot during World War I who went on to become the first Chief of the Air Staff of the Royal Canadian Air Force. Croil resigned as CAS in 1940 and then served as Inspector-General of the RCAF until his retirement in 1944, when the post of Inspector General was abolished.

== Early life ==
Croil was born on June 5, 1893, in Milwaukee, Wisconsin. His parents, Thomas Croil and Christian Mitchell, were Scottish immigrants to the United States. Croil was a first cousin of US Major General Billy Mitchell, who, like Croil, was a pioneer of military aviation in the US.

When Croil was 11 years old, his family moved to Canada and settled in Montreal, Quebec, where he attended Westmount Academy from 1903 to 1907. From 1907 to 1911, Croil lived in Scotland, studying at Robert Gordon's College in Aberdeen. Remaining in Great Britain, Croil studied Civil Engineering and was chartered as an engineer 1912.

In 1912 Croil moved to Ratnapura, Ceylon where he gained employment as an assistant superintendent with the Mahawale Tea and Rubber Estate until 1914, where he maintained machinery and supervised workers.

== World War I ==
With the outbreak of World War I, Croil enlisted in the Gordon Highlanders as a private soldier. He was soon commissioned, serving as a machine gun officer in the 5th Battalion of the Gordon Highlanders. In January 1915, he received an acting promotion to captain and took up duties as a company commander.

In May 1916, Croil was detached to the Royal Flying Corps and undertook a two-month period of flying training. On successfully completing the course and receiving his pilot's wings in July 1916, Croil was seconded from the Gordon Highlanders to the Royal Flying Corps with the temporary rank of captain.

== Interwar service ==
Croil became a member of the Canadian Air Board in June 1920 and played a key role in the establishment of air bases at Morley and High River in Alberta. He went on to become one of the founding officers of the Royal Canadian Air Force at the time of its establishment in 1924. Although the RCAF was described as an air force and had a separate rank structure in line with the Royal Air Force of Great Britain, it was under the authority of the Canadian Army. The following year, in 1925, Croil was posted to Britain where he served as a liaison officer with the RAF. Croil also took a course of training at the RAF Staff College, Andover.

Returning to Canada by 1928, Croil was appointed Station Commander of RCAF Station Borden in Ontario, which, at that time, was one of the very few RCAF training bases. Returning to Britain for further advanced training, Croil attended the Imperial Defence College. Crossing back across the Atlantic once more in 1934, Croil was appointed Senior Air Officer with the RCAF, making him the head of the RCAF. In 1938, Croil succeeded in ensuring the RCAF's separation from the Army, and his post was upgraded to Chief of the Air Staff as a result. He also reported directly to the Minister of National Defence.

== World War II and later life ==
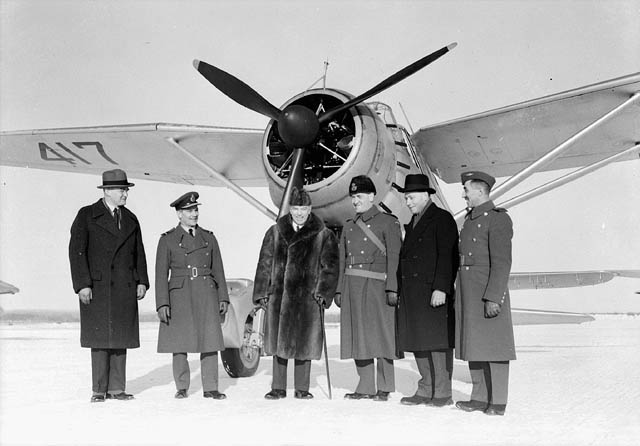
Rt. Hon. W.L. Mackenzie King inspecting No. 110 (City of Toronto) Squadron, R.C.A.F. The aircraft in the background is Westland 'Lysander' II 417. [L-R]: Hon. T.A. Crerar, Air Marshal G.M. Croil, Rt. Hon. W.L. Mackenzie King, W/C W.D. Van Vliet, Hon. Norman Rogers, 13 January 1940.

Croil remained as Chief of the Air Staff until 1940 when he was forced to resign after a falling out with Charles Gavan Power, then-Minister of Defence for Air. Power was replaced two months later following Croil's resignation. Croil then served as the Inspector-General of the Royal Canadian Air Force until 1944.

Croil died on April 8, 1959, in Vancouver, British Columbia.

Military offices
Unknown	Station Commander of Camp Borden; 1928–1932	Unknown
Preceded by G O Johnson	Senior Air Officer; 1934–1938	Title discontinued Service head upgraded to Chief of the Air Staff
New title RCAF became an independent service	Chief of the Air Staff; 1938–1940	Succeeded by L S Breadner
Unknown	Inspector-General of the Royal Canadian Air Force; 1940–1944	Post abolished
