= Steve Lucas =

Canadian air force general (born 1952)

James Steve Lucas
- Born: 24 February 1952 (age 74); Toronto, Ontario, Canada
- Military career
- Allegiance: Canada
- Branch: Canadian Forces Air Command
- Service years: 1969-2007
- Rank: Lieutenant General
- Commands: 435 Transport Squadron; CFB Goose Bay; 1 Canadian Air Division / Canadian NORAD Region; Air Command
- Awards: Commander of the Order of Military Merit; Canadian Forces' Decoration

Lieutenant-General James Steven Lucas, CMM, CD (born 24 February 1952) is a retired Canadian air force general who was Chief of the Air Staff in Canada from 2005 to 2007.

== Career ==
Educated at John Taylor Collegiate in Winnipeg, Lucas joined the Canadian Forces in 1969 and graduated from the Canadian Forces Air Navigation School in 1974. He became Commanding Officer of 435 Transport Squadron in July 1989, Commander of CFB Goose Bay in 1990 and Director of Joint Requirements at the National Defence Headquarters in 1994. He went on to be Director of Aerospace Planning Coordination in 1996, and then joined the staff at 1 Canadian Air Division Headquarters in Summer 1997. After that he became Commander of 1 Canadian Air Division / Canadian NORAD Region in 2000, Chief of Staff Joint Force Generation in 2003 and Chief of the Air Staff in 2005 before retiring in 2007.

Military offices
Preceded by Lloyd Campbell	Commander of 1 Canadian Air Division; 2000–2002	Succeeded by Marc Dumais
Preceded by Ken Pennie	Chief of the Air Staff; 2005–2007	Succeeded by Angus Watt
