= Yvan Blondin =

Canadian air force officer

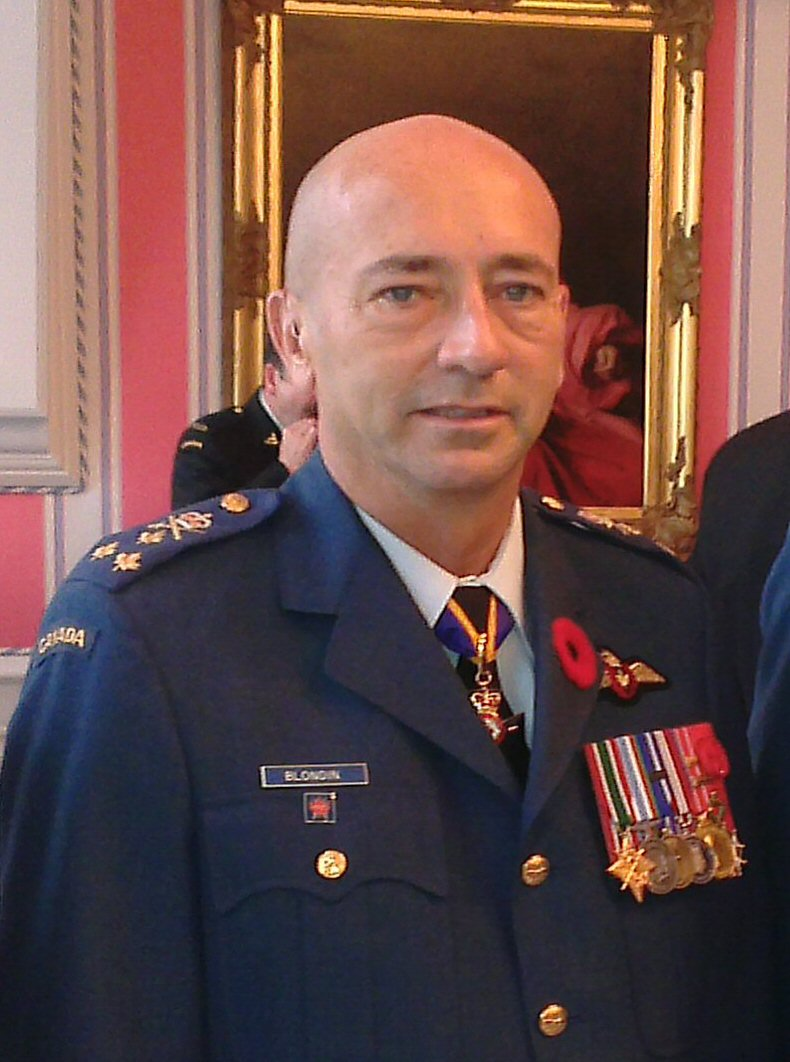
- Lieutenant-General J. Yvan Blondin
- Born: Montreal, Quebec, Canada
- Military career
- Allegiance: Canada
- Branch: Royal Canadian Air Force (Note: Known as Air Command until 2011)
- Service years: 1980 – 2015
- Rank: Lieutenant General
- Commands: 425 Tactical Fighter Squadron; 3 Wing Bagotville; 1 Canadian Air Division; Royal Canadian Air Force
- Conflicts: War in Afghanistan; Military intervention against ISIL
- Awards: Commander of the Order of Military Merit; Canadian Forces' Decoration

Lieutenant-General Joseph Aimé Jean Yvan Blondin CMM, CD, usually given as J Y Blondin or Yvan Blondin, is a retired senior Royal Canadian Air Force officer who was Commander of the Royal Canadian Air Force from 2012 until 2015.

== Early and family life ==
Yvan Blondin grew up in Aylmer, Quebec (now Gatineau). He is married to Jinny Lamoureux.

== Career ==
Blondin joined the Canadian Forces in 1980 and completed his flight training in 1982. He was assigned to fly Lockheed T-33 jet trainers for his first operational tour. In 1986, he underwent fighter pilot training on the CF-5 and CF-18, and became part of the first group of pilots flying the CF-18 with 433 Squadron in Bagotville, Quebec in 1988. He became Commanding Officer of 425 Tactical Fighter Squadron at Bagotville in 2000 (in which role he supported NATO forces in the former Yugoslavia), a member of the Canadian staff in NORAD Headquarters in 2002 and Commander of 3 Wing Bagotville in 2004. He was deployed to Afghanistan, as Director of Staff in ISAF Headquarters, in 2006 and then assigned as Deputy Commander Force Generation at 1 Canadian Air Division in Winnipeg in 2007. He attended the Space Operations Course for senior leaders at the National Security Space Institute in January 2008 and served as the Commander of 1 Canadian Air Division / Canadian NORAD Region from July 2009 to July 2011 when he was appointed Assistant Chief of the Air Staff. He became Commander of the Royal Canadian Air Force on September 27, 2012.

== Notes ==
Military offices
Preceded by J M Duval	Commander of the 1 Canadian Air Division / Canadian NORAD Region; 9 July 2009 – July 2011	Succeeded by J A J Parent
Preceded by T J Lawson	Assistant Chief of the Air Staff; July 2011 – September 2012	Succeeded by M J Hood; As Deputy Commander RCAF
Preceded by J P A Deschamps	Commander of the Royal Canadian Air Force; September 2012 – July 2015	Succeeded by M J Hood
