= Angus Watt (general) =

Canadian general

William Angus Watt
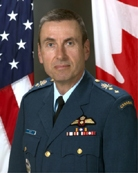
- Watt in 2005 as a major-general
- Allegiance: Canada
- Branch: Air Command
- Service years: 1972-2009
- Rank: Lieutenant General
- Commands: 423 Maritime Helicopter Squadron; Joint Task Force Southwest Asia; Air Command
- Conflicts: War in Afghanistan
- Awards: Commander of the Order of Military Merit; Canadian Forces' Decoration

Lieutenant-General William Angus Watt, CMM, CD is a Canadian retired air force general who was Chief of the Air Staff from 2007 to 2009. He served as the president and chief executive officer of the Canadian Air Transport Security Authority from 2012 to 2017.

== Career ==
Watt joined the Canadian Forces in 1972 and, after graduating from the Royal Military College Saint-Jean in 1977, trained as a pilot before flying Sea King helicopters.

He served as commanding officer of 423 Maritime Helicopter Squadron before becoming commander of Joint Task Force Southwest Asia (for Operation Apollo) in 2002.

He was the director of operations at NORAD in 2004 until March 2005, when he was appointed the Assistant Chief of the Air Staff at National Defence Headquarters in Ottawa. He subsequently served as deputy commander of the International Security Assistance Force in Afghanistan in 2006 and went on to become Chief of the Air Staff in 2007 before retiring in 2009.

He became president and chief executive officer of the Canadian Air Transport Security Authority in 2012.

== Honours ==
Watt's personal awards and decorations include the following:

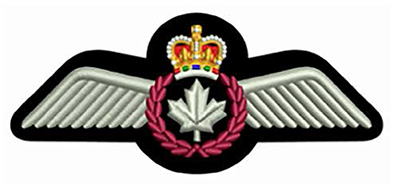

Ribbon	Description	Notes
	Order of Military Merit (CMM)	Commander; 9 November 2007; Officer 31 May 2002
	South-West Asia Service Medal	
	General Campaign Star	With South-West Asia Ribbon; With "ISAF+FIAS" Clasp
	Special Service Medal	With "NATO-OTAN" Clasp
	Queen Elizabeth II Diamond Jubilee Medal	Canadian Version of this Medal; 2012
	Canadian Forces' Decoration (CD)	With 2 Clasps; 32 Years of Service in the RCAF
	Legion of Merit	Degree of Officer; 17 June 2006; Awarded by the United States of America
	NATO Medal	For Meritorious Service; With Bar

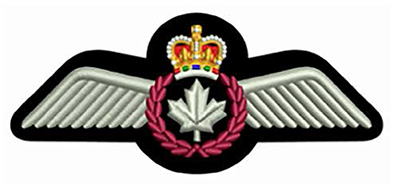
- He was a qualified RCAF Pilot and as such wore the Royal Air Canadian Forces Pilot Wings.

Military offices
Preceded by J S Lucas	Chief of the Air Staff; 2007–2009	Succeeded by J P A Deschamps
