= Allan DeQuetteville =

Canadian general

- Military career
- Allegiance: Canada
- Branch: Air Command (Note: Known as Royal Canadian Air Force until 1968)
- Service years: 1963–1997
- Rank: Lieutenant-General
- Commands: CFB Baden-Soellingen; 4 Fighter Wing; 1 Canadian Air Division; Air Command
- Awards: Commander of the Order of Military Merit; Canadian Forces' Decoration

Lieutenant-General Allan Marvin DeQuetteville CMM, CD is a retired Canadian air force general who was Commander, Air Command in Canada from 1995 to 1997.

== Career ==
DeQuetteville joined the Royal Canadian Air Force in 1962 and trained as a fighter pilot. He flew CF-18 Hornets before becoming Base Commander at CFB Baden-Soellingen in 1985 and Commanding Officer of 4 Fighter Wing in May 1988. He went on to be Commander 1 Canadian Air Division in July 1988, Director General Force Development at the National Defence Headquarters in July 1990 and Chief of Force Development in July 1992. His last appointments were as Deputy Commander Air Command in July 1994 and Commander, Air Command in June 1995 before retiring in April 1997.

In retirement he became Vice-President (Canada) for Boeing.

== Notes ==
Military offices
| Preceded by G S Clements | Commander, Air Command; 1995–1997 | Succeeded by D N Kinsman (as Chief of the Air Staff) |
