= David Kinsman =

Retired Canadian Air Force general

- Born: 1945 or 1946 (age 80–81)
- Military career
- Allegiance: Canada
- Branch: Air Command (Note: Known as Royal Canadian Air Force until 1968)
- Service years: 1963–2000
- Rank: Lieutenant-General
- Commands: 433 Tactical Fighter Squadron; CFB Cold Lake; 14 Training Group; Fighter Group; Air Command
- Awards: Commander of the Order of Military Merit; Canadian Forces' Decoration

Lieutenant-General David Nevill Kinsman CMM, CD (born 1945/1946) is a Canadian retired air force general who was Chief of the Air Staff in Canada from 1997 to 2000.

== Career ==
Educated at Acadia University, Kinsman joined the Royal Canadian Air Force in 1963 and trained as a fighter pilot. He flew CF-101 Voodoos with 416 Tactical Fighter Squadron and with 425 Tactical Fighter Squadron. He served as Commanding Officer of 433 Tactical Fighter Squadron, Deputy Commander of the CF-18 Hornet Detachment in St. Louis County, Missouri and as Director of Air Studies at the Canadian Forces Command and Staff College in Toronto. He went on to be Commander of CFB Cold Lake in 1986, Commander of 14 Training Group at Winnipeg in 1988 and Chief of Staff Operations at Air Command Headquarters in 1990. After that he became Commander of the Fighter Group and Canadian NORAD Region in 1994, Director General Manpower Utilization in 1995 and Assistant Deputy Minister for Personnel in 1996 before becoming Chief of the Air Staff in 1997 and retiring in 2000.

== Notes ==
Military offices
Preceded by A M DeQuetteville (as Commander, Air Command)	Chief of the Air Staff; 1997–2000	Succeeded by L C Campbell
