= George Owen Johnson =

Canadian aviator

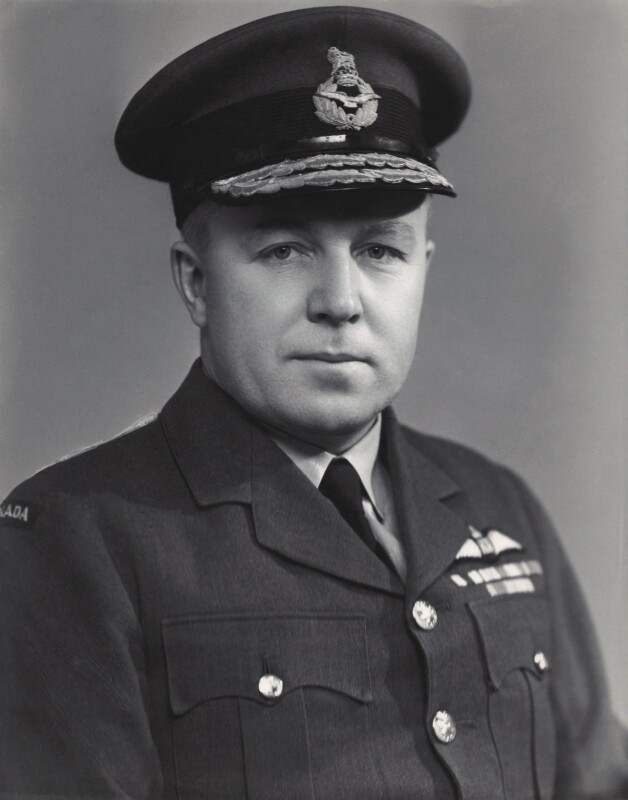
- Born: 24 January 1896; Woodstock, Ontario
- Died: 28 March 1980 (aged 84); Vancouver, British Columbia
- Military career
- Allegiance: Canada
- Branch: (United Kingdom) Royal Naval Air Service (United Kingdom) Royal Flying Corps; (United Kingdom) Royal Air Force; (Canada) Canadian Air Force (1918-20); (Canada) Canadian Air Force (1920-24); (Canada) Royal Canadian Air Force
- Service years: 1913–1947
- Rank: Air Marshal
- Nickname: G.O.
- Units: No. 84 Squadron RAF; No. 24 Squadron RAF; Canadian Air Force (1918–20) No. 1 Squadron
- Commands: CFB Borden; CFB Winnipeg; CFB Trenton; Commander of the Royal Canadian Air Force; RCAF Western Air Command; RCAF Eastern Air Command; RCAF Overseas Headquarters
- Conflicts: World War I; World War II; Battle of the Atlantic; European theatre
- Awards: Companion of the Order of the Bath; Military Cross; Croix de Guerre; Légion d'honneur; Legion of Merit; King Haakon VII Freedom Cross (Norway)

Air Marshal George Owen Johnson CB, MC (24 January 1896 – 28 March 1980) was a Canadian aviator, World War I Flying Ace and a senior commander in the Royal Canadian Air Force during World War II. Born in Woodstock, Ontario, he began his military career as a teenager and went on to serve in the Royal Flying Corps during the First World War, accumulating eleven aerial victories and earning the Military Cross.

During the interwar years, Johnson played a foundational role in establishing the infrastructure of Canadian military and civil aviation, helping to build the RCAF from the ground up during a period of severe resource constraints. In the Second World War, he rose to the rank of Air Marshal and held a succession of critical appointments: shaping the British Commonwealth Air Training Plan, serving as Deputy Chief of Air Staff, commanding Eastern Air Command during the pivotal years of the Battle of the Atlantic, and finishing the war as Air Officer Commanding-in-Chief of RCAF Overseas. His tenure at Eastern Air Command is widely regarded as instrumental in turning the tide against the German U-boat campaign in the Western Atlantic.

After retiring from the RCAF in 1947, Johnson settled in Vancouver, British Columbia, where he remained active in veterans' circles until his death in 1980.

== Military career ==
=== World War I service ===
Born in Woodstock, Ontario, in 1896, George Owen Johnson initially served as a subaltern with the Corps of School Cadet Instructors (CSCI) (now known as Cadet Instructors Cadre (CIC)) from 1913 to 1916. He was accepted for the Royal Naval Air Service (RNAS) in Canada, but transferred to the Royal Flying Corps before going overseas in May 1917. Serving with No. 84 Squadron RAF he became an ace with one aircraft destroyed, two shared aircraft destroyed, and three 'out of control'. Later, serving with No. 24 Squadron RAF, he was credited with one aircraft destroyed, one shared balloon destroyed, two 'out of control', and one shared aircraft captured including Leut. Kurt Wüsthoff. In total he was credited with 11 victories. He also crash landed three times.

He trained at No. 24 Training Squadron RFC and "A" Squadron Central Flying School RFC (now known as the Central Flying School), starting on 7 July 1917, graduating with 54 hours flight time, 38 hours 10 minutes of which was solo, on 27 September 1917, after an 85-day course of instruction.

He served as a fighter pilot in Royal Aircraft Factory S.E.5 aircraft (According to aviation author Robert Jackson, the S.E.5 was: "the nimble fighter that has since been described as the 'Spitfire of World War One'") on the Western Front—in No. 84 Squadron RAF, 22 October 1917 to 18 April 1918; in No. 24 Squadron RAF, 18 April to 19 June 1918. He was awarded the Military Cross (MC) and Croix de Guerre avec Etoile en Bronze.

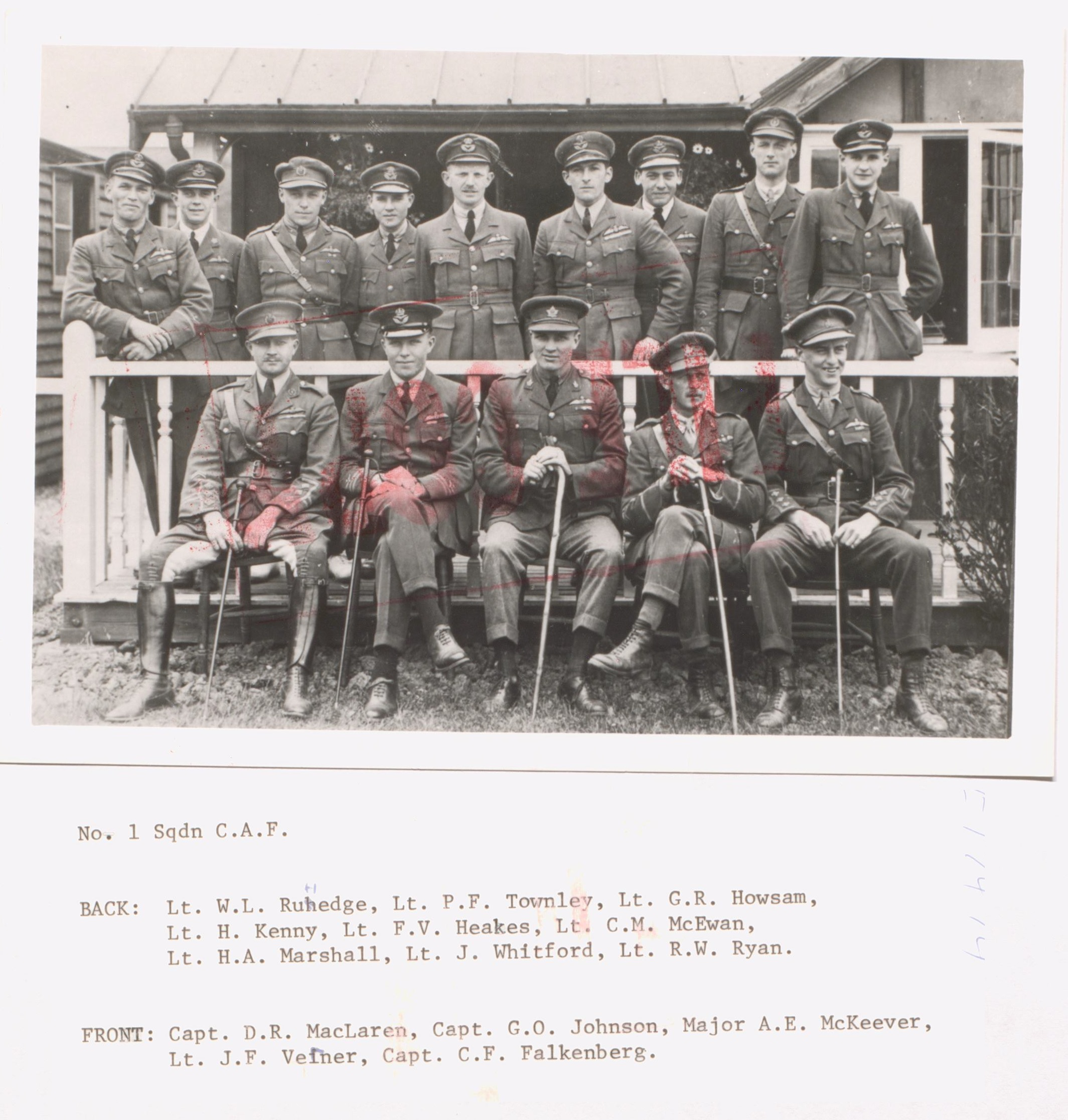
Personnel of No. 1 Squadron Canadian Air Force 1918-1920

His MC citation read in part:

"He has destroyed two hostile machines, has driven down two others out of control, and has always displayed the greatest courage and coolness in the most difficult situations."

=== Interwar years ===
In July 1919 he returned to Canada and was appointed officer commanding, War Trophy Party, Canada, July 1919 to January 1920. Working with a team of approximately fifty men he assembled enemy aircraft for (mostly static) display in Canada. Several of these aircraft remain on display in Canadian Museums, including an AEG G.IV, a Junkers J.I, and a Fokker D.VII.

He was commissioned as a flight lieutenant in the Canadian Air Force (1920–24) in 1920. (His service number was C4—just four).

He was appointed superintendent of Camp Borden (now known as CFB Borden), previously "the wartime home of the RAF Canada flying training scheme. It included machine-shops, schools, garages, offices, quarters and messes, a central heating plant, paved roads, a swimming pool, golf course, and tennis courts. Most important, there were eighteen hangars each able to house ten aircraft."

But when he arrived January 1920, he found the buildings deserted, except for a caretaker and his assistant. With a crew of 9 men, he set about assembling the aircraft of the Imperial Gift.

"Their task was to prepare the base to receive the gift aircraft then en route by sea from Britain. The first arrived by rail in mid-January, packed in cases weighing two to four tons. These were, Johnson reported, 'lifted from the cars by means of a differential chain tackle, lowered onto a sleigh and drawn into a hangar by horses. It was a very slow and tedious process involving a lot of heavy work but gradually better equipment was acquired. Drifting snow was a great handicap, for every morning it was necessary to cut a roadway through the drifts by hand so that the sleigh could get into a hangar. During the month of February the drifts were from eight to ten feet deep. The spring thaw slowed unpacking until the men, who had to open up quarters and kitchens between shipments, rigged a wheeled, team-drawn trailer to replace the sleighs. Hiring casual labour allowed the skilled mechanics to concentrate on assembling aircraft. All had been damaged in transit and needed careful attention before they could be flown, but Johnson had the first, an Avro 504, fitted with Curtiss snow skids and test-flew it himself early in March. Johnson tested each of the other machines as it was assembled, including four Airco DH.9As which were then shipped west for the first trans-Canada flight later that year."

He was part of the crew for the first trans Canada flight in October 1920, serving as navigator from Ottawa to Winnipeg. This leg of the flight was also the first crossing of Lake Superior by air.

He was then appointed to the permanent force, Royal Canadian Air Force, in April 1924 and was posted to RCAF Headquarters as Assistant Director of Air Staff and Personnel. In 1925, his service record noted that he was "Qualified as Certificate Examiner & authorized to carry out inspections and examinations of Air Harbours, Aircrafts [sic], Air Engineers and Private and Commercial Air Pilots"

He attended the Preparatory Staff College course at the Royal Military College in October 1926, and then the RAF Staff College from August 1927 to December 1928.

He was then appointed Commander Air Station Trenton (now known as CFB Trenton) for two years (1934–36). This coincided with the completion of No. 28 Unemployment Relief Project, with provision of an administration building, a seaplane hangar plus apron, a landplane hangar, a barrack block, ten married airmen's quarters, a married quarter for the station commanding officer, a senior warrant officers' quarter, roads, sidewalks, drainage, sewage, water supply and boost pump, and a surfaced parade ground. During his tenure, "It was also noted that eight relief personnel were employed to peel potatoes by hand and the base commander pointed out the waste, not only of labour but of the potatoes, involved in this method. He urged the provision of a mechanical peeler which he had earlier requisitioned without success. By obtaining the sympathetic ear of the Chief of General Staff, consideration was given to the early provision of a mechanical peeler.", demonstrating that issues of procurement are not new in the RCAF. His service record notes he completed the "Annual Musketry Course" in 1936.

He attended Imperial Defence College (1936–37) (now known as Royal College of Defence Studies), and in March 1938 was appointed first Commanding Officer of RCAF Western Air Command, based in Vancouver at the Jericho Beach Seaplane base.

Throughout this period he was involved in the expansion of civil and military aviation, the use of aircraft in the exploration and mapping of Canada, exploring their use in mining, forestry, forest fire fighting and the creation of national and international air mail service.

He said of his interwar service it "was attempting to make bricks without straw", referring to the meager government appropriations and constant lack of equipment.

=== British Commonwealth Air Training Plan ===
He was made Air Member for Organization and Training (October 1939) and began work on creating and executing the British Commonwealth Air Training Plan (BCATP). He presented the ‘Wings’ to the first graduating class under the BCATP at Camp Borden. During this period he was an early and enthusiastic supporter of the creation of the Royal Canadian Air Force Women's Division, although the idea did not become operational until July 1940.

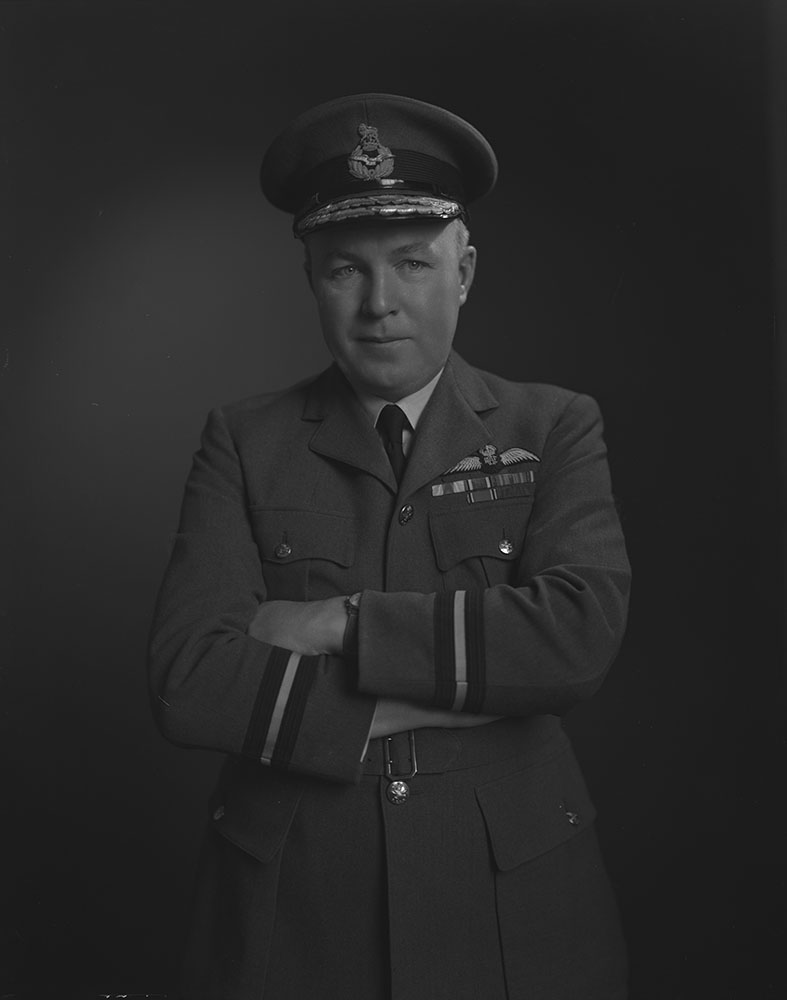
Air Commodore G.O. Johnson (1940)

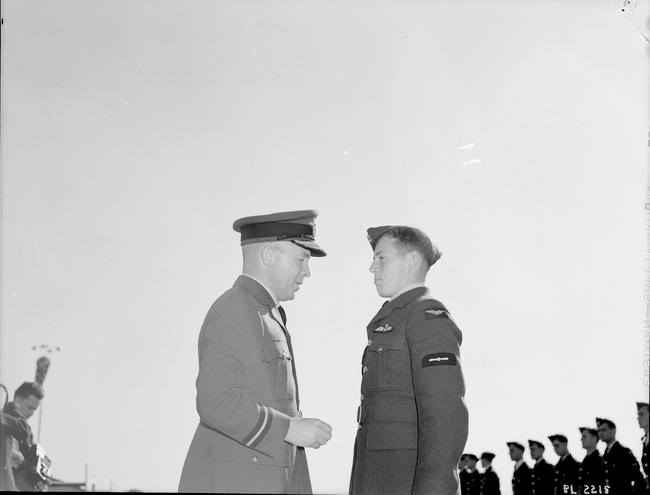
Air Commodore G. O. Johnson presents wings at Camp Borden, 30 September 1940

=== Deputy Chief of Air Staff ===
He then served as Deputy Chief of Air Staff (November 1940). In 1941, he was instrumental in framing and negotiating the agreement with the RAF that led to the creation of Canadian Air Groups (as opposed to just squadrons), allowing RCAF officers overseas staff command experience. In September 1941, he made a national broadcast on the Canadian Broadcasting Corporation updating Canadians on the progress and growth of the BCATP and the development of the Northwest Staging Route, the string of air stations used to supply Alaska and ferry aircraft to Russia. He was also instrumental in retaining Canadian command of Eastern Air Command, the Royal Canadian Air Force units patrolling the Western Atlantic. When "Admiral H.R. Stark, Chief of (US) Naval Operations in Washington, wrote to the Canadian Chief of Air Staff inviting him "to place such air forces as are assigned to perform ocean escort duty under the command, for this purpose only, of the Commander-in-Chief, U.S. Atlantic Fleet, this action to be taken under the authority and subject to the limitations contained in ABC-22...". The Canadian Cabinet War Committee felt that since the navy was obliged to accept American command for oceanic convoy work the RCAF ought to do so as well. The only objection that would be considered was one on operational grounds. The Deputy Chief of Air Staff, Air Vice-Marshal G.O. Johnson, therefore argued that since the RCAF now operated very successfully in co-operation with, rather than under the control of, the RN and RCN there was no need to adopt different relationships with the USN."

He was promoted to Acting Air Marshal while deputized for the Chief of the Air Staff during the Ottawa Conference held in May and June 1942 where he was in charge of the arrangements and the planning of material for discussion. The result of the conference was an extension of the British Commonwealth Air Training Plan to see it through the end of the war, and the entry of the Americans into the plan.

=== No. 1 Training Command ===
He was appointed AOC No.1 Training Command of the British Commonwealth Air Training Plan in July 1942. On 7 August 1942, his service record was amended to note he had been awarded the "Polish Air Force Pilots Badge"

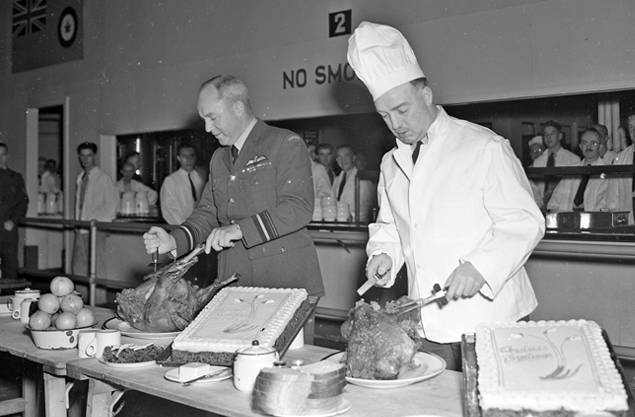
Johnson (left) and Group Captain McDonald serving airmen at Christmas dinner on 22 December 1942

=== Eastern Air Command and the Battle of the Atlantic ===
He then became AOC RCAF Eastern Air Command in January 1943. This time is widely considered the turning point in the Battle of the Atlantic when allied tactics and technology combined to turn the tide against the U-Boats. After taking command from AVM Cuffe, Johnson restructured relationships with the RCN and American forces, integrated new technology into the command (VLR Liberators, acoustic sonobuoys, homing torpedoes, enigma intercepts, radio direction finding sets, improved radars) to decisive effect. After the Atlantic Convoy Conference in spring 1943, he assumed "General Operational Control" in of all Allied Air Forces in the Canadian sector of the Western Atlantic, in a model considered a forerunner of the current Canadian/USA model of strategic cooperation. This was partly a result of Johnson's work both as DCAS RCAF and AOC EAC. "The creation of the Canadian Northwest Atlantic Command was a significant accomplishment in Canada’s military history. It marked the first time Canadian naval and Air Force commanders had commander in chief status in an active theatre of war." In August 1943, F/O Howes made the first trans-Atlantic patrol flight in a VLR Liberator closing the ‘air gap’. By late 1944 the 'Battle of the Atlantic' was considered won. Writing shortly after the war ended, Admiral Karl Dônitz noted that it was the "enemy air force" that was "the greatest problem for the U-boat command."

=== RCAF Overseas ===
He became AOC-in-C RCAF Overseas in April 1945, serving to July 1946. He was occupied with completing the plans to redeploy the RCAF component of the 'Tiger Force' from bases in Europe to the Pacific Theatre via Canada, where they were to refit and train for the new mission and "to oversee the repatriation of RCAF personnel and to administer the RCAF's thirteen-squadron contribution to the British Air Forces of Occupation (Germany)."

The RCAF Overseas had grown over the course of the war to 48 squadrons. While they made their best known contributions in the high-intensity operations over North-West Europe, where Canadian bomber squadrons formed no. 6 Group, Bomber Command, And RCAF Fighter squadrons served in Canadian wings, No. 417 Squadron flew fighters in North Africa and the Mediterranean, and three bomber squadrons operated from North Africa. Two transport squadrons and a maritime patrol squadron were in the South East Asia theatre based in Burma and Ceylon. An additional 47,000 RCAF personnel were serving in RAF squadrons around the world.

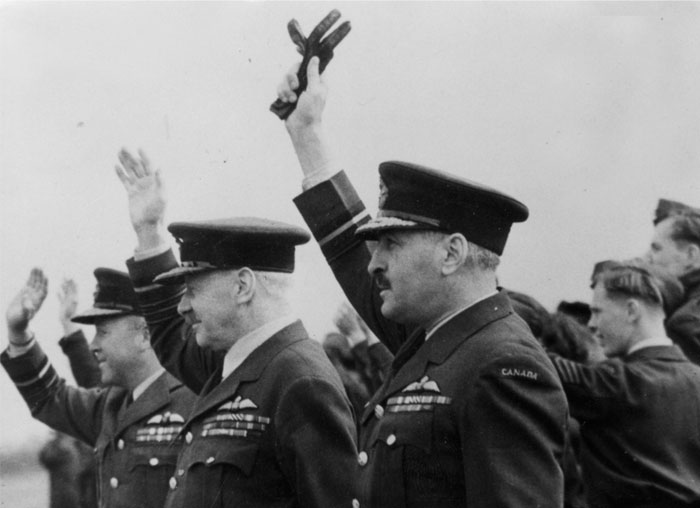
Waving off Tiger Force. At RAF Middleton St. George, RCAF Air Vice-Marshal Clifford Mackay "Black Mike" McEwen, commander of 6 Group (foreground), Air Vice-Marshal Arthur "Bomber" Harris (middle) and RCAF Air Marshal G.O. Johnson, AOC-in-C RCAF Overseas (background) wave goodbye to the first of 141 Canadian Lancasters departing for Canada

In his speech at the 'Waving off' ceremony for Tiger Force, Johnson said:

"You are now making history as the first British Squadrons to fly across the Atlantic as squadrons. This is an indication that in future wars, if wars come, the Canadian Air Force will fly to war as squadrons."

=== Decorations and retirement ===
He was awarded the Companion of the Bath (Military), the US Legion of Merit (Commander) and the French Légion d'honneur (Commandeur) as a result of his World War II service. He retired as Air Marshal in 1947, "Because he is not advantageously employable in his present rank".

His CB citation read in part:

"Air Vice Marshal Johnson, as Deputy Chief of the Air Staff, was responsible for the excellent planning and construction of the vast number of stations required for the successful operation of the British Commonwealth Air Training Plan as well as the increased Home War plans."

Hugh Halliday, the noted RCAF historian, quoted Johnson as saying "It should be clearly understood that Commanding Officers who recommend recognition of the work of their subordinates are much more highly thought of by superior formations than those who do not."

=== Personal life ===
Johnson married Jean Eleanor McKay (1894–1968) in 1924, and they had two children, Jean Margaret (1930–1995) and Doreen Eleanor (1933-2008). He married Sarah Jane ('Bobby') Roberts RRC (1896–1977) in 1969.

After living for some years post retirement in Florida, he returned to Canada in the 1960s and lived the remainder of his life in Vancouver, BC. He was always in attendance at the annual Remembrance Day Dawn Patrol breakfast held by the Air Force Officers' Association of Vancouver.

=== Legacy ===
There was a school named in his honour at the Royal Canadian Air Force base and training school in Summerside, Prince Edward Island. The Air Marshal Johnson School opened its doors in 1949 and served as an elementary school for the children of Canadian Forces personnel from Kindergarten through Grade VIII until the base was closed in 1989.

Some memorabilia and his medal set reside at the National Air Force Museum of Canada.

In October 2026, the Canadian Aviation Hall of Fame announced he would be inducted in 2027.

According to Air Marshal Robert Leckie:

"During Air Marshal Johnson's many senior appointments in the Royal Canadian Air Force, including his responsibilities in such positions as Deputy Chief of Air Staff, and Air Officer Commanding in Chief of Eastern Air Command and the Royal Canadian Air Force Overseas, he at all times was considered a brilliant leader and an inspiration to those with whom he came in contact."

Military offices
Preceded by J L Gordon	Senior Air Officer (RCAF) (Acting); 1933	Succeeded by G M Croil
Preceded by L S Breadner	Air Officer Commanding-in-Chief RCAF Overseas; 1945 – 1946	Post abolished
