= Lloyd Campbell (general) =

Canadian air force general (born 1947)

Lloyd Clarke Campbell
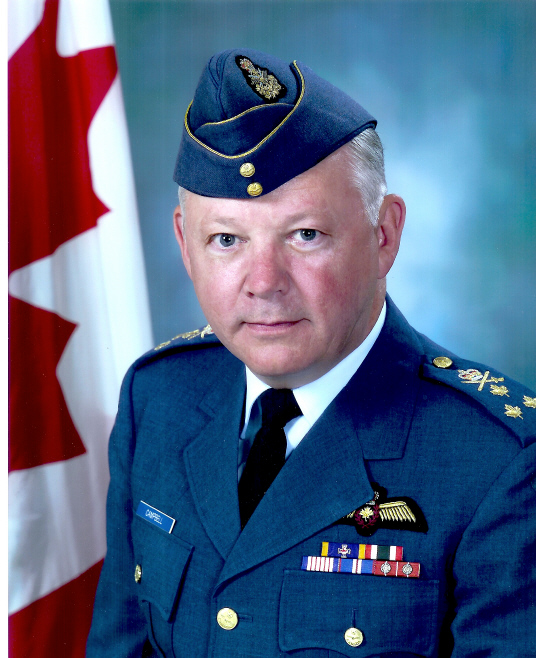
- Born: 1946 or 1947 (age 79–80)
- Military career
- Allegiance: Canada
- Branch: Air Command (Note: Known as Royal Canadian Air Force until 1968)
- Service years: 1965–2003
- Rank: Lieutenant-General
- Commands: 419 Tactical Fighter Training Squadron; 4 (Fighter) Wing / CFB Baden-Soellingen; 1 Canadian Air Division / Canadian NORAD Region; Air Command
- Awards: Commander of the Order of Military Merit; Canadian Forces' Decoration; Commander US Legion of Merit

Lieutenant-General Lloyd Clarke Campbell CMM, CD (born September 1947) is a retired Canadian air force general who was Chief of the Air Staff in Canada from 2000 to 2003.

== Career ==
Campbell joined the Royal Canadian Air Force in 1965 and trained initially as a navigator, then as a fighter pilot. During the NATO fighter weapons meet hosted at CFB Baden-Soellingen in 1974 he was declared NATO Top Gun. He served as Commanding Officer of 419 Tactical Fighter Training Squadron in Cold Lake, Alberta and by 1990 he was Assistant Chief of Staff (Plans and Policy) at Headquarters Allied Air Forces Central Europe. He became Commanding Officer of 4 Fighter Wing and Base Commander of CFB Baden-Soellingen in 1992, Director General Force Development at National Defence Headquarters in 1993 and then Director General Strategic Planning in 1995 before being appointed Commander 1 Canadian Air Division / Canadian NORAD Region in 1998. He went on to be Chief of the Air Staff in 2000 before retiring in 2003.

As of 2026, he was Chair of Perley Health, a geriatric care facility formerly run by the Department of Veterans Affairs.

== Honours ==
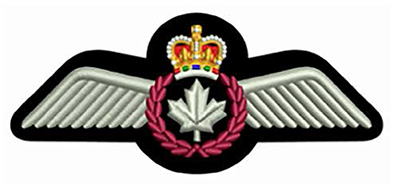

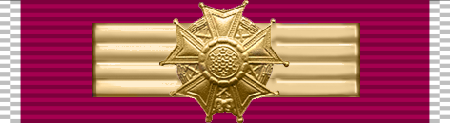

Ribbon	Description	Notes
	Order of Military Merit (CMM)	Commander; 29 May 1998
	Special Service Medal	With "NATO-OTAN" Clasp
	125th Anniversary of the Confederation of Canada Medal	7 May 1992
	Queen Elizabeth II Golden Jubilee Medal	Canadian Version of this Medal; 2002
	Queen Elizabeth II Diamond Jubilee Medal	Canadian Version of this Medal; 2012
	Canadian Forces' Decoration (CD)	With 2 Clasps; 38 years of Service in the RCAF
	Legion of Merit	Degree of Commander; 20 December 2003; Awarded by the United States of America

== Notes ==
Military offices
Preceded by George Macdonald	Commander of 1 Canadian Air Division; 1998–2000	Succeeded by Steve Lucas
Preceded by D N Kinsman	Chief of the Air Staff; 2000–2003	Succeeded by K R Pennie
