= Lloyd Samuel Breadner =

Canadian Chief of the Air Staff (1894–1952)

Lloyd Samuel Breadner CB DSC
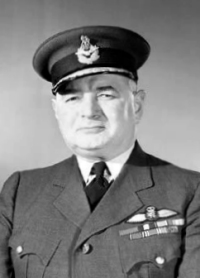
- Air Marshal Breadner in March 1945
- Born: 14 July 1894; Carleton Place, Ontario, Canada
- Died: 14 March 1952 (aged 57); Boston, Massachusetts, U.S.
- Military career
- Allegiance: Canada
- Branch: Royal Navy (Royal Naval Air Service); Royal Air Force; Canadian Air Force; Royal Canadian Air Force
- Service years: 1915 – 1945
- Rank: Air Chief Marshal
- Conflicts: World War I; World War II; Battle of Britain
- Awards: Companion of the Order of the Bath; Distinguished Service Cross

Air Chief Marshal (Note: This rank was used by the 20th century Royal Canadian Air Force and replaced with the rank of General in 1968 with the unification of the Canadian Forces, a rank which has been retained in the 21st century Royal Canadian Air Force. See Category:Canadian Forces Air Command generals Royal Canadian Air Force generals for such officers. Breadner was one of only two Canadian Air Chief Marshals, the other being Frank Robert Miller.) Lloyd Samuel Breadner CB, DSC (14 July 1894 – 14 March 1952) was a Canadian military pilot and Chief of the Air Staff during World War II.

== Early career ==
Breadner obtained his pilot's certificate at Wright Flying School and was commissioned in the British Royal Naval Air Service on 28 December 1915 as a flight sub-lieutenant. During World War I, he served on the Western Front as a fighter pilot in the No. 3 (Naval) Squadron. He was promoted to temporary flight lieutenant (RNAS) on 31 December 1916. He was awarded the Distinguished Service Cross on 23 May 1917. The citation read:

For conspicuous gallantry and skill in leading his patrol against hostile formations. He brought down three hostile machines and forced several others to land. On the 6th April, 1917, he drove down a hostile machine which was wrecked while attempting to land in a ploughed field. On the morning of the 11th April, 1917, he destroyed a hostile machine which fell in flames, brought down another in a spinning nose dive with one wing folded up, and forced a third to land.

— London Gazette

Breadner was confirmed in the substantive rank of flight lieutenant (acting flight commander) on 30 June 1917. During the winter of 1917–18, Squadron Commander Breadner and 3 (Naval) Squadron were posted to RAF Walmer. He was released from the RAF (Note: The RNAS had been joined with the Royal Flying Corps in 1918) with the rank of major (Note: The RAF used Army-style ranks until mid-1919.) in March 1919.

== Command ==
Following his demobilisation from the RAF, Breadner returned to Canada, briefly joining his father in business. His former commanding officer, James Stanley Scott, then Controller of Civil Aviation with the Air Board, requested his assistance, and in December 1920 Breadner was appointed an Air Certificate Examiner. On 10 June 1921, he received a regular commission as a squadron leader in the new Canadian Air Force. He became Controller of Civil Aviation in 1922.

On 15 January 1924, Breadner was appointed to command Camp Borden, with the temporary rank of wing commander. Upon the formation of the Royal Canadian Air Force (RCAF) on 1 April 1924, he was reappointed in his permanent rank of squadron leader, and was confirmed in his rank and seniority from 1 August 1925; he was then the sixth-most senior officer in the RCAF. He relinquished command of Camp Borden on 24 September 1925.

After attending RAF Staff College, he was promoted to the permanent rank of wing commander on 1 April 1927 and appointed Assistant Director of the RCAF (Air Staff Duties) on 16 August. On 15 February 1928, Breadner was appointed Director of the RCAF, holding the appointment until 29 April 1932. From 1932 until 1935, he commanded Trenton and then attended the Imperial Defence College. He was promoted to group captain on 1 February 1936, and to air commodore on 4 August 1938.

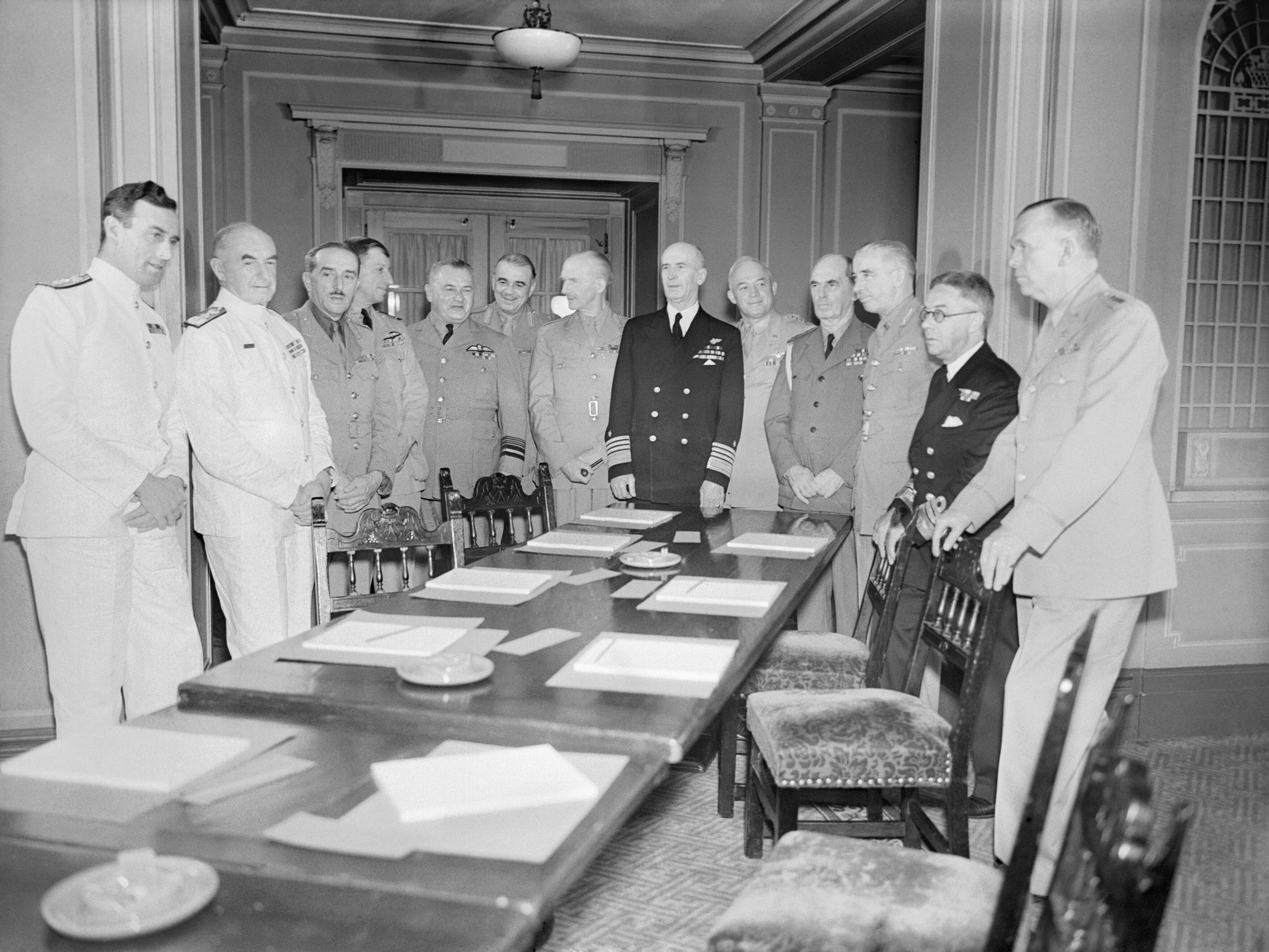
Breadner (fifth from left) at the Quebec Conference of 1943.

On 29 May 1940, he became Chief of Air Staff, in the rank of air vice-marshal. Promoted to air marshal on 19 November 1941, he became Air Officer Commanding-in-Chief RCAF Overseas in January 1944. Breadner was promoted on his retirement on 25 November 1945, to Air Chief Marshal, the first Canadian to hold this rank.

== Personal life ==
In 1917, Breadner married Mary Evelyn Story of Ottawa; the couple had three daughters (Doris, Joan Evelyn and Anne Elizabeth) and a son, Donald Lloyd. On 30 November 1944, Flying Officer Donald Lloyd Breadner was killed after an air gunnery exercise, while flying a de Havilland Mosquito from RCAF Station Debert in Nova Scotia.

Breadner's health declined in retirement, and in early 1952, having been diagnosed with high blood pressure, was ordered on medical grounds to spend the winter in Florida, where he had a stroke. He was being brought home on an RCAF transport when his condition became critical, forcing the flight to divert to Boston. Upon arrival, Breadner was taken to a Boston hospital, where he died.

== Awards ==
- 23 May 1917: Distinguished Service Cross
- 1 January 1943: Companion, Order of the Bath
- 25 October 1943: Military Cross, First Class (Belgium)
- 25 August 1944: Order of Polonia Restituta, 1st Class (Poland)
- 5 October 1946: Order of the White Lion, Class II (Czechoslovakia)
- 20 December 1946: Legion of Merit (Degree of Commander)
- 12 September 1947: Commander of the Legion of Honour (France)
- 12 June 1948: King Haakon VII's Cross of Liberty (Norway)

== References and notes ==
Notes

Citations

Bibliography

Military offices
Preceded by J S Scott	Director of the RCAF; 1928 – 1932	Succeeded by A A L Cuffe
Preceded by G M Croil	Chief of the Air Staff (RCAF); 1940 – 1943	Succeeded by R Leckie
Preceded by H Edwards	Air Officer Commanding-in-Chief RCAF Overseas; 1944 – 1945	Succeeded by G O Johnson
