= Albert Cuffe =

Canadian air marshal (1895–1969)

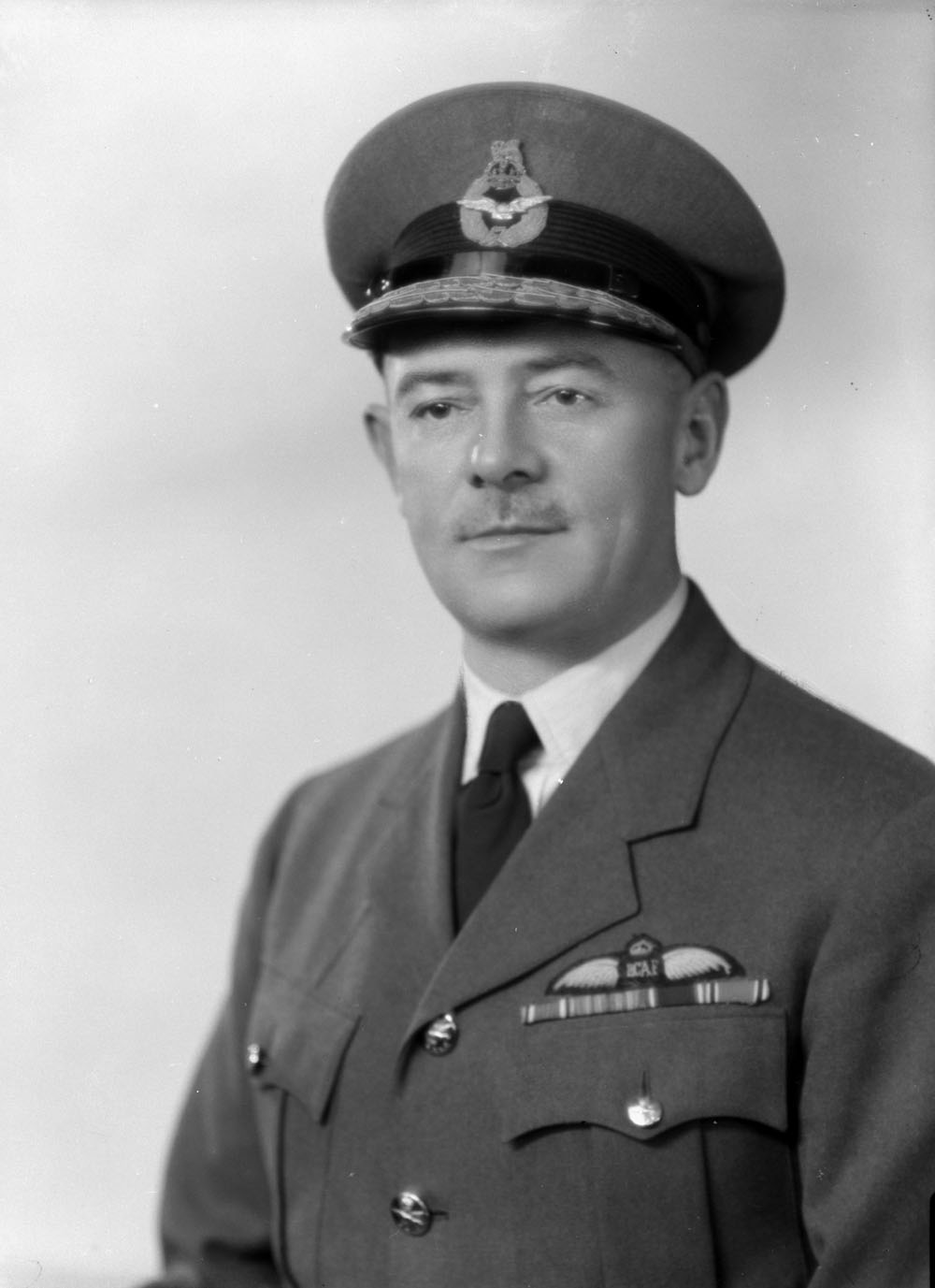
- Born: 2 May 1895; Kilasser, County Mayo, Ireland
- Died: 24 March 1969 (aged 73)
- Military career
- Allegiance: Canada
- Branch: (Canada) Royal Canadian Air Force
- Service years: 1914 – 1944
- Rank: Air Marshal
- Conflicts: World War I

Air Marshal Albert Abraham Lawson Cuffe (2 May 1895 – 24 March 1969) was a Canadian air force officer who was briefly Director of the Royal Canadian Air Force.

== Career ==
Cuffe enlisted in the Canadian Expeditionary Force in 1914 and, having joined the Royal Flying Corps, served in World War I. After the War he became an instructor at Camp Borden. He was responsible for forming No. 2 (Operations) Squadron at High River, Alberta on 1 April 1925. He served briefly as Director of the Royal Canadian Air Force in 1932 before, having been promoted to wing commander, he became Commanding Officer of No.4 Squadron at Vancouver around 1935. He served in World War II in initially as Air Member for Training and then, from February 1942, as Commander of the Eastern Air Command of the Royal Canadian Air Force. He retired in 1944.

Military offices
Preceded by L S Breadner	Director of the RCAF; 1932	Succeeded by J L Gordon
