= Alain Parent =

RCAF officer

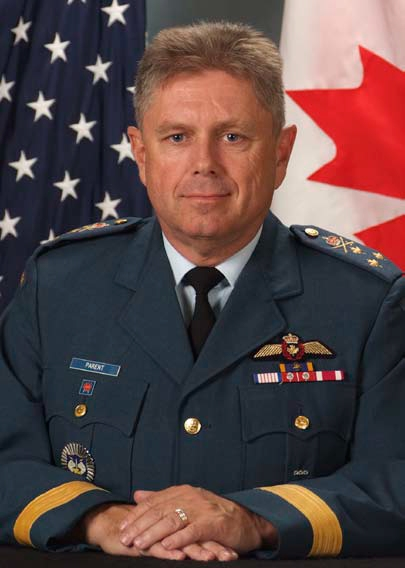
- Military career
- Branch: Royal Canadian Air Force (Note: Known as Air Command until 2011)
- Service years: 1979-2018
- Rank: Lieutenant General
- Commands: Vice Chief of the Defence Staff (acting)

Lieutenant General Joseph Alain Jacques Parent CMM CD is a retired senior Royal Canadian Air Force officer, who served as acting Vice Chief of the Defence Staff from May 2017 until his retirement in June 2018.

== Military career ==
Parent joined the Canadian Forces in 1979. Following certification of his pilot training in 1985, he flew a variety of Air Command helicopter and accrued over 4900 hours of flying on the CH-136 Kiowa, CH-135 Twin Huey and the CH-146 Griffon.

Parent became Commander of 1 Canadian Air Division in July 2011. He served as the Deputy Commander of North American Aerospace Defense Command (NORAD) from 2012 and was appointed acting Vice Chief of the Defence Staff on 30 May 2017.

== Personal life ==
He is married and has two children.

== Awards and decorations ==
Parent's personal awards and decorations include the following:

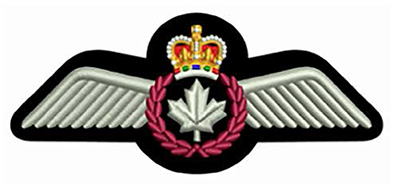

Ribbon	Description	Notes
	Order of Military Merit (CMM)	Appointed Commander (CMM) on 17 October 2012; Appointed Officer (OMM) on 28 November 2008
	125th Anniversary of the Confederation of Canada Medal	Decoration awarded in 1992
	Canadian Forces' Decoration (CD)	with two Clasp for 32 years of services
	Meritorious Service Medal	(United States)

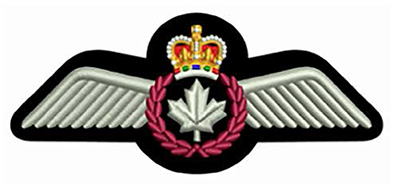
- He was a qualified RCAF Pilot and as such wore the RCAF Flight wings
- Command Commendation

== Notes ==
Military offices
Preceded by Thomas J. Lawson	Deputy Commander of the North American Aerospace Defense Command; 4 September 2012 – 1 July 2015	Succeeded by Pierre St-Amand
