= Scott Clements (general) =

Canadian general

- Born: 1940 or 1941 (age 84–85)
- Military career
- Allegiance: Canada
- Branch: Air Command (Note: Known as Royal Canadian Air Force until 1968)
- Service years: 1961–1995
- Rank: Lieutenant-General
- Commands: 434 Tactical Fighter Squadron; National Defence College; Air Command
- Awards: Commander of the Order of Military Merit; Canadian Forces' Decoration

Lieutenant-General George Scott Clements CMM, CD (born c. 1941) is a retired Canadian air force general who was Commander, Air Command in Canada from 1993 to 1995.

== Career ==
Clements joined the Canadian Air Force in 1961 and, after graduating from the Royal Military College of Canada, trained as a fighter pilot. He served as Commanding Officer of 434 Tactical Fighter Squadron in the mid 1970s. He went on to be Chief of Personnel Development at the National Defence Headquarters in 1989, Commander of the National Defence College in Kingston in 1991 and Commander, Air Command in 1993 before retiring in 1995.

In retirement he became President and Chief Executive Officer of the Edmonton Regional Airports Authority and then President and Chief Executive Officer of the Fort McMurray Airports Authority.

== Notes ==
Military offices
Preceded by D Huddleston	Commander, Air Command; 1993–1995	Succeeded by A M DeQuetteville
