= Thomas J. Lawson =

Royal Canadian Air Force general (born 1957)

General Thomas J. Lawson CMM CD
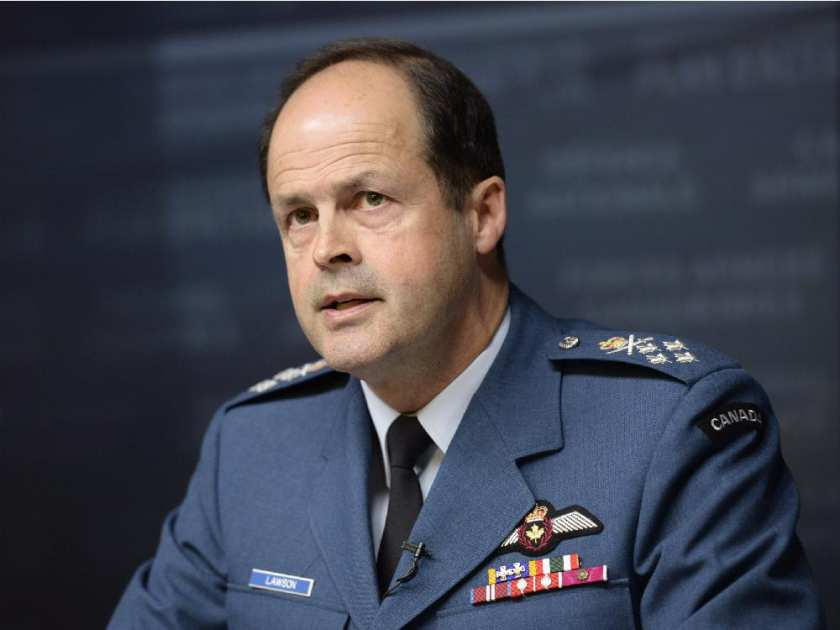
- General Lawson speaking to press
- Born: Thomas James Lawson; November 2, 1957 (age 68); Etobicoke, Ontario, Canada
- Spouse: Kelly Lawson
- Children: 3
- Military career
- Allegiance: Canada
- Branch: Royal Canadian Air Force (Note: Known as Air Command until 2011)
- Service years: 1975–2015
- Rank: General
- Commands: 412 Transport Squadron; CFB Trenton; Royal Military College of Canada; Chief of the Defence Staff
- Conflicts: Military intervention against ISIL
- Awards: Order of Military Merit; Canadian Forces' Decoration; Legion of Merit (U.S.)

General Thomas James Lawson (born November 2, 1957) is a retired Royal Canadian Air Force general. Lawson was Chief of the Defence Staff of the Canadian Armed Forces from October 2012 to July 2015. He previously served as Deputy Commander of the North American Aerospace Defence Command.

== Family and early life ==
Thomas James Lawson was born on November 2, 1957 in Etobicoke, Ontario. His father George Lawson (1920–2011) was a fighter pilot during World War II, flying Mustang and Spitfire aircraft in the fighter-reconnaissance role with 239 Squadron of the RAF and 414 Squadron of the RCAF. His grandfather, Norman Moran (1895–1973), was a fighter pilot during World War I, flying Sopwith Camels.

== Military career ==
=== Cadet officer ===
Lawson enrolled in the Canadian Armed Forces in 1975, attending the Royal Military College in Kingston. In 1976, he was awarded the Queen’s University Challenge Shield as the top First Year Cadet. While at RMC, Lawson was a member of the College swim and cross-country running teams. In 1978, he was selected to be the Cadet Wing Commander for his final year. In 1979, Lawson graduated with a Bachelor of Science in Engineering, majoring in Electrical Engineering. On graduation parade, he was awarded the Sword of Honour as top all-round graduate.

=== Junior officer ===
In 1980, following completion of training at CFB Moose Jaw, his father pinned on Lawson's wings during graduation parade making him a third-generation RCAF pilot. In 1981, Lawson completed fighter training on CF-5 and CF-104 aircraft at CFB Cold Lake. On completion of his CF-104 training, he was awarded the top graduate trophy. He was then posted to 421 Squadron at CFB Baden–Soellingen. During a four-year tour, Lawson gathered over 1000 hours on the Starfighter. He returned to Royal Military College in 1985 to complete a Master of Science in Engineering, specializing in Electrical Engineering, and then served as a lecturer with the Electrical Engineering department staff.

=== Senior officer ===
In 1988, Lawson was promoted to major and was posted to Montgomery, Alabama, to attend the United States Air Force Air Command and Staff College. While posted in Alabama, he completed a Master of Public Administration at Auburn University. In 1991, he was posted to CFB Cold Lake and completed CF-18 Hornet training, graduating with the Top Gun and Top Overall Graduate awards. He then returned to CFB Baden-Soellingen to fly operationally with 421 and 439 Squadrons. After the base closed, Lawson returned to CFB Cold Lake, joining 410 Squadron as a CF-18 instructor, where he was in charge of the annual Fighter Weapons Instructor Course.

Lawson was posted in 1996 to National Defence Headquarters as a career manager and promoted to lieutenant-colonel. In 1998, he was appointed commanding officer of 412 Squadron, where he flew the CC-144 Challenger until 2000. Lawson was placed in charge of career management for Air Command and he completed the United States Air Force Air War College.

In 2003, Lawson was promoted to colonel and held various staff positions with the Air Force before joining the CF Transformation Team in 2005 and leading the stand-up of the Strategic Joint Staff. In 2006, Lawson was posted to CFB Trenton and completed a year in command of that base also carrying out flying duties on the CC-150 Airbus.

=== General officer ===
In May 2007, Lawson was promoted to Brigadier-General and appointed Commandant of his alma-mater, the Royal Military College of Canada.

Lawson was promoted to major-general and appointed Assistant Chief of the Air Staff in September, 2009. While in this role, he represented the RCAF during Cabinet discussions leading to the early selection of the F-35 as Canada's next fighter jet. In this role, he said the Lockheed Martin F-35 Lightning II's stealth could help defend Canadian sovereignty, as Russian bombers would be faced with an "undetectable threshold". Lawson was again promoted in July 2011, to lieutenant-general and, on August 15, 2011, was appointed deputy commander of NORAD and posted to Colorado Springs.

On August 27, 2012, Prime Minister Stephen Harper announced the appointment of Lawson as Chief of the Defence Staff (CDS), replacing General Walter Natynczyk. In April, 2014, he oversaw the commencement of Operation Reassurance, Canada's military response to Russian aggression in Ukraine. In September, 2014, Lawson oversaw the deployment of Special Operations troops and RCAF units to Iraq and Kuwait in support of Operation Impact, the international coalition against ISIS. In the summer of 2015, Lawson oversaw preparations for Operation Unifier, Canada's contribution to NATO's training effort in Ukraine.

Lawson pinned wings on his eldest and youngest sons in 2008 and 2013. Upon receipt of their wings, they each became fourth-generation RCAF aircrew.

In 2014, in response to press reports of allegations of sexual misconduct in the Forces, General Lawson asked retired Supreme Court justice Marie Deschamps to carry out an investigation. In April 2015, her report was released to the public. In a June interview with Peter Mansbridge, Lawson agreed that sexual misconduct is an issue and will continue to be an issue because "we're biologically wired in a certain way and there will be those who believe it is a reasonable thing to press themselves and their desires on others. It's not the way it should be." While public reaction to his interview was mixed, some opposition party members and individuals on social media disagreed with his comment and called for Lawson's resignation. Lawson later defended his statement, but agreed that it was an "awkward characterization".

== Retirement and beyond ==
On July 17, 2015, Lawson was replaced as Chief of the Defence Staff of the Canadian Armed Forces by Lieutenant-General Jonathan Vance.

In 2016, Lawson commenced a career as a strategic consultant.

== Medals and decorations ==
Lawson's personal awards and decorations include the following:

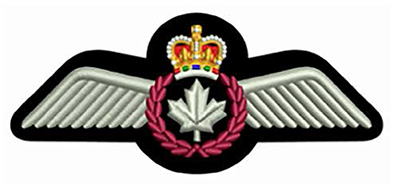

| Ribbon | Description | Notes |
| | Order of Military Merit (CMM) | Appointed Commander (CMM) on 18 February 2011; Appointed Officer (OMM) on 31 May 2007 |
| | Special Service Medal | with NATO-OTAN Clasp |
| | Queen Elizabeth II Diamond Jubilee Medal | Decoration awarded in 2012; Canadian version |
| | Canadian Forces' Decoration (CD) | with two Clasp for 32 years of service |
| | Legion of Merit (USA) | Decoration awarded 4 June 2015; Commander level; United States award |
| | Legion of Honour (French Republic) | Decoration awarded in 2016; Commandeur level; France award |
| | Order of the Crown of Thailand | Decoration awarded in 2017; Knight Grand Cross level; Thailand award |

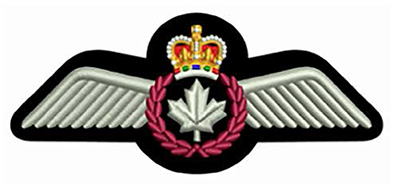
- He was a qualified RCAF Pilot and as such wore the Royal Canadian Forces Pilot Wings.

== Notes ==
Military offices
| Preceded by J. P. A. Deschamps | Assistant Chief of the Air Staff; 2009–2011 | Succeeded by J. Y. Blondin |
| Preceded by J. M. Duval | Deputy Commander of the North American Aerospace Defense Command; 15 August 2011 – August 2012 | Succeeded by J. A. J. Parent |
| Preceded by W. J. Natynczyk | Chief of the Defence Staff; October 2012 – July 2015 | Succeeded by Jonathan Vance |
