= Commander of the Royal Canadian Air Force =

Institutional head of the Royal Canadian Air Force

Commander of the Royal Canadian Air Force and Chief of the Air Force Staff
- Commandant de l'Aviation royale canadienne
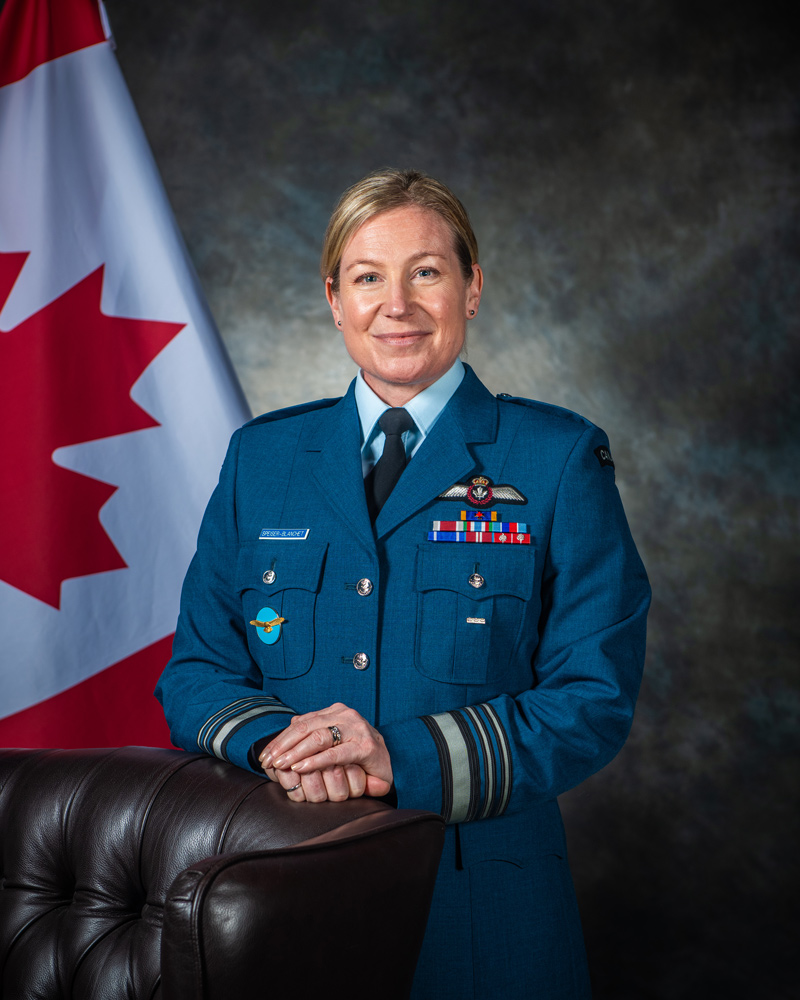
- Incumbent; Lieutenant-General Jamie Speiser-Blanchet since 10 July 2025
- Royal Canadian Air Force
- Type: Commissioned officer
- Status: Currently constituted
- Abbreviation: CRCAF
- Reports to: Chief of the Defence Staff
- Seat: National Defence Headquarters, Ottawa, Ontario
- Term length: At His Majesty's pleasure
- Formation: 1914
- First holder: Ernest Lloyd Janney
- Deputy: Deputy Commander of the Royal Canadian Air Force
- Website: Official website

Commander of the Royal Canadian Air Force (French: Commandant de l'Aviation royale canadienne) is the title of the institutional head of the Royal Canadian Air Force. This appointment also includes the title of Chief of the Air Force Staff (C Air Force; French: Chef d'état-major de la Force aérienne, CEMFA) and is based at National Defence Headquarters in Ottawa, Ontario.

== History of the position ==
With the creation of the Canadian Aviation Corps in 1914, a provisional commander was appointed. This small and short-lived organization was dissolved in 1915 and it was not until 1918 that the Canadian Air Force came into being under the authority of its Officer Commanding. The Canadian Air Force was reconstituted in 1920 and the officer in command (Air Commodore Tylee) held the title of Air Officer Commanding. It was also from 1920 to 1922 that Air Vice-Marshal Sir Willoughby Gwatkin served as Inspector-General of the Canadian Air Force although formally command was held by Tylee. Tylee's successors, not being air officers, only held the title of Officer Commanding. In 1922, the senior Air Force post was redesignated as the Director and in 1924, when the Canadian Air Force was granted its Royal prefix, the officer appointed to command the Air Force continued to hold the title of Director.

From 1932 to 1938 the title of Senior Air Officer was used. In late 1938, the Air Force became an independent service and its professional head was retitled Chief of the Air Staff, bringing the Canadian higher command arrangements and nomenclature into line with that of the British and Australian air forces. The title of Chief of the Air Staff was used throughout World War II and well into the Cold War years. However, in 1964, the post was abolished as part of a plan to integrate the Canadian Forces and authority over aviation units was no longer vested in a single post. Air Defence Command and Air Transport Commands continued as before but with no overall air commander, while the Canadian Air Division, Air Training and Air Materiel were all divided up between Mobile and Maritime Commands. This arrangement was eventually judged to be impractical and in 1975 the air units of the Canadian Forces were placed within Air Command under the authority of a lieutenant-general with the title Commander of Air Command. In 1997 the Commander of Air Command was re-designated the Chief of the Air Staff, a title which continued in use until 2011. In 2011 Air Command was renamed the Royal Canadian Air Force at which time the appointment was renamed to its present incarnation.

== Evolution of the position ==
Dates	Title	Rank(s) held	Air service
1914–1915	Provisional Commander	Captain	Canadian Aviation Corps
1918–1920	Officer Commanding	Lieutenant Colonel	Canadian Air Force (first creation)
1920–1922	Air Officer Commanding; Officer Commanding	Air Commodore; Wing Commander	Canadian Air Force (second creation)
1922–1924	Director	Wing Commander	Canadian Air Force (second creation)
1924–1932	Director	Squadron Leader to Group Captain	Royal Canadian Air Force (first creation)
1932–1938	Senior Air Officer	Wing Commander to Air Vice-Marshal	Royal Canadian Air Force (first creation)
1938–1964	Chief of the Air Staff	Air Vice-Marshal to Air Marshal	Royal Canadian Air Force (first creation)
1964–1975	no single air commander	not applicable	no single air power organization
1975–1997	Commander	Lieutenant-General	Air Command
1997–2011	Chief of the Air Staff	Lieutenant-General	Air Command
2011–	Commander of the Royal Canadian Air Force and Chief of the Air Force Staff	Lieutenant-General	Royal Canadian Air Force (second creation)

== Appointees ==
The following table lists all those who have held the post of Commander of the Royal Canadian Air Force or its preceding positions. Ranks and honours are as at the completion of their tenure:

No.	Portrait	Name	Took office	Left office	Time in office
Provisional Commander
1	E.L. Janney	Captain; E.L. Janney (1893–1941)	1914	1915	0–1 years
Officer Commanding
1	W.A. Bishop	Lieutenant-Colonel; W.A. Bishop (1894–1956)	1918	1918	0 years
Air Officer Commanding
1	A.K. Tylee	Air Commodore; A.K. Tylee (1887–1961)	1920	1921	0–1 years
Officer Commanding
1	R.F. Redpath	Wing Commander; R.F. Redpath (1888–1970)	1921	1921	0 years
2	J.S. Scott	Wing Commander; J.S. Scott (1889–1975)	1921	1922	0–1 years
Director
1	J.L. Gordon	Wing Commander; J.L. Gordon (1892–1940)	1922	1924	1–2 years
2	W.G. Barker	Wing Commander; W.G. Barker (1894–1930)	1924	1924	0 years
3	J.S. Scott	Group Captain; J.S. Scott (1889–1975)	1924	1928	3–4 years
4	L.S. Breadner	Wing Commander; L.S. Breadner (1894–1952)	1928	1932	3–4 years
5	A.A.L. Cuffe	Squadron Leader; A.A.L. Cuffe (1895–1969)	1932	1932	0 years
Senior Air Officer
1	J.L. Gordon	Group Captain; J.L. Gordon (1892–1940)	1932	1933	0–1 years
2	G.O. Johnson	Wing Commander; G.O. Johnson (1896–1980)	1933	1933	0 years
3	G.M. Croil	Air Vice Marshal; G.M. Croil (1893–1959)	1934	1938	3–4 years
Chief of the Air Staff
1	G.M. Croil	Air Vice Marshal; G.M. Croil (1893–1959)	15 December 1938	1940	1–2 years
2	L.S. Breadner	Air Marshal; L.S. Breadner (1894–1952)	1940	1943	2–3 years
3	R. Leckie	Air Marshal; R. Leckie (1890–1975)	1944	1947	2–3 years
4	W.A. Curtis	Air Marshal; W.A. Curtis (1893–1977)	1947	1953	5–6 years
5	C.R. Slemon	Air Marshal; C.R. Slemon (1904–1992)	1953	1957	3–4 years
6	H.L. Campbell	Air Marshal; H.L. Campbell (1908–1987)	1957	1962	4–5 years
7	C.R. Dunlap	Air Marshal; C.R. Dunlap (1908–2003)	1962	1964	1–2 years
Commander of Air Command
1	W.K. Carr	Lieutenant-General; W.K. Carr (1923–2020)	1975	1978	2–3 years
2	G.A. MacKenzie	Lieutenant-General; G.A. MacKenzie (1931–2012)	1978	1980	1–2 years
3	K.E. Lewis	Lieutenant-General; K.E. Lewis (c.1929–1992)	1980	1983	2–3 years
4	P.D. Manson	Lieutenant-General; P.D. Manson (1934–2023)	1983	1985	1–2 years
5	D.M. McNaughton	Lieutenant-General; D.M. McNaughton (born 1934)	1985	1986	0–1 years
6	L.A. Ashley	Lieutenant-General; L.A. Ashley (born 1937)	1986	1988	1–2 years
7	F.R. Sutherland	Lieutenant-General; F.R. Sutherland (born 1942)	1989	1991	1–2 years
8	D. Huddleston	Lieutenant-General; D. Huddleston	1991	1993	1–2 years
9	G.S. Clements	Lieutenant-General; G.S. Clements (born c.1941)	1993	1995	1–2 years
10	A.M. DeQuetteville	Lieutenant-General; A.M. DeQuetteville	1995	1998	1–2 years
Chief of the Air Staff
1	D.N. Kinsman	Lieutenant-General; D.N. Kinsman (born c.1945)	1 April 1998	21 July 2000	2 years, 111 days
2	L.C. Campbell	Lieutenant-General; L.C. Campbell (born c.1947)	21 July 2000	18 July 2003	2 years, 362 days
3	K.R. Pennie	Lieutenant-General; K.R. Pennie (born c.1949)	18 July 2003	16 May 2005	1 year, 302 days
4	J.S. Lucas	Lieutenant-General; J.S. Lucas (born 1952)	16 May 2005	26 July 2007	2 years, 71 days
5	A. Watt	Lieutenant-General; A. Watt	26 July 2007	1 October 2009	2 years, 67 days
6	A. Deschamps	Lieutenant-General; A. Deschamps	1 October 2009	2011	1–2 years
Chief of the Air Force Staff and Commander of the Royal Canadian Air Force
1	A. Deschamps	Lieutenant-General; A. Deschamps	2011	27 September 2012	0–1 years
2	Y. Blondin	Lieutenant-General; Y. Blondin	27 September 2012	9 July 2015	2 years, 285 days
3	M J Hood	Lieutenant-General; M J Hood (born 1967)	9 July 2015	4 May 2018	2 years, 299 days
4	A D Meinzinger	Lieutenant-General; A D Meinzinger	4 May 2018	12 August 2022	4 years, 100 days
5	Eric Kenny	Lieutenant-General; Eric Kenny	12 August 2022	10 July 2025	4 years, 26 days
6	Jamie Speiser-Blanchet	Lieutenant-General; Jamie Speiser-Blanchet	10 July 2025	Incumbent	1 year, 59 days

== See also ==
- Chief of the Defence Staff, the second most senior member of the Canadian Armed Forces after the Commander-in-Chief
- Commander of the Royal Canadian Navy, the institutional head of the Royal Canadian Navy.
- Commander of the Canadian Army, the institutional head of the Canadian Army.
