= Michael Hood =

Canadian air force officer (born 1967)

Michael J. Hood
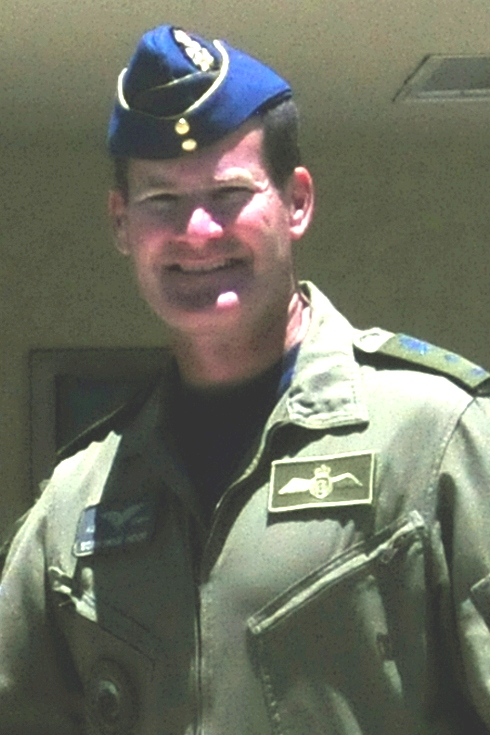
- Lieutenant General Michael Hood; Official RCAF Photo, 2015
- Military career
- Allegiance: Canada
- Branch: Royal Canadian Air Force (Note: Known as Air Command until 2011)
- Service years: 1985 - 2018
- Rank: Lieutenant General
- Commands: 429 Tactical Airlift Squadron; 436 Tactical Airlift Squadron; 8 Wing Trenton; Royal Canadian Air Force
- Awards: Commander of the Order of Military Merit

Lieutenant-General Michael John Hood CMM CD is a retired senior Royal Canadian Air Force officer who was Commander of the Royal Canadian Air Force from 2015 until 2018.

== Early life and education ==
In addition to holding a master's degree in International Relations from Auburn University, Hood also holds certifications from Canada's National Security Program and the United States' Air Force Command and Staff College.

== Career ==
Hood joined the Canadian Armed Forces in 1985. He earned his Air Combat Systems Officer Wings in 1988. Most of his flight career was spent on the C-130 Hercules. Hood also served a tour as an Electronic Warfare Officer on the CC-144 Challenger.

After serving as Commanding Officer of both 429 Tactical Airlift Squadron and 436 Tactical Airlift Squadron, he became Plans Officer at Canadian Expeditionary Force Command Headquarters in January 2006. Following this, he became Commander of 8 Wing Trenton in June 2007.

Hood went on to become Director General Air Force Development in 2010, Deputy Director General of International Security Policy in June 2011 and Deputy Commander of the Royal Canadian Air Force in September 2012. After that he became Director of Staff of the Strategic Joint Staff in June 2013 and finally Commander of the Royal Canadian Air Force in July 2015. He retired from the Canadian Armed Forces in May 2018.

== Post-retirement ==
Following his career in the military, in 2018 Hood went on to become an executive in a Vancouver-based energy and mining firm.

In May 2020, Hood wrote an op-ed in the National Post entitled "Securing Canadian sovereignty in a post-COVID world."

== Awards and decorations ==
As witness the photograph by the Toronto Star, Hood had received as of his appointment to RCAF Commander in July 2015 the following Orders and Decorations:

Ribbon	Description	Notes
	Order of Military Merit (CMM)	Appointed Commander (CMM) on 17 October 2012
	Gulf and Kuwait Medal	1991, with Clasp
	General Service Medal	2004 Afghanistan
	Special Service Medal	with NATO-OTAN Clasp; With Humanitas Clasp
	Canadian Peacekeeping Service Medal	
	NATO Medal for the former Yugoslavia	with FORMER YUGOSLAVIA clasp
	Canadian Forces' Decoration (CD)	with two Clasp for 32 years of services
	Order of Aeronautical Merit (Brazil)	Decoration awarded on 27 May 2017; Degree of Grand Officer; (Brazil)
	Legion of Merit (USA)	Decoration awarded on 1 August 2020; Commander level; (United States)

- He was a qualified RCAF Air Combat Systems Officer and as such wore the Royal Canadian Air Forces Air Combat systems Officer badge.

== Notes ==
Military offices
Preceded by J Y Blondin; As Assistant Chief of the Air Staff	Deputy Commander of the Royal Canadian Air Force; September 2012 – May 2013	Succeeded by Richard Forster
Preceded by J Y Blondin	Commander of the Royal Canadian Air Force; July 2015 – April 2018	Succeeded by Al Meinzinger
