= Al Meinzinger =

Royal Canadian Air Force commander from 2018 to 2022

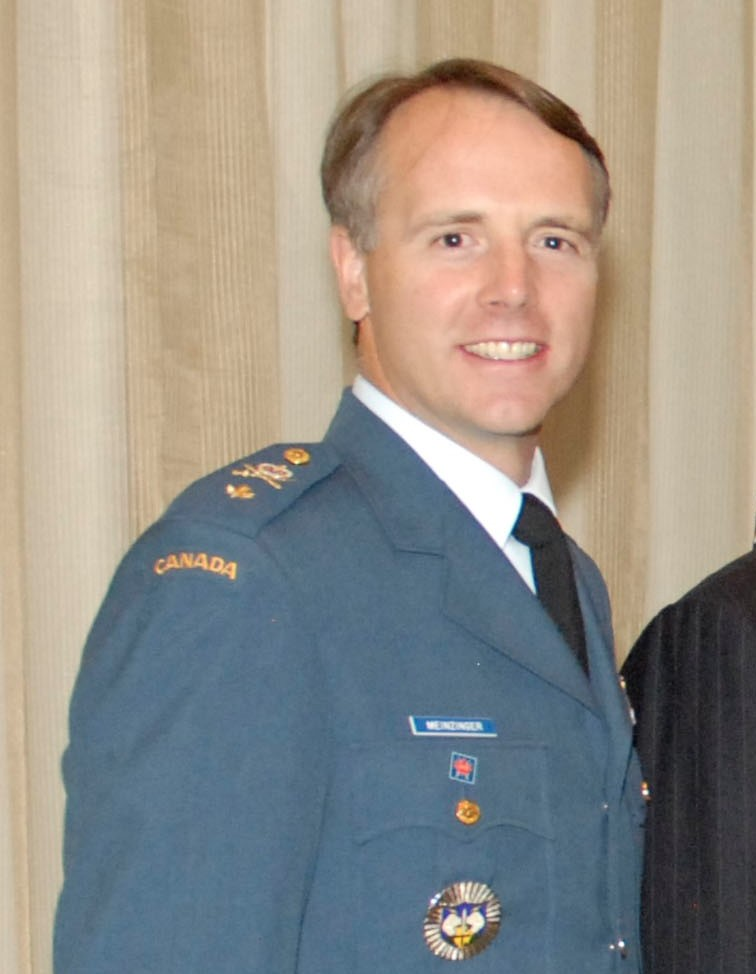
- Meinzinger in 2013
- Military career
- Allegiance: Canada
- Branch: Royal Canadian Air Force (Note: Known as Air Command until 2011.)
- Service years: 1985–2022
- Rank: Lieutenant General
- Commands: Commander of the RCAF; Commandant of the RMC; 403 Squadron, RCAF
- Awards: Commander of the Order of Military Merit; Meritorious Service Medal; Canadian Forces' Decoration

Lieutenant-General Alexander Donald Meinzinger CMM MSM CD is a retired senior Royal Canadian Air Force officer who was Commander of the Royal Canadian Air Force from 2018 until 2022.

== Career ==
Meinzinger joined the Canadian Forces in 1985 through the Regular Officer Training Plan where he received a Bachelor of Arts Honours degree in Economics and Commerce from the Royal Military College of Canada. After serving as commander of 403 (Helicopter) Operational Training Squadron, he was deployed to Afghanistan as commander of Canada's Joint Task Force Afghanistan Air Wing in 2011. He went on to be Deputy Director of Strategy, Policy and Plans at North American Aerospace Defense Command / United States Northern Command in June 2012, commandant of the Royal Military College of Canada in July 2013 and Deputy Commander of the Royal Canadian Air Force in May 2015. After that he became Director of Staff, Strategic Joint Staff in March 2017 and Commander of the Royal Canadian Air Force in May 2018. Meinzinger retired from the Canadian Armed Forces in August 2022.

== Military awards ==
1st row; 2nd row; 3rd row; 4th row
1st row	Royal Canadian Air Force Pilot Flying Badge		
2nd row	Commander of the Order of Military Merit	Meritorious Service Cross (Military Division)	
3rd row	General Campaign Star: South-West Asia	Canadian Peacekeeping Service Medal	Mission in Haiti Medal
4th row	Queen Elizabeth II Diamond Jubilee Medal	Canadian Forces' Decoration with 2 Clasps (32 years)	Legion of Merit (Officer)

== Notes ==
Military offices
Preceded by Michael Hood	Commander of the Royal Canadian Air Force; May 2018 – August 2022	Succeeded by Eric Kenny
