= Canada and the 2026 Iran war =

The Canadian government has officially abstained from joining in the 2026 Iran war. The Canadian government has prioritized diplomatic solutions to end the international crisis, a strategy supported by the Canadian public that is weary of deploying Canadian peacekeepers or being directly involved in any military offensives. Domestically, the Iran conflict has raised energy prices and inflation in Canada. This has led to elevated transportation costs and food prices.

There has been debate within Canada if it would be willing to help its NATO allies in defence of Gulf states, or assist with the stabilization of the strait of Hormuz. Questions have arisen regarding the involvement of Canadian exchange officers in planning and intelligence, and why the presence of Canadian soldiers at sites attacked by Iran was not disclosed to the public.

Although Canada has previously been involved in joint operations with the U.S. in regards to Iran, most notably the 1979/80 Canadian Caper, Canada has long been reluctant to participate in military interventions that are lacking UN Security Council approval. Diplomatic relations between Canada and Iran are basically non existent, with a lack of formal diplomatic ties since 2012. Canada has placed sanctions on Iran since 2010, and has pursued legal action against Iran through the International Court of Justice regarding the 2020 downing of Flight PS752.

== Foreign relations context ==
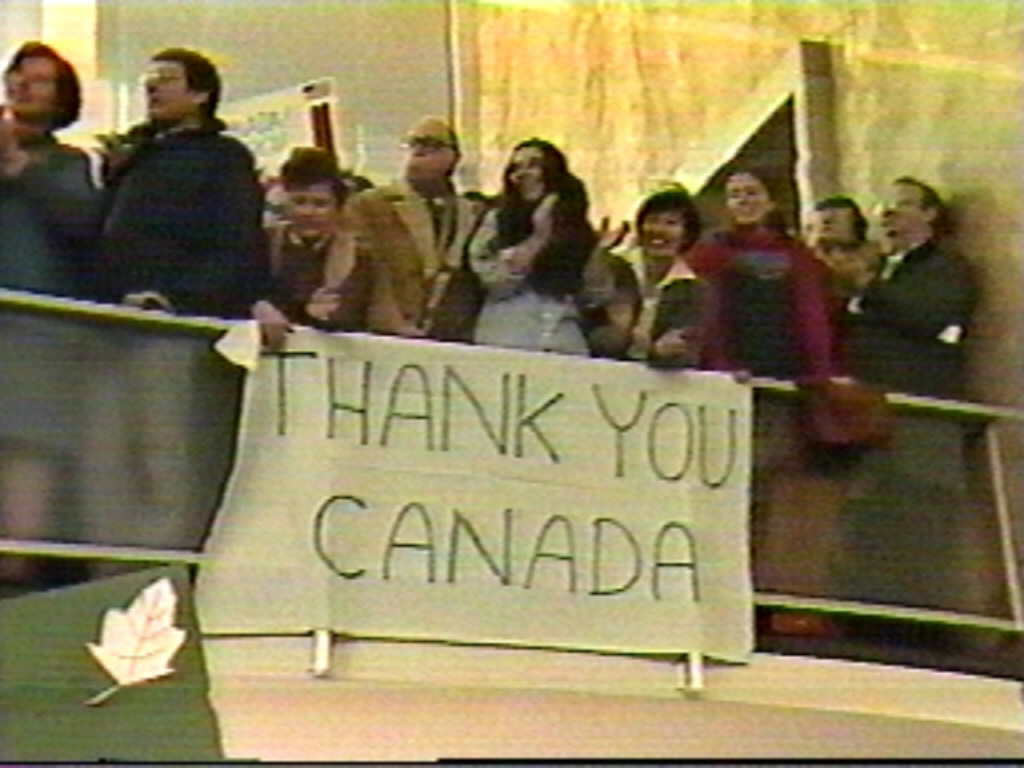
Americans grateful for Canadian aid in sheltering and rescuing American diplomats during the Iran hostage crisis called the "Canadian Caper", 1980.

Canada and the United States have a long and complex relationship; historically close allies, they co-operate regularly on military campaigns and intelligent exchange; the Canadian Caper was a covert joint operation which Canadian diplomats sheltered and evacuated six American diplomats who had escaped the initial seizure of the U.S. Embassy in Tehran during the Iran hostage crisis. This event significantly strained Canadian-Iranian relations while highlighting the close alliance between Canada and the U.S. Notwithstanding, Canada has long been reluctant to participate in U.S.-led military operations that are not sanctioned by the United Nations, such as the Vietnam War or the 2003 Invasion of Iraq.

Diplomatic relations between the United States and Canada have recently been strained since a trade war involving the United States began on 1 February 2025, when U.S. president Donald Trump signed orders imposing tariffs on goods entering the United States, alongside rhetoric suggesting the annexation of Canada.

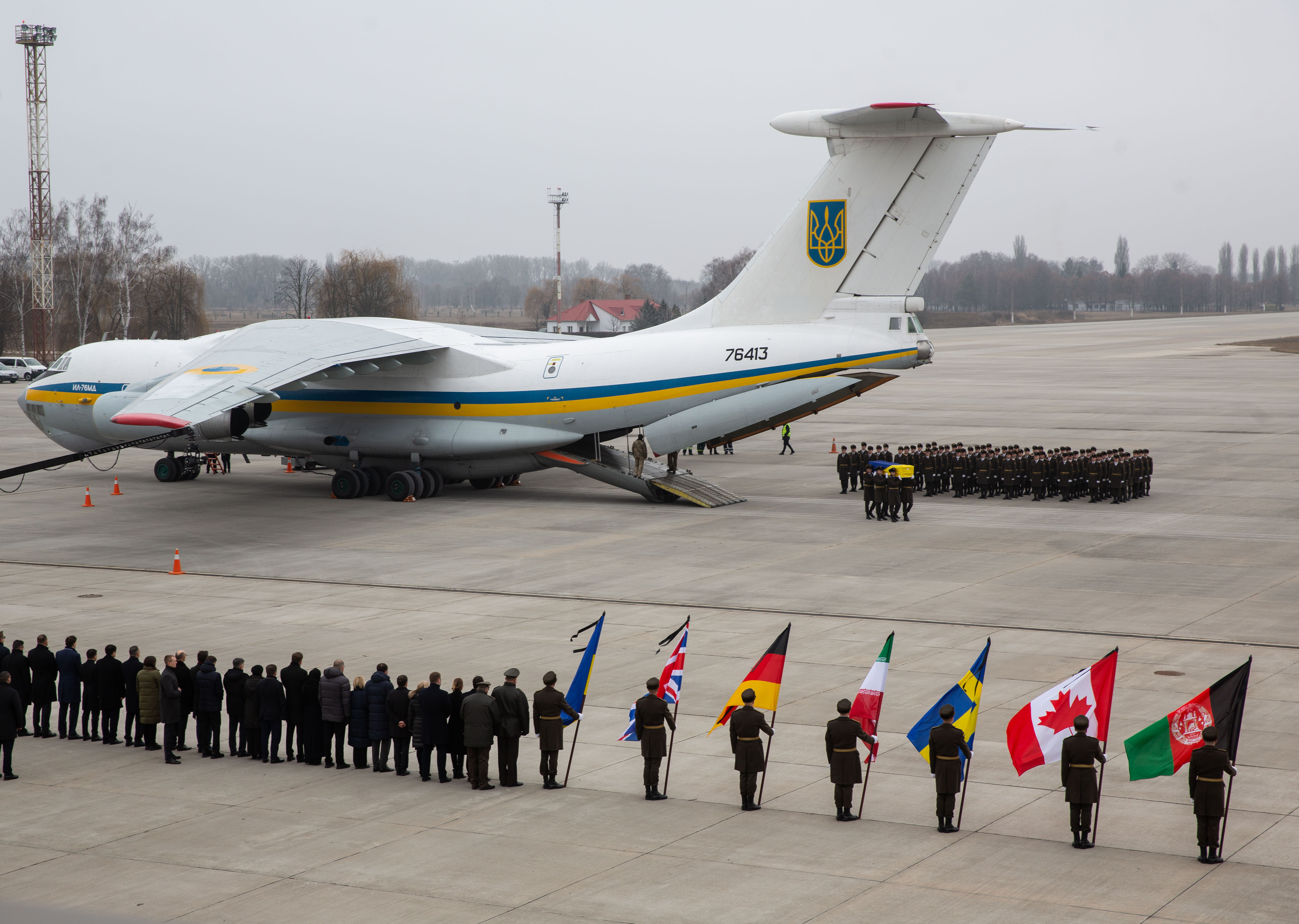
Commemoration of the victims of Ukraine International Airlines Flight 752 that was shot down

Canada has not had a formal diplomatic presence in Iran since 2012, with the Canadian government stating in 2026 that restoration of ties would require a change in the Iranian regime. Canada has imposed significant, autonomous sanctions on Iran for over 15 years, with the first "Made-in-Canada" sanctions established in July 2010, and the newest sanctions implemented in early 2026.

On 8 January 2020, a Boeing 737-800 was shot down by the Islamic Revolutionary Guard Corps (IRGC) shortly after take off killing all 176 occupants on board, including 57 Canadians. Canada has sought legal action against Iran through the International Court of Justice "in pursuit of accountability and full reparation". In June 2024, Canada officially designated the IRGC as a terrorist organization under the Canadian Criminal Code. In response to the designation, the Iranian government officially designated the Royal Canadian Navy as a terrorist organization in late December 2025.

In March 2026, Canadian Prime Minister Mark Carney and Foreign Affairs Minister Anita Anand stated Canada supports efforts preventing Iran from obtaining nuclear weapons but expressed regret over certain U.S.-strikes that appeared inconsistent with international law.

At the outbreak of the war, opposition leader and Conservative party leader Pierre Poilievre released a statement which expressed support for the Iranian protesters, support for preventing Iran from obtaining nuclear weapons, and support for the actions taken by the United States, Israel, and the Gulf States against the Iran regime.

== Official position ==
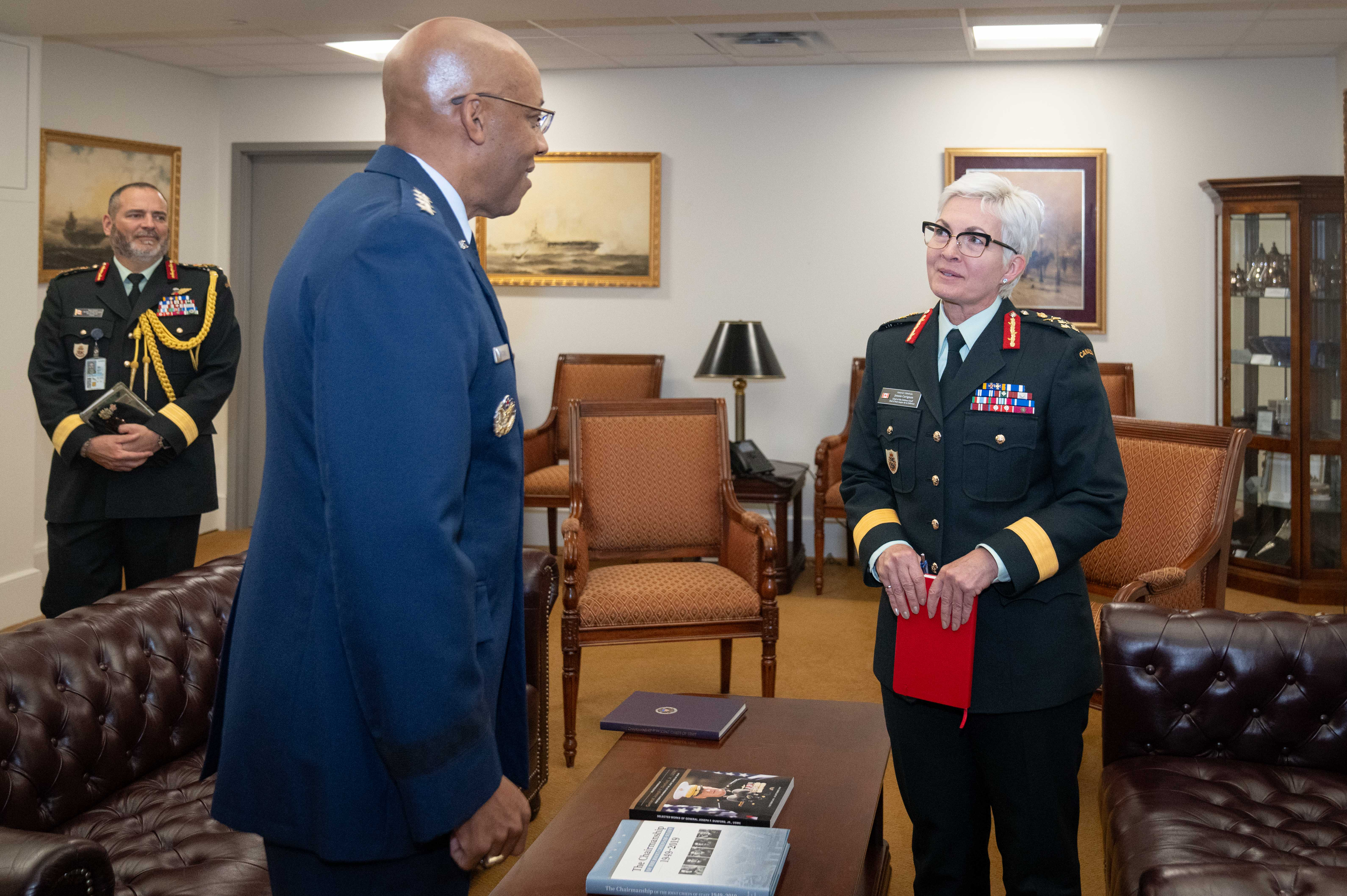
Gen. Jennie Carignan, Chief of the Defence Staff, Canadian Armed Forces, at the Pentagon, October 2024

On 3 March 2026, during a visit to Australia, Canadian Prime Minister Mark Carney described the war as a "failure of the international order" and claimed that the United States had not consulted its allies before striking Iran. The following day, Carney stated that Canada would not rule out military involvement in the 2026 Iran war and that Canada "will stand by our allies, when it makes sense." This was followed by Chief of the Defence Staff General Jennie Carignan stating that Canada "may be called on to help defend Persian Gulf states from Iran's strikes" and that the situation in the Gulf states is "quite dire and dangerous."

On 9 March 2026, Canadian defence minister David McGuinty stated that Canada "will not be participating" in the war despite Carney's prior comments about not ruling out military involvement. Carney stated the following day that Canada "is not participating in the United States and Israeli offensive and will never participate in it."

On 19 March 2026, Carney stated that Canada was willing "to contribute to efforts to reopen the Strait of Hormuz." On that same day, Canadian defence minister David McGuinty said that Canada is "considering" helping Iran's neighbours defend themselves if they request assistance from NATO.

After American retaliatory airstrikes on Iran following the collapse of the June 2026 ceasefire on 8 July 2026, Carney described the American strikes as an appropriate response due to Iranian strikes on Qatar and Saudi Arabia. However, Carney also stated that Canada looks to deescalate hostilities between the United States and Iran.

On 6 September 2026, Canadian Minister of Foreign Affairs Anita Anand and Minister of Finance and National Revenue François-Philippe Champagne issued a statement condemning Iran's attacks on ships in the Strait of Hormuz, support of proxy forces, and pursuit of obtaining nuclear weapons. The statement also called on Iran to cease "destabilizing activities" across the Middle East.

On 22 September 2026, in response to the 2026 Yemen offensives and renewed strikes on Saudi Arabia, Canada alongside other members of the G7 called on Iran to end it's military and political support of the Houthis.

At the UN General Assembly in New York on 22 September 2026, Carney described Iran as "one of the greatest threats of the current world" and that Iran poses an "existential threat" to both Israel and it's allies when speaking in response to a question about US President Donald Trump's speech about the possible need to "annihilate" Iran if the war drags on. Carney also stated that Trump's annihilation of Iran comment was simply a "language of war." Carney also added that Canada wants to aid the process of formulating a ceasefire between the two waring parties.

On 12 October 2026, Canada signed a joint statement which condemned Iranian involvement in planning an attack on RAF Fairford in the United Kingdom. The joint statement also condemned attacks linked to Harakat Ashab al-Yamin al-Islamia on Jews in Europe and anti-regime Iranian journalists as well as the silencing of Iranian opposition figures.

On 10 November 2026, Canada imposed sanctions on 11 Iranian entities connected to Iran's ballistic missile and nuclear program. Canadian Foreign Minister Anita Anand also stated that Canada's official position in regards to Iran's nuclear program is that Iran should never be allowed to obtain a nuclear weapon.

=== Domestic criticisms ===
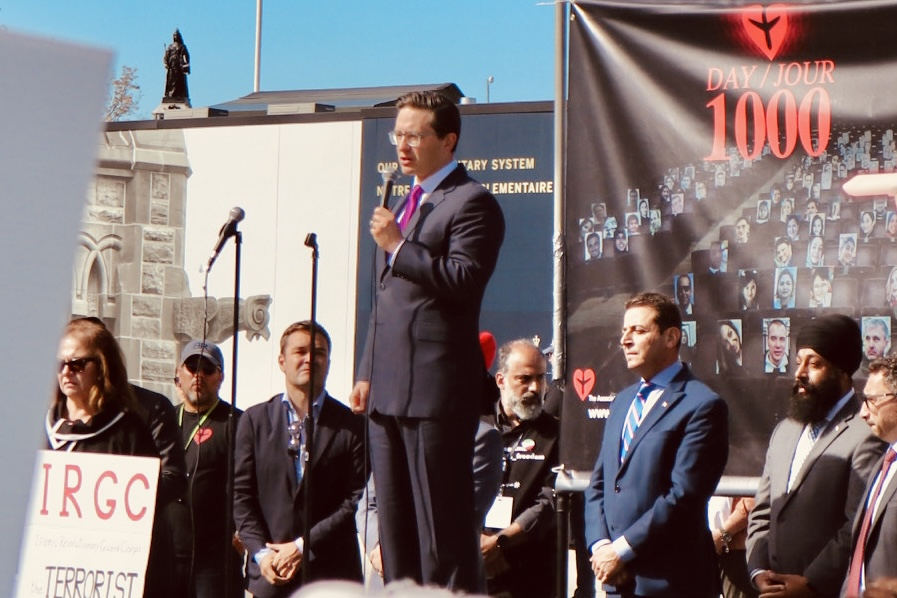
Conservative party leader Pierre Poilievre speaking at a protest marking 1,000 days since the Iranian Revolutionary Guards shot down UIA Flight 752, October 2022

The official Canadian position on the Iran war has been met with several criticisms from both current and former Canadian politicians on both sides of the political spectrum due to conflicting statements during the initial phases of the military action.

On 28 February 2026, Green Party of Canada issued a statement which condemned US military actions while at the same time also condemning the "Iranian regime’s brutal slaughter of its own people." The statement also criticized the Liberal Party of Canada's statement for having "no mention of the deal Trump tore up, no call for a ceasefire or de-escalation, and no assertion of any independent Canadian diplomatic role."

On 28 February 2026, the New Democratic Party issued a statement which condemned American and Israeli bombings while at the same time also condemning Ali Khamenei and his regime and also urged that Iran's nuclear program should be overseen by the United Nations and the International Atomic Energy Agency in a diplomatic solution rather than in a military solution. The statement also criticized Prime Minister Carney for supporting the strikes by the United States and Israel.

Conservative foreign affairs critic Michael Chong accused Carney of contradicting himself and holding an "utterly incoherent position on Iran over the past few days." Conservative party leader Pierre Poilievre accused Carney of "confusing our allies and dividing Canadians" by repeatedly shifting positions on the strikes.

Following a campaign event in Ottawa in early March, NDP leader candidate Avi Lewis described Canadian Prime Minister Mark Carney's reaction to the Iran war as "incoherent" and "all over the place." Lewis also criticized Carney for not ruling out the possibility of sending Canadian troops to assist American and Israeli forces.

On 10 March 2026, NDP foreign affairs critic Alexandre Boulerice stated that the NDP was disappointed with the Prime Minister's response to the war.

Former Canadian foreign affairs minister Lloyd Axworthy described the Canadian government's official response to the Iran war as "very confusing."

=== International criticisms ===
On 17 August 2026, Iranian foreign ministry spokesman Esmaeil Baqaei claimed that Canada was participating in the Iran war despite Canadian officials stating that Canada is not involved in the war and has no intention to get involved.

On 24 September 2026, Iranian foreign ministry spokesman Esmaeil Baqaei criticized Canadian Prime Minister Mark Carney for what he described as appeasement towards the United States rather than condemning Trump's comments about the possible annihilation of Iran.

== Public opinion ==
Protesters at David Lam Park in Vancouver after the initial strikes on Iran, February 2026

An Ipsos poll for Global News released in March 2026 revealed that 61% of Canadians disapprove of the military strike against Iran, with 42% strongly against it. Only 23% approve, and 16% are unsure. Concerns about Canada's possible involvement in the war are significant, with 66% worried about the safety of Canadian soldiers. 41%, of Canadians believe the conflict will not end soon with only 32% thinking it will be resolved in a couple of months. The survey also revealed that Canadians generally prefer solving the Iran conflict through diplomatic discussions with aid rather than using military force. There is only negligible support for sending Canadian troops to maintain peace or for military help to the U.S.

A Leger poll also released in March 2026, indicates approximately 6 out of 10 Canadians (58%) do not agree with the bombing of Iran by the U.S. and Israel. 70% of Canadians believe Canada should stay neutral and not take sides in the conflict. Only 25% think Canada should help the U.S. and Israel with their attacks on Iran. 59% of Canadians would agree to send ground troops to help protect a NATO country if Iran attacked them. Support goes down to 54% for defending oil refineries and shipping, and drops to 39% for being part of a group trying to change the government in Iran.

According to a poll by the Angus Reid Institute that was conducted in mid-March 2026, 74% of Canadians said that the Canadian military should not be involved in the Iran war, 10% said that the Canadian military should be involved in the Iran war, and 15% were unsure. Across party lines, the lowest support for the war was among Liberals, with only 3% saying that that the Canadian military should be involved in the Iran war while the highest support for the war and the highest "unsure" response was among Conservatives with 21% saying that the Canadian military should be involved in the Iran war and 19% being unsure.

== Involvement ==
=== Planning and intelligence ===
The Department of National Defence has denied Canadian involvement in assisting with air strikes that several former military officials and journalists have alleged. According to retired Major-General Denis Thompson, it was likely that Canadian soldiers of the Combined Aerospace Operations Centre of the 1 Canadian Air Division gave intelligence support for the strikes on Iran and would have been "directly involved in targeting". On the topic of potential Canadian involvement, former Canadian foreign affairs minister Lloyd Axworthy wrote, "You cannot embed Canadian officers in U.S. war-fighting headquarters, plug Canadian intelligence into targeting processes, then wash your hands when missiles fly. If Canadian personnel helped plan, analyze or enable an operation, Canada is implicated — whether or not a Canadian finger was on the trigger."

=== Presence of Canadian soldiers at sites attacked by Iran ===
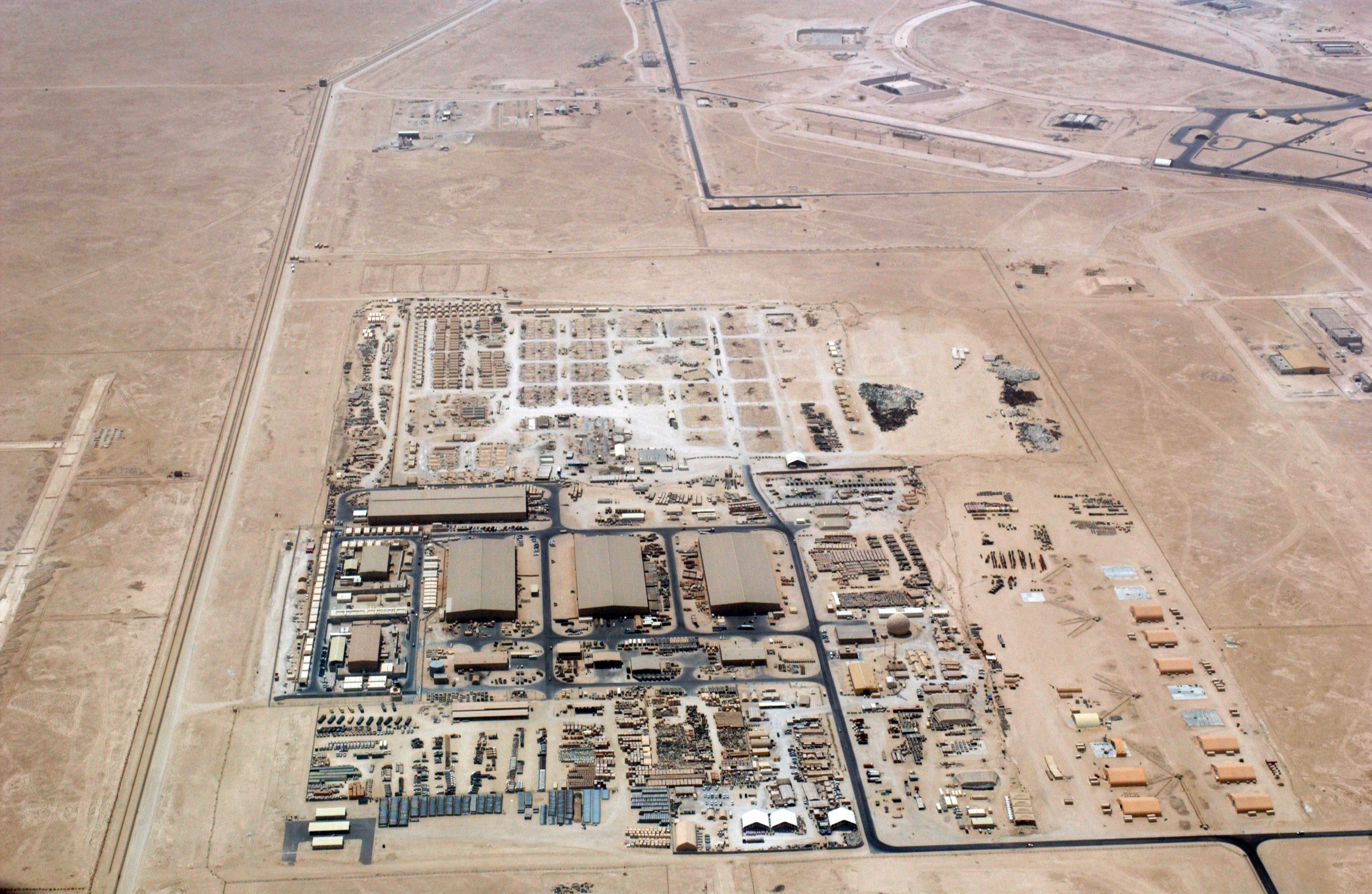
An aerial view of "Log Town" at Al Udeid Air Base in 2004

According to a CBC News report citing the Canadian Department of National Defence's website, members of the Combined Aerospace Operations Centre of the 1 Canadian Air Division were present at Al Udeid Air Base in Qatar the time of the Iranian attack, as were Canadian soldiers working at the U.S. Fifth Fleet headquarters in Bahrain when Iran stuck the headquarters. On 3 March 2026, Canadian Defence Minister David McGuinty confirmed Canadian military presence in the Middle East and confirmed that they had not suffered any casualties. McGuinty also stated that the Canadian Armed Forces will "assess any potential impacts on CAF personnel in the region." Later that day, an Iranian missile struck Al Udeid Air Base but did not cause any casualties. On 12 March 2026, it was revealed that the Camp Canada military base located within the Ali Al Salem Air Base in Kuwait was struck by Iranian missiles on 2 March 2026. During the attack, Canadian soldiers took shelter inside bunkers and suffered no casualties. Satellite images showed that Canadian bunkers had been damaged during the attack. After the news of strikes was made public, the Canadian government faced criticism for not being transparent about the attack.

=== Reported rescue of Americans in the UAE ===
On 26 May 2026, the Semafor reported that Canadian officials in the Middle East, including the United Arab Emirates, helped American citizens escape the region during the early stages of the war. The report was confirmed the next day by the Global Affairs Canada.

== Economic impact ==
Fuel price October vs April

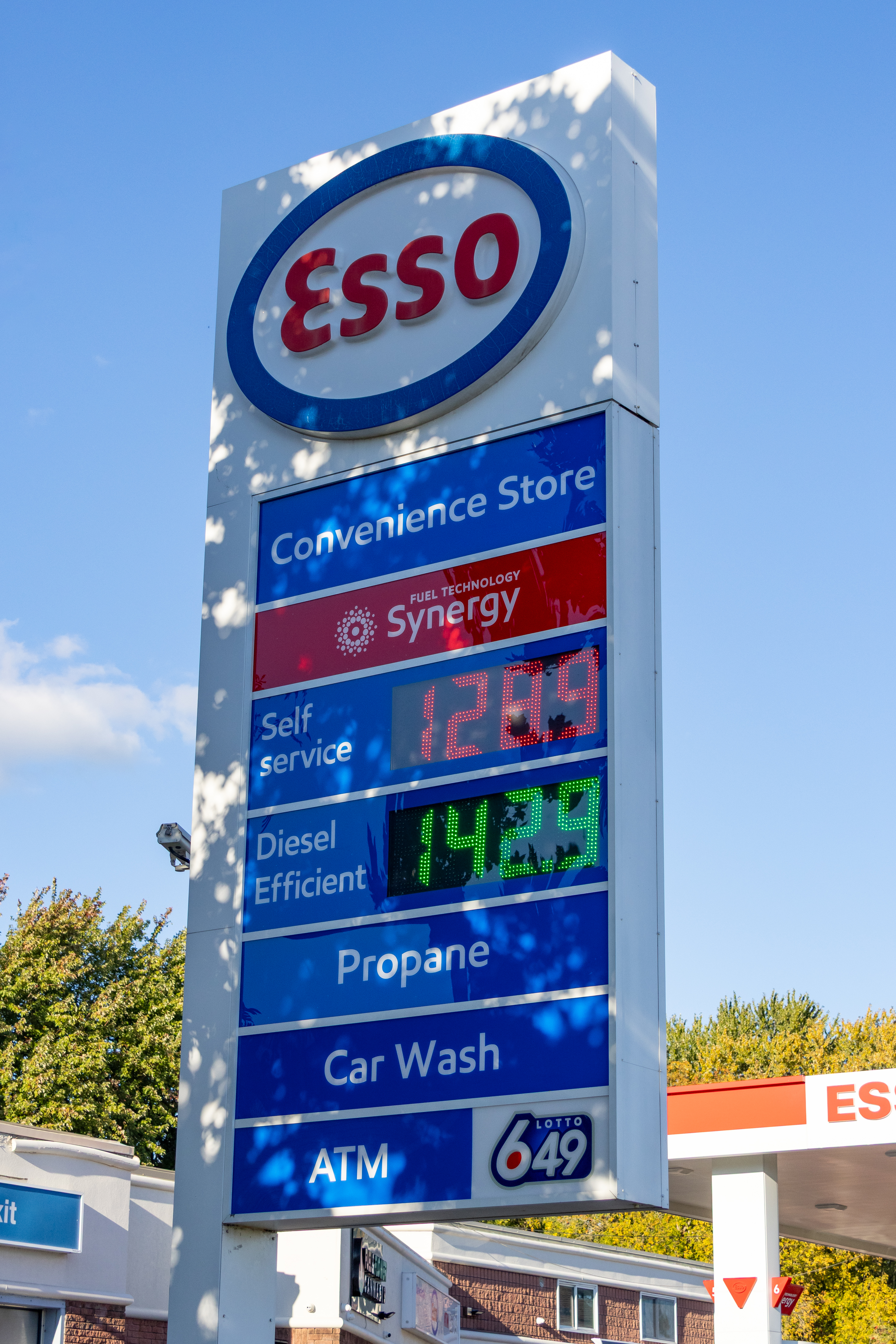
October 8 2025 - CAD$1.289 per litre (128.9 cents per litre)

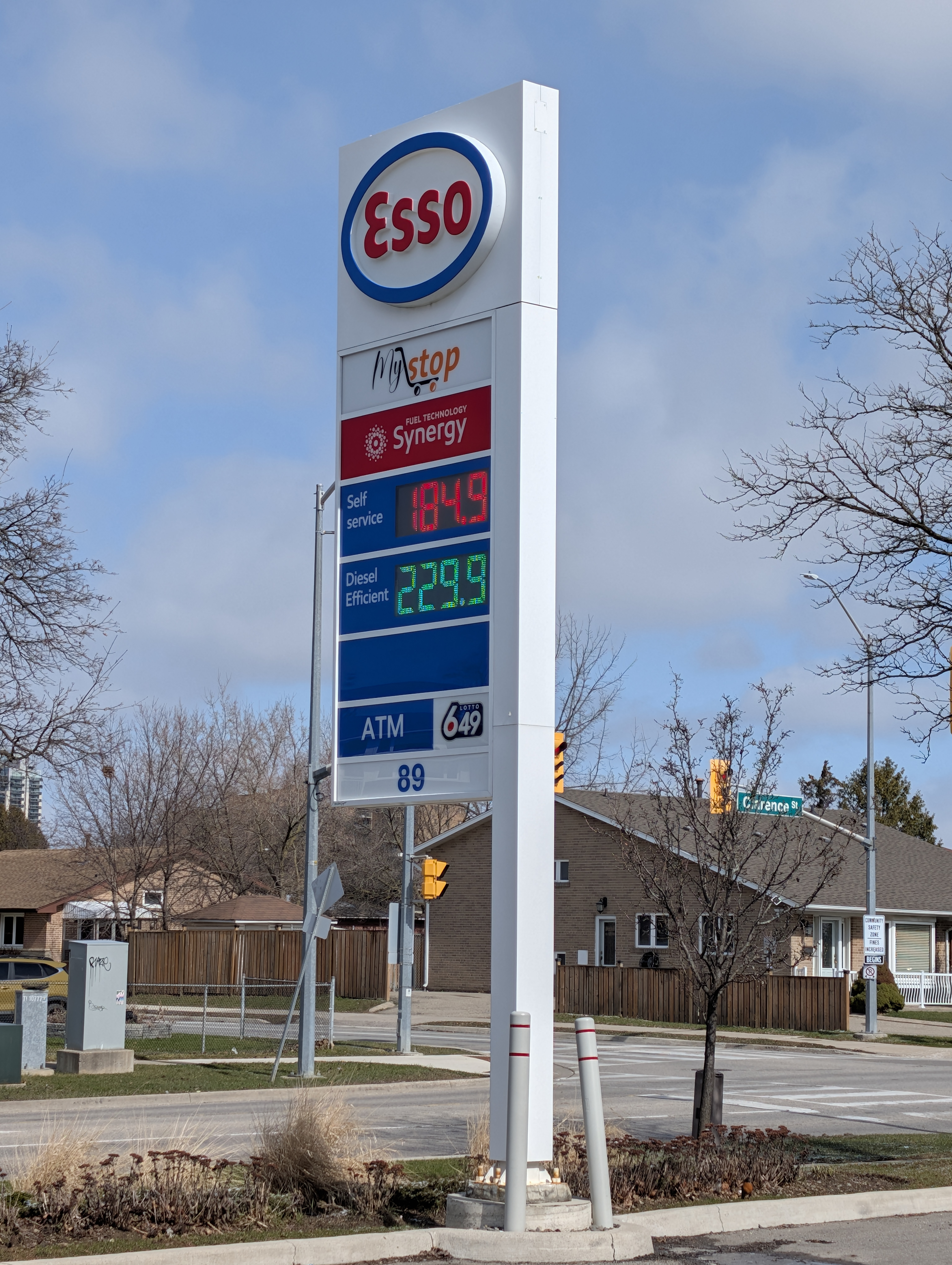
April 7 2026 - CAD$1.849 per litre (184.9 cents per litre)

The Iran conflict alongside the United States trade war, has significantly impacted Canada’s economy by driving up energy prices and elevating inflation. Rising oil prices have increasing transportation and input costs, placing upward pressure on food prices. Canada's 2026 growth forecast was revised down, with fears of a prolonged "energy crisis". In response to the crises, the Canadian government has introduced measures such as suspending federal taxes on fuels, and prior to the Iran conflict, implemented food subsidies. Canadian oil producers have seen high profits as global buyers look for alternatives because of the closure of the Strait of Hormuz. According to economist Tu Nguyen, the Iran war has the potential to cause increased inflation in Canada. Nguyen also reported that inflation caused by the Iran war and job cuts caused by American tariffs on Canada were the two biggest issues currently facing the Canadian economy.

== See also ==
- 2025–2026 Iranian protests
- Iranian Canadians
- List of country-specific articles on the 2026 Iran war
- Media coverage of the 2026 Iran war
- Reactions to the 2026 Iran war
