= Charles Bouchard =

Retired Royal Canadian Air Force general

J.J.C. Bouchard
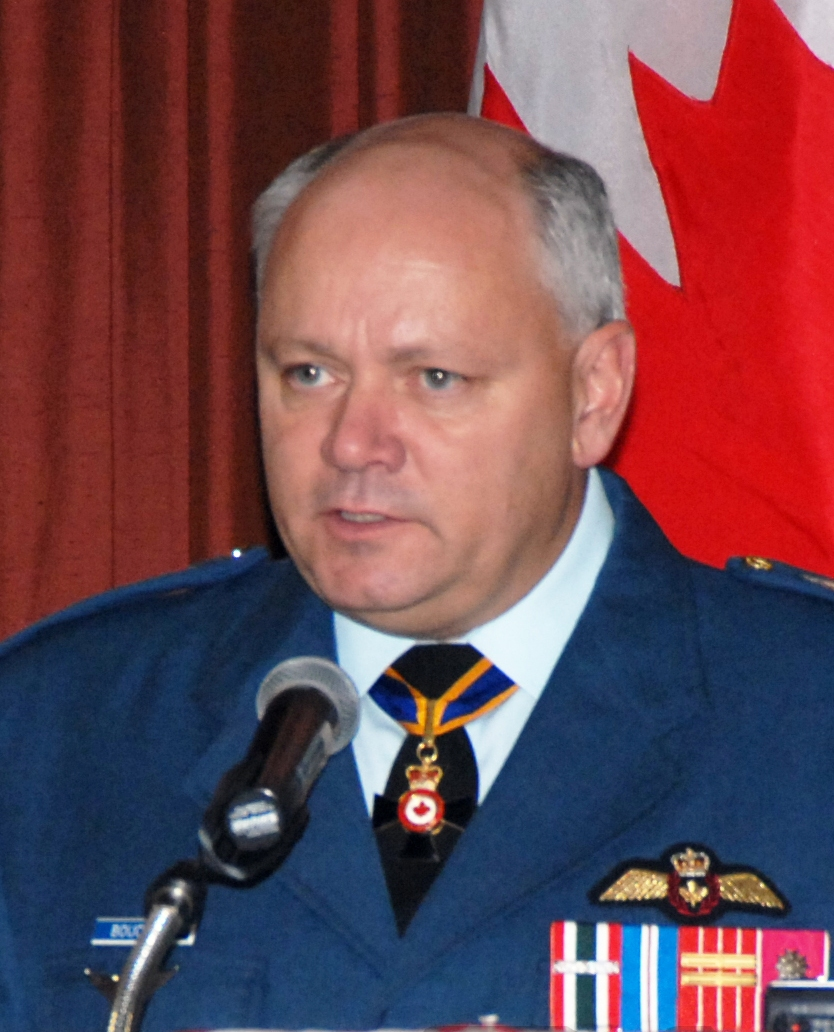
- Lt. Gen Charles Bouchard addresses Canadian military and WWII veterans during a Battle of Britain commemoration.
- Born: 1956 (age 69–70); Chicoutimi, Quebec, Canada
- Military career
- Allegiance: Canada
- Branch: Royal Canadian Air Force (Note: Known as Air Command until 2011)
- Service years: 1974–2012
- Rank: Lieutenant General
- Units: 427 Squadron; 403 Squadron; 444 Squadron
- Commands: 444 Squadron; 1 Wing Kingston; 1 Canadian Air Division
- Conflicts: Operation Unified Protector
- Awards: Officer of the Order of Canada; Commander of the Order of Military Merit; Meritorious Service Cross; Special Service Medal; QEII Golden Jubilee Medal; Canadian Forces' Decoration; Officer of the Legion of Merit (US)

Lieutenant General Joseph Jacques Charles "Charlie" Bouchard (born 1956) OC CMM MSC CD is a retired Royal Canadian Air Force general. He has served as Commander of 1 Canadian Air Division / Canadian NORAD Region, the Deputy Commander of North American Aerospace Defence Command (NORAD) and Deputy Commander of Allied Joint Force Command Naples. On 25 March 2011, Bouchard was named Commander of the NATO military mission in Libya.

== Biography ==
Joseph Jacques Charles Bouchard was born in the Chicoutimi borough of Saguenay, Quebec, Canada. He enrolled with the Canadian Forces in 1974 under the Officer Candidate Training Plan. After helicopter training, Bouchard qualified in 1976 as a helicopter pilot.

Bouchard has had a long career in Tactical Aviation within Canadian Forces Air Command, which included flying positions in several squadrons, command of 444 Tactical Helicopter Squadron at Lahr in Germany, and command of 1 Wing Kingston. Bouchard has served in the United States as Deputy Commander for Continental NORAD Region and was standing duty at Tyndall Air Force Base conducting Air Operation on 11 September 2001. Bouchard would later become Deputy Commander of 1 Canadian Air Division, and from August 2007 to June 2009, Deputy Commander of North American Aerospace Defense Command, receiving promotion to Lieutenant-General on taking up the appointment. In 2009, he assumed the position of Deputy Commander, Allied Joint Force Command Naples.

On 25 March 2011, while continuing to serve at Naples, Bouchard was named Commander of "Operation Unified Protector", NATO's military intervention in Libya. The Libya mission provided air cover to overthrow the country's long-time national leader Muammar Gaddafi – a mission in which fighter jets played a massive role. Bouchard was replaced in October 2011 as Deputy Commander Allied JFC Naples by a fellow Canadian Marquis Hainse, the position having fallen vacant while Bouchard served as the Commander of the NATO mission in Libya.

Bouchard is a graduate of Canadian Forces Staff School; Canadian Land Forces Command and Staff College; Canadian Forces Command and Staff College; the National Strategic Studies Course; the Combined Forces Air Component Commander Course, Maxwell Air Force Base; the Generals, Flag Officers and Ambassadors Course at the NATO Defense College; and the Senior Executives National and International Security Program at Harvard University. Bouchard also has a Bachelor of Arts Degree in political science from the University of Manitoba.

Bouchard retired from the Canadian Forces in April 2012. On 24 September 2013, Lockheed Martin announced Bouchard had been appointed "the country lead for Lockheed Martin Canada".

== Medals and decorations ==
Bouchard's medal ribbons are as follows:

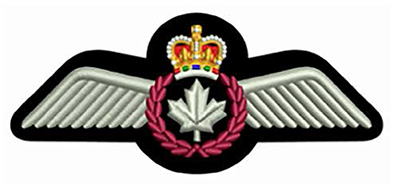

Ribbon	Description	Notes
	Order of Canada (OC)	Appointed Officer (OC) on 3 November 2011
	Order of Military Merit (CMM)	Appointed Commander (CMM) on 29 September 2005; Appointed Officer (OMM) on 29 September 2000
	Meritorious Service Cross (MSC)	Decoration awarded on 13 August 2011; Military division
	Special Service Medal	with NATO-OTAN Clasp
	Queen Elizabeth II Golden Jubilee Medal	Decoration awarded in 2002; Canadian version
	Canadian Forces' Decoration (CD)	with two Clasp for 32 years of services
	Legion of Merit (United States)	Decoration awarded 26 April 2013; Officer level (This is his third award of this decoration); United States award
	Legion of Honour	Decoration awarded 25 February 2012; Officer level; France award

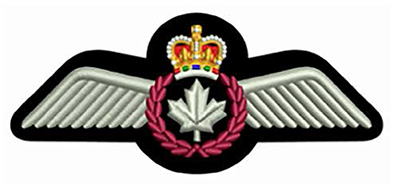
- He was a qualified RCAF Pilot and as such wore the Royal Canadian Air Forces Pilot Wings

== Notes ==
Military offices
Preceded by Marc Dumais	Commander of the 1 Canadian Air Division / Canadian NORAD Region; 3 August 2004 – 17 July 2007	Succeeded by Marcel Duval
Preceded by Rick Findley	Deputy Commander of the North American Aerospace Defense Command; 2 August 2007 – 10 July 2009	Succeeded by Marcel Duval
Preceded by Peter Pearson	Deputy Commander of the Allied Joint Force Command Naples; 3 October 2009 – 2011	Succeeded by Marquis Hainse
