= Marcel Duval =

Canadian military personnel

J. Marcel Duval
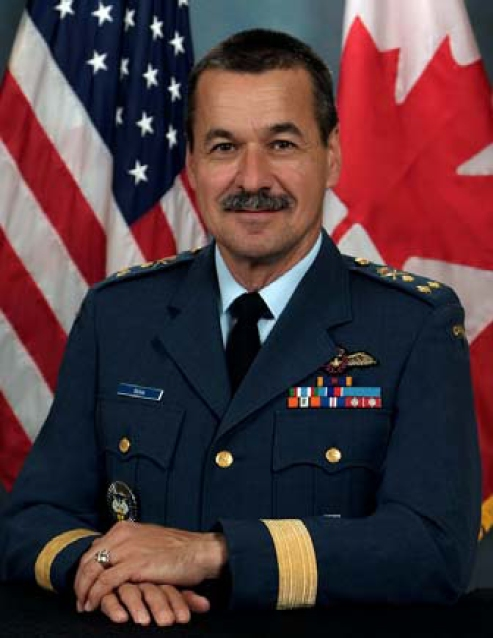
- Duval
- Born: Baie-Saint-Paul, Quebec, Canada
- Military career
- Allegiance: Canada
- Branch: Canadian Forces Air Command
- Service years: 1975–2011
- Rank: Lieutenant-General
- Commands: 1 Canadian Air Division
- Awards: Commander of the Order of Military Merit

J. Marcel Duval, CMM, CD is a retired Canadian Forces Air Command general. His senior appointments were as the Commander of the 1 Canadian Air Division / Canadian NORAD Region and the Deputy Commander of NORAD.

== Career ==
Duval was born in Baie-Saint-Paul, Quebec, Canada. He joined the Canadian Armed Forces (CAF) in 1975. After graduating from flight training in 1977, he specialized as a pilot of the CH-135 Twin Huey utility helicopter. On 30 January 2009, Duval was made a Commander of the Order of Military Merit.

Duval was appointed as Deputy Commander of the North American Aerospace Defense Command (NORAD) on 10 July 2009. He was previously Commander of the 1 Canadian Air Division / Canadian NORAD Region.

On 15 August 2011, Duval was succeeded as Deputy Commander by Thomas J. Lawson and retired from the Air Force.

Military offices
Preceded by Charles Bouchard	Commander of the 1 Canadian Air Division / Canadian NORAD Region; 17 July 2007 - 9 July 2009	Succeeded by Yvan Blondin
Preceded by Charles Bouchard	Deputy Commander of the North American Aerospace Defense Command; 9 July 2009 - 15 August 2011	Succeeded by Thomas Lawson
