= James George (diplomat) =

Canadian diplomat (1918–2020)

James George (September 14, 1918 – February 7, 2020) was a Canadian diplomat and environmentalist. George served as the Canadian ambassador to a number of south and central Asian countries, and turned to environmentalism and spirituality after his retirement from government service in 1977. He continued his environmental activism until his death in 2020.

== Early life ==
George was born in September 1918 in Toronto, Ontario. He received a Littauer Fellowship to Harvard University, and was a 1940 Rhodes Scholar for Ontario, studying at Upper Canada College, Trinity College, and University of Toronto, and was awarded an Honorary Doctorate of Sacred Letters by Trinity College, University of Toronto, at its May 2008 Convocation. While a student at the University of Toronto, he was a member of the Alpha Delta Phi fraternity.

== Career ==
George served in the Royal Canadian Naval Volunteer Reserve during World War II, attaining to the rank of Lt. Commander, following which he represented Canada at the United Nations. Between 1955 and 1957 he was deputy director at the Intelligence division at the External affairs in Ottawa. He was later the Canadian deputy permanent representative at NATO in Paris from 1957 to 1960, overlapping with his countryman Hugh Hambleton, who was later revealed to be a Soviet spy.

James George then served as High Commissioner of Canada to Sri Lanka (Ceylon) 1960–64, then in Paris at the Canadian embassy, High Commissioner to India and Ambassador to Nepal 1967–72, and Ambassador to Iran and the Gulf States 1972–77. Commonwealth Secretary-General Arnold Smith credited George with helping to contain the conflict between India and Pakistan in 1971, when East Pakistan became Bangladesh.

Retiring from diplomatic service in 1977, George turned his attention to ecological and spiritual issues full time. While directing Threshold Foundation he helped to found in London (1978–82), he played a leading role in the adoption by the International Whaling Commission of a moratorium on high seas whaling and to ban all whaling in the Indian Ocean and the Antarctic. In 1984, he co-founded the Anwar Sadat Peace Foundation to promote peace in the Middle East, and the following year was a founder of the Rainforest Action Network. More recently, he has worked to develop wind power resources in British Columbia, and has been helping to develop new technology to make the desalination of seawater more affordable.

His publisher's bio describes George as "first and foremost a spiritual seeker." During his years of diplomatic service, he met numerous spiritual thinking and teachers, including Krishnamurti, Thomas Merton, Yogaswami of Sri Lanka, Dr. Javad Nurbakhsh, Dudjom Rinpoche, and Chogyam Trungpa Rinpoche. Across six decades he has been a devoted practitioner of the Gurdjieff Work, and was a close disciple of the late Madame de Salzmann, G.I. Gurdjieff's primary student. In 1968, he wrote a letter of recommendation for Yogi Bhajan on the occasion of his commencing his teaching mission in the West.

== Personal life ==
George was twice married, first to Caroline Parfitt, 1942–96, with whom he had three children: Daniel, Graham (died 2003) and Caroline Randolph (Dolphi). He married Barbara Brady Wright in San Francisco on 1 January 2005, at the age of 86.

In September 2007, CBC aired a short documentary about him titled "In the Spirit of Diplomacy," by independent film-maker Marco Mascarin. This piece used elements of a 1975 documentary by Paul Saltzman entitled "Saint Demetrius Rides a Red Horse: James George Leaves India."

George turned 100 in September 2018 and died in February 2020 at the age of 101.

== Publications ==
- George, James (1975). Achaemenid Orientations.
- George, James; Blackwelder, Brent (10 July 1991). "Oil Fires: A Middleast Chernobyl?". Toronto Star. p. A21.
- George, James (1 September 2002). Asking for the Earth: Waking Up to the Spiritual/Ecological Crisis. Barrytown, NY: Station Hill Press. ISBN 978-1581770902.
- George, James (22 August 2009). The Little Green Book on Awakening. Barrytown, NY: Station Hill Press. ISBN 978-1-58177-112-1.
- George, James (2016). Last Call : Awaken to Consciousness (Paperback).

Diplomatic posts
Preceded by Reginald George Cavell	Canadian High Commissioner to Ceylon; 2 August 1960 – 6 March 1964	Succeeded by George Kinnear Grande
Preceded by Douglas Barcham Hicks	Canadian High Commissioner to India; 17 July 1967 – 20 August 1972	Succeeded by Bruce MacGillivray Williams
Preceded by Roland Michener	Canadian Ambassador to Nepal; 23 July 1967 – 20 August 1972	Succeeded by Bruce MacGillivray Williams
Preceded by Frederick Martyn Meech	Canadian Ambassador to Iran; 23 May 1972 – 21 September 1977	Succeeded by Kenneth Douglas Taylor
