= Canada–Iran relations =

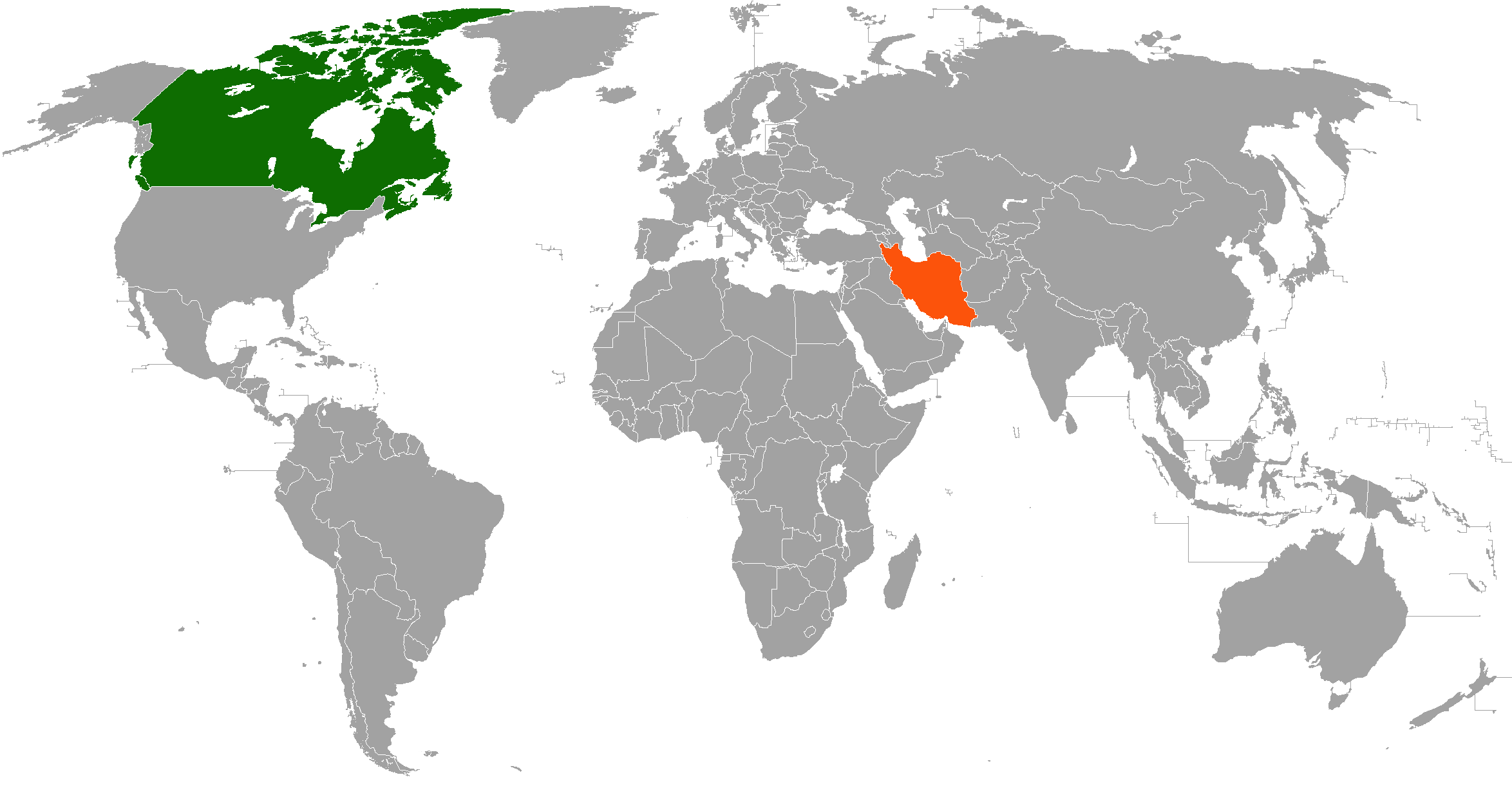

- Canada: Iran

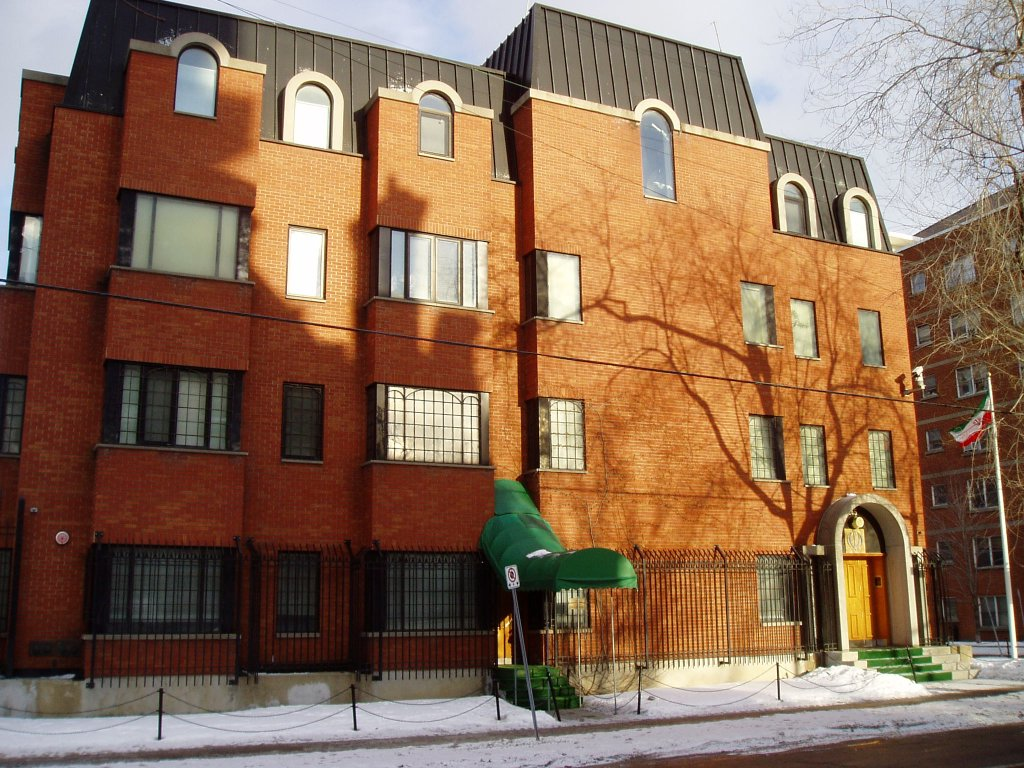
Former Iranian embassy in Ottawa

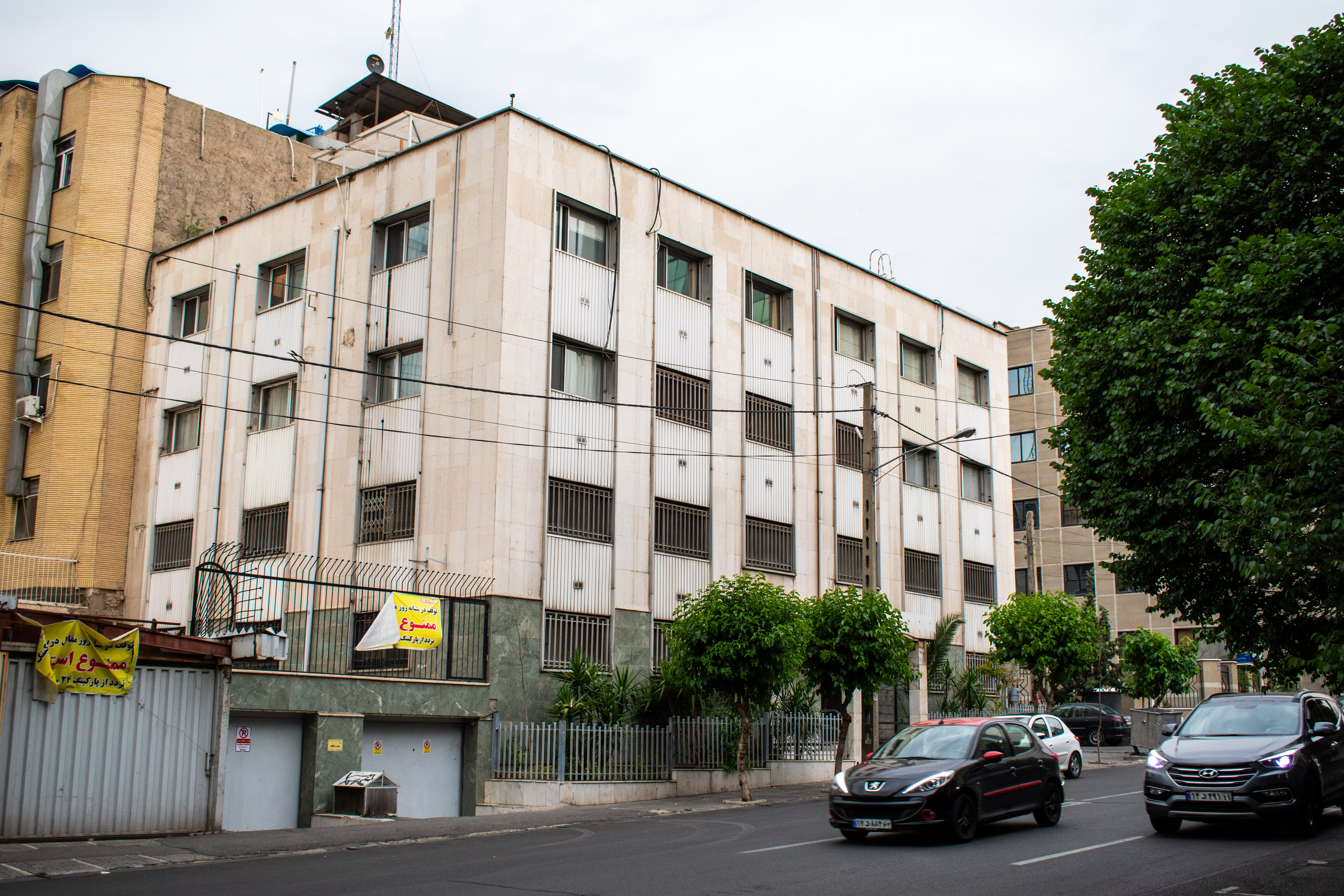
Former Canadian embassy in Tehran

Canada has not had a formal diplomatic presence in Iran since 2012, and as of February 2026, the Canadian government has stated that restoration of ties would require a change in the Iranian regime.

Canada has imposed significant, autonomous sanctions on Iran for over 15 years, with the first "Made-in-Canada" sanctions established in July 2010, with the newest sanctions implemented in early 2026.

On 8 January 2020, a Boeing 737-800 was shot down by the Islamic Revolutionary Guard Corps (IRGC) shortly after takeoff killing all 176 occupants on board, including 57 Canadians. Canada has sought legal action against Iran through the International Court of Justice "in pursuit of accountability and full reparation".

In June 2024, Canada officially designated the IRGC as a terrorist organization under the Canadian Criminal Code.

The Canadian government has officially abstained from joining in U.S.-led Israel war in Iran.

== History ==
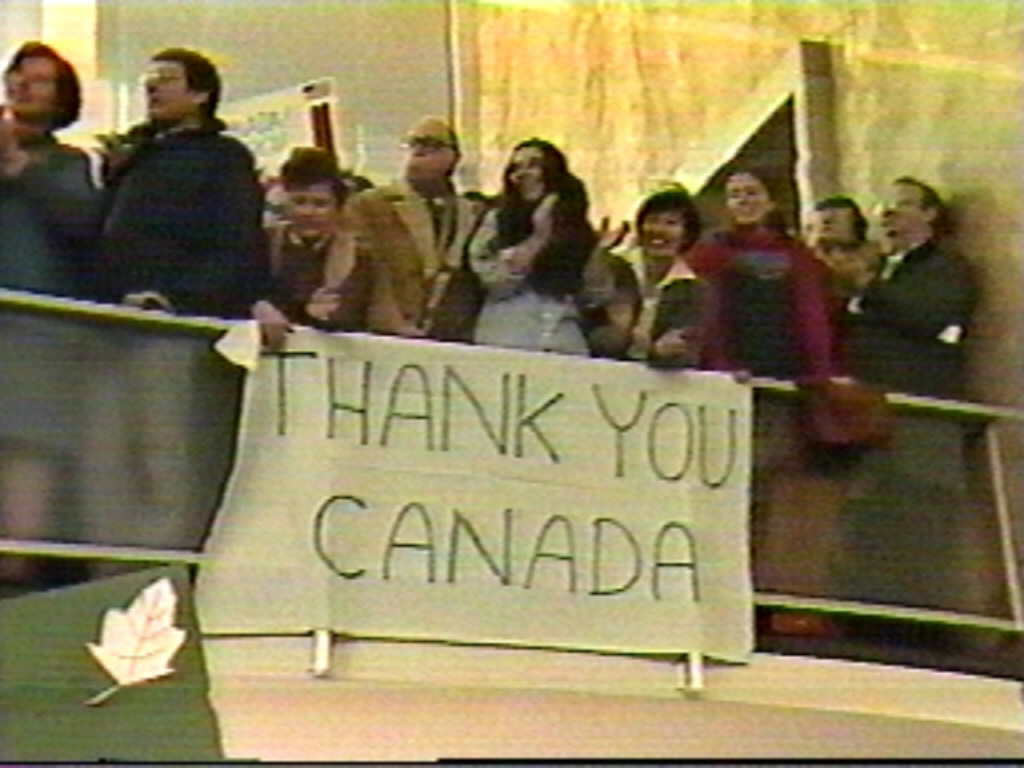
Americans display their gratitude for Canadian efforts during the Canadian Caper, a rescue mission of American diplomats during the November 1979–January 1981 Iran hostage crisis.

Prior to 1955, Canadian consular and commercial affairs in Iran were conducted through the British Embassy to Iran. Foreign relations and diplomatic ties between Canada and Iran began with the founding of an Iranian mission in Ottawa in 1956, and a Canadian mission in Tehran in 1959. The Canadian mission was granted embassy status in 1961.

=== Rupture of relations under Khomeini ===
Formal relations between the two nations continued uninterrupted from 1955 until 1980. When Ayatollah Ruhollah Khomeini's Iranian Revolution drove the Shah from the country in 1979, the Canadian Embassy scrambled to evacuate the 850 Canadian workers in Iran while the embassy staff remained. Six American diplomats took refuge in the Canadian embassy after Iranian student protesters stormed the U.S. embassy, and the Canadian government, in coordination with the Central Intelligence Agency, safely evacuated them from the country using Canadian passports with forged Iranian visas. This covert rescue became known as the "Canadian Caper", and while it improved Canada's relations with the United States, Canada–Iran relations became more volatile. The embassy staff were quickly evacuated for fear of retribution against Canadians, and the embassy was closed in 1980.

=== Resumption of diplomatic relations under Khamenei ===
From 1980 to 1988, under Brian Mulroney, Canada and Iran did not have diplomatic ties, though relations were not formally severed. The Canadian government was reluctant to reopen an embassy, both because of the history, and given the Iranian government's history of kidnapping and torturing diplomats. In 1988, the two governments agreed to resume diplomatic relations at a low level, and the Canadian embassy in Tehran was re-opened.

Due to rocky relations after the Iranian Revolution, Iran did not establish an embassy in Canada until 1991. Its staff, which had been living in a building on Roosevelt Avenue in Ottawa's west end, moved into 245 Metcalfe Street in the Centretown neighbourhood of Ottawa, and the mission was upgraded to embassy status. In Tehran, the Canadian Embassy had been located at 57 Shahid Sarafaz Street and Ostad Motahari Avenue. The mission was staffed by a chargé rather than a full ambassador.

During the tenure of prime minister Jean Chrétien, the nations formally exchanged ambassadors in 1996. Canadian concerns over human rights abuses in Iran, its record on nuclear non-proliferation, Holocaust denial and threats to destroy Israel, and its active opposition to the Middle East peace process led to a policy of "controlled engagement" by Canadian diplomats. Bilateral ties were restricted, such as preventing direct air links between the two countries or the opening of Iranian consulates and cultural centres in Canada (other than the embassy in Ottawa).

Canada has also continued to express its concern about human rights in Iran, and in particular, issues such as the independence of the judiciary, arbitrary detention, freedom of expression, treatment of women and treatment of persons belonging to religious and ethnic minorities, including Iran's small remaining Jewish community, and members of the Baháʼí Faith.

=== 2003: Zahra Kazemi ===
Relations between Canada and Iran drastically deteriorated in June 2003 when Zahra Kazemi, an Iranian-Canadian freelance photographer from Montreal, was arrested while taking pictures outside a prison in Tehran during a student protest. Three weeks later, she was killed while in custody.

Iranian authorities insisted that her death was accidental, claiming that she died of a stroke while being interrogated. However, Shahram Azam, a former military staff physician, stated that he examined Kazemi's body and observed obvious signs of torture, including a skull fracture, broken nose, signs of rape and severe abdominal bruising. This information was revealed within Azam's case for seeking asylum in Canada in 2004.

Kazemi's death in Iranian custody attracted widespread international attention. Because of her joint citizenship and the circumstances of her death, the tragedy generated considerable protest. In November 2003, Canadian Journalists for Free Expression honoured Kazemi with the Tara Singh Hayer Memorial Award in recognition of her courage in defending the right to free expression.

Canada drafted a United Nations resolution to condemn human rights abuses in Iran, expressing concern for Iran's use of torture and other forms of cruel, inhuman and degrading punishment, particularly the practice of amputation and flogging. In response and to shift the focus, Gholamhossein Elham, the Iranian judiciary spokesman, responded by claiming, "The Canadian government has the worst, most backward and racist judiciary system." Iran further accused a Canadian police officer of gunning down 18-year-old Iranian Kayvan Tabesh on July 14 in Vancouver. The police officer claimed self-defence after the teenager allegedly charged at him with a machete. Iran also presented a 70-page report before the adoption of the resolution, detailing alleged human rights abuses in Canada in an attempt to discredit the main backer of the resolution.

In another incident, a prominent Canadian-Iranian blogger, Hossein Derakhshan, was detained by police in Tehran in 2008 over remarks he made about the Shiite faith, according to the Iranian Judiciary.

=== 2005: "Controlled engagement" and United Nations Resolution 1737 ===
On May 17, 2005, Canada tightened its controlled engagement policy by limiting talks with Iran to four subjects:

1. Human rights situation in Iran;
2. Iran's nuclear programme and its compliance with non-proliferation obligations;
3. The case of Zahra Kazemi;
4. Iran's role in the region.

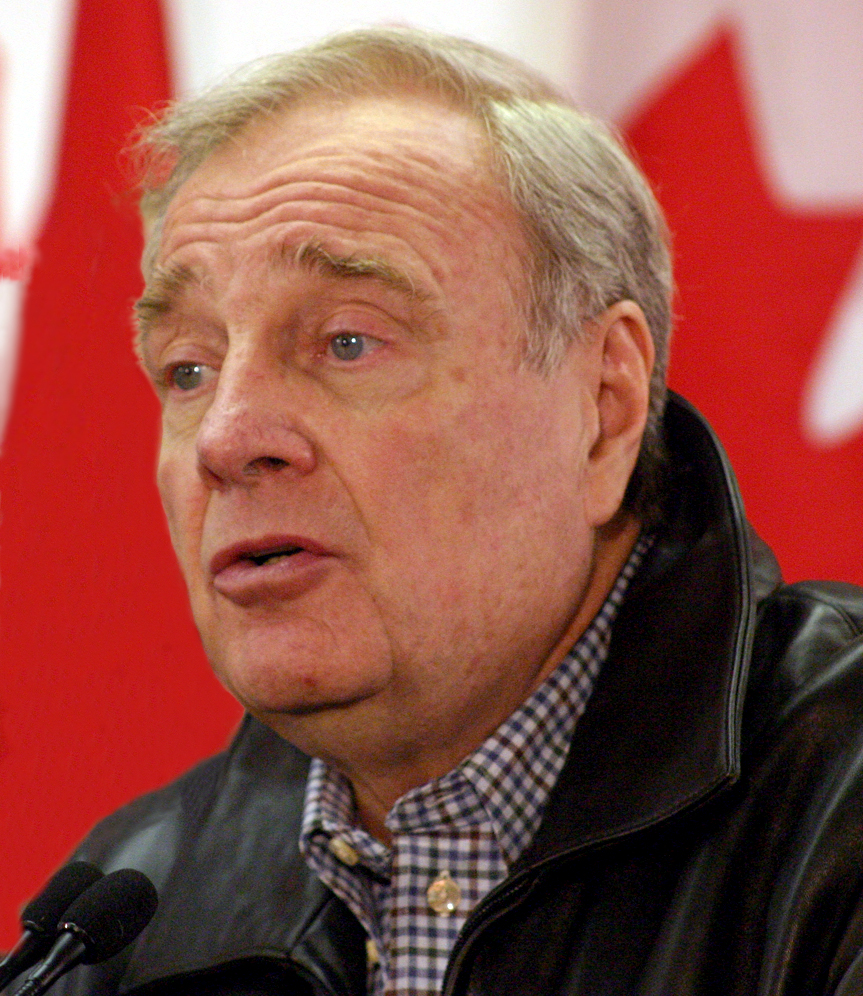
Paul Martin, Canadian Prime Minister 2003–2006

In October 2005, Iranian president Mahmoud Ahmadinejad gave a speech at a conference entitled "The World Without Zionism". During the speech he made comments that were widely interpreted as anti-semitic by the Jewish community and the Western world in general. Canadian Prime Minister Paul Martin summoned the Iranian ambassador in Canada and gave a formal reprimand.

On December 26, 2006, the United Nations Security Council unanimously adopted Resolution 1737, demanding that Iran suspend its uranium enrichment program or face economic sanctions. On February 22, the Governor-in-Council made new regulations under the United Nations Act: Regulations Implementing the United Nations Resolution on Iran. Together with existing relevant provisions of the Canada Shipping Act, the Export and Import Permits Act, and the Nuclear Safety and Control Act, these provisions allowed Canada to bring economic sanctions against Iran as requested in resolution 1737. The sanctions include a ban on any trade that could contribute to Iran's activities in enrichment, reprocessing heavy water, or the development of nuclear weapons delivery systems. The regulations also deal with freezing assets and notification of travel by Iranian officials in Canada.

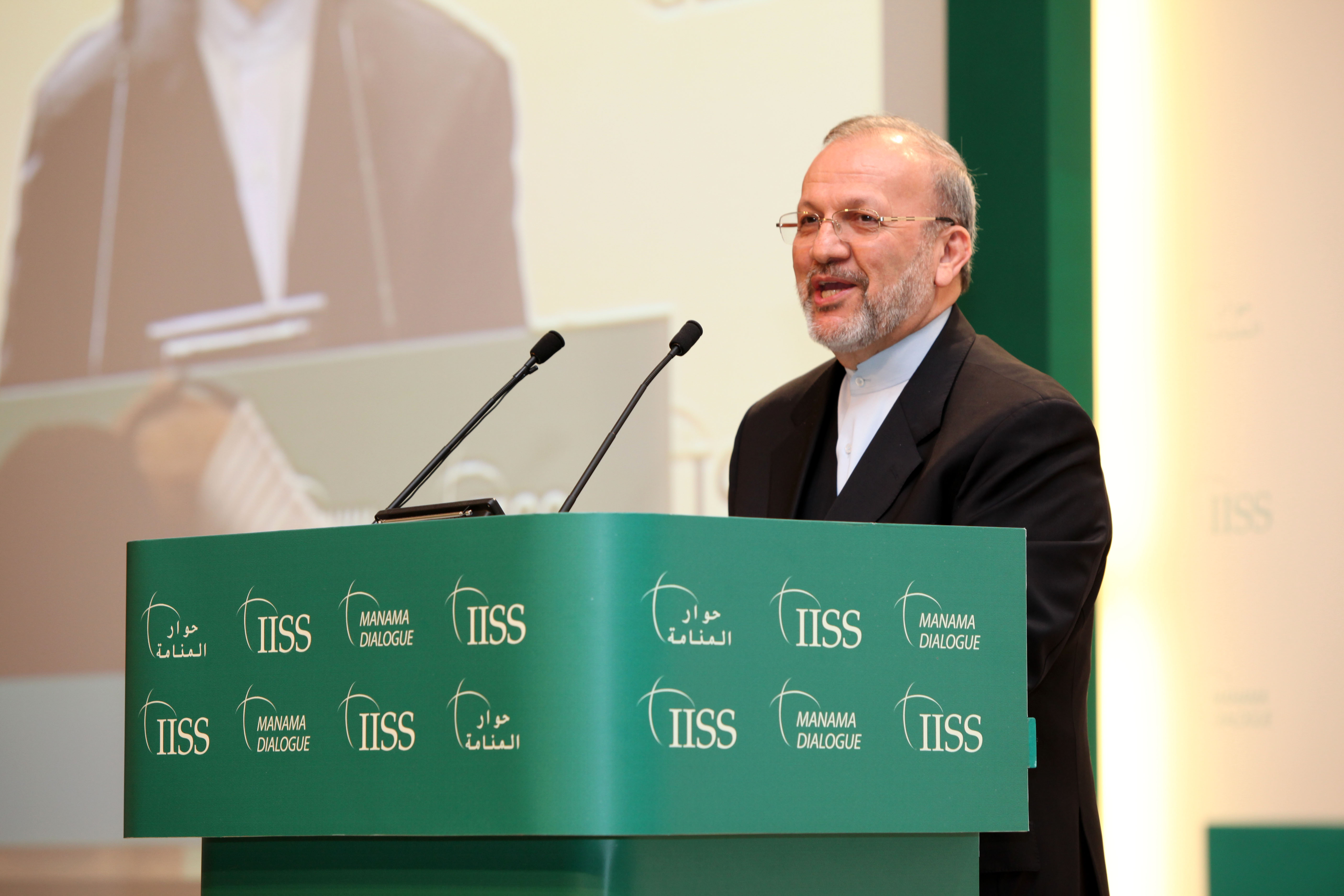
Manouchehr Mottaki in April 2010

In June, Iranian Foreign Minister Manouchehr Mottaki told the Islamic Republic News Agency that Canada was "hiding some spies at their embassy in Tehran and allowing them to escape". Mottaki told the IRNA that he warned his Canadian counterpart at the UN General Assembly in 2005 that "Canada should be aware of its limits and realize what country it was dealing with." On November 30, 2006, the conservative-dominated parliament in Iran accused the Canadian embassy of being a "den of spies" for the United States and launched a query to investigate. Iranian MPs met with the Iranian Intelligence Minister Gholam Hossein Mohseni Ejeie to discuss the charges.

In 2007, moves to warm relations between the two countries occurred with the Supreme Court in Iran calling for another review of the death of Zahra Kazemi, and an attempt to again exchange ambassadors. Canada rejected two Iranian candidates after Canadian intelligence suggested they may have been involved with the radical student uprising that stormed the U.S. embassy in 1979. Iran then refused to review the credentials of the Canadian candidate John Mundy, an act which Canada's foreign affairs minister Maxime Bernier claimed was "retaliation for Ottawa's rejection of Iran's top choices". Mundy was later expelled from Tehran.

=== 2010: Economic sanctions ===
In 2010, amendments to the Special Economic Measures Act of 2004 restricted financial transactions and economic activities between Canada and Iran that are considered beneficial to the Iranian government. In response to the Act, Toronto-Dominion Bank closed a number of accounts of Iranian-Canadian customers to comply with the sanctions.

Having already imposed a series of trade sanctions in 2012, Foreign Affairs Minister John Baird imposed additional bans and froze all remaining trade with Iran. This came at a time when bilateral trade was worth around C$135 million (US$130 million). This was enacted in protest the Tehran's nuclear ambitions and human rights record. Baird was quoted as saying, "The absence of progress ... leads Canada to ban effectively immediately all imports and exports from Iran". Statistics Canada's data for 2012 reveals exports to Iran were worth around C$95 million, mostly consisting of cereals, oil seeds, and fruit, as well as chemical products, and machinery. Iranian exports totaled C$40 million, with fruits, nuts, and textiles being most prevalent. Baird delivered his message to an approving audience in Washington at the annual conference of the American Israel Public Affairs Committee. Baird won an extended standing ovation for reiterating the government's view that Iran's pursuit of a nuclear weapon is the most dangerous threat to global security.

While Baird's premise is to increase pressure on it until its government either surrenders or collapses, the United States, United Kingdom, France, and Germany have taken a different approach. They are committed to negotiation with Iran's current government, and are willing to accommodate legitimate Iranian interests. Their aim is to settle the nuclear issue, reintegrate Iran into the international economy, and support Iranian reform. Their approach is fully consistent with support for Iranian human rights. In 2003, after years of patient negotiation between Iran and the European Union, Iran agreed to all of this and also made a direct overture to the United States. The agreement lasted until 2005, when Ayatollah Khamenei became convinced that Europe was negotiating in bad faith and only acting for the United States, who remained unambiguously hostile.

=== 2012: Baird severs diplomatic ties ===
On September 7, 2012 (during APEC Russia 2012 summit), Canadian Minister of Foreign Affairs John Baird announced that Canada was breaking diplomatic relations with Iran. Canada severed diplomatic ties with Iran and closed its embassy in Tehran, citing Iran's material support to the Assad regime during the Syrian civil war, non-compliance with United Nations resolutions regarding its nuclear program, continuing threats to Israel, and fears for the safety of Canadian diplomats following attacks on the British embassy in Iran in violation of the Vienna Convention. In addition, Canada formally listed the Iranian regime as a state sponsor of terrorism under the Justice for Victims of Terrorism Act. The Canadian Department of Foreign Affairs and International Trade advised all Canadians against travelling to Iran. Consular services would be assured by the Embassy of Canada in Ankara, Turkey and the department's Emergency Watch and Response Centre. Ten Canadian diplomats had already left Iran when Canada announced the closure of its embassy. This move was another step by Canada to isolate Iran in addition to economic sanctions.

Canadian Prime Minister Stephen Harper was quoted as saying that the Iranian government is "unambiguously, a clear and present danger," and that "the appeal of our conscience requires us to speak out against what the Iranian regime stands for." Canada's foreign affairs ministry offered the following explanation:

The Iranian regime is providing increasing military assistance to the Assad regime; it refuses to comply with UN resolutions pertaining to its nuclear program; it routinely threatens the existence of the State of Israel and engages in racist anti-Semitic rhetoric and incitement to genocide; it is among the world's worst violators of human rights; and it shelters and materially supports terrorist groups, requiring the Government of Canada to formally list Iran as a state sponsor of terrorism under the Justice for Victims of Terrorism Act.

After Canada's announcement of closure, a note written in Persian was posted on the door of Iran's embassy in Ottawa that noted: "Because of the hostile decision by the government of Canada, the embassy of the Islamic Republic of Iran in Ottawa is closed and has no choice but to stop providing any consular services for its dear citizens."

==== Reactions ====
In the Calgary Herald, Baird clarified that he 'views the government of Iran as the most significant threat to global peace and security in the world today.' The Canadian embassy in Tehran remains closed, and Iranian diplomats were declared personae non gratae, ordering them to leave Canada within five days. James George, who served as Canada's ambassador to Iran between 1972 and 1977, criticized Baird, saying "It's stupid to close an embassy in these circumstances."

Ramin Mehmanparast, spokesman of the Iranian Ministry of Foreign Affairs described this development as "the hostile" action of the "racist government in Canada", which is following "the pursuit of Zionist and British dictated policies."

Since September 26, 2012, the Iranian foreign ministry advised all Iranian citizens against travelling to Canada due to increasing Islamophobia and Iranophobia. Furthermore, the ministry said that they have been cases of arrests and expulsions of Iranian expatriates under various pretexts and Iranians are deprived of their basic rights to continue with their ordinary activities, including the right to access their banking accounts and do ordinary transactions and that Iranians are murdered but not investigated in any significant way by Canadian police.

Israeli Prime Minister Benjamin Netanyahu praised Canada for the decision, calling it a "moral, courageous step" which sends a message to the international community that it can not allow "the dark regime in Iran to get nuclear weapons." Netanyahu called on other members of the international community to follow Canada's lead and "set moral and practical red lines" to Iran.

After the closure of the Canadian embassy, Italy agreed to serve as Canada's protecting power in Iran. On October 22, 2013, Oman agreed to serve Iranian interests in Canada at its embassy in Ottawa after providing services (July 2012 – October 2013) for the UK.

=== 2015–2025: Premiership of Justin Trudeau ===
Justin Trudeau said within the first month of the October 2015 election which brought him to power that he had plans to restore relations between the two nations, in the wake of the Iranian nuclear deal, which the outgoing Harper government had strongly opposed.

Following the implementation of the Joint Comprehensive Plan of Action agreement on 16 January 2016 by Iran and P5+1, the Canadian trade minister Chrystia Freeland announced on 5 February 2016 that they will lift economic sanctions against Iran, which will allow Canadian companies to do business with Iran but will maintain restrictions on exports relating to nuclear goods and technologies and anything that could help Iran in developing ballistic missiles. This also includes a list of individuals and companies that have associations with the Iranian government. In 2013 alone, the Canadian government (under Stephen Harper) has imposed a complete trade embargo on Iran and economic sanctions and travel restrictions against 78 individuals and 508 companies and organizations.

Canadian foreign minister Stéphane Dion has also supported the lifting of Canadian economic sanctions but voiced concerns about Iran's role in the Middle East, its standoff with Israel, its ballistic missile program and its worsening human rights record. In his March 2016 speech at the University of Ottawa, Dion said that breaking off diplomatic ties with Iran "had no positive consequences for anyone"—not for Canadians, not for Iranians, not for Israelis and not for global security. He has also made calls to start re-engaging with Iran in order "to play a useful role in that region of the world."

On June 13, 2019, Switzerland signed an agreement with Iran to serve as its protecting power in Canada.

==== Ukraine International Airlines Flight 752 ====
In January 2020, Iranian military forces shot down a passenger plane of Ukraine Airways after it took off from Tehran Khomeini Airport. The Iranian government later admitted that the plane was targeted after mistakenly being identified as an American cruise missile. This happened during heightened military tensions between Iran and the United States. On board the plane were a number of Canadian citizens and permanent residents. Canada strongly criticised the Iranian government.

==== 2022 Iranian protests ====
The death of Mahsa Amini took place. Amini was claimed to be wearing the hijab incorrectly and was detained. She was also allegedly beaten by police and she died in hospital on 16 September. Her death started a series of protests in Iran. During the protests, the police were seen attacking protesters. In Canada residents of Iranian descent were asking the Canadian government to address brutality in Iran. As a result of this, some Canadian politicians stated that they are together with Iranian protesters.

On 3 October 2022, the Canadian government officially sanctioned the IRGC. Foreign Affairs Minister Mélanie Joly announced sanctions targeting 9 entities, including the Morality Police and the Iranian Ministry of Intelligence and Security, and 25 individuals, that include high-ranking officials and members of the Islamic Revolutionary Guard Corps. These individuals include IRGC Commander-in-Chief Major General Hossein Salami, and Esmail Qaani, commander of the Quds Force of the IRGC.

On 7 October, the Canadian government expanded the sanctions, banning 10,000 members of the Islamic Revolutionary Guard Corps from entering the country permanently, which represents the top 50% of the organization's leadership. Canadian Prime Minister Justin Trudeau added that Canada plans to expand the sanctions against those most responsible for Iran's "egregious behavior". Canadian Deputy Prime Minister Chrystia Freeland added that Iran was a "state sponsor of terror", and that "it is oppressive, theocratic and misogynist; The IRGC leadership are terrorists, the IRGC is a terrorist organization".

==== 2023 ====
According to the UN's top tribunal, Iran took Canada to the International Court of Justice for "allowing victims of alleged terror attacks to claim damages from Tehran".

==== 2024 ====
On 19 June 2024, Public Safety Minister Dominic LeBlanc announced that Canada designated the IRGC as a terrorist organization under the nation's Criminal Code, citing “disregard for human rights” and “willingness to destabilize the international rules-based order.” Under this designation, thousands of senior Iranian government officials, including top IRGC officials, will be barred from entering Canada.

Iran strongly condemned the move, leading its Foreign Ministry to summon the Italian ambassador in Tehran, who represents Canadian interests in the country. In a statement, the ministry expressed Iran's “strong protest” over what it described as an “unlawful and internationally illegal” act by the Canadian government. The statement also warned of potential consequences and emphasized Iran's right to take necessary and reciprocal measures. According to the ministry, the Italian ambassador pledged to promptly convey the message to Canadian authorities. Spokesperson Nasser Kanaani called the move “hostile” and contrary to international law while the acting foreign minister Ali Bagheri said on X that the Canadian government will be responsible for the consequences of this provocative and irresponsible decision, referring to the designation.

=== 2025–Present: Premiership of Mark Carney ===
==== 2025 ====
In May 2025, Canada and Iran remained unlikely to resume diplomatic relations that has been severed since 2012, due to mutual distrust. Canada's foreign ministry demanded "significant changes" in Iran's behavior, citing its destabilizing Middle East activities, missile proliferation, nuclear opacity, and human rights violations, while urging compliance with IAEA obligations. Iran's Foreign Ministry Spokesperson Esmail Baghaei countered that Canada must lift sanctions first, accusing Ottawa of ignoring Israel's actions. Canada's 2024 designation of the IRGC as a terrorist group and March 2025 sanctions on IRGC-linked weapons production deepened tensions. This further deterioration of ties affected over 280,000 Iranian-Canadians.

On 31 July 2025, Canada joined thirteen allies in a joint statement condemning what they described as a surge in assassination, kidnapping and harassment plots by Iranian intelligence services in Europe and North America. In December 2025, Iran's Ministry of Foreign Affairs said that it had labeled the Royal Canadian Navy as a “terrorist organization.” Iran said this decision was a response to Canada's earlier move to list Iran's Islamic Revolutionary Guard Corps (IRGC) as a terrorist group. Iran referred to a 2019 law that allows it to take reciprocal actions and said that Canada's decision was against international law. Iran also stated that this law applied to the Royal Canadian Navy.

==== 2026 ====
On September 8, 2026, Iran criticized Canada after Ottawa condemned Iran's actions in the Middle East and said it would work with international partners to maintain pressure on Iran through sanctions and efforts to restore freedom of navigation in the Strait of Hormuz. Iranian Foreign Ministry spokesperson Esmaeil Baghaei accused Canada of Supporting U.S. military actions in the region.

On September 23, 2026, while attending the 81st session of the United Nations General Assembly in New York City, Prime Minister Mark Carney described Iran as "one of the greatest threats in the modern world" and said it posed an existential threat to Israel and its allies. Asked about Donald Trump's address to the Assembly the previous day, in which Trump said he had to choose between making a deal with Iran and destroying the Islamic Republic, Carney said that a war was already under way and that Trump was "speaking the language of war." On September 24, Iranian Foreign Ministry spokesperson Esmail Baghaei responded on X, accusing Carney of appeasing Washington and downplaying the threat rather than condemning U.S. military action.

== See also ==
- Iranian Canadian
