= Marc Dumais =

Canadian general

- Born: Parent, Quebec
- Military career
- Allegiance: Canada
- Branch: Royal Canadian Air Force
- Rank: Lieutenant General
- Commands: 1 Canadian Air Division; Canada Command
- Awards: Commander of the Order of Military Merit; Canadian Forces' Decoration

Lieutenant-General Marc J. Dumais, CMM, CD is a former Canadian Forces officer.

== Career ==
Dumais became Commander 1 Canadian Air Division on 2 August 2002 remaining in that post until 3 August 2004 before being appointed Commander of Canada Command on May 19, 2006.

Military offices
Preceded by J S Lucas	Commander of 1 Canadian Air Division; 2002 - 2004	Succeeded by J J C Bouchard
