= Combined Aerospace Operations Centre =

- Country: Canada
- Branch: Royal Canadian Air Force
- Part of: 1 Canadian Air Division
- Nickname: CAOC
- Engagements: 2026 Iran war

The Combined Aerospace Operations Centre is a Canadian military unit of the Royal Canadian Air Force.

== History ==
Combined Aerospace Operations Centre is currently attached to the 1 Canadian Air Division. In 2019, United States Air Force Brigadier-General Ed “Hertz” Vaughan implemented a new award for the CAOC known as the GRIT Award (Generous, Relentless, Innovative, Tough Award). According to Retired Major-General Denis Thompson, the CAOC has been providing intelligence support during the 2026 Iran war. According to a CBC News report citing the Canadian Department of National Defence's website, members of the CAOC were present at the Al Udeid Air Base in Qatar during the Iranian attack. On 3 March 2026, Canadian Defence Minister David McGuinty confirmed Canadian military presence in the Middle East and confirmed that they had not suffered any casualties. McGuinty also stated that the Canadian Armed Forces will “assess any potential impacts on CAF personnel in the region."
