= Embassy of Iran, Ottawa =

Iranian embassy in Canada

Embassy of the Islamic Republic of Iran in Ottawa
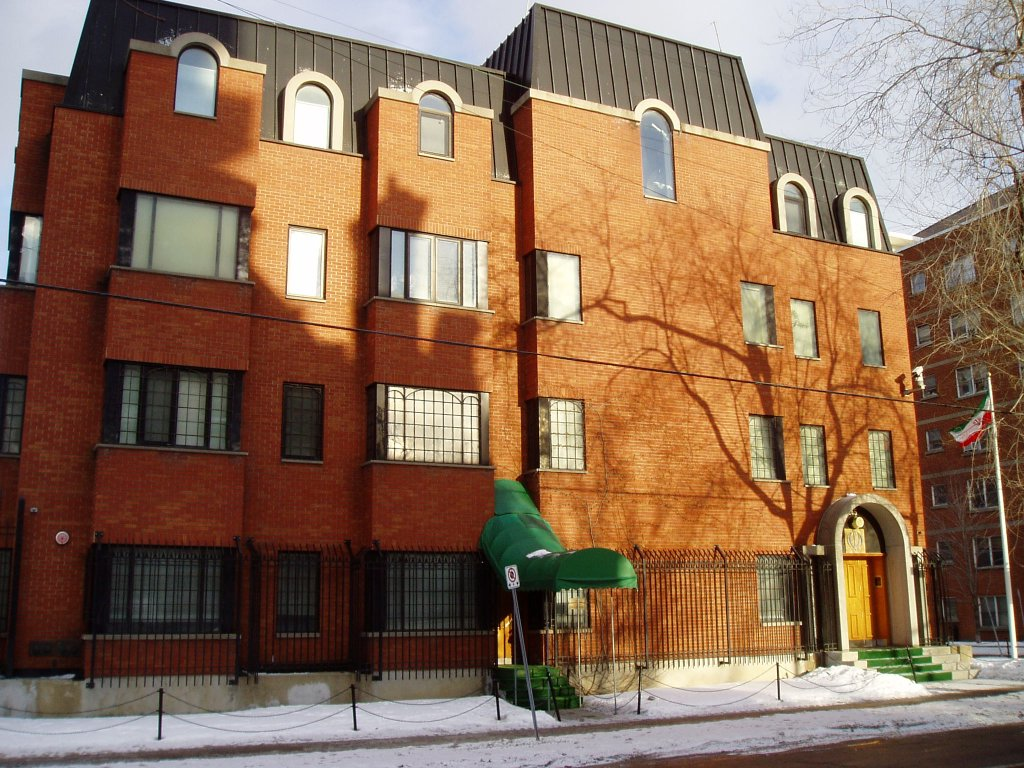
- Pictured in January 2005
- Location: Centretown, Ottawa
- Address: 245 Metcalfe Street
- Coordinates: 45.414691°N 75.689959°W
- Ambassador: vacant (since September 7, 2012)

The Embassy of the Islamic Republic of Iran in Ottawa, Ontario, Canada is the former diplomatic mission of Iranian government. It was located at 245 Metcalfe Street in the Centretown neighbourhood of Ottawa, across the street from the Booth House, currently home to the Laurentian Leadership Centre. Iran moved into the facilities in the summer of 1991; previously they had been based in a building on Roosevelt Avenue in Ottawa's west end. The ambassador lived in a house on Acacia Avenue in Rockcliffe Park, near Stornoway.

On September 7, 2012, the Canadian government announced it would expel all remaining Iranian diplomats in Canada within five days. As of September 17, 2012, Canadian interests in Iran are represented by the Italian Embassy in Tehran and the Canadian Embassy in Ankara.

== Attack ==
On April 5, 1992, the embassy was stormed by a group of Iranian dissidents. No one was seriously injured in the raid but the mob ransacked and destroyed much of the interior. Most of those responsible were later arrested.

The relationship between Iran and Canada has been strained in recent years due to a number of issues, including Iran's nuclear program and human rights abuses in Iran. In 2012, Canada closed its embassy in Tehran and expelled Iranian diplomats from Canada, citing concerns over the safety of Canadian diplomats in Iran and Iran's support for terrorist organizations. Iran responded by closing its embassy in Ottawa and expelling Canadian diplomats from Iran.

In January 2026, anti-regime protests took place on front of the closed embassy, with protestors removing its national emblem amid the ongoing widespread protests in Iran.

== See also ==
- Canada–Iran relations
