= 1 Canadian Air Division =

Canadian NORAD Region / 1 Canadian Air Division
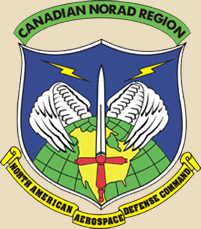
- Canadian NORAD Region emblem
- Active: July 31, 1997 – present
- Country: Canada
- Branch: Royal Canadian Air Force
- Type: Aerospace warning and aerospace control
- Role: The mission of the Canadian NORAD Region (CANR) is to provide aerospace surveillance, identification, control and warning for the defence of Canada and North America.
- Size: Headquarters has 600 regular and reserve force members
- Part of: Part of North American Aerospace Defense Command (NORAD)
- Garrison/HQ: CFB Winnipeg, Manitoba, Canada (1 April 1997 – present); North Bay, Ontario, Canada (1 June 1983 – 31 March 1997)
- Motto: Per ardua ad astra (Latin for 'through adversity to the stars')
- Colors: Blue, green, yellow, and silver
- Anniversaries: 1 October 1952
- Website: www.canada.ca/en/air-force/corporate/who-we-are/organizational-structure/1-canadian-air-division.html

Commanders
- 1 CAD/Canadian NORAD Region Commander: Major-General Chris McKenna
- 1 CAD/Canadian NORAD Region Chief Warrant Officer: Chief Warrant Officer Dan Campbell
- Roundel

- Fin flash

Aircraft flown
- Fighter: McDonnell_Douglas_CF-18_Hornet
- Helicopter: CH-113 Labrador, CH-124 Sea King, CH-139 JetRanger, CH-146 Griffon, CH-147 Chinook, CH-148 Cyclone, CH-149 Cormorant, CH-178 Hip
- Patrol: CP-140 Aurora, CP-140A Arcturus
- Reconnaissance: CU-170 Heron
- Trainer: CT-114 Tutor, CT-133 Silver Star, CT-142 Dash-8, CT-145 King Air, CT-155 Hawk, CT-156 Harvard II
- Transport: CC-109 Cosmopolitan, CC-115 Buffalo, CC-130 Hercules, CC-130J Super Hercules, CC-137, CC-138 Twin Otter, CC-144 Challenger, CC-150 Polaris, CC-177 Globemaster, CC-295 Kingfisher, CC-330 Husky

1 Canadian Air Division (1 Cdn Air Div) (French: 1^{re} Division aérienne du Canada) is the operational-level command and control formation of the Royal Canadian Air Force (RCAF). Prior to 2006 the official abbreviation for the division was 1 CAD. It is commanded by an air force major-general.

== History ==
=== Timeline ===
- 1951: On 1 November, 1 Wing is formed at North Luffenham, England. It is in support of the Royal Air Force.
- 1952: No. 1 Air Division (RCAF) is formed in Paris on 1 October, initially equipped with the Canadair F-86 Sabre
- 1952: On 1 October, 2 Wing is formed at Grostenquin, France, the first Wing under 1 Air Division.
- 1956: The first CF-100 Canucks, with 445 Squadron, arrive at the Air Division. Three more CF-100 squadrons will follow, each replacing a Sabre squadron.
- 1963: The first CF-104-equipped Wing, 3 Wing, becomes operational on 27 May.
- 1970: On 1 July, 1 Canadian Air Group (CAG) is formed. It is equipped with the CF-104 and the T-33 Silver Star as a training aircraft.
- 1985: On 10 June the first CF-188 Hornet, destined for 409 Squadron, arrives at CFB Baden-Soellingen.
- 1988: 1 Canadian Air Group is reorganized as No. 1 Canadian Air Division on 28 May at CFB Lahr. It has two component formations, 3 (Fighter) Wing at CFB Lahr and 4 (Fighter) Wing at CFB Baden-Soellingen
- 1994: As the Canadian Armed Forces prepares to close its European bases, No. 1 Canadian Air Division is officially disbanded on 31 July.
- 1997: 1 Canadian Air Division is reactivated in Winnipeg on 31 July

=== Formation (1952–1967) ===
After NATO was formed on 4 April 1949, a planning committee examined what NATO required to meet the increasing Soviet threat to western Europe and the new alliance. After the war, most European NATO members had very limited air forces, which given the Soviet threat, required a rapid increase in size. The Canadian government was initially hesitant to provide personnel to reinforce NATO in western Europe. But on 28 December 1950 the Cabinet accepted NATO’s recommendations for a brigade group and 11 squadrons of aircraft. The plan at this time was for an air division equipped with F-86 and CF-100 aircraft. This changed several times. Eventually, the air division had 12 fighter squadrons, initially equipped with the North American F-86 Sabre and then eight with the Sabre and four with the Avro CF-100 Canuck.

The RCAF deployed a planning team to Paris, France, in early January 1952 to create the headquarters for the planned RCAF contribution to the air defence of western Europe. 1 Air Division Headquarters was formed in Paris on 1 October 1952. With this, a new formation was created that would increase in size and capability over the next few years. Once a new facility was found at Metz, France, the headquarters officially transferred there and began operations on 13 April 1953. The air division headquarters made one last move, to Lahr, West Germany on 1 April 1967.

Operationally, the air division reported to NATO’s Fourth Allied Tactical Air Force (4 ATAF). This formation included United States and French bases and units. In turn 4 ATAF was under the command and control of Allied Air Forces Central Europe (AAFCE). This remained the case throughout the existence of 1 Air Division.

Even before air division headquarters was formed, the RCAF had a formation in Europe. This was 1 Wing, located at North Luffenham, England, operating in support of the Royal Air Force. The wing was authorized on 1 November 1951, with 410 Squadron. 441 Squadron followed and then 439 Squadron. The first two squadrons were transported by ship to Glasgow, Scotland. 439 Squadron flew their Sabres across the North Atlantic in Operation Leap Frog I in May–June 1952. Subsequent squadrons followed this route. 1 Wing transferred to Marville, France, on 1 March 1955 and then to Lahr, West Germany, on 1 April 1967.

As more squadrons were formed in Canada, they were deployed to Europe as an entire wing. 2 Wing, composed of 416, 421 and 430 Squadrons crossed the North Atlantic on Operation Leap Frog II in September–October 1952. They then arrived at Grostenquin, France, the wing being formed on 1 October 1952.

Operation Leap Frog III, in March–April 1953 brought 3 Wing’s squadrons to Zweibrücken, West Germany. 3 Wing was authorized on 2 February 1953 and was composed of 413, 427 and 434 Squadrons.

The last air division wing to arrive in Europe was 4 Wing, which was authorized on 1 July 1953. Located at Baden-Soellingen, West Germany, its three squadrons were 414, 422 and 444, who came to Europe on Operation Leap Frog IV in August–September 1953.

Initially, all four air division wings were equipped with the North American F-86 Sabre, with most being built at Canadair in Montreal. The first three wings were all initially equipped with the Sabre 2, while 4 Wing arrived in West Germany with the Sabre 4. As Canadair made improvements to the Sabre, No. 1 Overseas Ferry Unit flew these latest Sabres across the North Atlantic under the name Operation Random. The Sabre 5 began to arrive at the Air Division in February 1954 and the Sabre 6 in April 1955. The procedure was for one squadron at each wing to receive the newest model before the next squadrons at each wing.

Once each wing was operational, there were regular exercises. Some were created by the wings, others by the air division and some were 4 ATAF. There was also normally a NATO-wide exercise annually that involved deploying to a remote wartime airfield. These exercises maintained the skills of the RCAF’s pilots. There were also regular deployments to the air weapons ranges, first at Rabat, Morocco, and starting on 1 March 1957 at the Decimomannu Air Weapons Unit, Sardinia.

==== CF-100 Canuck ====
As Warsaw Pact air capabilities increased and NATO needed an all-weather air defence aircraft, Canada committed four squadrons of Canucks to the air division. These were flown by the respective squadrons across the North Atlantic under the name Operation Nimble Bat. With the arrival of each Canuck squadron, a Sabre squadron was disbanded, keeping the number of squadrons at 12.

At 1 Wing, 445 Squadron replaced 410 Squadron in October 1956; at 2 Wing it was 423 Squadron that replaced 416 Squadron in January 1957, 440 Squadron replaced 413 Squadron at 3 Wing in April 1957, and 419 Squadron replaced 414 Squadron at 4 Wing in July 1957.

==== Zulu alert ====
In the air defence role, there was always one section of four Sabres on “Zulu Alert,” ready to identify any aircraft or assist those in need of assistance. 1 and 3 Wings would alternate weekly with 2 and 4 Wings. Two alert sections of Sabres were to be maintained at each wing from 30 minutes before sunrise to 30 minutes after sunset. These aircraft were on five minutes’ readiness with starter units attached. The pilots did not need to be in the cockpit but needed to be immediately available in flying gear. As for the CF-100s, two aircraft had to be available on 10 minutes notice, with starters connected and pilots available in flying gear from 30 minutes before sunset to 30 minutes after sunrise. On weekends each wing not on Zulu alert had to maintain one section of four F-86 and two CF-100s on one hour availability. Other aircraft had to be on 30 minutes availability.

While any pilot could fire upon an aircraft in self-defence, the order to open fire would normally be given by the 1 Air Division duty operations officer through 61 Aircraft Control and Warning Squadron.

==== Guynemer Trophy ====
The Sabres in the hands of RCAF pilots were an outstanding combination. In 1958 the French Dassault Aviation Company donated a trophy for the first Allied Air Forces Central Europe-sponsored Air to Air Gunnery Championship. The Guynemer Trophy, named after French First World War ace Georges Marie Ludovic Jules Guynemer, was presented to the highest scoring team while individual scores were also recognized. The competition consisted of a cine gun portion and then a live gunnery portion.

The RCAF team involved five select pilots plus groundcrew. It usually numbered around 40 personnel in total. From 1958 to 1961, the RCAF team took first place. In 1962 the last Guynemer Trophy competition was held using machine guns and cannons. The RCAF team came second behind a RAF team.

- 1958 – a mixed Air Division team. An RCAF took top individual scoring honours.
- 1959 – a mixed Air Division team. The three top places in individual scoring went to three RCAF pilots.
- 1960 – a mixed Air Division team took first place with 1357 points, 100 points ahead of a RAF team. RCAF pilots took the top two places in individual scoring.
- 1961 – a team from 4 Wing took first place with 1,352 points. In second place was the Belgian Air Force team with 1,106 points. RCAF pilots came first and third in the individual shooting category.

==== Aerobatic teams ====
The abilities of the Air Division’s pilots was reflected in another, more public manner – air display teams, for which the F-86 Sabre was an ideal aircraft. 1 Wing had an aerobatics team in 1952, 1953 and 1954, while 410 Squadron had their own in 1952 and 1953. 439 and 441 Squadrons each had one as well in 1954. In 1954, 3 Wing had the Fireballs, distinctive in their all-red livery, while in 1955 4 Wing had the Sky Lancers. A tragic accident on 2 March 1956 killed four Sky Lancers pilots during a training session and halted aerobatics in the Air Division for many years. No other wing was therefore able to generate its own air display team.

==== Other units ====
The four Wings and 12 flying squadrons were not the only units in the Air Division. It was an organization that made itself relatively self-sufficient in many aspects of operational support. Most had been considered and were formed almost from the start of the Air Division’s operations, indicative of the high level of preparation that went into the creation of the Air Division.

==== 30 Air Materiel Base ====
With Air Division formations to be located at four different locations in Europe, there was a need for a unit to provide the logistical support for the Air Division. 30 Air Materiel Base was formed at the former RAF Langar on 1 August 1952. It initially belonged to Air Materiel Command but on 1 September 1953 was transferred to the Air Division. By the end of November 1952, 312 Supply Depot, 314 Technical Support Unit and 137 (Transport) Flight had begun operations. This was on a limited basis as facilities were built. By December 1954 there was also an RCAF Movements Unit at Langar.

137 (Transport) Flight provided rapid logistical support from the supply units at Langar to the RCAF formations on the continent as well as transporting squadron personnel to various locations such as the Decimomannu Air Weapons Range. It operated various types of aircraft including Douglas Dakotas and Bristol Freighters. No. 312 Supply Depot managed the supply of medical items and spares for mechanical equipment, including aircraft and vehicles. No. 314 Technical Services Unit managed outside contracts and inspected all supplies before they were forwarded to operational bases. By the end of 1953 the units at 30 Air Materiel Base were fully operational. With the reduction in forces throughout the Canadian forces underway in the early 1960s and the concept of providing support from Canada, 30 AMB was disbanded in August 1963 although the Langar site was not completely evacuated until 31 March 1964. August 1963 also saw 137 Flight disbanded and its aircraft transferred to 109 Communication Flight.

==== 109 Communications Flight ====
109 Communications Flight was originally formed as the 1 Air Division Communications Flight. On 1 April 1954 it was reorganized under the new name and located at No. 2 Wing, Grostenquin. The Flight was formed to provide transportation and practice flying facilities for staff officers as well as to transport RCAF personnel attached to NATO. 109 Communications Flight was also tasked to provide Ground Control Approach quarterly checks at the four Air Division Wings. At this time the flight used at least one Dakota.

109 Communications Flight was redesignated as 109 Composite Unit in August 1963 when it received the aircraft and equipment of 137 (Transport) Flight. It also assumed some of the latter’s roles. The flight moved to Marville by 31 March 1964 when 2 Wing was disbanded. The Unit moved to Lahr, and was disbanded on 1 April 1971.

==== Movements units ====
Personnel arriving or departing the Air Division or the Canadian contribution to the NATO headquarters required a coordinating unit. Initially this was performed by two units: Movements Unit Paris and Movements Unit Langar. By December 1955 the unit in Paris was renamed 6 Movements Unit, and the one in Langar 5 Movements Unit. With the change-over from primarily trans-Atlantic surface to air transport in support of the Air Division, 6 Movements Unit was disbanded on 31 December 1961. At the same time 5 Movements Unit was moved from Langar to Marville and redesignated 5 Air Movements Unit as of 1 January 1962. On 2 March 1967 it moved to Lahr. 5 Air Movements Unit remained active until 1 April 1992 at which time it was disbanded and its roles transferred to a new unit, 1 Air Transport Unit.

==== 601 Radio Relay / Telecommunications Squadron ====
The RCAF created its own communications system connecting the four Wings, 30 Air Materiel Base and other units with Air Division Headquarters. Based at Metz, 601 telecommunications Relay Squadron was active by late 1954 and had sites at Angevillers, Metz and Zimming, France as well as dets at each wing as well as at St. Hubert, Belgium, and Wintersberg, West Germany. In April 1956 the unit was renamed 601 Radio Relay Squadron. On 1 September 1958 it was renamed 601 Telecommunications Squadron. With unification of the three services underway by 1964, and reductions being the main goal, 601 Telecommunications Squadron was merged with 1 Wing Telecommunications in August 1967.

==== 5 Field Technical Training Unit ====
In the early 1950s the RCAF created field technical training units to provide hands-on training for technicians close to where the technicians would be serving. 5 Field Technical Training Unit (5 FTTU) was operating by the end of 1954, located at 3 Wing. 5 FTTU trained technicians in the field on the F-86 Sabre. Although it is unknown when the unit was disbanded, it was still part of 3 Wing in May 1964. This was beyond the date that the F-86 was in service in the Air Division, although some were still in use in Canada.

==== 61 Aircraft Control and Warning Squadron ====
The Air Division’s radar unit was 61 Aircraft Control and Warning Squadron. Formed on 1 July 1955 at Metz, France, its role was to provide radar control of 1 Air Division aircraft and for NATO aircraft as required. It would also augment NATO’s early warning capability. The squadron continued in this role until it was disbanded at 12:00 PM on 31 December 1962.

==== 6 Tactical Air Control Centre / Combat Operations Centre ====
The Air Division had a separate unit to control the operational missions of the Sabres. The first separate unit was 6 Tactical Asir Control Centre (TACC), formed on 1 January 1958. Its roles were to control and coordinate the tactical operations of 1 Air Division fighter aircraft, the air defence assigned to the Air Division, and the forces assigned to operational air training exercises. It also had to maintain and liaise with adjacent TACCs and sector commanders. The RCAF was thus following the example of other NATO forces on creating a separate unit to control operations.

61 Aircraft Control and Warning Squadron operated in cooperation with 6 TACC. The former provided the information on tracks and the latter assessed and provided direction on the appropriate response. For example, the two participated in the Tuesday Scrimmage exercises, which served as a warm-up to participation in larger exercises. 6 TACC would be amalgamated with the Combat Operations Centre on 1 October 1959. This was to provide more effective control of the Air Division’s fighter aircraft.

On 27 March 1963 the Combat Operations Centre was renamed the 1 Air Division Operations Centre, made at the request of the Air Division Headquarters. A further change was made on 1 July 1964 when the Operations Centre was disbanded and its roles assumed by staff of 1 Air Division Headquarters. In part this was because of the changes underway within the headquarters because of the pending arrival of the CF-104 Starfighter. With this the Air Division lost a separate unit that controlled aircraft operations.

==== RCAF Air Weapons Units ====
In late 1953 the Air Division began negotiations with the French Air Force (FAF) to use the FAF base at Rabat Sale in Morocco. In January 1954 an agreement was reached and on 21 January an advance party arrived at Rabat. The new unit was named 1 Air Division RCAF Rabat Detachment. By March the first Air Division squadrons began to deploy for two to three weeks of live air gunnery training. Actual firing was conducted over the eastern Atlantic Ocean. There was an Air Division squadron almost continually at Rabat Sale through to 1956. By this time the RCAF was in discussions with the German Air Force and the Italian Air Force for the construction of an air weapons range at Decimomannu on the island of Sardinia.

The RCAF Air Weapons Unit, Decimomannu was formed on 1 March 1957. As with Rabat, there was an RCAF detachment that managed the operations of the RCAF’s squadrons’ deployments. Operations continued at Decimomannu into the RCAF Starfighter era. At the end of July 1970 the unit was closed.

=== Starfighter years start ===
By the late 1950s the Canucks and Sabres were approaching the end of their service as they were becoming outdated. At the same time NATO faced the dilemma of how to combat the overwhelming conventional forces threat they faced from the Warsaw Pact. As early as November 1954 NATO recommended the use of nuclear weapons in defence from the start of a conflict.

On 2 July 1959 the Canadian government announced that they would re-equip the eight Sabre squadrons in the Air Division with Lockheed F-104 Starfighters, to be built in Canada at Canadair. In support of NATO’s contemporary operational requirements, they would be given the nuclear strike/attack, and reconnaissance roles. The nuclear weapons would be under the control of the United States and would be released for the RCAF to use only with American approval.

The RCAF’s plans for the Air Division were that 439 and 441 Squadrons at 1 Wing would have the strike/reconnaissance role but no nuclear weapons. The remaining six squadrons, 421, 422, 427, 430, 434, and 444, would take on the strike/attack role and be equipped with US tactical nuclear weapons. Politics intervened.

In 1962 the disagreement between the governments of France and the United States on the storage of nuclear weapons in France reached new heights. France wished to have full control of all nuclear weapons stored on its territory; the United States did not wish to allow this. As a result, the United States decided to pull all nuclear weapons from France, although this did not happen right away. This meant that all NATO nations that were equipped with American nuclear weapons had to move out of France.

The result was that the two squadrons at 2 Wing would move as they were to be so-equipped. 421 Squadron transferred to 4 Wing and 430 to 3 Wing, both of which occurred in February 1964. 3 Wing would thus be composed of 427, 430 and 434 Squadrons and 4 Wing of 421, 422 and 444 Squadrons. At the same time, 2 Wing at Grostenquin would be disbanded.

On 12 October 1962 the first CF-104 arrived in Europe. An RCAF C-130 Hercules delivered a CF-104 every three days, direct from the Canadair plant at Cartierville on the island of Montreal. The three squadrons at 3 Wing became operational by 27 May 1963. It was then the turn of 4 Wing to receive their Starfighters, becoming operational by 2 December 1963. 1 Wing was operational by 2 March 1964.

Despite becoming operational only in 1963–1964, the RCAF Starfighter pilots quickly showed their capabilities. At NATO’s tactical weapons meet in June 1965, RCAF pilots were national winners in the strike role and even won the high individual-score trophy in the strike event. In 1966 an RCAF pilot won the trophy for the highest individual score in the strike competition.

In 1966 the two reconnaissance squadrons of 1 Wing participated in their first Royal Flush reconnaissance competition. In only their fourth year of competition, in May 1969, 441 Squadron placed first and 439 Squadron was second. Then in May 1970, 439 came in first.

==== Aerobatics teams ====
As with their Sabre predecessors, the Starfighter squadrons had their own aerobatics teams. Between 1966 and 1979, 421, 430, 439 and 441 Squadrons, as well as 1 Canadian Air Group from 1978 to 1983, had teams.

=== Reorganization (1967–1993) ===
In March 1966 the French government announced that it was withdrawing its forces from NATO’s operational control. Further, any NATO forces that remained in France after 1 April 1967 would either come under French operational command or would be forced to leave. In February 1967, the Canadian and French governments reached an agreement for the Air Division to take over the French base at Lahr West Germany. 1 Wing’s move there was completed by 1 April 1967.

These were not the only changes within 1 Canadian Air Division. Due to attrition, the number of CF-104s was gradually reduced. At the same time there had been a long-planned reduction of Canadian forces in Europe. By 1967 there were not enough to keep all eight squadrons up to full strength. As a result, 434 Squadron was deactivated on 1 March 1967 and 444 followed on 1 April. While the total number of aircraft removed from 1 Air Division service was only 24, the Air Division’s contribution to 4 ATAF’s all-weather strike capability was a significant 20 percent.

Further consolidation occurred on 1 July 1969 when 3 Wing was closed as part of the government’s austerity plan. In preparation, 427 Squadron moved to Baden in June 1969 and 430 Squadron moved to Lahr in February 1969.

The changes did not slow down exercises or operational preparedness. The nuclear weapons required annual tactical evaluations to ensure each squadron met standards required to safely handle nuclear weapons. 3 and 4 Wings first became operationally ready on 1 July 1964 and would remain so throughout the period that they remained in the nuclear role. The squadrons of the Air Division were the only ones in 4 ATAF to attain the highest rating in tactical evaluations, all three wings achieving this in 1966. The nuclear role also required each wing to have four aircraft on 15 minutes quick reaction alert status, each with their nuclear weapon loaded. At higher levels of readiness it was 12 aircraft per wing in 6 hours while full generation required 25 aircraft per wing in 12 hours. Such levels of availability required a high level of maintenance and effort from support personnel.

Training for such missions required practice at the Decimomannu Range. In 1968, the CF-104 pilots dropped 14,180 bombs and ballistic drop shapes, practice weapons designed to mimic the B43 nuclear weapons, then deployed to the two wings, that the squadrons were to use in wartime.

=== 1 Canadian Air Group ===
On 1 February 1968 the three Canadian services were unified and the RCAF disappeared. The Air Division continued to exist, but changes were underway as the Canadian Forces were being reorganized. This was the result of reductions in the defence establishment, which would continue for the future. As a result, on 31 August 1969, 3 Wing, Zweibruecken was disbanded. Planning was also underway for the dissolution of 1 Wing and 4 Wing.

The next years saw major changes. On 1 May 1970 the number of pilots at each of the two reconnaissance squadrons was reduced from 24 to 16 while all squadrons saw their single seat CF-104 A and dual seat CF-104 D aircraft reduced from 18 to 14. This also allowed a reduction in the number of support personnel.

430 Squadron was disbanded on 1 May, with 422 and 427 Squadrons following on 1 July. 441 Squadron changed its role to strike/attack on 1 May while on 1 July 439 Squadron followed. On 1 July 1970, 439 and 441 Squadrons moved to Baden from Lahr. While there were no CF-104s now at Lahr, in the event of war, one CF-104 squadron would deploy there, as well as two USAF F-4 Phantom squadrons.

The air force formations also changed on 1 July. 1 Air Division was disbanded.as were 1 and 4 Wings. The Air Division was renamed 1 Canadian Air Group, based in Lahr. 1 CAG reported to a new formation – CFB Europe. Which was composed of two locations: CFB Europe (Lahr), the former CFB Europe (Baden), the former 4 Wing. All of this came under a new formation – Canadian Forces Europe (CFE) Headquarters. CFE was organized into 4 Canadian Mechanized Brigade Group (4 CMBG), CFB Europe and 1 Canadian Air Group. 4 CMBG began the move to Lahr and Baden in late 1970, turning over their bases along the Rhine to the British Army starting in September 1970 and continuing into June 1971. Despite all the changes, the new 1 Canadian Air Group maintained the highest possible tactical rating during NATO’s tactical evaluation in April 1971.

There was also a new unit for the air force in West Germany. 1 Canadian Air Group Maintenance Squadron was formed at Baden on 30 November 1971 from 4 Wing’s Central Aircraft Maintenance organization. It was renamed 1 Air Maintenance Squadron on 1 September 1983. The squadron provided first and second line maintenance support to the three CF-104 squadrons.

Thus, by the end of 1970, 1 Canadian Air Group consisted of three CF-104 squadrons at CFB Europe (Baden), 421, 439 and 441 Squadrons, as well as 1 Canadian Air Group Maintenance Squadron. 5 Air Movement Unit operated at CFB Europe (Lahr), with this base remaining the hub for all Canadian military air traffic between Canada and Europe, which it had been since April 1967.

There was still one major change to come. On 31 December 1971, the nuclear role was removed from the Starfighters and they now assumed a conventional attack role. This was the result of a Government of Canada decision to remove all nuclear weapons from its capabilities. Planning for this was underway for some time, with 632 MK-82 bombs being acquired in June 1971 while the pilots of the two CF-104 squadrons began the transition to conventional weapons in the last months of 1971. 439 Squadron would make the transition from reconnaissance to conventional attack on 1 July 1972.

After all these changes in 1970 and 1971 all Canadian air operations were concentrated at Baden-Soellingen. The exception was 444 Tactical Helicopter Squadron which operated from Lahr under the command and control of the Army’s 10 Tactical Air Group. The three CF-104 squadrons continued to take part in all NATO exercises, such as Royal Flush, the Tactical Air Weapons Meet, Big Click, and Front Centre as well as a local “top gun” competitions and squadron exchanges with other NATO air forces.

==== 412 Squadron Detachment ====
With the disbandment of 109 Communications Flight in 1971, 412 Squadron established a detachment at Lahr on 1 April 1971. The det was equipped with the CC-109 Cosmopolitan. The detachment would then operate two De Havilland Canada DASH-7 starting in April 1987. Two DASH-8s took over in April 1987, with two DASH-8 starting operations in April 1987. They returned to Canada in April 1990 and one Cosmo returned to continue air transport service for 1 Canadian Air Division. 412 Squadron’s detachment was closed on 1 April 1992 and air operations continued with 1 Air Transport Unit.

=== CF-188 Years start ===
On 10 April 1980 the Government of Canada announced that the McDonnell Douglas F-18 would replace the Starfighters, as well as McDonnell Douglas CF-101 Voodoos and the Northrup CF-118 Freedom Fighters. The first CF-188 Hornet unit at Baden was 409 Squadron, its first Hornets arriving on 6 June 1985. The first Starfighter squadron to transition to the CF-188 Hornet was 439 Squadron, on 29 November 1985. 421 Squadron, was next, officially reformed as a Hornet squadron on 22 July 1986. A parade on 1 March 1986 marked the official last day of CF-104 operational use in the Canadian Forces, with 441 Squadron conducting the fly-past. 441 Squadron would transition to the CF-188 but remain at CFB Cold Lake. The arrival of the CF-188 also brought the return of the aerobatic display. In this case it was a solo pilot, operating from 1985 to 1990 from Baden.

=== 1 Canadian Air Division ===
With these major changes complete, on 28 May 1988, 1 Canadian Air Group was deactivated and 1 Canadian Air Division activated. It was based at Lahr and reported to Canadian Force Europe Headquarters. It consisted of the headquarters and 3 (Fighter) Wing at Lahr, and 4 (Fighter) Wing, with 409, 421 and 439 Squadrons, and 1 Air Maintenance Squadron at Baden. In the event of war or mobilization, two CF-188 squadrons from Canada, known as the Rapid Reinforcement Squadrons, would deploy to 3 Wing along with 2 Air Maintenance Squadron, to support 1 Canadian Air Division. At the same time, one of the CF-188 squadrons in Baden would deploy to Lahr while two CF-188 squadrons would remain at Baden along with 1 Air Maintenance Squadron and an electronic warfare software support facility.

==== Gulf War ====
After Iraq invaded Kuwait on 2 August 1990 and the United Nations authorized action to eject the invaders the Government of Canada announced on 14 September that 409 Squadron, with augmentation from 421 and 439 Squadrons, was slated to participate. Operation Scimitar started on 15 September 1990 and was replaced on 6 November when it was incorporated into Operation Friction. In mid-December they were replaced with personnel from 421 and 439 Squadrons in Baden and 416 Squadron in Cold Lake. They would be the first Canadian air force personnel to fire at an enemy in anger since the Korean War.

1 Canadian Air Division was heavily involved in the conflict outside of its fighter squadrons. 5 Air Movements Unit was augmented with personnel from Canada as the volume of its traffic increased dramatically. Not only were there personnel to support transiting from Canada to the Gulf, and the transshipment of equipment and supplies from Canada, but there were supplies to gather in Europe and then ship. This included shipping the munitions (Operation UNCLENCHED FIST) for American forces in the Persian Gulf and for the CF-188s (Operation IRON SABRE), and the supplies needed for the clean-up of the Iraqi-cause oil spill in the Gulf (Operation SPONGE).Altogether, over 4,650 personnel and more than 5,254 tonnes of equipment and supplies passed through 1 Canadian Air Division.

With the end of the Cold War and reductions in the size of the Canadian Forces, 409 Squadron was deactivated on 25 June 1991. The Air Division was also transferred on 1 January 1991, from being part of Canadian Forces Europe to Air Command. This would allow the air force greater control of the dissolution of air assets. 3 Wing and its headquarters were disbanded on 31 January 1992; 5 Air Movements Unit on 31 March, 1 Air Maintenance Squadron on 26 April and finally 421 Squadron on 1 June. On 31 July 1994 1 Canadian Air Division, CFB Baden, 4 Fighter Wing and its headquarters and 439 Squadron were disbanded. Many of the closing ceremonies had occurred before then. With this, 1 Canadian Air Division ceased to exist.

=== New 1 Canadian Air Division ===
While government-mandated downsizing had shut down 1 Air Division in Europe, it caused its recreation in Canada. The Defence 1994 White Paper mandated the elimination of one layer of headquarters and the reduction of headquarters staff by one-third. As Air Command sought to find ways to economize manpower, the groups that controlled operational fleets were selected as the next organizations to be reduced. In September 1996 a 1 Canadian Air Division shadow staff was formed to work out the procedures for assuming the group responsibilities.

On 24 June 1997, an organization message was issued authorizing the disbandment of Air Command Headquarters, and the various groups, and the creation of 1 Canadian Air Division. This was merely a formality as some groups had already started disbanding earlier in June. This continued into July, with some functions being taken over by wings and others transferred to the shadow 1 Canadian Air Division headquarters. On 31 July 1997 Air Command Headquarters officially stood down in a parade held in Winnipeg. At the same the new 1 Canadian Air Division was stood up as was the Air Staff in Ottawa. The new Air Division incorporated the functions of five former groups: Fighter Group, Air Transport Group, 10 Tactical Air Group, Maritime Air Group and Air Reserve Group. The new Air Division was directly responsible for the 13 wings across Canada as well as the Aerospace Telecommunications Engineering Support Squadron, Central Flying School and Canadian Component – NATO Airborne Early Warning Force. It also performed the functions of the Canadian NORAD Region (CANR) Headquarters.

1 Canadian Air Division presided over many events and changes. International operations had become an important part of the Government of Canada’s foreign policy, including in the former Yugoslavia and later in air combat operations in Libya and against the Islamic State of Iraq and Syria, and in support of coalition operations in Afghanistan. Support to international humanitarian operations have also been a major undertaking such as the 1998 Honduras hurricane, the 2004 Boxing Day Tsunami, the 2010 Haiti earthquake and the 2013 Philippines typhoon. There have been other challenges. Aircraft fleets were aging with many needing to be replaced. Of perhaps great significance was the issue of reductions. The entire trade structure had to be revamped to make better use of the fewer trades personnel after the cuts of the 1990s. The pilot training system was revamped with the acceptance of contracted pilot training

As the RCAF has reorganized, 1 Canadian Air Division has also reduced its operational role and footprint. On 25 June 2009, 2 Canadian Air Division was stood up. It provided the oversight for training and education in the RCAF. 2 Canadian Air Division took over the command and control of 15 Wing (Moose Jaw), 16 Wing (Borden) and 17 Wing (Winnipeg)

Today based in Winnipeg, Manitoba, the division is also the headquarters for the Canadian NORAD Region (CANR), commands 11 of the RCAF's 13 wings, and oversees the monitoring of Canada's airspace in support of the nation's commitments to the North American Aerospace Defence Command (NORAD). The division is staffed by 600 regular and reserve force members. In addition to military personnel the headquarters is also assisted by civilian personnel in the Operational Research and Analysis Directorate (ORAD).

The Combined Aerospace Operations Centre of the 1 Canadian Air Division has provided intelligence support during the 2026 Iran war.

== Structure ==
=== Order of Battle, January 1959 ===
- 1 Air Division, RCAF Metz
  - RCAF Support Unit RCAF Metz
  - 1 Fighter Wing, RCAF Marville
    - 445 All Weather (Fighter) Squadron
    - 439 (Fighter) Squadron
    - 441 (Fighter) Squadron
  - 2 Fighter Wing, RCAF Grostenquin
    - 423 All Weather (Fighter) Squadron
    - 421 (Fighter) Squadron
    - 430 (Fighter) Squadron
    - 109 Communications Flight
  - 3 Fighter Wing, RCAF Zweibruecken
    - 440 All Weather (Fighter) Squadron
    - 427 (Fighter) Squadron
    - 434 (Fighter) Squadron
    - 5 Field Technical Training Unit
  - 4 Fighter Wing, RCAF Baden-Soelllingen
    - 419 All Weather (Fighter) Squadron
    - 422 (Fighter) Squadron
    - 444 (Fighter) Squadron
  - 30 Air Materiel Base, RCAF Langar
    - 312 Supply Depot
    - 314 Technical Services Unit
    - 137 Transport Flight
    - 5 Movements Unit
  - 6 Movements Unit, Paris
  - 601 Telecom Squadron, RCAF Metz
  - 61 Aircraft Control and Warning Squadron, RCAF Metz
  - RCAF Air Weapons Unit, Decimomannu, Sardinia
  - 6 Tactical Air Control Centre, RCAF Metz
  - Advisory Group, Oldenburg

=== Order of Battle, February 1964 ===
- 1 Air Division, RCAF Metz
  - RCAF Support Unit RCAF Metz
  - 1 Fighter Wing, RCAF Marville
    - 439 (Reconnaissance/Attack) Squadron
    - 441 (Reconnaissance/Attack) Squadron
    - 109 Communications Flight
    - 5 Movements Unit
  - 2 Fighter Wing, RCAF Grostenquin (disbands 31 July 1964)
  - 3 Fighter Wing, RCAF Zweibruecken
    - 427 (Strike/Attack) Squadron
    - 430 (Strike/Attack) Squadron
    - 434 (Strike/Attack) Squadron
    - 5 Field Technical Training Unit
  - 4 Fighter Wing, RCAF Baden-Soelllingen
    - 421 (Strike/Attack) Squadron
    - 422 (Strike/Attack) Squadron
    - 444 (Strike/Attack) Squadron
  - 601 Telecom Squadron, RCAF Metz
  - RCAF Air Weapons Unit, Decimomannu, Sardinia
  - 1 Air Division Operations Centre, RCAF Metz

=== Order of battle, 1989 ===
- No. 1 Canadian Air Division, CFB Baden–Soellingen, in war under Fourth Allied Tactical Air Force
  - 4 Wing CFB Baden-Söllingen
    - 4 Wing Operations
    - 4 Communication and Air Traffic Control Squadron
    - 409 Tactical Fighter Squadron, 18× CF-18
    - 421 Tactical Fighter Squadron, 18× CF-18
    - 439 Tactical Fighter Squadron, 18× CF-18
    - Air Reserve Augmentation Flight (Reserve Pilots)
    - Training Flight, 5× CT-133 Silver Star
    - 1 Air Maintenance Squadron CFB Baden-Soellingen
    - 4 Construction Engineer Squadron, detached from Royal Canadian Engineers
  - Detachment Lahr, 412 Transport Squadron, 2× CC-142 Dash 8
    - 5 Air Movement Unit

== Commanders ==
1 Canadian Air Division (Paris / Metz)

- Air Vice Marshal H.L. Campbell, CBE, CD (11 December 1952 – 3 August 1955)
- Air Vice Marshal H.B. Godwin, CBE, CD (4 August 1955 – 5 August 1958)
- Air Vice Marshal L.E. Wray, OBE, AFC, CD (4 September 1958 – 17 July 1963)
- Air Vice Marshal D.A.R. Bradshaw, DFC, CD (18 July 1963 – 8 August 1966)
- Air Vice Marshal R.J. Lane, DSO, DFC, CD (9 August 1966 – 1 July 1969)
- Lieutenant-General D.C. Laubman, DFC, CD (1 July 1969 – 1 July 1970)

1 Canadian Air Group (Lahr)

- Lieutenant-General D.C. Laubman, DFC, CD (1 July 1970 – August 1970)
- Brigadier General M.F. Doyle, CD (August 1970 – 30 September 1971)
- Brigadier General K.E. Lewis, CMM, OStJ, CD (1 October 1971 – July 1973)
- Brigadier General G.C.E. Theriault, CMM, CD (July 1973 – 25 June 1975)
- Brigadier General J.P.A Cadieux, CD (25 June 1975 - 11 August 1977)
- Brigadier General W.G. Paisley, CMM, CD (11 August 1977 – 31 July 1980)
- Brigadier General P.D. Manson, CMM, CStJ, CD (31 July 1980 – 7 August 1981)
- Brigadier General B.R. Campbell, OMM, CD (7 August 1981 – 7 July 1983)
- Brigadier General D. Huddleston, CMM, MSC, CD (7 July 1983 – 24 July 1986)
- Brigadier General G.S. Clements, CMM, CD (24 July 1986 – 29 May 1988)

1 Canadian Air Division (Lahr)

- Brigadier General G.S. Clements, CMM, CD (29 May 1988 – 15 July 1988)
- Brigadier General A.M. DeQuetteville, CMM, CD (15 July 1988 – 17 July 1989)
- Brigadier General J.E.J. Boyle, CMM, CD (17 July 1989 – 22 July 1991)
- Brigadier General C.R. Thibault, CD (22 July 1991 – 30 July 1993)

1 Canadian Air Division (Winnipeg)

- Major-General George Macdonald, CMM, CD (31 July 1997 – April 1998)
- Major-General Lloyd Campbell, CMM, CD (April 1998 – 19 July 2000)
- Major-General Steve Lucas, CMM, CD (19 July 2000 – 2 August 2002)
- Major-General Marc Dumais, CMM, CD (2 August 2002 – 3 August 2004)
- Major-General Charles Bouchard, OC, CMM, MSC, CD (3 August 2004 – 17 July 2007)
- Major-General Marcel Duval, CMM, CD (17 July 2007 – 9 July 2009)
- Major-General Yvan Blondin, CMM, CD (9 July 2009 – 13 July 2011)
- Major-General Alain Parent, CMM, CD (13 July 2011 – 12 September 2012)
- Major-General Pierre St-Amand, CMM, CD (12 September 2012 – 16 July 2014)
- Major-General David Wheeler, CD (16 July 2014 – 21 June 2016)
- Major-General Christian Drouin, CMM, MSC, CD (21 June 2016 – 16 May 2019)
- Major-General Alain Pelletier, MSM, CD (16 May 2019 – 6 July 2020)
- Major-General Eric Kenny, CMM, MSC, MSM, CD (6 July 2020 – 7 July 2022)
- Major-General Iain Huddleston, OMM, CD (7 July 2022 – 11 July 2024)
- Major-General Chris McKenna, OMM, MSC, MSM, CD (11 July 2024 – present)
