= List of mines in Quebec =

This is a list of mines in the Canadian province of Quebec and includes both operating and closed mines.

Mine	Commodities	Ore deposit	Administrative regions	Owner(s)	Period
Mont Wright	Fe	Bif	Côte-Nord	ArcelorMittal (Luxembourg)	1976-
Lac Jeannine	Fe	Bif	Côte-Nord	Québec Cartier Mining (Canada)	1961-1976
Fire Lake	Fe	Bif	Côte-Nord	ArcelorMittal (Luxembourg)	1976-
Bloom Lake	Fe	Bif	Côte-Nord	Champion Iron (Canada)	2010-2014 2018-
Raglan Mine	Ni, Cu, Co	Komatiitic	Nord-du-Québec	Glencore (Switzerland)	1997-
Nunavik Nickel	Ni, others unknown		Nord-du-Québec	Jilin Jien (China)	2013-
Sigma-Lamaque	Au, Ag		Abitibi-Témiscamingue	Century Mining (United States)	1935-2002 2006-2007
Canadian Malartic	Au	Porphyry	Abitibi-Témiscamingue	Agnico-Eagle (Canada)	2011-
Mouska	Au, Cu, Ag		Abitibi-Témiscamingue	Iamgold (Canada)	1991-2014
LaRonde	Au, Cu, Ag, Zn		Abitibi-Témiscamingue	Agnico-Eagle (Canada)	1988-
Casa Berardi	Au, Ag		Abitibi-Témiscamingue	Mines Aurizon (Canada)	2006-
Kiena	Au, Ag		Abitibi-Témiscamingue	Wesdome Gold Mines (Canada)	2006-2014 2016
Géant Dormant	Au, Ag		Abitibi-Témiscamingue	North American Palladium (Canada)	1988-2011
Francoeur	Au, Ag		Abitibi-Témiscamingue	Mines Richmont (Canada)	1988-2001
Beaufor	Au, Ag		Abitibi-Témiscamingue	Mines Richmont (Canada)	1995-2001 2006-
Lac Herbin	Au, Ag		Abitibi-Témiscamingue	Alexis Mineral (Canada)	2008-2016
Langlois	Au, Cu, Ag, Zn		Abitibi-Témiscamingue	Breakwater Resources (Canada)	1996-2001 2007-2008 2012-2019
Lac Bachelor	Au, Ag		Abitibi-Témiscamingue	Ressources Métanor (Canada)	1982-1989 2015-2019
Persévérance	Au, Cu, Ag, Zn	VHMS	Nord-du-Québec	Xstrata (Switzerland)	2008-2013?
Niobec	Nb	Carbonatites	Saguenay–Lac-Saint-Jean	Magris Resource (Canada)	1976-
Lac Tio	Ti		Côte-Nord	Rio Tinto (United Kingdom)	1976-
Eustis	Cu, S		Estrie	Consolidated Copper and Sulphur Company (1927-1939) (Canada)	1865-1939
Capelton	Cu		Estrie		1863-1907
Jeffrey	Asbestos		Estrie		1879-2012
Lac d'Amiante du Canada	Asbestos	Ophiolite	Estrie		1958-2012
Troïlus	Au, Cu		Nord-du-Québec	Inmet Mining (Canada)	1997-2010
Gaspé Copper	Cu		Gaspésie–Îles-de-la-Madeleine	Noranda mining (Canada)	1968-1999
Aldermac	Au, Ag, Cu		Abitibi-Témiscamingue		1932-1943
Barvue	Zn, |Au		Abitibi-Témiscamingue		1952-1957
Bevcon	Au, Ag		Abitibi-Témiscamingue		1951-1965
East Sullivan	Cu, Zn		Abitibi-Témiscamingue		1949-1967
Manitou	Au, Ag, Cu, Zn		Abitibi-Témiscamingue		1942-1994
Des Georges	Cu, Au, Ag		Nord-du-Québec		1954-1991
Principale	Cu, Au, Ag		Nord-du-Québec		1955-2008
Beattie	Au, Ag		Abitibi-Témiscamingue		1933-1956
Preissac Molybdénite A	Mo, Bi		Abitibi-Témiscamingue		1962-1971
