= COVID-19 pandemic in Nunavut =

Ongoing COVID-19 viral pandemic in Nunavut, Canada

- Disease: COVID-19
- Pathogen: SARS-CoV-2
- Location: Nunavut, Canada
- First outbreak: Wuhan, Hubei, China
- Index case: Sanikiluaq
- Arrival date: November 6, 2020 (5 years, 6 months, 1 week and 5 days)
- Date: April 5, 2022
- Confirmed cases: 3,531
- Active cases: 90
- Recovered: 3,435
- Deaths: 7
- Fatality rate: 0.2%

Government website
- Nunavut Government

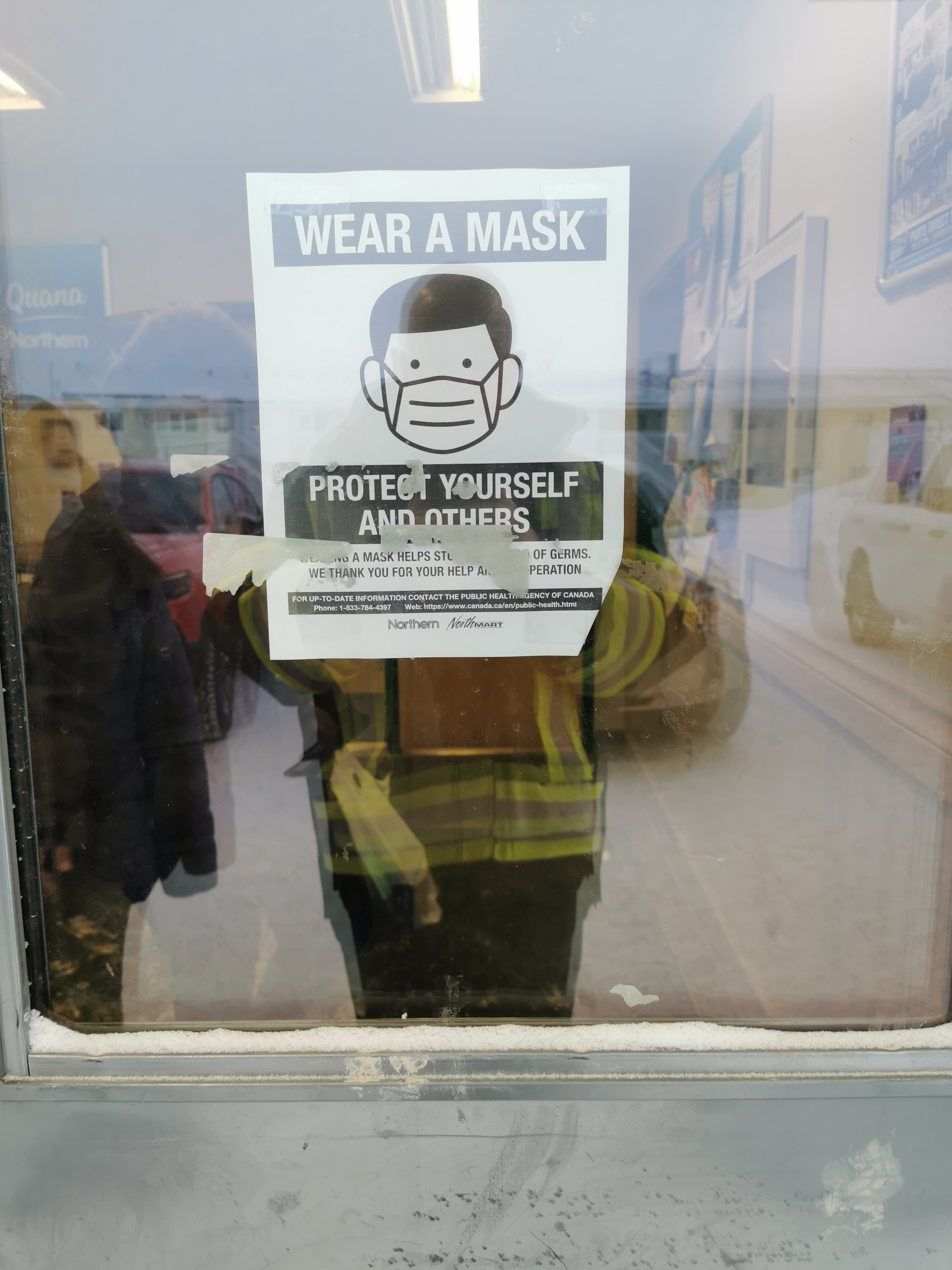
COVID sign at one of the local stores in Cambridge Bay

The COVID-19 pandemic in Nunavut is an ongoing viral pandemic of coronavirus disease 2019 (COVID-19), a novel infectious disease caused by severe acute respiratory syndrome coronavirus 2 (SARS-CoV-2).

Until November 6, 2020, Nunavut remained the only province or territory in Canada, and the only place in North America, that had not yet recorded a confirmed case of COVID-19, with two early presumptive cases later ruled to be false positives, and clusters of cases at mines in September and October involving employees flown in from outside of the territory.

On November 6, 2020, Nunavut recorded its first confirmed case of COVID-19 in-territory. By mid-November, evidence of community transmission began to emerge, prompting the territory to reimplement restrictions in the affected communities. Nunavut's Chief Medical Officer Michael Patterson announced on November 16 that a territory-wide lockdown would take effect on November 18, reinstating the closure of schools and all non-essential businesses for at least two weeks.

In May 2021, the Mary River Mine in the Qikiqtaaluk Region of Baffin Island announced an outbreak, with over 100 employees testing positive for COVID-19. Most of these cases included the Delta variant, a highly transmissible variant of the virus. When the mine shut down operations for May, it sent many workers to their southern home communities, which has led to the variant spreading to several provinces.

As of February 23, 2022, Nunavut has confirmed 2,620 COVID-19 cases, with 2,230 recoveries and five deaths.

== Timeline ==
On January 28, 2020, Nunavut's Chief Medical Officer, Michael Patterson, stated that he had been monitoring the COVID-19 outbreak, and was "liaising with all of our counterparts, including federal and territorial public health experts and communicable disease experts." Patterson stated that Nunavut's Department of Health was making preparations for a possible outbreak within the territory, including educating staff on personal protective equipment and testing procedures.

Patterson felt that the risk of COVID-19 reaching the territory was "very small," as the territory is only accessible by air travel, and that there was not much travel between Nunavut and Wuhan, China "[even] at the best of times". However, he noted that the territory's housing shortages could impact many residents if community transmission were to occur. MLA John Main showed particular concern towards elders, residents of overcrowded homes, government staff, and residents receiving income support, and suggested that the concept of "social distancing" was relatively unknown to the culture of Nunavut, since "we're always inviting people and we're always getting invited to go eat. It is not our culture at all to not visit."

Inuit Tapiriit Kanatami warned that the Inuit population could be disproportionately impacted by COVID-19 due to "long standing social and economic inequities."

=== March 2020 ===
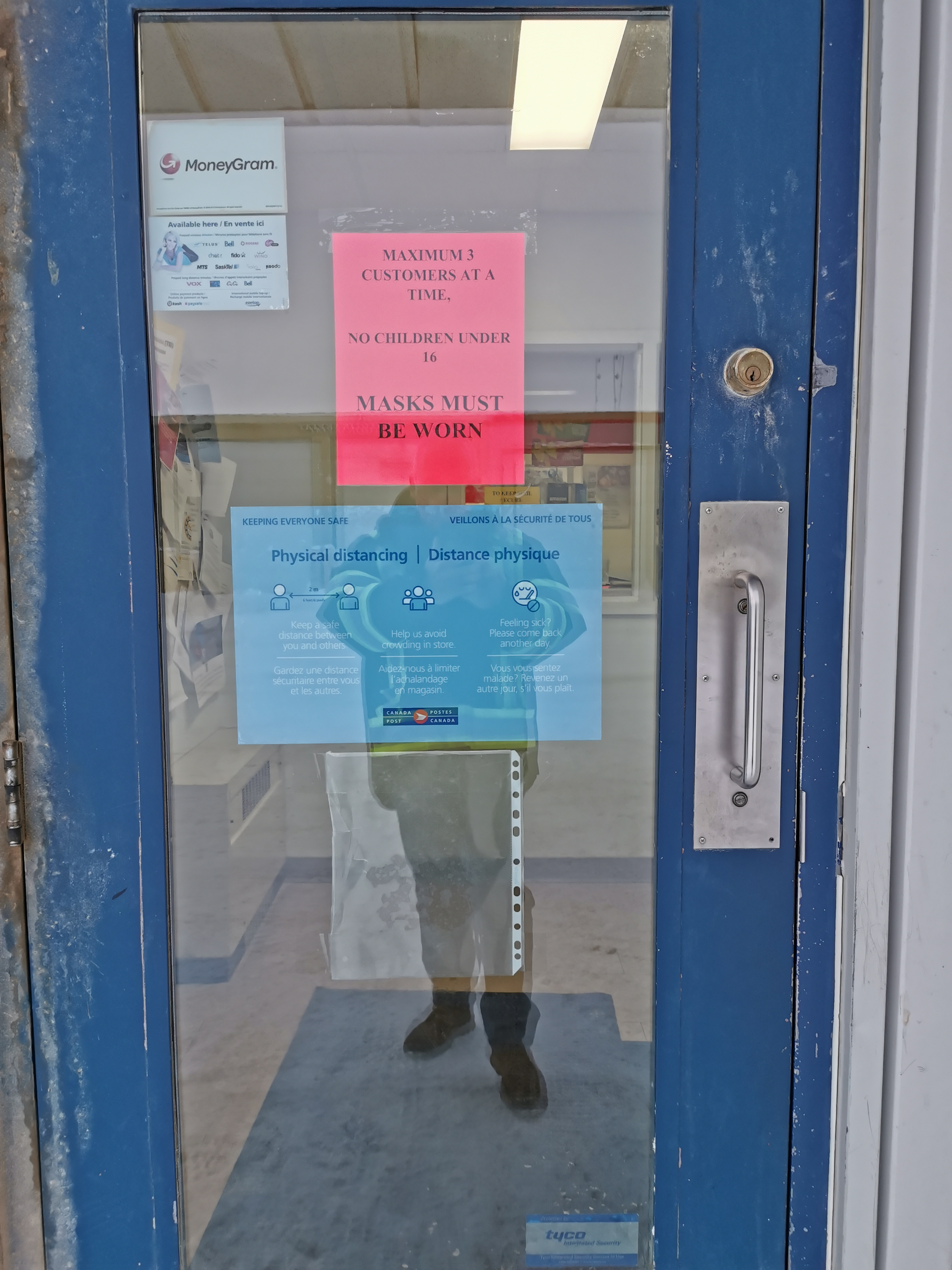
COVID sign at the post office in Cambridge Bay

By mid-March, the government of Nunavut had begun to reduce non-essential travel by its employees. The capital of Iqaluit instituted similar measures, while the hamlets of Cambridge Bay, Coral Harbour, and Igloolik issued recommendations against outside visitors.

On March 17, all schools and daycares in Nunavut, as well as Nunavut Arctic College, were closed for at least three weeks. Some educational institutions transitioned to online courses. Nunavut declared a public health emergency the next day; this included orders for anyone entering the territory to immediately self-isolate for 14 days upon arrival, and recommendations against non-essential travel to the territory. Restaurants and bars were restricted to takeout service only.

Patterson stated that testing of suspected cases was being conducted by health care professionals at patients' homes. The tests were shipped to a laboratory in Winnipeg for processing. Premier Joe Savikataaq stated that at least half of the 50 to 60 tests conducted at that point had been processed, and had all come back negative.

On March 19, residents of Rankin Inlet set up a blockade on the road leading to Agnico Eagle's Meliadine gold mine, protesting the possibility that workers who fly in via the hamlet's airport could spread COVID-19 among residents. In response, the company announced that the Nunavut-based workforces of its Meliadine and Meadowbank mines would be sent home for four weeks with pay. The company stated: "we value our relationship with the people of Nunavut and are committed to do what is best for the health, safety and well-being of all our employees and the communities." During the day's briefing, Minister of Economic Development and Transportation David Akeeagok stated that the company had already taken steps to alleviate potential spread, including screening employees for symptoms before they were allowed to take a flight, and having them depart immediately by bus on arrival (rather than go through the airport) to prevent community contact.

On March 23, it was announced that travel into Nunavut would be significantly restricted beginning March 25, with only residents of the territory and essential medical workers allowed to enter the region. All travellers would be required to quarantine for 14 days at a hotel in one of four "hub" cities before they would be allowed to fly into Nunavut. Premier Savikataaq stressed that "social distancing and staying home as much as possible is not a recommendation. It is necessary to keep our Nunavut healthy. Do it for you. Do it for our elders. Do it for the children."

=== April 2020 ===
In early April, 23 inmates were released from local corrections facilities as a precautionary measure in order to prevent crowding. On April 3, the government and Nunavut Tunngavik Incorporated announced a combined $2 million investment in food security, to be allocated to individual hamlets. On April 14, Prime Minister Justin Trudeau announced that the federal government would provide $30.9 million in financial aid to Nunavut (as part of a $129.9 million package for Canada's territories) to support health care, businesses, and Northern airlines transporting essential goods.

On April 21, following calls by the Nunavut Teachers' Association, it was announced that the remainder of the school year would be cancelled. All out-of-territory teachers were asked to return to Nunavut by April 21.

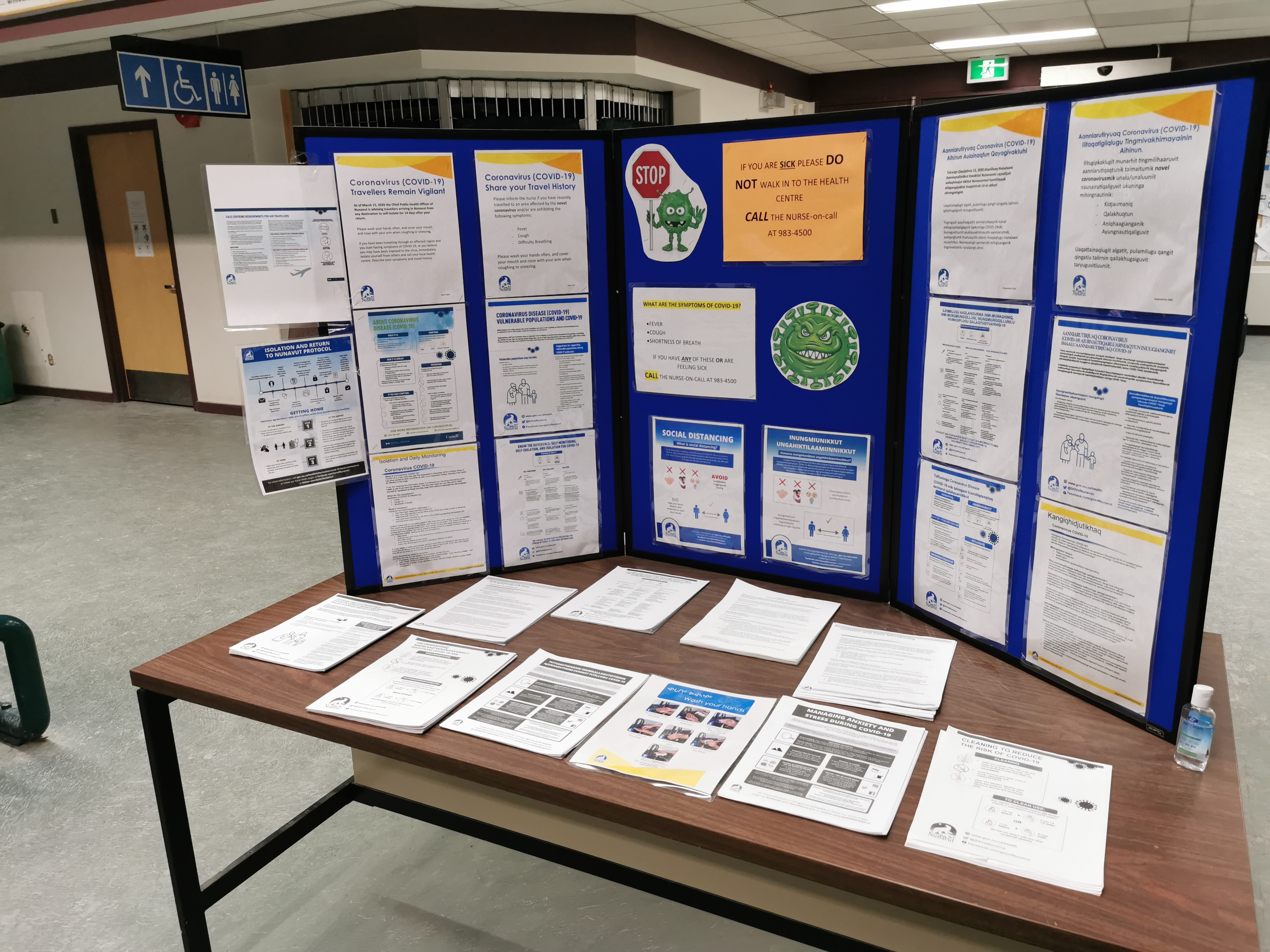
COVID signs at Cambridge Bay Airport in Inuinnaqtun and English

On April 27, Nunavut issued revisions to its social distancing rules, barring all gatherings of more than five people (regardless of location, excluding immediate family in a household), and clarifying restrictions on commerce, with businesses only allowed to remain open if customers are able to practice appropriate social distancing. On April 29, Patterson announced that the territory would only consider lifting restrictions once there was sufficient testing capacity within Nunavut, there were "significant" decreases in new cases in neighbouring provinces often visited by residents, and there were no active cases in the territory. The state of emergency was also extended to May 14.

On April 30, Nunavut announced its first confirmed case, a resident of Pond Inlet. A rapid response team was dispatched to the community. Following the announcement, most Kivalliq Region hamlets began imposing local curfews and other measures. On May 4, however, Patterson reported that the case was a false positive, and that a second test of the same patient had come back negative.

=== May 2020 ===
On May 5, when asked about the possibility of staffing shortages when classes resumed, Premier Savikataaq remarked that "September is still quite a few months away, and there was an announcement earlier in the year that Ontario was going to lay off a whole bunch of teachers, so maybe these teachers would want to come work in Nunavut". The Nunavut Teachers' Association criticized the comments, stating that "teachers are in high demand across the country, and the idea that more will simply move in as others move out is false," and that shortages were also the result of a "chronic lack of support in schools for students and educators," and not just the pandemic. Premier Savikataaq apologized for the comments, explaining that his choice of words was "careless and dismissive." Acknowledging the increased stress teachers face in the region, he stated that "we do value our teachers and we have a recruitment and retention problem in Nunavut."

On May 8, Patterson stated that a GeneXPert machine was being used to process swabs in Iqaluit, but the swabs were still being sent south for secondary tests. As of May 11, 553 residents had tested negative.

On May 14, the state of emergency was extended through May 28. Premier Savikataaq stated that the health department was preparing plans to begin lifting some restrictions.

On May 18, Patterson stated that a resident of Nunavut had tested positive for COVID-19 while outside of the territory for unrelated medical treatments. He stated that the patient "is receiving care in the South and is doing well" and posed minimal risk due to mandatory self-isolation before returning to Nunavut, and that no other information would be released for patient confidentiality reasons. There had still been no cases inside of Nunavut.

On May 28, the state of emergency was extended through June 11.

=== June 2020, lifting of restrictions ===
On May 25, Patterson released "Nunavut's Path," a framework for the gradual lifting of restrictions. Measures to be lifted were classified by their risk, and the impact of the reopening process was to be reevaluated every two weeks by the territorial health department, which would determine whether further restrictions (including those designated as medium- and high-risk) could be lifted, or if they needed to be reintroduced. Existing restrictions on travel into the territory would remain in place indefinitely, likely until a vaccine or proven therapy was discovered.

On June 1, parks and daycares were allowed to reopen, and outdoor gatherings of up to 25 people were permitted. That day, Patterson also announced that an advisory against domestic travel within the territory had been lifted, and that on June 8, government employees would be allowed to return to their offices (subject to social distancing and health protocols, after having been re-classified as a low-risk opening), and that libraries, museums, and galleries would be allowed to reopen to individual browsing only.

On June 11, the state of emergency was extended through June 25, and it was announced that recreation centres would be allowed to re-open on June 15 (although Iqaluit held off on immediately reopening its aquatic centre, due to needs to adapt the facility for compliance with social distancing guidelines, and to perform repairs on equipment that had failed during the closure).

On June 22, bars, restaurants, and personal care facilities were allowed to re-open, subject to social distancing, and with a last call of 9 p.m. for bars. Personal care facilities were required to offer protective equipment to customers and employees who requested them. Cabs could pick up people from multiple households at once, provided they wore masks.

=== July 2020 ===
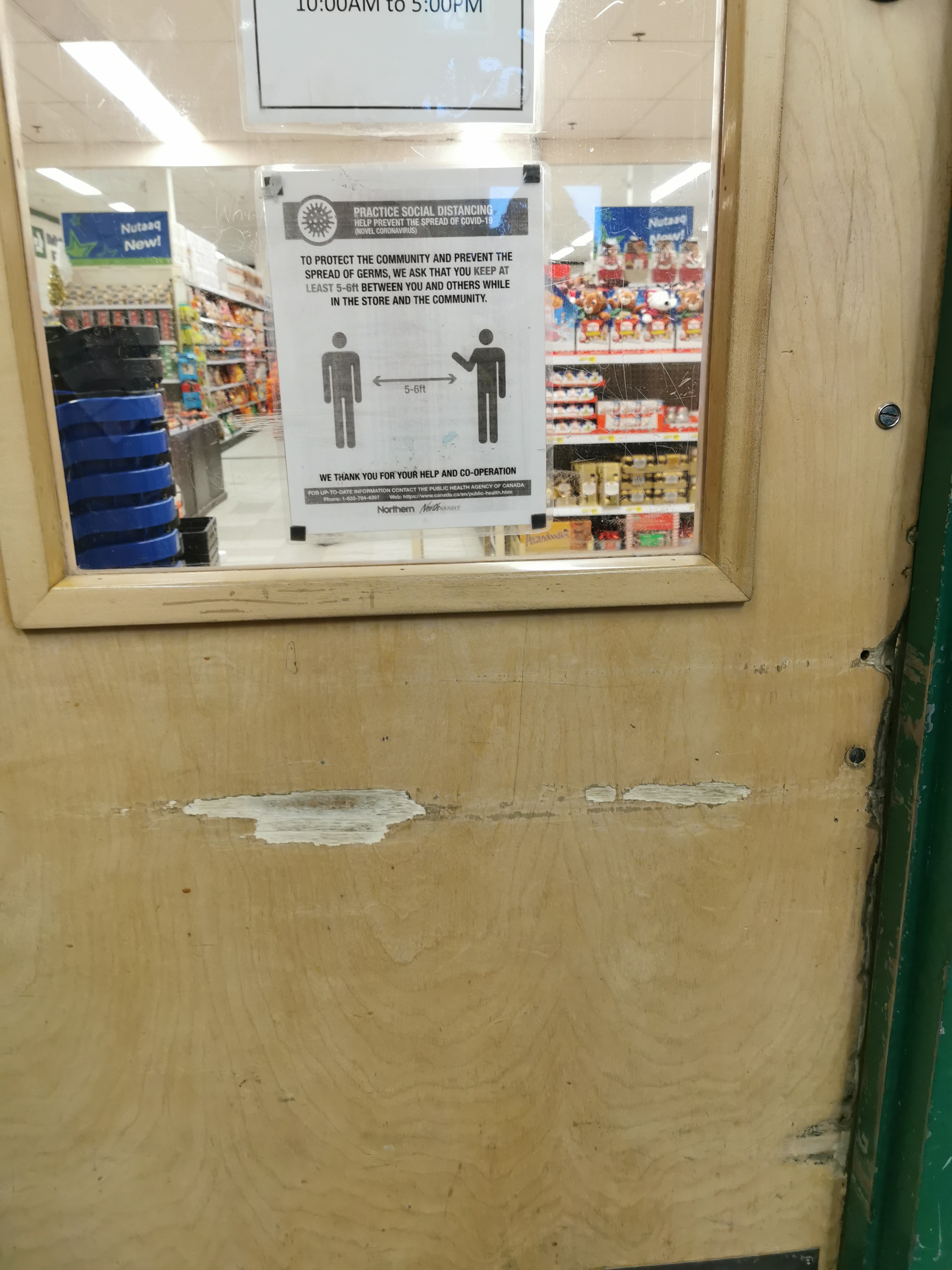
COVID sign promoting social distancing at one of the local stores in Cambridge Bay

On July 2, Nunavut announced it was monitoring a presumptive case from an employee of the Mary River Mine. The Department of Health stated that the employee was "doing well" and had "no contact between Mary River workers and any of the surrounding communities," and that the employee and all contacts were in quarantine. The mine had been operated solely by outside workers since March. On July 10, it was reported that the patient had tested negative on follow-up tests. On July 13, it was announced that restaurants would be allowed to resume operating at normal business hours beginning July 20.

On July 20, the federal government announced that up to $18.9 million in funding would be provided to cover PPE, testing, and paid sick leave.

=== September to October 2020 ===
Schools resumed in-person classes for the new semester, with cohorting, mandatory masks in certain situations for students over the age of 13, and social distancing. A four-level system would be used to escalate mitigations if Nunavut experienced a heightened rate of infections (including staggered or alternate-day schedules, or suspension of in-person classes).

On September 16, two positive cases were reported in the Hope Bay mine near Cambridge Bay. One positive case was also confirmed at the Mary River Mine on September 21. These cases were not counted towards Nunavut's case count, since the transmissions were believed to have occurred before the infected people entered the territory. On September 28, the presumptive positive cases at Hope Bay mine increased to seven.

On October 1, one employee from the Meliadine mine tested positive for the virus. On October 5, Nunavut confirmed seven of the Hope Bay cases, although whether they would count as the territory's first official cases was still being determined. The same day, it was announced that restaurants and bars could increase to 75% capacity with social distancing, bars could return to normal hours; outdoor gatherings could increase to 100 and indoor to 15; arenas and recreation facilities were capped at 50 people; and galleries, libraries, and museums could operate at half capacity.

Nunavut declared the Hope Bay outbreak contained on October 8, with 10 confirmed cases and six still presumptive; the territory did not count the cases as part of its local total, as they fell under the case counts of the individual employees' provinces or territories of origin.

On October 21, another presumptive case at the Mary River Mine was confirmed to be positive.

=== November 2020–present ===
On November 6, Nunavut confirmed its first case, in Sanikiluaq. All non-essential businesses and schools were ordered to close, grocery stores were ordered to limit capacity and reduce hours, indoor gatherings were prohibited, outdoor gatherings were limited to five, and non-essential travel into and out of the area was restricted. Two days later, a second confirmed case was reported in Sanikiluaq. On November 9, Patterson stated that a person had tested positive at an isolation hub in Winnipeg. It was thought that the person contracted COVID-19 before entering the isolation hub.

On November 11, a third case was confirmed by Patterson in Rankin Inlet. As a result, restrictions were implemented in the Kivalliq region, and local schools and colleges announced they would close for at least 14 days. On November 13, a case was reported in Arviat, and on November 14 another four cases were found in Arviat, doubling the total to eight. On November 15, nine new cases were reported in Arviat, and a second in Rankin Inlet

On November 16, after announcing eight new cases (bringing the territory's total to 26), Patterson announced that a two-week restriction period would be implemented territory-wide from November 18 in order to control community transmission in Nunavut. All gatherings were limited to five people unless otherwise noted, while non-essential businesses, bars, dine-in restaurants, personal care facilities, and schools were ordered closed. All businesses and organizations were required to switch to remote work if possible. Medical centres would serve emergency patients only. Masks remained strongly recommended territory wide, but as before, were mandated only in Kivalliq and Sanikiluaq.

Premier Savikataaq referred to the restrictions as being like "[a] circuit breaker, a chance to reset. No one is above the rules here. Let's make this clear, so there's no misunderstanding. Do not visit, do not socialize outside your household." In an interview with CTV News Channel's Power Play, Premier Savikataaq stated that all of the cases so far had a connection to Winnipeg, that community transmission in Nunavut was of concern due to overcrowding within its communities, but that "our saving grace is we've had time to prepare."

On November 17, a further 34 new cases were announced, more than doubling the total number of active cases, from 26 to 60. There were 26 new cases reported in Arviat, and eight in Whale Cove. The government stated that seven of the people in Whale Cove were infected by a person travelling from Arviat. On November 18, another 10 cases were reported (totaling 70), with eight in Arviat and two new cases in Rankin Inlet.

On November 19, four new cases were announced in Nunavut: three in Arviat and one in Rankin Inlet. These were followed by another ten new cases on November 20: six in Rankin Inlet, one in Arviat and three in Whale Cove. This brought the total cases to 84.

On December 20, the territory's first two deaths linked to COVID-19 were reported; one resident of Arviat and one resident of Rankin Inlet died in a Winnipeg hospital.

The first vaccine, of Moderna type, arrived in Iqaluit on December 30 and was administered on January 6, 2021.

In May 2021, the Mary River Mine announced an outbreak, and shut down operations, sending many employees home. 106 employees tested positive, 96 of whom were positive with the Delta variant, a highly transmissible variant of the virus. The workers who returned home are believed to have spread the virus from the mine, including the Delta variant, and have been linked to several hundred cases in Ontario, Alberta, and elsewhere. However, since the mine employees have not been in contact with local communities since the start of the pandemic, there has been no spread in Nunavut linked to the mine. The mine has had no positive cases since June 5.

The territory reported one new case on December 6, 2021; the first since October 19, 2021. The territory's active case count is now one.

One new case was reported in Nunavut on December 8, 2021. There are now two active cases.

On December 23, 2021, health officials confirmed one new case, bringing the active case count to three.

On January 18, 2022, officials reported 140 new COVID-19 cases since its last update on January 14, 2022, bringing the active cases to 268.

== Response ==
=== Travel restrictions ===
On March 13, Patterson issued an advisory requesting residents reduce domestic travel and avoid international travel. Transport Canada announced the same day that cruise ship traffic to Nunavut would be suspended for the remainder of the season.

Starting March 25, air entry into Nunavut by non-residents was prohibited, with exemptions granted for critical medical workers. Residents returning to the territory are required to quarantine for 14 days at a hotel in either Edmonton, Ottawa, Winnipeg, or Yellowknife before flying back. They are monitored by security guards enforcing the quarantine, and are provided with meals. These services are paid for by the government; on May 6, Premier Savikataaq backpedalled on a proposal to require these hotel stays be covered by the traveller (at a cost of $2,100 per person), as "travel at this time is a risk and we don't want to undo all the hard work we have done." Exceptions were later made for those receiving medical treatment in Yellowknife. The travel advisory against in-territory travel ended June 1, but other restrictions remained.

On June 4, Patterson said he was in discussions with officials from the Northwest Territories over the possibility of removing restrictions on travel between Nunavut and the Northwest Territories. He noted that such an arrangement would have to be designed so that it would not be usable as a loophole to bypass Nunavut's quarantine requirements.

The Canadian Civil Liberties Association issued a letter to Minister of Justice Jeannie Ehaloak questioning whether the territory's travel restrictions were in compliance with Section 6 of the Canadian Charter of Rights and Freedoms. On June 11, after the Northwest Territories partly loosened its travel restrictions (which previously contained a similar quarantine hub requirement and restriction to residents, in favour of allowing unrestricted travel — subject to self-isolation on arrival) as a result of similar concerns, Patterson stated that based on the opinion of lawyers, the decision to suspend freedom of movement was allowable under the Charter due to the emergency declaration. He argued that the measure was needed due to the stronger impact that an outbreak could have in Nunavut than in other parts of the country. In regards to the decision's impact on the proposed "travel bubble," Patterson stated that they were "still interested in it but we want to understand how this will impact potential risks before we make a firm decision one way or another."

On June 15, it was announced that travellers from the Northwest Territories would be allowed to enter Nunavut, provided they had been in the region for at least 14 days before entering and had received approval from Nunavut health officials. On June 22, medical travel to Churchill, Manitoba was exempted from Nunavut's quarantine requirements, citing a low risk because there had been no cases in the town. On July 13, it was announced that restrictions on travel to Churchill would be lifted, but subject to approval by health officials. On November 16, the Northwest Territories suspended its open borders with Nunavut due to the latter territory's first ongoing outbreak.

=== By hamlets ===
On April 30, Chesterfield Inlet passed a motion prohibiting any outside visitors from entering the hamlet. It also required returning residents to self-isolate for 14 days.

In May 2020, to reinforce social distancing laws by discouraging gatherings, a number of hamlets began to institute temporary restrictions on any consumption, possession, or distribution of alcohol.

== Impact ==
The pandemic is projected to have a major impact on the territory's $300 million tourism industry. The cruise line industry could potentially be severely affected. Previous years saw 55 ships with over 10,000 visitors.
