= The Northern Miner =

The Northern Miner may refer to the following newspapers:

- The Northern Miner (Canada)
- The Northern Miner (Queensland)
