= Spertiniite =

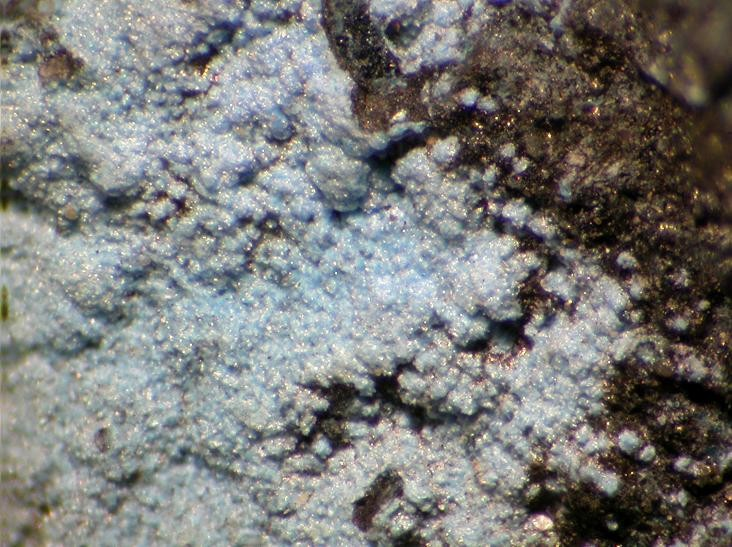
- Spertiniite from Dzhezkazgan, Kazakhstan (size: 5 mm)

General
- Category: Oxide mineral
- Formula: Cu(OH)_{2}
- IMA symbol: Sni
- Strunz classification: 4.FD.05
- Dana classification: 6.2.4.1
- Crystal system: Orthorhombic
- Crystal class: Pyramidal (mm2); H-M symbol: (mm2)
- Space group: Cmc2_{1}
- Unit cell: a = 2.95 Å, b = 10.59 Å c = 5.27 Å; Z = 4

Identification
- Formula mass: 97.56 g/mol
- Color: Blue, blue-green
- Crystal habit: Flat tabular crystals occurring in radial to botryoidal aggregates
- Cleavage: None
- Tenacity: Brittle
- Mohs scale hardness: Soft
- Luster: Vitreous
- Diaphaneity: Transparent
- Specific gravity: 3.93
- Optical properties: Biaxial
- Refractive index: n_{α} = 1.720, n_{β}= n.d., n_{γ} = > 1.800
- Pleochroism: Strong; X = colorless; Z = dark blue
- Other characteristics: Decomposes in hot water (synthetic)

Spertiniite is a rare copper hydroxide mineral. Chemically, it is copper(II) hydroxide with the formula Cu(OH)_{2}. It occurs as blue to blue-green tabular orthorhombic crystal aggregates in a secondary alkaline environment altering chalcocite. Associated minerals include chalcocite, atacamite, native copper, diopside, grossular, and vesuvianite.

== Discovery and occurrence ==
It was first described in 1981 for an occurrence in the Jeffrey Mine of the Johns-Manville mine, Val-des-Sources, Quebec. It was named for mine geologist Francesco Spertini (born 1937). In addition to the type locality, it has also been reported from Mont Saint-Hilaire, Quebec; Ely, White Pine County, Nevada; and Bisbee, Cochise County, Arizona. It has been reported from Dzhezkazgan, Kazakhstan; from slag at Juliushutte, Astfeld, Harz Mountains, Germany; and from Tsumeb, Namibia.

A 2006 study has produced evidence the blue mineral chrysocolla may be a microscopic mixture of spertiniite, amorphous silica and water.

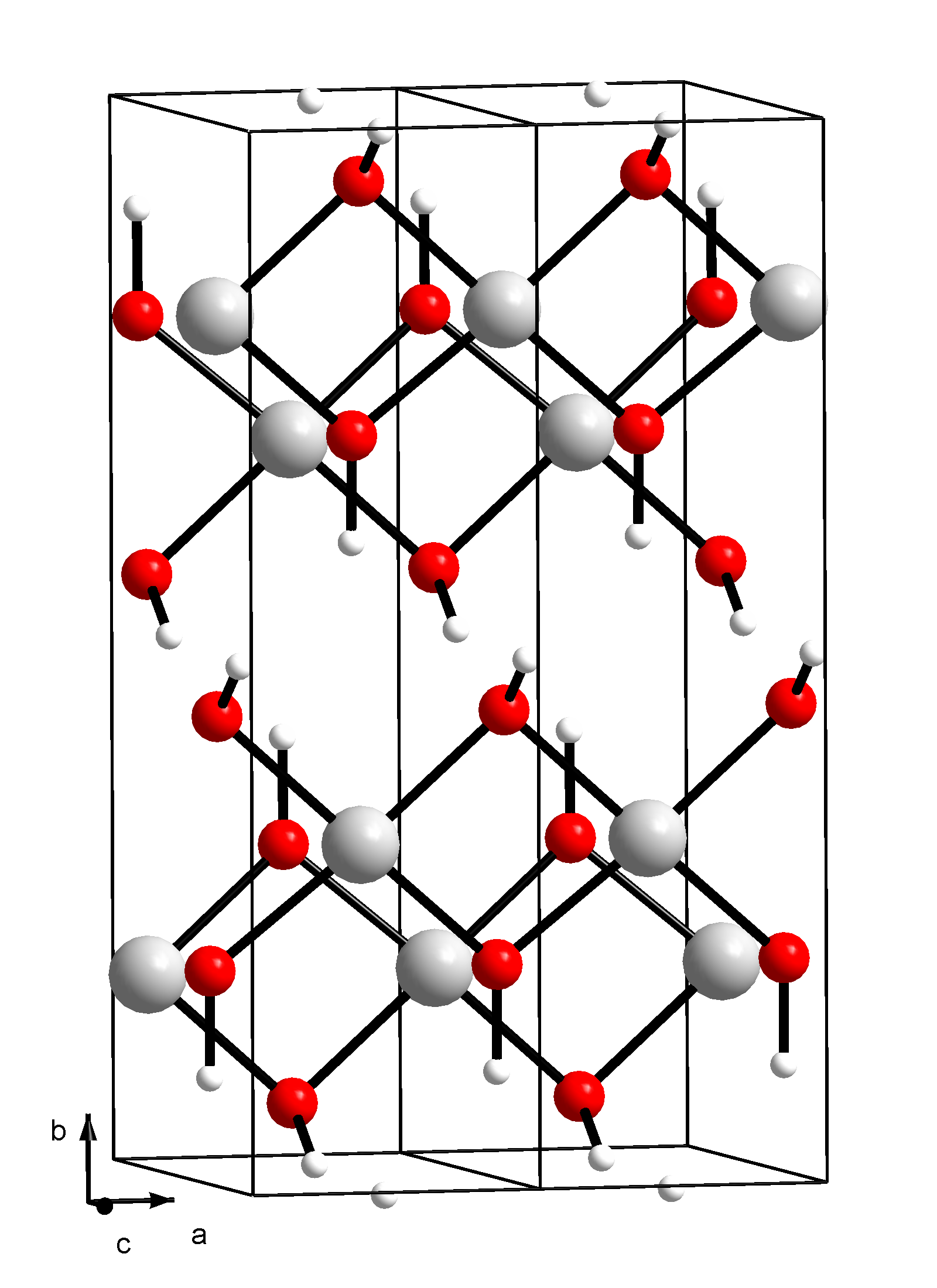
Crystal structure of spertiniite
