= Bayan Khundii Gold Mine =

Gold mine in Bayankhongor, Mongolia

Location
- Location: Bayankhongor, Mongolia

Production
- Products: gold

History
- Opened: 14 September 2025

The Bayan Khundii Gold Mine is an open-pit gold mining site in Bayankhongor Province, Mongolia.

== History ==
The ore was firstly discovered in 2015. The mine is being developed by Erdene Resource Development. They secured the mining license to explore the mine from the Mineral Resource and Petroleum Authority of Mongolia in August 2019. The bankable feasibility study was completed in July 2020 and an updated feasibility study was completed in July 2023. On 14 September 2025, the company announced its first gold pour at the mine.

== Geology ==
It consists of Khundii Exploration License and Khundii Mining License with an area of 2,205 hectares and 2,308 hectares respectively.

== Mining ==
The mine is expected to have an operational period of eight years. It will be developed as an open-pit mining with 10.9 stripping ratio.

== See also ==
- Mining in Mongolia
