= Kittilä mine =

Gold mine in Finland

Kittilä
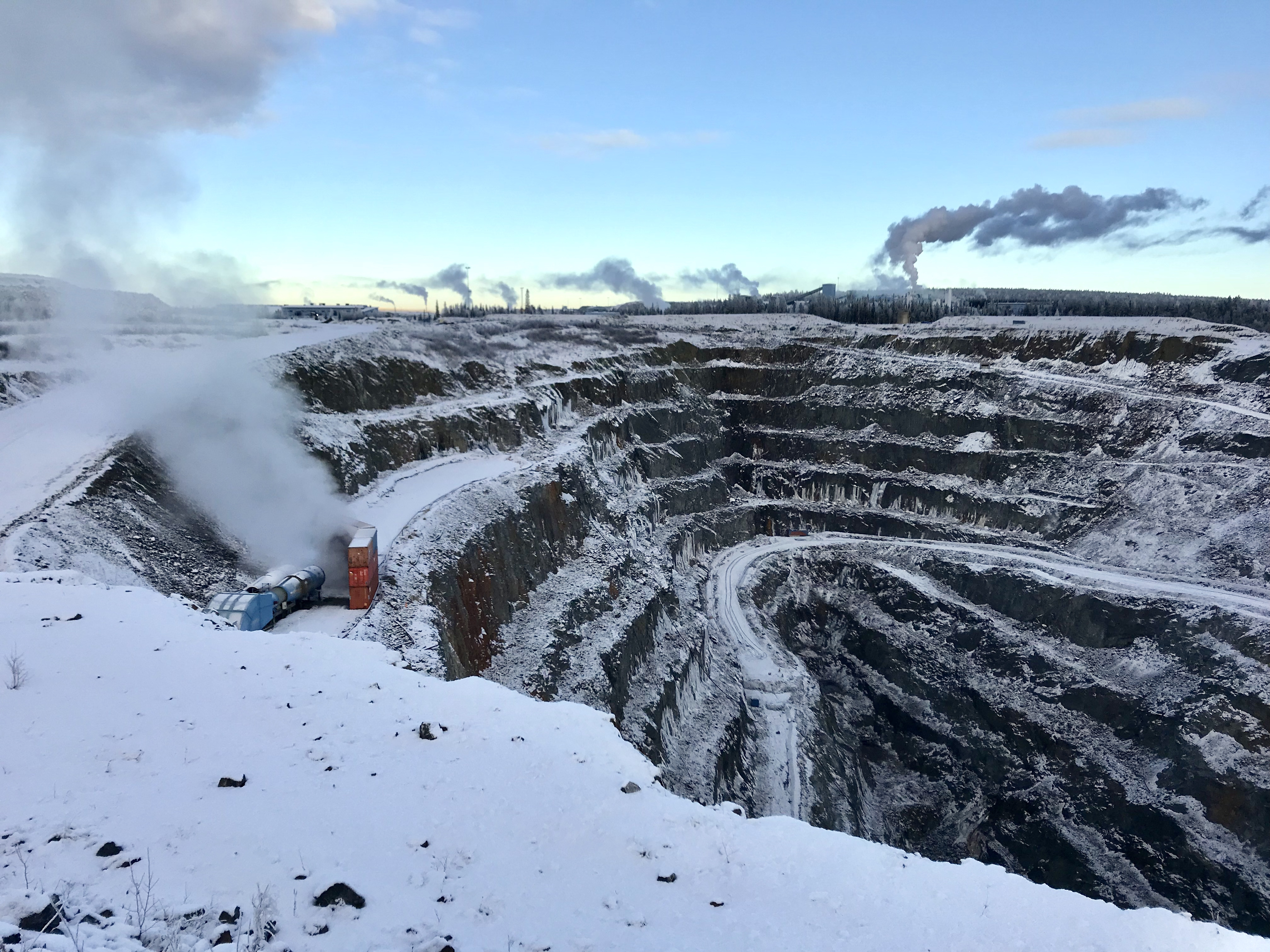
- The open pit at Kittilä

- Location in Finland
- Location: Kittilä, Lapland, Finland; 67°54′50″N 025°24′00″E
- Production: 150,000 (est)
- Financial year: 2009
- Opened: 2008
- Company: Agnico-Eagle Mines Limited
- Acquired: 2005

Kittilä mine is a gold mine in Kittilä, in the Lapland region of Finland. The mine is owned and operated by Agnico-Eagle Mines Limited and is located 36 kilometres (22 mi) north-east of Kittilä. It is the largest gold mine in Europe.

Exploration began in 1986, and production started in 2008. The mine is composed of two open pits, with the proceeds of the operation funding an underground mining operation, accessed by a ramp from surface and utilizing both transverse and longitudinal long-hole stoping methods. The mine utilizes on-site concentrating to produce Doré bars for shipment off-site for refinement, and produced 150,000 ounces (4,300,000 g) of gold in 2009.

== History ==
In 1986 gold was discovered near the town of Kittilä. The Geological Survey of Finland initiated exploration which resulted in a discovery of gold mineralization. Diamond drilling continued up to 1991, when exploration ended. In 1998 the property was sold to Svenska Platina AB, a junior mining company which was a subsidiary of Riddarhyttan Resources AB. Permitting for an open pit mine began in 2002, with a mining licence and permit secured in 2003. Agnico Eagle purchased a stake in Riddarhyttan (at the time feasibility studies suggested the resource was between 2–3.7 million ounces of gold) in 2004, with the remainder of the company being purchased in 2005. Diamond drilling continued in 2005, with an additional 460 holes drilled over 136,000 metres (446,000 ft). In September 2008 an additional 60 kilometres (200,000 ft) of drilling resulted in a gold reserve increase of two million ounces (5.7 million ounces total), over 18.2 million tonnes of ore, grading 5.12 grams per tonne. Excavation of the open pit began in September 2007 and ore production began in May 2008. Mining in the Suuri pit began at 2,500 tonnes (2,800 short tons) per day to be increased to 3,000 tonnes (3,300 short tons) by the end of 2009.

In 2020, the Kittilä mine produced record amounts of 6,473 kilograms (228,300 oz) of gold and 1.84 million metric tons of ore.

== Mining operation ==
=== Open pit ===
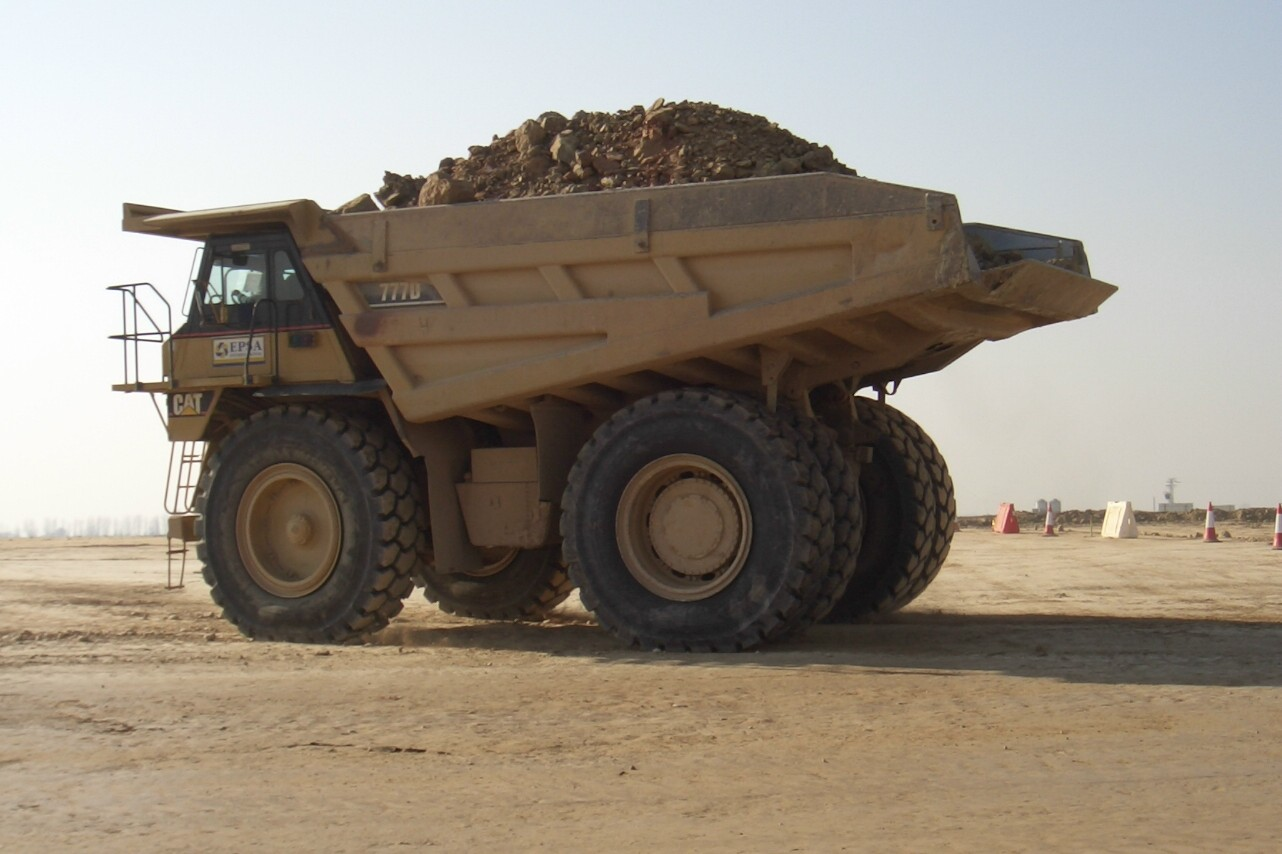
Caterpillar 777

The ore zone at the Kittilä mine (mined by what are known as the Suuri and Roura pits) is approximately 4.5 km (2.8 mi) long, 3.3 km (2.1 mi) wide, 1.1 km (0.68 mi) deep. Drilling is done using both Sandvik and Atlas Copco drill rigs, with ore being loaded into Caterpillar 777 dump trucks (pictured) by Caterpillar 385 hydraulic excavators. Mining in the pits is expected to last for up to five years. Proceeds from the pits are being used to finance the underground mining operation. The pit produces 65,000 tonnes (72,000 short tons) of material per month, removing eight tons of waste per ton of ore. Provided they are able to acquire larger trucks, Agnico will increase their monthly tonnage to 100,000 tonnes (110,000 short tons).

=== Underground ===
Underground development began in October 2006. Access tunnels are 8 metres (26 ft) wide, which will permit the use of haul trucks up to 60-tonne capacity. Underground mining will be done using long-hole stoping methods, either along strike (longitudinal) in the case of narrow areas (less than 5 metres (16 ft)), and perpendicular (transverse) to the ore body in the case of wider zones. Levels are designed to be 30 metres (98 ft) apart (from the floor to floor).

== Processing ==
The mill at the Kittila mine begins with a crusher and semi-autogenous grinding mill (SAG Mill), where ore is sized to 5.5 mm (0.22 in). The ore is then sent to flotation cells where the gold (located in sulphide material) is separated from gangue material. The concentrated ore is sent to an autoclave, and heated to 190|C at a pressure of 19-bar (1,900 kPa). This heat and the addition of oxygen separates the gold from the sulphide material. The separated material is then leached out using cyanide. The carbon is removed from the leached material and the gold is smelted into 800-ounce (23 kg) Doré bars, which are sent off-site for further refining. Kittila realizes an average gold recovery of 92%, and has the capacity to produce up to four bars per week.

The Kittila mill also includes a bomb shelter, a legal requirement under a 1917 Finnish law which came into effect following Finnish independence from Russia. The shelter is open for viewing by visitors and contains emergency supplies such as oxygen tanks, food, drink and a set of golf clubs.
