= William Henry Jeffrey =

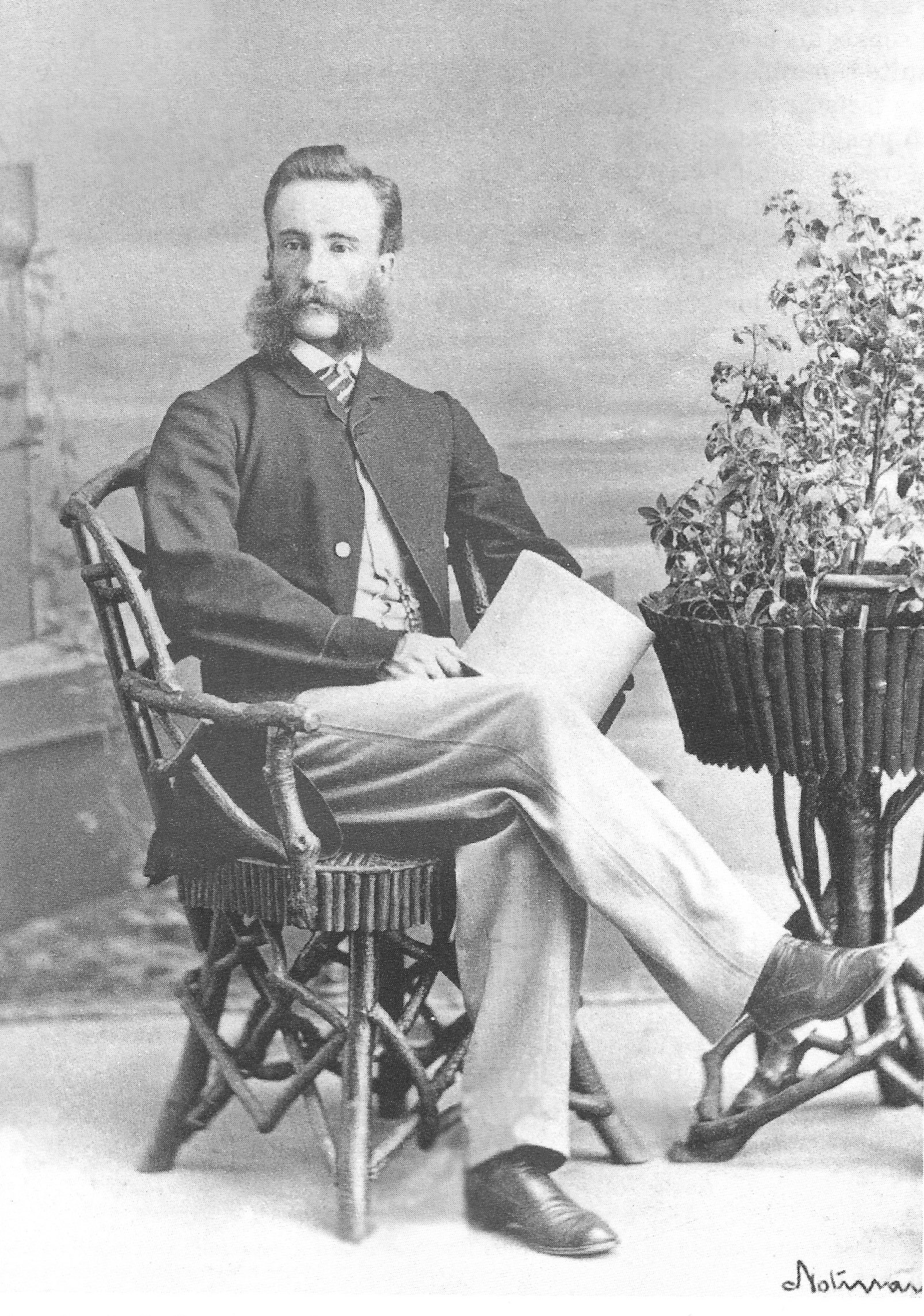
- Born: January 31, 1811; Devonport, Plymouth
- Died: April 14, 1895 (aged 84); Richmond, Quebec
- Burial place: Mount Hermon Cemetery; 46.78004°N 71.24817°W
- Occupation(s): Shipbuilder, merchant, and farmer.
- Known for: being named after the Jeffrey Mine in Val-des-Sources.
- Children: 10

William Henry Denning Jeffrey (31 January 1811 — 14 April 1895) was an English-born Canadian merchant, shipbuilder, militia officer, and pioneering entrepreneur in the asbestos mining industry.

== Early life ==
Born in Devonport, Devon, England, Jeffrey immigrated to Quebec where he established himself as a businessman and community figure.

== Career ==
On 30 November 1853, William Henry Jeffrey was appointed lieutenant (cornet) in the Quebec Cavalry Corps by order of the Adjutant General’s office, as published in the official militia promotions of the Province of Canada.

In July 1877, Jeffrey was among the notable figures in Richmond, who welcomed Prime Minister Sir John A. Macdonald during his visit to the Eastern Townships. A contemporary newspaper account lists him alongside local officials and political leaders present at the Richmond railway station, where Macdonald received an address from the community before continuing on to Sherbrooke.

In April 1878, Jeffrey was among the municipal electors of St. Peter’s Ward, Quebec City, who signed a public address endorsing Pierre Garneau for Alderman and John L. Gibb and J.C. Nolan for Councillors in the upcoming municipal elections.

In 1879, Welsh miner Evan Williams identified asbestos on a hillside in Shipton Township known as “Webb’s Ledge” and recognized its commercial potential. In 1881, Jeffrey, a Quebec City businessman residing in the Richmond area, financed the opening of a mine on the site, which was owned by Charles Webb. Under the terms of the agreement, Webb received royalties of $10 per ton of fibre produced in summer and $5 per ton in winter. Initially mined on an artisanal scale using manual labour and a horse-powered derrick, production grew from one or two tonnes per day to about 2,300 tonnes annually over fourteen years. This early enterprise became the foundation of what would later be developed into the Jeffrey Mine (named after him) in Asbestos, Quebec, one of the world’s largest producers of chrysotile asbestos.

In April 1886, the Sheriff of Saint Francis District announced the seizure and upcoming sale of William Henry Jeffrey’s mining rights in parts of Shipton Township These rights, granted under a 20-year lease signed in 1879, allowed Jeffrey to explore for and extract asbestos and other minerals, erect buildings, and use local water sources, in exchange for paying a 20 percent royalty on net profits to the landowner. The sale included the mining rights, related buildings, and improvements.

By the early 1890s, the asbestos industry was undergoing significant consolidation, driven largely by the formation of American and British monopolies such as H.W. Johns' Manufacturing Company and United Asbestos of London. These entities controlled substantial portions of Quebec asbestos production and influenced market prices, which fell sharply from $128 per ton in 1890 to $64 in 1892. This price collapse, coupled with the need for costly investments in mechanization and improved extraction methods, placed immense financial strain on smaller operators. Jeffrey, heavily indebted from years of artisanal mining, was unable to adapt to these industrial demands. In 1893, creditors demanded repayment, and following a court ruling that required him to pay $2,500 plus interest to landowner Charles Webb, Jeffrey declared bankruptcy. His mining rights and assets were subsequently taken over in 1894 by James Naismith Greenshields, a lawyer and businessman, marking the end of Jeffrey’s direct involvement. The mine was then operated by the Danville Asbestos and Slate Company, later replaced by the Asbestos and Asbestic Company, under which mining methods and production expanded significantly.

== Personal life ==
Jeffrey married Elizabeth Batson Noad on 14 November 1840 at the Anglican Cathedral of the Holy Trinity, he was 29 and she was 16 years old.

Jeffrey and Noad had 10 children. The 1861 census records the family as follows: "Merchant, born England, 50; wife EB turning 37; Children and age turning: son HJ 18; Amelie 10; Ida 9; Florence 7; son? WH 7 -all at school; Louise 5; Constance 3; living away at school in Toronto: Charlotte 16; Annie 15; Francis 12".

== See also ==
- Lower Canada
- Province of Canada
- Quebec Central Railway
- Val-des-Sources
