= Jeffrey Mine =

Asbestos mine in Val-des-Sources, Quebec, Canada

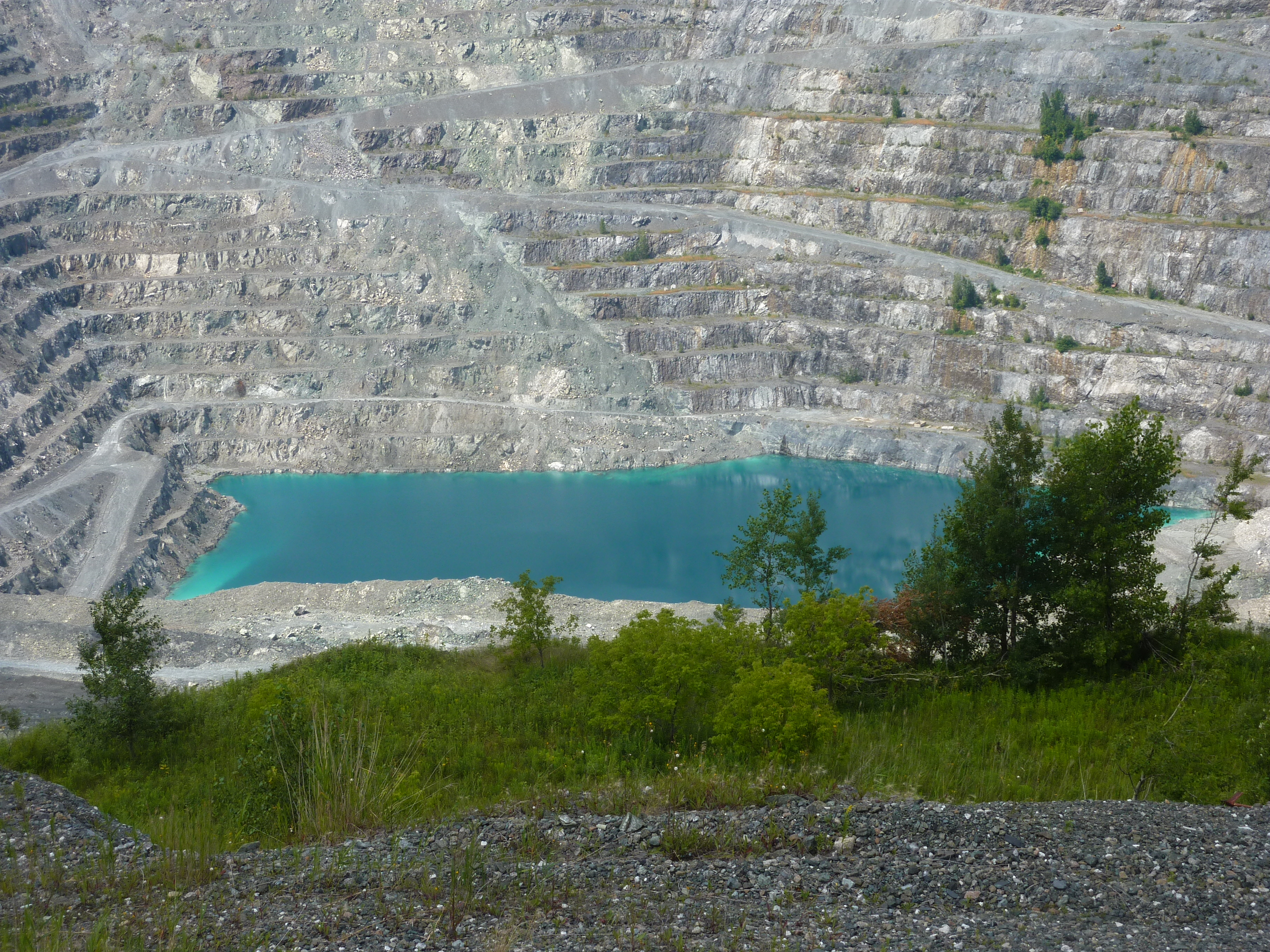
- View of the Jeffrey Mine

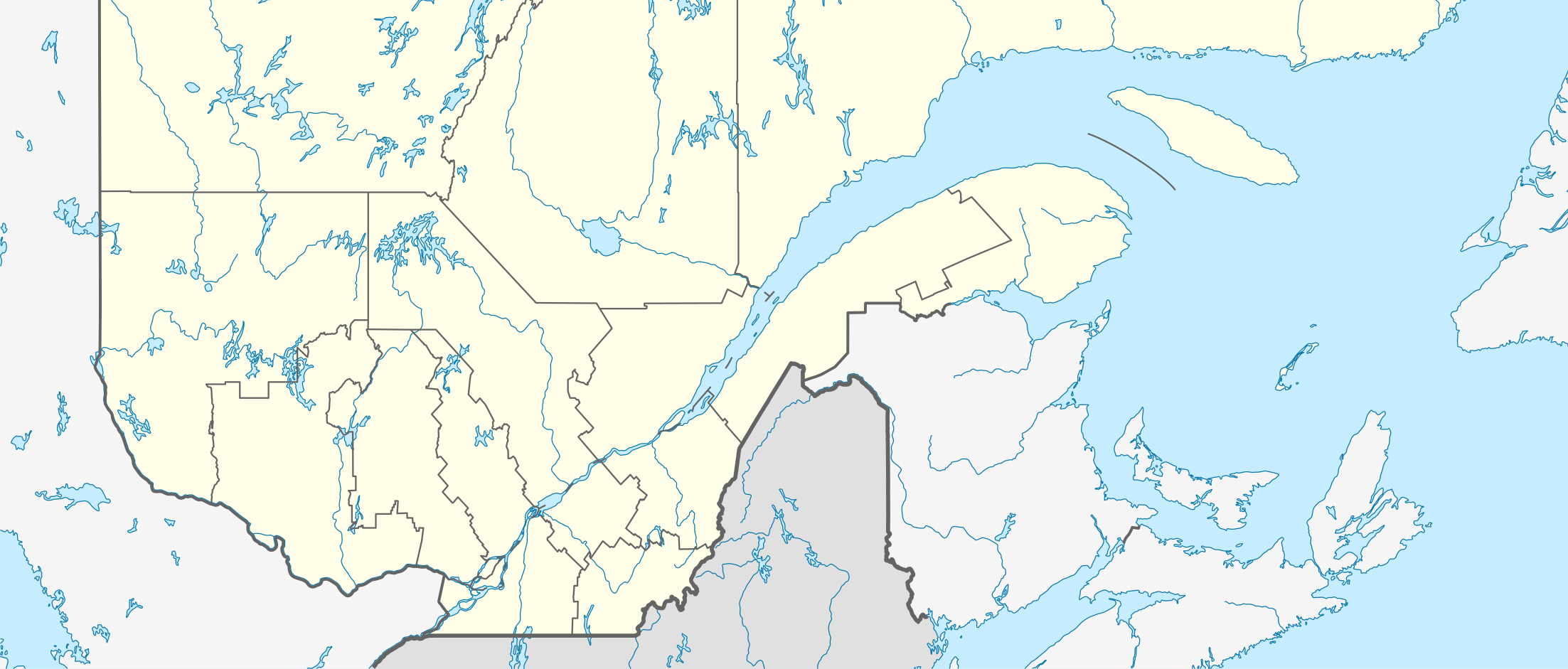
- Location in Quebec
- Location: Val-des-Sources, Canada; 45.7655°N 71.9460°W
- Products: Chrysotile
- Type: Open pit
- Opened: 1879
- Closed: 2012
- Company: Val-des-Sources

The Jeffrey Mine, was a large chrysotile asbestos mine located in the town of Val-des-Sources, which was formerly known as Asbestos, in southeastern Quebec, Canada. For much of the 20th century, it was the world’s largest asbestos mine and the dominant employer in the region. It also became internationally renowned among mineralogists and collectors for producing exceptional mineral specimens, including grossulars and vesuvianite crystals.

== History ==
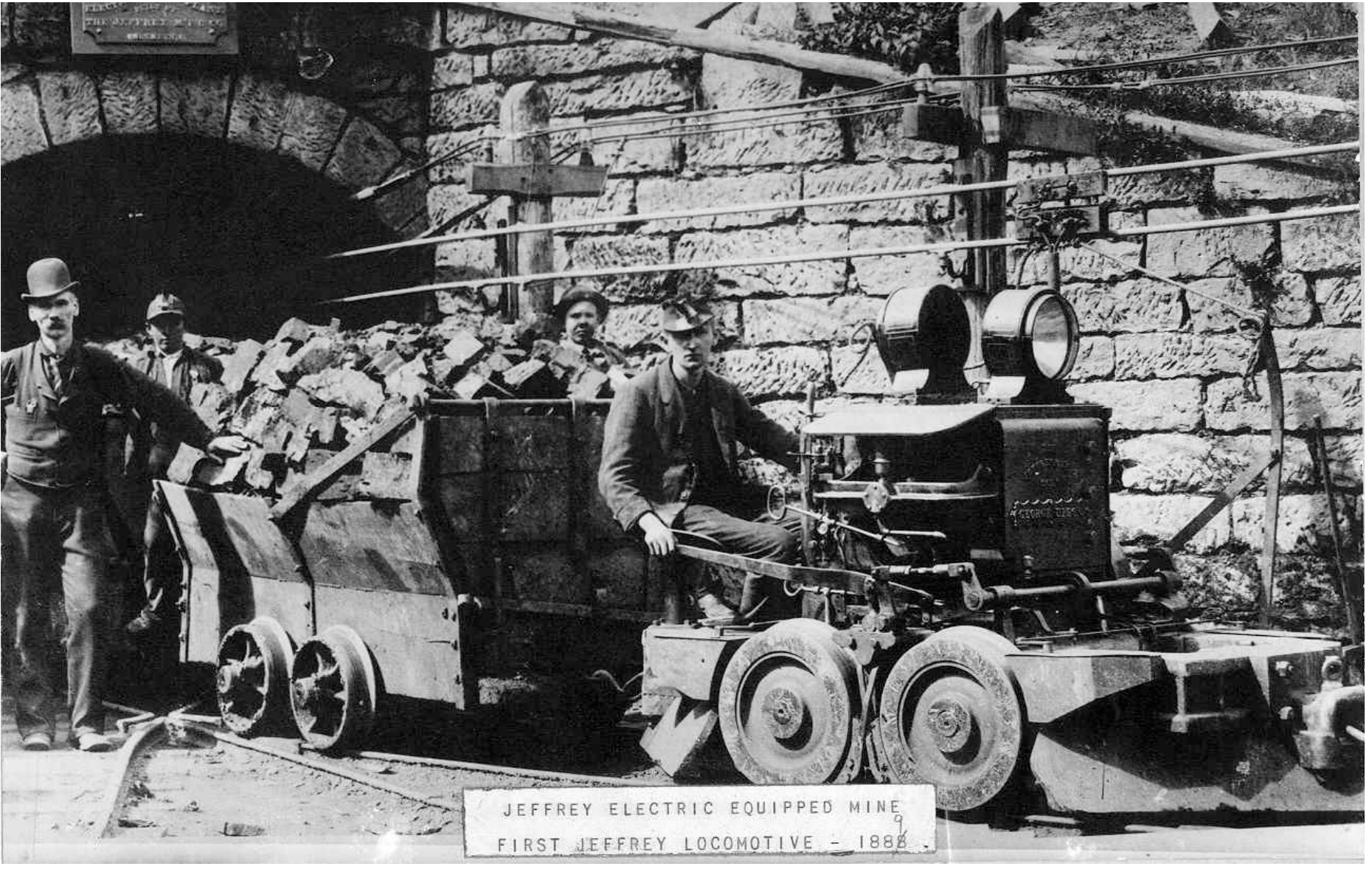
1888, electric locomotive at the mine.

Asbestos deposits were first identified in the area in 1879, and mining began shortly thereafter with financial backing from William Henry Jeffrey, for whom the mine was later named. In 1897, the property was acquired by the British Asbestos & Asbestic Company, and by World War I it had come under the control of the American firm H.W. Johns-Manville, which operated it until declaring bankruptcy in 1983. The mine was subsequently managed by JM Asbestos Inc. and later Jeffrey Mine Inc., employing thousands of workers over its long history. The Jeffrey Mine was developed as a vast open pit operation, eventually reaching a depth of more than 350 metres and covering nearly six square kilometres. At its peak, it produced hundreds of thousands of tonnes of chrysotile asbestos annually. The mine was also the site of the 1949 Asbestos Strike, when 5,000 miners walked off the job demanding safer conditions and better pay, an event seen as a turning point in Québec’s labour and political history. The Jeffrey Mine expanded so extensively over the decades that it physically encroached upon and reshaped the surrounding streets, neighbourhoods, and infrastructure.

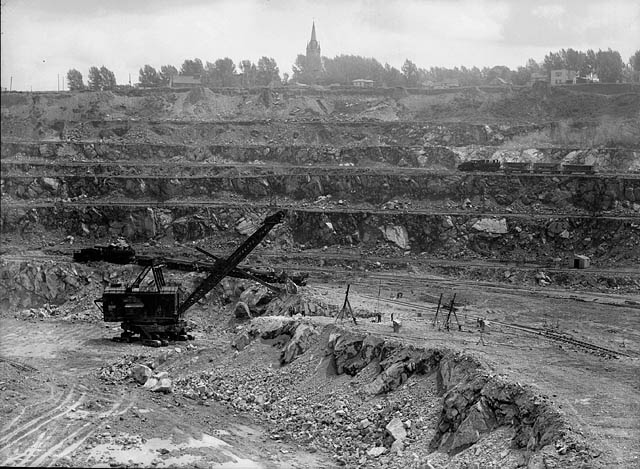
June 1944.

Declining global demand, health concerns related to asbestos exposure, and mounting regulatory pressures led to the mine’s gradual decline in the late 20th century. Despite government attempts to support renewed production, the Jeffrey Mine permanently closed in 2012. Unlike most mines, it did not close because the deposit was exhausted, but because of collapsing world markets and health concerns surrounding asbestos. Today, the vast open pit remains a striking landmark, and the town has sought to reinvent itself, officially changing its name from Asbestos to Val-des-Sources in 2020 to distance itself from the mine’s legacy.

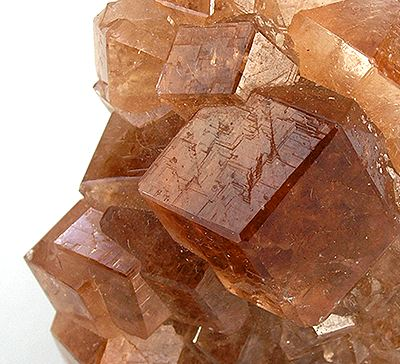
Grossular garnet from the mine.

== Aftermath ==
After the mine’s closure, the Quebec government created a $50-million regional diversification fund to attract new businesses, including a duck processing plant, a pharmaceutical company, a cheese factory, and a microbrewery referencing the town’s mining history. Some ventures closed, but the town gradually began to recover. Disused mine buildings were demolished, the open pit has started to re-vegetate, and Alliance Magnesium launched a pilot project to extract magnesium from tailings.

== Mineralogical significance ==
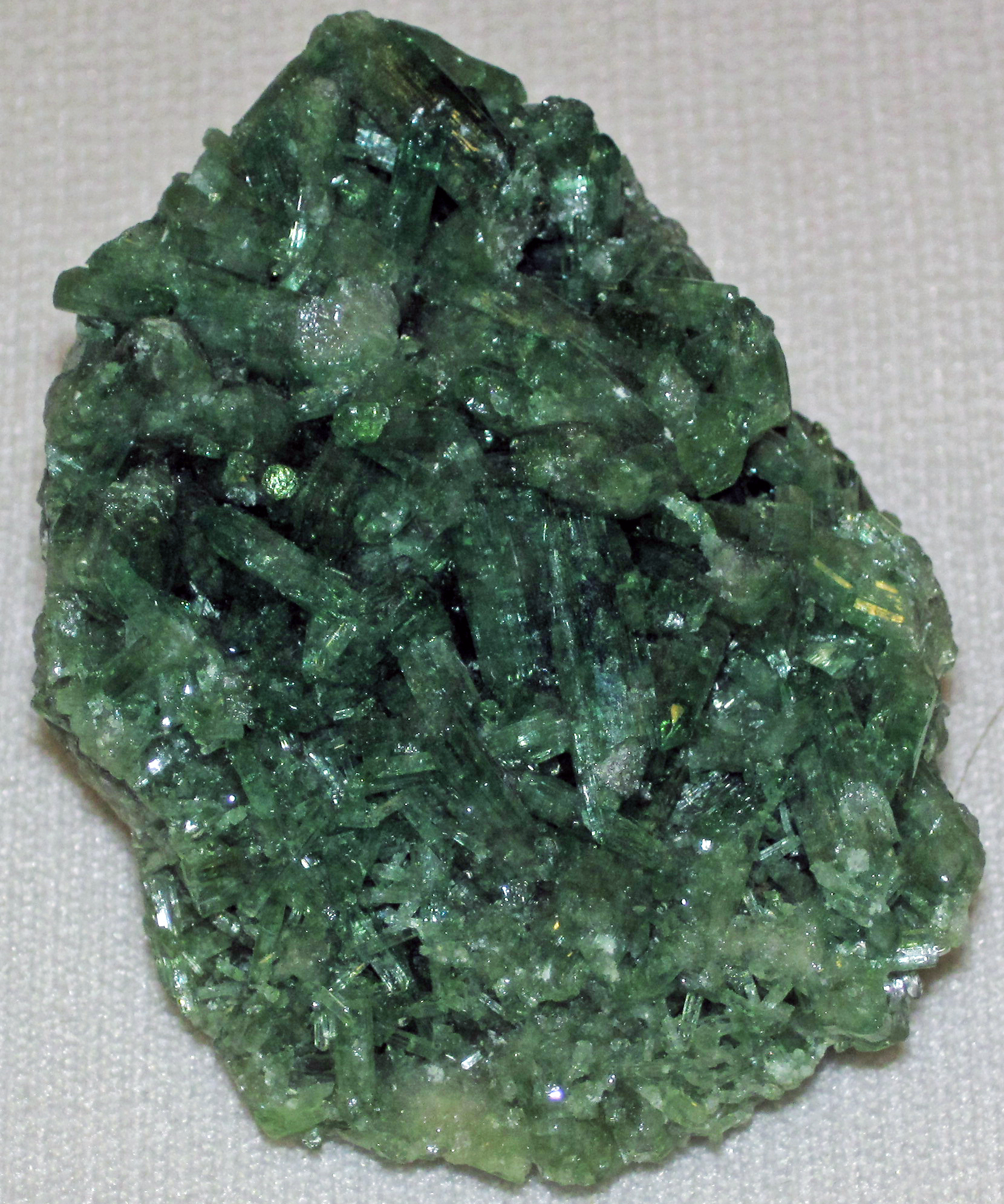
Vesuvianite from the mine.

Beyond asbestos, the Jeffrey Mine produces specimens of grossular garnet and vesuvianite in a wide range of colors, as well as prehnite and pectolite. The mine is also the type locality of two rare species, spertiniite and jeffreyite.

== See also ==
- Eastern Townships
- Economy of Quebec
- List of mines in Quebec
- Mining in Canada
