= Agnico Eagle =

Canadian-based gold producer

Agnico Eagle Mines Limited
- Type: Public
- Traded as: TSX: AEM; NYSE: AEM; S&P/TSX 60 component
- Industry: Mining & Gold Producers & Products Manufacturing
- Predecessor: Agnico Mines Limited; Eagle Gold Mines Limited
- Founded: 1 June 1972
- Founder: Paul Penna
- Headquarters: Toronto, Ontario, Canada
- Key people: Sean Boyd (Chair of the Board); Ammar Al-Joundi (CEO)
- Revenue: ▲US$11.908 billion (2025)
- Net income: ▲US$4.461 billion (2025)
- Total assets: ▲US$34.471 billion (2025)
- Total equity: ▲US$24.742 billion (2025)
- Number of employees: 18,216 (Dec 2025)
- Subsidiaries: Agnico-Eagle USA; Agnico Eagle Mexico, S.A. de C.V. Agnico Eagle Sweden AB; Agnico Eagle Finland Oy; Agnico Eagle Australia Pty Ltd; Fosterville Gold Mine Pty Ltd
- Website: www.agnicoeagle.com

Agnico Eagle Mines Limited is a Canadian gold producer with operations in Canada, Finland, Australia and Mexico and exploration and development activities extending to the United States. Agnico Eagle has full exposure to higher gold prices consistent with its policy of no-forward gold sales. It has paid a cash dividend every year since 1983.

== History ==
In 1953, five struggling mining companies joined to become Cobalt Consolidated Mining, which would last until 1957, when the company changed its name to Agnico Mines. "Agnico" is derived from the periodic table of elements using the symbols for silver (Ag), nickel (Ni) and cobalt (Co). In 1963, Paul Penna became the president of Agnico Mines, and he eventually oversaw the merger of Agnico Mines with Eagle Mines Ltd, a successful gold exploration company, enabling the development of Eagle's Joutel mining complex in northern Quebec. The newly formed company became Agnico Eagle Mines Limited.

In 1974, the Joutel mine went into production and would eventually produce approximately 1.1 million ounces of gold until its closure in 1993. During this period, Agnico Eagle also acquired the property and assets of Dumagami Mines Limited in north-western Quebec, which had recently gone into production a year earlier in 1988. The Dumagami mine would eventually be renamed the LaRonde mine, which is now considered the flagship mining operation for Agnico Eagle, and one of the largest gold deposits in Canada. With LaRonde producing steadily, Agnico Eagle acquired more assets over the following years.

In 1993, they completed the purchase of the Goldex mine, becoming the 100% owner of the largest unexploited gold deposit in Quebec. This was followed by the purchase of the Lapa gold deposit in 2000, Riddarhyttan Resources AB (the 100% owner of the Suurikuusikko gold deposit in northern Finland, which would become the Kittilä mine) in 2005, the Pinos Altos project in Mexico in 2006, and the purchase of Cumberland Resources in 2007, giving Agnico Eagle 100% control of the Meadowbank gold project in Nunavut, Canada.

As a result of these purchases, the following years would see Agnico Eagle grow from a single-operation gold producer (LaRonde) to a much larger company consisting of 6 mines in total, with Goldex going into production in 2008, Kittila, Lapa and Pinos Altos in 2009, and Meadowbank in 2010.

In 2010, Agnico Eagle completed the purchase of the Meliadine property, located southeast of Meadowbank near Rankin Inlet, Nunavut. In 2011, the company also announced a $70 million (CAD) investment in Rubicon Minerals, representing a 9.2% ownership stake and access to the Phoenix gold project located in the heart of Red Lake, Ontario.

In 2016, Agnico Eagle was ranked as the 14th best of 92 oil, gas, and mining companies on indigenous rights in Arctic resource extraction.

In 2018, CEO Sean Boyd received The Northern Miner's "Mining Person of the Year Award" at the annual Pacific Mine Forum (PMF).

In the 2021 Arctic Environmental Responsibility Index (AERI) Agnico Eagle Mines Limited was ranked no. 35 among 120 oil, gas, and mining companies involved in resource extraction north of the Arctic Circle.

In 2021, a $13.5 billion merger between Kirkland Lake Gold and Agnico consolidated the largest gold mines in Canada's Abitibi gold belt.

Company veteran Ammar Al-Joundi was appointed CEO of Agnico on 1 March 2022, after Tony Makuch, the holdover CEO from its merger with KL Gold, lasted only three weeks in the job and was fired by Sean Boyd who had progressed by then to the chair the amalgamated company, which at the time had a market capitalization of $29 billion.

=== Recent Developments (2025) ===
In 2025, Agnico Eagle Mines Limited completed the acquisition of 100% of O3 Mining Inc. for CAD $1.67 per share in cash, adding the Marban deposit in Québec to its development pipeline. The company reported record financial results, including third-quarter net income of US$1.055 billion (US$2.10 per share) and adjusted net income of US$1.085 billion (US$2.16 per share), supported by gold production of 866,936 ounces at an average realized price of US$3,476 per ounce. Agnico Eagle transitioned from a net debt position to net cash of US$2.16 billion, repaid US$550 million in debt, and returned US$300 million to shareholders through dividends and buybacks.

The company advanced several growth projects, including the Odyssey underground expansion at Canadian Malartic, development of an exploration ramp at Detour Lake, and resource expansion drilling at Hope Bay and Upper Beaver, where shaft construction was scheduled for late 2025. A feasibility study for the San Nicolás copper-zinc project in Mexico was expected by year-end.

In April 2025, Agnico Eagle published its 16th Sustainability Report, reaffirming its commitment to net-zero Scope 1 and 2 emissions by 2050, with an interim target of 30% reduction by 2030. The company increased investment in energy efficiency and low-carbon technologies and expanded community engagement and Indigenous partnerships.

== Operations ==
Agnico Eagle operates ten gold mines in Canada, Australia, Finland and Mexico. In 2025 they produced 3,447,367 ounces of payable gold.

=== LaRonde gold mine ===
The LaRonde mine, formerly Dumagami Mine, is located alongside the Trans-Canada highway in the Abitibi-Témiscamingue region between Rouyn-Noranda and Val-d'or, Quebec. The LaRonde complex consists of the LaRonde mine and the LaRonde Zone 5 (LZ5) mine.

LaRonde's Penna shaft, also known as shaft 3, was completed to a depth of 2,250 metres in 2000 and is believed to be the deepest single lift shaft in the Western Hemisphere. Workings at the LaRonde mine reach more than three kilometres below the surface. The estimated mine life is to 2034 for LaRonde and 2036 for LZ5. The operation mines gold, silver, zinc and copper ores. In 2025 payable production was 344,555 ounces of gold, 671,148 ounces of silver, 8,446 tonnes of zinc and 2,431 tonnes of copper, and 330,000 to 350,000 ounces of gold are expected in 2026. At December 31, 2025 the LaRonde mine had proven and probable reserves of about 1.96 million ounces of gold and LZ5 had 889,000 ounces. The complex had 1,218 permanent employees.

The mine was renamed to the LaRonde Mine by company founder Paul Penna, to honour its first project manager, mining engineer Donald J. "Don" LaRonde (c. 1931–1986).

=== Goldex ===
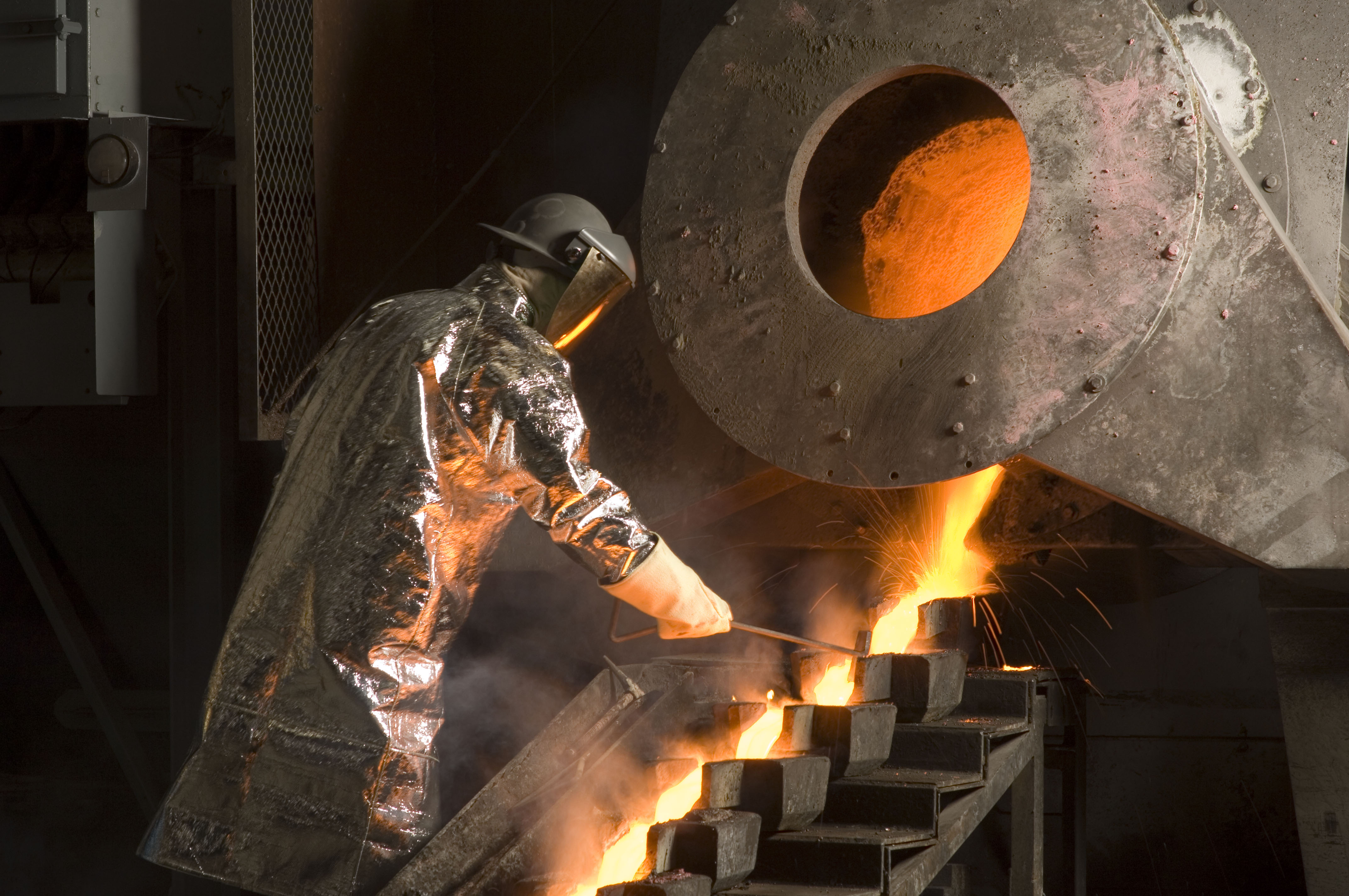
Pouring Gold into molds

The Goldex complex consists of the Goldex underground mine, located just outside Val-d'Or, Quebec, Canada, and the Akasaba West open pit mine, which began production in February 2024. The mine is expected to run until 2032 and has about 500 permanent employees. In 2025 Goldex produced 125,501 ounces of gold, and 115,000 to 125,000 ounces are expected in 2026. At December 31, 2025 Goldex had proven and probable reserves of about 786,000 ounces of gold, with a further 112,000 ounces at Akasaba West. Goldex is unique due to its partnership with the Quebec government in the restoration of the nearby abandoned Manitou mine tailings site. Through an innovative approach, the tailings from the Goldex mine are sent through a 25 km long pipeline to the Manitou site where they neutralize the acidic waters in the area, the result of years of poorly confined tailings generated between 1942 and 1979 by the mining companies operating the Manitou project at the time. Not only do the Goldex tailings neutralize and help rehabilitate the site, but the system also eliminates the need for a tailings pond at the Goldex site itself.

=== Lapa ===
Lapa, located about 11 km away from the LaRonde mine (see above), in the Rivière-Héva municipality of the Abitibi region in Quebec, Canada, began production in 2009 as one of Agnico Eagle's smaller operations, with an original mine life estimate of six years (2009–2015). The main headframe used at the Lapa mine was constructed almost entirely from a pre-existing headframe at LaRonde. The original headframe was dismantled, sand blasted and painted before it was installed at Lapa. Lapa was one of Agnico Eagle's highest-grade mines, with reserve grades twice as rich as the company average. Lapa is not among the operating mines listed in the Company's 2025 Annual Information Form.

=== Kittilä ===
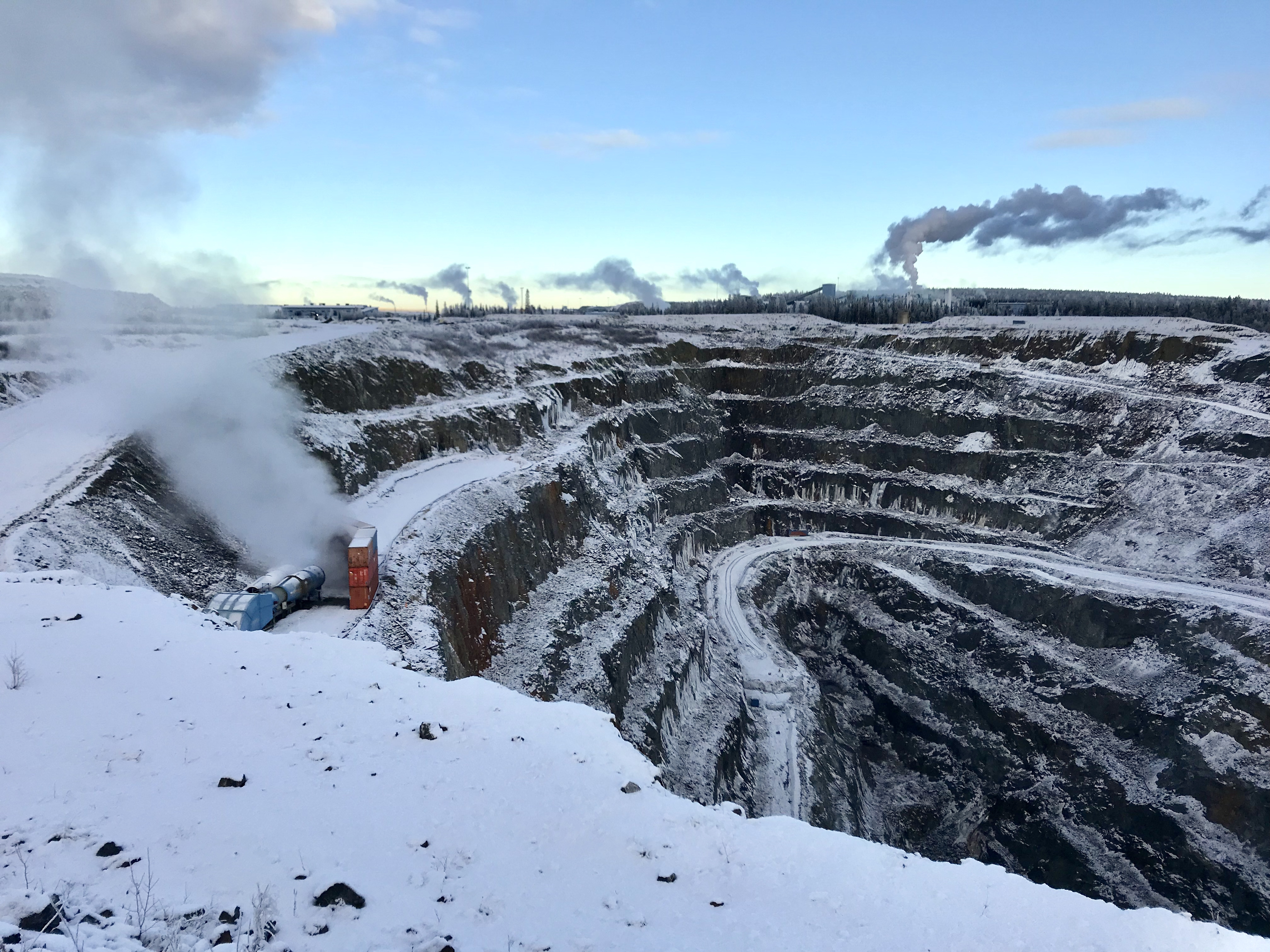
Open Pit Mining in Kittilä, Finland

In the Lapland region of Northern Finland, Agnico Eagle's Kittilä underground mine was acquired in 2005 through the purchase of Riddarhyttan Resources and achieved commercial production in May 2009. Its estimated mine life runs to 2037. The mine has 420 permanent employees, with an additional 13 in the Finnish exploration group, and is one of the largest known gold deposits in all of Europe. In 2025 Kittilä produced 217,379 ounces of gold, and 210,000 to 230,000 ounces are expected in 2026. At December 31, 2025 it had proven and probable reserves of about 3.3 million ounces of gold (24.7 million tonnes grading 4.17 grams per tonne).

=== Pinos Altos ===
Pinos Altos is an open pit and underground mine located in the state of Chihuahua, in northern Mexico, in the mountainous Sierra Madre gold and silver belt. It began commercial production in November 2009 and its estimated mine life runs to 2028. In 2025 it produced 81,734 ounces of gold and 1,013,000 ounces of silver, and 70,000 to 80,000 ounces of gold are expected in 2026. At December 31, 2025 it had proven and probable reserves of approximately 269,000 ounces of gold.

=== La India ===
La India is an open pit mine located approximately 200 km east of Hermosillo in Sonora, Mexico. It began production in February 2014 and reached the end of its mine life, producing 4,539 ounces of gold from residual leaching in 2025.

=== Meadowbank ===
The Meadowbank complex, in the Kivalliq Region of Nunavut, consists of the mining, milling and processing operations at the Meadowbank mine, located approximately 70 km north of Baker Lake, and the mining operations at the Amaruq open pit and underground mines. Meadowbank achieved commercial production in March 2010, Amaruq in September 2019, and the Amaruq underground operations on August 1, 2022. The estimated mine life runs to 2030 and the complex has 914 permanent employees. In 2010 the first gold brick was poured at Meadowbank, which was also the first ever gold brick to be poured in the history of Nunavut. In 2025 the complex produced 493,314 ounces of gold, and 475,000 to 495,000 ounces are expected in 2026. At December 31, 2025 it had proven and probable reserves of approximately 1.45 million ounces of gold.

=== Meliadine ===
Meliadine is an underground and open pit mine near Rankin Inlet in the Kivalliq Region of Nunavut. Agnico Eagle acquired the property in July 2010 through its purchase of Comaplex Minerals; construction began in 2017 and commercial production was achieved in May 2019. The estimated mine life runs to 2036. In 2025 Meliadine produced 376,346 ounces of gold, and 380,000 to 400,000 ounces are expected in 2026. At December 31, 2025 it had proven and probable reserves of approximately 3.6 million ounces of gold.

=== Canadian Malartic ===
The Canadian Malartic complex is located in the town of Malartic, Quebec, about 25 km west of Val-d'Or, and consists of the Canadian Malartic open pit mine and mill and the Odyssey underground mine. Agnico Eagle acquired a 50% interest in 2014 through its joint acquisition of Osisko Mining with Yamana Gold, and acquired the remaining 50% on March 31, 2023. The open pit operation comprises the Canadian Malartic and Barnat pits; the Canadian Malartic pit was depleted in 2023, and the Barnat pit was expected to remain in production until 2029. Production at the Odyssey underground mine began in March 2023 and totalled 90,906 ounces of gold in 2025. In 2025 the complex produced 642,612 ounces of gold and 336,517 ounces of silver, and at December 31, 2025 it had proven and probable reserves of approximately 9.05 million ounces of gold (including the Marban deposit, acquired with O3 Mining in 2025). The estimated mine life runs to 2042 and the complex has 1,433 permanent employees.

On July 1, 2026, a rock mass movement occurred along the north wall of the Barnat open pit and the Company temporarily suspended mining in the pit, supplying the mill with low-grade stockpiled ore in the interim. The Company expected the event to reduce production at Canadian Malartic by approximately 60,000 to 80,000 ounces of gold in the second half of 2026, and said it did not affect the development or production outlook for Odyssey. The Company subsequently estimated reductions of up to 150,000 ounces in each of 2027 and 2028, and expects 2026 company-wide production near the lower end of its 3.3 to 3.5 million ounce guidance range.

=== Detour Lake Mine ===
The open-pit Detour Lake operation is the largest gold producing mine in Canada with the country's largest gold mineral reserves. It produced 692,675 ounces of gold in 2025 and hosted 18.6 million ounces of gold in proven and probable mineral reserves at year-end 2025.

Located within the northernmost Abitibi Greenstone Belt, the mine was originally owned by Placer Dome and operated primarily as an underground mine from 1987 to 1990. Production resumed in 2013 as an open-pit mine under the ownership of Detour Gold Corporation. Agnico Eagle acquired its interest in the Detour Lake mine on February 8, 2022. The estimated mine life runs to 2052 and the mine has 1,736 permanent employees. The Company is evaluating an underground project at Detour Lake, with a potential approval decision in 2027.

=== Macassa Mine ===
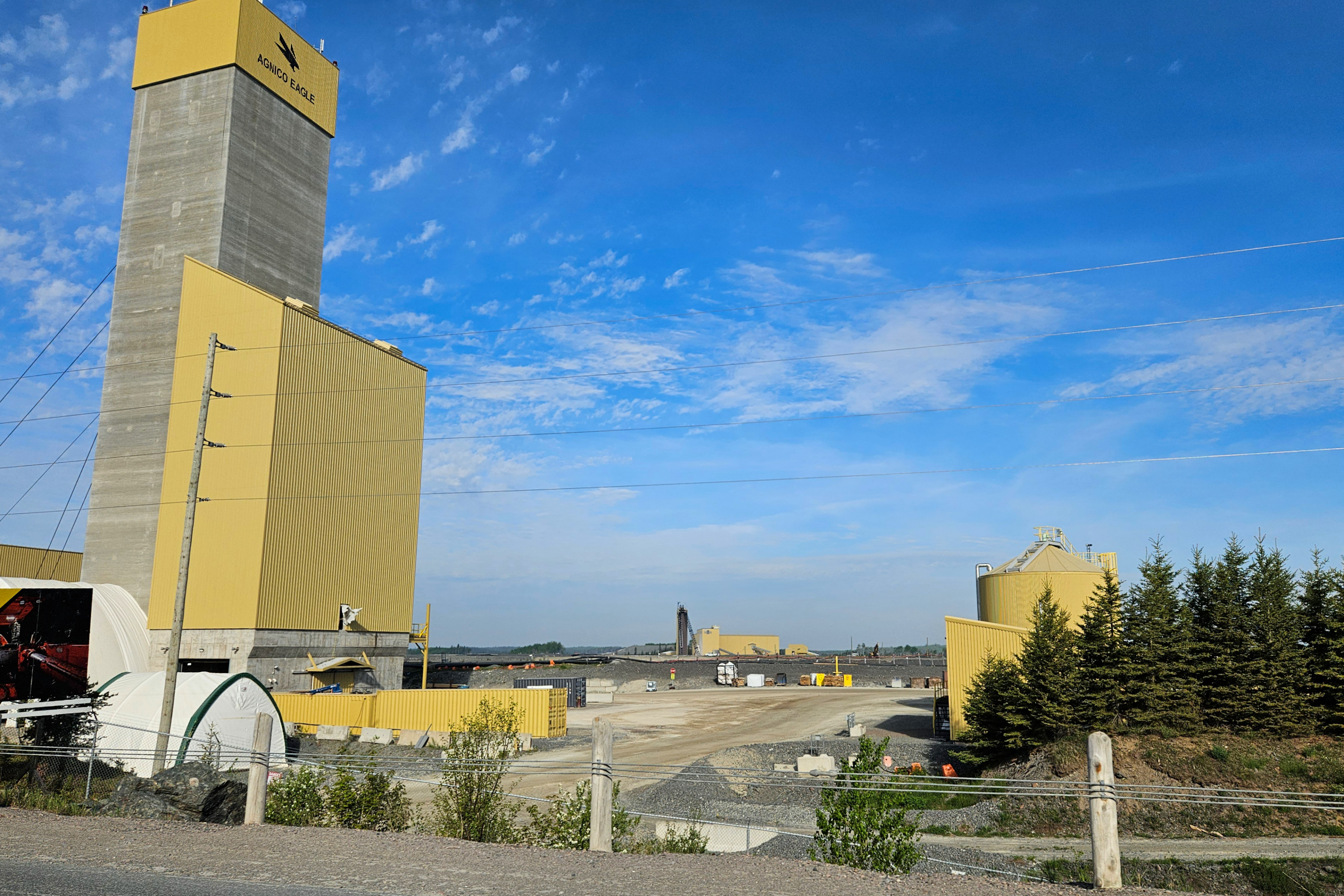
Macassa Mine in Kirkland Lake

With exploration beginning in 1931 and first production beginning in 1933, Macassa remains one of the world's highest-grade gold mines. The #4 Shaft production hoist, commissioned in 2023, has started a new chapter in the life of the Macassa mine, increasing production, improving working conditions, lowering unit costs and increasing exploration capacity. The estimated mine life runs to 2032 and the mine has 1,289 permanent employees. In 2025 Macassa produced 312,729 ounces of gold, and 305,000 to 325,000 ounces are expected in 2026. At December 31, 2025 it had proven and probable reserves of approximately 2.2 million ounces of gold (8.8 million tonnes grading 7.77 grams per tonne), including the nearby Macassa Near Surface and AK deposits.

=== Fosterville ===
Fosterville is an underground gold mine in Victoria, Australia, about 20 km northeast of Bendigo and 130 km north of Melbourne. It achieved commercial production in April 2005 and was acquired by Agnico Eagle on February 8, 2022 through its acquisition of Kirkland Lake Gold; its estimated mine life runs to 2037. In 2025 Fosterville produced 160,522 ounces of gold, down from the prior year because of lower grade and throughput, and 140,000 to 160,000 ounces are expected in 2026. At December 31, 2025 it had proven and probable reserves of approximately 1.7 million ounces of gold (10.4 million tonnes grading 4.99 grams per tonne).

=== Development projects ===
==== Hope Bay ====
Hope Bay, in Nunavut, was acquired through the 2021 purchase of TMAC Resources. The Company began construction activities at Hope Bay in 2026, and the project has potential for 400,000 to 435,000 ounces of annual gold production, with ramp-up expected from 2030.

==== Upper Beaver ====
Upper Beaver, located about 20 km from the Macassa mine, is envisioned as a standalone mine and mill with potential to produce 200,000 to 225,000 ounces of gold and 3,600 tonnes of copper per year, with ramp-up expected from 2030. Exploration ramp development and shaft sinking were under way as of the third quarter of 2026.

== Exploration ==
The 2011 exploration program is expected to include more than 410 km of planned drilling to expand resources and convert our large gold resource to reserves. Major programs are planned at the following locations:

Meliadine – 90,000 meters of diamond drilling, an underground bulk sample, new permanent accommodations at the exploration camp, permitting infrastructure upgrades.

Kittilä – 56,200 meters of exploration and conversion drilling, and construction of an exploration ramp to accelerate the definition of resources and facilitate additional exploration at depth.

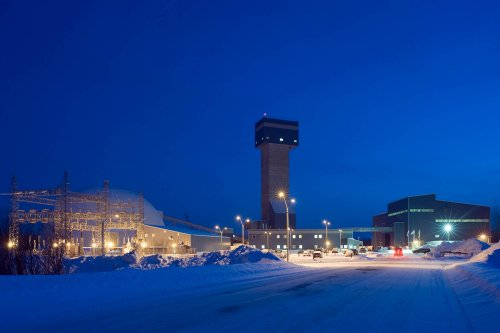
Goldex Mining Headquarters

Goldex – 58,200 meters of diamond drilling will principally target resource expansion for the D zone. Pending the results of a planned mining study in 2011, a reserve conversion program will also be considered.

LaRonde/Bousquet/Ellison – 42,050 meters of drilling, which includes a follow-up exploration program for Ellison.

Pinos Altos – 33,800 meters of drilling including minesite (reserve conversion) and regional (resource expansion) drilling, and an underground exploration program and scoping study for the Cubiro zone.

Meadowbank – 32,000 meters of conversion and exploration drilling targeting extensions of the Vault deposit and underground potential beneath Goose South.

Gilt Edge – In 2018, a former gold mine in South Dakota was acquired in an exploration-environmental partnership with the EPA.

In December 2016 Agnico invested CA$4.5 million into Canadian junior mining company Cartier Resources to conduct exploration on the Chimo, Benoist, Wilson, Fenton and Cadillac Extension projects in Quebec.

== Carbon footprint ==
Agnico-Eagle Mines Group reported Total CO2e emissions (Direct + Indirect) for 31 December 2020 at 578 Kt (+57/+11% y-o-y). The growth accelerated compared to the long-term upward trend (CAGR of +7.6% since 4Q'16).

Agnico-Eagle Mines Group's Total CO2e emissions (Direct + Indirect) (in kilotonnes)
Dec 2015	Dec 2016	Dec 2017	Dec 2018	Dec 2019	Dec 2020
407	400	415	411	521	578

== Controversies ==
In 2025, Agnico Eagle faced regulatory and community challenges in Nunavut. A federal investigation found violations of caribou protection measures at the Whale Tail and Meadowbank mines, including failure to secure Free, Prior, and Informed Consent (FPIC) from Indigenous stakeholders. The company also withdrew its proposal to extend the Meliadine mine after the Nunavut Impact Review Board recommended against it due to environmental concerns, particularly impacts on the Qamanirjuaq caribou herd.
