= Jilin Horoc =

Chinese mining company

Jilin Horoc is a China company that is interested in the nonferrous metals. It is mainly interested in nickel products. It owns, through a subsidiary structure, 100% of the Nunavik Nickel mine, product from which it ships to its Panshi City nickel sulphate plant in Jilin, China. It employed nearly 10,000 people as of 2025.

== History ==
In September 2003, Jilin Jien Nickel Industry Co. was listed on the A-share market of the Shanghai Stock Exchange with the stock code 600432. Jilin Jien is a subsidiary of Jilin Horoc.

In autumn 2009 Jilin Jien bought for $192.5 million a distressed property named Canadian Royalties, which held the Nunavik mine outright.

In June 2010 Anshan Iron & Steel Group announced it had signed an agreement with Jilin Horoc for the long-term supply of nickel. Anshan wanted to get into the stainless steel and specialty metals industry.

By 2013 Jilin Jien had invested $800 million more in the Nunavik mine.

As of 2013, Jilin Jien's mining investments were located in Canada, Australia, Indonesia, Russia, the Philippines and Papua New Guinea.

The Nunavik mine was in 2023 Canada's fifth most productive nickel mine.
