= Meadowbank Gold Mine =

Gold mine in Nunavut, Canada

- Location
- Location: Nunavut, Canada; 65°01′07″N 096°04′26″W
- Opened: 2010
- Closed: 2019
- Company: Agnico-Eagle Mines
- Website: www.agnico-eagle.com

The Meadowbank Gold Mine is an open pit gold mine operated by Agnico-Eagle Mines in the Kivalliq district of Nunavut, Canada approximately 300 km west of Hudson Bay. Meadowbank was Agnico Eagle’s first Low Arctic mine.

== Discovery ==
Discoveries of gold-containing Archean greenstone in the Baker Lake region were made in the 1980s. Asamera Minerals and Complex set out as partners in the project. The Third Portage deposit was discovered in 1987; this was followed by the discovery of the Goose Island deposit, and the North Portage deposit. Cumberland completed their acquisition of Complex's share in the discovery in 1997 taking sole ownership of the project. Since then three further discoveries have been made including the Vault deposit (October 2000), the PDF deposit (October 2002) and the Cannu zone (September 2005).

The entire area has probable gold reserves of 3.5 million ounces (29.3 million tonnes of ore at 3.7 grams per tonne) and is open on strike and at depth.

== Geology ==
The Meadowbank and Amaruq projects are underlain by Archean-age volcanic and sedimentary rocks of the Woodburn Lake Group. At the Amaruq property, three significant gold-bearing quartz-pyrrhotite-arsenopyrite veining/flooding within volcano-sedimerntary rocks have been discovered. These locations include Whale Tail, V Zone (IVR) and Mammoth.

== Construction and operation ==
Construction of the mine was completed and the mine was opened in June 2010.

The original mine at Meadowbank achieved commercial production in March 2010 and produced its three millionth ounce of gold in 2018 though ceased operations in 2019. However, the support infrastructure and mill facilities at the original site are still being used for supporting a new satellite mine at Amaruq, which gradually transitioned operations from the original mine.

== See also ==
- Meadowbank Aerodrome
