= LaRonde mine =

Gold mine in Quebec, Canada

LaRonde Mine
- Location in Canada
- Location: Canada, Quebec; 48°14′54.3″N 78°26′30.01″W
- Products: Gold; Silver; Copper; Zinc
- Opened: 1988
- Company: Agnico-Eagle Mines
- Website: LaRonde Complex

The LaRonde Mine is a gold mine in the Abitibi-Témiscamingue region 62 kilometres (39 mi) west of Val-d'Or in Quebec, Canada.

LaRonde began commercial mining operations in 1988. The LaRonde mining complex has 3.8 million ounces of gold in provable and probable reserves. Previous operations at the LaRonde complex used open-pit mining methods. Presently, operations are primarily underground. The mine's Penna shaft, also known as shaft 3, is believed to be the deepest single lift shaft in the Western Hemisphere, descending more than three kilometres (or 9800ft) below the surface. It is expected that the mine will continue operations until 2032 and currently employs 1,042 workers.

== LaRonde Zone 5 mine ==
The LaRonde Zone 5 mine (LZ5) was acquired by the company in 2003 and began commercial operation in June 2018 after approval for development in February 2017. The LZ5 mine was integrated into the LaRonde Complex in 2020. Agnico Eagle reports that LZ5 has provable and probable reserves of 852,000 ounces of gold.

The project primarily consists of gold-copper and zinc-silver mineralization.

Dry stack tailings facilities were commissioned in 2022, aligning with sustainability objectives. The planned idling of the LZ5 processing facility in late 2023 aims to optimize capacity within the LaRonde complex.

== Production ==
The operation currently produces roughly 300,000 ounces of gold per year.

The facility also treats concentrate pulp from the Goldex mill.

Agnico Eagle plans on an addition $12 million exploration project.
