= Val-des-Sources =

- Town
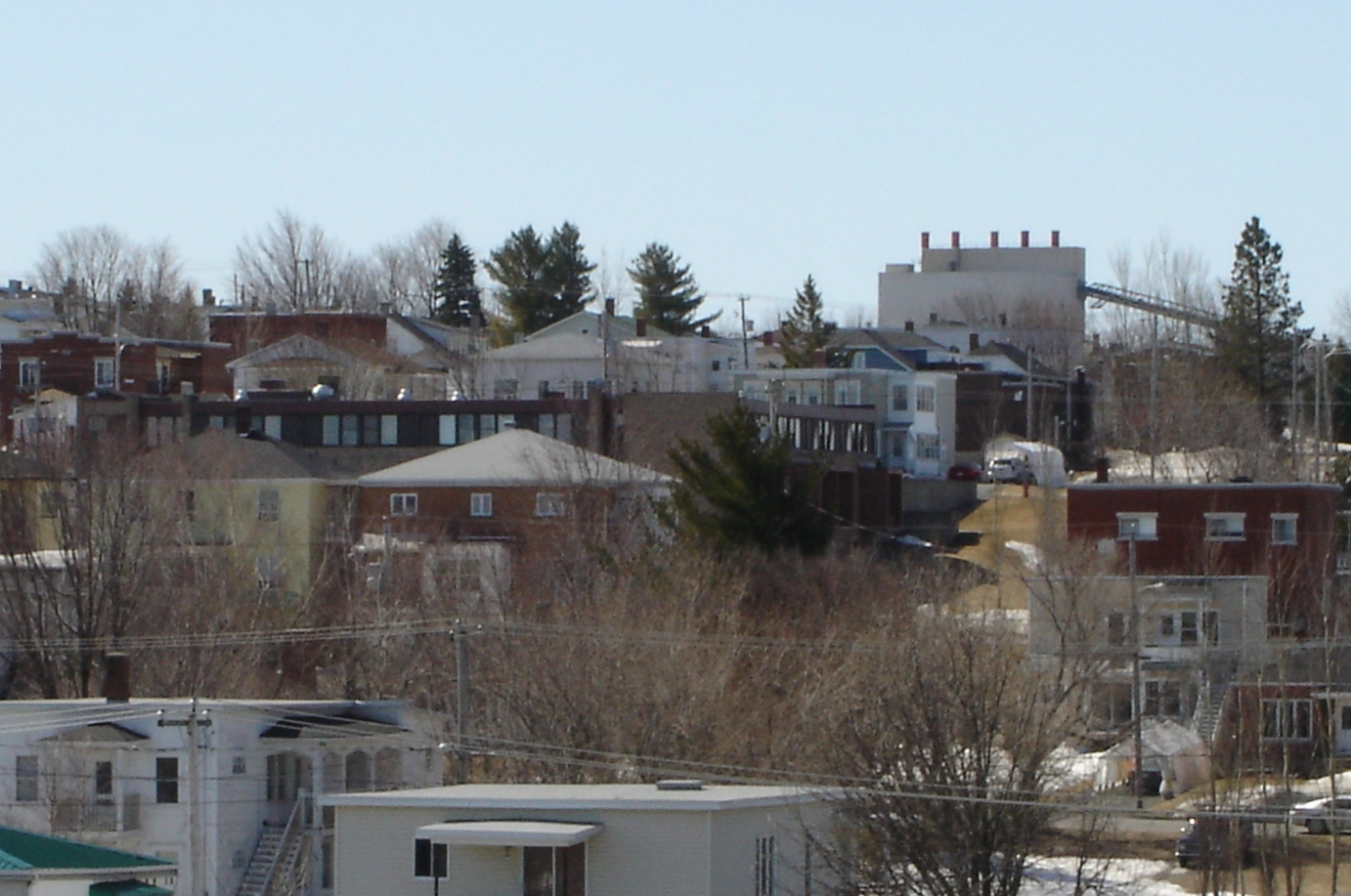
- Scene from Val-des-Sources

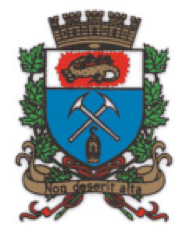
- Coat of arms Logo
- Motto: Non deserit alta
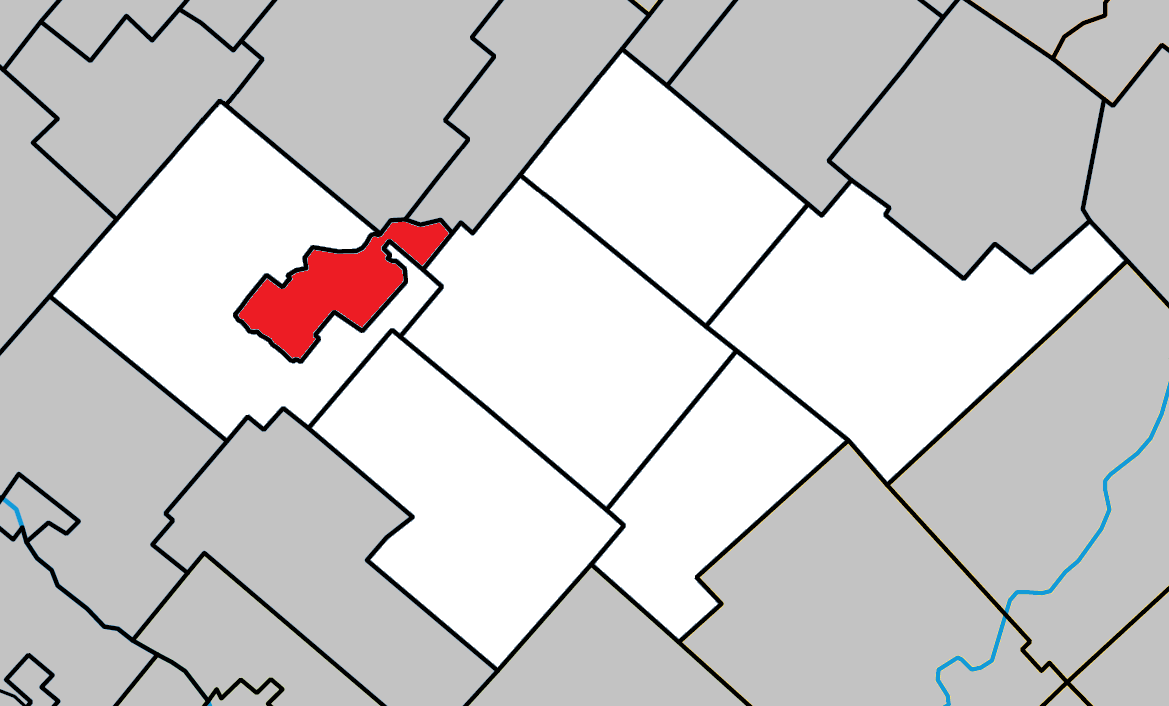
- Location within Les Sources RCM.

- Location in southern Quebec
- Coordinates: 45°46′N 71°56′W
- Country: Canada
- Province: Quebec
- Region: Estrie
- RCM: Les Sources
- Constituted: December 8, 1999
- Name change: December 15, 2020

Government
  - Mayor: Hugues Grimard
  - Federal riding: Richmond—Arthabaska—des-Sources
  - Prov. riding: Mégantic

Area
  - Town: 31.70 km^{2} (12.24 sq mi)
  - Land: 30.25 km^{2} (11.68 sq mi)

Population (2021)
  - Town: 7,088
  - Density: 234.3/km^{2} (607/sq mi)
  - Urban: 5,623
  - Pop 2016-2021: ▲4.5%
- Time zone: UTC−5 (EST)
  - Summer (DST): UTC−4 (EDT)
- Postal code(s): J1T
- Area code: 819
- Highways: R-249; R-255
- Website: valdessources.ca

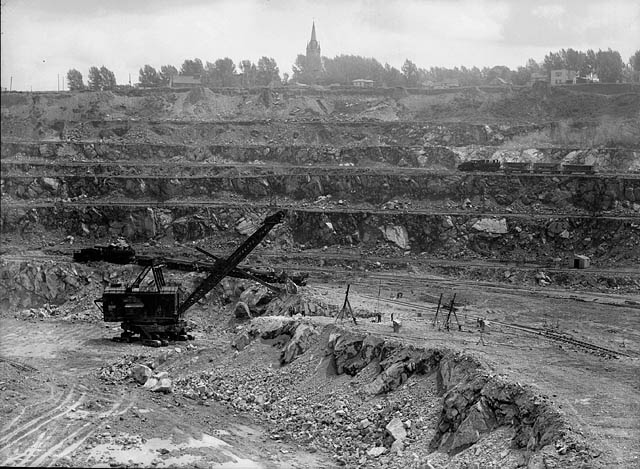
Canada's biggest power shovel loading an ore train with asbestos at the Jeffrey Mine, Johns-Manville Co., Asbestos, Quebec, June 1944.

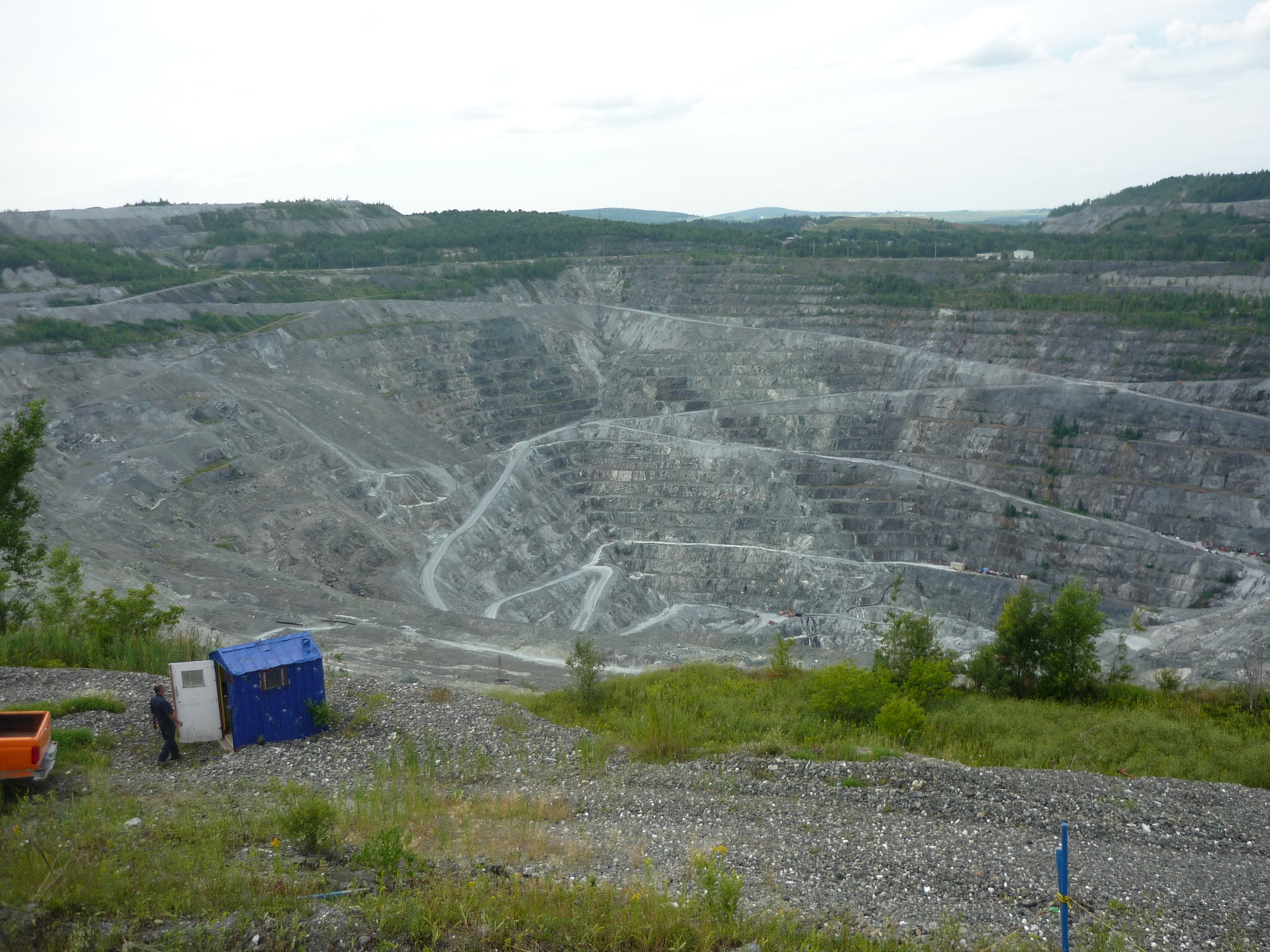
Dimensions of the mine in August 2011: width 2 km (1.2 mi), depth 370 metres (1,210 ft).

Val-des-Sources (French pronunciation: [val de suʁs]), meaning "Valley of the Springs", formerly known as Asbestos (pronounced [asbɛstɔs]), is a town on the Nicolet River in the Estrie (Eastern Townships) region of southeastern Quebec, Canada. The town is the seat of Les Sources Regional County Municipality, formerly known as the Asbestos Regional County Municipality. The town covers an area of 30.25 square kilometres (11.68 mi^{2}), including land acquired due to the merger of the City of Asbestos with the Municipality of Trois-Lacs on December 8, 1999.

At the 2021 census, 7,088 people resided in the town. It is situated in the centre of a square formed by the cities of Drummondville, Sherbrooke and Victoriaville, and the Nicolet River to the north.

Due to the negative connotations of the name Asbestos, discussions took place around whether the town should be renamed. A municipal referendum held in October 2020 selected Val-des-Sources as the new name. The change came into effect on December 15, 2020.

== History ==
The environs were not favourable for agriculture but the town grew around the Jeffrey Mine, named after William Henry Jeffrey. The mine was the world’s largest source of asbestos and its dominant employer. It expanded so extensively over the decades that it physically encroached upon and reshaped the surrounding streets, neighbourhoods, and infrastructure.

The town was the site of the 1949 Asbestos strike.

During the 1960s the town was thriving and could afford to expand and invest in its infrastructure and municipal architecture. It built a new modern town hall whose main hallway was adorned with a mural by the artist Denis Juneau, as well as some ceramic pieces in the church by famed ceramist Claude Vermette.

In 2000 the Magnola magnesium refinery began operation. The project was the brainchild of Noranda Inc, to repurpose waste asbestos tailings a proprietary electrolytic process. By 2011 it had been shuttered.

In summer of 2011, mayor Christian Lefrançois authorized the construction of two new asbestos mines, including at the infamous Jeffrey mine, known for its effects on the local residents’ health. However, in late 2011, the mine halted operations. In June 2012, a $58-million loan was promised by the Quebec government to restart and operate the Jeffrey mine for the next 20 years. Before the loan funds were delivered, the Parti Québécois defeated the Quebec Liberal Party in the September 2012 Quebec provincial election. The Parti Québécois followed through with an election promise to halt asbestos mining, cancel the loan, and fund economic diversification in the area.

=== Name change ===
At various times since the decline of asbestos mining, residents and politicians in the area have proposed changing the town's name due to its negative connotations; however, past proposals often failed, with people involved in the debate noting, since the mineral is referred to as amiante rather than asbestos in French, its predominantly Francophone residents do not typically associate the town's name with the stigma around the mineral.

A name change plan was approved by the municipal council in November 2019, with the new name chosen by a public poll. On September 14, 2020, the mayor announced that residents would be able to vote to rename the town to either Apalone, Jeffrey, Phénix or Trois-Lacs. The choices were not well received, and more names were added to the list. A referendum was held in October to allow the townspeople to choose from among six names: L'Azur-des-Cantons, Jeffrey-sur-le-Lac, Larochelle, Trois-Lacs, Val-des-Sources, or Phénix. The referendum results were announced on October 19, 2020. 51.5% of voters chose the name Val-des-Sources in the third round of a preferential ballot. In Quebec, a municipal name change must be proposed to the Commission de toponymie du Québec and then approved by the Ministry of Municipal Affairs and Housing before it takes effect, which occurred on December 17, 2020. For most purposes the name change took immediate effect, although the town's rebranding of its own billboards was not expected to take place until January 2021, and Canada Post required until April 19, 2021, to complete the necessary changes in its postal addressing system.

Some residents who remained opposed to the name change organized a petition drive calling on the Ministry of Municipal Affairs to deny its approval, on the grounds that not enough of the town's residents participated in the referendum, and that the referendum did not include any option to express a preference for maintaining the existing name. Minister Andrée Laforest rejected the petition and approved the name change, which came into effect on December 15, 2020.

== Demographics ==
Historical populations
| Year | Pop. | ±% |
|---|---|---|
| 1901 | 783 | — |
| 1911 | 2,224 | +184.0% |
| 1921 | 2,189 | −1.6% |
| 1931 | 4,396 | +100.8% |
| 1941 | 5,711 | +29.9% |
| 1951 | 8,190 | +43.4% |
| 1956 | 8,969 | +9.5% |
| 1961 | 11,083 | +23.6% |
| 1966 | 10,534 | −5.0% |
| 1971 | 10,254 | −2.7% |
| 1976 | 9,075 | −11.5% |
| 1981 | 7,967 | −12.2% |
| 1986 | 6,961 | −12.6% |
| 1991 | 6,487 | −6.8% |
| 1996 | 6,271 | −3.3% |
| 2001 | 6,580 | +4.9% |
| 2006 | 6,819 | +3.6% |
| 2011 | 7,096 | +4.1% |
| 2016 | 6,786 | −4.4% |
| 2021 | 7,088 | +4.5% |

In the 2021 Census of Population conducted by Statistics Canada, Val-des-Sources had a population of 7,088 living in 3,460 of its 3,691 total private dwellings, a change of 4.5% from its 2016 population of 6,786. With a land area of 30.25 km^{2} (11.68 sq mi), it had a population density of 234.3/km^{2} (606.9/sq mi) in 2021.

Canada census – Val-des-Sources community profile

| | 2021 | 2016 | 2011 |
| Population | 7.088 (+4.5% from 2016) | 6,786 (-4.4% from 2011) | 7,096 (+4.1% from 2006) |
| Land area | 30.25 km^{2} (11.68 sq mi) | 30.41 km^{2} (11.74 sq mi) | 29.67 km^{2} (11.46 sq mi) |
| Population density | 234.3/km^{2} (607/sq mi) | 223.1/km^{2} (578/sq mi) | 239.1/km^{2} (619/sq mi) |
| Median age | 55.2 (M: 52.4, F: 57.6) | 54.0 (M: 51.8, F: 56.2) | 51.1 (M: 48.4, F: 53.5) |
| Private dwellings | 3,691 (total) | 3,503 (total) | 3,467 (total) |
| Median household income | $48,000 | $41,301 | $36,994 |

Notes: Population in 1996: 6,793 (+4.7% from 1991) - Population in 1991: 6,487
Includes corrections and updates for 1996.
References: 2021 2016 2011

Religion (2021)

| Religion | Population | Percentage | % (of total in Quebec) |
|---|---|---|---|
| Catholic | 4,970 | 74.3% | 0.11% |
| No religious affiliation | 1,285 | 19.2% | 0.06% |
| Protestant | 110 | 1.6% | 0.40% |
| Muslim | 25 | 0.4% | 0.006% |

| Canada 2021 Census | | Population | % of Total Population |
|---|---|---|---|
Visible minority group Source:
| Visible minority group Source: | Latin American | 50 | 0.7 |
| Visible minority group Source: | Arab | 25 | 0.4 |
| Visible minority group Source: | Chinese | 15 | 0.2 |
| Visible minority group Source: | South Asian | 10 | 0.1 |
| Total visible minority population | | 125 | 1.9 |
| Indigenous group Source: | First Nations | 95 | 1.4 |
| Indigenous group Source: | Métis | 50 | 0.7 |
| Total Aboriginal population | | 145 | 2.2 |
| White | | 6,425 | 96.0 |
| Total population | | 6,695 | 100 |

In terms of mother tongue, the 2021 census found that, including multiple responses, almost 97% of residents spoke French, and about 3% of residents spoke English. The next most commonly reported first languages learned were Spanish, Arabic and Italian.

| Mother Tongue | Population (2016) | Percentage (2016) | Population (2021) | Percentage (2021) |
|---|---|---|---|---|
| French | 6,505 | 97.2% | 6,650 | 96.1% |
| English | 90 | 1.3% | 140 | 2.0% |
| English and French | 40 | 0.6% | 60 | 0.9% |
| English, French and a non-official language | 5 | 0.1% | 5 | 0.1% |
| French and a non-official language | 0 | 0.0% | 5 | 0.1% |
| Multiple non-official languages | 0 | 0.0% | 5 | 0.1% |
| Spanish | 15 | 0.1% | 25 | 0.4% |
| Arabic | 10 | 0.1% | 5 | 0.1% |
| German | 10 | 0.1% | 5 | 0.1% |
| Italian | 5 | 0.1% | 5 | 0.1% |
| Mandarin | 5 | 0.1% | 5 | 0.1% |
| Tagalog | 5 | 0.1% | 0 | 0.0% |
| Polish | 5 | 0.1% | 0 | 0.0% |
| Ukrainian | 5 | 0.1% | 0 | 0.0% |

Canada Census Mother Tongue - Val-des-Sources, Quebec
| Census | Total | French | | | English | | | French & English | | | Other | | |
| Year | Responses | Count | Trend | Pop % | Count | Trend | Pop % | Count | Trend | Pop % | Count | Trend | Pop % |
| 2021 | 6,920 | 6,650 | ▲2.2% | 96.1% | 140 | ▲55.6% | 2.0% | 60 | ▲20.0% | 0.9% | 55 | ▲22.2% | 0.8% |
| 2016 | 6,695 | 6,505 | ▼4.0% | 97.2% | 90 | ▼21.7% | 1.3% | 40 | 0.0% | 0.6% | 45 | ▲80.0% | 0.7% |
| 2011 | 6,955 | 6,775 | ▲4.9% | 97.4% | 115 | ▲43.8% | 1.7% | 40 | ▲60.0% | 0.6% | 25 | ▼73.7% | 0.4% |
| 2006 | 6,660 | 6,460 | ▲2.1% | 97.0% | 80 | ▼11.1% | 1.2% | 25 | ▲150.0% | 0.4% | 95 | ▲850.0% | 1.4% |
| 2001 | 6,435 | 6,325 | ▲5.8% | 98.3% | 90 | ▲5.9% | 1.4% | 10 | ▲ n/a% | 0.2% | 10 | ▼66.7% | 0.2% |
| 1996 | 6,095 | 5,980 | n/a | 98.1% | 85 | n/a | 1.4% | 0 | n/a | 0.0% | 30 | n/a | 0.5% |

== Economy ==
=== Transportation ===
The two most important roads entering Val-des-Sources are Road 249, connecting Val-des Sources to Magog, via Sherbrooke and Road 255 connecting Baie-du-Febvre to Bury while passing through Val-des-Sources and Saint-Cyrille-de-Wendover.

== Attractions ==
Close to downtown Val-des-Sources, outdoor enthusiasts can take advantage of the Trois Lacs resort, the golf club or the cycle path. Also, the Festival des Gourmands is the main festive event in the city. Music is a big part of the city thanks to the Harmonie d'Asbestos, an institution long recognized throughout the region during the years 1945-60 and the Camp musical d'Asbestos, which welcomes young musicians from all over Quebec.

== Government ==
In the 2025 municipal elections, Hugues Grimard was reelected unopposed as mayor of Val-des-Sources. Grimard was initially elected in 2009, defeating the incumbent mayor Jean-Philippe Bachand with 52% of the votes. Bachand tried unsuccessfully to unseat Grimard and regain his former seat in the 2013 election but Grimard was re-elected with 60% of the votes. In the 2017 elections, Bachand finally return to city council by winning a seat as a councillor but he was unseated in 2021 when Isabelle Forcier won his councillor seat with 60% of the votes.

Current Government

Mayor: Hugues Grimard

Councillors:

1. Isabelle Forcier
2. Danielle Désautels
3. René Lachance
4. Caroline Prayer
5. Mario Savoie
6. Pierre Benoit

== Notable people ==
- Jennie Carignan
- Pierre-Philippe Côté
- Jayson Dénommée
- Jean Hamel
- Denis Patry
- Julie Lemieux
- Sean McKenna
- Gilles Hamel

== See also ==
- Asbestos
- List of cities in Quebec
- Asbest, similarly named town in Sverdlovsk Oblast, Russia
- Chrysotile
