= The Northern Miner (Canada) =

Canadian newspaper

- Founded: March 30, 1915
- Headquarters: Toronto
- Website: www.northernminer.com

The Northern Miner is a weekly trade journal (formerly part of the Hollinger group) that reports on the mining industry. The Northern Miner began publication in Cobalt, Ontario, Canada, in 1915, and has since moved publication to Toronto.

The weekly journal is considered to be the "leading authority on the mining industry in Canada", and " the mining industry's bible".
