= Stripping ratio =

In surface mining, stripping ratio or strip ratio refers to the amount of waste (or overburden) that must be removed to release a given ore quantity. It is a number or ratio that expresses how much waste is mined per unit of ore. The units of a stripping ratio can vary between mine types. For example, in coal mining the stripping ratio is commonly referred to as volume/weight., whereas in metal mining, stripping ratio is unitless and is expressed as weight/weight. A stripping ratio can be expressed as a ratio or as a number.

== Equations ==
The equations for stripping ratio are,

for coal:

$$\frac{Overburden (volume)}{Coal (weight)}$$

for metal:

$$\frac{Waste (weight)}{Ore (weight)}$$

where volume is typically expressed as m^{3} or yd^{3} and weight is typically expressed as tonne or ton.

== Use ==
It is common for the stripping ratio to be used as an indicator of economic value for an open pit mine. This is because removal of waste is a cost to the mine whereas mining ore leads to revenue. A stripping ratio is commonly used as a quick method to evaluate a mine’s or a design’s value. High stripping ratios are not desired because they are indicating that large amounts of waste must be moved to access ore.

== See also ==
- Open-pit mining
