= Abitibi gold belt =

Region of Canada that extends from Wawa, Ontario to Val-d'Or, Quebec

Coordinates: 48.30°N 80.80°W

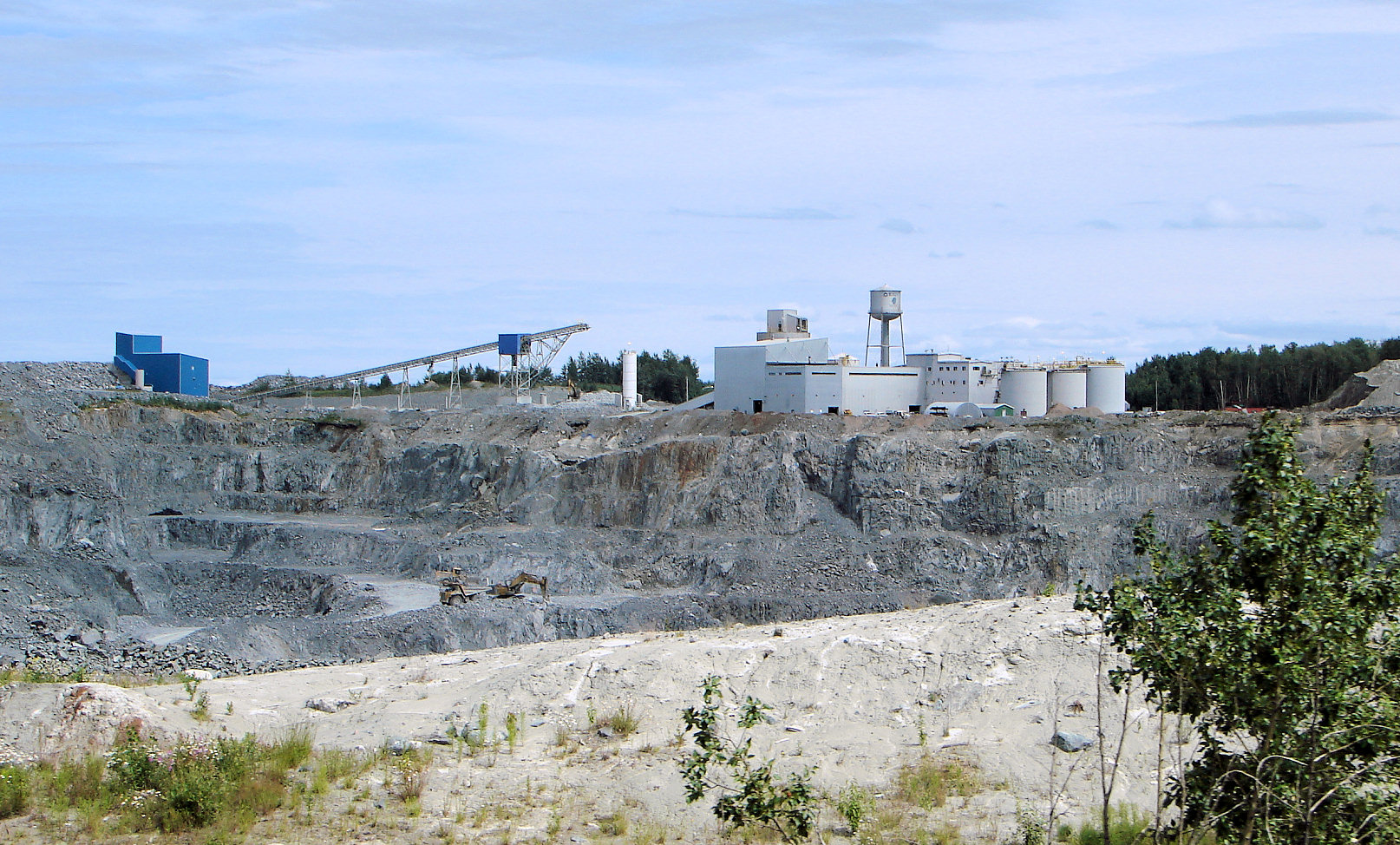
Open pit mine in Val-d'Or, Quebec

The Abitibi gold belt is a region of Canada that extends from Wawa, Ontario to Val-d'Or, Quebec. Located within the mineral-rich Abitibi greenstone belt, the gold belt is an established gold mining district having produced over 100 mines, and 170 million ounces of gold since 1901. Timmins, a town founded in 1912 following the Porcupine Gold Rush and subsequent creation of the Hollinger Mines, McIntyre Mines and Dome Mine, which was one area in the region that experienced a gold rush, beginning in 1909. The Kerr Addison Mine in Virginiatown was at one time Canada's largest gold producing mine. Many of the towns readily acknowledge gold mining as part of their history, some being named after gold (Val d'Or means 'valley of gold', Kirkland Lake's nickname is 'the mile of gold'). One of Canada's 'large roadside attractions' is a 12-foot replica of a 1908 gold sovereign (nominally, one pound sterling) built to commemorate Canada's first gold coin which was made using gold from the Kerr Addison owned Kerr-Addison mine.

Mining in the region experienced a resurgence between 2000 and 2010 when two companies, Osisko Mining and Detour Gold began investing heavily in two areas, Malartic and Detour Lake; low production costs have helped bring more attention back to the area. Malartic (which began commercial production in June 2011) will contribute about $3.25 billion to the region's economy over 20 years and Detour Lake about $1.0 billion. The four mines that historically comprised the Malartic property are Canadian Malartic, Barnat, Sladen and East Malartic. Gold mines in the Kirkland Lake area are still active, having contributed to the formation of Kirkland Lake Gold Inc. The Detour Lake gold project near Cochrane, Ontario is North America's fourth biggest undeveloped gold deposit; when it opens in 2013 it will produce at an annual rate of approximately 649,000 ounces for 16 years. Another $1.5 billion is being invested in Matachewan, Ontario where Northgate's 2.5 million ounce Young-Davidson gold mine is located.

The abitibi greenstone belt in which the gold belt is situated has produced over 35 billion pounds of zinc, 15 billion pounds of copper, and 400 million ounces of silver, most of which was mined in and around Timmins, Ontario. The Greenstone Belt is part of a larger granite-greenstone-gneiss terrain called the Abitibi subprovince, part of the Archean Superior Province.

== Mines in the region by historic production ==
Producer	Timmins	Kirkland Lake	Rouyn-Noranda	Val-d'Or	Cadillac	Virginia- town	Malartic	Duparquet	Holloway	Matat- chewan
Thousands of oz	64,000	24,000	15,000	15,000	12,000	11,000	8,000	1,000	1,000	1,000

== Gold mining companies with interests in the area ==
- Armistice Resources - Recently purchased and actively drilling Kerr Addison property. Pre-production activity on adjacent property to west. (See also listing below for Kerr Mines Inc.)
- Atlanta Gold Inc. - Canadian company whose main property is in Atlanta, Idaho. All other projects are in Quebec, including Abitibi mines Normar, Mouskor, and Malartic H acquired in 2008.
- Barrick Gold - Owns the Bousquet Mine in Northwest Quebec. Mined in East Malartic in 2002.
- Britannica Resource Corp. - TSX Venture Exchange listed exploration company that runs the McKenzie Break and Destor-Porcupine Blake River projects in Quebec.
- Century Mining - Lamaque mine in Val d'Or, Quebec.
- Clifton Star Resources - Owns the Duparquet gold project in Quebec (since June 2011 when Osisko walked away from its 50% share). The Duparquet mine produced 1 million ounces of gold between 1931 and 1957 when it was managed by Beattie Gold.
- Durango Resources Inc - TSX Venture Exchange listed exploration company with 14,000 hectares in the Windfall Lake Gold Camp area.
- Harte Gold Corp. - nano cap company founded in 1982 that explores primarily on the Ontario side of the belt.
- Kerr Mines Inc.- name changed from Armistice Resources Corp on 9 January 2014.
- Kinross Gold - Operated in the Kirkland Lake area but sold a lot of its interest later on to Kirkland Lake Gold Inc.
- Kirkland Lake Gold - Virginiatown, Kirkland Lake. Detour Lake gold project.
- Lake Shore Gold - Operates the Timmins, Thunder Creek, other TW properties, Bell Creek mill, Bell Creek complex, Blakelock, Casa Berardi, Tipahaakaanin gold projects in Quebec and Ontario. There are also projects in Mexico.
- Moneta Porcupine Mines Inc. TSX: ME - Gold explorer that operates east and west of Timmins, Ontario (where it is based). Exploration is centered around the township of Michaud, Ontario (Destor porcupine fault, Golden Highway which has 10 distinct mining zones) with others located near the Quebec-Ontario border. Controlled by management and institutional investors.
- Northern Gold Mining - Exploration and development company operating along the Destor Porcupine Fault Zone, 40 km east Matheson, ON
- Northern Star Mining - Exploration properties in the areas comprising Cadillac, Bousquet, Malartic. Core operation is at a property known as Midway.
- Alamos Gold Inc. - owns 100% of the Young-Davidson mine in Matchewan, Ontario 60 km from Kirkland Lake.
- Matachewan Consolidated mine.
- Oban Mining Corporation - in 2015 and 2016 the company has been creating a portfolio of properties in the Abitibi belt, by takeover bids to other exploration and development companies. The flagship property is the Windfall Lake Gold Deposit, in the Urban-Barry Greenstone Belt of the Abitibi sub-province of the Superior Province.
- Osisko Mining - Malartic, Quebec (100% owned) and Atikokan, Ontario (Duparquet 50% interest was abandoned in 2011).
- Agnico Eagle - Currently holds the largest land package in the Kirkland Lake area.
- Titan Resources - Cooper Gold property near Val d'Or, Quebec. Based in Oklahoma.
- Warrior Gold Inc. - Currently explores the Goodfish Kirana Project - 6 km north of the town of Kirkland Lake.
- Wesdome Gold Mines Ltd. - A multi-asset gold producer operating Eagle River Mine in Wawa, Ontario and Kiena Mine in Val-d'Or, Quebec.

== See also ==
- List of gold mines in Canada
