= Kurtis McLean =

Canadian professional ice hockey centre (born 1980)

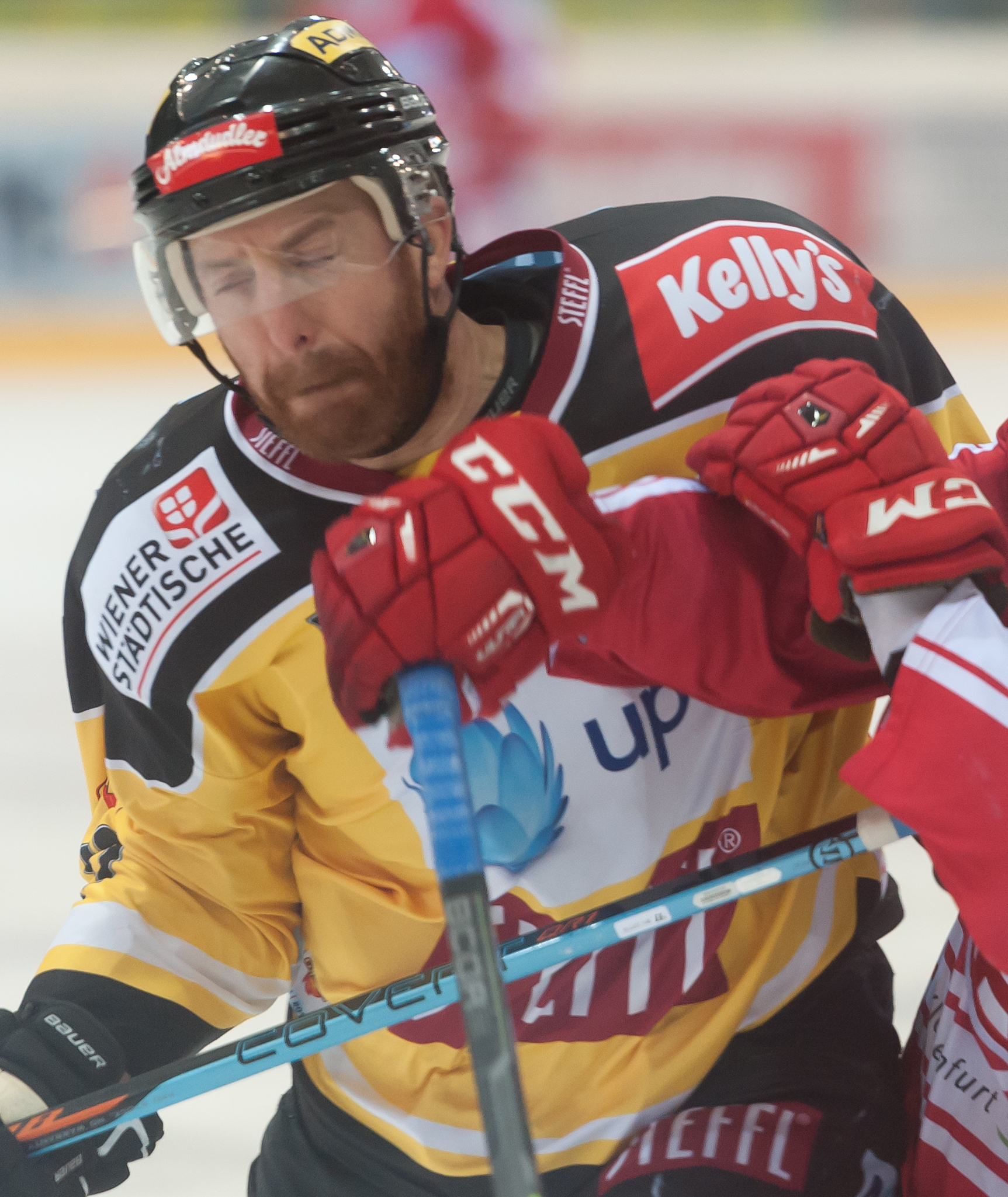
- McLean with the Vienna Capitals in 2016
- Born: November 2, 1980 (age 44); Kirkland Lake, Ontario, Canada
- Height: 6 ft 0 in (183 cm)
- Weight: 190 lb (86 kg; 13 st 8 lb)
- Position: Centre
- Shot: Right
- Played for: New York Islanders; Wilkes-Barre/Scranton Penguins; Bridgeport Sound Tigers; Wheeling Nailers; Richmond RiverDogs; Lukko; SCL Tigers; Metallurg Novokuznetsk; Jokerit; KHL Medveščak Zagreb; Vienna Capitals; EHC Wolfsburg; Graz 99ers HC 07 Detva; HSC Csíkszereda; Kiekko-Espoo
- NHL draft: Undrafted
- Playing career: 2005–2022

Kurtis McLean (born November 2, 1980) is a Canadian ice hockey coach and former player. He currently serves as assistant coach for Kiekko-Espoo in the Finnish Mestis.

== Early life ==
McLean grew up in the small northern Ontario town of Kirkland Lake and played Midget AAA hockey for the New Liskeard Cubs. He also had a short stint with his hometown team, the Kirkland Lake Legion 87's. He attended Kirkland Lake's Collegiate and Vocational Institute.

== Career ==
Undrafted by the Ontario Hockey League after the 1996–97 season, McLean moved to the Trenton Sting of the Ontario Provincial Junior A Hockey League where he played three seasons. His exploits in Tier II Jr. hockey earned him a spot on the Norwich University (NCAA-III) roster the following year and became the first player in NCAA-III history to be named a first team all-American four years in a row.

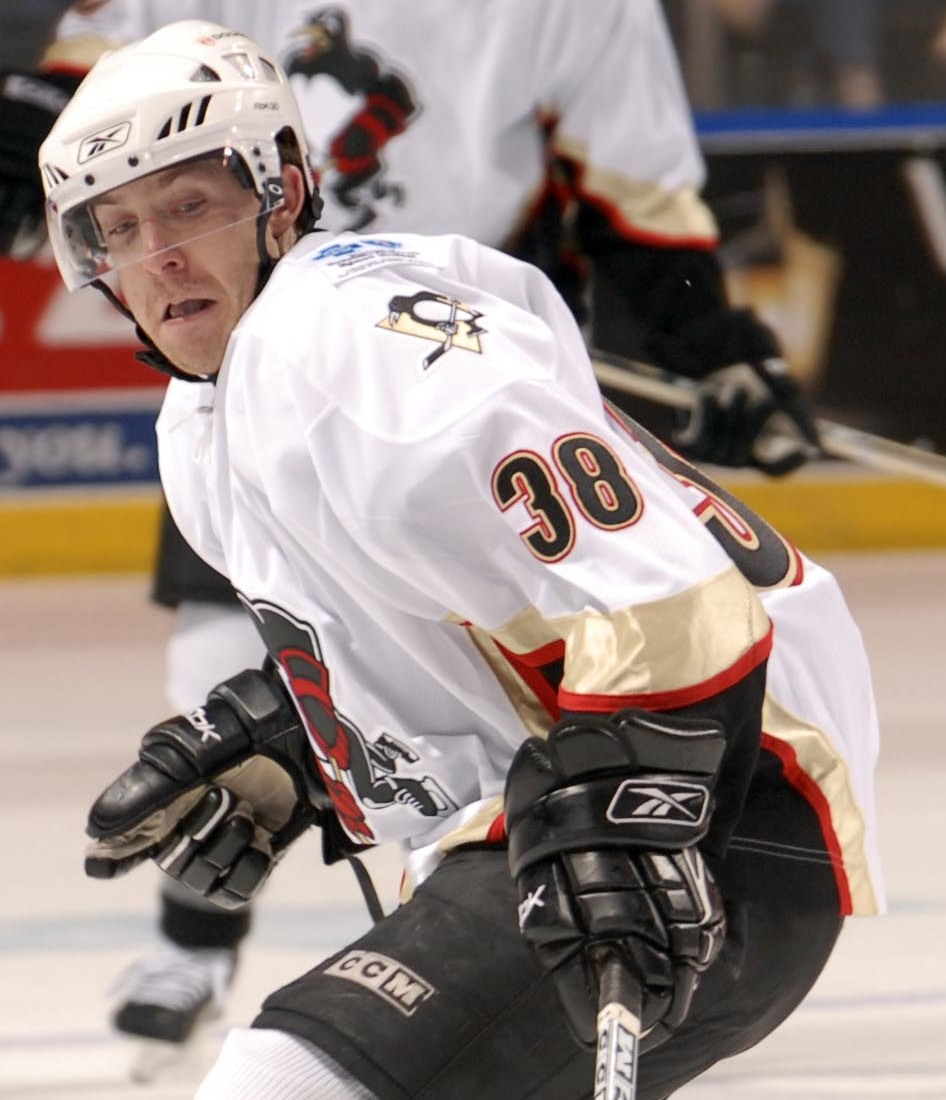
McLean with the Wilkes-Barre/Scranton Penguins in 2006

After his four seasons at Norwich, McLean signed as an undrafted free-agent with the Pittsburgh Penguins in 2005. Called up to the Wilkes-Barre/Scranton Penguins from the Wheeling Nailers during the 2005–06 season, he played 32 games and finished second in total points with 54; third in goals scored with 22; and with a plus/minus of +14. He helped the Penguins win the Eastern Conference Championship and finished third on the team in playoff scoring with 19 points (4 goals and 15 assists).

On July 3, 2008, McLean signed with the New York Islanders. He was called up to the Islanders on January 19, 2009, and scored his first NHL goal, in his second NHL game, against Jean-Sebastien Giguere in a 2–1 win over the Anaheim Ducks on January 21, 2009.

On January 23, 2009, McLean was inducted into Hockey Heritage North. Town mayor Bill Enouy said of McLean, "They will never be able to take that off his resume. No matter what happens in the future, he will always be a guy that played in the NHL".

On May 29, 2009, McLean signed a contract with Finnish club Lukko of the SM-liiga. He stayed for two seasons and captained the team during the 2010–11 season. McLean then moved to Switzerland's Nationalliga A and spent two seasons with the SCL Tigers where he led the team in points both seasons.

On May 22, 2013, Mclean signed for Lukko, signalling a return to Finland, but a month later he departed and instead signed a one-year contract with Metallurg Novokuznetsk of the Kontinental Hockey League. In the 2014–15 season, McLean continued to play in the KHL, splitting the year between Finnish club, Jokerit, and Croatian club, KHL Medveščak Zagreb.

McLean signed a one-year contract with the Vienna Capitals of the EBEL as a free agent on July 31, 2015. He left the Capitals during the season and signed a contract for the remainder of the 2015–16 season with EHC Wolfsburg of the German top flight Deutsche Eishockey Liga on February 16, 2016.

On August 30, 2016, McLean joined the Graz 99ers of the EBEL.

== Career statistics ==
			Regular season					Playoffs
Season	Team	League	GP	G	A	Pts	PIM	GP	G	A	Pts	PIM
2000–01	Trenton Sting	OPJHL	47	37	38	75	16	—	—	—	—	—
2001–02	Norwich University	ECAC	32	28	24	52	12	—	—	—	—	—
2002–03	Norwich University	ECAC	29	25	23	48	26	—	—	—	—	—
2003–04	Norwich University	ECAC	28	36	21	57	16	—	—	—	—	—
2004–05	Norwich University	ECAC	26	29	26	55	6	—	—	—	—	—
2004–05	Richmond Riverdogs	UHL	4	1	2	3	2	—	—	—	—	—
2005–06	Wheeling Nailers	ECHL	41	31	25	56	32	5	4	4	8	4
2005–06	Wilkes-Barre/Scranton Penguins	AHL	32	4	11	15	8	7	0	0	0	4
2006–07	Wheeling Nailers	ECHL	16	11	12	23	21	—	—	—	—	—
2006–07	Wilkes-Barre/Scranton Penguins	AHL	55	16	16	32	24	10	4	3	7	4
2007–08	Wilkes-Barre/Scranton Penguins	AHL	76	22	32	54	58	23	4	15	19	8
2008–09	Bridgeport Sound Tigers	AHL	62	15	37	52	30	—	—	—	—	—
2008–09	New York Islanders	NHL	4	1	0	1	0	—	—	—	—	—
2009–10	Lukko	SM-l	42	18	25	43	28	4	0	1	1	10
2010–11	Lukko	SM-l	60	16	39	55	24	13	4	6	10	4
2011–12	SCL Tigers	NLA	49	14	28	42	34	4	3	2	5	2
2012–13	SCL Tigers	NLA	46	7	34	41	26	17	4	9	13	20
2013–14	Metallurg Novokuznetsk	KHL	47	9	13	22	26	—	—	—	—	—
2014–15	Jokerit	KHL	20	1	0	1	18	—	—	—	—	—
2014–15	KHL Medveščak Zagreb	KHL	11	2	3	5	6	—	—	—	—	—
2015–16	Vienna Capitals	EBEL	39	10	17	27	18	—	—	—	—	—
2015–16	Grizzlys Wolfsburg	DEL	5	2	3	5	2	15	1	4	5	6
2016–17	Graz 99ers	EBEL	54	17	33	50	20	5	0	2	2	6
2017–18	Graz 99ers	EBEL	47	6	19	25	37	—	—	—	—	—
2018–19	TUTO Hockey	Mestis	10	1	2	3	2	—	—	—	—	—
2018–19	HC 07 Detva	Slovak	7	1	1	2	2	9	1	2	3	6
2019–20	HSC Csíkszereda	Erste	34	4	20	24	51	—	—	—	—	—
2020–21	Kiekko-Espoo	Mestis	31	9	16	25	26	2	0	1	1	2
NHL totals			4	1	0	1	0	—	—	—	—	—
