= Detour Lake Mine =

Gold mine in Ontario, Canada

- Location in Canada
- Location: Ontario, Canada; 50°1′8.75″N 79°42′54.08″W
- Products: Gold
- Opened: 1983
- Company: Kirkland Lake Gold
- Website: Kirkland Lake Gold - Detour Gold
- Acquired: 2019

The Detour Lake mine property contains the mineral rights to a large area, approximately 235 km^{2} (91 sq mi), in northeastern Ontario, near the Quebec border, approximately 185 km (115 mi) northeast of Cochrane, Ontario, or 260 km (160 mi) northeast of Timmins, Ontario. In 1979, rights-holder Amoco Canada Petroleum agreed with Dome Mines and Campbell Red Lake Mines Ltd. (which would both merge in 1987 with Placer Development Ltd. to form Placer Dome) to explore and develop the mineral resources. In 2019, Detour Gold – the former operating company of the mine – was acquired by Kirkland Lake Gold.

After exploration and feasibility studies, by 1982, they estimated that a mine could be constructed at a cost of $143 million, consisting of an open pit for the first four years before transitioning to an underground mine to access a higher concentrations area at lower costs. The project included the construction of an 180 km (110 mi) all-weather road from Cochrane and a 45 megawatt transmission line, though they were mostly funded by the province.

By the time of the mine's opening in November 1983, they had an estimated reserve of 3.5 million ounces of gold with an expected mine lifespan of 22 years, and an expected additional cost of $110-million for the underground and mill expansion. However, gold prices had peaked in 1980 and, combined with actual concentrations of gold being lower than calculated, resulted in lower than anticipated returns. The decision was made in 1997 to begin closing the mine. By the time it had ceased operation in 1999 the mine had produced 1.8 million ounces of gold.

Pelangio Mines Inc. purchased the mine in 1998 for $2.3 million while it was in the process of being decommissioned and subsequently maintained it as an exploration property. A substantial exploration program increased the proven and probable reserve from 4.8 million ounces in 2007 to 16.9 million in 2016. However, the gold only existed in low grade concentrations, necessitating Open-pit mining that could process large quantities of rock. Like the first mine, it used a cyanidation and carbon in pulp processing facility. The new mine opened in 2013 and produced between 500,000 and 600,000 ounces each year through 2019 when it was acquired by Kirkland Lake Gold.

Several worker safety incidents occurred at the mine. In June 2015, a 52-year-old worker was killed from cyanide poisoning via skin absorption while repairing a leak. Detour Gold was charged with 14 violations of the Occupational Health and Safety Act but they were dropped in favour of Detour Gold pleading guilty to criminal negligence causing death and paying $2.6 million in fines, including $800,000 to the spouse of the worker. There was a second poisoning incident in August 2017 but the worker survived. Another worker was critically injured when the dump truck he was driving in heavy fog rolled over the side of a haulage road to the tailings pond. Nevertheless, production proceeded with Detour Gold recovering 505,558 ounces of gold in 2015, followed by 537,765 ounces in 2016 571,463 ounces in 2017, 621,128 ounces in 2018, and 601,566 ounces in 2019.

== See also ==
- Abitibi gold belt
- List of gold mines in Canada
- Work accident
