= Patrice Desbiens =

Francophone Canadian poet (born 1948)

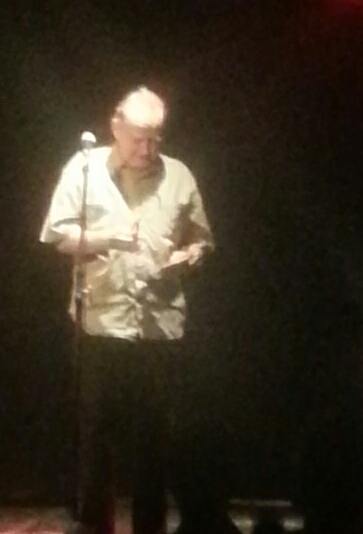
- Patrice Desbiens in Montréal, Canada
- Born: 1948 (age 77–78); Timmins, Ontario, Canada
- Education: Timmins High and Vocational School

Patrice Desbiens (born 1948) is a Francophone Canadian poet. He began his career as a journalist. Since making his literary debut in 1972, he has been regarded as one of Canada's most successful French-language poets. He is associated with the founding of the publishing house Éditions Prise de parole and the Théâtre du Nouvel-Ontario in Sudbury, Ontario.

== Early life and education ==
Desbiens was born in Timmins in 1948. He completed some high school education at Collège du Sacré-Cœur de Timmins and Timmins High and Vocational School. After a teacher recognized his talent for poetry, Desbiens moved to Greater Sudbury to pursue poetry as a career.

== Career ==
Desbiens began his career as a journalist. During the early 1970s, he worked for French-language weekly newspaper L'Express, then later worked with various literary journals. During this time, he also published his first poems with Les Éditions Prise.

Desbiens has received multiple awards for his poetry. In 1985, he received the Prix du Nouvel-Ontario and was a finalist for the Governor General's Award for French-language poetry for his book Dans l'après-midi cardiaque. In 1996, he won the Prix Champlain for Un pépin de pomme sur un poêle à bois. Two years later, he won the Prix de poésie Terrasses Saint-Sulpice-Estuaire for La Fissure de la fiction and was nominated for the Prix Félix-Antoine-Savard de poésie. In 2008, he won the Prix du Salon du livre du Grand Sudbury.

In addition to poetry, Desbiens is a jazz percussionist. With René Lussier, he has produced two albums: Patrice Desbiens – Les Moyens du Bord (1999) and grosse guitare rouge (2004).

== Personal life ==
Desbien moved to Quebec City in 1988, then resettled in Montreal three years later. As of 2016, he continued to live in Montreal.

== Selected works ==
- 1974 : Ici, Editions à Mitaine,
- 1977 : Les conséquences de la vie, Prise de parole,
- 1979 : L'Espace qui reste, Prise de parole,
- 1981 : L'Homme invisible, Prise de parole,
- 1983 : Sudbury textes 1981–1983, Prise de parole,
- 1985 : Dans l'après-midi cardiaque, Prise de parole, Finaliste du Prix du Gouverneur général,
- 1987 : Les cascadeurs de l'amour, Prise de Parole,
- 1988 : Poèmes anglais Prise de parole,
- 1988 : Amour ambulance, Écrits des forges,
- 1995 : Un pépin de pomme sur un poêle à bois, Prise de parole, Prix Champlain,
- 1997 : L'effet de la pluie poussée par le vent sur les bâtiments, Docteur Sax,
- 1997 : La fissure de la fiction, Prise de Parole, Prix de poésie des Terrasses Saint-Sulpice,
- 1999 : Rouleaux de printemps, Prise de parole,
- 2001 : Bleu comme un feu, Prise de parole,
- 2002 : Hennissements, Prise de parole,
- 2004 : Grosse guitare rouge, livre cd avec René Lussier, Prise de parole,
- 2005 : Désâmé, Prise de parole,
- 2007 : En temps et lieux, L'Oie de Cravan,
- 2008 : Homme invisible (L') / The Invisible Man suivi de Les cascadeurs de l'amour, Prise de parole,
- 2008 : Décalage, Prise de parole,
- 2008 : En temps et lieux 2, L'Oie de Cravan,
- 2009 : En temps et lieux 3, L'Oie de Cravan,
- 2011 : Pour de vrai, L'Oie de Cravan.
- 2013 : Les abats du jour, L'Oie de Cravan.
- 2013 : Sudbury poèmes 1979–1985, BCF poésie, Prise de parole
