= Kirkland Lake Gold =

Canadian gold mining company

Kirkland Lake Gold Inc.
- Type: Public
- Traded as: TSX: KL; NYSE: KL
- Industry: Mining
- Founded: July 27, 1988
- Founders: Brian Hinchcliffe and Harry Dobson
- Fate: Merged with Agnico Eagle Mines Limited
- Headquarters: Toronto, Ontario, Canada
- Key people: Brian Hinchcliffe, CEO (2001-13), George Ogilvie, CEO (2013-16), Anthony Makuch, CEO (2016-22)
- Products: Gold
- Website: klgold.com

Kirkland Lake Gold Inc. was a Canadian gold mining company based in Toronto. It owned and operated several gold mines in Canada and Australia before its merger into Agnico Eagle in 2021.

== History ==
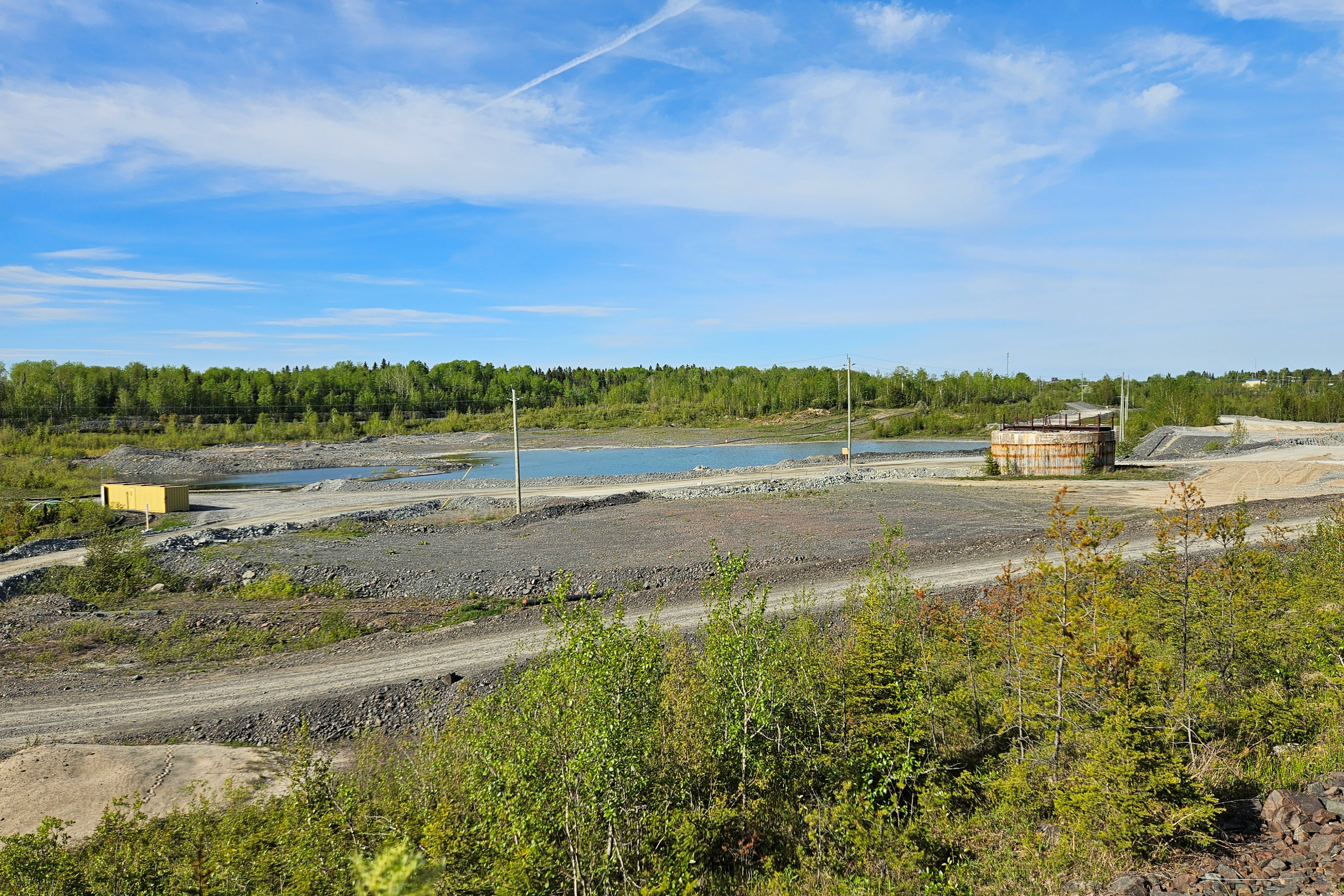
Former Lake Shore Mine site

The company was founded in 1988 as Goldpac Investments. Between 1994 and 1999, it operated as Brimstone Gold Corp., a consulting and investment company in the gold mining industry. The company was renamed Foxpoint Resources Ltd. as it sought to acquire and develop its own gold mining property.

In 2001, the Vancouver-based Foxpoint Resources purchased several mining properties from Kinross Gold around Kirkland Lake, Ontario. The $5 million purchase included several former mines: Macassa Mine, Lakeshore Mine, Wright Hargreaves and Teck Hughes. The company renamed itself again as Kirkland Lake Gold and re-commissioned the underground Macassa Mine. As it continued new exploration, it was able to begin extracting gold from the mine in 2003.

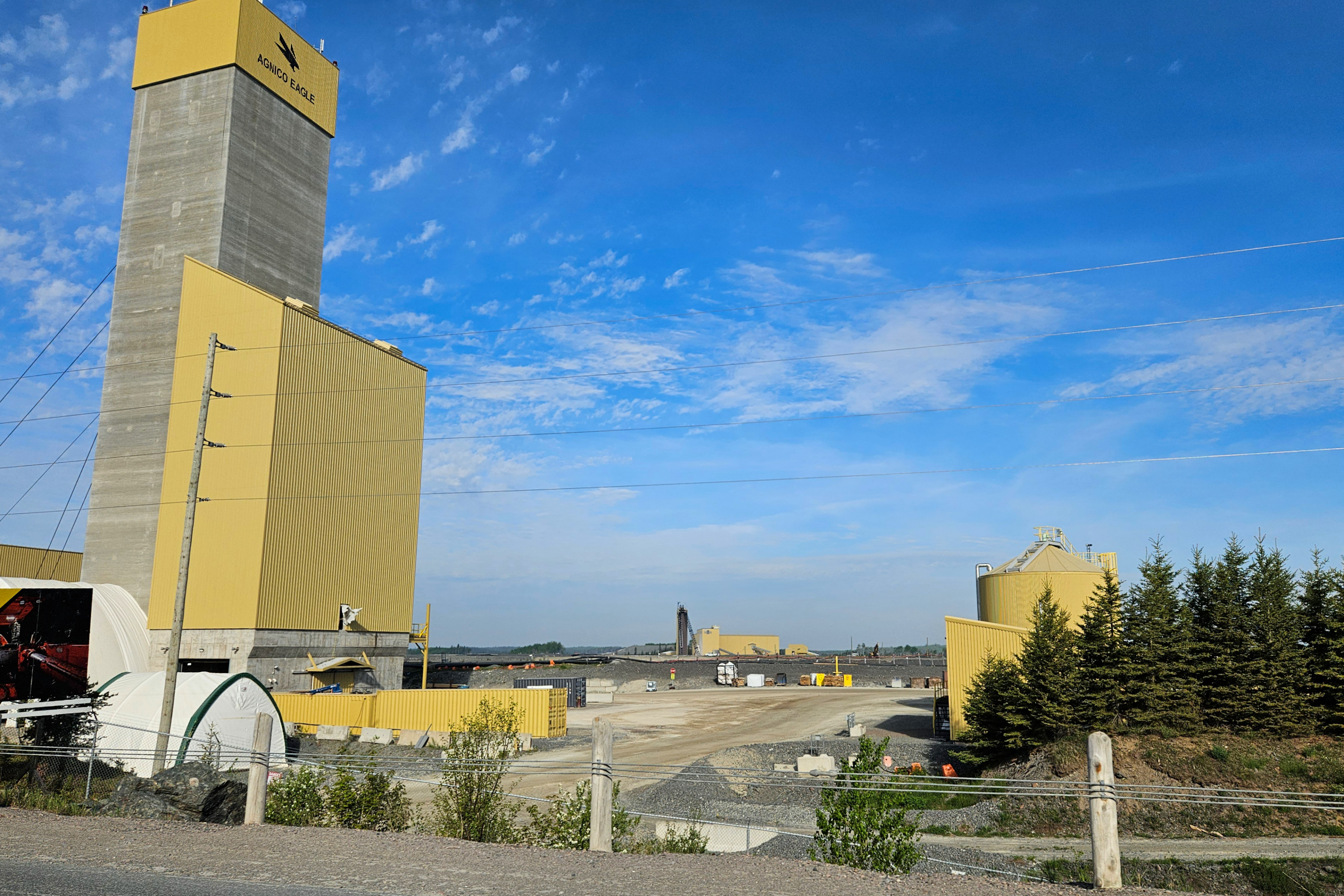
Macassa Mine

Kirkland Lake Gold focused on developing its Macassa mine until 2015 when it acquired St. Andrew Goldfields with its three mines (the Holt Complex) about 100 km from Kirkland Lake, in an all-stock deal worth $178 million.

In 2016, pressure from activist shareholders seeking more aggressive expansion led to changes in management to expand the company's holdings. Later that year, the company acquired Vancouver-based Newmarket Gold Inc., which owned the Cosmo mine in the Northern Territory and the Fosterville and Stawell Gold Mines in Victoria, Australia, for $1.01-billion in stock. Kirkland Lake Gold listed stocks on the Australian Securities Exchange effective November 30, 2017.

On the Toronto Stock Exchange, Kirkland Lake Gold was promoted to the S&P/TSX 60 index effective September 23, 2019. Within a few months, the company acquired Detour Gold in a $4.9-billion purchase.

In February 2022, Kirkland Lake Gold merged with Agnico Eagle Mines Limited in an all-stock deal with Kirkland's stocks being delisted.

=== Carbon footprint ===
Kirkland Lake Gold's Total CO2e emissions (Direct + Indirect) (in kilotonnes)
| Dec 2018 | Dec 2019 | Dec 2020 |
|---|---|---|
| 512 | 595 | 438 |

== See also ==
- Largest gold companies
- Abitibi gold belt
