= Blanche River Health Kirkland Lake site =

- Blanche River Health
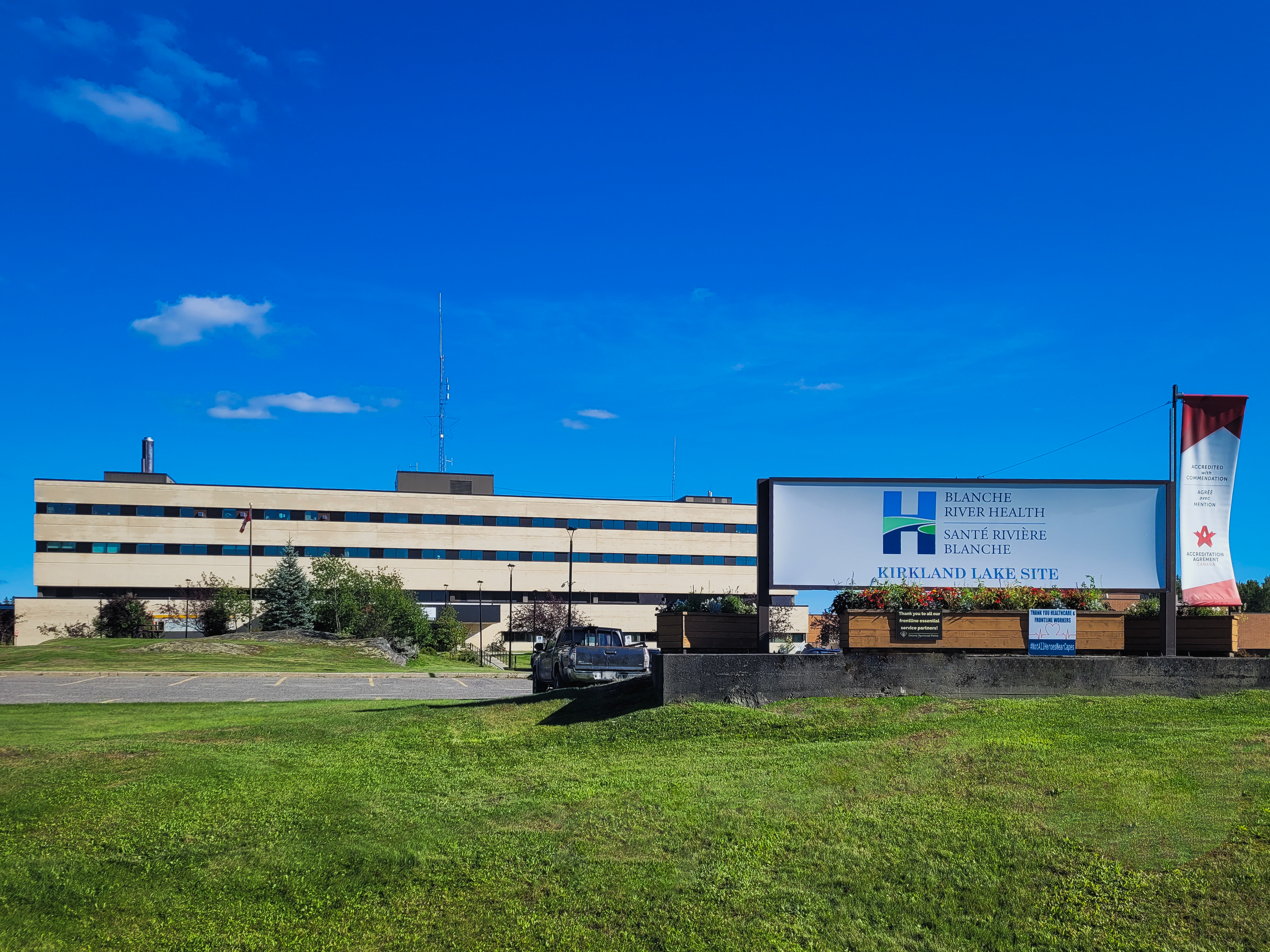
- The hospital in August 2022

Geography
- Location: Kirkland Lake, Ontario, Canada
- Coordinates: 48.1534°N 80.0153°W

Organization
- Care system: Public Medicare (Canada)
- Type: Community
- Network: NORTH Network

Services
- Emergency department: Yes
- Beds: 62 (6 intensive care, 2 obstetrics, 39 medical/surgical and 15 chronic)

History
- Former names: Kirkland and District Hospital
- Founded: October 15, 1976

Links
- Website: blancheriverhealth.ca
- Lists: Hospitals in Canada

The Blanche River Health Kirkland Lake site is a public hospital that serves Kirkland Lake, Ontario, Canada and the surrounding area. Originally established in 1975 as the Kirkland and District Hospital, it adopted its current name after amalgamating with the Englehart and District Hospital to form the new Blanche River Health hospital corporation.

The hospital has a total of 62 beds, including 6 intensive care, 2 obstetrics, 39 medical/surgical and 15 chronic beds plus 280 full-time and part-time staff. Departmental laboratories include haematology, chemistry, blood bank and cryogenics sections and referred out microbiology, cytology and pathology services as well as diagnostic services including echocardiography, pulmonary function testing, exercise stress testing, radiography, mammography, ultrasound, doppler facilities and fetal monitoring capabilities.

Blanche River Health is part of the NORTH Network, a telemedicine network affiliated with Lady Minto Hospital in Cochrane, Timmins and District Hospital and the Sunnybrook Health Sciences Centre in Toronto.

== History ==
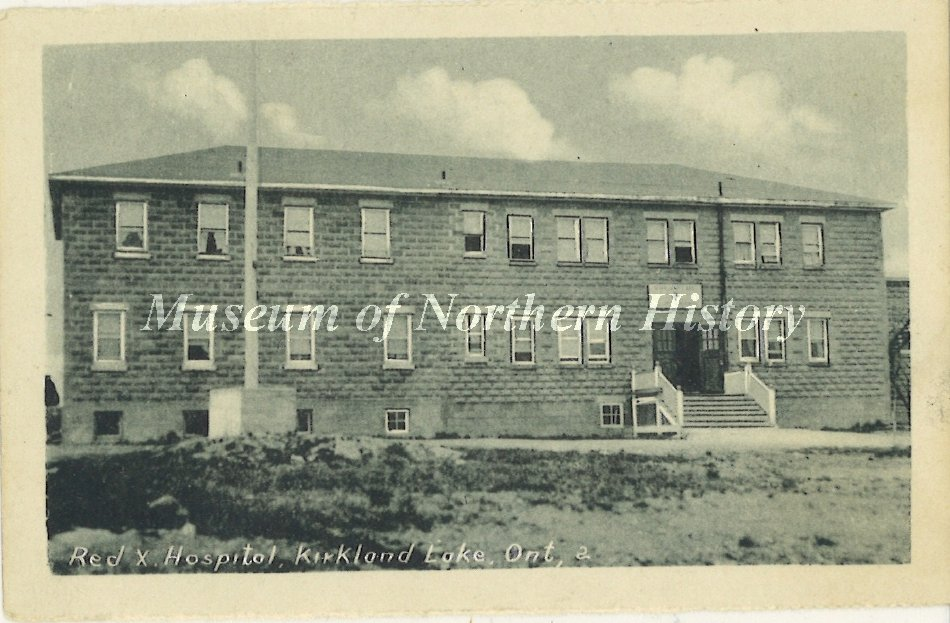
Image of Red Cross Hospital, Kirkland Lake, ON, loaned from the Museum of Northern History

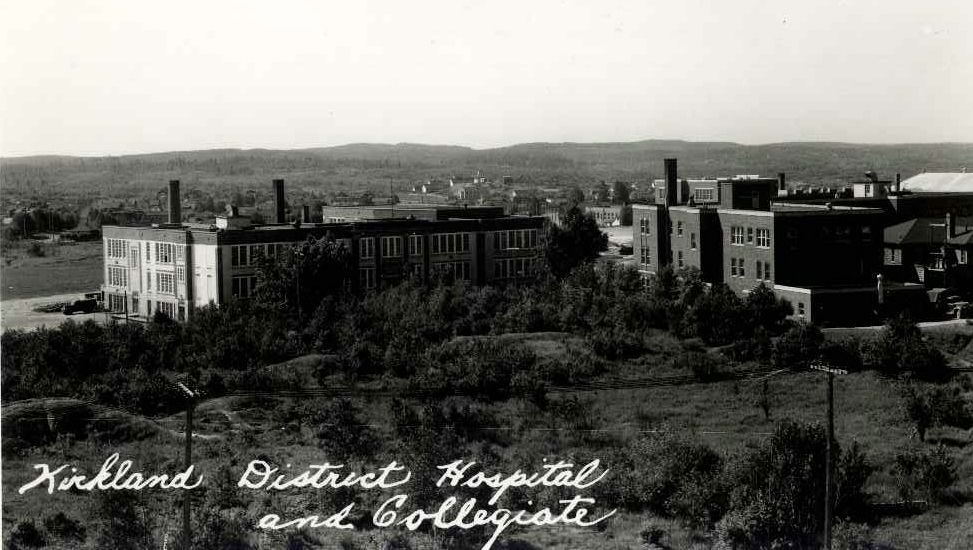
Old Kirkland & District Hospital, across from the Collegiate & Vocational Institute, loaned from Museum of Northern History Collection

The first hospital opened in Kirkland Lake was the Kirkland Lake Red Cross Hospital, in 1926. Subsequently, the old Kirkland & District Hospital was built sometime around the 1940s on 2nd Street, across from the Kirkland Lake Collegiate & Vocational Institute. The hospital was partially financed by the prospector William Henry "Bill" Wright, who donated money to build the east wing of the hospital which bore his name.

The current hospital was opened October 15, 1975, by Orval L. Archer (one of the former presidents of the hospital board). The hospital was originally equipped with 132 beds, but downsized to the present 62 beds. In October 2020, the Kirkland & District Hospital amalgamated with the Englehart & District Hospital, under the Blanche River Health system.

The Kirkland site is associated with several Ontario colleges and universities, including the Northern Ontario School of Medicine (NOSM), The University of Toronto School of Medicine, Nipissing University, College Boreal (DI), Northern College.
