= District School Board Ontario North East =

School board in Ontario, Canada

Location
- Schumacher, Ontario Hearst, Kapuskasing, Smooth Rock Falls, Cochrane, Iroquois Falls, Timmins, Schumacher, South Porcupine, Matheson, Kirkland Lake, Elk Lake, Englehart, Thornloe, New Liskeard, Temagami Canada
- Coordinates: 48.4748°N 81.2887°W

District information
- Chair of the board: Bob Brush
- Director of education: Lesleigh Dye
- Schools: 23 elementary 9 secondary 1 alternate education
- Budget: CA$120.6 million (2016-2017)
- District ID: B28002

Students and staff
- Students: 4361 elementary students 2989 secondary students 7350 students total
- Staff: 963.57 permanent employees

Other information
- Elected trustees: 11
- Website: www.dsb1.ca

District School Board Ontario North East (DSB1; DSB Ontario North East; known as English-language Public District School Board No. 1 prior to 1999) is an Ontario English public school board serving Northeastern Ontario from Hearst to Temagami. It covers an extensive area of 25,000 square kilometres. The corporate office is located in Schumacher at 153 Croatia Avenue and a secondary office is located in New Liskeard at 198022 River Road.

The school board offers English, French Immersion and Alternate Education programming, including the Early Learning Kindergarten Program with full-day junior and senior kindergarten programs in every elementary school since 2000. The board also has a strong online learning community through e-Learning Ontario of the Ontario Ministry of Education.

== Schools ==
District School Board Ontario North East operates 32 schools (23 elementary, 9 secondary, 1 alternate education).

=== Elementary ===
- Bertha Shaw Public School, South Porcupine
- Central Public School, Kirkland Lake
- Clayton Brown Public School, Hearst
- Cochrane Public School, Cochrane
- Diamond Jubilee Public School, Kapuskasing
- Elk Lake Public School, Elk Lake
- Englehart Public School, Englehart
- Federal Public School, Kirkland Lake
- Golden Avenue Public School, South Porcupine
- Iroquois Falls Public School, Iroquois Falls
- Joseph H. Kennedy Public School, Matheson
- Kerns Public School, Kerns
- Kirkland Lake District Composite School, Kirkland Lake
- New Liskeard Public School, New Liskeard
- Pinecrest Public School, Timmins
- R. Ross Beattie Senior Public School, Timmins
- Roland Michener Intermediate School, South Porcupine
- Schumacher Public School, Schumacher
- Smooth Rock Falls Public School, Smooth Rock Falls
- Temagami Public School, Temagami
- Timmins Centennial Public School, Timmins
- W. Earle Miller Public School, Timmins

=== Secondary ===
- École Secondaire Cochrane High School, Cochrane
- Englehart High School, Englehart
- Hearst High School, Hearst
- Iroquois Falls Secondary School, Iroquois Falls
- Kapuskasing District High School, Kapuskasing
- Kirkland Lake District Composite School, Kirland Lake
- Roland Michener Secondary School, South Porcupine
- Timiskaming District Secondary School, New Liskeard
- Timmins High & Vocational School, Timmins

=== Alternate education ===
- P.A.C.E. Centre, Timmins

== Administration ==
Name	Position
Lesleigh Dye	Director of Education
Lisa Edwards	Superintendent of Business/Finance and Treasurer
Steve Pladzyk	Superintendent of Education - Central
Al McLean	Superintendent of Education - North
Chad Mowbray	Superintendent of Education - South

== Trustees ==
These are the elected trustees, serving a 4-year mandate ending on November 30, 2026.

Trustee	Area Served
Steve Meunier (Chair)	Timmins
Cindy Pye-Reasbeck (Vice-Chair)	Hearst, Kapuskasing
Howard Archibald	Indigenous Trustee
Douglas Walsh	Temiskaming Shores, Temagami, Elk Lake and area
Larry Wiwchar	Temiskaming Shores, Temagami, Elk Lake and area
Jonathan Byer	Englehart
Crystal Hewey	Timmins and Area
Rosemary Pochopsky	Kirkland Lake
Brian Peever	Iroquois Falls, Black River, and Matheson
Doug Shearer	Temiskaming Shores, Temagami, Elk Lake and area
Bob Brush	Timmins and Area
Dennis Draves	Cochrane

== See also ==
- List of school districts in Ontario
- List of high schools in Ontario
