= Kirkland Lake Miners' Memorial =

Memorial in Kirkland Lake, Ontario, dedicated to the city's mining labourers

Coordinates: 48°08′50″N 80°02′55″W

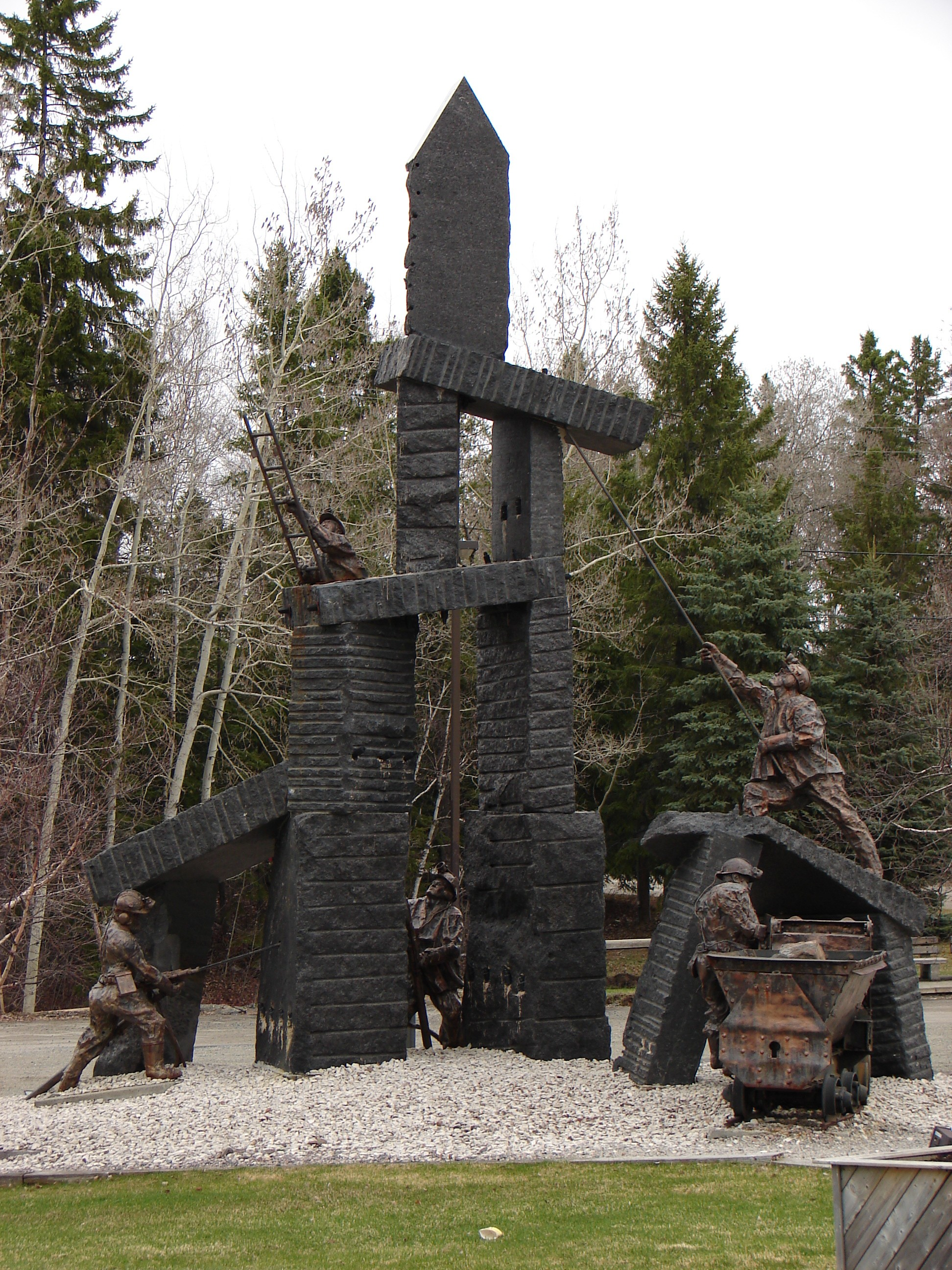
The Miners Monument in Kirkland Lake, Ontario.

The Kirkland Lake Miners' Memorial is a memorial in Kirkland Lake, Ontario, dedicated to the city's mining labourers.

During the 1930s the town's seven great gold mines (Macassa, Tough-Oaks, Kirkland Lake Gold, Lakeshore, Wright-Hargreaves, Teck-Hughes and Sylvanite) provided one million dollars to the province's economy and employed 4,640 workers. However, now only a few mines remain, with Mcdermott mine, Hollaway, and Macassa mine is still open and in order to honour all miners, living and dead, the local Miners’ Memorial Foundation constructed the 40-tonne, 10-meter-tall (33 ft) Miners’ Memorial.

== Background of this grassroots project ==
The Miners' Memorial Foundation was chaired by Steven Yee, a local miner and president of the United Steel Workers – District 6 Union. ^{2,3} The committee was largely made up of local miners and their mission was to create a monument in order to make sure that there was a place so that the miners who built their town could be remembered. After ten years of hard work the Miners' Memorial project culminated on July 25, 1994, when the monument was completed and donated to the town of Kirkland Lake during its 75th anniversary celebration. The ceremony was attended by hundreds of local people ^{3}.

With regards to fundraising, this project was largely a 'grass roots' effort that relied upon community bingos and Nevadas. The federal and provincial governments also made important contributions as did a Rita MacNeil benefit. Even the artists who designed the monument, Rob Moir and Sally Lawrence, were local. Further, once all of the components of the Monument were created, they were assembled by miners who volunteered their spare time to see their project completed.

== The Monument: Physical Structure ==
Overall Appearance This "40-tonne 10-meter-high black granite abstraction of a head frame" ^{2} is a monument in every sense of the word. Its black granite stone and bronzed figures speak to the timelessness of the miner, while the lawn and picnic tables in the park surrounding it facilitate the meeting of the past and present. This speaks to the manner in which the monument encourages remembrance and reconciliation with the past in order to provide a basis upon which the community's future can be forged.

Physical Components of the Monument

Every physical component of the Monument is local. Even the rock was taken from the nearby French River. All of the machinery and equipment was donated by miners or the mines. ^{2} The mucker, the ladder and even the batteries on the miner's belts are authentic. Further, even the bolts that are used to hold the Monument together are stone bolts taken from a mine. ^{3} It was important that everything was local and authentic because the Miners’ Monument Foundation wanted the Monument to show as accurately as possible what it was like to work underground and to make the monument as ‘human’ and ‘warm’ as possible. ^{2}The monument was not supposed to be a cold monolith embodying only the danger of underground work, and it is instead a memorial infused with the miners’ experiences.

The Figures

The emphasis upon facilitating a ‘warm’ and ‘human’ message in the Monument is why the bronzed miner figures were made in the likeness of real miners. This also serves to remind us that even though the miners did hard underground work, they were still human beings. ^{2,3} The position and actions of the figures also carry with them significant messages. For example, the figure climbing the ladder speaks to the need for the community to continue to move forward, and to climb the proverbial ladder of Health and Safety. It is thus simultaneously a celebration of how far Health and Safety has come, a reminder of the need to continue to improve Health and Safety and a remembrance for those who died in the mines.^{1}

== Cultural Framing ==
Part of the significance of this Monument stems from how it is framed by the 'cultural landscape’ surrounding it. Historians Sherry Lee Linkton and John Russo explain that "one way of thinking about a landscape is to view it as a representation, a text that can be read, much like a novel or a painting"^{5} and when this type of analysis is applied to the landscape around the Monument it demonstrates how the cultural landscape adds to its meaning in three important ways. ^{5}

Firstly, the space occupied by the Monument is the former site of a bridge that was an important navigational and cultural landmark.^{3} Local people used to take pictures of the bridge and everybody knew what you were taking about when you mentioned 'the bridge.' However, the bridge was torn down after it became a safety hazard, leaving a spatial vacuum of cultural significance that the Miners’ Memorial now occupies. ^{3}

Secondly, the Monument was constructed on the former property of Harry Oakes, one of the town's most influential mine owners and a man who was Canada's largest tax payer during the 1930s.^{3,4} As an historical figure, Oakes is central in many of the town's histories and was the founder of Lakeshore Mine.'^{6} That the Monument stands upon Oakes’ property is important because it helps brings memories of the town's miners and the mine owners together to present a more complete local history.

Thirdly, standing at the town's periphery, the Monument is seen by all who enter it. This is important since part of the Monument's purpose was to act as a symbol of identity for the town, specifically to show anyone who enters the town that they are entering a mining town. ^{3,8}

== Community Importance ==
In addition to the historical, cultural and identity roles of the Monument outlined above, it carries further significance to the community. A few of these are:

-The Monument inspired Bernie Jaworsky to write Lamps Forever Lit: A Memorial To Kirkland Lake Area Miners. After Mr. Jaworsky saw the list of the miners’ names he wanted to 'get their stories’ as well. He thus set out collecting stories and photographs from the families, especially the widows, of the miners’ which he consolidated into his memorial-book.^{2}

-The Monument's scaler figure is featured on the cover of Karl Beveridge and Jude Johnston's Marking Our Mark. The fact that of the 13 monuments and murals featured in their book it was Kirkland Lake's Miners’ Memorial that they chose to represent their book.

-The figure working the mucker was featured in commemorative mining stamp produced by the Canada Post^{3}

-The Monument and its park are currently host to community picnics and seasonal caroling. Thus it is a site of celebration as well as for remembering a difficult past. ^{1}

-It is featured in many textual discussions about the town, such as Bob Cowen's monograph and the flyer for Lamps^{7,9}
