= Timmins High and Vocational School =

Location
- 451 Theriault Boulevard; Timmins, Ontario, P4B 8B2; Canada; 48°29′08″N 81°20′57″W

Information
- School type: Public, high school
- Motto: Latin: Sapientia Omnia Vincit (Wisdom Conquers All)
- Established: 1923
- School board: District School Board Ontario North East
- School number: 948578
- Principal: Tim Swartz
- Grades: 9 to 12
- Enrollment: 600 (2019/2020)
- Language: English
- Colours: Blue and white
- Mascot: Lion
- Team name: Blues
- Website: thvs.dsb1.ca

Timmins High and Vocational School (TH&VS) is an English-language public secondary school in Timmins, Ontario, Canada, part of the District School Board Ontario North East.

Country music star Shania Twain attended Timmins High and Vocational School, graduating in 1983.

== See also ==
- Education in Ontario
- List of secondary schools in Ontario
