= Kirkland Lake District Composite School =

Location
- 60 Allen Avenue; Kirkland Lake, Ontario, P2N 3J5; Canada; 48.14853°N 80.02159°W

Information
- School type: Elementary and Secondary School
- Motto: Integrity, Skill, Excellence
- Founded: 2006
- School board: District School Board Ontario North East
- Area trustee: Rosemary Pochopsky
- School number: 296600 (Elementary); 920363 (Secondary)
- Administrator: Tyler Deighton
- Principal: Terry McMillan
- Grades: 7-12
- Enrollment: Elementary: 120; Secondary: 575
- Language: English
- Area: Kirkland Lake
- Colours: Maroon and White
- Mascot: Spike the Devil
- Team name: Devils
- Website: kldcs.dsb1.ca

Kirkland Lake District Composite School (commonly known as KLDCS), is a public elementary and secondary school located in Kirkland Lake, Ontario, Canada. It was established in 2006 to replace the building that housed both Kirkland Lake Collegiate and Vocational Institute and École secondaire catholique Jean Vanier.

== See also ==
- Education in Ontario
- List of secondary schools in Ontario
