= Fosterville Gold Mine =

Gold mine in Victoria, Australia

- Location within Victoria
- Location: Fosterville, Victoria, Australia; 36.711°S 144.502°E
- Products: Gold
- Discovered: 1894
- Opened: 2003 (modern)
- Active: 1894–1903 (historic); 1988–2001 (heap leaching)
- Company: Agnico Eagle Mines Limited
- Website: www.agnicoeagle.com/English/operations/operations/Fosterville-Gold-Mine/default.aspx

Fosterville Gold Mine is a gold mine east of Bendigo in the Australian state of Victoria. As of 2025, it was the largest gold mine in Victoria.

The current mine was established by Newmarket Gold. Newmarket was taken over by Kirkland Lake Gold in 2016, and in turn that merged with Agnico Eagle Mines Limited in 2022.

Gold was first discovered in the Fosterville area in 1894 and mined from then until 1903. Mining operations restarted in 1989 with open pit heap leach operations initially operated by New Brunswick NL. Following the shortfall of the production forecast then mine was sold to Perseverance Gold Corporation who had heap leach oxide gold expertise from their open pit operation at Nagambie. Perseverance successfully operated the Fosterville gold mine as a series of open pit mines with heap leach processing until 2003 when the oxide ore became exhausted. The company changed management and became focused on establishing sulphide gold resources. They established sufficient resources to re-begin mining in 2005 and warrant the installation of a flotation-BACOX-CIL plant and mining continued from some of the 13 open pit operations. Upon the exhaustion of the open pit sulphide resources, the mine schedule was aimed at transitioning to an underground operation. The transition failed and the mine was closed and placed on the open market. Northgate Minerals Corporation bought the mine and operated the underground mine successfully. The mine changed hands through Crocodile Gold, AuRico, Newmarket prior to the purchase by Kirkland Lake Gold. Commercial sulphide production from open pits was achieved in 2005 and underground mining commenced in 2006. In 2018, it was estimated to have at least six more years of operation. Agnico Gold purchased the gold mine from Kirkland Lake Gold.
