= Frank Melong =

Canadian ice hockey player

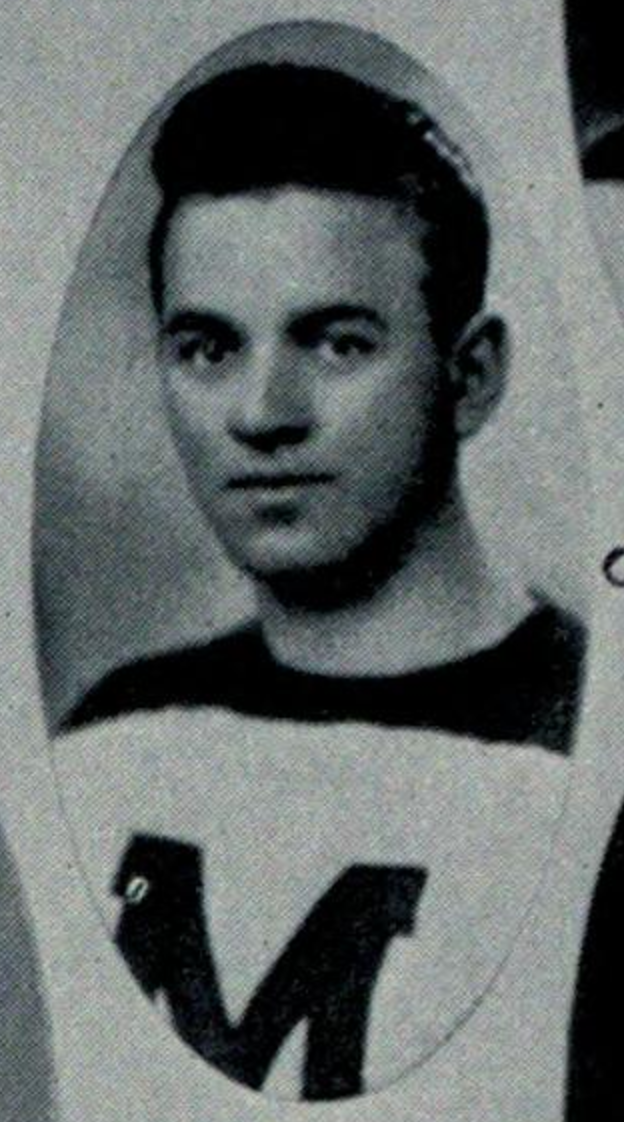
- Melong pictured at St. Michael's College, c. 1944
- Born: September 15, 1925 Kirkland Lake, Ontario
- Died: August 19, 1967 (aged 41)
- Height: 6 ft 0 in (183 cm)
- Weight: 195 lb (88 kg; 13 st 13 lb)
- Position: Defense
- Played for: Indianapolis Capitals; New Haven Eagles; St. Louis Flyers; Houston Huskies; Omaha Knights
- Playing career: 1941–1957

Frank Melong (September 15, 1925 – August 19, 1967) was a Canadian professional hockey player who played for the Indianapolis Capitals, New Haven Eagles, St. Louis Flyers, Houston Huskies, and Omaha Knights in the American Hockey League and United States Hockey League.
