= Detour Gold =

Detour Gold Corporation
- Company type: Public; TSX:DGC; OTCX:DRGDF
- Industry: Gold mining
- Founded: August 22, 2006
- Defunct: January 7, 2020
- Fate: Acquired by Kirkland Lake Gold
- Headquarters: Toronto, Ontario, Canada
- Key people: Gerald Panneton, CEO (2006-13), Paul Martin, CEO (2013-18), Michael Kenyon, CEO (2018), Mick McMullen, CEO (2019-20)
- Products: Gold
- Website: www.detourgold.com

Detour Gold Corporation is a former Canadian gold mining company, between 2006 and 2020, that owned and operated the Detour Lake Mine in the Abitibi gold belt of northeastern Ontario. Located northeast of Timmins and Cochrane, Ontario, near the Quebec border, the mine was operated by Placer Dome between 1983 and 1999, recovering 1.8 million ounces of gold in that time, and maintained as an exploration property by Pelangio Mines Inc. until 2006 when a group of investors formed the Detour Gold Corporation to develop a new mine. An initial public offering on the Toronto Stock Exchange on January 31, 2007, as well as several subsequent offerings, raised sufficient funds to develop the mine, so that it began production in 2013. Its low grade concentrations necessitated an open pit mine with cyanidation and carbon in pulp processing. Between 2014 and 2019 the mine produced between 500,000 and 600,000 ounces of gold each year. In 2020, following a proxy fight with activist shareholder Paulson & Co., the mine and the company were acquired by Kirkland Lake Gold in an all-stock purchase totaling $4.9 billion.

== History ==
The Detour Gold Corporation was founded in an asset purchase agreement announced on August 21, 2006, by a group of investors and mining experts led by Gerald Panneton. With the assistance of Vancouver-based mining management company Hunter Dickinson Incorporated, Detour Gold Corporation was created as a new company to own and develop the Detour Lake mining property. Pelangio Mines Inc. was given $5 million from the investors plus half of the shares issued during the new company's initial public offering (IPO), estimated at the time to be a total compensation of $65 million, though it was raised to $70 million as the 40 million IPO shares were adjusted from $3 to $3.50 before their release. The funds generated from the remaining 50% of the January 31, 2007, initial public offering was used to pay for further exploration of the property.

By December 2007 the initial results had increased the known reserves to 4.8 million ounces. Also, by that time, the share price had risen to $11.65. By February 2008 it had 7.8 million ounces of gold and a share price of $16.30. In 2009, with 13.2 million ounces discovered, they issued 4 million more shares at $12.10 each, for a total of $48.4 million, in July, and then another 17.55 million shares at $14 in October to raise another $250 million to use in feasibility studies. At that point, it was believed they could profitably extract 560,000 ounces annually beginning in 2012 for 14 years in an open pit design. The company raised another $252-million in 2010 at $24 per share and entered into a $125 million to purchase new haul trucks and supporting equipment from Caterpillar Inc.-supplier Toromont Industries. In 2011, the company began construction, with Kiewit Corporation on a new 135 kilometer transmission line to bring electricity to the mine site. Detour and Kiewit would be later be fined $75,000 for environmental damage relating to the work on the transmission line, including violations such as dumping fill into water bodies and clearing land within the boundaries of Little Abitibi Provincial Park.

Detour Gold's successful exploration and feasibility program, which illustrated an open pit mine could be constructed at a cost of $1.2 billion to access 14.9 million ounces of gold over 21 years and be profitable at US$625/oz (at the time the commodity price was US$1,330/oz), caused the company to be targeted for acquisition by larger mining companies that could supply the expertise and funding for the construction and operation phases. However, CEO Gerald Panneton resisted and pursued environmental assessment approval and opened a new regional headquarters office in Cochrane. They raised C$428 million partly by issuing 12,500,000 more shares at a price of C$29.75 each in July 2011. A brief spike in late-August to early-September would be the peak in Detour Gold's share price, with a closing of $39.40 on September 9, 2011. Detour would, however, continue to have success, buying out Trade Wind Ventures from its 50% stake in the adjacent 'Block A' property allowing for more expansion opportunity, selling 284,000 flow-through common shares at $35.25 to raise $10 million, acquiring federal environmental assessment approval, increasing their proven and probable reserves to 15.6 million ounces, and raising $250 million by issuing new shares all by February 2012.

By late-2012 Detour Gold, as construction of the mine was proceeding, was experiencing financing problems. It had to issue another 4 million shares at $26.50 each, its eighth share issuance since its IPO totaling $1.626-billion of equity and maintain $500 million of convertible bonds. The company pour its first ceremonially gold bar in February 2013 and entered into commercial production in September. However, throughout 2013 gold prices and the companies share price plummeted; it was the worst performing stock on the S&P/TSX Composite Index in 2013. Already carrying $600-million in debt, they were forced into issuing another batch of share at only $8.75 per share in June to maintain liquidity. The share price bottomed out at $2.97 in late-November and CEO Gerald Panneton resigned, to be replaced by the company's Chief Financial Officer Paul Martin. They had produced 232,387 ounces of gold in 2013, below expectations but at higher-than-expected prices. The share price rebounded and they were able to sell another 16 million shares at $9.25 in February 2014 to raise $150-million.

Share prices peaked again over $30 throughout the summer of 2016, as gold prices began rising again and the company revised its reserves up to 16.9 million ounces and the mine's life expectancy up by three years. However, the share price plunged to under $20 in the fall as gold prices fell again and the mine's expansion plan was delayed as being too costly to pursue at that time. The company fended off an unsolicited mini-tender offer made by TRC Capital Corporation, in January 2017, seeking to purchase 5,000,000 common shares, or approximately 2.86 percent of the company's shares, at a price of CA$15.25 per share. Then, on April 30, 2018, after a disappointing corporate report the share price dropped to $11, losing 30% of its value in a single day. This led to Paul Martin resigning as CEO, being replaced by the chairman of the board of directors Michael Kenyon assuming the role of interim CEO, and activist shareholder Paulson & Co. to begin lobbying to replace the board of directors. Paulson & Co. wanted to sell Detour Gold to a larger gold companies but like his predecessors, Kenyon was opposed to selling. Barrick Gold did inquire but Detour Gold continued to resist. Both Detour Gold and Paulson & Co. filed complaints against each other with the Ontario Securities Commission for providing shareholders with false and misleading information. In the December shareholder meeting Paulson & Co.'s was successful in replacing five of the nine directors with their candidates and having Kenyon resign as CEO. Kenyon was replaced by board member Bill Williams as interim CEO until May 1 when Michael McMullen was hired. On November 25, Kirkland Lake Gold announced the intended takeover of Detour Gold. The terms of the deal were that Detour Gold shareholders would receive 0.4343 of a Kirkland Lake Gold share, which at the time was a 24% premium of the market price (with Detour Gold share prices at $22.61 and Kirkland Lake Gold at $52.38) and totaled approximately $4.9 billion. Despite apprehension of shareholders on both sides, both agreed to the deal in January 28, 2020 shareholder meetings. The proxy fight and takeover at Detour Gold were amongst a wave of such in the gold sector in that timeframe. Detour Gold's stock was delisted from the Toronto Stock Exchange on February 2, 2020.

== See also ==
- Largest gold companies
- Abitibi gold belt
- List of gold mines in Canada
