= Century Mining Corporation =

Canadian company

- Type: Public
- Founded: 2003
- Headquarters: Seattle, Canada

The Century Mining Corporation is a Canadian gold producer formed in 2003. The company has produced 9.4 million ounces of gold.

In 2012 the company entered insolvency.
