= Kirkland Lake =

- Town (single-tier)
- Town of Kirkland Lake
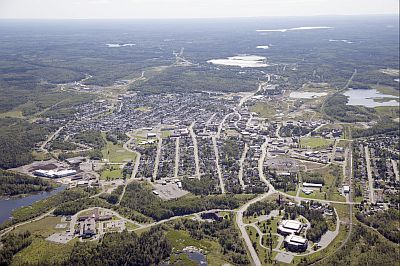
- Aerial view of Kirkland Lake

- Location within Ontario
- Coordinates: 48°09′00″N 80°02′00″W
- Country: Canada
- Province: Ontario
- District: Timiskaming
- Established: 1919 (Township of Teck)
- Incorporated: 1972 (Town)

Government
  - Mayor: Stacy Wight
  - Town Council: Councillors (as of 2022): Janice Ranger; Lad Shaba; Casey Owens; Dolly Dikens; Rick Owen; Patrick Kiely
  - MPs: Gaétan Malette (Conservative)
  - MPPs: John Vanthof (ONDP)

Area
  - Land: 261.29 km^{2} (100.88 sq mi)
  - Urban: 4.17 km^{2} (1.61 sq mi)
- Elevation: 243 m (797 ft)

Population (2021)
  - Total: 7,750
  - Density: 29.7/km^{2} (77/sq mi)
  - Urban: 6,180
  - Urban density: 1,480.7/km^{2} (3,835/sq mi)
- Time zone: UTC-5 (EST)
  - Summer (DST): UTC-4 (EDT)
- Postal code FSA: P2N
- Area code: 705
- Website: www.town.kirklandlake.on.ca

Kirkland Lake is a town and municipality in Timiskaming District of Northeastern Ontario, in the Canadian province of Ontario. The 2021 population, according to Statistics Canada, was 7,750.

The community name was based on a nearby lake which in turn was named after Winnifred Kirkland, a secretary of the Ontario Department of Mines in Toronto. The lake was named by surveyor Louis Rorke in 1907. Miss Kirkland never visited the town, and the lake that bore her name did not exist as it dried because of mine tailings, but due to floodings of the mineshafts it has recently come back up to about half of its initial depth. The community comprises Kirkland Lake (Teck Township), as well as Swastika, Chaput Hughes, Bernhardt, and Morrisette Township.

Kirkland Lake was built on gold mining, but is also notable for its hockey players. As well, hockey broadcaster Foster Hewitt called Kirkland Lake "the town that made the NHL." The town celebrated this via Hockey Heritage North, which was renamed Heritage North.

Until January 1, 1972, the town was known as Township of Teck. A by-law was introduced, on July 20, 1971, to change the municipality's name to Town of Kirkland Lake, effective January 1, 1972.

== History ==
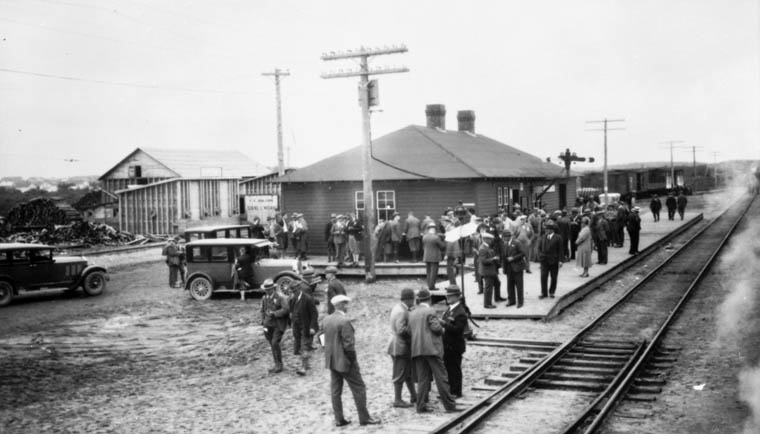
Temiskaming and Northern Ontario Railway station in Kirkland Lake, 1920

Gold in the Kirkland Lake region was originally reported in the late 1800s by Chief Ignace Tonené of the Temagami First Nation. In fact, he staked a claim near the north arm of Larder Lake but stated it was jumped (stolen). No action was taken on his report. Chief Tonene Lake was named in his honour. Chief Ignace Tonené would go on to help form Beaverhouse First Nation.

Later, Tom Price discovered a boulder containing gold on a visit to the Kirkland Lake area in 1906.

In 1911, important claims were made along the Main Break. John Hunton staked claims on February 18, 1911, which were incorporated as the Hunton Gold Mines Ltd. in April 1914, eventually becoming part of the Amalgamated Kirkland. Stephen Orr filed claims on February 22, 1911, the basis for the Teck-Hughes Mine and the Orr Gold Mines Ltd, which was incorporated in June 1913. George Minaker staked claims on February 23, 1911, part of which he sold to (Sir) Harry Oakes in September 1912, becoming part of the Lake Shore Mine. John Reamsbottom filed claims on April 18, 1911, which became part of the Teck-Hughes Mine.

It was at Teck-Hughes mine that miners and engineers developed Teck cable for sturdy electrical transmission. That type of cable is now used on electrical projects around the world.

C.A. McKane staked claims on April 20, 1911, which became the Kirkland Lake Gold Mine. A. Maracle staked claims on June 5, 1911, which became part of the Townsite claims. Melville McDougall staked claims on June 27, 1911, which he transferred to Oakes on September 6, 1912, and became the part of the Lake Shore Mine. Jack Matchett staked a claim on July 7, 1911, later acquired by Oakes, which became part of the Townsite Mine. On July 10, 1911, Dave Elliott staked claims which became the Macassa Mine. "Swift" Burnside staked claims on July 26–28, 1911, which became part of the Tough-Oakes Burnside Mine. Bill Wright filed claims on July 27–29, 1911, and on September 16, 1911, with his brother-in-law Ed. Hargreaves, which became part of the Sylvanite Mine. This claim extended into the lake's southeastern portion. More importantly, Wright found free gold near the future site of the Discovery Shaft. Ed. Horne staked a claim on October 12, 1911, which became part of the Townsite Mine, and the incorporation of Kirkland Townsite Gold Mines Ltd. in 1917. On January 8, 1912, Harry Oakes partnered with the Tough brothers plus Clem. Foster, who owned the Foster Silver Mine in Cobalt, staked claims which incorporated the No. 2 Vein and eventually led to the incorporation of Tough-Oakes Gold Mines Ltd. in 1913. Oakes filed additional claims on July 30, 1912, and Wright on August 26, 1912, both within the lake and eventually becoming parts of the Lake Shore Mine.

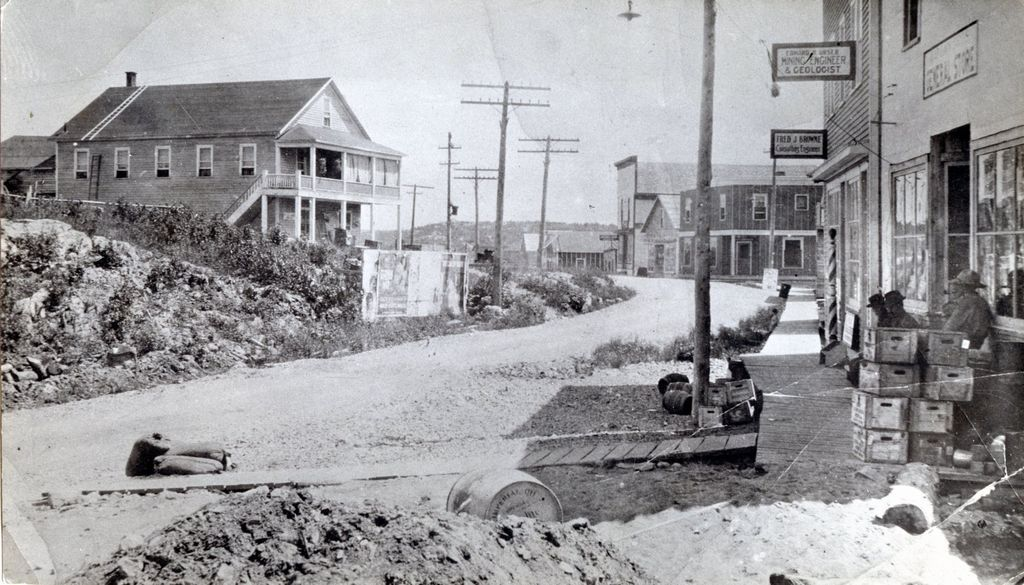
Government Road, c. 1920

By 1914, there was one mine in operation, the Tough-Oakes, which included electric power transmitted from Charlton. A settlement had formed at the southwest arm of the lake, which included a post office, stores and a hotel.

In order to maximize taxation revenue from existing and potential mines in the area, the six square mile Municipal Corporation of the Township of Teck was formed with Wellington J. McLeod as the first reeve in 1919. Their first task was the establishment of public utilities, including roads and water pipes, in the rapidly growing area.

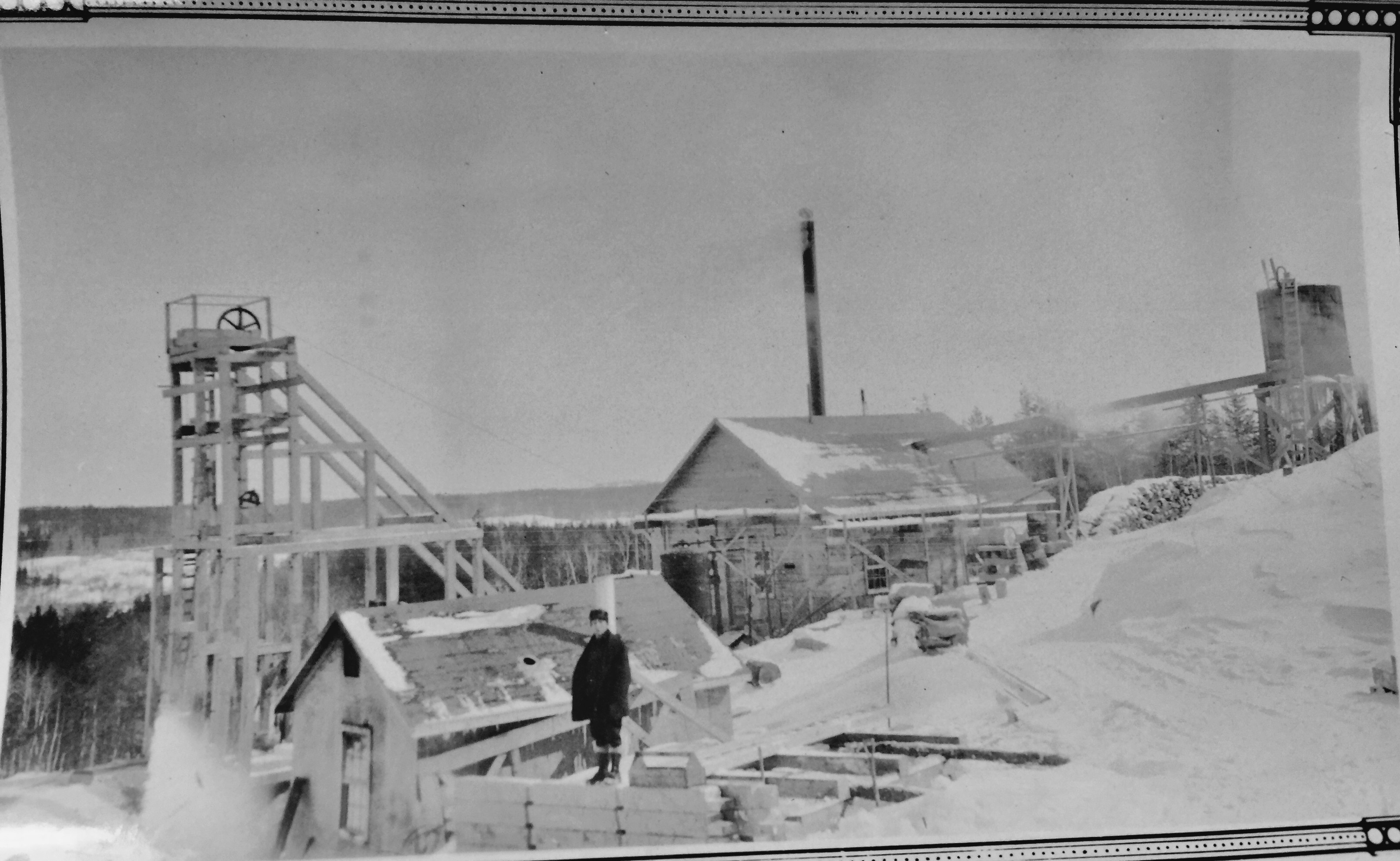
Wood Kirkland Gold Mine, Kirkland Lake, 1928

Kirkland Lake had numerous mines, in the early years, including the Teck-Hughes (1917–1968), Lake Shore (1918–1968), Kirkland Minerals (1919–1960), Wright-Hargreaves (1921–1965), Sylvanite (1927–1961), Tough-Oakes-Burnside (later Toburn) (1913–1953), and Macassa Mine (1933–1999).

The Kirkland Lake camp produced $636,667 worth of gold in 1918 and that rose to a value of $17,000,000 in 1930. As Pain points out, "Kirkland Lake camp came to occupy a position of real importance in the mining world." By 1934, the production had reached $34,000,000 and 2,000,000 tons were being milled annually. Peak employment of 4,761 wage earners occurred in 1939, but that dropped to 2,064 by 1944. The 1939 population was 24,200.

Early in the Second World War gold production in the area decreased due to personnel being lost to more essential war industries. In 1942, gold mining was declared a non-essential industry to the war effort which resulted in gold mines across the country being at a lower priority for personnel and supplies relative to producers of base metals. After the war, local soldiers returned to the newly created Federal area in the northern section of the town. The Kirkland Lake Cemetery is a member of the Commonwealth War Graves Commission and is the location of the graves of 12 soldiers, and 3 airmen of the Canadian forces who died during the Second World War.

Kirkland Lake's first fire hall was established in 1935 and the second fire hall in 1955.

In 1963 the open-pit Adams Mine began developing its iron ore resources. The mine would stay in production until 1990.

The Kirkland Lake Community Complex, now the Joe Mavrinac Community Complex, opened in 1979. Home of the Kirkland Lake Aquatic Club (KLAC) which has been the starting point for Dominique Bouchard - Olympic Swimmer, Rodney Thomas - Canada Games Double Gold medalist and numerous other university Varsity level scholarship swimmers.

In the early 1980s, LAC Minerals reopened the main shaft of the Lake Shore Mine and worked it from 1982 to 1987 to extract pockets of gold that had been left behind. Between 1987 and 1991 Vancouver based Eastmaque Gold Mines reprocessed tailings, or "slimes", from early inefficient mill operations, extracting 70,000 ounces of gold.

Between October and December 1988, Kirkland Lake was the filming location for the drama film Termini Station (1989).

On the morning of Sunday, May 20, 2012, a forest fire was discovered about 3 km (1.9 mi) north of Kirkland Lake, which grew to 2,757 ha (6,810 acres) by the afternoon of May 21, causing a state of emergency to be declared. Residential and cottage areas on Goodfish Lake and Nettie Lakes and one street in Chaput Hughes were evacuated that afternoon. Kirkland Lake Gold and AuRico Gold suspended operations due to fire damage to power lines and local schools were closed. On May 29, the state of emergency was lifted, as the fire was determined to be no longer a threat to Kirkland Lake, although it was not yet under control.

On December 18, 2012, the town council voted to have fluoride removed from the local water treatment facility, after a breakdown left the town with a bill of $360,000.

== Geography ==
Kirkland Lake includes the townships of Teck, Bernhardt and Morrisette.

Kirkland Lake is located in the resource-rich Precambrian Shield, an ancient geological core of the North American continent. Nearby is the Arctic Watershed, a drainage divide at an elevation of 318 m (1,043 ft). Rivers south of that elevation flow into a drainage basin which includes Lake Ontario and the Saint Lawrence River, while rivers north of the watershed flow into Hudson Bay.

Noticeable local landmarks include Mount Cheminis, rising 500 m (1,600 ft) above sea level, and many small kettle lakes, scraped out of the rock during the last Ice Age and filled with clear water.

Black spruce, jack pine, trembling aspen, white birch, white spruce, balsam poplar, and balsam fir are the dominant trees in the area. A prominent forest form in this part of the black spruce distribution is the black spruce/feathermoss climax forest, which characteristically exhibits moderately dense canopy and features a forest floor of feathermosses. Moose, beaver, muskrat, snowshoe hare, as well as numerous predators roam this area, including marten, ermine, fisher, otter, black bear, wolf, and lynx. The many wetlands and lakes support a diversity of bird species, such as great blue herons, ducks, geese, and that symbol of the north, the common loon. Ground and tree dwelling birds are also plentiful, including grouse, partridge, robins, blue jays, and Canada jays as well as birds of prey such as hawks.

=== Geology ===
Kirkland Lake is located within the Abitibi greenstone belt and the Abitibi gold belt. The main geologic feature in the Kirkland Lake Camp is the Kirkland Lake Break, or Main Break. This Break is a vein located along a thrust fault extending east to west and dipping steeply to the south. The area mine shafts are all located along this Break. Gold occurs in quartz veins in spatial relationship to this fault. The major mines in 1960, trending east to west, included Toburn, Sylvanite, Wright-Hargreaves, Lake Shore, Teck Hughes, Kirkland Minerals, and Macassa.

In the early days of staking claims, most prospectors tried to understand the lateral extent of this east–west trending vein defining the Main Break, as well as the associated veins paralleling it, e.g. South Vein, No. 2 Vein, No. 6 Vein, No. 7 Vein, etc. Most importantly, prospecting was extensive in the hopes the vein extended under the southern portion of Kirkland Lake.

Telluride minerals were present in the Tough-Oakes ore. They are also present in the Sylvanite Mine, though sylvanite is not one of them. The Sylvanite Mine started a 200-ton mill in 1927 and shafts reached 2,000 feet (610 m) by 1930.

Kirkland Lake Gold Mines Ltd. was incorporated in 1913 before the property was taken over by Cobalt's Beaver Consolidated Mines Ltd. after a shaft was sunk 80 feet (24 m). They formed the Kirkland Lake Gold Mining Company in 1915 and the main shaft was sunk 800 feet (240 m), which prompted the building on a mill in 1919. Shafts reached a depth of 1,600 feet (490 m) before the mine closed in 1924. Operations restarted in 1926 with new financing organized by Dr. J.B. Tyrrell, and high-grade ore was found at 2,475 feet (754 m). By 1930, the mine had reached a depth of 4,000 feet (1,200 m) and had acquired the Chaput-Highes claim to the south. The property was acquired by the Kirkland Minerals Corporation in 1956.

Tough-Oakes produced 213 tons of high-grade ore in 1914. Operations included a five-stamp mill for amalgamation plus a cyanide plant. However, the presence of high-grade ore in the vein terminated at the 300-foot (91 m) level and the mine shut down in 1918. This property was consolidated with Burnside's to form Tough-Oakes Burnside Gold Mines Ltd. in 1923 and the Burnside No. 3 shaft was deepened to 1,000 feet (300 m). The operation went bankrupt in 1928. Operations restarted as the Toburn in 1932, as a subsidiary of the American Smelting and Refining Company.

Lake Shore Mines Ltd. was incorporated in February 1914. Oakes proceeded with sending a crosscut from his shaft on the South Vein towards the anticipated Main Break under the lake to the north. This crosscut encountered high-grade ore and a 100-ton mill was in operation by March 1918. Their No. 1 shaft reached a depth of 1,600 feet (490 m) and their No. shaft a depth of 1,000 feet (300 m) by 1930 and was considered "the wonder mine" by Pain. There was 1,600 feet of high-grade ore at the 1,000-foot level and 2,400 feet (730 m) at the 2,400-foot level.

Wright-Hargreaves Mines Ltd. was incorporated in 1916. The Wright-Hargreaves Mine had a 100-ton a day mill operating by 1921 and shafts reached a depth of 2,000 feet (610 m) by 1930. Almost 900 feet (270 m) of high-grade ore was found between the 500-foot (150 m) level down to 1,750 feet (530 m).

In 1916, the Teck-Hughes Mine built a 50-ton cyanide mill after the No. 1 shaft reached a depth of 500 feet (150 m). In 1923, the company was reorganized as Teck-Highes Gold Mines Ltd, which included the Orr claim to the south. The central shaft reached a depth of 2,980 feet (910 m) and a south shaft was sunk in 1928 to reach a depth of 3,600 feet (1,100 m). A 1000-ton per day mill was in operation by 1930. High-grade ore of up to 1,000 feet (300 m) was found on six levels.

Macassa Mines Ltd. was organized in 1926, which included the Elliott claims. Mill operations started in 1933 and acquired the United Kirkland Gold Mines Ltd. claims to the south.

The lake itself was gradually filled in by mill tailings, such that the water had disappeared by 1930. By 1960, 1,500 miles (2,400 km) of underground workings were in the Kirkland Lake camp and 12 miles (19 km) of direct hoisting shafts. The Lake Shore and Wright-Hargreaves mines had the deepest working depths in the world, at 8,200 feet (2,500 m) below the surface.

=== Climate ===
Kirkland Lake enjoys four distinct seasons. Spring and autumn offer a mix of warm sunny days and crisp, cool nights. Summers are comfortably warm, with dry air and temperatures reaching into the mid-20-degree Celsius range (mid-70s Fahrenheit). Winter temperatures may seem brisk, but high winds and high humidity are rare, allowing residents to take full advantage of outside recreational activities.

Climate data for Kirkland Lake (1991–2020 normals, extremes 1950–present)
Month	Jan	Feb	Mar	Apr	May	Jun	Jul	Aug	Sep	Oct	Nov	Dec	Year
Record high °C (°F)	8.0 (46.4)	12.0 (53.6)	26.5 (79.7)	29.0 (84.2)	35.6 (96.1)	37.5 (99.5)	38.9 (102.0)	36.7 (98.1)	33.3 (91.9)	28.2 (82.8)	19.9 (67.8)	14.5 (58.1)	38.9 (102.0)
Mean daily maximum °C (°F)	−9.8 (14.4)	−7.6 (18.3)	−0.2 (31.6)	7.0 (44.6)	16.4 (61.5)	21.9 (71.4)	24.0 (75.2)	22.3 (72.1)	17.5 (63.5)	9.2 (48.6)	1.0 (33.8)	−6.1 (21.0)	8.0 (46.4)
Daily mean °C (°F)	−15.9 (3.4)	−14.5 (5.9)	−7.2 (19.0)	1.0 (33.8)	10.2 (50.4)	15.9 (60.6)	18.4 (65.1)	17.0 (62.6)	12.5 (54.5)	5.3 (41.5)	−2.6 (27.3)	−10.8 (12.6)	2.5 (36.5)
Mean daily minimum °C (°F)	−21.9 (−7.4)	−21.1 (−6.0)	−14.2 (6.4)	−5.0 (23.0)	4.0 (39.2)	10.0 (50.0)	12.8 (55.0)	11.7 (53.1)	7.4 (45.3)	1.4 (34.5)	−6.1 (21.0)	−15.5 (4.1)	−3.1 (26.4)
Record low °C (°F)	−47 (−53)	−43.5 (−46.3)	−41 (−42)	−28.9 (−20.0)	−12.2 (10.0)	−2.8 (27.0)	0.0 (32.0)	−1.0 (30.2)	−9.5 (14.9)	−13.6 (7.5)	−31.5 (−24.7)	−43.1 (−45.6)	−47 (−53)
Average precipitation mm (inches)	47.2 (1.86)	36.0 (1.42)	42.9 (1.69)	62.3 (2.45)	64.7 (2.55)	73.6 (2.90)	87.7 (3.45)	89.8 (3.54)	88.4 (3.48)	77.5 (3.05)	63.0 (2.48)	54.4 (2.14)	787.3 (31.00)
Average rainfall mm (inches)	2.2 (0.09)	1.4 (0.06)	10.9 (0.43)	27.5 (1.08)	72.8 (2.87)	84.9 (3.34)	91.5 (3.60)	96.9 (3.81)	90.3 (3.56)	74.9 (2.95)	23.8 (0.94)	3.0 (0.12)	580.0 (22.83)
Average snowfall cm (inches)	66.3 (26.1)	52.7 (20.7)	44.0 (17.3)	22.4 (8.8)	1.6 (0.6)	0.0 (0.0)	0.0 (0.0)	0.0 (0.0)	0.0 (0.0)	4.0 (1.6)	38.5 (15.2)	73.9 (29.1)	303.4 (119.4)
Average precipitation days (≥ 0.2 mm)	16.9	15.0	14.9	14.0	15.0	14.4	15.5	15.4	15.7	18.1	17.7	19.4	191.8
Average rainy days (≥ 0.2 mm)	0.31	0.44	1.7	5.3	11.9	13.9	14.1	14.1	15.3	13.0	4.0	0.87	95.0
Average snowy days (≥ 0.2 cm)	14.7	10.3	8.3	4.1	0.56	0.0	0.0	0.0	0.0	2.1	10.4	15.6	66.0
Average relative humidity (%) (at 15:00)	79.1	67.6	54.6	52.9	49.4	53.9	56.0	60.2	63.7	72.3	80.4	83.8	64.5
Source: Environment and Climate Change Canada (rainfall/snowfall 1981–2010)

== Demographics ==
In the 2021 Census of Population conducted by Statistics Canada, Kirkland Lake had a population of 7,750 living in 3,775 of its 4,353 total private dwellings, a change of −2.9% from its 2016 population of 7,981. With a land area of 261.29 km^{2} (100.88 sq mi), it had a population density of 29.7/km^{2} (76.8/sq mi) in 2021.

Historical census populations – Kirkland Lake

Year	Pop.	±%
1921	1,170	—
1931	9,915	+747.4%
1941	20,409	+105.8%
1951	18,392	−9.9%
1956	17,766	−3.4%
1961	17,422	−1.9%

Year	Pop.	±%
1966	15,784	−9.4%
1971	15,206	−3.7%
1976	13,567	−10.8%
1981	12,219	−9.9%
1986	11,604	−5.0%
1991	10,440	−10.0%

Year	Pop.	±%
1996	9,905	−5.1%
2001	8,616	−13.0%
2006	8,248	−4.3%
2011	8,493	+3.0%
2016	7,981	−6.0%
2021	7,750	−2.9%

Population counts are not adjusted for boundary changes.
Source: Statistics Canada

Canada 2006 Census		Population	% of Total Population
Visible minority group Source:	South Asian	10	0.1
Visible minority group Source:	Chinese	25	0.3
Visible minority group Source:	Black	40	0.5
Visible minority group Source:	Filipino	15	0.2
Visible minority group Source:	Latin American	0	0
Visible minority group Source:	Southeast Asian	0	0
Visible minority group Source:	Other visible minority	0	0
Total visible minority population		90	1.1
Aboriginal group Source:	First Nations	185	2.3
Aboriginal group Source:	Métis	260	3.2
Aboriginal group Source:	Inuit	0	0
Total Aboriginal population		460	5.7
White		7,480	93.2
Total population		8,030	100

== Economy ==
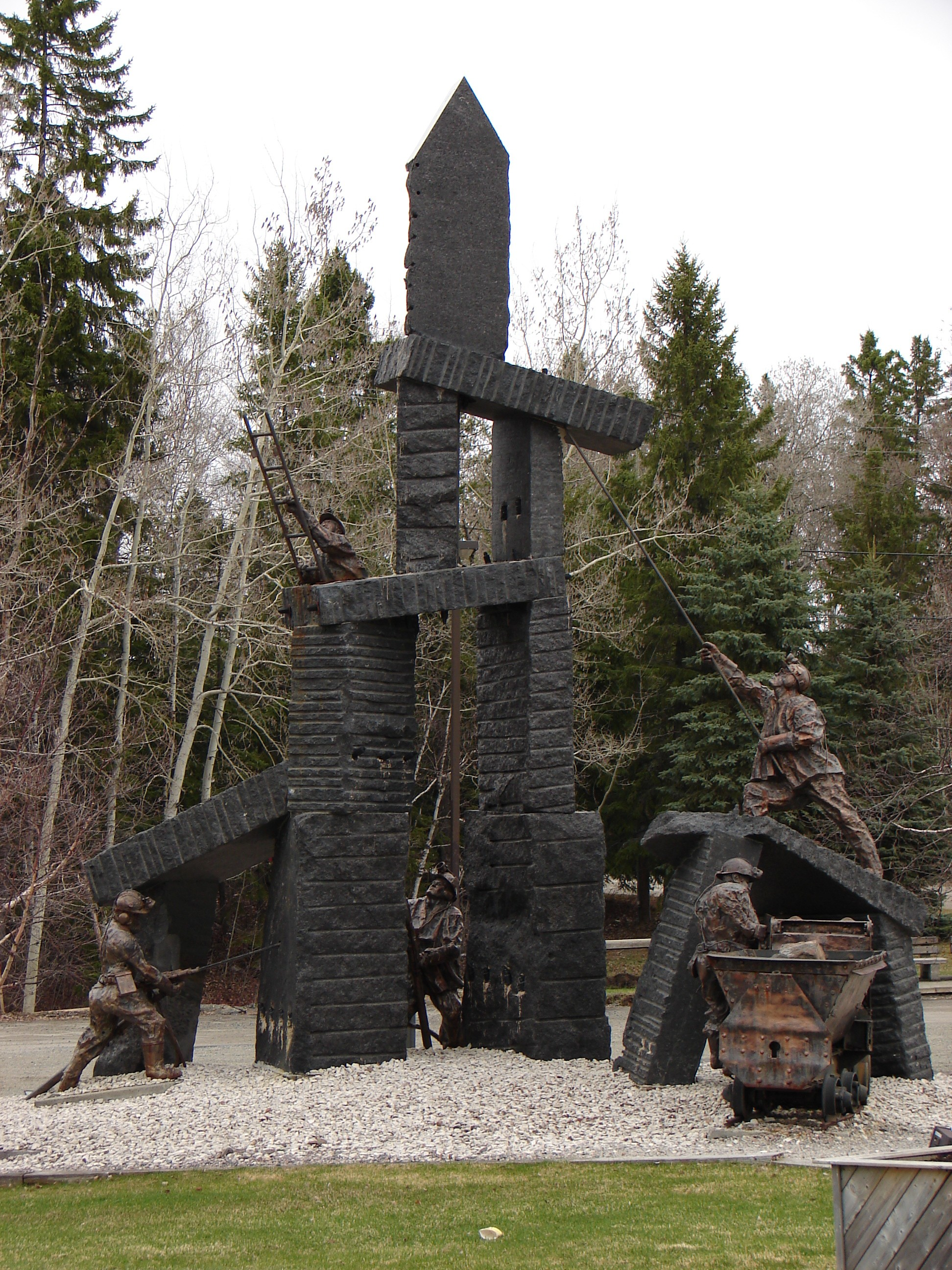
The Miners' Memorial in Kirkland Lake

The town experienced an economic decline in the late 1900s, with the closing of the original mines. That ended in 2001, when Foxpoint Resources (now Kirkland Lake Gold Inc. or KLG) bought five of the mining claims in the town and began intensive exploration work. KLG successfully resuscitated the local mining scene, finding new zones of mineralization that, combined with the steadily increasing price of gold, turned the town around. Today, Kirkland Lake is probably one of the most successful communities of its size in Northern Ontario. Some of the more recent developments include:

- Kirkland Lake Gold Ltd. continues to expand its operations. Since December 2002, the company's confirmed gold reserves have increased by 160% to 2,022,000 tons with an average grade of 0.46 ounces per ton containing a total of 927,000 ounces of gold. In 2003, the Company started a $21 million, 3-year exploration program targeted at adding 15,000,000 tons of ore to reserves and resources. Currently, over 500 personnel are directly or indirectly employed at the mine site. Based on today's resources, the mine has a 12–15 year life span. A recently announced $16 million expansion in its exploration activities is already paying dividends. The mine recently announced the discovery of the richest ore veins ever found in the history of the Kirkland Lake camp, a move which will significantly increase the mine's life span.
- While the forestry industry has been hard hit across Canada, the impact on Kirkland Lake has been mitigated by the conversion of the existing Tembec Forest Products Group's Kenogami sawmill into a value-added centre for the manufacturing of finger-jointed lumber. The new centre, located on the outskirts of KL, opened in July 2006. It will employ between 70 and 92 workers. Under an innovative Public-Private partnership, the municipality is working with Rosko Forestry Operations to establish a specialty sawmill in the Archer Drive Industrial Park that will sell into the Canadian market.
- The local tourism industry has provided a much needed depth to the local economy. Star attractions include the Museum of Northern History at the Sir Harry Oakes Chateau, the Miners' Memorial, and Heritage North (an 18,000-square-foot (1,700 m^{2}) interactive facility telling the story of hockey in the north). Upcoming attractions include a refurbishment of the historical Toburn Headframe. Event based tourism is also strong. Some of the most popular draws include a drag racing event in the summer and a national snow cross racing event in the winter.
- Prospects for an expansion of the Town's white-collar workforce are excellent. Two new high schools as well as a long-term care facility, and a new medical centre promise to make the community more attractive to professionals in the fields of medicine and education. Veterans Affairs Canada is also growing its client service operations. The local office is now the primary service bureau for over 100,000 clients across central and eastern Canada.

Through the 1990s, one of the town's dominant political and economic controversies surrounded a proposal to ship Toronto's garbage to the Adams Mine, an abandoned open pit mine in Boston Township just outside Kirkland Lake.

Kirkland Lake is also self-sufficient when it comes to power production with a generator that produces up to 117MW.

Kirkland Lake also has a shopping mall with stores including Dollarama, easyhome, Hart Stores, Giant Tiger, and Topper's Pizza. The mall also includes local businesses, such as Nail World, a nail salon, and Elegance by Jen, a local hairdresser. It is also the location of the Ontario Northland bus stop.

== Arts and culture ==
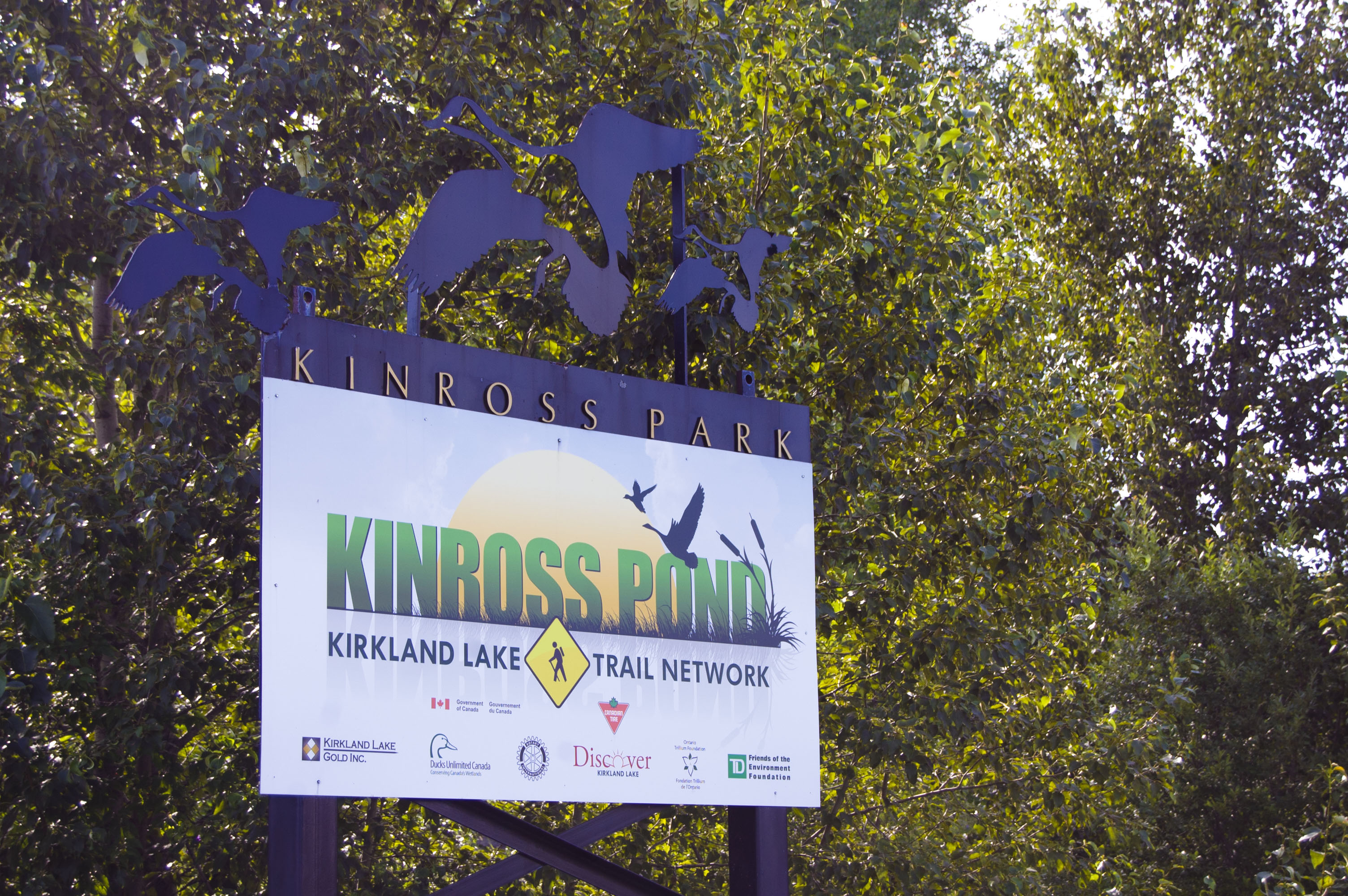
Kinross Pond sign

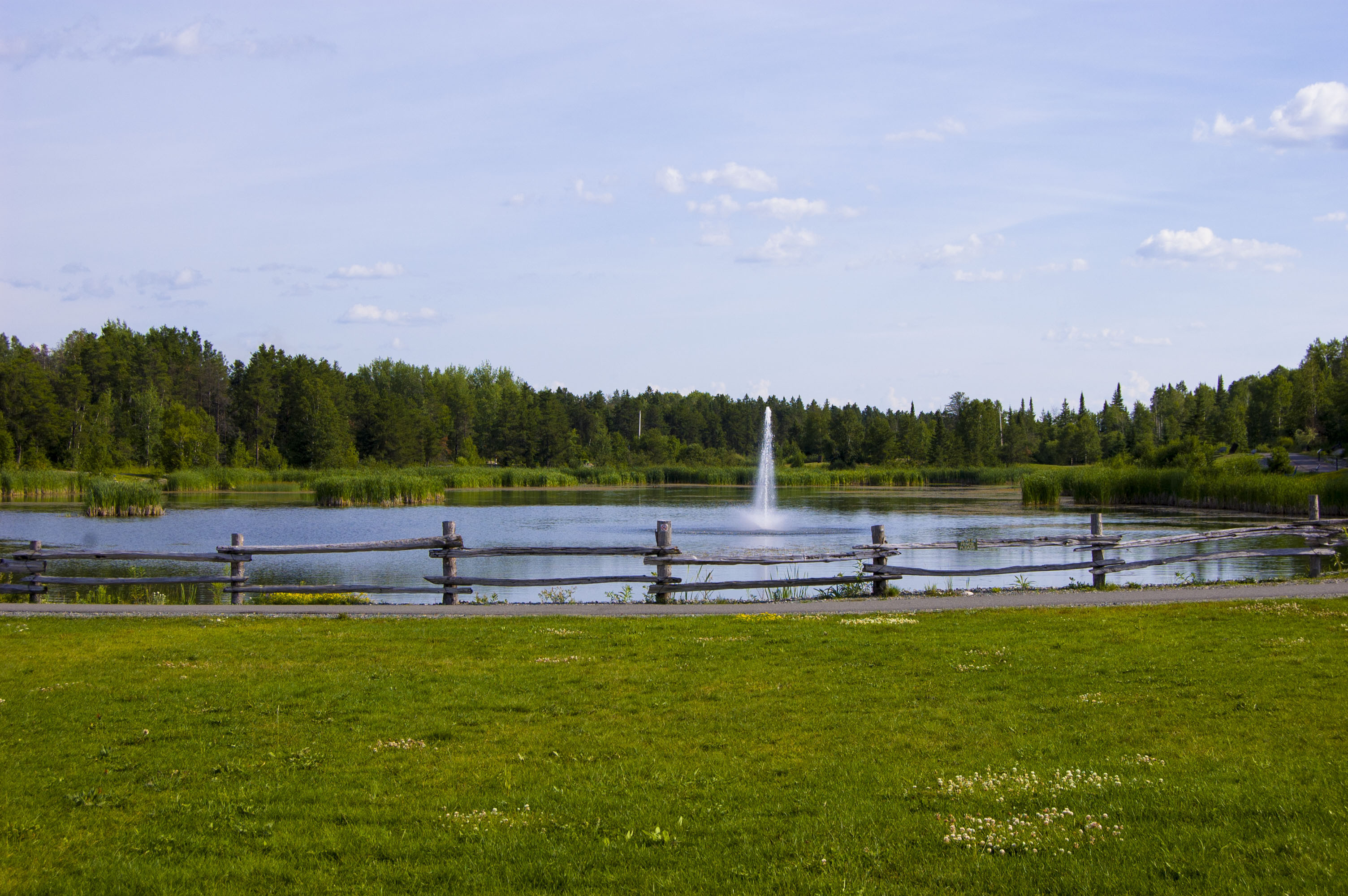
Kinross Pond

The Kirkland Lake area continues to support a strong tourist industry throughout the year. The summers are met with a number of anglers, hunters, and campers looking for adventure. Winters are especially popular as a result of the well maintained snow mobile trails in the area. There are also a number of tourist destinations in the area, including the recently developed Hockey Heritage North. It also has a strong community built on music. Local attractions include:

- Kirkland Lake Miners' Memorial.
- Blueberry Festival - an annual summer event at Esker Lakes Provincial Park.
- Toburn Mine - This mine was the first producing mine in Kirkland Lake and the old headframe is a recognized cultural asset.
- Wright-Hargreaves Park - Site of the former Wright-Hargreaves mine that used to be one of the most productive and deepest gold mines in the world.
- Homecoming Week - during the week of Canada Day (July 1).
- Winter Carnival - beginning in mid-February.

=== Homecoming Week ===
The Kirkland Lake Festivals Committee hosts an annual homecoming week. Many former residents return home for the celebrations. The 2019 homecoming week was a celebration of the community's 100th anniversary.

Homecoming events included free kids events, Shakespeare in the Park, a BMX, skateboard and scooter extreme park competition, a local food fair, free kids matinees, splash park events, golf tournaments, A day in the park at the Toburn Mine site, fireworks and more. The Festivals Committee also hosts free Canada Day celebrations with fireworks.

As of 2022, the Homecoming Week was cancelled indefinitely.

=== Winter Carnival ===
The Kirkland Lake Festivals Committee hosts an annual winter carnival beginning in mid-February. With 18 days of events each year, Kirkland Lake's Winter Carnival is one of Canada's longest winter carnivals. Festivals and Events Ontario has honoured the event with multiple Top 100 Festival awards.

The 2018 Kirkland Lake Winter Carnival featured 18 days of events between February 15–March 4 including: the Alamos Gold $50,000 Ice Fishing Derby, Hockey Tournament, Kids Winter Jam Party featuring the Stars of Pop, 3 nights of Kabaret, Kirkland Lake Skating Club's Ice Show, fireworks, free sleigh rides, a comedy night, free skating parties, a magic show, free kids matinees and the NorthernTel Kids Carnival on the Family Day holiday.

As of 2022, the Winter Carnival was cancelled and events were to be made by the companies and groups on their own, as the Festivals Committee has shut down.

== Infrastructure ==
=== Transportation ===
Inter-city bus services are provided by Ontario Northland Motor Coach Services. A staffed bus station is located at the Kirkland Lake Mall and busses also make flag stops at the site of the former railway station in Swastika.

The Ontario Northland Railway mainline passes through the municipality, with a branch freight line diverging at Swastika east toward Rouyn-Noranda, Quebec. Swastika station was a stop for ONR's Northlander passenger train until the service was discontinued in 2012. The stop will be renamed "Kirkland Lake" and a new permanent heated passenger shelter, replacing the station that was demolished in 2020, will be constructed on the site between 2024 and 2026 in preparation for ONR resuming Northlander service in the mid-2020s.

The Kirkland Lake Airport is located 11.7 kilometres (7.3 mi) outside of the town and serves general aviation. The nearest airports offering scheduled passenger services are Timmins Victor M. Power Airport and Rouyn-Noranda Airport.

Local transportation is also provided to senior citizens and persons with disabilities.

=== Healthcare ===
The Blanche River Health Kirkland Lake site, formerly known as the Kirkland and District Hospital, serves the area.

== Education ==
Kirkland Lake has two secondary schools, each catering to a different language group: the École secondaire catholique l'Envolée du Nord, a French Catholic school; and the Kirkland Lake District Composite School, an English secondary school also featuring French immersion instruction (opened in 2006; from 1923 – 2006 students attended Kirkland Lake Collegiate and Vocational Institute, also known as KLCVI).

Elementary schools in Kirkland Lake include Central Public School (French immersion, public), Federal Public School (English, public), Sacred Heart School, (French immersion and English, Catholic), St. Jerome School (French immersion and English, Catholic), and Ecole Assomption (French, Catholic).

The community is also home to a campus of the Northern College of Applied Arts and Technology.

Northern College offers one-, two- and three-year programs in the fields of technology, business, human services, health and emergency services and veterinary sciences. Northern also offers post-diploma, apprenticeship, skills and job re-entry programs funded by the federal and provincial governments. The college also provides job related training. This includes providing the facilities for the delivery of third party programs, or the development of courses to meet the needs of a company.

Kirkland Lake also includes the Teck Centennial Public Library.

== Media ==
The city's primary newspaper is Northern News. Formerly a daily paper, Northern News now publishes three times per week.

=== Radio ===
- FM 90.3 - CBCR-FM, CBC Radio One
- FM 93.7 - CBON-FM-1, Première Chaîne
- FM 101.5 - CJKL-FM, Hot Adult Contemporary

=== Television ===
The town is served by a rebroadcaster of CITO-TV (CTV) which is officially licensed to the outlying community of Kearns.

== Notable people ==
- John Allan - Canadian Forces officer who served as Commander of Maritime Command from 1979 to 1980
- Ralph Backstrom - NHL hockey player
- Lee Barkell - figure skater (represented Canada - gold medals), high performance coach (Olympic level)
- Mario Bernardi - conductor, pianist
- Don Biederman - racing driver
- Buddy Boone - NHL hockey player
- Laurie Bower - jazz and pop musician
- Robert A. Bryce - Canadian businessman and prospector
- Bill Brydge - NHL hockey player
- Toller Cranston - Olympic figure skater, painter
- Dick Duff - NHL hall of famer
- Les Duff - AHL record holder
- Murray Hall - NHL hockey player
- Ed Havrot - politician
- Karl Brooks Heisey - Canadian mining engineer/executive
- Floyd "Bud" Hillman - AHL and NHL hockey player
- Larry Hillman - NHL and WHA - hockey player and Winnipeg Jets first coach
- Wayne Hillman - NHL and WHA - hockey player
- Michael Hogan - actor
- Bob Howes - professional football player in the CFL and former head football coach for Queen's University
- Kimmo Innanen - astrophysicist
- Daryl Kramp - former politician (elected as the Prince Edward–Hastings MP in 2004)
- Megan Leslie - politician (elected as the Halifax MP in 2008)
- Michael Mahonen - actor
- Diane Marleau - politician
- Kurtis McLean - NHL hockey player
- Frank Melong - AHL hockey player
- Bob Murdoch - NHL hockey player, coach
- Claude Noël - NHL hockey player, former coach of the Winnipeg Jets NHL franchise
- Sir Harry Oakes - mining millionaire
- Barclay Plager - NHL hockey player, coach
- Bill Plager - NHL hockey player
- Bob Plager (1943–2021) - NHL hockey player
- Daren Puppa - NHL hockey player
- Dick Redmond - NHL hockey player
- Mickey Redmond - NHL hockey player, sports broadcaster
- Ann Shipley - reeve, Teck Township (1943–1952)
- Terry Slater - hockey player and coach
- Alan Thicke - actor from Growing Pains and composer of TV theme songs Facts of Life and Diff'rent Strokes
- Mike Walton - NHL and WHA player
- Tom Webster (ice hockey) - NHL and WHA player, NHL coach and scout
- William Henry Wright - mining millionaire

== In popular culture ==
Termini Station was filmed in Kirkland Lake.

== See also ==
- List of francophone communities in Ontario
- Matachewan, Ontario
- Cobalt silver rush
- Porcupine Gold Rush
- Red Lake, Ontario
- Greenstone, Ontario
- Hemlo, Ontario
