= Wright-Hargreaves =

Gold mine located in Kirkland Lake, Ontario

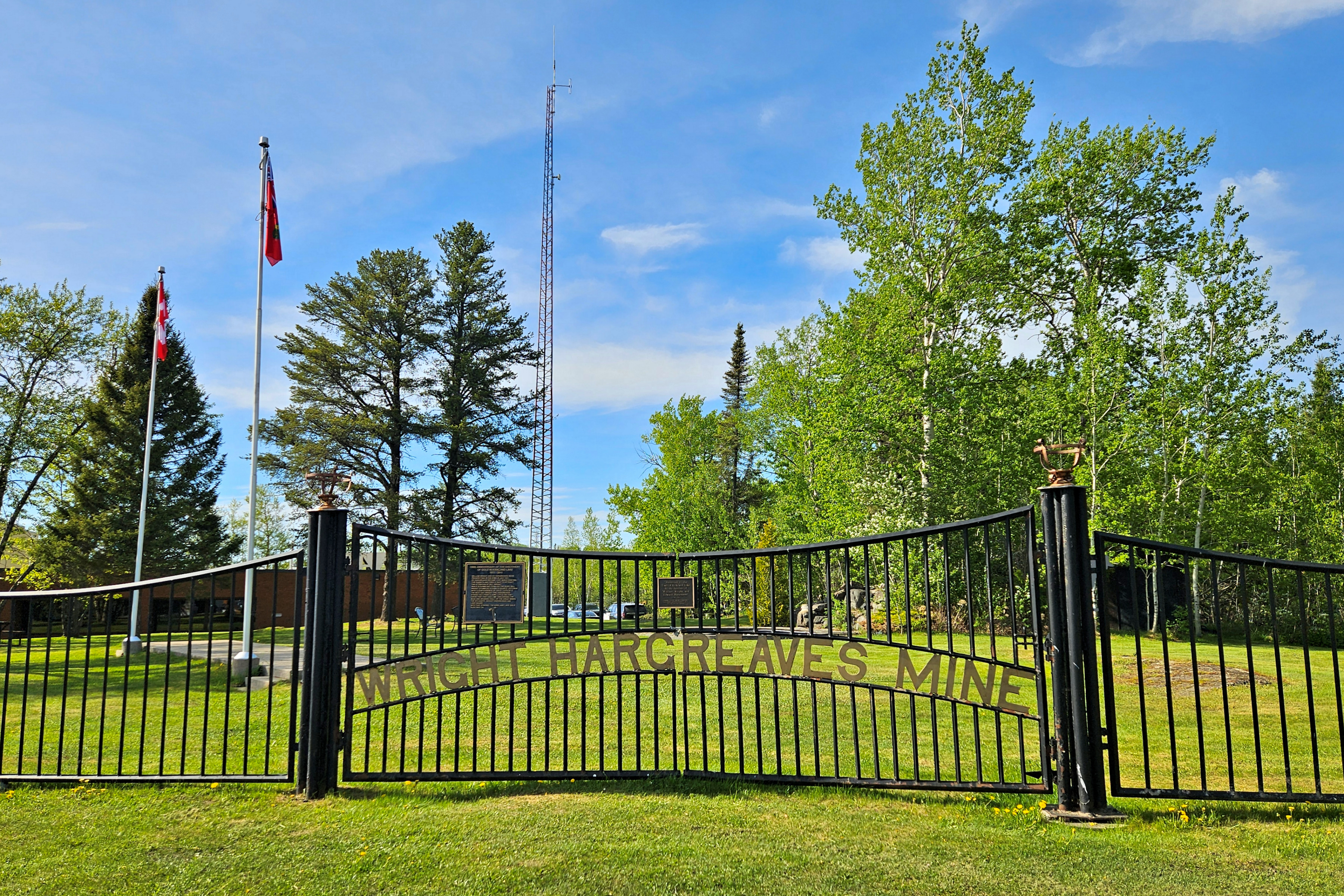
- Former Wright-Hargreaves Mine site, now a park

- Location in Ontario
- Location: Kirkland Lake, Ontario, Canada; 48°9′13.22″N 80°2′3.28″W
- Products: Gold, Silver
- Opened: 1921
- Closed: 1965

The Wright-Hargreaves Mine was a gold mine located in Kirkland Lake, Ontario, Canada. In late July 1911, Bill Wright and his brother-in-law Ed Hargreaves discovered the first visible gold in what would later become the Kirkland Lake camp. In 1913 the No. 1 shaft was sunk to a depth of 85 feet (26 metres). By the end of its production, the Wright-Hargreaves was the deepest mine in the Kirkland Lake camp with workings at the 8,200-foot (2,500-meter) level. The mine was in regular production between 1921 and 1964. Production ceased following a serious rock burst underground in August 1964. The processing plant was previously shutdown in 1957 and production was transported to the Lake Shore mine for processing. Final salvage activities and clean up were completed in 1965, with a total production of 4,821,296 ounces (136,681,400 grams) of gold at an average grade of 0.49 ounces per ton (15.31 grams per metric ton).

== See also ==
- List of mines in Ontario
