= Lake Shore Mine =

Gold mine in Canada

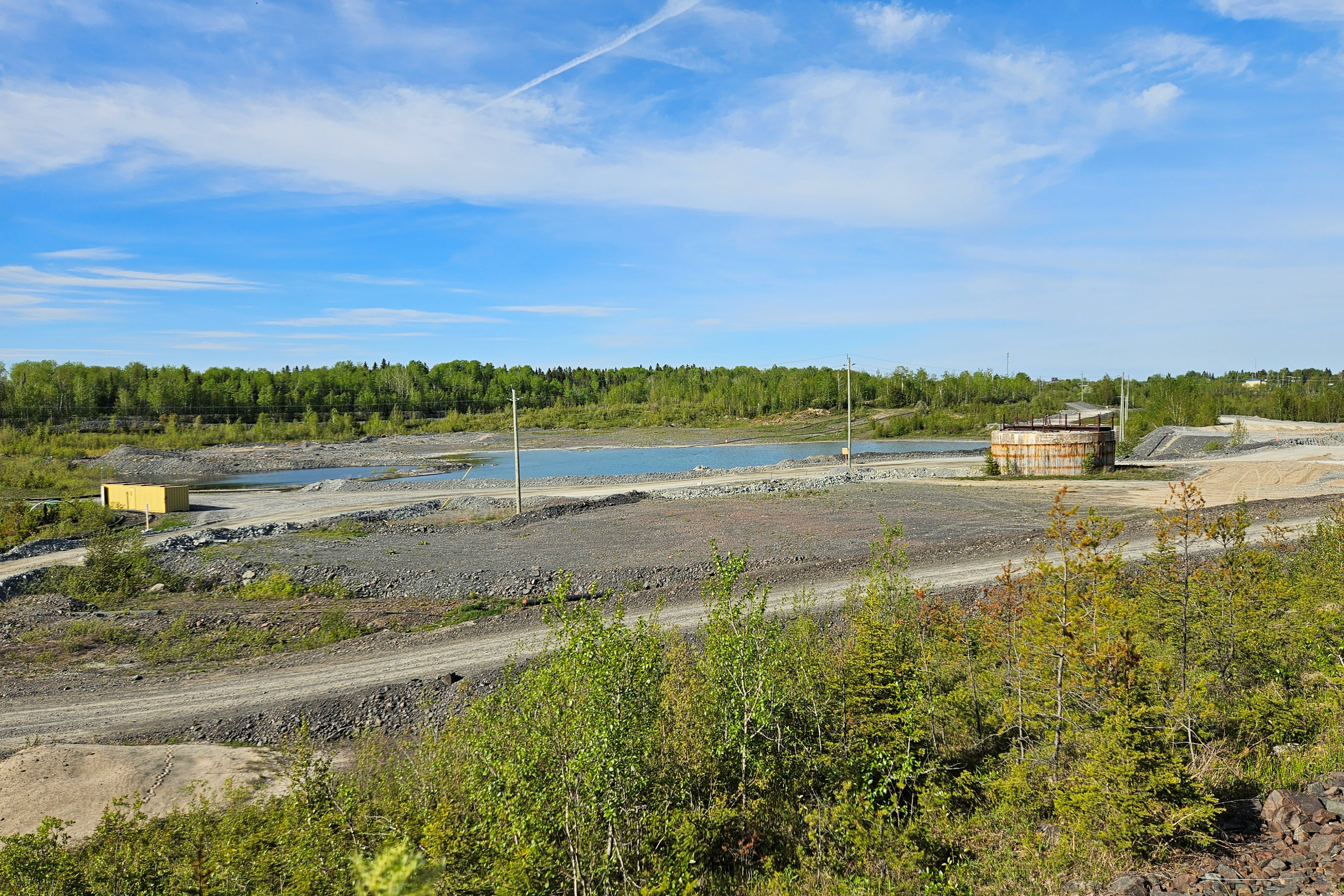
- Lake Shore Mine site

- Location in Ontario
- Location: Kirkland Lake, Ontario, Canada; 48°8′57.07″N 80°2′43.73″W
- Products: Gold
- Opened: 1918
- Closed: 1965

The Lake Shore Mine is a gold mine located in Kirkland Lake, Ontario, Canada. In July 1912, Harry Oakes staked claims L-2605-6 which were in the lake itself and had reverted for non-performance of work. On September 6, 1912, he registered the transfer of claim L-1557 that Melville McDougall had staked for Oakes previously. On September 23, 1911, Harry Oakes registered the transfer of claim T-16635 from George Minaker and named the property Lake Shore. In production from 1918 to 1965, the mine produced almost 8.5 million ounces of gold and represented over a third of the gold produced in the entire camp. The closure of the mine once known as the 'Jewel box of North America' in 1965 was the result of a number of factors including a declining ore reserve picture, unfruitful exploration, increased water inflow into the workings from other closed mines exceeding pump capacity and unstable workings at depth. The mill operated until 1968 re-milling historic tailings. The surface plant was demolished in 1969.

The mine reopened in 1981 by new owners LAC Minerals and operated intermittently as an exploration project along with pillar recovery and tailings processing with material processed at the nearby Macassa Mill. Activity ceased in 1987 and the property has followed the chain of ownership of the Macassa mine.

== See also ==
- List of mines in Ontario
