= Hockey Heritage North =

Conference and events centre in Ontario, Canada

Heritage North
- Established: June 29, 2006
- Location: Kirkland Lake, Ontario, Canada
- Coordinates: 48.145724°N 80.054128°W
- Type: Conference and Events Centre

Heritage North, formerly known as Hockey Heritage North, is a conference and events center in Kirkland Lake, Ontario, Canada. Started as Hockey Heritage North, a hockey museum, it officially opened on June 29, 2006, and was established as a foundation in January 2008.
