= Osisko Mining =

Canadian mining company

Osisko Mining, Inc.
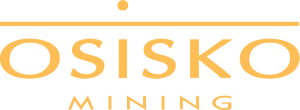
- Traded as: TSX: OSK
- Industry: Mining
- Predecessor: Oban Mining Corporation
- Founded: February 26, 2010; 16 years ago
- Headquarters: Toronto, Ontario, Canada
- Key people: John Burzynski (CEO)
- Owner: Gold Fields (2024–present)
- Website: www.osiskomining.com

Osisko Mining Inc. (formerly Oban Mining Corporation) is a Canadian company that conducts mineral exploration work with a focus on seeking to develop a gold mine in Ontario or Quebec. It adopted its name following the 2015 merger of five companies that resulted in the re-uniting of the executive management team of the original Osisko Mining Corporation.

On October 25, 2024, Gold Fields completed the acquisition of Osisko Mining for $1.39 billion.

== History ==
The new Osisko Mining Corporation is the continuation of Oban Mining Corporation, which itself was the result of the 2014 merger between two Toronto Stock Exchange-listed mineral exploration companies active in South America, Braeval Mining Corporation and Oban Exploration Limited.

The other mineral exploration companies involved in the 2015 merger were the TSX Venture Exchange-listed companies Eagle Hill Exploration whose Windfall Lake project would become Osisko's principal project, Temex Resources who brought with it net smelter return royalties on the Canadian Malartic Mine and Goldcorp's Éléonore mine, as well as Corona Gold and Ryan Gold whose primary assets were cash and securities.

With John Burzynski emerging as the CEO, Oban would acquire TSX-Venture listed companies Northern Gold Mining, for its Golden Bear project in Ontario, and NioGold Mining Corporation, for its Marban project in Quebec, before it re-named itself to Osisko Mining Corporation in June 2016.

In 2018, the company was re-aligned its board of directors. In 2019, Osisko acquired the Stornoway Diamond Corporation for its Renard diamond mine, and through its subsidiary O3 Mining Inc. acquired Alexandria Minerals Corporation.

On October 25, 2024, the acquisition of Osisko Mining for $1.39 billion by Gold Fields was completed.
