= List of gold mines in Canada =

This list of gold mines in Canada is subsidiary to the list of mines article and lists working, defunct and future mines in the country. For practical purposes, defunct and future mines are demarcated in italics and bold respectively. Asterisks (*) note mines which produce(d) gold as a secondary product.

== British Columbia ==
Mine	Coordinates	Location	Owner	Dates	Comments
Blue Hawk Mine	49°59′2″N 119°30′30.59″W	Kelowna		1934	Also produced silver
Bralorne	50°46′29″N 122°48′52″W	Ogden		????-1971	Produced 4.2 million ounces
Defot Creek Mine	58°54′00″N 130°27′00″W	Defot		1880-1915	
Hedley Mascot Mine	49°22′15″N 120°02′51″W	Hedley		1936-1949	
Kemess Mine	57°0′17″N 126°45′31″W	Thutade Lake			
Mount Polley mine	52°30′48″N 121°35′47″W	Likely	Imperial Metals Corp	1997-Present	
Pioneer Mine	50°45′34″N 122°46′47″W	Ogden		1920-1960	

== New Brunswick ==
Mine	Coordinates	Location	Owner	Dates	Comments
Murray Brook Mine	47°31′34″N 66°25′53″W	Restigouche County	NovaGold Resources	1989-1992	

== Nova Scotia ==
Mine	Coordinates	Location	Owner	Dates	Comments
Catcha Lake	44°44′09″N 63°11′40″W	Catcha Lake	Acadian Gold Corporation	1882	s planning to drill for samples in the future .
Stirling Mine	N 45° 43' 44.8536 E -60° 26' 17.2356	Stirling, Richmond County, Cape Breton	Stirling Zinc Co., Mindamar Metals, Thundermin Resources Ltd (Current)	1925-1957	Produced silver, zinc and gold.
Moose River Consolidated	44°59′9.23″N 62°56′4.96″W	Middle Musquodoboit	Atlantic Gold Corporation, St Barbara Limited (Current)	2018-Present	Touquoy and Beaver Dam gold mines

== Ontario ==
Mine	Coordinates	Location	Owner	Dates	Comments
Barton Mine*	47°07′08.75″N 79°47′09.58″W	Temagami		1906-1918	Secondary products included gold, silver, copper and bismuth.
Beanland Mine	47°05′28.71″N 79°49′30.83″W	Temagami		1937-1938	Also produced silver
Big Dan Mine	47°05′28.53″N 79°46′28.95″W	Temagami		1906-1907	Also produced silver and arsenic
Chesterville gold mine	48.13889°N 79.57389°W	McGarry	Chesterfield Larder Lake Gold Mining Company	1939-1950	
Copperfields Mine*	46°57′44.41″N 80°02′13.67″W	Temagami		1954-1972	Secondary products included cobalt, gold, nickel, palladium, platinum and silver.
David Bell Mine		Hemlo		closed 2013	smallest of the three Hemlo mines
Detour Lake Mine	50°1′8.75″N 79°42′54.08″W	Cochrane	Agnico Eagle Mines	1983-Present	
Dome Mine	48°27′N 081°14′W	Timmins			
Golden Giant Mine	48.00°41′N 85.00°54′W	Hemlo		1985-2006	Produced over 7 million ounces as well as a small amount of silver.
Hermiston-McCauley Mine	47°05′54.30″N 79°49′38.18″W	Temagami		1935-1940	
Kanichee Mine*	47°06′13.07″N 79°50′38.63″W	Temagami		1937-1948, 1948-1949, 1973-1976	Secondary products included gold, palladium, silver and platinum.
Kerr-Addison Mine	48°08′19″N 79°34′39″W	McGarry	Kerr Addison Mines Ltd	1900s to 1996	
Leckie Mine	47°05′36.34″N 79°47′48.68″W	Temagami		~1900-1909, 1933-1937	Also produced arsenic, copper and silver
Madsen Mine	50.967143°N 93.917692°W	Red Lake	West Red Lake Gold Mines	1938 - 1976, 1997 - 1999, 2021 - 2022, 2025 - Present	
Matachewan Consolidated mine		Matachewan		1916 to 1954	
McIntyre Mines					
Norrie Mine*	47°06′59.59″N 79°46′27.63″W	Temagami		Prior to 1920	Secondary products included lead, gold, zinc and silver.
Northland Pyrite Mine*	47°10′26.24″N 79°44′34.45″W	Temagami		1906-1911	Secondary products included cobalt, copper, zinc, gold and nickel.
Red Lake Mine	51°3′40.16″N 93°44′35.34″W	Red Lake	Evolution Mining	1949 - Present	
Richardson Mine		Eldorado	Kim Woodside	1867-1869	Ontario's first gold mine
Temagami-Lorrain Mine	47°06′39.79″N 79°40′58.2″W	Temagami		Prior to 1912	Also produced cobalt, arsenic, silver, nickel and copper
Williams Mine		Hemlo			largest of the three Hemlo mines
Young-Davidson mine		Matachewan	Alamos Gold	~1916 to 1957 2010- Present	

== Quebec ==
Mine	Coordinates	Location	Owner	Dates	Comments
Canadian Malartic Mine	48°6′42.33″N 78°7′53.91″W	Malartic	Agnico-Eagle Mines	1935-Present	
Casa Berardi Mine	49°34′23.19″N 79°14′13.19″W	La Sarre	Hecla Mining	1988-Present	
LaRonde mine	48°14′54.3″N 78°26′30.01″W	Rivière-Héva	Agnico-Eagle Mines	1988-Present	

== Northwest Territories ==
Mine	Coordinates	Location	Owner	Dates	Comments
Beaulieu Mine	62°26′32″N 114°23′51″W	Yellowknife		1947-1948	Only a total of 30 troy ounces were recovered.
Burwash Mine	62°24′N 114°24′W	Yellowknife		1934-????	The Burwash Mine has some historical significance in that the original ore sample kept "gold fever" alive in the area and helped in the establishment of Yellowknife as a viable northern community.
Camlaren Mine	62°59′11.17″N 113°12′48.42″W		Mining Corporation of Canada Limited	1963-1991	The Camlaren property is now part of the Gordon Lake Project.
Colomac Mine	64°12′00″N 116°01′11″W		Canada	1990–1992 1994-1997	
Con Mine	62°26′20″N 114°22′18″W		Newmont Mining Corporation		
Discovery Mine	63°11′12.01″N 113°53′30.01″W		GoldMining Inc.		
Giant Mine	62°29′59″N 114°21′31″W		Miramar Mining Corporation		
Lost McLeod Mine					
Negus Mine	62°26′2″N 114°21′37″W		Negus Mines Limited	1939-1952	
Outpost Island Mine	61°44′8.88″N 113°27′32.04″W		Tungsten Corporation of Canada Limited	1936-1952	
Ptarmigan and Tom Mine	62°31′15.0″N 114°11′45.0″W	Yellowknife	Equitas Resources Corporation	1941-Present	
Ruth Mine	62°27′44.0″N 112°34′23.0″W	Yellowknife		1941-1959	
Salmita Mine	64°04′45.0″N 111°14′45.0″W		Giant Yellowknife Mines Limited	1983-1987	
Thompson-Lundmark Mine	62°36′43.2″N 113°28′26.4″W			1941-1949	
Tundra Mine	64°03′26.0″N 111°10′34.0″W		Royal Oak Mines Inc	1962-1968	

== Nunavut ==
Mine	Coordinates	Location	Owner	Dates	Comments
Lupin Mine	65°45′00.0″N 111°15′00.0″W		WPC Resources	1982-Present	
Meadowbank Gold Mine	65°01′07.0″N 96°04′26.0″W	Kivalliq	Agnico-Eagle Mines	2010-2017	
Meliadine Gold Mine	63°1′55.29″N 92°13′15.84″W	Kivalliq	Agnico-Eagle Mines	2019-Present	
