= List of mines in the Northwest Territories =

This is a list of mines in the Northwest Territories and includes both operating and closed mines. Mines that are in operation are in italics. The list does not include mines that were operating prior to 1999 in what is now Nunavut.

Mine	Major commodities	Closest town	Region/locality	Owner(s)	Dates	Comments	Coordinates	References
Beaulieu Mine	Gold	Yellowknife	North Slave Region				62°25′03″N 112°54′09″W	
Burwash Mine	Gold	Yellowknife	North Slave Region				62°27′45″N 114°19′00″W	
Camlaren Mine	Gold	Yellowknife	North Slave Region				62°59′12″N 113°12′17″W	
Cantung Mine	Tungsten	Tungsten	Dehcho Region	North American Tungsten			61°57′25″N 128°12′10″W	
Colomac Mine	Gold	Gamèti	North Slave Region				64°24′00″N 115°06′00″W	
Con Mine	Gold	Yellowknife	North Slave Region				62°26′20″N 114°22′18″W	
Diavik Diamond Mine	Diamonds	Wekweeti	North Slave Region	Dominion Diamond Corporation; Diavik Diamond Mines (Rio Tinto)^{A}			64°29′46″N 110°16′24″W	
Discovery Mine	Gold	Yellowknife	North Slave Region				63°11′14″N 113°53′48″W	
Echo Bay Mines	Silver	Port Radium / Deline^{D}	Sahtu Region				66°03′18″N 118°00′00″W	
Ekati Diamond Mine	Diamonds	Wekweeti	North Slave Region	Dominion Diamond Corporation; Charles E. Fipke; Stewart Blusson^{B}			64°42′49″N 110°37′10″W	
Eldorado Mine	Radium, uranium	Port Radium/Deline^{D}	Sahtu Region				66°05′06″N 118°02′16″W	
Gahcho Kue Diamond Mine Project	Diamonds	Lutselk'e	North Slave Region	Mountain Province Diamonds; De Beers Canada; Camphor Ventures^{C}			63°26′05″N 109°12′02″W	
Giant Mine	Gold	Yellowknife	North Slave Region				62°29′59″N 114°21′31″W	
Negus Mine	Gold	Yellowknife	North Slave Region				62°26′10″N 114°21′00″W	
Outpost Island Mine	Gold, tungsten	Fort Resolution	South Slave Region				61°44′08″N 113°27′32″W	
Pine Point Mine	Lead, zinc	Pine Point / Fort Resolution^{D}	South Slave Region				60°52′13″N 114°27′21″W	
Ptarmigan and Tom Mine	Gold	Yellowknife	North Slave Region				62°31′15″N 114°11′45″W	
Prairie Creek Mine	Lead, zinc, silver	Nahanni Butte	Dehcho Region	NorZinc			61°33′38″N 124°47′41″W	
Quartz Mountain mine	Gold							
Rayrock Mine	Uranium	Whatì	North Slave Region				63°26′38″N 116°33′03″W	
Ruth Mine	Gold	Yellowknife	North Slave Region				62°27′44″N 112°34′23″W	
Salmita Mine	Gold	Wekweeti	North Slave Region				64°04′45″N 111°14′45″W	
Snap Lake Diamond Mine	Diamonds	Wekweeti	North Slave Region	De Beers Canada			63°36′20″N 110°52′00″W	
Thompson-Lundmark Mine	Gold	Yellowknife	North Slave Region				62°36′43″N 113°28′26″W	
Thor Lake mine	Rare-earth elements	Yellowknife	North Slave Region				62°05′55″N 112°34′34″W	
Tundra Mine	Gold	Wekweeti	North Slave Region				64°03′26″N 111°10′34″W	

== See also ==
- List of mines in British Columbia
- List of mines in Nunavut

== Notes ==
A. Harry Winston Diamond Mines owns 40% and Diavik Diamond Mines, which is 100% owned by the Rio Tinto, owns 60%.
B. Dominion Diamond Corporation owns 88.9% while Charles Fipke and Stewart Blusson each own 10%.
C. Mountain Province Diamonds owns 44%, De Beers Canada 51% and Camphor Ventures 4.9%
D. Pine Point and Port Radium are ghost towns. Deline and Fort Resolution are the closest modern communities
