= Northwest Territories and Yukon Radio System =

Defunct Canadian Arctic radio communications service

- Founded: 1923
- Defunct: 1960
- Headquarters: Edmonton, Alberta, Canada
- Services: Radio Network

The Northwest Territories and Yukon Radio System was a radio service spanning the Northwest Territories and the Yukon, in existence from 1923 until 1959. It was created for easy communication between the towns or outposts and the rest of the country and was disbanded in 1959 when the system stations were taken over by the Department of Transport.

The NWT&Y Radio System was created in 1923 after the Department of the Interior, realizing the possibilities of wireless telegraphy to cover the vast areas of the northland, requested the Defence Department consider the installation of Army Radio stations to provide a reliable and rapid means of communication. At that time the only means of communication with civilization, or "outside" as it was known, was a limited mail service by boat in summer and dog-team in winter and an unreliable wire telegraph service from Dawson City, Yukon to Hazelton, British Columbia operated by the Dominion Government Telegraph Service.

The first connection was established between Dawson City and Mayo (both in Yukon), in 1923, by the Royal Canadian Corps of Signals (RCCS). It was the first wireless radio service to offer communications between the North and the rest of Canada. Although originally built to aid in the administration of the North as well as to facilitate commercial development of the area, the radio system exceeded its original intent by providing communities with both a social centre and a lifeline to link isolated northern communities to one another as well as to the rest of the world.

Once established, the system expanded very quickly and, by 1948, there were 23 northern stations in operation. The number of stations varied over the years expanding and contracting in response to commercial and industrial development.

In addition to the radio-telegraph, the system also provided other services to the general public. From 1938 until 1942, under an agreement with Alberta Government Telephones, a radiotelephone service was provided at the following RC Signals stations: Edmonton, McMurray, Fort Smith, Yellowknife and Goldfields. Repeater equipment was installed in the Edmonton Radio Station with connections to the offices of the Alberta Government Telephones from where local or long distance connections were made in the normal manner. At the northern stations, telephone booths were installed and tied in with the HF transmitting and receiving equipment. It was greeted and used enthusiastically by mining and transportation companies particularly as well as the general public, for both business and social calls.

Another service provided by staff at many of the RC Signals stations was a local radio broadcast service that enabled those in the community to listen to news, weather and music. Starting on 1 April 1949 the NWT&Y Radio System started rebroadcasting the full daily program of the CBC (7 a.m.-midnight). A connection was made between the CBC studios in the MacDonald Hotel and the transmitter site of the Edmonton Radio Station which rebroadcast on 8265 Kcs using a 5 kilowatt Marconi TH41 transmitter. At those stations where RC Signals were operating low-power broadcast transmitters for the benefit of their communities, 8265 Kcs was monitored and the CBC programs again re-broadcast on the local standard broadcast frequency.

Starting in the early 1950s, some of the stations were handed over the Department of Transport. By 1960 all the stations had been handed over or closed, signalling the end of the military control of these stations, and the start of the civilian control. The Department of Transport continued to run the telegraph stations for a time and CBC took command of broadcasting their programming to these towns, leading to the creation of CBC North.

== NWT&Y Radio System Stations ==
Town/Outpost	Date Opened	Date Closed/Transferred	Specific Purpose
Aklavik	1925	1959, Transferred to CBC	Weather, Contact
Baker Lake	1945	1949, Transferred to the Department of Transport	Weather
Beaverlodge	1945	1959, Transferred to the Department of Transport	Eldorado Mine
Brochet	1948	1956, Transferred to the Department of Transport	Weather, Contact
Burwash Landing	1935	1939, Closed due to the Second World War	Weather, Contact
Cameron Bay	1933	1960, Transferred to the Department of Transport	Weather, Eldorado Mine
Camsell River	1932	1936, Along with the closure of the mines	White Eagle Silver Mines
Chipewyan	1933	1958, Transferred to the Department of Transport	Weather, Communications
Dawson	1923	1960, Transferred to the Department of Transport	Contact, Communication, CFYT-FM
Edmonton	1924	1959, Transferred to the Department of Transport	Headquarters of the Northwest Territories and Yukon Radio System
Embarras	1944	1952, Transferred to the Department of Transport	Weather, Contact
Ennadai Lake	1949	1954, Transferred to the Department of Transport	Weather
Gordon Lake	1937	1939, With the closure of the Camlaren Mines	Unknown
Goldfields	1936	1939, With the outbreak of the Second World War	Multiple mining companies including Consolidated Mining & Smelting, Athona, Greenlee, Murmac, Athabasca Portals
Fort Good Hope	1944	1959, Transferred to the Department of Transport	Weather, Contact
Grande Prairie	1939	1947	Never used due to the Second World War
Hay River	1944	1958, Transferred to the Department of Transport	Weather, Contact, Communications
Herschel Island	1934	1938	Communications
Inuvik	1957	1959, Transferred to the Department of Transport	Communications
Mayo	1923	1960, Transferred to the Department of Transport	Weather, Contact, Communications
McMurray	1933	1958, Transferred to the Department of Transport	Weather, Contact, Communications, Air Base
Fort Norman	1930	1959, Transferred to the Department of Transport	Weather, Communications
Norman Wells	1943	1959, Transferred to the Department of Transport	Weather, Imperial Oil
Norite Bay	1937	1937, With the closure of the Fondulac Mines	Contact, Communications with Fondulac Mines
North Battleford	1938	1939, With the outbreak of the Second World War	Relay Station
Outpost Island	1936	1938, With the closure of the Slave Lake Gold Mines	Serviced the Slave Lake Gold Mines
Pensive Lake	1939	1939, With the closure of the Domie Mines	Serviced Domie Mining
Fort Providence	1939	1959, Transferred to the Department of Transport	Weather, assist air and water transportation up and down the Mackenzie River
Port Radium	1932	1960, Transferred to the Department of Transport	Weather, Communications, Eldorado Mine
Fort Rae	1931	1937, Moved to Yellowstone	Weather, Contact, Communications
Fort Resolution	1927	1960, Transferred to the Department of Transport	Weather, Communications
Fort Reliance	1948	1959, Transferred to the Department of Transport	Weather
Fort Simpson	1924	1959, Transferred to the Department of Transport	Weather, Contact, Main relay point for Yukon
Fort Smith	1924	1958, Transferred to the Department of Transport	Weather, Contact, Administrative Headquarters for Northwest Territories
Snare River	1946	1949, Upon the completion of the Snare River Hydro Project	Communications, Snare River Hydro Project
Thompson Lake	1939	1939, With the outbreak of the Second World War	Communications, Regional mining Companies
Tuktoyaktuk	1935	1939, With the outbreak of the Second World War	Seasonal support to Hudson Bay Company
Whitehorse	1935	1951, Transferred to the Canadian Army Signal System (CASS)	Weather, Contact, Communications
Wrigley	1942	1955, Transferred to the Department of Transport	Weather, Canadian Airways landing strip
Yellowknife	1937	1959, Transferred to the Department of Transport	Communications for the town and regional mining

The above table based on information from the Northwest Territories and Yukon Radio System History Project.
