= List of Canadian airports by location indicator: CT =

This is a list of all Nav Canada certified and registered water and land airports, aerodromes and heliports in the provinces and territories of Canada sorted by location identifier.

They are listed in the format:

- Location indicator – IATA – Airport name (alternate name) – Airport location

== CT – Canada – CAN ==
Also see airport category and list.

TC LID	IATA	Airport name	Community	Province or territory
CTA2		Sept-Îles (Hydro-Québec) Heliport	Sept-Îles	Quebec
CTA3		Île aux Coudres Airport	L'Isle-aux-Coudres	Quebec
CTA4		Saint-Bruno-de-Guigues Aerodrome	Saint-Bruno-de-Guigues	Quebec
CTA5		Val-d'Or/Rivière Piché Water Aerodrome	Val-d'Or	Quebec
CTA6		Bracebridge (Tinkham Field) Aerodrome	Bracebridge	Ontario
CTA9		Ottawa/Gatineau (Casino) Heliport	Gatineau	Quebec
CTB2		Thunder Bay (Health Science Centre) Heliport	Thunder Bay	Ontario
CTB6	ZTB	Tête-à-la-Baleine Airport	Tête-à-la-Baleine	Quebec
CTB7		Taber (Health Centre) Heliport	Taber	Alberta
CTB8		Cold Lake/Three Bears Landing Aerodrome	Cold Lake	Alberta
CTC2		Saint-Alphonse/Lac Cloutier Water Aerodrome	Saint-Alphonse-de-Granby	Quebec
CTD3		Lac Sébastien Water Aerodrome	Saint-David-de-Falardeau (Lac Sébastien)	Quebec
CTE3		Havre Saint-Pierre Water Aerodrome	Havre-Saint-Pierre	Quebec
CTF2		Tofield (Health Centre) Heliport	Tofield	Alberta
CTF3		Causapscal Airport	Causapscal	Quebec
CTF4		Dundalk (Tripp Field) Aerodrome	Dundalk	Ontario
CTF5		Pierceland (Turchyn Field) Aerodrome	Pierceland	Saskatchewan
CTF6		Lethbridge (Taylor Field) Aerodrome	Lethbridge	Alberta
CTG2		Montréal/Met (Aéroport Métropolitain de Montéal) Heli-Inter Heliport	Longueuil	Quebec
CTG3		du Rocher-Percé (Pabok) Airport	Grande-Rivière	Quebec
CTH3		Les Bergeronnes Aerodrome	Les Bergeronnes	Quebec
CTH4		Two Hills (Health Centre) Heliport	Two Hills	Alberta
CTH5		Harrington Harbour Heliport	Harrington Harbour	Quebec
CTH6		La Tuque Water Aerodrome	La Tuque	Quebec
CTH7		Rivière-aux-Saumons Aerodrome	Rivière-aux-Saumons	Quebec
CTH8		Cookstown/Tally-Ho Field Aerodrome	Cookstown	Ontario
CTH9		Saint-Augustin Heliport	Saint-Augustin	Quebec
CTI2		Thunder Bay/Two Island Lake Water Aerodrome	Thunder Bay	Ontario
CTK8		Abbotsford (Teck) Heliport	Abbotsford	British Columbia
CTM2		Temagami/Mine Landing Water Aerodrome	Temagami	Ontario
CTM4		Toronto (St. Michael's Hospital) Heliport	Toronto	Ontario
CTM5		Burk's Falls/Katrine (Three Mile Lake) Water Aerodrome	Burk's Falls	Ontario
CTM6		Timmins (Timmins & District Hospital) Heliport	Timmins	Ontario
CTM7		Tundra Mine/Salamita [sic] Mine Aerodrome	Tundra Mine / Salmita Mine	Northwest Territories
CTM8		Témiscouata-sur-le-Lac Water Aerodrome	Témiscouata-sur-le-Lac	Quebec
CTM9		Oakville (Trafalgar Memorial Hospital) Heliport	Oakville	Ontario
CTN6		Treherne (South Norfolk Airpark) Aerodrome	Treherne	Manitoba
CTN8		Nairn (Triple Nickel) Aerodrome	Nairn	Ontario
CTP3		Barrage Gouin Water Aerodrome	Barrage Gouin Lodge (Saint-Maurice River)	Quebec
CTP4		Lac Pau (Caniapiscau) Water Aerodrome	Caniapiscau	Quebec
CTP5		St. Paul (Saint Therese Healthcare Centre) Heliport	St. Paul	Alberta
CTP9	YAU	Kattiniq/Donaldson Airport	Kattiniq	Quebec
CTQ2		Stanstead/Weller Airport	Stanstead	Quebec
CTR3		Tottenham/Ronan Aerodrome	Tottenham	Ontario
CTR4		Granby/Artopex Plus Heliport	Granby	Quebec
CTR5		Norland/Shadow Lake (Trotter) Water Aerodrome	Norland (Shadow Lake)	Ontario
CTR6		Saint-Basile (Marcotte) Aerodrome	Saint-Basile	Quebec
CTR7		Ottawa/Rockcliffe Water Aerodrome	Ottawa	Ontario
CTR8		Fraserwood/Tribble Ranch Field Aerodrome	Fraserwood	Manitoba
CTS3		Lac Berthelot Water Aerodrome	Lac Berthelot	Quebec
CTS6		Hespero/Safron Residence Heliport	Hespero	Alberta
CTT5	ZGS	La Romaine Airport	La Romaine	Quebec
CTU2		Fontages Airport	Fontanges	Quebec
CTU5	ZLT	La Tabatière Airport	La Tabatière	Quebec
CTV2		Lac-des-Écorces Water Aerodrome	Lac-des-Écorces	Quebec
CTV4		Kleinburg (Tavares Field) Aerodrome	Kleinburg	Ontario
CTX2		Lac Trévet Water Aerodrome	Lac Trévet	Quebec
CTY3		Cascades Water Aerodrome	Cascades	Quebec
CTY5		Rougemont Aerodrome	Rougemont	Quebec

== CU – Canada – CAN ==
Also see airport category and list.

TC LID	IATA	Airport name	Community	Province or territory
CUB2		Buckhorn/Upper Buckhorn Lake Water Arodrome	Buckhorn (Buckhorn Lake)	Ontario
CUT2		Port Perry/Utica Field Aerodrome	Port Perry	Ontario

== CV – Canada – CAN ==
Also see airport category and list.

TC LID	IATA	Airport name	Community	Province or territory
CVA3		Kelowna (Valhalla) Heliport	Kelowna	British Columbia
CVB2		Voisey's Bay Aerodrome	Voisey's Bay Mine	Newfoundland and Labrador
CVB6		Val-d'Or (Huard) Water Aerodrome	Val-d'Or	Quebec
CVC2		Voyageur Channel Water Aerodrome	Killarney	Ontario
CVF2		Fergus (Vodarek Field) Aerodrome	Fergus	Ontario
CVF3		Bethany/Whitetail Valley Farm Aerodrome	Bethany	Ontario
CVG8		Vegerville (St. Joseph's General Hospital) Heliport	Vegreville	Alberta
CVH2		Vermilion Health Centre Heliport	Vermilion	Alberta
CVH3		Vanderhoof Water Aerodrome	Vanderhoof	British Columbia
CVH7		Vulcan (Hospital) Heliport	Vulcan	Alberta
CVL2		Vulcan/Kirkcaldy Aerodrome (RCAF Station Vulcan)	Vulcan	Alberta
CVL3		Camden East/Varty Lake Aerodrome	Camden East	Ontario
CVL4		Petawawa \ Vermette Landing Water Aerodrome	Petawawa, Ontario (Ottawa River)	Quebec
CVS3		Vancouver (Surrey Memorial Hospital) Heliport	Surrey	British Columbia
CVV2		Valleyview (Health Centre) Heliport	Valleyview	Alberta
CVW2		Vernon/Wildlife Water Aerodrome	Vernon	British Columbia

== CW – Canada – CAN ==
Also see airport category and list.

TC LID	IATA	Airport name	Community	Province or territory
CWB2		Bracebridge West Aerodrome	Bracebridge	Ontario
CWC2		Kelowna (Wildcat Helicopters) Heliport	Kelowna	British Columbia
CWC4		Wetaskiwin (Hospital & Care Centre) Heliport	Wetaskiwin	Alberta
CWD2		Collingwood/Alta Heliport	Collingwood	Ontario
CWD3		Hamilton/Waterdown Heliport	Waterdown	Ontario
CWF2		Walter's Falls (Piper Way) Aerodrome	Walter's Falls	Ontario
CWF3		Mount Brydges/Warren Field Aerodrome	Mount Brydges	Ontario
CWF4		Heathcote/Wilkinson Field Aerodrome	Heathcote	Ontario
CWG2		Winnipeg (City of Winnipeg) Heliport	Winnipeg	Manitoba
CWH3		Woodstock (Hospital) Heliport	Woodstock	Ontario
CWH4		Ottawa (Winchester District Memorial Hospital) Heliport	Winchester	Ontario
CWH5		Wingham (Inglis Field) Aerodrome	Wingham	Ontario
CWH6		Moose Jaw (Dr. F. H. Wigmore Regional Hospital) Heliport	Moose Jaw	Saskatchewan
CWH7		Winnipeg (Health Sciences Centre) Heliport	Winnipeg	Manitoba
CWL2		White Lake Water Aerodrome	White Lake	Ontario
CWL3		Calmar/Wizard Lake Aerodrome	Calmar	Alberta
CWL4		Woodland/Kendall Farm Aerodrome	Woodland	Manitoba
CWP3		Leslieville/W. Pidhirney Residence Heliport	Leslieville	Alberta
CWP4		Paudash Lake (Murray's Landing) Water Aerodrome	Paudash (Paudash Lake)	Ontario
CWP5		Torrence/Walkers Point Aerodrome	Torrance	Ontario
CWR2		Vulcan/Wlid Rose Aerodrome	Vulcan	Alberta

== CX – Canada – CAN ==
Also see airport category and list.

TC LID	IATA	Airport name	Community	Province or territory
CXX2		Wiebenville Aerodrome	Kenora District	Ontario
