= Casa Berardi Mine =

Gold mine in Quebec, Canada

- Location in Canada
- Location: Quebec; 49°34′23.19″N 79°14′13.19″W
- Products: Gold
- Discovered: 1974
- Opened: 1988
- Company: Hecla Mining
- Website: Casa Berardi

The Casa Berardi Mine is a gold mine 95 kilometres (59 mi) north of La Sarre in Quebec, Canada. It is a trackless underground mine with an open-pit component. The mine has provable and probable reserves of 1,542,000 ounces of gold.

In 2016, the East Mine Crown Pillar (EMCP) open-pit began development at a capital cost of $39 million. Development is expected to take 5.5 years. The EMCP pit is the first surface pit of the project.

The mine produces about 2,300 tonnes of ore per day. The site has produced approximately 2 million ounces of gold since opening in 1988.

== See also ==
- List of gold mines in Canada
- Canadian Malartic Mine
- LaRonde mine
- Mount Polley mine
- Meliadine Gold Mine
