= List of ghost towns in the Northwest Territories =

The following is a list of known abandoned communities in the Northwest Territories, Canada. Many of these were "one-resource" towns and were abandoned following the depletion of the resources (usually minerals).

== Abandoned communities ==
- Cameron Bay
- Camp Canol
- Discovery
- Fort Confidence
- Old Fort Providence
- Pine Point
- Port Radium
- Rayrock
- Rocher River
- Tungsten

== See also ==
- List of communities in the Northwest Territories
- Census divisions of the Northwest Territories
