= List of mines in Nunavut =

This is a list of mines in Nunavut, Canada. It includes mines that were operating prior to 1999 in what was then Northwest Territories. Start and end dates set in the future are projected, or "expected".

Mine	Commodities	Coordinates	Associated town	Owner	Start	End	Comments	References
Nanisivik Mine	Zinc, lead	73°02′40″N 084°32′14″W	Nanisivik	Breakwater Resources	1976	2002		
Polaris Mine	Zinc, lead	75°23′24″N 096°54′00″W	Resolute	Cominco	1981	2002	Canada's northernmost mine.	
Lupin Mine	Gold	65°45′N 111°15′W		Echo Bay Mines Limited	1982	2006		
Jericho Mine	Diamond	65°59′50″N 111°28′30″W		Tahera Diamond Corporation	2006	2008		
Meadowbank Mine	Gold	65°01′07″N 096°04′26″W	Baker Lake	Agnico-Eagle Mines	2010			
Mary River Mine	Iron	71°10′59″N 079°21′00″W	Pond Inlet	Baffinland Iron Mine	2014			
Hope Bay Mine	Gold	68°08′14″N 106°36′46″W	Cambridge Bay	TMAQ Resources Inc.	2017			
Amaruq Mine	Gold	65°24′54″N 96°41′49″W	Baker Lake	Agnico-Eagle Mines	2019			
Meliadine Mine	Gold	63°01′58″N 092°13′17″W	Rankin Inlet	Agnico-Eagle Mines	2019	2034		
Qilalugaq Mine	Diamond		Naujaat	North Arrow Minerals				
