= List of people from the Northwest Territories =

Territorial flag of the Northwest Territories

This is a list of notable people who are from the Northwest Territories, Canada, or have spent a large part or formative part of their career in that territory.

== A ==
- Leona Aglukkaq, former member of Parliament for the electoral district of Nunavut
- Roger Allen, former member of the Legislative Assembly of the Northwest Territories

== B ==
- Zac Boyer, former National Hockey League right winger
- Tom Butters, former member of the Legislative Assembly of the Northwest Territories

== C ==
- Mark Carney, 24th Prime Minister of Canada, governor of the Bank of England and former governor of the Bank of Canada

== D ==
- Alex Debogorski, local truck driver and personality on Ice Road Truckers
- Paul Delorey, professional curler and former MLA and speaker in the Northwest Territories Legislature

== E ==
- Jason Elliott, former professional ice hockey player
- Kingmeata Etidlooie, Inuk visual artist and sculptor

== F ==
- Alice Masak French, Inuk author

== G ==
- Brendan Green, Canadian team biathlete; participated in the 2010 Winter Olympics in the men's 4x7.5 km relay
- Jane Groenewegen, former member of the Legislative Assembly of the Northwest Territories from Hay River South
- Leela Gilday, Juno Award-winning Dene singer/songwriter from Yellowknife

== H ==
- Sarah Hardisty, Dene elder and quillworker
- Courtney Howard, Physician and one time leadership candidate, Green Party of Canada

== K ==
- Helen Kalvak, Copper Inuk graphic artist
- Margot Kidder, film and television actress best known for playing Lois Lane in the Superman movies of the 1970s and 1980s
- Fred Koe, former member of the Legislative Assembly of the Northwest Territories
- Kevin Koe, world champion curler
- Shane Koyczan, poet and spoken word artist
- Floyd Kuptana, Inuk sculptor

== M ==
- Joe McBryan (Buffalo Joe), president and owner of Buffalo Airways featured on Ice Pilots NWT
- Mikey McBryan, Buffalo Airways General Manager and featured on Ice Pilots NWT
- Rob McVicar, professional ice hockey goaltender
- Tobias Mehler, film and television actor best known for his roles on Battlestar Galactica and Stargate SG-1
- Vic Mercredi, Métis hockey player, first person born in the NWT to be drafted into the National Hockey League
- Dustin Milligan, film and television actor; lead actor in the first season of the Beverly Hills, 90210 spinoff

== N ==
- Melaw Nakehk'o, Dene artist and film actress, known for role in The Revenant (2015)
- Phoebe Nahanni, Dene geographer
- Agnes Nanogak, Inuk artist
- Leslie Nielsen, actor, comedian, and producer best known for his roles on The Forbidden Planet and The Poseidon Adventure

== P ==
- David Ruben Piqtoukun, Inuk artist and sculptor
- John Pollard, member of the Legislative Assembly of the Northwest Territories from 1987 until 1995

== R ==
- Floyd Roland, Mayor of Inuvik; former Premier and member of the Legislative Assembly of the Northwest Territories

== S ==
- Geoff Sanderson, former National Hockey League player
- Eric Schweig, Inuvialuk/Chippewa/Dene actor
- John Sissons, politician and the first judge of the Supreme Court of the Northwest Territories
- Donald Morton Stewart, former mayor and speaker of the Northwest Territories Legislature
- Les Stroud, filmmaker and survival expert; host of the television program Survivorman

== T ==
- Ovilu Tunnillie, Inuk sculptor, member of the Royal Canadian Academy of Arts

== V ==
- Greg Vaydik, National Hockey League player

== W ==
- Max Ward, pioneering bush pilot and founder of Wardair airlines (later sold to Canadian Airlines)

== See also ==
- List of writers from the Canadian territories
