= Defot =

- Location of Defot in British Columbia
- Coordinates: 58°54′00″N 130°27′00″W
- Country: Canada
- Province: British Columbia
- Area codes: 250, 778

Defot is a locality and former mining boomtown in the Cassiar Country of the Northern Interior of British Columbia, Canada, located west of Mount Defot.

In the 1870s, exploration of the region north of the Stikine basin accelerated into the Cassiar Gold Rush with the discovery of gold at McDame Creek (aka Fort McDame - see Harry McDame), downstream from Dease Lake in 1871. Defot was one of the many boomtowns and mining camps in the region that sprang up around the region.

== Name origin ==
Defot, Defot Creek and Mount Defot are named for an early prospector.

== Defot Creek Mine ==
Gold was first discovered in Defot Creek in 1876, 23 kilometres northwest of Porter Landing, which is at the outlet of Dease Lake. The mine was most productive in 1878. Records show that 359,174 grams of gold were taken by the Defot Mine from 1880 to 1915, with 90% of the total in the four years, from 1886 to 1890. The precise location of the mine is 58°53′59″N 130°26′24″W.
