= Phoebe Nahanni =

Dene geographer

- Born: January 17, 1947; Near Jean Marie River
- Died: May 14, 2001 (aged 54); Almonte, Ontario
- Citizenship: Slavey-Dene
- Education: University of Western Ontario; McGill University
- Occupations: Geographer; Cartographer; Dene land claims advocate

Phoebe Rose Nahanni (January 17, 1947 – May 14, 2001) was a Slavey-Dene geographer and cartographer. She played a central role in the Dene Nation mapping project, which constructed a map of how the Dene Nation actively used about 450,000 square miles of land. This information was one of the factors in the Mackenzie Valley Pipeline Inquiry's recommendation not to construct a pipeline through the Mackenzie River Valley. Nahanni was also active in the social scientific study of arctic and subarctic communities, and is thought to have been the first Slavey-Dene woman to hold a master's degree.

== Life and career ==
Nahanni was born on January 17, 1947, near Jean Marie River in the Northwest Territories. She attended the University of Western Ontario, making her one of the first Dene people to attend university, and she graduated with a degree in geography in 1972. Geography was a particularly relevant topic of study because of the active land claims disputes that Dene people were undergoing. While she was an undergraduate, Nahanni took a leading role in an early experiment with distance education to try to make higher education more accessible in the north. Nahanni and a group of students worked with members of the Computer Science Department at the University of Western Ontario to experiment with developing a microwave communications network to create a "university of the air" that could be accessed from the Arctic. The historian Amanda Graham credits Nahanni with challenging academics to take up this project in a university seminar in 1969.

After completing her geography studies, Nahanni worked on the Dene Nation mapping project. The goal of this project was to document the extensive activity of the Dene people on the land they inhabited, to create a thorough record of the historical and contemporary use of the land by the Dene, with a particular eye towards using this information in negotiations over land. To that end, Nahanni was an original signer of the Dene Declaration of self-determination, and she led a team of 20 Dene researchers to interview 546 people about their practices on the land. This information was used in the Mackenzie Valley Pipeline Inquiry over whether or not a pipeline should be built in the Mackenzie River Valley. Nahanni used the hundreds of interviews and the detailed maps that her team had produced to argue that the Dene people owned and actively relied on 450,000 square miles of land, which the proposed pipeline would infringe on and likely damage.

Nahanni returned to the academic study of geography in 1985, and in 1992 she graduated from McGill University with an M.A. in geography. Her thesis was entitled Dene women in the traditional and modern northern economy in Denendeh, Northwest Territories, Canada. This degree may have made Nahanni the first Slavey-Dene woman to obtain a master's degree. She continued to research and publish her work, and remained connected to the community of social scientists studying arctic and subarctic regions. For example, she contributed a chapter to the 1990 book Gossip: A Spoken History of Women in the North, and she was a coauthor of the 1993 book Social Sciences in the North. She also appeared frequently at academic conferences. For example, Nahanni was a specialist at The Man in the North Conference on Community Development in Inuvik in 1970. Nahanni was also the first keynote speaker invited to the First International Congress of Arctic Social Sciences, at Université Laval in 1992.

Nahanni was the first Research Director of The Indian Brotherhood, an organization based in the Northwest Territories. She was also a Director of the Original Peoples Library Association.

Nahanni was married to Ronald Pokrupa, and had 3 children. She died at Almonte, Ontario on May 14, 2001, though her place of death has also been given as Montreal.

After Nahanni's death, the Dehcho First Nations endowed the Phoebe Nahanni Memorial Scholarship, which, as of 2020, awards $12,000 annually to "Dehcho Dene descendants pursuing a doctorate, masters or undergraduate degree in the natural sciences, law or political science".

== Selected work ==
- Towards a Developmental Land Settlement in the N.W.T. (1974)
- "Women in the Workplace: Dene Women and Work", in Gossip : A Spoken History of Women in the North (1990)
- Social Sciences in the North, coauthor (1993)
