= Negus Mine =

Mine in Yellowknife, Northwest Territories, Canada

Coordinates: 62°26′10″N 114°21′00″W

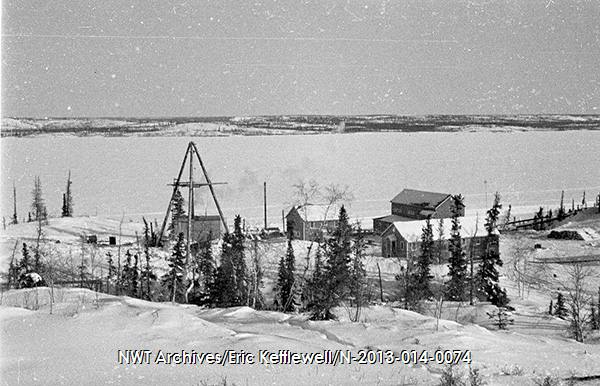
Negus Mine

Negus Mine was a gold producer at Yellowknife, Northwest Territories, Canada, from 1939 to 1952. It produced 255,807 troy ounces (7,956.5 kg) of gold from 490,808 tons of ore milled. The underground workings were acquired by adjacent Con Mine in 1953 and were used for ventilation purposes until Con Mine closed in 2003.
