= Ogden, British Columbia =

Coordinates: 50.789°N 122.826°W

Ogden is an unincorporated locality on the outskirts of the gold-mining ghost town of Bralorne, British Columbia, Canada. Now mostly abandoned, Ogden was once a bustling centre of commercial activities not tolerated in the company-run town, many of its establishments built on the highway easement or small parcels of steep mountainside flanking the road. Among these were Zada's "sporting house" (where sewing was taken in for bachelor miners), which once suffered a small landslide through the main parlour but was back in operation soon after, and the once-famous Mines Hotel, known in the mining industry as "the main stope", which featured a miniature mining operation atop its gold-ore fireplace mantel. The first two versions of the Mines Hotel burned down soon after they were built, and the third, which stood until 1984 when it was destroyed by a furnace explosion, was built in a plain boxy style very different from the original alpine-timber design. Ogden's heyday faded long before Bralorne closed, and only a few buildings survive other than a few houses. Ogden remains on the official listing of localities in British Columbia, and is used by locals as a reference to the general area where the "town" of Ogden had been.
