= Defot Creek =

Creek in British Columbia, Canada

Coordinates: 58°55′3″N 130°27′44″W

Defot Creek is a creek located in the Stikine Region of British Columbia. The creek is a tributary of the west fork of the Canyon River. Defot Creek is located north west of Dease Lake. The creek came to prominence when John Defot discovered gold there in 1878. Two hundred miners moved into the region and created a camp called Defot. Defot was mined using wing damming and sluicing. By 1880 fewer than 40 miners remained at the creek as the gold supply dwindled.
