= Catcha Lake =

Lake in Nova Scotia, Canada

- Location within Nova Scotia
- Location: Halifax Regional Municipality, Nova Scotia
- Coordinates: 44°44′09″N 63°11′40″W
- Basin countries: Canada

Catcha Lake is a Canadian lake located in the central part of Nova Scotia's Halifax Regional Municipality.

Catcha Lake in Nova Scotia

== Gold mining ==
Gold was discovered at Catcha Lake and was produced beginning in 1882 according to records by E Gilpin, according to a report to Charles E Church, Commissioner of Public Works And Mines (dated June 20, 1898). The report indicated that 20,734 tons of ore had been crushed to date, resulting in the recovery of 22,757 ounces of gold valued at that time at $19.00 per ton WJW.

Today the Acadian Gold Corporation controls approximately 6.4 kilometres of strike length on this structure and is planning to drill for samples in the future .
