= Burwash Mine =

Gold mine in Northwest Territories, Canada

Coordinates: 62°27′45″N 114°19′00″W

- Burwash Mine Burwash Mine (Canada)
- Location: Yellowknife, Northwest Territories, Canada
- Products: Gold
- Discovered: 1934
- Opened: 1935
- Closed: 1936

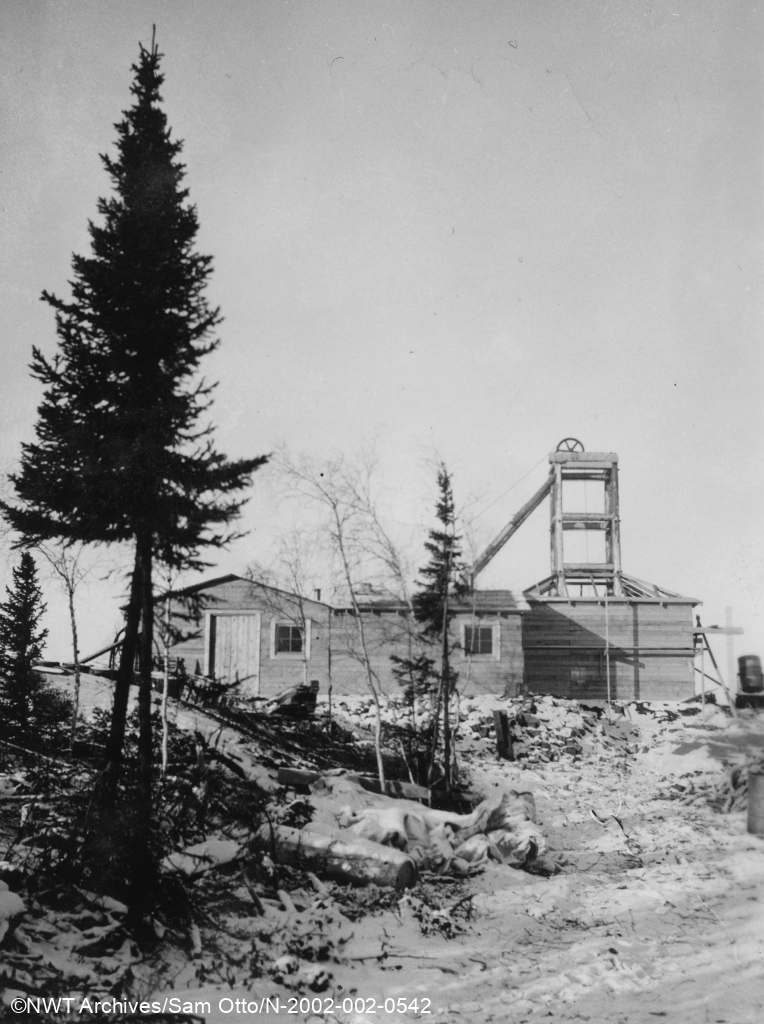
Shaft headframe

The Burwash Mine was a small gold property discovered in the fall of 1934 by Johnny Baker and Hugh Muir at Yellowknife Bay, Northwest Territories. The town of Yellowknife did not exist yet at that point, but the discovery of gold at Burwash was the catalyst that brought more gold prospectors into the region in 1935 and 1936. A short shaft was sunk in 1935–1936 at Burwash, and in the summer of 1935 a 16-ton bulk sample of ore was shipped to Trail, British Columbia for processing, yielding 200 troy ounces (6.2 kg) of gold. The mine did not become a substantial producer and it is believed the gold vein was mined out.

The Burwash Mine has some historical significance in that the original ore sample kept "gold fever" alive in the area and helped in the establishment of Yellowknife as a viable northern community.
