= Beaulieu Mine =

Mine in Northwest Territories, Canada

Coordinates: 62°25′03″N 112°54′09″W

The Beaulieu Mine was a post-World War II gold mining operation near Yellowknife, Northwest Territories. It entered production in October 1947 but by the end of November only 7 ounces (200 grams) of rough gold were recovered. Additional gold was recovered during 1948, but the mine recovered only 30 troy ounces (930 g) of fine gold altogether. The operation folded in chaos and bankruptcy.
