= Ruth Mine =

Gold mine in Northwest Territories, Canada

Coordinates: 62°27′44″N 112°34′23″W

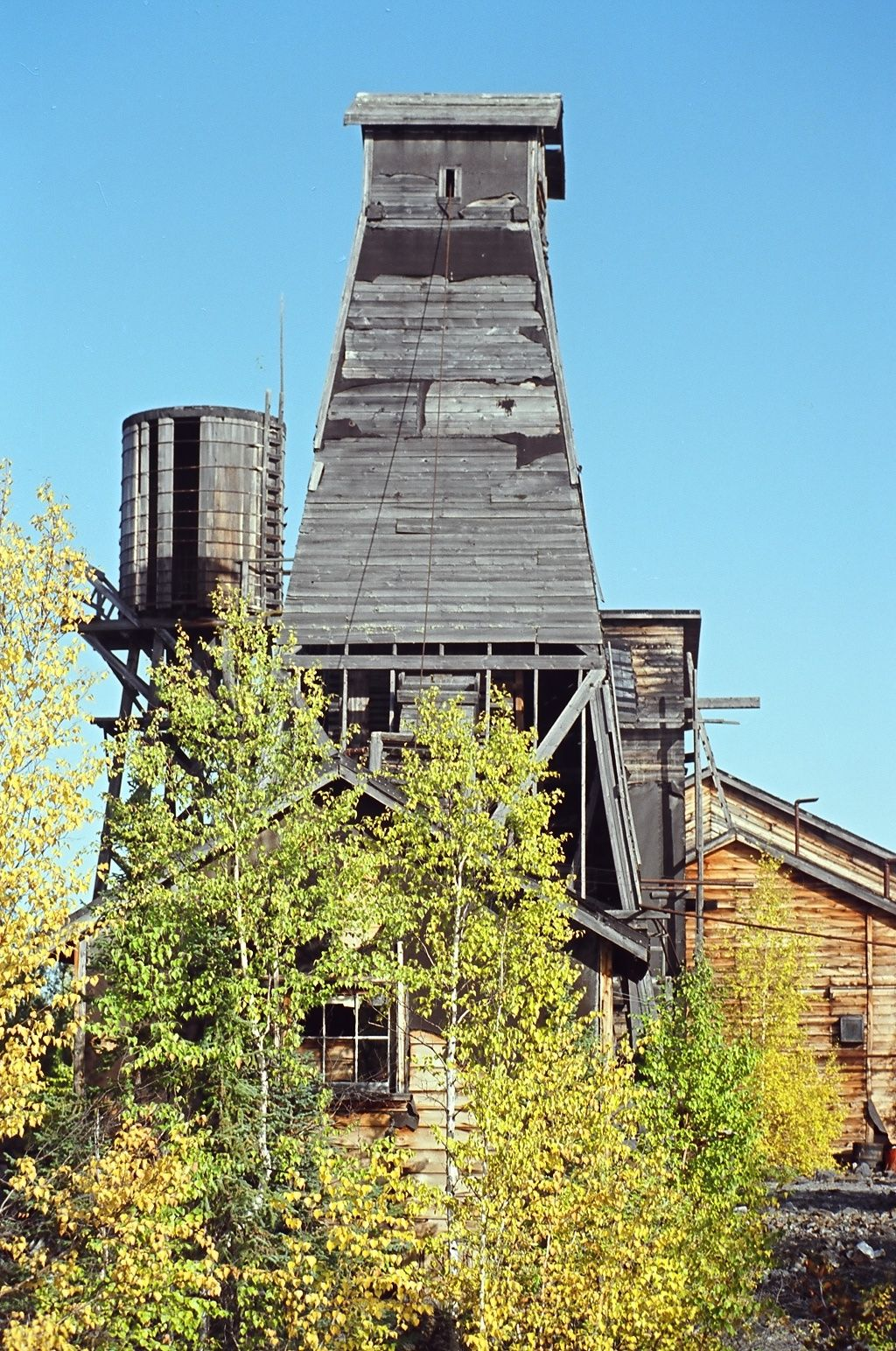
Ruth mine in 1995

The Ruth Mine was a small gold producer about 65 kilometres (40 mi) east of Yellowknife, Northwest Territories. It operated briefly during 1942 and resumed operations in 1959, extracting to date 550 troy ounces (17 kg) of gold.

As of 2012, the old mine was significant as one of the last intact abandoned mining properties from the 1940s in the Northwest Territories. The site was scheduled to be restored by the federal government. However, a wildfire in July 2014 burned its remaining buildings to the ground.
