= Camlaren Mine =

Gold mine in the Northwest Territories, Canada

Coordinates: 62°59′12″N 113°12′17″W

The Camlaren Mine was a small gold mine 80 km (50 mi) north-east of Yellowknife, Northwest Territories, Canada, at Gordon Lake. It consists of a property totaling about 981 hectares. The two claims that make up the property were staked in 1936 by prospectors Don Cameron and the Mclaren brothers and developed with two shafts during 1937–1938. The name "Camlaren" is a portmanteau of Cameron and McLaren. Conditions attributed to World War II halted development at Camlaren in 1939.

The mine did not produce any gold until 1963 when more modernized mining methods were introduced. About 11,000 tons of ore were transported to Discovery Mine for processing, resulting in about 15,000 troy ounces (466.6 kg) of refined gold.

In 1980, Mining Corporation of Canada Limited erected a milling plant at Camlaren and produced another 20,000 troy ounces (622.1 kg) of gold in the next two years. There are two other potential production sites on the property that have not been developed.

- H-Vein: About 0.5 km (0.31 mi) west of the main site.
- #31-Vein: About 3 km (1.9 mi) southwest of the main site.

During its two operational periods, the mine has produced about 36,661 troy ounces (1,140 kg) of gold from 64,137 tons of ore. Infrastructure was demolished in 1991 and only the old chimney from the 1937 mine manager's house remains.

The Camlaren property is now part of the Gordon Lake Project.
