= Ptarmigan and Tom Mine =

Gold mines at Yellowknife, Northwest Territories, Canada

The Ptarmigan and Tom Mine were gold producers located in the Northwest Territories, Canada at Yellowknife. The property was staked by prospectors in 1936 and acquired by Cominco in 1938. The mine first produced between 1941 and 1942 but closed due to wartime restrictions. The old property was demolished in 1969–1970. A new company, Treminco Resources Limited, reopened the workings in 1985 and production from the Tom (62°31′57″N 114°11′41″W) portal began in 1986 with material being trucked to Giant Mine. The old Ptarmigan (62°31′15″N 114°11′45″W) mine shaft was dewatered and production began in 1987. A new mill was built at the property and was operational in July 1989. Low gold prices forced the company to close the mines in 1997. Total gold production has been approximately 120,000 troy ounces (130,000 oz; 3,700,000 g).

On February 2, 2010, Trivello Energy Corp., a publicly traded company on the TSX Venture Exchange in Canada under the trading symbol "TRV", announced it had acquired the Tom Gold Mine project including five claims of approximately 650 acres (260 ha).

Trivello Energy Corp. changed its name to Equitas Resources Corp. and trades on the TSX Venture Exchange under the trading symbol "EQT".
