= Canadian Malartic Mine =

Gold mine in Quebec, Canada

- Location in Canada
- Location: Quebec, Canada; 48°6′42.33″N 78°7′53.91″W
- Products: Gold
- Discovered: 1923
- Opened: 2011
- Company: Agnico-Eagle Mines
- Website: Canadian Malartic Mine
- Acquired: 2014

The Canadian Malartic Mine is a gold mine 25 kilometres (16 mi) west of Val-d'Or in Quebec, Canada.

The mineral deposit was discovered in 1923 and Osisko Mining began commercial mining operations in 2011. The mine came under equal ownership of Agnico-Eagle Mines and Yamana Gold in June 2014.

It is expected that the mine will continue operations at the Malartic and Barnat pits through until 2029 while the new Odyssey site will continue until 2039.
