= Salmita Mine =

Gold mine in Northwest Territories, Canada

- Interactive map of Salmita Mine
- Location: Northwest Territories, Canada; 64°04′45″N 111°14′45″W
- Opened: 1983
- Closed: 1987
- Company: Giant Yellowknife Mines Limited, a subsidiary of Falconbridge

The Salmita Mine was a gold producer in the Northwest Territories, Canada during 1983 to 1987. The deposit was first discovered in 1945 and underground exploration was carried out in 1951–1952. It was reactivated for exploration by Giant Yellowknife Mines Limited in 1975 and entered production in 1983. They used the old camp and milling plant of the abandoned Tundra Mine, located a few kilometres to the south. The mine produced 179,906 troy ounces (5,595.7 kg) of gold from the milling of 238,177 tons of ore. The area is now owned by Seabridge Gold.
