= Thompson-Lundmark Mine =

Gold mine in Northwest Territories, Canada

- Location in Canada
- Location: Northwest Territories, Canada; 62°36′43.2″N 113°28′26.4″W
- Products: Gold, Silver
- Discovered: 1938
- Opened: 1939
- Closed: 1949

The Thompson-Lundmark Mine was a gold producer in the periods 1941–1943 and 1947–1949, near Yellowknife, Northwest Territories. Gold was discovered here in 1938 by Fred W. Thompson and Roy Lundmark, who staked 46 claims which were incorporated into the mine. Underground and shaft work began in 1939. The mine processed 133,989 tons of ore to produce 70,339 troy ounces (2,187.8 kg) of gold and 13,782 troy ounces (428.7 kg) of silver. The abandoned site was destroyed by forest fires during 1998.
