= Outpost Island Mine =

Mine in Northwest Territories, Canada

Coordinates: 61.7358°N 113.4589°W

The Outpost Island Mine was a gold and tungsten producer 94 kilometres southeast of Yellowknife, Northwest Territories on an island of Great Slave Lake. Gold was discovered here in 1935 by prospectors, and some development was undertaken in 1936–1938. Tungsten ores became valuable during World War II, so the owners (Slave Lake Gold Mines Limited) investigated the tungsten possibilities of the mine. It produced small amounts of gold, copper, and tungsten during 1941–1942, and then again in 1951-1952 during the Korean War. It was a small deposit and was not considered economic because of unpredictable tungsten market prices in the 1950s.
