= Colomac Mine =

Gold mine in the Northwest Territories in Canada

- Location in Canada
- Location: Northwest Territories, Canada; 64°24′N 115°06′W
- Opened: 1990
- Closed: 1997
- Company: Government of Canada
- Acquired: 1997

Colomac Mine was a privately owned and operated open pit gold mine located 200 kilometres (120 miles) northwest of Yellowknife in the Northwest Territories, Canada. It operated between 1990–1992, and 1994–1997. It was operated by Neptune Resources Limited, which had little success in making a profit during its operation. In 1994, the mine had reopened under Royal Oak Mines Inc. Both Neptune Resources and Royal Oak Mines were both owned and operated by Peggy Witte.

Due to low gold prices and high cost of mining, Royal Oak Mines was forced into bankruptcy. The Government of Canada became owners of the mine, along with the related environmental issues. A major cleanup effort was completed to prevent the mine from polluting the environment.

On 26 January 2012, Nighthawk Gold Corporation completed an agreement to acquire 100% of the mineral claims and leases of the former producing Colomac Gold Mine and surrounding mineral leases (Colomac Property), from then Aboriginal Affairs and Northern Development Canada (AANDC) now Crown–Indigenous Relations and Northern Affairs Canada (CCIRNAC). The Colomac Property lies within the central portion of Nighthawk Gold's 930 square kilometres (360 square miles) property. Nighthawk Gold has since been responsibly exploring and advancing the Colomac Gold Project with the goal to restart gold mining operations in the future, assuming positive economics and the receipt of operating permits.

== Production ==
The Colomac Mine processed a total of almost 12,300 metric tons (12,100 long tons; 13,600 short tons) of ore, and produced 16.7 metric tons (540,000 troy ounces) of gold, with an approximate value of $916 million. This figure is based on 2012 gold prices, averaging close to USD $55,000 per kg.

In April 2007, Indian and Northern Affairs Canada engaged the professional services company Deloitte & Touche LLP to become their solicitor, in order to find another independently-owned and -operated company to acquire the idle mine as well as the resources on the land it occupied. To generate interest, they featured the mine as holding 6,600,000 t (6,500,000 long tons; 7,300,000 short tons) of untapped resources, a gold processing mill and related equipment, a maintenance building, a dorm room styled housing complex, power and fuel storage facilities, and mobile equipment (rock trucks, excavators and loaders). It was also featured on the popular reality television show Ice Road Truckers.

== Cleanup ==
After being shut down in 1997 and abandoned shortly after by Royal Oak Mines, it transferred into the Government of Canada's hands and responsibility in mid-December 1999. In accordance with water licensing laws and regulations in Canada, Royal Oak Mines had posted a CA$1.5 million security deposit and in 1999 they were charged with cyanide dumping by the Government of Canada. The government of Canada had estimated the cost of the cleanup at CA$70 million due to high levels of cyanide and ammonia content, as well as acid mine drainage.

For the people of Indin Lake the tailing pond owned by the mine was at one stage threatening to overflow unless immediate action was taken to prevent a disastrous environmental impact. A public hearing was called to cancel the mine's license and to begin a cleanup.

In 1999, the Department of Indian Affairs and Northern Development (DIAND) awarded a one-year, CA$2 million contract to a consortium of Indigenous businesses from DetonÇho Corporation, the Dogrib Rae Band and the North Slave Métis Alliance to undertake final reclamation activities at the Colomac Mine. The consortium conducted studies into contamination and took responsibility for on-going environmental monitoring and maintenance of the site. After the contract was awarded, Royal Oak Mine was finally charged under the Water Act and the Fisheries Act for the pollution it had caused, this was much too late, since the company was already in receivership.

According to MiningWatch Canada in a 2001 publication:

Now, the water license has not been changed, the money needed to clean-up the site is not forthcoming, and the Dogribs are faced with a potential catastrophe if the tailings pond overflows. Says Dogrib leader Ted Blondin: "I think there is a fiduciary responsibility that the federal government has to looking after the Dogrib interests, and these are the arguments that we will use towards ensuring that the quality of water and the work that has to be done for the cleanup is done.

— MiningWatch Canada

During the initial cleanup phase, many new and effective remediation procedures were developed and put into place, including the use of farmed micro-organisms to remove hydrocarbons from soil contaminated by poor management of the fuel tank farm located on site.

On 25 February 2010, a CA$19 million contract was awarded to two Indigenous firms, Tlicho Engineering/Environmental Services Ltd and Aboriginal Engineering Ltd for a final two year remediation contract, which will also create local jobs in the area. According to Aboriginal Affairs and Northern Development Canada this two year remediation will cover:

final remediation of the site, including: major demolition activities (primary and secondary crushing facilities, mill complex, maintenance shop and camp); hydrocarbon remediation (restoration of Steeve's Lake shoreline, free product recovery and soil treatment); site restoration (Truck Lake channel construction, stream crossing restoration) and capping of the non-hazardous landfill sites as well as continued provision of site services and maintenance. The contract, which follows a competitive process, will last until April of 2012 when the companies will conduct a full and final demobilization of the site.

In May 2010, officials suspended the remediation project due to an accident, which occurred at the mine in April 2010. It occurred after a foreman working for Aboriginal Engineering Ltd suffered leg injuries after a 2.5 centimetres (0.98 inches) cable snapped. Human Resources and Skills Canada announced in May 2010 that they would not allow this remediation to continue until Aboriginal Engineering Ltd set out to implement the standards for health and safety set out by the Federal Government in relation to this type of task.
