= Meliadine Gold Mine =

Gold mine in Nunavut, Canada

- Location in Canada
- Location: Nunavut, Canada; 63°1′55.29″N 92°13′15.84″W
- Products: Gold
- Opened: 2019
- Company: Agnico-Eagle Mines
- Website: Meliadine

The Meliadine Gold Mine is a gold mine near Rankin Inlet in the Kivalliq district of Nunavut, Canada. It is expected that the mine will have two underground components and ten open pits. The mine is operated by Agnico-Eagle Mines and is projected to be in operation until 2032.

Commercial operation on site began May 14, 2019. The main camp of the mining site can accommodate 700 workers. A 31.3 megawatt diesel-fueled powerplant has been constructed for electricity and heating. Among other mining infrastructure facilities to be constructed, the site will include a tailings storage facility, a wastewater treatment plant, and an industrial incinerator.

In March 2021, a report commissioned by Agnico-Eagle found that the mining road to Meliadine is having "virtually no impact" on migrating caribou. The report was met with skepticism by the Kivalliq Inuit Association (KIA), which commissioned its own report alleging that the scope of the study was "narrow and unrealistic".
