= Con Mine =

Gold mine in the Northwest Territories, Canada

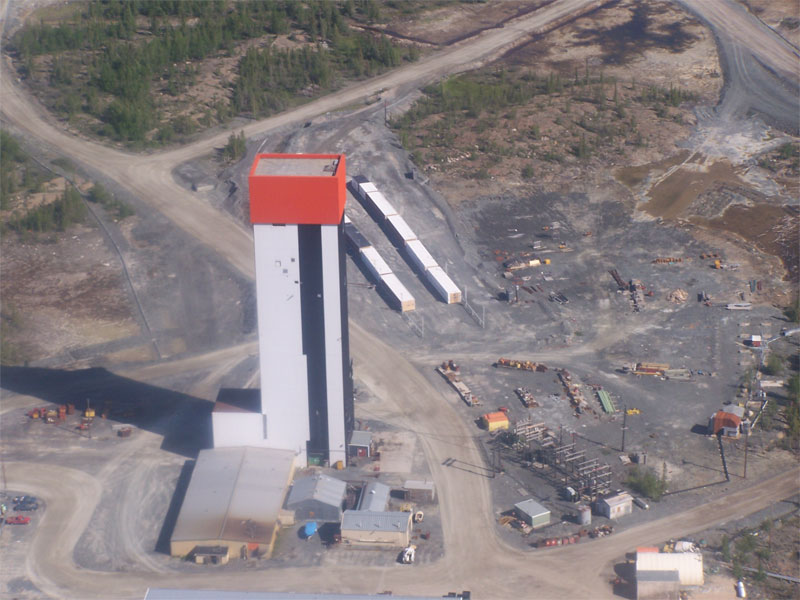
- The Robertson Shaft headframe at the Con Mine was built in 1977 and measured 76 m (249 ft) in height. It was the tallest building in the Northwest Territories.

- Location in Canada

Location
- Location: Northwest Territories, Canada; 62°26′20″N 114°22′18″W

History
- Opened: 1938
- Closed: 2003

Owner
- Company: Newmont Mining Corporation
- Acquired: 2008

The Con Mine (1938–2003) was the first gold mine developed in the Northwest Territories, Canada, just south of Yellowknife. The property was staked by Consolidated Mining and Smelting Company of Canada (Cominco) in September 1935 in response to the discovery of visible gold nearby; the name "Con" is an abbreviation of "Consolidated". The advent of winter prevented any prospecting from being conducted, but work in the summer of 1936 led to the discovery of numerous gold veins. The Con Mine entered production in 1938 and ceased operations in 2003. It has produced over 5,000,000 ozt (160,000 kg) of gold from 12,195,585 tons of ore processed. The mine was over 6,000 ft (1,800 m) deep.

Owners of the mine have included Cominco (1938–1986), Nerco Minerals (1986–1993), Miramar Mining Corp. (1993–2008), and Newmont Mining Corp. (2008–present).

Geologically, the Con Mine is located within the Kam Group which is part of the Yellowknife greenstone belt.

== Social history ==
The first gold brick was poured on September 5, 1938. A wave of settlers and workers moved North and Yellowknife was established. The company had to build a living environment for its workers. The company built a number of dwellings for families while single men stayed in long bunkhouses and ate in a cookhouse. The homes for management were located on the lakefront. There were also recreation facilities provided such as a bowling alley. Along with hosting regular dances and parties, the Con recreation Hall included a library of books donated by the Edmonton library. Garden plots were also provided where families could grow vegetables.

As people left the mines to join the war effort, the Con Mine closed between 1943 and 1946 and the economy of Yellowknife nearly collapsed. The Con Mine was the first mine to welcome immigrant workers (1951). The immigrants who came to work at the mine were primarily from Italy, although there were workers attracted to the prospects of work drawn from across Europe. They often learned to speak English with the help of the nuns at the local church.

There was a vibrant hockey league after the war with teams being sponsored by various mines and businesses. The Con Mine team was named the Cougars. Workers were often recruited and hired on the basis of their talent to play hockey. The mining companies contributed to the maintenance of the local arena.

In 1954, the Con Mine was visited by the Prince Philip, Duke of Edinburgh. This began a long line of visits to the mine in which Canada showcased its gold mine in the sub-arctic. Other Royal visits have included Queen Elizabeth (1970) and her son Prince Charles (1975).

An increase in gold prices in the 1970s led to the expansion of the Con Mine, including a deep new shaft. In 1975, the first women began to enter work in the Mines.

As Yellowknife developed and became more accessible by road to the Con Mine, workers and their families began to access facilities and eventually live in the city and the "Con Camp" declined until it was razed in the 1980s. After the closure of the Mine in 2003, the mine itself was reduced to rubble and concrete.

== Future prospects ==
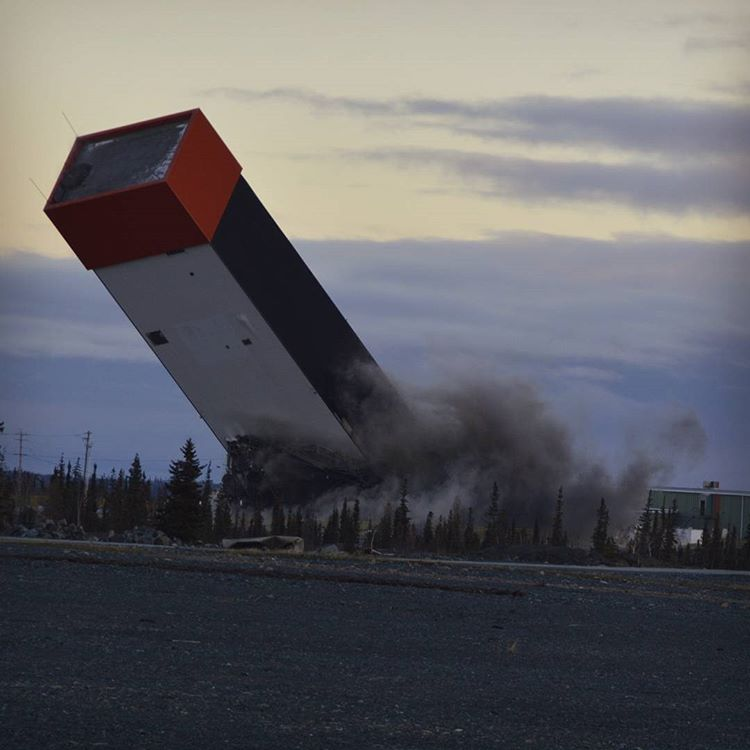
Demolition of the headframe at Con Mine in 2016.

The defunct mine's deep shafts posed the possibility of extracting geothermal energy for heat generation free of greenhouse gases. The mine has the potential to heat half of the city of Yellowknife. A Memorandum of Understanding signed between the City of Yellowknife and Corix Utilities in June 2011 gave new impetus to the project. After a referendum voted against the geothermal plan in 2011 it was abandoned by the City.

Hopes of preserving the iconic Robertson headframe sitting over the shaft were dashed when the City's Development Appeal Board dismissed a final appeal by prospector Walt Humphries to delay planned demolition. "Miramar Northern Mining, the company that is remediating the Con site, says it plans to begin the demolition right away."

At 4:50 PM on October 29, 2016, demolition commenced bringing down the headframe.
