= Discovery Mine =

Gold mine in the Northwest Territories, Canada

Coordinates: 63.1874°N 113.8968°W

Location
- Location: Yellowknife, Northwest Territories, Canada

History
- Discovered: 1944
- Opened: 1950
- Closed: 1969

Owner
- Company: GoldMining Inc.
- Website: www.goldmining.com
- Acquired: 2003

The Discovery Mine was a gold mine 84 kilometers northeast (approx bearing of 15 degrees) of Yellowknife, Northwest Territories that operated between 1950 and 1969. Gold was discovered here by Alfred Giauque in 1944. A complete townsite, on Giauque Lake, was established by the company to house workers and their families. The mine produced one million troy ounces (31,000 kg) of gold from one million tons of ore. The abandoned townsite, not accessible by road, was demolished in 2005.

Discovery Mine was serviced by air and had an unpaved airstrip to fly people and supplies in and out. After the mine was abandoned, the airstrip was often used by flying instructors from Yellowknife to teach their students emergency landing procedures on abandoned airstrips. As late as the early 1980s, the airstrip was in sufficiently good shape to use, with only a few potholes even after more than ten years. An aerial view of the lake at that time showed it to be crystal clear, with an unobstructed view to the rocky bottom and a beautiful blue colour. A tailings spill in the early 1960s deposited contaminated waste into the Lake. The short-life cyanide was undetectable within a few years, but the residual mercury remained in the sediment and entered the food chain. Declining concentrations of mercury in the fish since 1975 has occurred as the contaminated wastes are naturally buried. Clean-up of the townsite and tailings concluded in 2005 with no detectable contaminants in Giauque Lake water. Continuous monitoring since then continues to report no detectable contamination of the waters.

Additional mineralization discovered in 1994 led to renewed development of the area. Tyhee Development Corp of Vancouver, B.C. planned to exploit the over 1 million ounces of gold identified on site. In 2010 Tyhee (renamed Tyhee Gold Corp) completed a Preliminary Feasibility Study reporting 2.2 million ounces of gold in five zones, two of which are contiguous with the Discovery Mine. In 2011 Tyhee advanced their permitting of a new mine to the Developers Assessment Report stage of the Mackenzie Valley Environmental Impact Review process. A Feasibility Study completed in 2012 reported positive economics from a combined mining operation exploiting Reserves identified on the Discovery Mine Property, and two other satellite zones. A central milling site at the Discovery Mine was proposed. Tyhee became insolvent and in 2017 they voluntarily entered receivership and all of its assets were purchased by GoldMining Inc. of Vancouver.
