= Tundra Mine =

Gold mine in the Northwest Territories, Canada

- Location in Canada
- Location: Northwest Territories, Canada; 64°03′26.0″N 111°10′34.0″W
- Products: Gold
- Opened: 1962
- Closed: 1968
- Company: Royal Oak Mines Inc.

The Tundra Mine was a gold mine that operated in the Northwest Territories of Canada between 1962 and 1968. During that time, the site produced 104,476 troy ounces (3,249.6 kg) of gold, from 187,714 tons of ore. The site briefly reopened in the 1980s before being closed permanently.

In 1999, the site's ownership was transferred to the Canadian government after the company that operated the mine went under. Indian and Northern Affairs Canada has a project to remediate the Tundra Mine site under their Northern Contaminants Program, funded by the Canadian Federal Contaminated Sites Action Plan.

In 2018, the Canadian government had cleared all the remaining ore residue at the site. At the time, the reported cost of the cleanup was $110 million.
