= List of mayors of Yellowknife =

This is a list of mayors of Yellowknife, Northwest Territories, Canada

== List ==
- Jock McNiven 1953–1954
- Gordon A. Allen 1954–1955
- Fred W. Henne 1956–1957
- Ted Horton 1958–1963
- John Parker 1964 – February 1967
- C. M. "Chet" Wilkinson March – December 1967
- Fred W. Henne 1968–1973
- Robert M. Findlay 1974–1975
- Fred W. Henne 1976–1979
- Michael Ballantyne 1980–1983
- Don Sian 1984–1985
- Michael McGrath 1986–1987
- Pat McMahon 1988–1994
- David Lovell 1994–2000
- Gordon Van Tighem 2000–2012
- Mark Heyck 2012–2018
- Rebecca Alty 2018–2025
- Ben Hendriksen 2025–2026
- Melissa Syer 2026–present

== Election results ==
=== 2026 ===
Mayoral candidate	Vote	%
Melissa Syer	4,041	73.17
Garett Cochrane	1,482	26.83

=== 2022 ===
Mayoral candidate	Vote	%
Rebecca Alty	Acclaimed	

=== 2018 ===
Mayoral candidate	Vote	%
Rebecca Alty	2,938	54.99
Adrian Bell	2,210	41.36
Bob Stewart	102	1.91
Jerald Sibbeston	93	1.74

=== 2015 ===
Mayoral candidate	Vote	%
Mark Heyck	4,479	76.04
John Himmelman	1,411	23.96

=== 2012 ===
Mayoral candidate	Vote	%
Mark Heyck	2,008	46.82
Tim Doyle	1,465	34.16
Paul Falvo	816	19.03

=== 2009 ===
Mayoral candidate	Vote	%
Gordon Van Tighem	2,497	73.77
Bryan Sutherland	592	17.49
John Westergreen	296	8.74

=== 2006 ===
Mayoral candidate	Vote	%
Gordon Van Tighem	Acclaimed	

=== 2003 ===
Mayoral candidate	Vote	%
Gordon Van Tighem	Acclaimed	

=== 2000 ===
Mayoral candidate	Vote	%
Gordon Van Tighem	1,555	37.47
Bob Brooks	1,355	32.65
David Lovell	899	21.66
Cheryl Best	341	8.22
