= Matt Berry (disambiguation) =

Matt Berry (born 1974) is an English actor and musician.

Matt Berry may also refer to:

== People ==
- Matthew Berry (born 1969), American sports analyst and writer
- Matthew Berry (politician) (born 1972), American lawyer and Congressional candidate
- Arthur Massey Berry (1888–1970), Canadian bush plane pilot

== Places ==
- Matt Berry, Edmonton, a Canadian neighbourhood

== See also ==
- Matt Barrie (disambiguation)
