= Eugène Rhéaume =

Canadian politician, insurance agent, and social worker

Member of Parliament for Northwest Territories
- In office 1963–1965
- Preceded by: Isabel Hardie
- Succeeded by: Robert Orange

Personal details
- Born: December 3, 1932 High Prairie, Alberta
- Died: November 1, 2013 (aged 80) Penticton, British Columbia
- Party: Progressive Conservative
- Profession: Administrator, insurance agent, social worker

Eugène "Gene" Rhéaume (December 3, 1932 – November 1, 2013) was a politician, insurance agent, and social worker from Northwest Territories, Canada.

== Life ==
Born in High Prairie, Alberta, he was the eighth of nine children. Their father was French-Canadian and their mother was of Scottish, Ojibwa, and Métis heritage. Rhéaume studied English at the University of Saskatchewan, obtaining a BA in 1953, and later received a social work degree after working in that field for a time. He married Helen Gessler in 1954. They had six children between 1955 and 1963. They were married 37 years, then, following a divorce, Rhéaume's partner for 15 years until his death was Margaret Jones of Okanagan Falls, British Columbia.

Rhéaume first ran for the House of Commons of Canada in the 1962 Canadian federal election against Isabel Hardie; he lost the hotly contested election by only 300 votes. He faced Hardie again just a year later in the 1963 Canadian federal election, this time defeating her.

Rhéaume served in the House of Commons for one term, before getting defeated himself in the 1965 Canadian federal election by Robert Orange. He was the PC candidate in the 1974 Canadian federal election running in the Saskatoon—Humboldt electoral district in Saskatchewan; he was defeated by incumbent Otto Lang.

Rhéaume died on November 1, 2013, from complications related to cancer surgery.

He was the grandfather of singer-songwriter Amanda Rheaume.

== Electoral history ==
1963 Canadian federal election: Northwest Territories
Party	Candidate	Votes	%	±%
Progressive Conservative	Eugène Rhéaume	4,814	56.82	+14.47
Liberal	Isabel Hardie	3,659	43.18	–3.06
Total valid votes		8,473	97.81	
Total rejected ballots		190	2.19	–0.08
Turnout		8,663	73.07	+0.96
Eligible voters		11,856		
Progressive Conservative gain from Liberal		Swing		+8.77
Source: Library of Parliament

1962 Canadian federal election: Northwest Territories
Party	Candidate	Votes	%
Liberal	Isabel Hardie	3,842	46.24
Progressive Conservative	Eugène Rhéaume	3,519	42.35
Unknown	A. Pat Carey	948	11.41
Total valid votes		8,309	97.73
Total rejected ballots		193	2.27
Turnout		8,502	72.11
Eligible voters		11,790	
This riding was created from Mackenzie River, with Liberal Merv Hardie as the incumbent.
Source: Library of Parliament
