= Brendan Bell (politician) =

Canadian politician (born 1971)

Member of the Legislative Assembly of the Northwest Territories for Yellowknife South
- In office 1999–2007
- Preceded by: Seamus Henry
- Succeeded by: Bob McLeod

Personal details
- Born: August 17, 1971 (age 54) Milwaukee, Wisconsin

Brendan Bell (born August 17, 1971 in Milwaukee, Wisconsin) is an American-born Canadian territorial level politician and former cabinet minister.

He was first elected to the Northwest Territories Legislature in the 1999 Northwest Territories general election. He won the Yellowknife South district, defeating former Yellowknife mayor Pat McMahon by just 12 votes. He was re-elected by acclamation in the 2003 Northwest Territories general election.

At the beginning of his second term he was appointed to the Executive Council and has been appointed to three portfolios as Minister of Industry, Tourism and Investment, Minister of Justice and Minister Responsible for the Homeless.

He entered federal politics, where he contested the Western Arctic electoral district under the Conservative Party of Canada banner for the 2008 Canadian federal election but lost by 4.4% or 595 votes to incumbent NDP MP Dennis Bevington.

== Electoral record ==
2008 Canadian federal election: Western Arctic
Party	Candidate	Votes	%	±%	Expenditures
New Democratic	Dennis Bevington	5,669	41.45	–0.71	$39,369.13
Conservative	Brendan Bell	5,146	37.63	+17.79	$84,014.56
Liberal	Gabrielle Mackenzie-Scott	1,858	13.58	–21.40	$37,149.36
Green	Sam Gamble	752	5.50	+3.40	$9,009.53
First Peoples National	Noeline Villebrun	252	1.84	–	$2,738.15
Total valid votes/expense limit		13,677	99.59	–	$84,911.89
Total rejected ballots		56	0.41	+0.08	
Turnout		13,733	47.71	–8.51	
Eligible voters		28,787			
New Democratic hold		Swing		–9.06	
Source: Elections Canada
