= Ted Richard =

Canadian politician

J. Edward "Ted" Richard is a former territorial level politician, lawyer and senior judge of the Supreme Court of the Northwest Territories. Richard, a former lawyer, was a partner in the law firm of Richard, Vertes, Peterson & Schuler in Yellowknife, Northwest Territories. He practised private law until 1988.

Richard was first elected to the Northwest Territories legislature to represent Yellowknife South in a 1984 by-election, defeating Yellowknife city councillor Pat McMahon, after incumbent MLA Lynda Sorenson stepped down to run as the Liberal candidate for Western Arctic in the 1984 Canadian federal election. He won reelection in the 1987 Northwest Territories general election, but resigned his seat in the legislature in 1988 upon his appointment to the court.

Richard was also appointed to serve as a judge in the Court of Appeal of Nunavut.

Legislative Assembly of the Northwest Territories
Preceded by Lynda Sorenson	MLA Yellowknife South; 1984–1988	Succeeded by Tony Whitford
