= Merv Hardie =

Canadian politician and businessman (1918–1961)

Member of Parliament for Mackenzie River
- In office August 10, 1953 – October 18, 1961
- Preceded by: Riding established
- Succeeded by: Isabel Hardie (1962)

Personal details
- Born: Mervyn Arthur Hardie; July 31, 1918 Regina, Saskatchewan, Canada
- Died: October 18, 1961 (aged 43) Ottawa, Ontario, Canada
- Party: Liberal
- Spouse: Isabel Hardie
- Profession: Businessman, aviator

Mervyn Arthur Hardie (July 31, 1918 – October 18, 1961) was a Canadian politician, businessman and bush pilot from Northwest Territories, Canada. He served as a Member of the Northwest Territories Council from 1951 to 1953 and as a member of Parliament in the House of Commons of Canada from 1953 until his death in 1961.

== Early life ==
Hardie was born in Regina, Saskatchewan. He attended post secondary education at Notre Dame College. After finishing college he moved to the Northwest Territories and managed A.S. Hodgson's trading post in Yellowknife during 1948/1949. Hardie got his start in politics by serving on Yellowknife municipal council from 1948 to 1950.

== Political career ==
Hardie was elected to the Council of the Northwest Territories in the 1951 Northwest Territories general election as part of the first three elected members returned since 1905. He served the Mackenzie North constituency for three years until he vacated it to run for federal politics.

In the 1953 Canadian federal election he ran in the new Mackenzie River federal electoral district as the candidate of the Liberal Party of Canada. Hardie won that election in a close three way race taking just over half the popular vote. His win made him the first Member of Parliament from the Northwest Territories since 1904. He served as a back bench member of the governing Liberal caucus.

Hardie ran for his second term in office in the 1957 Canadian federal election. He rolled up a very large majority over his Progressive Conservative opponent Harold Parkes. The Progressive Conservatives formed a minority government and Hardie became a very strong member of the official opposition becoming a frequent thorn in the side of the Diefenbaker government.

The minority government lasted less than a year forcing the 1958 Canadian federal election. Despite a landslide win for the Progressive Conservatives, Hardie easily retained his seat in a two way race. The results of the Progressive Conservative landslide completely swept the Liberals with the exception of Hardie off the map west of Ontario.

== Death ==
In 1960 Hardie was diagnosed with cancer and took extended leave from the House of Commons. He returned to the Commons after going into remission and served for several months. Hardie soon became ill again and toured his constituency one last time. Upon his return he was admitted to Ottawa Civic Hospital where he was bedridden for over a month as he underwent a series of chest operations which he did not survive.

Hardie died on October 18, 1961, vacating his seat in the Commons, and was survived by his wife Isabel Hardie and four children. On the day of his death Diefenbaker paid tribute to Hardie calling him "a good man who will be remembered for his courage and abiding faith". His seat in the Commons was left vacant until the 1962 federal election, the Liberals nominated his wife to replace him in the House of Commons of Canada. She won the newly expanded Northwest Territories electoral district serving as a Member of Parliament from 1962 until her defeat in 1963.

A Northwest Territories owned vehicle and passenger ferry was named in his honour, it is known as the M.V. Merv Hardie ferry and operated at the Fort Providence Mackenzie River crossing from 1972 to 2012, when it was replaced by the Deh Cho Bridge.

== Election results ==
1953 Canadian federal election: Mackenzie River
Party	Candidate	Votes	%
Liberal	Merv Hardie	1,722	49.38
Progressive Conservative	Albert Thomas Rivett	1,344	38.54
Independent	Kenneth Conibear	421	12.07
Total valid votes		3,487	96.97
Total rejected ballots		109	3.03
Turnout		3,596	63.29
Eligible voters		5,682	
This riding was created from parts of Yukon—Mackenzie River, where Liberal James Aubrey Simmons was the incumbent.
Source: Library of Parliament

1957 Canadian federal election: Mackenzie River
Party	Candidate	Votes	%	±%
Liberal	Merv Hardie	2,686	68.19	+18.81
Progressive Conservative	Harold E. Parkes	1,253	31.81	–6.73
Total valid votes		3,939	97.43	
Total rejected ballots		104	2.57	–0.46
Turnout		4,043	62.87	–0.42
Eligible voters		6,431		
Liberal hold		Swing		+12.77
Source: Library of Parliament

1958 Canadian federal election: Mackenzie River
Party	Candidate	Votes	%	±%
Liberal	Merv Hardie	2,782	57.22	–10.97
Progressive Conservative	John H. Winter	2,080	42.78	+10.97
Total valid votes		4,862	98.32	
Total rejected ballots		83	1.68	–0.89
Turnout		4,945	73.63	+10.76
Eligible voters		6,716		
Liberal hold		Swing		–10.97
Source: Library of Parliament
