= Yakeleya =

Yakeleya is a surname. Notable people with the surname include:

- Norman Yakeleya (born 1959), Canadian politician
- Sheryl Yakeleya, Canadian politician
