= Isabel Hardie =

Canadian politician, artist, and civil servant

Member of Parliament for Northwest Territories
- In office June 18, 1962 – April 8, 1963
- Preceded by: Merv Hardie (1961)
- Succeeded by: Eugène Rhéaume

Personal details
- Born: Isabel Tibbie; February 4, 1916 Toronto, Ontario, Canada
- Died: November 14, 2006 (aged 90) White Rock, British Columbia Canada
- Party: Liberal
- Spouse: Merv Hardie
- Profession: Homemaker, artist

Isabel J. Tibbie "Tibi" Hardie (February 4, 1916 – November 14, 2006) was a Canadian politician and civil servant from Northwest Territories, Canada. She represented the electoral district of Northwest Territories from 1962 to 1963 as a member of the Liberal Party of Canada.

Isabel was the wife of former parliamentarian Merv Hardie, who represented the predecessor district of Mackenzie River. She ran in her husband's place for the Liberal Party of Canada in the 1962 federal election after he died vacating his seat in the House of Commons on October 18, 1961.

In that election she defeated Progressive Conservative challenger Eugène Rhéaume by fewer than 300 votes in a hotly contested election. Isabel served one year in opposition until she was defeated after facing Rhéaume again in the 1963 Canadian federal election.

== Electoral history ==
1963 Canadian federal election: Northwest Territories
Party	Candidate	Votes	%	±%
Progressive Conservative	Eugène Rhéaume	4,814	56.82	+14.47
Liberal	Isabel Hardie	3,659	43.18	–3.06
Total valid votes		8,473	97.81	
Total rejected ballots		190	2.19	–0.08
Turnout		8,663	73.07	+0.96
Eligible voters		11,856		
Progressive Conservative gain from Liberal		Swing		+8.77
Source: Library of Parliament

1962 Canadian federal election: Northwest Territories
Party	Candidate	Votes	%
Liberal	Isabel Hardie	3,842	46.24
Progressive Conservative	Eugène Rhéaume	3,519	42.35
Unknown	A. Pat Carey	948	11.41
Total valid votes		8,309	97.73
Total rejected ballots		193	2.27
Turnout		8,502	72.11
Eligible voters		11,790	
This riding was created from Mackenzie River, with Liberal Merv Hardie as the incumbent.
Source: Library of Parliament
