= Jake Ootes =

Canadian politician

Member of the Legislative Assembly of the Northwest Territories
- In office 1995–2003
- Preceded by: Brian Lewis
- Succeeded by: Robert Hawkins
- Constituency: Yellowknife Centre

Personal details
- Born: August 5, 1942 (age 83) Schagen, Netherlands
- Party: non-partisan consensus government
- Relations: Case Ootes (brother)
- Occupation: publisher

Jake Ootes (born August 5, 1942) is a retired territorial level politician and newspaper and magazine publisher from Northwest Territories, Canada.

== Early life and career ==
Ootes was born in the Schagen, Netherlands, in 1942 and moved with his family to Canada in 1952 and lived in Renfrew, Ontario. Ootes worked as reporters in newspapers in Ontario and then moved into the federal civil service in the 1960s.

Ootes began his career in politics working for the Northwest Territories Legislative Council in 1964 as a Hansard editor, he worked in that position until 1967. In 1967, Ootes became an Executive Assistant for Northwest Territories Commissioner Stuart Milton Hodgson. He served in that position until 1975.

Ootes left his position in the Commissioners office to buy a newspaper in 1975, he grew a small publishing business. Publishing newspapers and magazines until he sold his interests in 1995 to run for electoral politics.

Ootes was elected to the Northwest Territories Legislature in the 1995 Northwest Territories general election winning the Yellowknife Centre district. He won his second term in office with 60% of the vote in the 1999 Northwest Territories general election. He retired from his seat at the dissolution of the legislative assembly in the 2003 election.

Ootes now owns Celista Estate Winery in Celista, British Columbia. Ootes has owned the winery since 1995 and moved to British Columbia in 2005.

His brother Case Ootes is a municipal councilor in Toronto, Ontario, and married to Margaret Ootes.

Legislative Assembly of the Northwest Territories
Preceded by Brian Lewis	MLA Yellowknife Centre; 1995–2003	Succeeded by Robert Hawkins
