= Matt Barrie =

Matt Barrie may refer to:

- Matt Barrie (businessman) (born 1973), Australian technology entrepreneur
- Matt Barrie (sportscaster), American ESPN sportscaster

== See also ==
- Matt Berry (disambiguation)
