= Michael McLeod (politician) =

Canadian politician

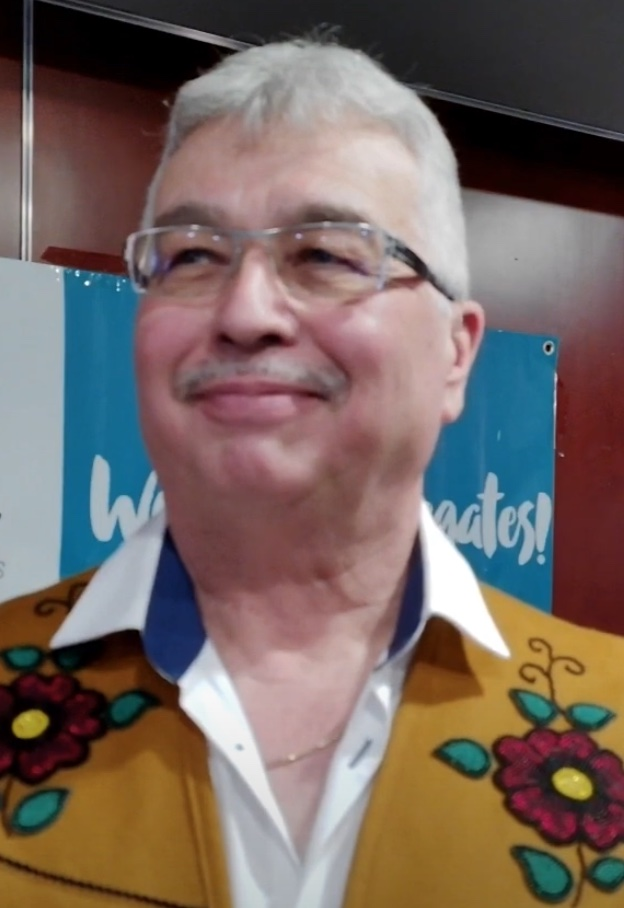

Member of Parliament for the Northwest Territories
- In office October 19, 2015 – March 23, 2025
- Preceded by: Dennis Bevington
- Succeeded by: Rebecca Alty

Member of the Legislative Assembly of the Northwest Territories
- In office December 6, 1999 – October 3, 2011
- Preceded by: Samuel Gargan
- Succeeded by: Michael Nadli
- Constituency: Deh Cho

Personal details
- Born: September 6, 1959 (age 66) Fort Providence, Northwest Territories, Canada
- Party: Liberal
- Relatives: Bob McLeod (brother)

Michael McLeod (born September 6, 1959) is a Canadian politician, who served as a member of Parliament representing the Northwest Territories. He was first elected in the 2015 Canadian federal election, unseating Dennis Bevington, who was the incumbent New Democratic Party MP for the riding. He did not seek re-election in 2025. McLeod was a former member of the Legislative Assembly of the Northwest Territories, Canada, as well as the former mayor of Fort Providence.

== Political career ==
McLeod was born in Fort Providence, Northwest Territories. When he was 22, he served as a mayor of Fort Providence after being chosen by the local Dene council.

McLeod first ran for a seat in the 1999 Northwest Territories general election. He won an upset election defeating Speaker Samuel Gargan to win the Deh Cho electoral district. He was re-elected in the 2003 Northwest Territories general election winning a hotly contested election over challenger Michael Nadli by just 13 votes.

McLeod was returned by acclamation in the 2007 Northwest Territories general election, and served in cabinet as Minister of Transportation and Minister of Public Works and Services. He was defeated by Michael Nadli in the 2011 election.

After his defeat in 2011, McLeod became the director of the Mackenzie River Environmental Impact Review Board and worked to promote tourism in the South Slave for the territorial government. He won the Liberal Party of Canada nomination for the Northwest Territories riding for the 2015 Canadian federal election over Gail Cyr, after a third competitor, Kieron Testart, withdrew from the race and endorsed McLeod. On October 19, 2015, McLeod defeated New Democrat incumbent Dennis Bevington to win the seat.

McLeod was re-elected in the 2019 federal election.

His brother Bob McLeod was a member of the legislature and Premier of the NWT (2011–2019).

== Electoral record ==
=== Federal ===
2021 Canadian federal election: Northwest Territories
Party	Candidate	Votes	%	±%	Expenditures
Liberal	Michael McLeod	5,387	38.22	–1.48	$38,613.28
New Democratic	Kelvin Kotchilea	4,558	32.34	+10.00	$9,753.72
Conservative	Lea Anne Mollison	2,031	14.41	–11.11	$102.43
Independent	Jane Groenewegen	1,791	12.71	–	$5,119.34
Green	Roland Laufer	328	2.33	–8.30	none listed
Total valid votes/expense limit		14,095	98.91	–	$112,897.49
Total rejected ballots		155	1.09	+0.33	
Turnout		14,250	46.69	–6.78	
Eligible voters		30,519			
Liberal hold		Swing		–5.74	
Source: Elections Canada

2019 Canadian federal election: Northwest Territories
Party	Candidate	Votes	%	±%	Expenditures
Liberal	Michael McLeod	6,467	39.70	–8.64	$52,960.49
Conservative	Yanik D'Aigle	4,157	25.52	+7.17	$32,799.03
New Democratic	Mary Beckett	3,640	22.34	–8.14	$13,802.03
Green	Paul Falvo	1,731	10.63	+7.80	$5,245.48
People's	Luke Quinlan	296	1.82	–	$1,007.36
Total valid votes/expense limit		16,291	99.24	–	$109,554.64
Total rejected ballots		125	0.76	+0.21	
Turnout		16,416	53.47	–9.89	
Eligible voters		30,704			
Liberal hold		Swing		–7.91	
Source: Elections Canada

2015 Canadian federal election: Northwest Territories
Party	Candidate	Votes	%	±%	Expenditures
Liberal	Michael McLeod	9,172	48.34	+29.90	$71,207.71
New Democratic	Dennis Bevington	5,783	30.48	–15.36	$37,599.86
Conservative	Floyd Roland	3,481	18.35	–13.76	$75,298.47
Green	John Moore	537	2.83	–0.23	none listed
Total valid votes/expense limit		18,973	99.45	–	$214,028.20
Total rejected ballots		104	0.55	–	
Turnout		19,077	63.36	–	
Eligible voters		30,110			
Liberal gain from New Democratic		Swing		+22.63	
Source: Elections Canada

=== Territorial ===
2011 Northwest Territories general election
Name	Vote	%
Michael Nadli	394	
Michael McLeod	226	

2007 Northwest Territories general election
Name	Vote	%
Michael McLeod	Acclaimed	

2003 Northwest Territories general election
Name	Vote	%
Michael McLeod	318	51.04%
Michael Nadli	305	48.96%
Total Valid Ballots	623	100%
Voter Turnout 79.35%	Rejected Ballots 7	

1999 Northwest Territories general election
Name	Vote	%
Michael McLeod	382	62.62%
Samuel Gargan	228	37.38%
Total	610	100%
Voter Turnout 84.25%	Rejected Ballots 5	
