= Bud Orange =

Canadian politician

Robert Orange
- Official 1968 portrait

Member of Parliament for Northwest Territories
- In office 1965–1972
- Preceded by: Eugène Rhéaume
- Succeeded by: Wally Firth

Personal details
- Born: Robert John Orange; January 3, 1926 Ottawa, Ontario, Canada
- Died: May 6, 2007 (aged 81) Ottawa
- Party: Liberal
- Profession: Economist, public servant

Robert John "Bud" Orange (January 3, 1926 – May 6, 2007) was a politician, civil servant and economist from Northwest Territories, Canada. He served briefly with the Royal Navy Fleet Air Arm in 1945. Orange worked at the Dominion Bureau of Statistics.

Robert ran for election to the House of Commons of Canada in the 1965 Canadian federal election for the Liberal Party of Canada and defeated incumbent Eugène Rhéaume.

He was re-elected in the 1968 Canadian federal election and served a second full term in office before retiring from federal politics in 1972. Orange died in 2007 at the age of 81, and was buried in St. Stephen's Cemetery in Old Chelsea, Quebec.

1968 Canadian federal election: Northwest Territories
Party	Candidate	Votes	%	±%
Liberal	Bud Orange	6,018	63.80	+7.59
Progressive Conservative	R. Van Norman	2,211	23.44	–15.68
New Democratic	William Harvey Kent	1,203	12.75	+8.09
Total valid votes		9,432	98.63	
Total rejected ballots		131	1.37	–0.36
Turnout		9,563	69.26	–7.03
Eligible voters		13,807		
Liberal hold		Swing		+11.64
Source: Library of Parliament
