= Ronald Bonnetrouge =

Canadian politician

Member of the Legislative Assembly of the Northwest Territories
- In office October 1, 2019 – November 14, 2023
- Preceded by: Michael Nadli
- Succeeded by: Sheryl Yakeleya
- Constituency: Deh Cho

Personal details
- Party: non-partisan consensus government

Ronald Bonnetrouge is a Canadian politician, who was elected to the Legislative Assembly of the Northwest Territories in the 2019 election. He represented the electoral district of Deh Cho.

== Election results ==
2023 Northwest Territories general election: Deh Cho
Candidate	Votes	%
Sheryl Yakeleya	229	39.48
Steven Vandell	178	30.69
Ronald Bonnetrouge (I)	146	25.17
Richard C. Lafferty	27	4.66
Total votes	580	

2019 Northwest Territories general election: Deh Cho
Candidate	Votes
Ronald Bonnetrouge	283
Michael Nadli	253

2015 Northwest Territories general election: Deh Cho
Candidate	Votes	%
Michael Nadli	190	40.6
Ronald Bonnetrouge	172	36.8
Gregory Nyuli	66	14.1
Lyle Fabian	40	8.5
Total valid ballots / Turnout	468	61%
