= Ethel Blondin-Andrew =

Canadian politician (born 1951)

The Honourable Ethel Blondin-Andrew PC OC

Minister of State (Northern Development)
- In office 20 July 2004 – 5 February 2006
- Prime Minister: Paul Martin
- Preceded by: Position established
- Succeeded by: Position abolished

Minister of State (Children and Youth)
- In office 12 December 2003 – 20 July 2004
- Prime Minister: Paul Martin
- Preceded by: Position established
- Succeeded by: Position abolished

Member of the Canada Parliament for Western Arctic
- In office 21 November 1988 – 23 January 2006
- Preceded by: Dave Nickerson
- Succeeded by: Dennis Bevington

Personal details
- Born: Ethel Dorothy Blondin; 25 March 1951 (age 75) Tulita, Northwest Territories, Canada
- Party: Liberal
- Education: University of Alberta

Ethel Dorothy Blondin-Andrew PC OC (born 25 March 1951) is a Canadian politician, educator, and public servant. She became the first Indigenous woman to be elected to the Parliament of Canada in 1988 when she became a member of Parliament for the district of Western Arctic in the Northwest Territories. She is also the first Indigenous woman to be a Canadian Cabinet Minister.

== Early life ==
Blondin-Andrew was born 25 March 1951 in Tulita, Northwest Territories. She is a Dene woman. In 1959, she was sent to Grollier Hall in Inuvik, a residential school. She left the school to live in a tent town with other runaway students. When she was twelve, she went to the hospital for back surgery and discovered that she was ill with tuberculosis. After she recovered, she moved to Délı̨nę with her parents, where a local priest wrote her a recommendation letter for Grandin College, a leadership school in Fort Smith, which accepted her application.

She received a B.Ed from the University of Alberta in 1974, specialising in linguistics and literacy. In 1984, she became national manager of the Indigenous Development Participation Programme which was run by the Canadian Public Service. She was appointed executive director two years later.

== Political career ==
In 1986, she became assistant deputy minister of culture for the Northwest Territories. In this role, she became involved in the Assembly of First Nations Aboriginal Language Foundation and the North American Language Institute. She was approached to run for the Territorial Council of the Northwest Territories but instead she ran to be Member of Parliament for the Western Arctic in the 1988 federal election. She won and while an MP, she became the Liberal Party's Assistant Critic for employment equity and Aboriginal affairs. She also served as chair of the Northern and Western Caucus and the Caucus Committee on Aboriginal Affairs, and as a member of the Special Joint Committee on a Renewed Canada, the Standing Committee on Aboriginal Affairs, the Standing Committee on Northern Development, and the Standing Committee on Electoral Reform. She gave her first speech in the House of Commons in the Dene language.

Following the 1993 federal election, the Liberal Party became the majority party and when Jean Chrétien became prime minister, Blondin-Andrew was appointed secretary of state for training and youth on 4 November 1993. She helped create both Youth Service Canada and the Youth Employment Strategy. On 10 August 1998, she was elected chair for the Main Committee of the World Conference of Ministers Responsible for Youth in Lisbon. On 11 June 1997, she became Secretary of State (Children and Youth).

When Paul Martin succeed Jean Chrétien as prime minister, he appointed Blondin-Andrew as minister of state (children and youth) on 12 December 2003. She served in this role until 20 July 2004, when she became minister of mtate (Northern development). She was re-elected in the 2004 federal election by a razor-thin margin of 53 votes, and was voted out of office in the 2006 federal election, after 17 years of service.

In 2001, her work for Aboriginal communities was formally recognized by Brock University, who awarded her an honorary doctorate. She was also awarded a Queen Elizabeth II Diamond Jubilee Medal by the governor general of Canada in 2012. She also received the 2019 Maclean's Lifetime Achievement Award given to former MPs.

== Later career ==
Blondin-Andrew was the Chair of Sahtu Secretarial Incorporated from 2009 until September 2018. She currently works with the Indigenous Leadership Initiative.

== Personal life ==
Blondin-Andrew currently lives in Norman Wells. She is married to Leon Andrew and has four children and four grandchildren.

== See also ==
- Notable Aboriginal people of Canada

== Select publications ==
- "Live your dreams: by following our vision, aboriginals are changing perceptions and inspiring others". Aboriginal Voices. Vol. 6, no. 15. July–August 1999.

== Electoral history ==
2006 Canadian federal election: Western Arctic
Party	Candidate	Votes	%	±%	Expenditures
New Democratic	Dennis Bevington	6,802	42.16	+3.10	$40,702.82
Liberal	Ethel Blondin-Andrew	5,643	34.98	–4.47	$55,964.50
Conservative	Richard Edjericon	3,200	19.84	+2.67	$47,767.02
Green	Alexandre Beaudin	338	2.10	–2.23	$187.69
Independent	Jan H. Van der Veen	149	0.92	–	$17,661.32
Total valid votes/expense limit		16,132	99.67	–	$78,979.50
Total rejected ballots		54	0.33	–0.17	
Turnout		16,186	56.22	+8.89	
Eligible voters		28,792			
New Democratic gain from Liberal		Swing		+3.79	
Source: Elections Canada

2004 Canadian federal election: Western Arctic
Party	Candidate	Votes	%	±%	Expenditures
Liberal	Ethel Blondin-Andrew	5,317	39.45	–6.15	$57,738.20
New Democratic	Dennis Bevington	5,264	39.05	+12.34	$33,603.74
Conservative	Sean Mandeville	2,314	17.17	–10.52	$15,898.08
Green	Chris O'Brien	583	4.33	–	$2,754.92
Total valid votes/expense limit		13,478	99.50	–	$76,846.23
Total rejected ballots		68	0.50	–0.06	
Turnout		13,546	47.33	–4.91	
Eligible voters		28,619			
Liberal hold		Swing		–9.24	
Change for the Conservatives is based on the combined totals of the Canadian Alliance and the Progressive Conservatives.
Source: Elections Canada

2000 Canadian federal election: Western Arctic
Party	Candidate	Votes	%	±%	Expenditures
Liberal	Ethel Blondin-Andrew	5,855	45.60	+3.96	$56,498
New Democratic	Dennis Bevington	3,430	26.71	+7.41	$27,323
Alliance	Fred Turner	2,273	17.70	+2.99	$15,406
Progressive Conservative	Bruce McLaughlin	1,282	9.98	–2.64	$8,374
Total valid votes		12,840	99.44		
Total rejected ballots		72	0.56	–0.14	
Turnout		12,912	52.24	–6.13	
Eligible voters		24,716			
Liberal hold		Swing		−1.73	
Source: Elections Canada

1997 Canadian federal election: Western Arctic
Party	Candidate	Votes	%	±%	Expenditures
Liberal	Ethel Blondin-Andrew	5,564	41.64	–20.83	$56,834
New Democratic	Mary Beth Levan	2,579	19.30	+12.99	$22,393
Reform	Mike Watt	1,966	14.71	+0.62	$4,546
Progressive Conservative	Bob Dowdall	1,687	12.62	–0.72	$16,020
Independent	Wally Firth	1,567	11.73	–	$8,857
Total valid votes		13,363	99.30		
Total rejected ballots		94	0.70	+0.20	
Turnout		13,457	58.37	–1.72	
Eligible voters		23,053			
Liberal hold		Swing		–16.91	
Source: Elections Canada

1993 Canadian federal election: Western Arctic
Party	Candidate	Votes	%	±%
Liberal	Ethel Blondin-Andrew	8,867	62.47	+20.10
Reform	Mansell C. Grey	2,000	14.09	–
Progressive Conservative	Martin Hanly	1,893	13.34	–15.28
New Democratic	Bill Schram	896	6.31	–18.79
Green	Chris O'Brien	325	2.29	–
Natural Law	Lynn Taylor	213	1.50	–
Total valid votes		14,194	99.50	
Total rejected ballots		71	0.50	–0.03
Turnout		14,265	60.09	–8.53
Eligible voters		23,740		
Liberal hold		Swing		+3.00
Source: Elections Canada

1988 Canadian federal election: Western Arctic
Party	Candidate	Votes	%	±%
Liberal	Ethel Blondin-Andrew	5,415	42.37	+16.51
Progressive Conservative	Dave Nickerson	3,657	28.62	–17.50
New Democratic	Wayne Cahill	3,207	25.10	–2.93
Independent	Cece McCauley	331	2.59	–
Independent	Ernie Lennie	169	1.32	–
Total valid votes		12,779	99.47	
Total rejected ballots		68	0.53	–0.09
Turnout		12,847	68.62	+1.31
Eligible voters		18,721		
Liberal gain from Progressive Conservative		Swing		+17.01
Source: Elections Canada

27th Canadian Ministry (2003–2006) – Cabinet of Paul Martin
Cabinet posts (2)
Predecessor	Office	Successor
	Minister of State (Northern Development); 2004–2006	
	Minister of State (Children and Youth); 2003–2004	
26th Canadian Ministry (1993–2003) – Cabinet of Jean Chrétien
Sub-Cabinet Posts (2)
Predecessor	Title	Successor
	Secretary of State (Children and Youth) (1997–2003)	
	Secretary of State (Training and Youth) (1993–1997)	
Parliament of Canada
Preceded by Dave Nickerson	Member of Parliament Western Arctic; 1988–2006	Succeeded by Dennis Bevington
