= Dave Nickerson =

Canadian politician (born 1944)

Member of Parliament for Western Arctic
- In office May 22, 1979 – November 21, 1988
- Preceded by: Riding established
- Succeeded by: Ethel Blondin-Andrew

Member of the Northwest Territories Legislative Assembly for Yellowknife North
- In office March 10, 1975 – October 1, 1979
- Preceded by: Riding established
- Succeeded by: George Braden

Personal details
- Born: April 30, 1944 (age 81) England
- Party: Progressive Conservative
- Profession: Mining engineer

Dave Nickerson (born April 30, 1944) is a Canadian politician from Northwest Territories, Canada.

== Before politics ==
In 1965, Nickerson arrived in the Northwest Territories and worked at the Discovery and Giant Mines. He then left this position to establish his own minerals exploration business.

== Political career ==
Nickerson was elected to the Legislative Assembly of Northwest Territories for Yellowknife North in the 1975 Northwest Territories general election. He served almost a full term before vacating his seat in 1979 to run in the 1979 Canadian federal election.

Nickerson defeated his fellow MLA David Searle to win the new Western Arctic riding for the Progressive Conservative Party of Canada. He would serve 3 terms in the House of Commons of Canada.

Nickerson was defeated in the 1988 Canadian federal election by Ethel Blondin-Andrew from the Liberal Party of Canada.

== Electoral results ==
1988 Canadian federal election: Western Arctic
| Party | Candidate | Votes | % | ±% |
|---|---|---|---|---|
| Liberal | Ethel Blondin-Andrew | 5,415 | 42.37 | +16.51 |
| Progressive Conservative | Dave Nickerson | 3,657 | 28.62 | –17.50 |
| New Democratic | Wayne Cahill | 3,207 | 25.10 | –2.93 |
| Independent | Cece McCauley | 331 | 2.59 | – |
| Independent | Ernie Lennie | 169 | 1.32 | – |
| Total valid votes | | 12,779 | 99.47 | |
| Total rejected ballots | | 68 | 0.53 | –0.09 |
| Turnout | | 12,847 | 68.62 | +1.31 |
| Eligible voters | | 18,721 | | |
| Liberal gain from Progressive Conservative | | Swing | | +17.01 |
Source: Elections Canada

1984 Canadian federal election: Western Arctic
| Party | Candidate | Votes | % | ±% |
|---|---|---|---|---|
| Progressive Conservative | Dave Nickerson | 5,822 | 46.12 | +12.31 |
| New Democratic | Bertha Allen | 3,538 | 28.03 | –5.60 |
| Liberal | Lynda Sorenson | 3,264 | 25.86 | –6.70 |
| Total valid votes | | 12,624 | 99.38 | |
| Total rejected ballots | | 79 | 0.62 | –0.21 |
| Turnout | | 12,703 | 67.31 | +0.34 |
| Eligible voters | | 18,871 | | |
| Progressive Conservative hold | | Swing | | +8.96 |
Source: Elections Canada

1980 Canadian federal election: Western Arctic
| Party | Candidate | Votes | % | ±% |
|---|---|---|---|---|
| Progressive Conservative | Dave Nickerson | 3,556 | 33.81 | –1.35 |
| New Democratic | Wally Firth | 3,537 | 33.63 | +4.30 |
| Liberal | Gary J. Boyd | 3,425 | 32.56 | –0.59 |
| Total valid votes | | 10,518 | 99.17 | |
| Total rejected ballots | | 88 | 0.83 | +0.13 |
| Turnout | | 10,606 | 66.97 | –5.13 |
| Eligible voters | | 15,836 | | |
| Progressive Conservative hold | | Swing | | –2.83 |
Source: Elections Canada

1979 Canadian federal election: Western Arctic
| Party | Candidate | Votes | % | ±% |
|---|---|---|---|---|
| Progressive Conservative | Dave Nickerson | 4,058 | 35.16 | – |
| Liberal | David Searle | 3,827 | 33.15 | – |
| New Democratic | Georges Erasmus | 3,385 | 29.33 | – |
| Independent | Edward McRae | 273 | 2.37 | – |
| Total valid votes | | 11,543 | 99.30 | |
| Total rejected ballots | | 81 | 0.70 | – |
| Turnout | | 11,624 | 72.10 | – |
| Eligible voters | | 16,123 | | |
| Progressive Conservative notional gain | | Swing | | N/A |
Riding created from part of the former riding of Northwest Territories, with New Democrat Wally Firth as the incumbent.
Source: Elections Canada

Legislative Assembly of the Northwest Territories
| Preceded by New District | MLA Yellowknife North; 1975-1979 | Succeeded by George Braden |
