= Lynda Sorenson =

Canadian politician

Lynda Sorensen, is a politician in Northwest Territories, Canada.

She was elected twice to the Legislative Assembly of Northwest Territories. She was elected in the 1979 Northwest Territories general election and again in the 1983 Northwest Territories general election, but resigned her seat in 1984 to run for the Liberal Party of Canada in Western Arctic in the 1984 Canadian federal election, finishing third in a tight three-way race.

== Electoral record ==
1984 Canadian federal election: Western Arctic
Party	Candidate	Votes	%	±%
Progressive Conservative	Dave Nickerson	5,822	46.12	+12.31
New Democratic	Bertha Allen	3,538	28.03	–5.60
Liberal	Lynda Sorenson	3,264	25.86	–6.70
Total valid votes		12,624	99.38	
Total rejected ballots		79	0.62	–0.21
Turnout		12,703	67.31	+0.34
Eligible voters		18,871		
Progressive Conservative hold		Swing		+8.96
Source: Elections Canada

Legislative Assembly of the Northwest Territories
Preceded by David Searle	MLA Yellowknife South; 1979–1984	Succeeded by Ted Richard
