= Wally Firth =

Canadian politician (1935–2024)

Member of Parliament for Northwest Territories
- In office October 30, 1972 – May 21, 1979
- Preceded by: Robert Orange

Personal details
- Born: January 25, 1935 Fort McPherson, Northwest Territories, Canada
- Died: March 2, 2024 (aged 89) Victoria, British Columbia, Canada
- Party: New Democratic
- Profession: Airplane pilot; broadcaster; flying instructor; fur trader; native rights worker

Walter Firth (January 25, 1935 – March 2, 2024) was a Canadian politician.

== Biography ==
A Métis, Firth was the first Indigenous politician from the North to win a seat in the House of Commons of Canada. He served as the New Democratic Party Member of Parliament for the Northwest Territories during the 1970s. He was first elected to the House of Commons of Canada in the 1972 federal election and re-elected in 1974. He did not run for re-election in 1979, but attempted to return to the House of Commons in the 1980 election. He was defeated in the riding of Western Arctic.

In private life, Firth had various careers as an airplane pilot, flying instructor, broadcaster and fur trader. He was also active as a Native rights advocate.

Firth made another attempt to return to the House of Commons in the 1997 federal election, this time running as an Independent in Western Arctic, but was again unsuccessful.

Firth subsequently returned to the New Democratic Party attempting to win the party's nomination in Yukon for the 2004 election but was unsuccessful. He died in Victoria, British Columbia, on March 2, 2024, at the age of 89.

== Electoral history ==
1997 Canadian federal election: Western Arctic
Party	Candidate	Votes	%	±%	Expenditures
Liberal	Ethel Blondin-Andrew	5,564	41.64	–20.83	$56,834
New Democratic	Mary Beth Levan	2,579	19.30	+12.99	$22,393
Reform	Mike Watt	1,966	14.71	+0.62	$4,546
Progressive Conservative	Bob Dowdall	1,687	12.62	–0.72	$16,020
Independent	Wally Firth	1,567	11.73	–	$8,857
Total valid votes		13,363	99.30		
Total rejected ballots		94	0.70	+0.20	
Turnout		13,457	58.37	–1.72	
Eligible voters		23,053			
Liberal hold		Swing		–16.91	
Source: Elections Canada

1980 Canadian federal election: Western Arctic
Party	Candidate	Votes	%	±%
Progressive Conservative	Dave Nickerson	3,556	33.81	–1.35
New Democratic	Wally Firth	3,537	33.63	+4.30
Liberal	Gary J. Boyd	3,425	32.56	–0.59
Total valid votes		10,518	99.17	
Total rejected ballots		88	0.83	+0.13
Turnout		10,606	66.97	–5.13
Eligible voters		15,836		
Progressive Conservative hold		Swing		–2.83
Source: Elections Canada

1974 Canadian federal election: Northwest Territories
Party	Candidate	Votes	%	±%
New Democratic	Wally Firth	5,410	42.09	+2.27
Progressive Conservative	Bob Ward	4,271	33.23	+2.36
Liberal	Richard Whitford	3,173	24.68	–4.64
Total valid votes		12,854	98.82	
Total rejected ballots		154	1.18	–0.71
Turnout		13,008	61.07	–12.44
Eligible voters		21,299		
New Democratic hold		Swing		+2.32
Source: Library of Parliament

1972 Canadian federal election: Northwest Territories
Party	Candidate	Votes	%	±%
New Democratic	Wally Firth	5,597	39.82	+27.07
Progressive Conservative	Bob Ward	4,339	30.87	+7.43
Liberal	Dick Hill	4,121	29.32	–34.48
Total valid votes		14,057	98.11	
Total rejected ballots		271	1.89	+0.52
Turnout		14,328	73.51	+4.25
Eligible voters		19,491		
New Democratic gain from Liberal		Swing		+17.25
Source: Library of Parliament
