= Deh Cho (electoral district) =

Territorial electoral district in the Northwest Territories, Canada

Northwest Territories electoral district
- Boundaries of Deh Cho

Territorial electoral district
- Legislature: Legislative Assembly of the Northwest Territories
MLA
Sheryl Yakeleya
- First contested: 1983
- Last contested: 2023
- Region: South Slave Region
- Communities: Fort Providence, Hay River Reserve, Enterprise, Kakisa

Deh Cho is a territorial electoral district for the Legislative Assembly of the Northwest Territories, Canada. The district consists of Enterprise, Fort Providence, Hay River Reserve and Kakisa.

== Members of the Legislative Assembly (MLAs) ==
Name	Elected	Left Office
Samuel Gargan	1983	1999
Michael McLeod	1999	2011
Michael Nadli	2011	2019
Ronald Bonnetrouge	2019	2023
Sheryl Yakeleya	2023	present

== Election results ==
=== 2023 election ===
2023 Northwest Territories general election
Candidate	Votes	%
Sheryl Yakeleya	229	39.48
Steven Vandell	178	30.69
Ronald Bonnetrouge (I)	146	25.17
Richard C. Lafferty	27	4.66
Total votes	580	

=== 2019 election ===
2019 Northwest Territories general election
Candidate	Votes
Ronald Bonnetrouge	283
Michael Nadli	253

=== 2015 election ===
2015 Northwest Territories general election
Candidate	Votes	%
Michael Nadli	190	40.6
Ronald Bonnetrouge	172	36.8
Gregory Nyuli	66	14.1
Lyle Fabian	40	8.5
Total valid ballots / Turnout	468	61%

=== 2011 election ===
2011 Northwest Territories general election
Candidate	Votes
Michael Nadli	394
Michael McLeod	226

=== 2007 election ===
2007 Northwest Territories general election
Candidate	Votes
Michael McLeod	Acclaimed
Source(s) "Official Voting Results 2007 General Election" (PDF). Elections NWT. Archived from the original (PDF) on 11 April 2008.

=== 2003 election ===
2003 Northwest Territories general election
Candidate	Votes	%
Michael McLeod	318	51.04%
Michael Nadli	305	48.96%
Total valid ballots / Turnout	623	79.35%
Rejected ballots	7	
Source(s) "Official Voting Results 2003 General Election" (PDF). Elections NWT. Archived from the original (PDF) on 11 April 2008.

=== 1999 election ===
1999 Northwest Territories general election
Candidate	Votes	%
Michael McLeod	382	62.62%
Samuel Gargan	228	37.38%
Total valid ballots / Turnout	610	84.25%
Rejected ballots	5	
Source(s) "Official Voting Results 1999 General Election" (PDF). Elections NWT. Archived from the original (PDF) on 11 April 2008.

=== 1995 election ===
1995 Northwest Territories general election
Candidate	Votes	%
Samuel Gargan	333	54.57%
Joachim Bonnetrouge	189	31.09%
Richard Lafferty	86	14.14%
Total valid ballots / Turnout	610	94.4%
Source(s) Official Voting Results 1995 General Election. Elections Canada.

=== 1991 election ===
1991 Northwest Territories general election
Candidate	Votes
Samuel Gargan	Acclaimed
Source(s) "Report of the Chief Electoral Officer on the Elections of Members to the Council of the Northwest Territories, 1991" (PDF). Elections Northwest Territories.

=== 1987 election ===
1987 Northwest Territories general election
Name	Vote	%
Samuel Gargan		
Total	?	100%
Voter Turnout ?	Rejected Ballots	

=== 1983 election ===
1983 Northwest Territories general election
Name	Vote	%
Samuel Gargan		
Total	?	100%
Voter Turnout ?	Rejected Ballots	

== See also ==
- List of Northwest Territories territorial electoral districts
- Canadian provincial electoral districts
