= Michael Nadli =

Canadian politician

Member of the Legislative Assembly of the Northwest Territories for Deh Cho
- In office October 3, 2011 – September 2, 2019
- Preceded by: Michael McLeod
- Succeeded by: Ronald Bonnetrouge

Michael Nadli is a Canadian politician, represented the electoral district of Deh Cho in the Legislative Assembly of the Northwest Territories from the 2011 election until the 2019 election.

== Political career ==
Nadli first ran for a seat to the Legislative Assembly of the Northwest Territories in the 2003 Northwest Territories general election. He ran in a two-way contest in the Deh Cho electoral district against incumbent Michael McLeod but was defeated.

Nadli would face McLeod for the second time in the 2011 Northwest Territories general election. There would again be two candidates contesting the race with Nadli taking 64% of the popular vote to win his first term in office.

In spring 2014, Nadli broke his wife's wrist during a fight and was sentenced to 45 days in prison, only serving eight. It was the second time he was convicted of assault. In 2004, he was sentenced to six months probation for assaulting his spouse. His re-election in 2015 was considered a surprise.
