= Tony Whitford =

Canadian politician (1941–2024)

Tony Whitford ONWT
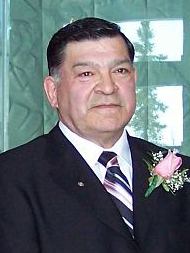
- Whitford in 2006

Commissioner of the Northwest Territories
- In office April 29, 2005 – May 28, 2010
- Prime Minister: Paul Martin; Stephen Harper
- Premier: Joe Handley; Floyd Roland
- Preceded by: Glenna Hansen
- Succeeded by: George Tuccaro

Member of the Legislative Assembly of the Northwest Territories for Yellowknife South
- In office October 31, 1988 – October 16, 1995
- Preceded by: Ted Richard
- Succeeded by: Seamus Henry

Member of the Legislative Assembly of the Northwest Territories for Kam Lake
- In office December 6, 1999 – November 24, 2003
- Preceded by: first member
- Succeeded by: Dave Ramsay

Personal details
- Born: Anthony Wilfred James Whitford; June 11, 1941 Fort Smith, Northwest Territories, Canada
- Died: September 16, 2024 (aged 83) Yellowknife, Northwest Territories, Canada
- Spouse: Mary Elaine Sweet (m. 1966)
- Children: Warren, Blair, and Ian
- Education: University of Calgary

Anthony Wilfred James Whitford ONWT (June 11, 1941 – September 16, 2024) was a Canadian politician, who served as the commissioner of the Northwest Territories from 2005 to 2010.

Whitford entered the political arena in 1988 and retired in 2010 after 22 years of civil service. In June 2010, Whitford was appointed an Honorary Naval Captain of the Royal Canadian Navy.

== Early life and career ==
Whitford was born on June 11, 1941, and raised in the Northwest Territories, in the small town of Fort Smith, at the time the capital of the NWT.

As a young man, he worked for Northern Transportation Company (NTCL) on the boats sailing the Mackenzie River and for Northern Canada Power Commission (NCPC) in Fort Smith and Taltson River. Whitford and family moved to Calgary in 1973 where he attended the University of Calgary. He moved to Yellowknife in 1977 and began a career with the Territorial and Federal governments.

== Political career ==
Whitford was first elected to the Northwest Territories Legislative Assembly in 1988 to replace Ted Richard who had been appointed to the Supreme Court of the Northwest Territories. In the 1991 election he was elected to the 12th NWT Assembly representing Yellowknife South.

While not elected in the 1995 election, he was elected, with over 80% of the vote, to the Kam Lake electoral district in the 1999 election sitting in the 24th NWT Assembly. On January 19, 2000, he was appointed Speaker of the Legislative Assembly of the Northwest Territories, replacing Samuel Gargan, a position he was to hold until December 11, 2003.

In October 2004, he became Deputy Commissioner of the Northwest Territories and was appointed Commissioner of the Northwest Territories on April 29, 2005.

Whitford completed his term as Commissioner in April 2010 and served as an Honorary Naval Captain of the Canadian Navy. He maintained a busy schedule with frequent travel to the communities of the Northwest Territories as well as tending to obligations in southern Canada and overseas. Whitford was made a Knight of the Order of St. John in 2010 and a Member of the Order of the Northwest Territories (ONWT) in 2016.

== Personal life and death ==
Whitford married Mary Elaine Whitford (née Sweet) on November 9, 1966. The couple had three children, sons Warren (born June 19, 1968), Blair (born March 6, 1970), and Ian (born March 12, 1971). Elaine died of breast cancer on February 23, 2003. He attended the University of Calgary and earned a Bachelor of Social Work in 1977.

Whitford lived in Yellowknife and was often found at the local Tim Hortons enjoying a coffee and discussing politics with the locals. His hobbies included wood working from which he crafted bird houses.

Whitford died at a hospital in Yellowknife, on September 16, 2024, at the age of 83.

== Arms ==
Coat of arms of Tony Whitford

Notes
Granted 15 June 2006.
Crest
Issuant from a coronet erablé Gules a whooping crane Proper.
Escutcheon
Gules a bend wavy between in chief a black spruce tree and in base a mountain avens flower Argent on a chief Azure three billets wavy fesswise Argent.
Supporters
Two bison guardant Proper each charged on the flank with an open book surmounting two wrenches in saltire and supporting a mace Argent standing on a grassy mound Vert set with wild roses leaved Argent.
Motto
Perseverance Commitment Service
