= Yellowknife South =

Territorial electoral district in the Northwest Territories, Canada

Northwest Territories electoral district
- Boundaries of Yellowknife South in Yellowknife

Territorial electoral district
- Legislature: Legislative Assembly of the Northwest Territories
MLA
Caroline Wawzonek
- First contested: 1975
- Last contested: 2023

Demographics
- Census subdivision: Yellowknife

Yellowknife South is a territorial electoral district for the Legislative Assembly of the Northwest Territories, Canada. It is one of seven districts that represent Yellowknife.

== Members of the Legislative Assembly (MLAs) ==
Name	Elected	Left Office
David Searle	1975	1979
Lynda Sorenson	1979	1983
Ted Richard	1984	1988
Tony Whitford	1988	1995
Seamus Henry	1995	1999
Brendan Bell	1999	2007
Bob McLeod	2007	2019
Caroline Wawzonek	2019	present

== Election results ==
=== 2023 election ===
2023 Northwest Territories general election
Candidate	Votes
Caroline Wawzonek (I.C.)	Acclaimed

=== 2019 election ===
2019 Northwest Territories general election
Candidate	Votes
Caroline Wawzonek	687
Gaeleen Macpherson	299

=== 2015 election ===
2015 Northwest Territories general election
Candidate	Votes	%
Bob McLeod	485	70.0
Nigit'stil Jessica Norbert	179	25.8
Samuel Roland	29	4.2
Total valid ballots / Turnout	693	33%

=== 2011 election ===
2011 Northwest Territories general election
Candidate	Votes
Bob McLeod	Acclaimed

=== 2007 election ===
2007 Northwest Territories general election
Candidate	Votes	%
Bob McLeod	539	61.46%
Amy Hacala	278	31.70%
Garett Cochrane	57	6.50%
Total valid ballots / Turnout	874	57.36%
Rejected ballots	3	
Source(s) "Official Voting Results 2007 General Election" (PDF). Elections NWT. Archived from the original (PDF) on 11 April 2008.

=== 2003 election ===
2003 Northwest Territories general election
Candidate	Votes
Brendan Bell	Acclaimed
Source(s) "Official Voting Results 2003 General Election" (PDF). Elections NWT. Archived from the original (PDF) on 11 April 2008.

=== 1999 election ===
1999 Northwest Territories general election
Candidate	Votes	%
Brendan Bell	359	40.47%
Pat McMahon	347	39.12%
Mary Beth Levan	181	20.41%
Total valid ballots / Turnout	887	66.77%
Rejected ballots	5	
Source(s) "Official Voting Results 1999 General Election" (PDF). Elections NWT. Archived from the original (PDF) on 11 April 2008.

=== 1979 election ===
1979 Northwest Territories general election
Candidate	Votes	%
Lynda Sorenson	683	47.04%
Wes MacAleer	618	42.56%
Joey Severn	151	10.40%
Total valid ballots / Turnout	1452	64.77%
Rejected ballots	4	
Source(s) "REPORT OF THE CHIEF ELECTORAL OFFICER ON THE GENERAL ELECTION OF MEMBERS TO THE COUNCIL OF THE NORTHWEST TERRITORIES 1979" (PDF). Elections NWT. January 1980.

== By-election reasons ==
1. October 31, 1988 Ted Richard appointed to Northwest Territories Supreme Court.

== See also ==
- List of Northwest Territories territorial electoral districts
- Canadian provincial electoral districts

== Notes ==
a: In the 2007 election, percentages assigned to candidates were based on the total votes cast. In prior elections the percentages were based on the valid votes.
