= Julie Green =

Canadian politician

Julie Green MLA

Member of the Legislative Assembly of the Northwest Territories
- In office November 23, 2015 – November 14, 2023
- Preceded by: Robert Hawkins
- Succeeded by: Robert Hawkins
- Constituency: Yellowknife Centre

Member of the Executive Council of the Northwest Territories
- In office September 4, 2020 – November 14, 2023

Personal details
- Party: non-partisan consensus government
- Spouse: Janice McKenna
- Occupation: journalist, activist

Julie Green is a Canadian politician, who was elected to the Legislative Assembly of the Northwest Territories in the 2015 election. She represented the electoral district of Yellowknife Centre. Green was re-elected in 2019. She was acclaimed to the Executive Council in August 2020 and was subsequently appointed Minister of Health and Social Services, Minister Responsible for Seniors and Minister Responsible for Persons with Disabilities.

Green was one of only two women elected in the 18th Assembly. A resolution passed unanimously on International Women's Day 2018 kicked off the reform process by setting goals to increase women's representation to 20 per cent by 2023 and 30 per cent by 2027. The Legislative Assembly created a special committee to explore ways to meet these goals. Green toured 10 communities with a committee of MLAs to gather ideas for improvement. An interim report tabled in March 2019 made seven recommendations to be implemented before the 2019 election. A final report tabled in June 2019 presented potential legislative changes to accomplish increased women's representation. As a result of the 2019 election, nine women were elected to the Legislative Assembly, surpassing the original goal.

Prior to her election to the legislature, Green worked for the YWCA in Yellowknife, as a journalist for CFYK-TV (CBC North), and served on the boards of the local United Way and the Yellowknife Housing Authority. She was also an LGBT rights activist with the local LGBT group Out North, and is the first out lesbian to serve in the territorial legislature.

Green holds a Bachelor of Arts (Honours) from the University of Saskatchewan, a Master of Arts in history from the University of Calgary, and a Master of Arts in journalism from the University of Western Ontario. As well, she has a Certificate in Fundraising Management from Ryerson University.

== Election results ==
2019 Northwest Territories general election: Yellowknife Centre
Candidate	Votes
Julie Green	291
Arlene Hache	260
Niels Konge	185
Thom Jarvis	103

2015 Northwest Territories general election: Yellowknife Centre
Candidate	Votes	%
Julie Green	491	55.1%
Robert Hawkins	400	44.9%
