= Sam Gargan (politician) =

Canadian politician (1948–2025)

Mayor of Fort Providence
- In office December 15, 2015 – December 11, 2018
- Preceded by: Tina Gargan
- Succeeded by: Danny Beaulieu

Speaker of the Legislative Assembly of Northwest Territories
- In office 1995–2000
- Preceded by: Brian Lewis
- Succeeded by: Tony Whitford

Member of the Legislative Assembly of the Northwest Territories
- In office 1983–1999
- Succeeded by: Michael McLeod
- Constituency: Deh Cho

Personal details
- Born: February 19, 1948 Redknife River, Northwest Territories, Canada
- Died: September 11, 2025 (aged 77) Hay River, Northwest Territories, Canada
- Spouse: Alphonsine Constant
- Children: 5

Samuel Gargan (February 19, 1948 – September 11, 2025) was a Canadian politician who was Speaker of the Legislative Assembly of the Northwest Territories.

== Life and career ==
Gargan was first elected to the Northwest Territories Legislature in the 1983 Northwest Territories general election. He was re-elected to a second term in the 1987 Northwest Territories general election. He would be returned by acclamation to a third term in the 1991 Northwest Territories general election. He would be elected Speaker by members of the Legislature on February 15, 1995. He ran for re-election to what would be his final term in the 1995 Northwest Territories general election. He served his entire fourth term as Speaker, running for a fifth term in the 1999 Northwest Territories general election. In that election he was defeated by candidate Michael McLeod losing his seat and the Speakership.

In 2009, Gargan was chosen as Grand Chief of the Dehcho First Nations. He was the mayor of Fort Providence from December 15, 2015 until December 11, 2018 when he was defeated by Danny Beaulieu.

Gargan died in Hay River, Northwest Territories on September 11, 2025, at the age of 77.

Legislative Assembly of the Northwest Territories
Preceded by New District	MLA Deh Cho; 1983–1999	Succeeded by Michael McLeod
Preceded by Brian Lewis	Speaker of the Legislative Assembly of Northwest Territories; 1995–2000	Succeeded by Tony Whitford
