= Brian Lewis (politician) =

Canadian politician

Brian W. Lewis

Member of the Legislative Assembly of the Northwest Territories
- In office 1987–1995
- Preceded by: Robert H. MacQuarrie
- Succeeded by: Jake Ootes
- Constituency: Yellowknife Centre

Personal details
- Born: September 26, 1936 (age 90) London, England, United Kingdom
- Party: non-partisan consensus government
- Spouse(s): Della Bunz, m. 3 Aug 1963
- Children: 4
- Education: University of Wales; University of Toronto
- Occupation: educator, author

Brian Wyndham Lewis is a former educator, deputy minister in the Northwest Territories government, elected politician and speaker of the Northwest Territories Legislature.

Lewis and his family first moved to the Northwest Territories in 1963. Lewis was first elected to the Northwest Territories Legislature in the 1987 Northwest Territories general election he won the Yellowknife Centre electoral district. He was re-elected in the 1991 Northwest Territories general election. Lewis ran for the position of speaker but was defeated by Jeannie Marie-Jewell. He became deputy speaker instead. On December 15, 1994, Jewell resigned as speaker and Lewis automatically became Acting Speaker. He held that position until February 15, 1995.

Legislative Assembly of the Northwest Territories
Preceded by Robert H. MacQuarrie	MLA Yellowknife Centre; 1987–1995	Succeeded by Jake Ootes
Preceded by Jeannie Marie-Jewell	Acting Speaker of the Legislative Assembly of Northwest Territories; 1994–1995	Succeeded by Samuel Gargan
