= Seamus Henry =

Canadian politician

Seamus Henry (born July 4, 1949) is a Northern Ireland-born former member of the Legislative Assembly of the Northwest Territories.

He was elected to the Northwest Territories Legislature in the 1995 Northwest Territories general election. He defeated incumbent Tony Whitford in an upset race by four votes. Henry retired from politics at the end of his term in 1999.

Legislative Assembly of the Northwest Territories
Preceded by Tony Whitford	MLA Yellowknife South; 1995-1999	Succeeded by Brendan Bell
