= Northwest Territories (electoral district) =

Federal electoral district in the Northwest Territories, Canada

Northwest Territories electoral district

Federal electoral district
- Legislature: House of Commons
MP
Rebecca Alty
Liberal
- District created: 1976
- First contested: 1979
- Last contested: 2025
- District webpage: profile, map

Demographics
- Population (2021): 41,070
- Electors (2019): 30,235
- Area (km²): 1,127,711.92
- Pop. density (per km²): 0.04
- Census division(s): Region 1, Region 2, Region 3, Region 4, Region 5, Region 6
- Census subdivision(s): Yellowknife, Hay River, Inuvik, Fort Smith, Behchokò, Fort Simpson, Tuktoyaktuk, Norman Wells, Fort McPherson, Fort Providence

Northwest Territories electoral district

Defunct federal electoral district
- Legislature: House of Commons
- District created: 1962
- District abolished: 1976
- First contested: 1962
- Last contested: 1974

Northwest Territories (French: Territoires du Nord-Ouest) is a federal electoral district represented in the House of Commons of Canada. The electoral district covers the entire territory.

This riding was created in 1962 from Mackenzie River riding. It was composed of the entire territory of the Northwest Territories. In 1979, the riding was divided into the ridings of Western Arctic and Nunatsiaq (later Nunavut). Following the creation of the territory of Nunavut in 1999, the riding of Western Arctic was made coterminous with the new Northwest Territories.

After 1999, Western Arctic was an anomaly in that, unlike Nunavut and Yukon, it did not share the name of the territory with which it was coterminous. This did not change with subsequent representation orders because the electoral boundaries revision process did not affect the territories and the territorial riding names were specified in law. In 2014, at the behest of Western Arctic MP Dennis Bevington, the riding name was changed to Northwest Territories by Bill C-37, which also changed the names of several other ridings scheduled to come into effect with the representation order for the next election. Unlike those names, the change to Northwest Territories came into effect immediately as it involved amending the Electoral Boundaries Readjustment Act itself.

From 1887 to 1905, the only areas of the NWT with representation in Parliament were those areas that became part of present-day provinces (Alberta, Saskatchewan and western Manitoba). From 1905 to 1947, the NWT was not represented in Parliament. From 1947 to 1962, the southwestern NWT was represented only by the electoral district of Yukon—Mackenzie River and then Mackenzie River. In 1962, the electoral district of NWT was created to represent the entire territory, for the first time giving all Canadian territory a representative in Parliament.

This riding's boundaries remained the same following the 2012 redistribution.

== Demographics ==
According to the 2021 Canadian census

Ethnic groups: 49.6% Native Canadian, 38.2% White, 4.1% Filipino, 2.6% Black, 1.9% South Asian
Languages: 76% English, 3.3% Tlicho, 2.8% French, 1.9% Slavey, 1.9% Tagalog, 1% Dene
Religions: 55.2% Christian (21% Catholic, 8.1% Anglican, 2% United Church, 1.9% Pentecostal and other Charismatic 1.5% Baptist), 39.8% No religion, 1.8% Muslim
Median income: $56 800
Average income: $69 400

== Members of Parliament ==
Following the division into Western Arctic and Nunatsiaq, the riding's first MP was Progressive Conservative MP Dave Nickerson, who was first elected in 1979 and re-elected twice. In the 1988 election, Nickerson was defeated by Liberal Ethel Blondin-Andrew who went on to serve as the riding's MP for eighteen years, including two years as Minister of State for Northern Development. In 2006, Blondin-Andrew was defeated by New Democrat Dennis Bevington. The earlier riding of Northwest Territories had been represented by New Democrat Wally Firth from 1972 to 1979.

This riding has elected the following members of Parliament:

Parliament	Years	Member	Party
Northwest Territories; Riding created from Mackenzie River
25th	1962–1963	Isabel Hardie	Liberal
26th	1963–1965	Eugène Rhéaume	Progressive Conservative
27th	1965–1968	Bud Orange	Liberal
28th	1968–1972	Bud Orange	Liberal
29th	1972–1974	Wally Firth	New Democratic
30th	1974–1979	Wally Firth	New Democratic
Riding divided into Western Arctic and Nunatsiaq
As Western Arctic
31st	1979–1980	Dave Nickerson	Progressive Conservative
32nd	1980–1984	Dave Nickerson	Progressive Conservative
33rd	1984–1988	Dave Nickerson	Progressive Conservative
34th	1988–1993	Ethel Blondin-Andrew	Liberal
35th	1993–1997	Ethel Blondin-Andrew	Liberal
36th	1997–2000	Ethel Blondin-Andrew	Liberal
37th	2000–2004	Ethel Blondin-Andrew	Liberal
38th	2004–2006	Ethel Blondin-Andrew	Liberal
39th	2006–2008	Dennis Bevington	New Democratic
40th	2008–2011	Dennis Bevington	New Democratic
41st	2011–2014	Dennis Bevington	New Democratic
Northwest Territories
41st	2014–2015	Dennis Bevington	New Democratic
42nd	2015–2019	Michael McLeod	Liberal
43rd	2019–2021	Michael McLeod	Liberal
44th	2021–2025	Michael McLeod	Liberal
45th	2025–present	Rebecca Alty	Liberal

== Election results ==
Graph of election results in Northwest Territories/Western Arctic (since 1979, minor parties that never got 2% of the vote or didn't run consistently are omitted)

=== Northwest Territories (2014–present) ===
2025 Canadian federal election
Party	Candidate	Votes	%	±%	Expenditures
Liberal	Rebecca Alty	8,855	53.51	+15.29	$48,814.53
Conservative	Kimberly Fairman	5,513	33.31	+18.90	$42,115.81
New Democratic	Kelvin Kotchilea	2,011	12.15	–20.19	$23,223.74
Green	Rainbow Eyes	170	1.03	–1.30	none listed
Total valid votes/expense limit		16,549	98.81	–	$130,570.22
Total rejected ballots		199	1.19	+0.10	
Turnout		16,748	54.92	+8.23	
Eligible voters		30,497			
Liberal hold		Swing		+17.10	
Source: Elections Canada

2021 Canadian federal election
Party	Candidate	Votes	%	±%	Expenditures
Liberal	Michael McLeod	5,387	38.22	–1.48	$38,613.28
New Democratic	Kelvin Kotchilea	4,558	32.34	+10.00	$9,753.72
Conservative	Lea Anne Mollison	2,031	14.41	–11.11	$102.43
Independent	Jane Groenewegen	1,791	12.71	–	$5,119.34
Green	Roland Laufer	328	2.33	–8.30	none listed
Total valid votes/expense limit		14,095	98.91	–	$112,897.49
Total rejected ballots		155	1.09	+0.33	
Turnout		14,250	46.69	–6.78	
Eligible voters		30,519			
Liberal hold		Swing		–5.74	
Source: Elections Canada

2019 Canadian federal election
Party	Candidate	Votes	%	±%	Expenditures
Liberal	Michael McLeod	6,467	39.70	–8.64	$52,960.49
Conservative	Yanik D'Aigle	4,157	25.52	+7.17	$32,799.03
New Democratic	Mary Beckett	3,640	22.34	–8.14	$13,802.03
Green	Paul Falvo	1,731	10.63	+7.80	$5,245.48
People's	Luke Quinlan	296	1.82	–	$1,007.36
Total valid votes/expense limit		16,291	99.24	–	$109,554.64
Total rejected ballots		125	0.76	+0.21	
Turnout		16,416	53.47	–9.89	
Eligible voters		30,704			
Liberal hold		Swing		–7.91	
Source: Elections Canada

2015 Canadian federal election
Party	Candidate	Votes	%	±%	Expenditures
Liberal	Michael McLeod	9,172	48.34	+29.90	$71,207.71
New Democratic	Dennis Bevington	5,783	30.48	–15.36	$37,599.86
Conservative	Floyd Roland	3,481	18.35	–13.76	$75,298.47
Green	John Moore	537	2.83	–0.23	none listed
Total valid votes/expense limit		18,973	99.45	–	$214,028.20
Total rejected ballots		104	0.55	–	
Turnout		19,077	63.36	–	
Eligible voters		30,110			
Liberal gain from New Democratic		Swing		+22.63	
Source: Elections Canada

=== Western Arctic (1979–2014) ===
2011 Canadian federal election
Party	Candidate	Votes	%	±%
New Democratic	Dennis Bevington	7,140	45.80	+4.36
Conservative	Sandy Lee	5,001	32.10	−5.51
Liberal	Joe Handley	2,872	18.40	+4.82
Green	Eli Purchase	447	3.10	−2.39
Animal Alliance	Bonnie Dawson	87	0.60	–
Total valid votes		15,577	100.0	
Total rejected ballots		78	0.50	+0.09
Turnout		15,655	55.43	+7.72
Eligible voters		28,244		
New Democratic hold		Swing		+4.94

2008 Canadian federal election
Party	Candidate	Votes	%	±%	Expenditures
New Democratic	Dennis Bevington	5,669	41.44	−0.99	$39,961
Conservative	Brendan Bell	5,146	37.62	+17.14	$84,329
Liberal	Gabrielle Mackenzie-Scott	1,858	13.58	−21.7	$37,884
Green	Sam Gamble	752	5.49	+3.65	$9,010
First Peoples National	Noeline Villebrun	252	1.84	–	–
Total valid votes		13,677	100.0		
Total rejected ballots		56	0.41		
Turnout		13,733	47.71		
Eligible voters		28,787			
New Democratic hold		Swing		−9.06	

2006 Canadian federal election
Party	Candidate	Votes	%	±%	Expenditures
New Democratic	Dennis Bevington	6,801	42.67	+3.62	$40,703
Liberal	Ethel Blondin-Andrew	5,643	35.40	−4.04	
Conservative	Richard Edjericon	3,200	20.08	+2.92	
Green	Alexandre Beaudin	296	1.85	−2.47	
Total valid votes		15,940	100.0		
New Democratic gain from Liberal		Swing		+3.83	

2004 Canadian federal election
Party	Candidate	Votes	%	±%	Expenditures
Liberal	Ethel Blondin-Andrew	5,317	39.44	−6.15	$58,782
New Democratic	Dennis Bevington	5,264	39.05	+12.34	$39,504
Conservative	Sean Mandeville	2,314	17.16	−10.52	$16,863
Green	Chris O'Brien	583	4.32	–	$2,754
Total valid votes		13,478	100.0		
Total rejected ballots		69	0.51		
Turnout		13,547	47.33		
Liberal hold		Swing		−9.24	
Change for the Conservatives is based on the combined totals of the Canadian Alliance and the Progressive Conservatives.

2000 Canadian federal election
Party	Candidate	Votes	%	±%	Expenditures
Liberal	Ethel Blondin-Andrew	5,855	45.59	+3.96	$56,498
New Democratic	Dennis Bevington	3,430	26.71	+7.42	$27,323
Alliance	Fred Turner	2,273	17.70	+2.99	$15,406
Progressive Conservative	Bruce McLaughlin	1,687	9.98	−2.64	$8,374
Total valid votes		12,840	100.0		
Total rejected ballots		72	0.56		
Turnout		12,912	52.24		
Liberal hold		Swing		−1.73	
Change for the Canadian Alliance is based on the Reform Party.

1997 Canadian federal election
Party	Candidate	Votes	%	±%	Expenditures
Liberal	Ethel Blondin-Andrew	5,564	41.63	−20.84	$56,834
New Democratic	Mary Beth Levan	2,579	19.29	+12.98	$22,393
Reform	Mike Watt	1,966	14.71	+0.62	$4,546
Progressive Conservative	Bob Dowdall	1,687	12.62	–0.71	$16,020
Independent	Wally Firth	1,567	11.72	–	$8,857
Total valid votes		13,363	100.0		
Total rejected ballots		94	0.70		
Turnout		13,457	58.37		
Liberal hold		Swing		−16.91	

1993 Canadian federal election
Party	Candidate	Votes	%	±%
Liberal	Ethel Blondin-Andrew	8,867	62.47	+20.10
Reform	Mansell Grey	2,000	14.09	–
Progressive Conservative	Martin Hanly	1,893	13.34	−15.28
New Democratic	Bill Schram	896	6.31	−18.78
Green	Chris O'Brien	325	2.29	–
Natural Law	Lynn Taylor	213	1.50	–
Total valid votes		14,194	100.0	
Liberal hold		Swing		+3.00

1988 Canadian federal election
Party	Candidate	Votes	%	±%
Liberal	Ethel Blondin	5,415	42.37	+16.52
Progressive Conservative	Dave Nickerson	3,657	28.62	−17.50
New Democratic	Wayne Cahill	3,207	25.10	−2.93
Independent	Cece McCauley	331	2.59	–
Independent	Ernie Lennie	169	1.32	–
Total valid votes		12,779	100.0	
Liberal gain from Progressive Conservative		Swing		+17.01

1984 Canadian federal election
Party	Candidate	Votes	%	±%
Progressive Conservative	Dave Nickerson	5,822	46.12	+12.31
New Democratic	Bertha Allen	3,538	28.03	−5.60
Liberal	Lynda Sorenson	3,264	25.86	−6.71
Total valid votes		12,624	100.0	
Progressive Conservative hold		Swing		+8.96

1980 Canadian federal election
Party	Candidate	Votes	%	±%
Progressive Conservative	Dave Nickerson	3,556	33.81	−1.35
New Democratic	Wally Firth	3,537	33.63	+4.30
Liberal	Gary Boyd	3,425	32.56	–0.59
Total valid votes		10,518	100.0	
Progressive Conservative hold		Swing		−2.82
lop.parl.ca

1979 Canadian federal election
Party	Candidate	Votes	%
Progressive Conservative	Dave Nickerson	4,058	35.16
Liberal	David Searle	3,827	33.15
New Democratic	Georges Erasmus	3,385	29.33
Independent	Edward McRae	273	2.37
Total valid votes		11,543	100.0
Riding created from part of the former riding of Northwest Territories, with New Democrat Wally Firth as the incumbent.

=== Northwest Territories (1962–1974) ===
Graph of election results in Northwest Territories (1962-1974, parties that never got 2% of the vote or didn't run consistently are omitted)

1974 Canadian federal election
Party	Candidate	Votes	%	±%
New Democratic	Wally Firth	5,410	42.09	+2.27
Progressive Conservative	Bob Ward	4,271	33.23	+2.36
Liberal	Richard Whitford	3,173	24.68	–4.64
Total valid votes		12,854	98.82	
Total rejected ballots		154	1.18	–0.71
Turnout		13,008	61.07	–12.44
Eligible voters		21,299		
New Democratic hold		Swing		+2.32
Source: Library of Parliament

1972 Canadian federal election
Party	Candidate	Votes	%	±%
New Democratic	Wally Firth	5,597	39.82	+27.07
Progressive Conservative	Bob Ward	4,339	30.87	+7.43
Liberal	Dick Hill	4,121	29.32	–34.48
Total valid votes		14,057	98.11	
Total rejected ballots		271	1.89	+0.52
Turnout		14,328	73.51	+4.25
Eligible voters		19,491		
New Democratic gain from Liberal		Swing		+17.25
Source: Library of Parliament

1968 Canadian federal election
Party	Candidate	Votes	%	±%
Liberal	Bud Orange	6,018	63.80	+7.59
Progressive Conservative	R. Van Norman	2,211	23.44	–15.68
New Democratic	William Harvey Kent	1,203	12.75	+8.09
Total valid votes		9,432	98.63	
Total rejected ballots		131	1.37	–0.36
Turnout		9,563	69.26	–7.03
Eligible voters		13,807		
Liberal hold		Swing		+11.64
Source: Library of Parliament

1965 Canadian federal election
Party	Candidate	Votes	%	±%
Liberal	Bud Orange	5,194	56.21	+13.03
Progressive Conservative	Eugène Rhéaume	3,615	39.12	–17.70
New Democratic	Tieleman Erkelens	431	4.66	–
Total valid votes		9,240	98.27	
Total rejected ballots		163	1.73	–0.46
Turnout		9,403	76.29	+3.22
Eligible voters		12,326		
Liberal gain from Progressive Conservative		Swing		+15.37
Source: Library of Parliament

1963 Canadian federal election
Party	Candidate	Votes	%	±%
Progressive Conservative	Eugène Rhéaume	4,814	56.82	+14.47
Liberal	Isabel Hardie	3,659	43.18	−3.06
Total valid votes		8,473	100.0	
Progressive Conservative gain from Liberal		Swing		+8.76

1962 Canadian federal election
Party	Candidate	Votes	%
Liberal	Isabel Hardie	3,842	46.24
Progressive Conservative	Eugène Rhéaume	3,519	42.35
Independent	A. Pat Carey	948	11.41
Total valid votes		8,309	100.0
This riding was created from Mackenzie River, with Liberal Merv Hardie as the incumbent.

== Federal riding associations ==
Riding associations are the local branches of the national political parties:

Party	Association name	CEO	HQ address	HQ city
Conservative	Western Arctic Conservative Association	Bill Aho	5523 44th Street	Yellowknife
Green	Green Party of Canada — Western Arctic	Jessica Gamble	15 Gitzel Street	Yellowknife
Liberal	Northwest Territories Federal Liberal Association	Chuck Blyth	PO BOX 965	Yellowknife
New Democratic	Western Arctic Federal NDP Riding Association	Shane Pyke	PO BOX 2185	Yellowknife

== See also ==
- List of Canadian electoral districts
- Historical federal electoral districts of Canada
