= Arthur Massey Berry =

Canadian bush pilot

- Born: June 19, 1888; March, Ontario, Canada
- Died: May 12, 1970 (aged 81); Edmonton, Alberta, Canada
- Occupation: Bush pilot

Arthur Massey "Matt" Berry (June 19, 1888 – May 12, 1970) was a pioneering Canadian bush pilot.

== Early years ==
Born on a farm in March, Ontario, near Ottawa, on June 19, 1888, Arthur Massey (Matt) Berry entered the First World War as a Captain with the 153rd Battalion of the Canadian Expeditionary Force. In that role, he was given British pilot certification by the Royal Flying Corps in England before returning to Deseronto, Ontario as a flight instructor for the 189th Training Squadron. In 1919, as a civilian, he was certified as a pilot in Canada. For a number of years thereafter, he pursued other interests before gaining a commercial pilots license in 1928.

== Piloting career ==
Berry's first work was with the Northern Aerial Mineral Exploration Ltd. at Hudson, Ontario, where he became the first pilot to land at Baker Lake, Northwest Territories. In 1929, he took a course in flight instruction. In 1931, he became the first pilot to fly back and forth between Great Bear Lake in the Northwest Territories and Edmonton, Alberta in the same day. In 1931, Berry joined Canadian Airways Limited (CAL), though his early history of the company was unstable due to lay-offs in 1932. Berry briefly joined Mackenzie Air Services, but after being injured in a crash sought further education from a RCAF course at Camp Borden in instrument flying and radio beam work before returning to CAL. During his service to CAL, he piloted several notable rescue flights. In 1935, he found and flew to safety missing CAL pilot Con Farrel and engineer F. Hartley, who had been stranded for eleven days in the Barren Lands after a blizzard downed their aircraft. In 1936, he rescued Flight Lieutenant S. Coleman and Leading Aircraftsman J. Fortey of the RCAF from the Barren Lands north of Great Slave Lake, for which rescue he won the McKee Trophy. Later that same year, he captained a record-breaking mission with engineer Rex Terpening to rescue Bishop Falaise and his party who were stranded by blizzard at the Roman Catholic mission at Hornaday River on the Arctic Ocean. In spite of darkness and storm conditions, Berry and Terpening located the group and made another flight to bring them food. Thereafter, after being grounded for ten days, Berry and Terpening flew the group to safety. No aircraft had ever flown so far north during the winter before.

== Post-piloting years ==
In 1938, Berry left CAL and professional flying, taking a position as manager of Northern Transportation Ltd. at Edmonton. He returned to flight instruction during World War II, standing as second-in-command in Portage la Prairie, Manitoba's No. 7 Air Observer's School. In 1942, he was brought in by the United States government to oversee construction of airfields in the Northwest Territories and in the building of the CANOL Project, a pipeline construction project. Subsequently, he became involved with Max Ward in Yellowknife Airways Ltd., founding himself Territories Air Services Ltd. at Fort Smith. He remained involved with both companies for a short period of time, beginning in 1951 to focus on northern Canadian mining ventures. After failing health forced him to retire in 1969, he died at Edmonton, Alberta on May 12, 1970.

Berry briefly entered politics running as an independent candidate in Yukon—Mackenzie River in the 1949 federal election. He came in second with 34% of the vote behind Liberal candidate James Aubrey Simmons.

== Electoral record ==
1949 Canadian federal election: Yukon—Mackenzie River
Party	Candidate	Votes	%
Liberal	James Aubrey Simmons	3,284	48.96
Independent	Arthur Massey Berry	2,283	34.04
Co-operative Commonwealth	James Elwyn Stephens	1,140	17.00
Total valid votes		6,707	100.0
This riding was created from Yukon and a portion of the previously-unrepresented Northwest Territories. Yukon had elected a Progressive Conservative candidate in the previous election.

== Honours and legacy ==
- Trans-Canada (Mckee) Trophy, 1936
- Canada's Aviation Hall of Fame, 1974
- Namesake of Matt Berry, Edmonton
