= Rebecca Alty =

Canadian politician

The Honourable Rebecca Alty PC MP

Minister of Crown–Indigenous Relations
- Incumbent
- Assumed office May 13, 2025
- Prime Minister: Mark Carney
- Preceded by: Gary Anandasangaree

Member of Parliament for Northwest Territories
- Incumbent
- Assumed office April 28, 2025
- Preceded by: Michael McLeod

15th Mayor of Yellowknife
- In office October 18, 2018 – April 29, 2025
- Preceded by: Mark Heyck
- Succeeded by: Ben Hendriksen

Yellowknife City Councillor
- In office 2012–2018

Personal details
- Born: Yellowknife, Northwest Territories, Canada
- Party: Liberal
- Education: Southern Alberta Institute of Technology; University of Calgary

Rebecca Alty is a Canadian politician who has been Minister of Crown–Indigenous Relations since 2025. A member of the Liberal Party, Alty was elected to the House of Commons during the 2025 Canadian federal election and serves as the member of Parliament (MP) for Northwest Territories. Alty was the 15th mayor of Yellowknife from 2018 to 2025 and a city councillor for 2012 to 2018.

== Federal politics ==
On May 13, 2025, Alty became Minister of Crown–Indigenous Relations in Prime Minister Mark Carney's cabinet. Alty became the first federal minister from the Northwest Territories since 2006 and the first full cabinet minister with a portfolio ever to be from the Northwest Territories.

== Electoral record ==
2025 Canadian federal election: Northwest Territories
Party	Candidate	Votes	%	±%	Expenditures
Liberal	Rebecca Alty	8,855	53.51	+15.29	$48,814.53
Conservative	Kimberly Fairman	5,513	33.31	+18.90	$42,115.81
New Democratic	Kelvin Kotchilea	2,011	12.15	–20.19	$23,223.74
Green	Rainbow Eyes	170	1.03	–1.30	none listed
Total valid votes/expense limit		16,549	98.81	–	$130,570.22
Total rejected ballots		199	1.19	+0.10	
Turnout		16,748	54.92	+8.23	
Eligible voters		30,497			
Liberal hold		Swing		+17.10	
Source: Elections Canada

Order of precedence
Preceded by Shafqat Ali as Member of the Cabinet	Order of Precedence of Canada as Member of the Cabinet	Succeeded by Rebecca Chartrand as Member of the Cabinet
