= Pat McMahon (politician) =

Canadian politician (1945–2008)

Mayor of Yellowknife
- In office 1987–1994
- Preceded by: Michael McGrath
- Succeeded by: David Lovell

Personal details
- Born: Patricia Anne McMahon; February 2, 1945 Barrie, Ontario
- Died: July 9, 2008 (aged 63) Edmonton, Alberta

Patricia Anne McMahon (February 2, 1945 – July 9, 2008) was a Canadian politician from the Northwest Territories, who was the first female mayor of Yellowknife. She served as mayor of the city from 1987 to 1994, becoming most noted for her national prominence during the Giant Mine labour dispute.

== Career ==
She served on Yellowknife City Council prior to her election to the mayoralty, and was an unsuccessful candidate in a 1984 by-election to represent Yellowknife South in the Legislative Assembly of the Northwest Territories in 1984, losing to Ted Richard. She became mayor in 1987, making an early mark when she expressed concern about the potential environmental impacts of a proposed pulp mill on the Athabasca River. In this era she also threatened to sue the federal government over its refusal to pay municipal taxes on indigenous-owned properties in the city, and expressed her concerns about the potential impact on Yellowknife's economic development resulting from the creation of Nunavut.

She became a regular figure in Canadian news during the Giant Mine dispute, particularly after Roger Warren's 1992 bombing killed nine replacement workers.

Toward the end of her time in office, she also promoted Yellowknife as a major continental air transport hub, arguing that the city was well-positioned to provide a gateway for transcontinental flights. She has also been credited as a key force behind the creation of the city's Frame Lake Trail recreational nature facility.

She did not run for another term as mayor in 1994, and was succeeded by David Lovell.

In 1999 she ran again to represent Yellowknife South in the 1999 Northwest Territories general election, but lost by a margin of just 12 votes to Brendan Bell.

== Death ==
She died on July 9, 2008. Following her death, a memorial gathering was held on the Frame Lake Trail on July 24.

The Frame Lake Trail was also subsequently renamed the Pat McMahon Frame Lake Trail in her honour, and a scholarship was set up in her name to assist women from Yellowknife in pursuing postsecondary education in tourism, public administration or political science.
