= Yukon—Mackenzie River =

Former federal electoral district Canada

Yukon electoral district
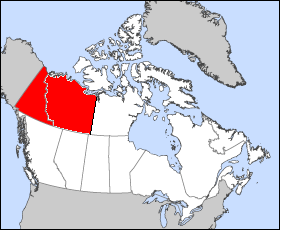

Defunct federal electoral district
- Legislature: House of Commons
- District created: 1949
- District abolished: 1952
- First contested: 1949
- Last contested: 1949

Yukon—Mackenzie River was a federal electoral district in Canada that was represented in the House of Commons of Canada from 1949 to 1953. It covered the Yukon Territory, and the southwestern part of the Northwest Territories. This riding was created in 1947, and was only used in the 1949 federal election. The Northwest Territories had not been represented in the House of Commons since 1905 following the creation of Alberta and Saskatchewan two years earlier. Yukon had been represented continuously since a byelection in January 1903.

It was abolished in 1952 when it was redistributed into Mackenzie River and Yukon ridings.

It consisted of the Yukon Territory and the part of the District of Mackenzie in the Northwest Territories lying west of the 109th meridian west longitude. The remainder of the District of Mackenzie, as well as the Districts of Keewatin, Franklin and Ungava, had no representation until 1962.

== Members of Parliament ==
Parliament	Years	Member	Party
Riding created from Yukon and unrepresented portions of the Northwest Territories
21st	1949–1953	James Aubrey Simmons	Liberal
Riding dissolved into Yukon and Mackenzie River

== Election results ==
1949 Canadian federal election
Party	Candidate	Votes	%
Liberal	James Aubrey Simmons	3,284	48.96
Independent	Arthur Massey Berry	2,283	34.04
Co-operative Commonwealth	James Elwyn Stephens	1,140	17.00
Total valid votes		6,707	100.0
This riding was created from Yukon and a portion of the previously-unrepresented Northwest Territories. Yukon had elected a Progressive Conservative candidate in the previous election.

== See also ==
- List of Canadian electoral districts
- Historical federal electoral districts of Canada
- Yukon (electoral district)
- Mackenzie River (electoral district)
- Northwest Territories (electoral district)
