= Dennis Bevington =

Canadian politician

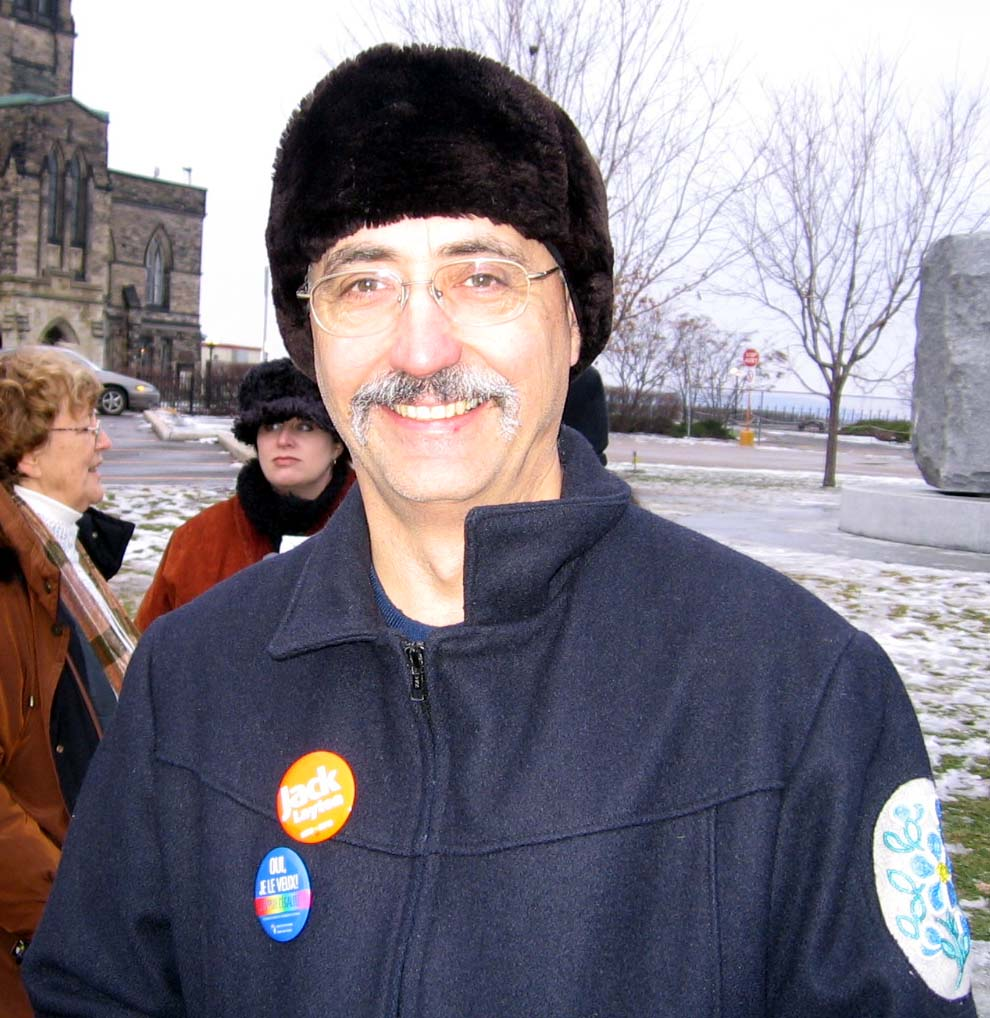
- Bevington in December 2006

Member of Parliament for Northwest Territories (Western Arctic; 2006–2014)
- In office January 23, 2006 – October 19, 2015
- Preceded by: Ethel Blondin-Andrew
- Succeeded by: Michael McLeod

Personal details
- Born: Dennis Fraser Bevington; March 27, 1953 (age 73) Fort Smith, Northwest Territories, Canada
- Party: New Democratic
- Spouse: Joan Bevington
- Profession: Administrator, businessman, manager

Dennis Fraser Bevington (born March 27, 1953) is a Canadian politician from the Northwest Territories, and was the member of Parliament for the riding of Northwest Territories from 2006 until 2015. Born in Fort Smith, he served as mayor from 1988 to 1997. During Bevington's term at the head of council, Fort Smith recognized the Chipewyan and Cree languages, making the town officially quadrilingual.

A businessman, Bevington has long been active on environmental issues. In the 2000 federal election he ran as the NDP candidate for Western Arctic, but lost by 18% to incumbent Ethel Blondin-Andrew. Bevington ran again in the 2004 election, losing to Blondin-Andrew by only 53 votes, one of the closest races of the election. Bevington succeeded in unseating Blondin-Andrew in the 2006 election, with a margin of 1,158 votes. On October 19, 2015, Bevington was defeated for re-election by Liberal candidate Michael McLeod.

Bevington fought for years to have the name of the riding changed from Western Arctic to Northwest Territories. Starting in 2008, Bevington tabled three private member's bills titled "An Act to change the name of the electoral district of Western Arctic", all dying on the order paper. The task was more difficult as the riding name had been specified directly in the Electoral Boundaries Readjustment Act, rather than in the representation orders governing other riding names. Bevington finally succeeded in having the name change incorporated into a bill that changed several other riding names in 2014.

== Electoral record ==
2015 Canadian federal election: Northwest Territories
Party	Candidate	Votes	%	±%	Expenditures
Liberal	Michael McLeod	9,172	48.34	+29.90	$71,207.71
New Democratic	Dennis Bevington	5,783	30.48	–15.36	$37,599.86
Conservative	Floyd Roland	3,481	18.35	–13.76	$75,298.47
Green	John Moore	537	2.83	–0.23	none listed
Total valid votes/expense limit		18,973	99.45	–	$214,028.20
Total rejected ballots		104	0.55	–	
Turnout		19,077	63.36	–	
Eligible voters		30,110			
Liberal gain from New Democratic		Swing		+22.63	
Source: Elections Canada

2011 Canadian federal election: Western Arctic
Party	Candidate	Votes	%	±%	Expenditures
New Democratic	Dennis Bevington	7,140	45.84	+4.39	$52,113.22
Conservative	Sandy Lee	5,001	32.11	–5.52	$89,189.32
Liberal	Joe Handley	2,872	18.44	+4.86	$64,438.99
Green	Eli Purchase	477	3.06	–2.44	$3,562.98
Animal Alliance	Bonnie Dawson	87	0.56	–	$1,214.76
Total valid votes/expense limit		15,577	99.50	–	$87,785.74
Total rejected ballots		78	0.50	+0.09	
Turnout		15,655	53.95	+6.24	
Eligible voters		29,020			
New Democratic hold		Swing		+4.96	
Source: Elections Canada

2008 Canadian federal election: Western Arctic
Party	Candidate	Votes	%	±%	Expenditures
New Democratic	Dennis Bevington	5,669	41.45	–0.71	$39,369.13
Conservative	Brendan Bell	5,146	37.63	+17.79	$84,014.56
Liberal	Gabrielle Mackenzie-Scott	1,858	13.58	–21.40	$37,149.36
Green	Sam Gamble	752	5.50	+3.40	$9,009.53
First Peoples National	Noeline Villebrun	252	1.84	–	$2,738.15
Total valid votes/expense limit		13,677	99.59	–	$84,911.89
Total rejected ballots		56	0.41	+0.08	
Turnout		13,733	47.71	–8.51	
Eligible voters		28,787			
New Democratic hold		Swing		–9.06	
Source: Elections Canada

2006 Canadian federal election: Western Arctic
Party	Candidate	Votes	%	±%	Expenditures
New Democratic	Dennis Bevington	6,802	42.16	+3.10	$40,702.82
Liberal	Ethel Blondin-Andrew	5,643	34.98	–4.47	$55,964.50
Conservative	Richard Edjericon	3,200	19.84	+2.67	$47,767.02
Green	Alexandre Beaudin	338	2.10	–2.23	$187.69
Independent	Jan H. Van der Veen	149	0.92	–	$17,661.32
Total valid votes/expense limit		16,132	99.67	–	$78,979.50
Total rejected ballots		54	0.33	–0.17	
Turnout		16,186	56.22	+8.89	
Eligible voters		28,792			
New Democratic gain from Liberal		Swing		+3.79	
Source: Elections Canada

2004 Canadian federal election: Western Arctic
Party	Candidate	Votes	%	±%	Expenditures
Liberal	Ethel Blondin-Andrew	5,317	39.45	–6.15	$57,738.20
New Democratic	Dennis Bevington	5,264	39.05	+12.34	$33,603.74
Conservative	Sean Mandeville	2,314	17.17	–10.52	$15,898.08
Green	Chris O'Brien	583	4.33	–	$2,754.92
Total valid votes/expense limit		13,478	99.50	–	$76,846.23
Total rejected ballots		68	0.50	–0.06	
Turnout		13,546	47.33	–4.91	
Eligible voters		28,619			
Liberal hold		Swing		–9.24	
Change for the Conservatives is based on the combined totals of the Canadian Alliance and the Progressive Conservatives.
Source: Elections Canada

2000 Canadian federal election: Western Arctic
Party	Candidate	Votes	%	±%	Expenditures
Liberal	Ethel Blondin-Andrew	5,855	45.60	+3.96	$56,498
New Democratic	Dennis Bevington	3,430	26.71	+7.41	$27,323
Alliance	Fred Turner	2,273	17.70	+2.99	$15,406
Progressive Conservative	Bruce McLaughlin	1,282	9.98	–2.64	$8,374
Total valid votes		12,840	99.44		
Total rejected ballots		72	0.56	–0.14	
Turnout		12,912	52.24	–6.13	
Eligible voters		24,716			
Liberal hold		Swing		−1.73	
Source: Elections Canada
