= Mackenzie River (electoral district) =

Former federal electoral district in the North-West Territories, Canada

Northwest Territories electoral district
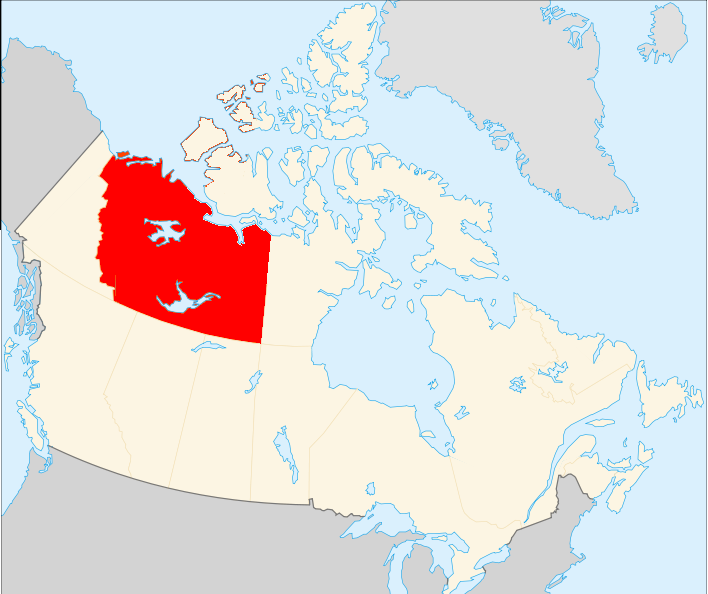

Defunct federal electoral district
- Legislature: House of Commons
- District created: 1952
- District abolished: 1962
- First contested: 1953
- Last contested: 1958

Mackenzie River was a federal electoral district in Northwest Territories, Canada, that was represented in the House of Commons of Canada from 1953 to 1962. This riding was created in 1952 when Yukon—Mackenzie River riding was split into two. The parts within the Northwest Territories became Mackenzie River riding. It was abolished in 1962 when it was merged into Northwest Territories riding.

It consisted the Provisional District of Mackenzie bounded on the west by the Yukon Territory; on the south by the parallel of the sixtieth degree of north latitude; on the east by the second meridian in the system of Dominion Land surveys, and on the north by the continental shore of the Arctic Ocean.

== Members of Parliament ==
Parliament	Years	Member	Party
Riding created from Yukon—Mackenzie River
22nd	1953–1957	Merv Hardie	Liberal
23rd	1957–1958	Merv Hardie	Liberal
24th	1958–1962	Merv Hardie	Liberal
Riding dissolved into Northwest Territories

== Election results ==
1958 Canadian federal election: Mackenzie River
Party	Candidate	Votes	%	±%
Liberal	Merv Hardie	2,782	57.22	-10.97
Progressive Conservative	John H. Winter	2,080	42.78	+10.97
Total valid votes		4,862	100.0	
Liberal hold		Swing		-10.97

1957 Canadian federal election: Mackenzie River
Party	Candidate	Votes	%	±%
Liberal	Merv Hardie	2,686	68.19	+18.81
Progressive Conservative	Harold E. Parkes	1,253	31.81	-6.73
Total valid votes		3,939	100.0	
Liberal hold		Swing		+12.77

1953 Canadian federal election: Mackenzie River
Party	Candidate	Votes	%
Liberal	Merv Hardie	1,722	49.38
Progressive Conservative	Albert Thomas Rivett	1,344	38.54
Independent	Kenneth Conibear	421	12.07
Total valid votes		3,487	100.0
This riding was created from parts of Yukon—Mackenzie River, where Liberal James Aubrey Simmons was the incumbent.

== See also ==
- List of Canadian electoral districts
- Historical federal electoral districts of Canada
