= Matt Berry, Edmonton =

Matt Berry
- Neighbourhood
- Location of Matt Berry in Edmonton
- Coordinates: 53.622°N 113.436°W
- Country: Canada
- Province: Alberta
- City: Edmonton
- Quadrant: NW
- Ward: Dene
- Sector: Northeast
- Area: Pilot Sound

Government
  - Administrative body: Edmonton City Council
  - Councillor: Aaron Paquette

Area
  - Total: 1.14 km^{2} (0.44 sq mi)
- Elevation: 696 m (2,283 ft)

Population (2012)
  - Total: 4,080
  - Density: 3,578.9/km^{2} (9,269/sq mi)
  - Change (2009–12): ▲5%
  - Dwellings: 1,299

Matt Berry is a residential neighbourhood in north east Edmonton, Alberta, Canada. It is named for aviator Arthur Massey ("Matt") Berry.

According to the 2001 federal census, substantially all residential development in Matt Berry occurred after 1985. Approximately one residence in six (15.6%) were built between 1986 and 1990. Eight in ten (82.2%) were built during the 1990s.

The most common type of residence in the neighbourhood, according to the 2005 municipal census, is the single-family dwelling. These account for 94% of all the residences in the neighbourhood. The remaining 6% are duplexes. Substantially all (98%) of the residences in the neighbourhood are owner-occupied.

The neighbourhood is bounded on the south by 153 Avenue, on the north by 167 Avenue, on the west by 66 Street, and on the east by 59A Street.

== Demographics ==
In the City of Edmonton's 2012 municipal census, Matt Berry had a population of 4,080 living in 1,299 dwellings, a 5% change from its 2009 population of 3,887. With a land area of 1.14 km^{2} (0.44 sq mi), it had a population density of 3,578.9 people/km^{2} in 2012.

== Schools ==
Edmonton Christian Northeast School (K-9)
