= Fred W. Henne =

Politician and businessman

His Worship Fred W. Henne

3rd Mayor of Yellowknife
- In office January 1, 1956 – December 31, 1957
- Preceded by: Gordon A. Allen
- Succeeded by: Ted Horton
- In office January 1, 1968 – December 31, 1973
- In office January 1, 1976 – December 31, 1979

Personal details
- Born: January 14, 1914
- Died: January 22, 1998 (aged 84) Summerland, British Columbia

Fred W. Henne (January 14, 1914 – January 22, 1998) was a labour leader, businessman and politician in the Northwest Territories, Canada.

Henne arrived in Yellowknife, NWT from British Columbia as a labour union negotiator in early 1947, and successfully negotiated the first collective bargaining agreement at the Con Mine and Giant Mine in Yellowknife. Soon thereafter, he decided to go into private business and purchased a controlling interest in the Frame & Perkins garage and automobile dealership in Yellowknife, which he operated from 1949 to 1980. Henne's political career began with various stints on the early Yellowknife Town Council, winning seats in the November 1947, November 1948, November 1950, November 1951 (appointed chairman of Trustee Council for 1952), and November 1953 elections. In January 1955, he was named deputy mayor under mayor Gordon A. Allen. In the November 1955 election, he ran a successful campaign as mayoral candidate against a single opponent. His term of office ran from January 1, 1956, to December 31, 1957. He was the first elected mayor of Yellowknife; the two municipal mayors previous were either acclaimed candidates or appointed.

He left Yellowknife to live in Grimshaw, Alberta in 1958 but later returned, running for the office of Yellowknife mayor again and winning by acclamation in the December 1967 election. Subsequently, Henne again became mayor in the December 1969 election, December 1971 election, losing in the December 1973 election, returning to victory in the December 1975 election, and the December 1977 election, his final term in office. During his terms of office in the 1960s and 1970s, mayor Fred Henne guided Yellowknife as it grew from a mining town to capital of the Northwest Territories.

Fred Henne left Yellowknife in 1980, and died in 1998 in Summerland, BC. Fred Henne Territorial Park is named in his memory.
