= Sheryl Yakeleya =

Canadian politician

Sheryl Yakeleya MLA

Member of the Legislative Assembly of the Northwest Territories for Deh Cho
- Incumbent
- Assumed office November 14, 2023
- Preceded by: Ronald Bonnetrouge

Personal details
- Party: non-partisan consensus government

Sheryl Yakeleya is a Canadian politician, who was elected to the Legislative Assembly of the Northwest Territories in the 2023 election. She represents the electoral district of Deh Cho.

== Election results ==
2023 Northwest Territories general election: Deh Cho
Candidate	Votes	%
Sheryl Yakeleya	229	39.48
Steven Vandell	178	30.69
Ronald Bonnetrouge (I)	146	25.17
Richard C. Lafferty	27	4.66
Total votes	580	
