= James Aubrey Simmons =

Canadian politician

James Simmons

Member of Parliament for Yukon (Yukon—Mackenzie River; 1949–1953)
- In office June 27, 1949 – June 10, 1957
- Preceded by: George Black
- Succeeded by: Erik Nielsen

Personal details
- Born: James Aubrey Simmons; July 8, 1897 Revelstoke, British Columbia, Canada
- Died: November 30, 1979 (aged 82) West Vancouver, British Columbia, Canada
- Party: Liberal
- Spouse: Della Louise Rapuzzi (m. 1934)
- Profession: Notary

James Aubrey Simmons (July 8, 1897 – November 30, 1979) was a Canadian politician, notary and magistrate.

Born in Revelstoke, British Columbia, Simmons would go on to sit many times in the House of Commons of Canada representing the Yukon Territory.

A member of the Liberal Party, his first win came in 1949 when he represented the federal constituency of Yukon-Mackenzie River, an electoral district newly crafted out of the Yukon electoral district in 1947. Simmons easily won the election. His rival, Arthur Massey Berry, an independent, lost by over 1,000 votes.

By 1953, at the next federal election, the riding of Yukon-Mackenzie River was abolished and transformed again into the Yukon electoral district. Running again for a seat in the House, Simmons won the 1953 election for the Yukon. In parliament, Simmons sponsored a bill for the creation of an Alaska-Yukon pipeline.

He was re-elected in 1957 federal election, but his election was declared void and he lost the subsequent by-election. He tried in the 1958 federal election to regain his seat but was again defeated and he never again went for a seat in the House of Commons.

He died in 1979 following a stroke.

== Electoral record ==
1949 Canadian federal election: Yukon—Mackenzie River
Party	Candidate	Votes	%
Liberal	James Aubrey Simmons	3,284	48.96
Independent	Arthur Massey Berry	2,283	34.04
Co-operative Commonwealth	James Elwyn Stephens	1,140	17.00
Total valid votes		6,707	100.00
Total rejected ballots		unknown	
Turnout		6,707	–
Eligible voters			
This riding was created from Yukon and a portion of the previously-unrepresented Northwest Territories. Yukon had elected a Progressive Conservative candidate in the previous election.
Source: Library of Parliament

Parliament of Canada
Preceded by George Black	Member of Parliament for Yukon—Mackenzie River; 1949 – 1953	Succeeded by Erik Nielsen
Preceded by George Black	Member of Parliament for Yukon; 1953 – 1957	Succeeded by Erik Nielsen
